= Shmuel Yitzchak Hillman =

Lithuanian-British Talmudic scholar and rabbi

Rabbi Shmuel Yitzchak Hillman
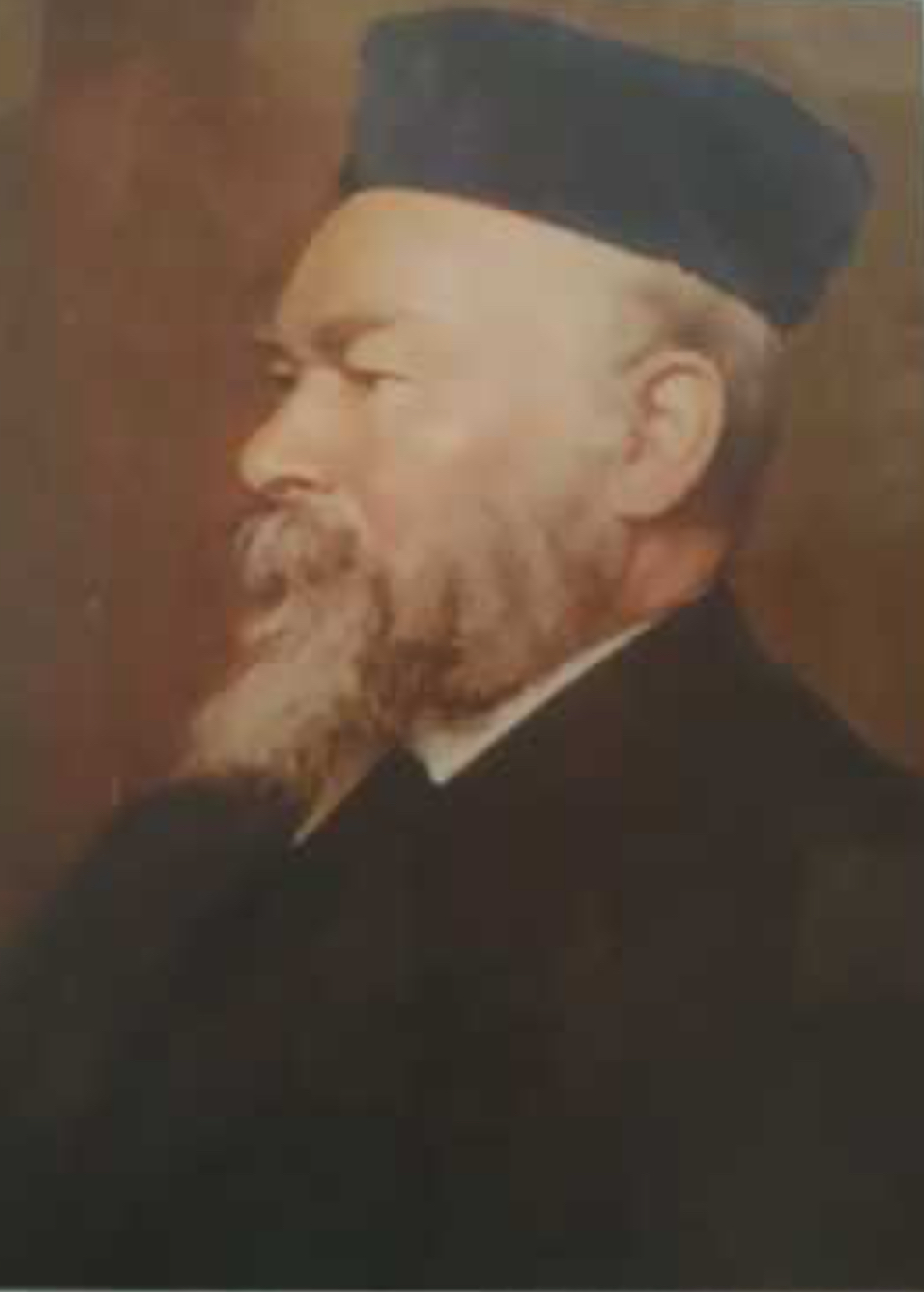
- Rabbi Shmuel Yitzchak Hillman

Dayan of the London Beth Din
- In office 1914–1934

Rabbi and head of the Beth Din of Berazino
- In office 1897–1908

Rabbi in Glasgow
- In office 1908–1914

Personal life
- Born: July 2, 1868 Kovno, Lithuania
- Died: June 1, 1953 (aged 84) Jerusalem, Israel
- Notable work: Or Hayashar
- Education: Volozhin Yeshiva
- Occupation: Rabbi, Talmudic scholar

Religious life
- Religion: Judaism
- Denomination: Orthodox

Rabbi Shmuel Yitzchak Hillman (2 July 1868 – 1 June 1953) was a renowned Orthodox Jewish Talmudic scholar, posek and rabbi and served as a dayan of the London Beth Din.

== Life and work ==
Shmuel Yitzchak (English: Samuel Isaac) Hillman was born in Kovno, Lithuania, the son of Paya Rivka and Avraham Chaim Hillman. In his youth, he studied Torah under his uncles, Rabbi Mordechai Hillman, av beth din of Pasvatin, and Rabbi Noach Yaakov Hillman of Pasval. After his marriage, he studied intensively by himself in the house of his father-in-law, Rabbi Yitzchak Hirsch in the town of Franks in Kurland.

Rabbi Hillman received semicha from the famous Rabbis Eliyahu Dovid Teomim (who was the chief rabbi in Ponevezh and afterwards served in Jerusalem), Refael Shapiro of Volozhin, Meir Simcha HaKohen of Dvinsk and the Ridvaz of Slutsk.

Rabbi Hillman's son David Hillman was born in Lithuania in 1893. David Hillman had three sons Ellis Hillman, Harold Hillman and Mayer Hillman. Rabbi Hillman also had a daughter Sarah who married Isaac Herzog (the first Ashkenazi Chief Rabbi of the State of Israel); their son Chaim Herzog was President of Israel from 1983 to 1993, and their son Yaacov Herzog was Ben Gurion’s and Golda Meir’s Chef de Cabinet.

In 1897, when Rabbi Hillman was 29 years old, he became rabbi and head of the Beth Din of Berazino in the Minsk Region of then-Russia, an old and distinguished community that had been graced with many great rabbis in the past. In 1908, he was appointed rabbi in Glasgow, serving and founding the Beth Din there until 1914, when he was appointed a dayan of the London Beth Din.

After retiring from the London Beth Din in 1934, Dayan Hillman settled in Jerusalem, devoting himself to study and writing. He co-founded the Jerusalem yeshiva Ohel Torah together with his son-in-law Chief Rabbi of Israel Yitzhak HaLevi Herzog, and served as its rosh yeshiva.

His grandson Chaim Herzog, and great-grandson Isaac Herzog both served as Presidents of the State of Israel.

== Lineage ==
Rabbi Hillman was a descendant of his namesake Rabbi Shmuel Hillman (Helman), the Av Beth Din of Metz, who is mentioned in the introduction to the responsa Noda Bihudah. On his mother's side, he was a descendant of Rabbi Michal Datnover, who was known in his time as an exceptional scholar and Kabbalist. His mother, Faya Hillman, moved to Hebron after the death of her husband. She survived the 1929 Hebron massacre by laying still amid the bodies of victims. A photograph of her laying wounded in a hospital bed appears in the book TARPAT Hebron with the caption "Faya Hillman, mother of the rabbi from London." Both she and her son were mentioned by descendant President Isaac Herzog during a Hanukkah candle lighting ceremony.

In addition, Rabbi Hillman was a direct sixth-generation descendant of the author of Knesses Yechezkel, who was the Av Beth Din of Altona, Hamburg and Wandsbek. He also descended from the Katzenellenbogen family, and could trace his lineage back to the Maharam (Rabbi Meir ben Isaac) of Padua and Rabbi Yehuda Mintz.

== Death ==
Rabbi Hillman died in Jerusalem in 1953. Thousands of people followed his funeral through the streets of Jerusalem, among them Cabinet ministers, Members of the Knesset, and leading rabbis and rosh yeshivas. Dayan Hillman's death caused deep sorrow in Jerusalem, where he was greatly beloved.

Eulogies were delivered by the deceased's son-in-law Chief Rabbi Herzog, Rabbi Isser Zalman Meltzer (with whom Dayan Hillman learned with in the Volozhin yeshiva), the Minister of Religious Affairs Mr Moshe Shapira, and others. He was survived by his wife; his daughter Sarah, the wife of Rabbi Yitzhak HaLevi Herzog; and his son David Hillman, a London artist.

Soon after Dayan Hillman died, a memorial service was held in London, where Chief Rabbi Israel Brodie and Dayan Yehezkel Abramsky spoke, full of praise, respect and admiration for the deceased. Dayan Lazarus, Dayan Grunfeld, Dayan Grossnass and Rabbi Isidore Epstein were among those in attendance.

== Works ==
Dayan Hillman authored many scholarly works, including a 20-volume commentary on every tractate of the Babylonian and Jerusalem Talmuds, as well as on the Mishnaic Orders Zeraim and Taharos and on the Rambam and Sifra, entitled Or Hayashar (London, Jerusalem). He also published novellae on the Tanakh and a book of his sermons and orations.

Among the other writings of this outstanding figure were manuscripts on the Talmudic tractates Zevachim, Arakhin and Temura—all in the Order of Kodshim—and responsa on all four sections of the Shulchan Aruch.

== Sources ==
- Jewish Chronicle archives
- Otzar HaPerushim (page 14)
