= Hackney Central (disambiguation) =

Hackney Central is a neighbourhood in London, England.

Hackney Central could also refer to:

- Hackney Central railway station
- Hackney Central (UK Parliament constituency)
- Hackney Central (electoral division), Greater London Council
- Hackney Central (London County Council constituency)
