= David Hillman =

David Hillman may refer to:

- David Hillman (tenor)
- David Hillman (politician)
- David Hillman (artist)

== See also ==
- Dave Hillman, American baseball player
