= Benjamin Goldschmidt =

Benjamin Goldschmidt may refer to:

- Carl Wolfgang Benjamin Goldschmidt, German astronomer
- Benjamin Goldschmidt, founding rabbi of Altneu
