= Cruel and unusual punishment =

Punishment deemed overly severe

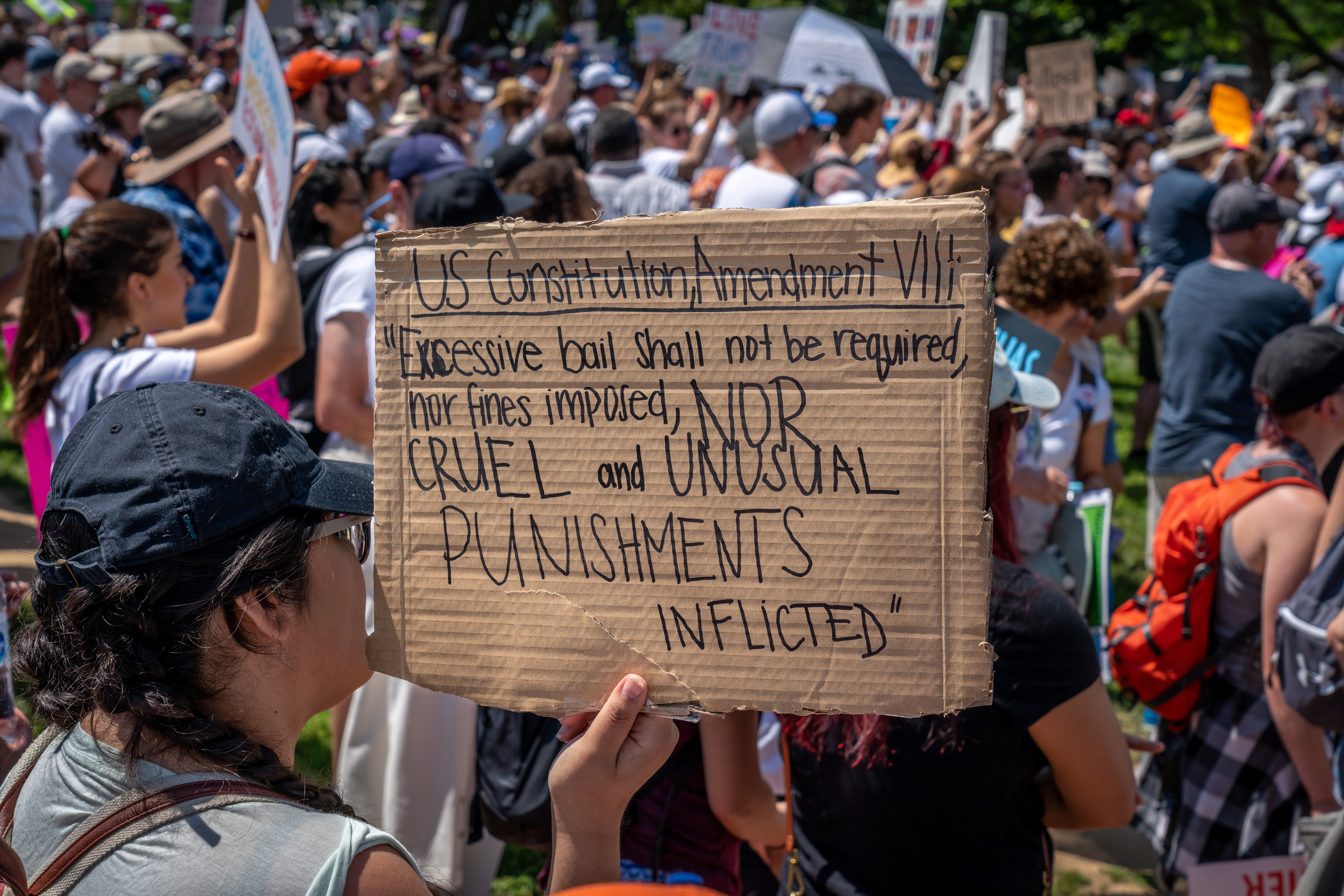
A woman holds up a cardboard sign stating the Eighth Amendment

"Cruel and unusual punishment" is a phrase in common law describing punishment that is considered unacceptable due to the suffering, pain, or humiliation it inflicts on the person subjected to the sanction. The precise definition varies by jurisdiction, but typically includes punishments that are arbitrary, unnecessary, or overly severe compared to the crime.

== History ==
The words "cruel and unusual punishment" (the actual words were firstly "illegal and cruel Punishments" and secondly "cruel and unusual Punishments") were first used in the 1689 English Bill of Rights. They were later also adopted in the United States by the Sixth Amendment to the United States Constitution (ratified 1791) and in the British Leeward Islands (1798). Very similar words, "No one shall be subjected to torture or to cruel, inhuman or degrading treatment or punishment", appear in Article 5 of the Universal Declaration of Human Rights adopted by the United Nations General Assembly on December 10, 1948. The right under a different formulation is also found in Article 3 of the European Convention on Human Rights (1950) and in Article 7 of the International Covenant on Civil and Political Rights (1966). The Canadian Charter of Rights and Freedoms (1982) also contains this fundamental right in section 12 and it is to be found in Article 4 (quoting the European Convention verbatim) of the Charter of Fundamental Rights of the European Union (2000). It is also found in Article 16 of the Convention against Torture and other Cruel, Inhuman or Degrading Treatment or Punishment (1984), and in Article 40 of the Constitution of Poland (1997). The Constitution of the Marshall Islands, in the sixth section of its Bill of Rights (Article 2), prohibits "cruel and unusual punishment", which it defines as: the death penalty; torture; "inhuman and degrading treatment"; and "excessive fines or deprivations".

=== United States ===
The Eighth Amendment to the United States Constitution states that "cruel and unusual punishments [shall not be] inflicted." The general principles that the United States Supreme Court relied on to decide whether or not a particular punishment was cruel and unusual were determined by Justice William Brennan. In Furman v. Georgia, 408 U.S. 238 (1972), Justice Brennan concurring wrote, "There are, then, four principles by which we may determine whether a particular punishment is 'cruel and unusual'."

- The "essential predicate" is "that a punishment must not by its severity be degrading to human dignity", especially torture.
- "A severe punishment that is obviously inflicted in wholly arbitrary fashion." (Furman v. Georgia temporarily suspended capital punishment for this reason.)
- "A severe punishment that is clearly and totally rejected throughout society."
- "A severe punishment that is patently unnecessary."

And he added: "The function of these principles, after all, is simply to provide [the] means by which a court can determine whether [the] challenged punishment comports with human dignity. They are, therefore, interrelated, and, in most cases, it will be their convergence that will justify the conclusion that a punishment is 'cruel and unusual.' The test, then, will ordinarily be a cumulative one: if a punishment is unusually severe, if there is a strong probability that it is inflicted arbitrarily, if it is substantially rejected by contemporary society, and if there is no reason to believe that it serves any penal purpose more effectively than some less severe punishment, then the continued infliction of that punishment violates the command of the Clause that the State may not inflict inhuman and uncivilized punishments upon those convicted of crimes."

Continuing, he wrote that he expected that no state would pass a law obviously violating any one of these principles, so court decisions regarding the Eighth Amendment would involve a "cumulative" analysis of the implication of each of the four principles. In this way, the United States Supreme Court "set the standard that a punishment would be cruel and unusual [if] it was too severe for the crime, [if] it was arbitrary, if it offended society's sense of justice, or if it was not more effective than a less severe penalty."

== Capital punishment ==
There is much discussion as to whether capital punishment is considered cruel and unusual. Common arguments are that capital punishment is more expensive when factoring in appeals versus life in prison, and that the government has been wrong before on death penalty cases (therefore, the government could be wrong again, and the government ought not have the authority to end a life). These two arguments alone may or may not qualify under the tests the government puts forth, which could also be considered arbitrary itself, especially if society is not informed enough on these considerable facts. For most of recorded history, capital punishments were often deliberately cruel, painful, and/or degrading. Severe historical execution methods include the breaking wheel, hanging, drawing, and quartering, mazzatello, death by boiling, death by burning, execution by drowning, immurement, crucifixion, impalement, execution by elephant, stoning, sawing, and slow slicing.

In 2008, Michael Portillo on the show Horizon argued that in ensuring an execution is not of a cruel and unusual nature, the following criteria must be met:

- Death should be quick and painless to prevent suffering for the person being executed;
- Medical education should be provided to the executioner to prevent suffering caused by error;
- The death should not be gory (to prevent suffering for those carrying out the execution); and
- No co-operation should be required from the person being executed, to prevent inaction, distress, and/or suffering caused by the prisoner being required to participate in their own execution.

It was found that no present-used method could fulfil these criteria and the unethical nature of capital punishment invalidates these principles, but that hypoxia, i.e. through inert gas asphyxiation (a method then not in use) held the most promise. Furthermore, a study conducted by Harold Hillman in 1993 on "possible pain experienced during execution by different methods" reached the conclusion that "[a]ll of the methods used for executing people [including shooting, hanging, decapitation, electrocution, and gas inhalation], with the possible exception of lethal injection, are likely to cause pain".

== See also ==
- Geneva Conventions
- Prisoner abuse
- Psychological torture
- Retributive justice
- Security of person
- War crime
