= United Synagogue =

Union of British Orthodox Jewish synagogues

- Abbreviation: The US
- Formation: 1870
- Founder: Nathan Marcus Adler
- Registration no.: 242552
- Headquarters: 305 Ballards Lane, North Finchley, London, N12 8GB
- Members: 56 synagogues; 36,000+ members
- Key people: Michael Goldstein (President); Jo Grose (Chief Executive)
- Revenue: £44,440,000
- Expenses: £45,939,000
- Staff: 782
- Volunteers: 2,000+
- Website: www.theus.org.uk

The United Synagogue (US) is the largest umbrella body for Orthodox Judaism in Britain. It is structured as a charity with the objective to serve the British Jewish community in the broadest possible way.One of the largest charities in the British Jewish community, it provides much of the infrastructure for the British Jewish community and supports 56 centrist Orthodox Jewish member synagogues. With more than 36,000 members, it is also the largest synagogue body in Europe. The work of the charity includes KLBD, its kashrut (kosher food) department, nurseries, marriages, the United Synagogue Burial Society, Tribe programmes and summer camps for young people, its Chesed team supporting vulnerable people and the highly-respected London Beth Din. The charity also supports the work of the Office of the Chief Rabbi. The spiritual head of the United Synagogue is Chief Rabbi Sir Ephraim Mirvis KBE, the Chief Rabbi of the United Hebrew Congregations of the Commonwealth—a title that bears some formal recognition by the Crown.

== History ==
The United Synagogue was mandated by an Act of Parliament in 1870, granting formal recognition to a union of five London communities:

- Great Synagogue
- Hambro' Synagogue
- New Synagogue
- Central Synagogue (a branch of the Great Synagogue)
- Bayswater Synagogue (a joint branch of the Great Synagigue and the New Synagogue

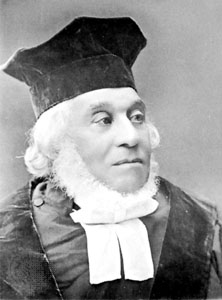
Nathan Marcus Adler, Chief Rabbi and founder of the United Synagogue

This confederation was forged by Nathan Marcus Adler, who bore the title of Chief Rabbi of the British Empire. Leaders of the organisation included Nathan Rothschild, 1st Baron Rothschild, who served as president in 1910.

At the time of its inception, the United Synagogue and its large constituent synagogues was the dominant force in Jewish communal and religious organisation. However, starting in the 1880s, immigrating Eastern European Jews tended to form and to pray in small synagogues rather than large ones with English formalities.

In 1887, Jewish community leader Samuel Montagu created the Federation of Synagogues, which worked to unite Orthodox synagogues of Russian and other eastern European Jewish immigrants, many of whom lived in the slums of East London. Although the United Synagogue didn't build smaller synagogues which the new immigrant population might have preferred, the organisation was actively engaged from its inception in working out how to accommodate, integrate and support their fellow Jews from abroad, as evidenced by the charitable objectives registered with the Charity Commission. For example, the East London Synagogue, the first synagogue built by the newly-formed United Synagogue in 1877, was constructed to cater to Jews who had immigrated from Eastern Europe and looked after them for decades.

Today, the Federation serves 18 synagogues, and the United Synagogue, 56. There are other Orthodox synagogues unaffiliated with the United Synagogue in Britain, including Haredi, Chabad, and other shuls. In addition, there are congregations of Reform, Masorti, and Liberal Jews that are not included in the United Synagogue. Thus, today, the charity represents around a third of all British Jewish congregants. Since 1990, centrist Orthodoxy has declined from 66% to 55% of religious Jews, but this decline has flattened out recently.

In 1970, the United Synagogue celebrated its centenary. Events included a special service held at the St. Johns Wood Synagogue, an exhibition of Jewish artifacts held at the Christies Auction Rooms, and a celebratory banquet held at the Dorchester Hotel in the presence of the Queen and the Duke of Edinburgh. This was the first time that the Queen had attended an event held by the Anglo-Jewish community; the Duke of Edinburgh had previously attended the tercentenary commemoration of the return of Jews to England during the rule of Oliver Cromwell.

In 2020, the United Synagogue celebrated its 150th anniversary. More than 200 people returned to where the organisation was created in 1870 by an Act of Parliament with a reception in Westminster where a copy of the 1870 Act was on display. The subsequent COVID-19 pandemic curtailed many of the events planned for mark the celebration. The Queen wrote to the President of the United Synagogue, Michael Goldstein, sending "her best wishes to all concerned for a most successful and enjoyable year celebrating the significant milestone in the history of the United Synagogue." The pandemic forced the charity to invest in digital programming including the creation of TheUS.tv, an online video platform, and content to celebrate the 150th anniversary. A postponed celebration at Guildhall was held in December 2021.

Over time, the United Synagogue has closed synagogues in areas of Jewish decline, including many grand cathedral-type synagogues, such as Bayswater (to make way for the Westway road), New Cross, Brixton (one of the very few large United Synagogues south of the Thames), the Great Synagogue, East London, Hammersmith, Cricklewood, Egerton Road (the New), Lofting Road, and Dalston. The charity has reinvested these funds in new synagogues in areas of Jewish growth, especially in Hertfordshire and the north-western suburbs of London, such as Borehamwood, Edgware and Barnet and in recent years has embarked on a number of ambitious projects redeveloping new community centres at South Hampstead and Highgate. New communities have been seeded in Hatfield and Mill Hill East.

Much of the previous formality of the United Synagogue, such as the wearing of clerical canonicals by its clergy and waistcoats and top hats by its wardens, has disappeared. The synagogues use modern Hebrew vernacular for prayers. The Finchley (Kinloss) synagogue, one of the largest of the existing communities, holds an annual religious service to commemorate Yom Hazikaron, Israel's Remembrance Day for its fallen soldiers and victims of terror and the Independence Day of the State of Israel, attended by the Chief Rabbi, the Israeli ambassador to the United Kingdom, and a senior member of His Majesty's government.

== Activities ==
The United Synagogue powers Jewish life through the critical infrastructure and programmes which the charity provides for the British Jewish community.

The work of the charity includes KLBD, its kashrut (kosher food) and eruv (Shabbat boundaries) team, nurseries, marriages, the United Synagogue Burial Society, the Centre for Rabbinic Excellence, educational resources, Tribe programmes and summer camps for young people, Heritage, the US Chesed team supporting people in need, Accessibility and Inclusion and the highly-respected London Beth Din. The charity also supports the work of the Office of the Chief Rabbi.

The United Synagogue serves its members and the wider community by acting as the foundation body for 11 Jewish schools in Greater London.

Activities are financed mostly from charitable donations, membership subscriptions and the charity's activities.

The charity's accounts state that more than 2,000 volunteers are involved in the charity's work, leading synagogues, running adult and children's programming and supporting vulnerable Jewish families and people in need of all backgrounds. United Synagogue members volunteer for the chevra kadisha (Burial Society), preparing the bodies of members of the charity for burial.

=== Great Israeli Real Estate Event ===
In June 2026, the Edgware United Synagogue hosted a stop on the Great Israeli Real Estate Event, a property roadshow that had marketed properties for sale in Israel and illegal Israeli settlements in the West Bank. Despite event organizers claiming that the event would not promote the sale of properties in the West Bank, protesters against the event assembled outside the synagogue. The government referred the incident to the Advertising Standards Authority, requesting that it ensure UK law and regulations are upheld. In a statement the U.K. government said "We completely oppose the advertisement of properties for sale in settlements, which are illegal under international law."

Amnesty International UK condemned the event and said that it "profits from war crimes and apartheid".

London's Metropolitan Police said that it had received a referral related to the event but was not investigating it.

In August 2026 the Charity Commission criticised trustees of the Edgware United Synagogue in London for hosting the event, and reopened a previously closed compliance case. It said: "We share concerns about the potential impact, including on public trust and confidence, of registered charities being seen to actively assist in the development or expansion of illegal settlements in Palestine. We are also clear that charity premises must not be misused."

=== Maintenance of cemeteries ===
The United Synagogue also looks after more than a dozen cemeteries throughout England. Some of these in the East End of London and West Ham have closed and are no longer in use but the charity has the responsibility to maintain them in perpetuity. Willesden Jewish Cemetery was consecrated in 1873 and includes the graves of many famous historical figures. Some funerals are still held there today. The main cemeteries in use are in Waltham Abbey and Bushey. Bushey New Cemetery was consecrated in 2017 and was the runner-up of the Stirling Prize for architecture in 2018, the first time a cemetery of any kind has been a candidate for this award. The remains of six unknown Holocaust victims were laid to rest in Bushey New Cemetery on January 23, 2019 in a ceremony attended by more than 1,000 people. A memorial and garden was subsequently built around the grave.

== Synagogues ==
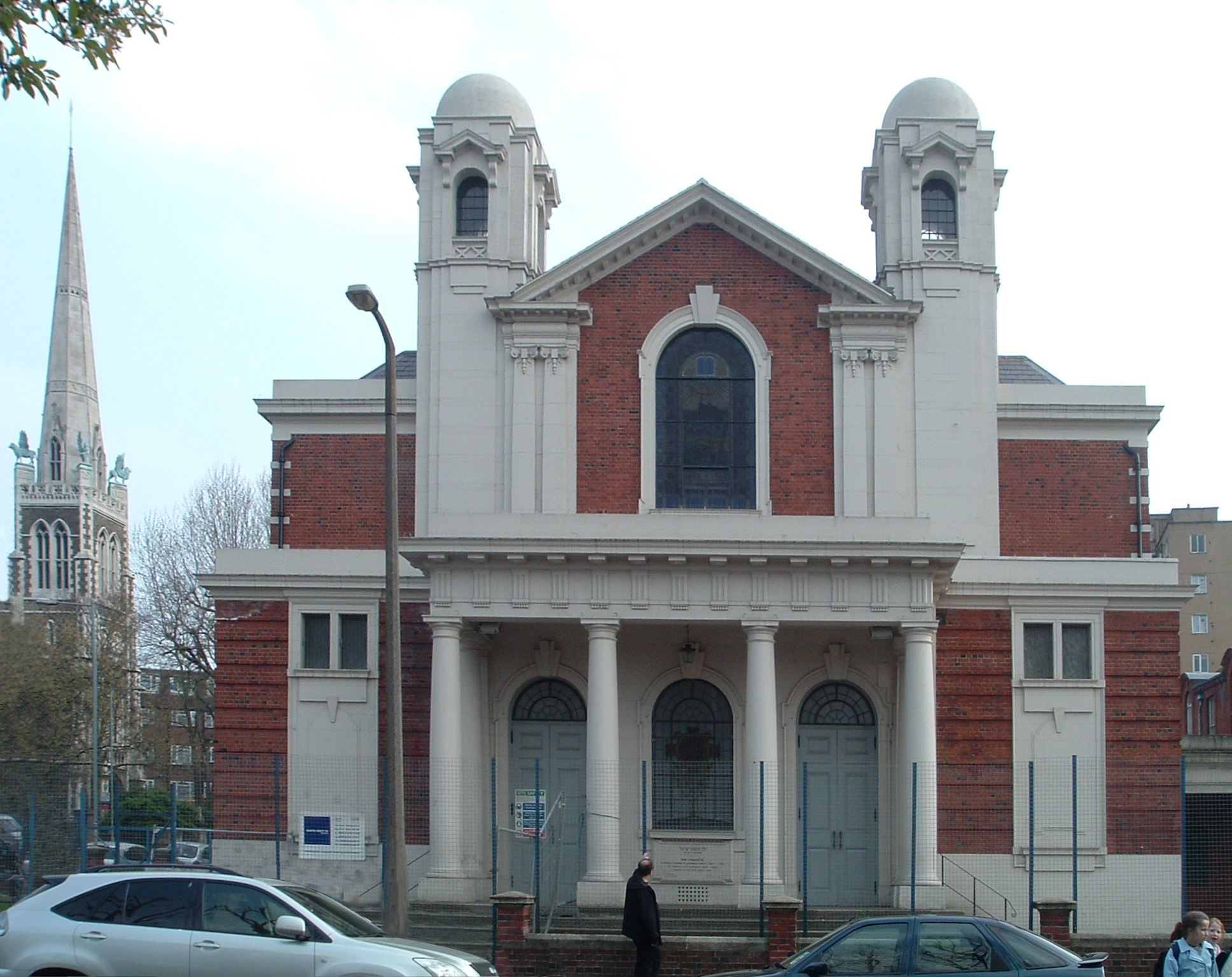
Egerton Road synagogue

Seven of the present United Synagogue buildings feature the stained glass windows of the twentieth-century artist David Hillman; the most extensive collection, with over 100 windows, is at the St. Johns Wood Synagogue. Some of the closed synagogues, such as Lofting Road or Dalston, were demolished and replaced by other buildings. Some were converted to different religious denominations, with Hammersmith now functioning as a church. In one case, the synagogue on Egerton Road was bought by a local Haredi group (Bobov) and still maintains a strong Jewish presence.

=== Kingfield Synagogue ===
Kingfield Synagogue, or officially United Synagogue Sheffield, is a United synagogue located in Sheffield. It was founded in 1953. The Rabbi is Yonosan Golomb. Kingfield is one of two Jewish congregations in Sheffield, the other being Seven Hills Shul.

== Jewish community ==
The United Synagogue is one of 29 members of the Jewish Leadership Council, a British umbrella organisation. It also elects deputies to the Board of Deputies of British Jews.

== See also ==
- List of chief rabbis of the United Kingdom
- History of the Jews in England
