= Steve Bundred =

English politician

Chief Executive of the Audit Commission
- In office 2003–2010
- Preceded by: Andrew Foster
- Succeeded by: Eugene Sullivan

Chief Executive of Camden Council
- In office 1995–2003
- Preceded by: Jeremy Smith
- Succeeded by: Moira Gibb

Member of the Greater London Council for Islington North
- In office 1981–1986
- Preceded by: Louis Bondy
- Succeeded by: GLC was abolished

Personal details
- Party: Labour
- Spouse: Kathleen Bundred

Stephen Bundred (born 1952) is a retired Labour Party politician and public administrator in London, England. He is unusual in having had a career in party politics before holding high-ranking apolitical public offices, including as Chief Executive of Camden London Borough Council (1995–2003), Chief of Executive of the Audit Commission (2003–2010) and Chair of Monitor (2010–2014).

He was a researcher for the National Union of Mineworkers. He was elected as a Labour councillor on Islington London Borough Council in a by-election in 1977 and served for one year (although his wife Kathleen was later an Islington councillor). He then stood for Labour for election to the European Parliament in 1979 for London South East, but lost to the Tory candidate. Bundred served on the Greater London Council from 1981 until its abolition in 1986, representing Islington North. Upon the GLC's abolition, he was elected to represent Islington North on the Inner London Education Authority. On the GLC, he was known as being part of the left and allied to Ken Livingstone.

He entered local government administration as director of finance at the London Borough of Hackney, Birkbeck College, and then the London Borough of Camden. He became Chief Executive of Camden Council in 1995. At Camden, he was involved in a high-profile sexual discrimination case. However, he was described by the Times as "turning round Camden Council".

He was appointed as Chief Executive of the Audit Commission in 2003. His appointment was criticised because of his political background. In 2009, he called for public sector pay cuts. In 2010, he called Tory plans to ring-fence NHS and schools funding "insane". He left the role in 2010 and became chair of NHS regulator Monitor.
