= Hackney North and Stoke Newington (disambiguation) =

Hackney North and Stoke Newington is a parliamentary constituency in Greater London.

Hackney North and Stoke Newington may also refer to:

- Hackney North and Stoke Newington (electoral division), Greater London Council
- Stoke Newington and Hackney North (London County Council constituency)
