= Islington North (disambiguation) =

Islington North could refer to:

- Islington North (UK Parliament constituency)
- Islington North (electoral division), Greater London Council
- Islington North (London County Council constituency)
