= Harold Hillman =

British neurobiologist

Harold Hillman (16 August 1930 – 5 August 2016) was a British scientist and expert in the neurobiology of execution methods. He was born in London.

== Theories ==
Hillman caused controversy in biological fields with his insistence that structures seen in cells under the electron microscope were little more than artefacts. He maintained that up to 90 percent of the brain is made up of "a fine, granular material that is virtually liquid," and that the brain only has two cell types, instead of four.

Mainstream scientists maintain that as fixation techniques have been compared with other analysis techniques, there is no explanation for why all the different techniques should produce identical artifacts.

Hillman's main field was neurobiology and resuscitation, in which his work was largely uncontroversial.

== Charitable work ==
Hillman was a founder member of Amnesty International, and later produced research for the charity.

== Career ==
Hillman was Reader in Physiology at the University of Surrey from 1965 until 1989, when he took early retirement after being threatened with loss of tenure. He wrote in 1996: "I believe that I am the only tenured academic in Britain who has lost his tenure because of his or her scientific views."

In 1997, he was awarded the Ig Nobel Peace Prize for his report "The Possible Pain Experienced During Execution by Different Methods."

Harold Hillman died peacefully of heart failure on 5 August 2016. He was survived by his wife, their children, and their grandchildren.

== Personal life ==
Hillman was born to David Hillman (artist), a well known producer of stained glass, who was the son of Rabbi Shmuel Yitzchak Hillman. His brothers were Ellis Hillman and Mayer Hillman, and he was a cousin of Chaim Herzog, the sixth President of Israel and father of Issac Herzog, the current president of Israel.

== Publications ==
- "What price intellectual honesty?” asks a neurobiologist, published in Brian Martin (editor), Confronting the Experts (Albany, NY: State University of New York Press, 1996), ISBN 9780791429143, pp. 99–130 (includes a bibliography of his works to 1996)
- Hillman, Harold (1986). The Cellular Structure of the Mammalian Nervous System: A re-examination, and some consequences for neurobiology. Springer Science & Business Media. ISBN 978-94-009-4922-5.

== See also ==
- List of Ig Nobel Prize winners
