= Altneu =

Synagogue in New York City

The Altneu

Religion
- Affiliation: Modern Orthodox Judaism
- Ecclesiastical or organisational status: Synagogue
- Leadership: Rabbi Benjamin Goldschmidt
- Status: Active

Location
- Location: Upper East Side, Manhattan, New York City, New York
- Country: United States

Architecture
- Established: 2022 (as a congregation)
- Construction cost: $34.5 million (purchase cost)

The Altneu is a Modern Orthodox synagogue located on the Upper East Side of Manhattan in New York City, New York, United States. The synagogue informally formed in late 2021 after the departure of Rabbi Benjamin Goldschmidt from the Park East Synagogue, and officially launched in early 2022.

== History ==
Park East Synagogue, a 133-year-old Modern Orthodox synagogue on the Upper East Side of New York City, had been led by Senior Rabbi Arthur Schneier for over 50 years. In a letter sent to synagogue membership on October 4, 2021, a group of congregants expressed concern with the synagogue's trajectory and announced a committee to revitalize the synagogue, along with Assistant Rabbi Benjamin Goldschmidt, the son of Rabbi Pinchas Goldschmidt. Less than two weeks later, Goldschmidt was fired by Park East on October 15.

By late October, Goldschmidt began hosting his own Shabbat services at locations on the Upper East Side, with at least 80 people attending.

Goldschmidt and his wife Avital Chizhik-Goldschmidt announced the Altneu, a portmanteau of the Yiddish words for "old" and "new" on February 15, 2022.

In the synagogue's early days, they rented venues throughout the East Side of Manhattan, such as the Asia Society, Pierre Hotel, Explorers Club, and the Harold Pratt House. In April 2024, the synagogue announced that it had purchased the Thomas Lamont mansion for $34.5 million.

== Activities ==
One of the synagogue's first initiatives was supporting Ukrainian refugees. Synagogue members raised over $35,000 and the synagogue donated $15,000 to pay for the wedding ceremony of Ukrainian Jewish refugees in Israel.

After the October 7 attack in 2023, the synagogue launched a Jewish matchmaking initiative to emphasize Jewish identity and continuity.
