= Ina Chaplin =

Personal details
- Born: Irene Marcousé; 1900 Memel, German Empire
- Died: April 5, 1990 (aged 89–90)
- Party: Labour
- Education: Heidelberg University; University of London

Irene Chaplin (1900–1990), known as Ina, was a German-born British politician who served on London County Council.

Born in Memel, in East Prussia, Imperial Germany (modern Klaipėda, Lithuania) as Irene Marcousé, she grew up in Brussels, and attended the University of Heidelberg and University of London. In 1930, she moved to Holborn, where she was a founder of the Holborn Youth Centre, and joined the Labour Party.

In 1937, Marcousé stood unsuccessfully for Holborn Metropolitan Borough Council, but she won a seat in a 1939 by-election. She stood in the 1945 United Kingdom general election in Holborn, missing out on election by only 925 votes. Despite this, the Labour Party won control of the council, for the first time, and Marcousé became leader of the council, and also chair of the housing committee. Given the destruction of housing during the Blitz, there was widespread homelessness in the area. Marcousé ordered the town clerk to sign 500 requisition notices and personally identified 500 empty properties, nailing the notices to the doors, and enabling 500 homeless families to find accommodation. She also arranged for a bomb-damaged swimming pool to reopen as an open air pool, opened a furniture store, social centre, information centre, library, and children's playground, and organised entertainment in many of the borough's squares. The council also commissioned new flats, in the Great Ormond Street area. She also attracted criticism for permitting the construction of offices, including new council offices, and for prioritising wealthier families for the newly built housing, and the party lost control of the council in the 1949 elections.

In 1946, Chaplin was elected to the London County Council, representing Islington East. She stood in Putney unsuccessfully at the 1950 United Kingdom general election, and thereafter devoted her time to the LCC. She remained on the LCC until 1965, when it was replaced by the Greater London Council (GLC). On the new body, she first represented Islington, then Hackney, and finally Hackney South and Shoreditch, retiring in 1977. She additionally served on the Inner London Education Authority, and for a period was its deputy chair.

Later in life, Chaplin suffered a stroke, and thereafter used a wheelchair. She died in 1990.
