= Yitzchak Meir Helfgot =

American Hasidic cantor (born 1969)

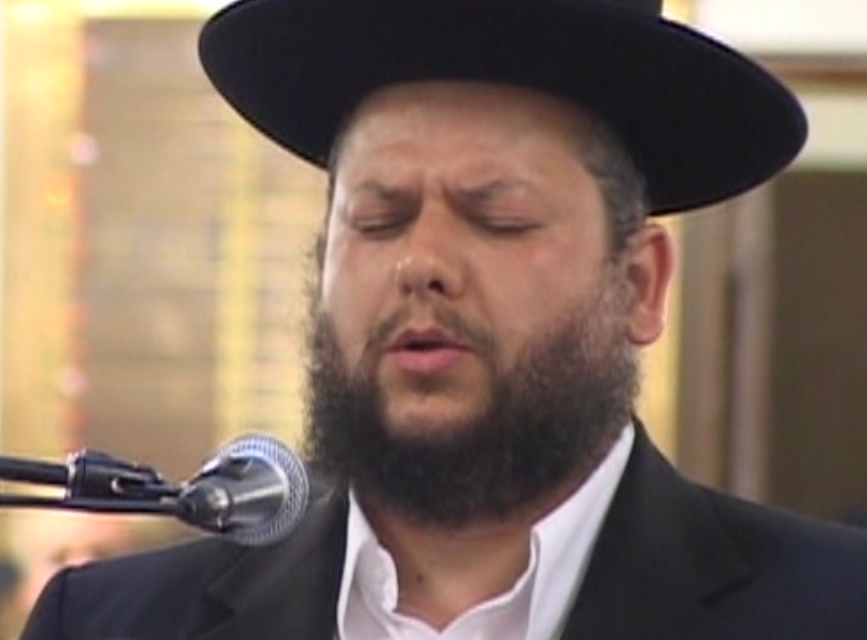
- Helfgot in 2006

Background information
- Born: January 1, 1969 (age 57); Bnei Brak, Israel
- Occupation: cantor
- Years active: 2002–present
- Label: Sony Music
- Website: cantorhelfgot.com

Yitzchak Meir Helfgot (Hebrew: יצחק מאיר הלפגוט, Yiddish: יצחק מאיר העלפגאט) is an American Hasidic cantor, known for his vocal dexterity and range. Like some operatic tenors he is capable of sustaining long passages in the difficult uppermost tessitura, while also possessing overt technical facility in executing ornate melismas.

== Career ==
In addition to having held several prestigious cantorial posts in Europe and the United States, Helfgot has performed in concerts all over the world. In December 2006, under the auspices of Cantors World, he performed a solo concert at the Metropolitan Opera House with the New York Philharmonic directed by Mordechai Sobol. In January 2007, he sang in Madison Square Garden to an audience of 30,000 at a Siyum HaShas. In December 2007, he performed at Lincoln Center in Avery Fisher Hall, again accompanied by the New York Philharmonic, in a tribute to Cantor Moshe Koussevitzky. He shared a stage with Cantor Shimon Farkas of Central Synagogue in Sydney, Australia, Cantor Yehuda Niassof, and rock star Jimmy Barnes in August 2009. In December 2010, he performed at the White House during a Chanukah menorah lighting ceremony. He has also performed in distinguished venues, synagogues and concert halls in almost every European city and the world over, including the Warsaw Opera House in Poland, Henry Crown Hall in Jerusalem and Carnegie Hall in New York City.

His solo albums, recorded with a renowned authority on cantorial music, Dr. Mordechai Sobol, led to popular success. Despite the bombast of the musical arrangements, the vocal quality harks back to the golden age of chazzanut, where legendary Jewish cantors like Yossele Rosenblatt and Moshe Koussevitsky produced albums that featured both devotional prayers and traditional Jewish folk songs.

In 2012, Helfgot broke new ground with the unprecedented collaboration between a cantor and a world-class classical musician. Renowned violinist Itzhak Perlman spearheaded a project with Sony to record sophisticated new arrangements of famous cantorial pieces, reworked to include a dual focus on the voice and violin. The music director for this project was Hankus Netsky, and the conductor was Australian-born Russell Ger. A promotional tour with this assembled team saw sold-out performances at the Barclays Center in Brooklyn, Boston's Symphony Hall, Long Island's Tilles Performing Arts Center, Toronto's Roy Thomson Hall, and a crowd of 15,000 at the Hollywood Bowl. A Public Broadcasting Service special titled "Rejoice" was also filmed in New York City in late 2013, and further performances took place at the Mizner Park Amphitheater in Boca Raton and the Ravinia Festival.

Helfgot is chief cantor of the Park East Synagogue in New York City. He earns approximately $250,000 a year, making him the highest paid cantor in the world.

== Discography ==
=== Solo albums ===
- Borchi Nafshi (2002)
- Habet (2004)
- Avot (2005)
- Mevaser Tov (2007)
- Helfgot 5 (2015)

=== Collaborations ===
- Shirat Yisrael (2006) with Chaim Eliezer Hershtik & Israel Rand
- Eternal Echoes (2012) with Itzhak Perlman

== See also ==
- Hazzan
