= Islington South and Finsbury (electoral division) =

Electoral division in Greater London, 1973–1986

- Former electoral division for the Greater London Council
- Islington South and Finsbury electoral division boundaries
- District: Islington
- Electorate: 43,979 (1973); 36,527 (1977); 38,393 (1981)
- Area: 487 hectares (4.87 km^{2})

Former electoral division
- Created: 1973
- Abolished: 1986
- Member: 1
- Created from: Islington

Islington South and Finsbury was an electoral division for the purposes of elections to the Greater London Council. The constituency elected one councillor for a four-year term in 1973, 1977 and 1981, with the final term extended for an extra year ahead of the abolition of the Greater London Council.

== History ==
It was planned to use the same boundaries as the Westminster Parliament constituencies for election of councillors to the Greater London Council (GLC), as had been the practice for elections to the predecessor London County Council, but those that existed in 1965 crossed the Greater London boundary. Until new constituencies could be settled, the 32 London boroughs were used as electoral areas. The London Borough of Islington formed the Islington electoral division. This was used for the Greater London Council elections in 1964, 1967 and 1970.

The new constituencies were settled following the Second Periodic Review of Westminster constituencies and the new electoral division matched the boundaries of the Islington South and Finsbury parliamentary constituency.

It covered an area of 487 hectares (4.87 km^{2}).

== Elections ==
The Islington South and Finsbury constituency was used for the Greater London Council elections in 1973, 1977 and 1981. One councillor was elected at each election using first-past-the-post voting.

=== 1973 election ===
The fourth election to the GLC (and first using revised boundaries) was held on 12 April 1973. The electorate was 43,979 and one Labour Party councillor was elected. The turnout was 30.4%. The councillor was elected for a three-year term. This was extended for an extra year in 1976 when the electoral cycle was switched to four-yearly.

1973 Greater London Council election: Islington South and Finsbury
Party	Candidate	Votes	%	±%
Labour	Arthur Ernest Wicks	9,850	73.74	
Conservative	S. G. Parker	2,969	22.23	
Communist	M. Betteridge	538	4.03	
Turnout				
Labour win (new seat)				

=== 1977 election ===
The fifth election to the GLC (and second using revised boundaries) was held on 5 May 1977. The electorate was 36,527 and one Labour Party councillor was elected. The turnout was 35.6%. The councillor was elected for a four-year term.

1977 Greater London Council election: Islington South and Finsbury
Party	Candidate	Votes	%	±%
Labour	Arthur Ernest Wicks	5,911	42.01	
Conservative	C. I. Price	5,589	39.71	
National Front	P. T. Kavanagh	1,453	10.33	
Liberal	A. J. Dean	734	5.22	
Communist	E. C. Archer	380	2.70	
Turnout				
Labour hold		Swing		

=== 1981 election ===
The sixth and final election to the GLC (and third using revised boundaries) was held on 7 May 1981. The electorate was 38,393 and one Labour Party councillor was elected. The turnout was 37.4%. The councillor was elected for a four-year term, extended by an extra year by the Local Government (Interim Provisions) Act 1984, ahead of the abolition of the council.

1981 Greater London Council election: Islington South and Finsbury
Party	Candidate	Votes	%	±%
Labour	Frances Maine Morrell	7,296	50.85	
Conservative	John D. E. Gallagher	3,014	21.00	
Social Democratic Alliance	John P. Hudson	2,707	18.87	
Liberal	John P. Hudson	696	4.85	
National Front	John B. Donegan	447	3.11	
Constitutional Movement	Francis T. Theobald	109	0.76	
Socialist (GB)	Barry K. McNeeney	83	0.58	
Turnout				
Labour hold		Swing		
