= Islington Central (electoral division) =

Electoral division in Greater London, 1973–1986

- Former electoral division for the Greater London Council
- District: Islington
- Electorate: 47,351 (1973); 42,145 (1977); 41,600 (1981)
- Area: 530 hectares (5.3 km^{2})

Former electoral division
- Created: 1973
- Abolished: 1986
- Member: 1
- Created from: Islington

Islington Central was an electoral division for the purposes of elections to the Greater London Council. The constituency elected one councillor for a four-year term in 1973, 1977 and 1981, with the final term extended for an extra year ahead of the abolition of the Greater London Council.

== History ==
It was planned to use the same boundaries as the Westminster Parliament constituencies for election of councillors to the Greater London Council (GLC), as had been the practice for elections to the predecessor London County Council, but those that existed in 1965 crossed the Greater London boundary. Until new constituencies could be settled, the 32 London boroughs were used as electoral areas. The London Borough of Islington formed the Islington electoral division. This was used for the Greater London Council elections in 1964, 1967 and 1970.

The new constituencies were settled following the Second Periodic Review of Westminster constituencies and the new electoral division matched the boundaries of the Islington Central parliamentary constituency.

It covered an area of 530 hectares (5.3 km^{2}).

== Elections ==
The Islington Central constituency was used for the Greater London Council elections in 1973, 1977 and 1981. One councillor was elected at each election using first-past-the-post voting.

=== 1973 election ===
The fourth election to the GLC (and first using revised boundaries) was held on 12 April 1973. The electorate was 47,351 and one Labour Party councillor was elected. The turnout was 29.7%. The councillor was elected for a three-year term. This was extended for an extra year in 1976 when the electoral cycle was switched to four-yearly.

1973 Greater London Council election: Islington Central
Party	Candidate	Votes	%	±%
Labour	Evelyn Joyce Denington	8,996	63.93	
Conservative	B. A. Devonald-Lewis	2,936	20.87	
Liberal	A. A. S. Butt Philip	2,139	15.20	
Turnout				
Labour win (new seat)				

=== 1977 election ===
The fifth election to the GLC (and second using revised boundaries) was held on 5 May 1977. The electorate was 42,145 and one Labour Party councillor was elected. The turnout was 35.0%. The councillor was elected for a four-year term.

1977 Greater London Council election: Islington Central
Party	Candidate	Votes	%	±%
Labour	Simon John Turney	6,559	44.52	
Conservative	A. H. S. Hull	5,829	39.56	
National Front	S. A. Chaney	1,274	8.64	
Liberal	Margot J. Dunn	1,076	7.30	
Turnout				
Labour hold		Swing		

=== 1981 election ===
The sixth and final election to the GLC (and third using revised boundaries) was held on 7 May 1981. The electorate was 41,600 and one Labour Party councillor was elected. The turnout was 38.0%. The councillor was elected for a four-year term, extended by an extra year by the Local Government (Interim Provisions) Act 1984, ahead of the abolition of the council.

1981 Greater London Council election: Islington Central
Party	Candidate	Votes	%	±%
Labour	Simon John Turney	9,675	61.23	
Conservative	Peter R. Crockford	3,788	23.98	
Liberal	Margot J. Dunn	1,744	11.04	
NNF	John R. Smith	333	2.11	
Workers Revolutionary	Sylvia Lincoln	133	0.84	
Constitutional Movement	Philip Holden	118	0.75	
Turnout				
Labour hold		Swing		
