= Park East Synagogue =

Modern Orthodox synagogue in Manhattan, New York

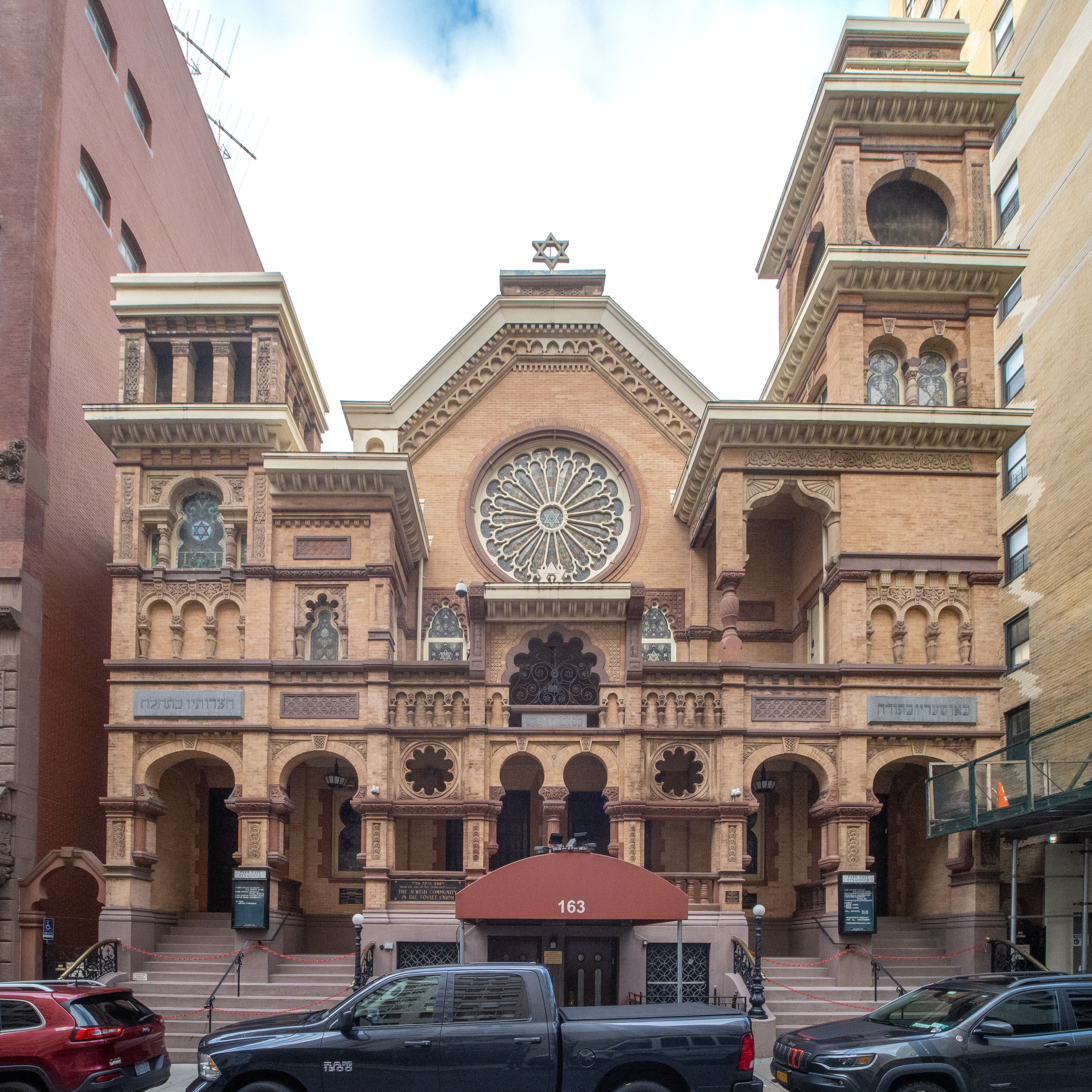
- Park East Synagogue in 2021

- Location in Manhattan

Religion
- Affiliation: Modern Orthodox Judaism
- Ecclesiastical or organisational status: Synagogue
- Leadership: Rabbi Arthur Schneier; Rabbi Daniel Friedman, Acting Associate Rabbi
- Status: Active

Location
- Location: 163 East 67th Street, Upper East Side, Manhattan, New York City, New York 10065
- Country: United States
- Coordinates: 40°46′1″N 73°57′48″W

Architecture
- Architect: Schneider & Herter
- Type: Synagogue
- Style: Byzantine Revival; Moorish Revival; Romanesque Revival
- Established: 1890 (as a congregation)
- Completed: 1890
- Dome: 2 (since removed)

Website
- parkeastsynagogue.org
- Park East Synagogue, Congregation Zichron Ephraim
- U.S. National Register of Historic Places
- New York City Landmark
- NRHP reference No.: 83001738
- NYCL No.: 1056

Significant dates
- Added to NRHP: August 18, 1983
- Designated NYCL: January 8, 1980

The Park East Synagogue is a Modern Orthodox Jewish synagogue originally called Congregation Zichron Ephraim at 163 East 67th Street on the Upper East Side of Manhattan in New York City, New York, United States. Built in 1890, the synagogue building was designated as a New York City Landmark in 1980 and listed on the National Register of Historic Places in 1983.

== Building ==
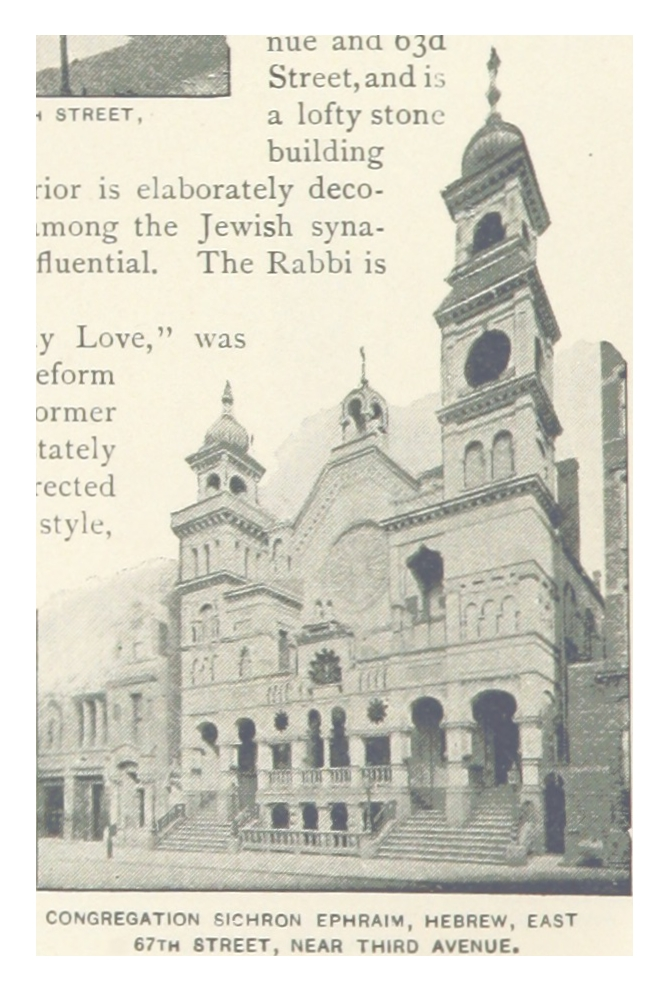
Domes were present in 1893

The building was built in 1889–1890. The architects were Schneider and Herter, who designed numerous tenements in Manhattan's Lower East Side and Hell's Kitchen neighborhoods.

The building is built in the Moorish Revival style and features a prominent rose window. One of its most remarkable characteristics is the asymmetrical twin towers, as the eastern tower is taller. In comparison, most other synagogues of the period featured twin towers of similar height. The towers are also adorned differently. Each of the towers originally was also topped by a bulbous dome that has since been removed. It is one of fewer than one hundred surviving nineteenth-century American synagogues. The synagogue building is listed on the National Register of Historic Places.

Over the doorway, engraved in granite and written in Hebrew, is a verse from Psalm 100. "Enter into His Gates with Thanksgiving and into His courts with praise."

== Clergy ==
Congregation Zichron Ephraim was established by Rabbi Bernard Drachman and Jonas Weil to promote Orthodox Judaism as an alternative to Reform Judaism popular on the Upper East Side.

Rabbi Drachman served as spiritual leader for fifty-one years. He died in 1945. Rabbi Zev Zahavy was appointed rabbi of the synagogue on September 1, 1952. He was known as a dynamic spokesman for Orthodox Judaism and many of his sermons were reported on in the New York Times. He and his wife Edith, a noted educator, founded the Park East Day School. On March 16, 1957, Robert Briscoe, the Jewish Lord Mayor of Dublin, carrying his tallis bag, visited and prayed at the synagogue on Shabbos morning.

Since 1962, the synagogue's rabbi has been Arthur Schneier. Rabbi Schneier serves Park East Synagogue full-time while also drawing a salary from the Appeal of Conscience Foundation he founded. This leadership structure was criticized in 2021 by Daniel L. Kurtz, former head of the Charities Bureau at the New York State Attorney General's Office, when he alleged that Park East has failed to hold regular membership meetings to ensure financial transparency. Kurtz also alleged that Park East's trustees are directly appointed not elected, in a process which he has called “blatantly illegal”.

Rabbi Harold Einsidler is the religious spiritual organizer; his wife Toby is the office and youth leader. The synagogue's chief cantor is Yitzchak Meir Helfgot.

In a letter sent to synagogue membership on October 4, 2021, a group of congregants expressed concern with the synagogue's trajectory and appointed committee which included a longtime assistant rabbi, Benjamin Goldschmidt, the son of Rabbi Pinchas Goldschmidt. Less than two weeks later, Goldschmidt was fired. The dismissal of Goldschmidt sparked a protest within the synagogue community and a public objection from Israeli government minister Yoel Razvozov. In February 2022, Goldschmidt and his wife Avital Chizhik-Goldschmidt announced that they would create the Altneu along with former Park East members. As of 2024, Rabbi Daniel Friedman is the Acting Associate Rabbi.

== Activities ==
=== Curricular ===
The Park East Day School educates children from early childhood through eighth grade.

=== Notable events ===
In 2008, Pope Benedict XVI visited the synagogue in the midst of a visit to New York City. This was the third papal visit to a synagogue and the only such visit in the United States. In 2016, members of the synagogue heckled and jeered U.N. Director General Ban Ki-moon as he gave an address in honor of International Holocaust Remembrance Day.

In November 2025, in the wake of a rowdy and chaotic protest at the entryway of Park East Synagogue, which included chants of “Death to the IDF” and “Globalize the intifada,” and an exhortation that "We need to make them scared!," New York State Assemblyman Micah Lasher said: "If you are standing outside a synagogue calling for ‘intifada revolution,’ you are not peacefully protesting. You are trying to intimidate and create fear among Jews, and that is never acceptable.

On May 5, 2026, the synagogue hosted the Great Israeli Real Estate Event, an expo for land sales in Israel and occupied Palestine. The land sales included sales for homes in Jewish settlements in the West Bank, which are widely considered illegal under international law. Due to this, the event stirred up much controversy—including criticism of the event from Mayor Zohran Mamdani—and both protestors and counter-protestors rallied outside the synagogue during the event.

== Notable members ==
- Bernard Drachman
- Yitzchak Meir Helfgot
- Henry H. Minskoff
- Tamir Sapir
- Edwin Schlossberg
- Arthur Schneier
- Stuart Subotnick

== See also ==
- List of New York City Designated Landmarks in Manhattan from 59th to 110th Streets
- National Register of Historic Places listings in Manhattan from 59th to 110th Streets
