= Schneider & Herter =

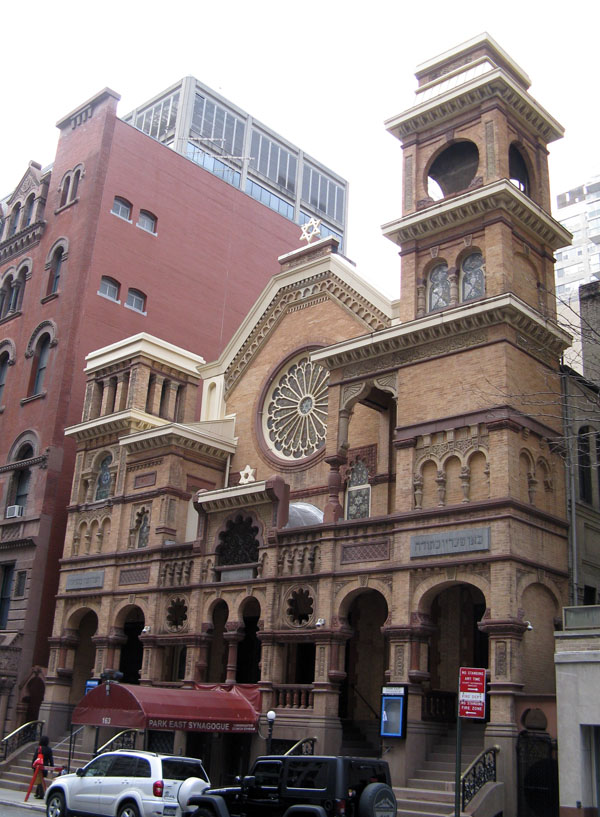
Park East Synagogue, 1889-1890

Schneider and Herter was an American architectural firm in the late-nineteenth and early twentieth-century New York City. It was formed around 1887 by Ernest W. Schneider and Henry Herter, and thrived designing "tenements, flats, and industrial buildings, primarily on the Lower East Side...principally for German-Jewish clients with ethnic backgrounds similar to theirs." The firm favored the Romanesque Revival architectural style.

The firm was founded as Schneider & Co. and designed more than a hundred multiple dwellings in Manhattan, most of which have been demolished.

The main German-Jewish clients were Jonas Weil and Bernard Mayer for whom they designed numerous multiple dwellings. Other work involved German-Jewish synagogues, including Park East Synagogue (New York City). 163 East 67th Street (1889–90), financed by Weil, and Congregation Kol Israel Arshi, 20-22 Forsyth Street (1892), which was later sold to the Hellenic Orthodox Community.

== Works ==
- Park East Synagogue (New York City). 163 East 67th Street (1889–90)
- 731-735 E 5th Street (1890–91, French flats)
- 233-35 Delancey Street (1891–92, French flat)
- Congregation Kol Israel Arshi, 20-22 Forsyth Street (1892), (now Hellenic Orthodox Community).
- 858 West End Avenue, 102nd Street (1892–93)
- 141 W Broadway Warehouse Project (1893)
- 79-81 Perry Street (1895, five-story apt bldg)
- 309-317 W 93rd Street (1901-2)
- 363 West 57th Street (1890)
- 223-225 West 10th Street
- 90 Bedford Street (the "Friends Apartment")
