= Great Israeli Real Estate Event =

Real estate exhibition

- Organiser: My Home in Israel
- People: Gideon Katz

The Great Israeli Real Estate Event is an annual exhibition of real estate properties being sold in the state of Israel, and in the West Bank, Palestine. The event is organized by the Israeli real estate company My Home in Israel. The exhibition occurs in the United States, Canada, and the United Kingdom. The exhibition lists properties inside the internationally recognized borders of Israel. It also lists properties for sale in illegal Israeli settlements in the West Bank (including East Jerusalem). The event is accused of selling stolen Palestinian land, and helping individuals to profit from war crimes and apartheid.

== Background ==
The event is organized by Israeli real estate firm My Home in Israel, produced by Gideon Katz, who works for an Israeli public relations company. My Home in Israel has a team of US-based real estate agents.

Previous real estate events held by My Home in Israel at the Adas Torah synagogue in Los Angeles led to protests by pro-Palestinian organizations, which alleged that the event promoted the sale of land located in the illegally occupied Palestinian territories. The protests were subsequently condemned by then-President Joe Biden, Governor of California Gavin Newsom, and Mayor of Los Angeles Karen Bass.

== History ==
The exhibition is held at synagogues, including the Park East Synagogue in Manhattan.

In 2024, the exhibition was held in several Canadian cities, and later in New York and New Jersey. The expo in Brooklyn was cancelled due to protests.

In 2026, the exhibition was scheduled to stop in Toronto, Manhattan, Five Towns, Teaneck, Monsey, Flatbush, and Queens.

=== 2026 Park East Synagogue event ===
On May 5, 2026, the Park East Synagogue in Manhattan hosted the Great Israeli Real Estate Event, an expo for land sales in Israel. The event's website included references to listings in Gush Etzion, a group of 20 settlements in the West Bank located southeast of Jerusalem that are considered illegal settlements under international law.

Mayor of New York Zohran Mamdani condemned the event, with a spokesperson saying, "Mayor Mamdani is deeply opposed to the real estate expo this evening that includes the promotion of the sale of land in settlements in the Occupied West Bank," adding, "These settlements are illegal under international law and deeply tied to the ongoing displacement of Palestinians."

Protests against the event were held by groups including the Palestinian Assembly for Liberation Al-Awda in New York City and New Jersey (PAL-Awda NY/NJ).

=== 2026 London ===
When the event was planned to be held in London, United Kingdom, in June 2026, Liberal Democrats’ defence spokesman, Calum Miller, called for the event to be banned in the House of Commons, saying, "So, will the Government intervene to ban the event, unless assurances can be made that no properties in illegal settlements will be advertised?"

Labour MP Debbie Abrahams called the sale of Palestinian land at the event "“flouting international law".

The event was held at the Edgware United Synagogue, after which the U.K. government referred the incident to the Advertising Standards Authority, requesting that it ensure UK law and regulations are upheld. In a statement the U.K. government said "We completely oppose the advertisement of properties for sale in settlements, which are illegal under international law."

Amnesty International UK condemned the event and said that it "profits from war crimes and apartheid".
