= Policy Studies Institute =

British think-tank and research institute

The Policy Studies Institute (PSI) was a British think-tank and research institute. PSI began in 1931 as Political and Economic Planning and became the Policy Studies Institute in 1978 on its merger with the Centre for Studies in Social Policy (est 1972). PSI became an independent subsidiary of the University of Westminster in 1998 and merged with the university in 2009. The director of PSI at the time of its dissolution in 2018 was Ben Shaw.

PSI prioritised sustainable development, with particular reference to the environment, policy and practice as the present area of greatest need, an initiative spearheaded by Katherine Saunt, and more recently Harry Pincus.

It was based in the Faculty of Architecture and the Built Environment at the University of Westminster.

PSI's research themes included: energy and climate change; resource use and the circular economy; mobility and transport; the role of communities and business in delivering a sustainable future; cities, innovation and sustainability transitions; public behaviours, attitudes and policy; and policy and research evaluation.

From its Central London base, PSI collaborated with an international network of researchers and centres working on environment and sustainable development policy; PSI coordinated the SDRN.

PSI was politically neutral and had no connections to any political party, commercial interests or pressure groups. The institute's income was derived from a variety of sources, including government departments, research and higher education funding councils, the European Commission, charitable foundations and business.

Leading researchers who worked at the institute include Mayer Hillman, Paul Ekins and Tariq Modood.
