= Arthur Wicks =

English politician

Arthur Ernest Wicks (1915–2006) was a Labour politician and the last chairman of the London County Council.

A conscientious objector during the Second World War, he was first elected to the Shoreditch Metropolitan Borough Council in the 1950s, and became chairman of housing, at a time when Shoreditch had one of England's highest concentrations of municipal housing.

Elected to the LCC for Shoreditch and Finsbury in 1952, he gave his time to housing and parks. County Hall, London, a Labour stronghold since 1934, was a pioneering model for Labour ideas and plans, including comprehensive education, school music, housing development and the establishment of the South Bank complex. As LCC chairman from 1963 to 1965, Arthur oversaw the transition in 1964 to the new Greater London Council. He represented Hackney on the GLC from 1964 to 1967, then Islington from 1967 to 1973 and finally Islington South and Finsbury from 1973 to 1981.

He also owned two shops and a cafe in Islington. His main shop, selling everything from paraffin and groceries to hardware, served as an informal advice surgery. His wife, Daisy, died in 1992 and he was survived by his sons. One of his sons – Malcolm Wicks – who was a Labour Minister, died in September 2012 after a long illness, aged 65.

Civic offices
Preceded by Reginald Stamp	Chairman of the London County Council; 1963 – 1965	Succeeded by Office abolished
Preceded by Frank Abbott	Chairman of the Greater London Council; 1973–1974	Succeeded by David Pitt
