= List of chairmen of the Greater London Council =

Chairman of the Greater London Council
- Coat of arms of Greater London
- Style: The Right Honourable
- Type: Chair
- Seat: County Hall
- Term length: 1 year
- Constituting instrument: London Government Act 1963
- Precursor: Chairman of the London County Council
- Formation: 1 April 1965
- First holder: Harold Shearman
- Final holder: Tony Banks
- Abolished: 31 March 1986
- Superseded by: Chair of the London Assembly

List of chairmen of the Greater London Council.

== Background ==
The chairman of the Greater London Council was a statutory role, to be elected annually by members of council at the first meeting of each municipal year. It was a non-political role analogous to a mayor in the London borough councils.

The chairman was entitled to use the style "The Right Honourable" as had been the practice for the Chairman of the London County Council.

=== Regalia ===
The chairman, vice-chairman and deputy chairman each wore ceremonial badges, that included the coat of arms of Greater London. They were created from older London County Council badges that were modified, and were first worn at a meeting on 25 January 1966. One of these is badges is now worn by the Chair of the London Assembly.

== List of chairman ==
No.	Chairman	Took office	Left office	Vice-chairman	Ref.
1	Harold Shearman	1964	1966	Muriel Forbes	
2	Herbert Ferguson	1966	1967	John Branagan	
3	Percy Rugg	1967	1968	Thomas Mitcheson	
4	Louis Gluckstein	1968	1969	Geoffrey Aplin	
5	Leslie Freeman	1969	1970	Benita Barham	
6	Peter Black	1970	1971	Bernard Brown	
7	Robert Mitchell	1971	1972	George Everitt	
8	Frank Abbott	1972	1973	John Mason	
9	Arthur Wicks	1973	1974	Frank Cooper	
10	David Pitt	1974	1975	Ben Mason	
11	Evelyn Denington	1975	1976	Thomas Jenkinson	
12	Tom Ponsonby	1976	1977	Peter Russell	
13	Lawrence Bains	1977	1978	Stanley Bolton	
14	Harold Mote	1978	1979	Gladys Morgan	
15	Robert Vigars	1979	1980	John Dobson	
16	Bernard Brook-Partridge	1980	1981	William Clack	
17	John Ward	1981	1982	Charlie Rossi	
18	Ashley Bramall	1982	1983	Charlie Rossi	
19	Harvey Hinds	1983	1984	Elgar Handy	
20	Illtyd Harrington	1984	1985	Harry Kay	
21	Tony Banks	1985	1986	Harry Kay	
