= Bernard Drachman =

American rabbi

Rabbi Dr. Bernard Drachman (June 27, 1861, in New York City – March 12, 1945 in New York City) was a leader of Orthodox Judaism in the United States at the beginning of the twentieth century.

== Early life and education ==
Drachman was born to parents who were immigrants from Galicia and Bavaria. After studying in a Hebrew preparatory school, Drachman earned a B.A. from Columbia College. He earned a scholarship at the Jewish Theological Seminary of Breslau where he received his rabbinic ordination. He also earned a PhD from the University of Heidelberg.

== Career ==
In 1890, Drachman began serving as rabbi in the Park East Synagogue, where he led for the next fifty-five years. Drachman was president of the Orthodox Union and professor at the Jewish Theological Seminary.

He translated Samson Raphael Hirsch's The Nineteen Letters of Ben Uziel into English.

This was ironic, as the works of Zecharias Frankel of Breslau, a man Drachman considered an important Orthodox leader, had been condemned by Hirsch as heretical. Historically, Frankel is considered the founder or at least a forerunner of Conservative Judaism.

== Family ==
His son, Theodore S. Drachman, was a public health official and published novelist.
