= Hackney South and Shoreditch (electoral division) =

Electoral division in Greater London, 1973–1986

- Former electoral division for the Greater London Council
- Hackney South and Shoreditch electoral division boundaries
- District: Hackney
- Electorate: 50,500 (1973); 44,364 (1977); 43,361 (1981)
- Area: 581 hectares (5.81 km^{2})

Former electoral division
- Created: 1973
- Abolished: 1986
- Member: 1
- Created from: Hackney

Hackney South and Shoreditch was an electoral division for the purposes of elections to the Greater London Council. The constituency elected one councillor for a four-year term in 1973, 1977 and 1981, with the final term extended for an extra year ahead of the abolition of the Greater London Council.

== History ==
It was planned to use the same boundaries as the Westminster Parliament constituencies for election of councillors to the Greater London Council (GLC), as had been the practice for elections to the predecessor London County Council, but those that existed in 1965 crossed the Greater London boundary. Until new constituencies could be settled, the 32 London boroughs were used as electoral areas. The London Borough of Hackney formed the Hackney electoral division. This was used for the Greater London Council elections in 1964, 1967 and 1970.

The new constituencies were settled following the Second Periodic Review of Westminster constituencies and the new electoral division matched the boundaries of the Hackney South and Shoreditch parliamentary constituency.

The area was in a long-term period of population decline that was yet to reverse. The electorate reduced from 50,500 in 1973 to 43,361 in 1981. It covered an area of 581 hectares (5.81 km^{2}).

== Elections ==
The Hackney South and Shoreditch constituency was used for the Greater London Council elections in 1973, 1977 and 1981. One councillor was elected at each election using first-past-the-post voting.

=== 1973 election ===
The fourth election to the GLC (and first using revised boundaries) was held on 12 April 1973. The electorate was 50,500 and one Labour Party councillor was elected. The turnout was 21.4%. The councillor was elected for a three-year term. This was extended for an extra year in 1976 when the electoral cycle was switched to four-yearly.

1973 Greater London Council election: Hackney South and Shoreditch
Party	Candidate	Votes	%	±%
Labour	Irene Chaplin	8,473	78.22	
Conservative	E. Laws	1,586	14.64	
Independent	V. A. C. Curtis	325	3.00	
Action Party for Britain First	D. H. England	290	2.68	
Independent	B. M. Lampert	154	1.42	
Turnout				
Labour win (new seat)				

=== 1977 election ===
The fifth election to the GLC (and second using revised boundaries) was held on 5 May 1977. The electorate was 44,364 and one Labour Party councillor was elected. The turnout was 34.2%. The councillor was elected for a four-year term.

1977 Greater London Council election: Hackney South and Shoreditch
Party	Candidate	Votes	%	±%
Labour	Joan M. Morgan	7,515	49.47	
Conservative	C. St. G. C. Stanbrook	3,855	25.38	
National Front	D. Bruce	2,886	19.00	
Liberal	J. D. Roberts	716	4.71	
Independent Liberal	D. Hains	218	1.44	
Turnout				
Labour hold		Swing		

=== 1981 election ===
The sixth and final election to the GLC (and third using revised boundaries) was held on 7 May 1981. The electorate was 43,361 and one Labour Party councillor was elected. The turnout was 34.0%. The councillor was elected for a four-year term, extended by an extra year by the Local Government (Interim Provisions) Act 1984, ahead of the abolition of the council.

1981 Greater London Council election: Hackney South and Shoreditch
Party	Candidate	Votes	%	±%
Labour	Joan M. Morgan	8,410	57.13	
Liberal	Stephen J.C. Walkley	2,585	17.56	
Conservative	Bernard Lansman	2,287	15.53	
National Front	Gerald Viner	636	4.32	
Enoch Powell is Right	George Williams	399	2.71	
Communist	Helen L. Rosenthal	321	2.18	
Workers Revolutionary	Peter Curtis	86	0.58	
Turnout				
Labour hold		Swing		
