= Appeal of Conscience Foundation =

Founded by Rabbi Arthur Schneier in 1965, the Appeal of Conscience Foundation is an interfaith partnership of corporate and spiritual leaders from all faiths who come together to promote "peace, tolerance and ethnic conflict resolution."

== Mission ==
The Appeal's philosophy is that freedom, democracy and human rights are basic principles, and if they are granted, nations of the world have their best hope for "peace, security and shared prosperity."

"A crime committed in the name of religion is the greatest crime against religion,” is the organization's mantra. Following the act of September 11th, the ACF has rallied religious leaders worldwide to take a stand against terrorism and to use their influence to halt violence and promote tolerance.

The true motivation of the Appeal has been called into question following the honoring of Indonesian president Yudhoyono despite controversy within Indonesia and the ongoing genocide Yudhoyono's government is overseeing in West Papua.

== Activities ==
Delegations from the group meet and have met with religious and government leaders throughout the world promoting peace and democracy. Some of its work has been in conducted in Albania, Argentina, Armenia, Bulgaria, People's Republic of China, the Commonwealth of Independent States (CIS), Cuba, Czech Republic, El Salvador, Germany, the Vatican City, Hungary, India, Indonesia, Ireland, Japan, Morocco, Panama, Poland, Romania, Russia, Slovak Republic, Switzerland, Spain, Turkey, Ukraine, United Kingdom and the former Yugoslavia.

The Foundation frequently hosts diplomatic and clerical groups from abroad to acquaint them with the religious life in America society.

== World Statesman of the Year Award ==
The 2023 recipient was Former US secretary of State Henry Kissinger.

The 2022 recipient was Italy's Prime Minister, Mario Draghi.

The 2021 recipient was Former Prime Minister of Japan, Shinzo Abe.

The 2019 recipient was Prime Minister of Singapore, Lee Hsien Loong.

The 2016 recipient was French President, François Hollande.

The 2015 recipient was British Prime Minister, David Cameron.

The 2014 recipient was Mexican President, Enrique Peña Nieto.

The 2013 recipient was Indonesian President Susilo Bambang Yudhoyono.

The 2012 recipient was Canada's Prime Minister, Stephen Harper.

Complete List:

20 Sep 2011 Address by President Lee Myung-bak President Lee Myung-bak of The Republic of Korea, recipient of the 2009 World Statesman Award.

12 May 2011 Address by Francois Delattre of France On behalf of President Nicolas Sarkozy of France, Ambassador Francois Delattre presented Rabbi Arthur Schneier with the Legion of Honor in recognition of his tireless efforts to promote and support religious freedom, human rights and interfaith tolerance all over the world

23 Sep 2010 Address by Bill Burns, US Under Secretary of State for Political Affairs in absence of Prime Minister Manmohan Singh of India, recipient of the 2010 World Statesman Award.

22 Sep 2009 Address by Ivan Lewis on behalf of PM Gordon Brown The Gordon Brown, Prime Minister of the United Kingdom received the 2009 World Statesman Award

22 Sep 2009 Address by Muhtar Kent Muhtar Kent, Chairman & CEO, The Coca-Cola Company received the 2009 Appeal of Conscience Award

22 Sep 2009 Address by Bernard J. Arnault Bernard J. Arnault, Chairman & CEO, LVMH Moët Hennessy Louis Vuitton received the 2009 Appeal of Conscience Award

23 Sep 2008 Address by Jeffrey R. Immelt, President & CEO, GE Jeffrey Immelt received the 2008 Appeal of Conscience Award

23 Sep 2008 Address by Mayor Michael R. Bloomberg Mayor Bloomberg delivers speech accepting the 2008 Appeal of Conscience Foundation Public Service Award

23 Sep 2008 Remarks by Deputy Secretary John D. Negroponte Deputy Secretary highlights honorees at the 2008 ACF Annual Awards Dinner

23 Sep 2008 Address by Nicolas Sarkozy President of the French Republic is recipient of the 2008 Appeal of Conscience World Statesman Award

23 Sep 2008 Address by Henry A. Kissinger Henry Kissinger gives address on behalf of Nicolas Sarkozy, President of the French Republic, at the ACF 2008 Annual Awards Dinner

21 Sep 2005 Foreign Minister Alexander Downer Acceptance of the World Statesman Award on behalf of the Prime Minister of Australia, John Howard, at the 40th anniversary dinner of the Appeal of Conscience Foundation

21 Sep 2005 Jorma Ollila, Chairman and CEO, Nokia Acceptance of the Appeal of Conscience Award Jorma Ollila, Chairman and CEO, Nokia Appeal of Conscience Foundation 40th Annual Awards Dinner New York 21 September 2005

21 Sep 2005 Peter G. Peterson, Chairman, Blackstone Group Honorable Peter G. Peterson, Chairman, Council on Foreign Relations, at the Appeal of Conscience Foundation 40th Anniversary Dinner 21 September 2005

20 Sep 2004 Sir John Bond, HSBC Chairman, 2004 Dinner Sir John Bond, HSBC Chairman, APPEAL OF CONSCIENCE FOUNDATION DINNER

14 Oct 2003 Address by José Mará Aznar President of the Government of Spain, recipient of the 2003 Appeal of Conscience World Statesman Award

14 Oct 2003 Address by Dr. Josef Ackermann Chairman Group Executive Committee and Spokesman of the Board of Managing Directors, Deutsche Bank Recipient of the 2003 Appeal of Conscience Award

1 Oct 2002 Address by Rabbi Arthur Schneier Appeal of Conscience Annual Awards Dinner Honoring Jean Chrétien and Carleton S. Fiorina

1 Oct 2002 Address by Carly Fiorina Chairman and CEO of Hewlett-Packard Company - receipt of the Appeal of Conscience Award Appeal of Conscience Foundation Annual Awards Dinner

1 Oct 2002 Address by Prime Minister Jean Chrétien 2002 Appeal of Conscience Annual Award Dinner

== Controversy ==
The 2013 'World Statesman of the Year' was highly controversial since Indonesian President Susilo Bambang Yudhoyono has failed to protect religious minorities in the world's largest Muslim-majority country, and overseen what has been determined to be a genocide in West Papua Instead of promoting tolerance, President Yudhoyono has overseen a sharp increase in acts of intolerance to Ahmadiyah Muslims, Shi'ite Muslims, and Christians, leading to widespread public criticism from human rights activists, academics, and persecuted minority groups.

Petitions to Rabbi Schneier to withdraw the award garnered over 10,000 signatures from around the globe. Instead of heeding the concerns of persecuted minorities, Rabbi Schneier granted the award and helped President Yudhoyono to, "whitewash his legacy." Human rights activists eventually concluded that the Appeal of Conscience Foundation was little more than a vehicle for publicity-seeking and influence-peddling.

== Listing of The Appeal of Conscience Actions ==
- 29 April 2019 - Cooperation Agreement signed between the Appeal of Conscience Foundation and the Muslim World League to unite efforts to protect religious sites around the world.
- 9 November 2005 - Declaration of the Peace and Tolerance II Conference: Dialogue and Understanding in Southeast Europe, the Caucasus and Central Asia
- 28 July 2005 - Call for Action on Darfur
- 1 December 2000 - A Call to Stop Desecration of Holy Sites by a delegation to the United Nations
- 18 March 1999 - Kosovo Peace and Tolerance Vienna Declaration (With former U.S. Congress member Joe DioGuardi of the Albanian American Civic League)
- 21 May 1998 - Joint Declaration of the Delegation of Religious Leaders from Bosnia and Herzegovina and the Appeal of Conscience Foundation
- 30 March 1995 - The Vienna Declaration Signed at the Appeal of Conscience Conflict Resolution Conference
- 9 February 1994 - Bosphorus Declaration was signed at the Appeal of Conscience Conference on Peace and Tolerance
- 26 November 1992 – The Bern Declaration for Peace in Bosnia and Herzegovina
