= Evelyn Denington, Baroness Denington =

British politician

The Right Honourable The Baroness Denington DBE

Personal details
- Born: Evelyn Joyce Bursill; 9 August 1907 Woolwich, London, England
- Died: 22 August 1998 (aged 91) Brighton, Sussex, England
- Party: Labour
- Spouse: Cecil Dallas Denington (1935-her death)
- Occupation: Politician
- Profession: Teacher

Evelyn Joyce Denington, Baroness Denington, DBE (née Bursill; 9 August 1907 – 22 August 1998) was a British politician. She served as chair of the Stevenage Development Corporation from 1966–80 and chair of the Greater London Council from 1975–77.

== Early life and career ==
Denington was born Evelyn Joyce Bursill on 9 August 1907 to Philip Charles Bursill and Edith Rowena Montford. She was educated at Blackheath High School, Bedford College and Birkbeck College, where she attended evening classes. In 1927, she became an editorial assistant at Architecture and Building News, leaving in 1931 to retrain as a teacher. Denington became secretary to the National Association of Labour Teachers (1938–47), and taught in London junior schools until 1950.

== Marriage ==
She married Cecil Dallas Denington, a stockbroker's clerk but later a schoolteacher, in 1935.

== Politics ==
She, and her husband, were elected to St Pancras Borough Council in 1945, serving until 1959. She was also elected to the London County Council in 1946, representing St Pancras North, and continued to serve on its successor, the Greater London Council representing Camden, then Islington and finally Islington Central. In 1964, Denington became chair of the London Housing Committee and was the landlady of 120,000 London homes, expanding to sites anywhere between Swindon and King's Lynn.

She served as a member of the Stevenage Development Corporation Board (Stevenage became a new town following the New Towns Act 1946) from 1950 and was appointed as its chair in 1966 by Lewis Silkin, then Minister for Town and Country Planning, where she served until the Corporation was dissolved in 1980. She became Commander of the Order of the British Empire in 1966.

During her time as a member of the Corporation, Stevenage town centre became Britain's first pedestrianized town centre. The local art gallery was named after her, and she became an honorary fellow of the Royal Institute of British Architects and an honorary member of the Royal Town Planning Institute.

Denington became a member of London County Council's new and expanding towns committee, and served as chair of the design subcommittee. Following the creation of the Greater London Council, she became chair of the housing committee with responsibility for around 200,000 homes. During opposition (1967–1973), she became Labour's deputy leader on the Council, before serving as chair of the transport committee from 1973 to 1975, establishing free buses for pensioners.

In 1974, she was promoted to Dame Commander of the Order of the British Empire, and from 1975–76, she became chair of the Greater London Council. She retired from the Greater London Council in 1977 and was created a life peer as Baroness Denington, of Stevenage in the County of Hertfordshire, on 10 July 1978.

== Death and legacy ==
She and her husband retired to Hove and they had no children. She died of heart failure on 22 August 1998 in Brighton, aged 91. Evelyn Denington Road in Newham, London and Evelyn Denington Court in Islington, London were both named in her honour.

Civic offices
| Preceded by David Pitt | Chairman of the Greater London Council; 1975–1976 | Succeeded by Thomas Ponsonby |
