= David Pitt, Baron Pitt of Hampstead =

British Labour Party politician {1913–1994)

The Right Honourable The Lord Pitt
- Born: David Thomas Pitt; 3 October 1913; St. David's Parish, Grenada
- Died: 18 December 1994 (aged 81); London, England
- Education: University of Edinburgh
- Occupations: Medical practitioner, politician and activist
- Spouse: Dorothy (née Alleyne) Lady Pitt (m. 1943)
- Children: 1 son, 2 daughters

David Thomas Pitt, Baron Pitt of Hampstead (3 October 1913 – 18 December 1994) was a British Labour Party politician, general practitioner and political activist. Born in Grenada in the Caribbean, he was the second peer of African descent to sit in the House of Lords, being granted a life peerage in 1975, and was the longest-serving black Parliamentarian.

== Early life and career ==
Born in St. David's Parish, Grenada, Pitt attended St. David's Roman Catholic School and then the Grenada Boys' Secondary School, from where he won the Island Scholarship in 1932 to have further education abroad. He studied medicine at the University of Edinburgh, where he was an active member of Edinburgh University Socialist Society. He graduated with honours in 1938. He was always concerned about broader social issues. He witnessed the poverty of the working classes in the slums of Edinburgh and saw similarities to the rural poverty he witnessed as a child. Nicholas Rea, in the British Medical Journal, said of Pitt: "it was in the slums of Edinburgh as much as in the Caribbean that he became convinced of the links between poverty, disadvantage, and ill health". In 1936, he joined the Labour movement.

He returned to the Caribbean to begin his medical career, his first job being as district medical officer in Saint Vincent, followed two years later by a position in Trinidad as house physician at San Fernando Hospital. Continuing his passion for social justice alongside his medical career, and he established his own general practice in San Fernando in 1941 and that year was elected to the San Fernando Borough Council. In 1943, he became a founding member and leader of the West Indian National Party (WINP) – a socialist party whose main aim was to deliver political autonomy across the Caribbean. Under Pitt, the party demanded self-government for Trinidad and Tobago, constitutional reform and the nationalisation of commodities industries such as oil and sugar.

After decades of campaigning, the people of Trinidad and Tobago were granted universal adult suffrage by the British Parliament in 1945. The first elections took place in 1946. WINP and others formed the United Front with Pitt as one of the candidates. He was not successful, but he continued his activism and in 1947 led a group of WINP members to Britain to lobby the Attlee government for Commonwealth status for a Federation of the West Indies.

In 1947, Pitt again travelled to Britain and settled in London. He opened a medical practice in the Euston area of London and treated both white and black patients.

== Political career in Britain ==
In the 1959 general election, he was the first person of African descent to be a parliamentary candidate, standing as the Labour Party candidate for the north London constituency of Hampstead. From the mid-1950s, Pitt had become involved in local politics. After delivering a speech at the 1957 Labour Party Conference, he was asked by Roy Shaw, the then treasurer of Tribune, if he would stand for Parliament. The issues of race were injected into the campaign, and Pitt was defeated by the Conservative Party candidate, Henry Brooke. During the course of the campaign, Pitt received racist death threats, as did his family; however, despite the racist abuse, he refused to withdraw from the contest. He subsequently founded the Campaign Against Racial Discrimination.

Two years later, in 1961, he was elected to the London County Council (LCC) as member for Stoke Newington and Hackney North. He was elected to the successor of the LCC, the Greater London Council (GLC), representing Hackney until 1973 and then Hackney North and Stoke Newington until 1977. He was deputy chair of the GLC from 1969 to 1970, and in 1974 he was the first black person to become chair of the GLC.

Pitt's second attempt to be elected as an MP came in 1970, when he was the Labour Party candidate for Clapham. Although this had been seen as a safe seat for Labour, the Conservative William Shelton was elected. Racism was a factor in this election defeat as well, with an anonymous leaflet circulated during the campaign featuring the slogan: "If you desire a coloured for your neighbour vote Labour. If you are already burdoned [sic] with one vote Tory."

In 1975, the Prime Minister, Harold Wilson, recommended Pitt's appointment to the House of Lords as a life peer, and he was created Baron Pitt of Hampstead, of Hampstead in Greater London and of Hampstead in Grenada on 3 February 1975, becoming thus the second peer of African-Caribbean heritage (after Lord Constantine). As a member of the House of Lords, he played a leading role in campaigning for the Race Relations Act 1976. He was outspoken on issues such as immigration policy, and in a debate on 24 June 1976 he noted, in part:

"...it is a myth, that the fewer the numbers [of black immigrants] the better the quality of race relations. That is a myth, and it is a myth that has inspired the 1962 Commonwealth Immigrants Act, the Immigration White Paper of August 1965 and the Immigration Acts of 1968 and 1971. It is designed to placate the racialists, but it is a fallacy; for to the racialist or the anti-semite the only acceptable number is nought. The proof of what I am saying can be seen in the fact that the National Front admit that their major support lies in areas near to but not in areas of high coloured concentration. The reason for that is that ignorance leads to fear. Thus, when a person fears that his next door neighbour will in future be coloured he wants immigration stopped. However, you will find that the least hostility to coloured people is found among the whites who live next to, shop with, travel with, work with and play with coloured persons."

Pitt was a leader in the movement against apartheid in South Africa, with protest meetings being organised from the basement of his surgery in North Gower Street, London.

He was described as a black radical for suggesting that more ethnic minorities should apply to become police officers; this, ironically, angered many in the black community who felt that the police were institutionally racist. Pitt is quoted as saying: "Some black people regard me as an Uncle Tom, while some whites regard me as a Black Power revolutionary. So I imagine I got it about right."

In 1983, to mark his 70th birthday, The Lord Pitt Foundation was established.

From 1985 to 1986, Pitt was the president of the British Medical Association, which he described as his most valued honour.

== Personal life ==
In 1943, Pitt married Dorothy Elaine Alleyne, whom he met in Trinidad, and they had three children: a son, Bruce, and two daughters, Phyllis and Amanda. He died in London, aged 81, on 18 December 1994.

== Recognition and legacy ==
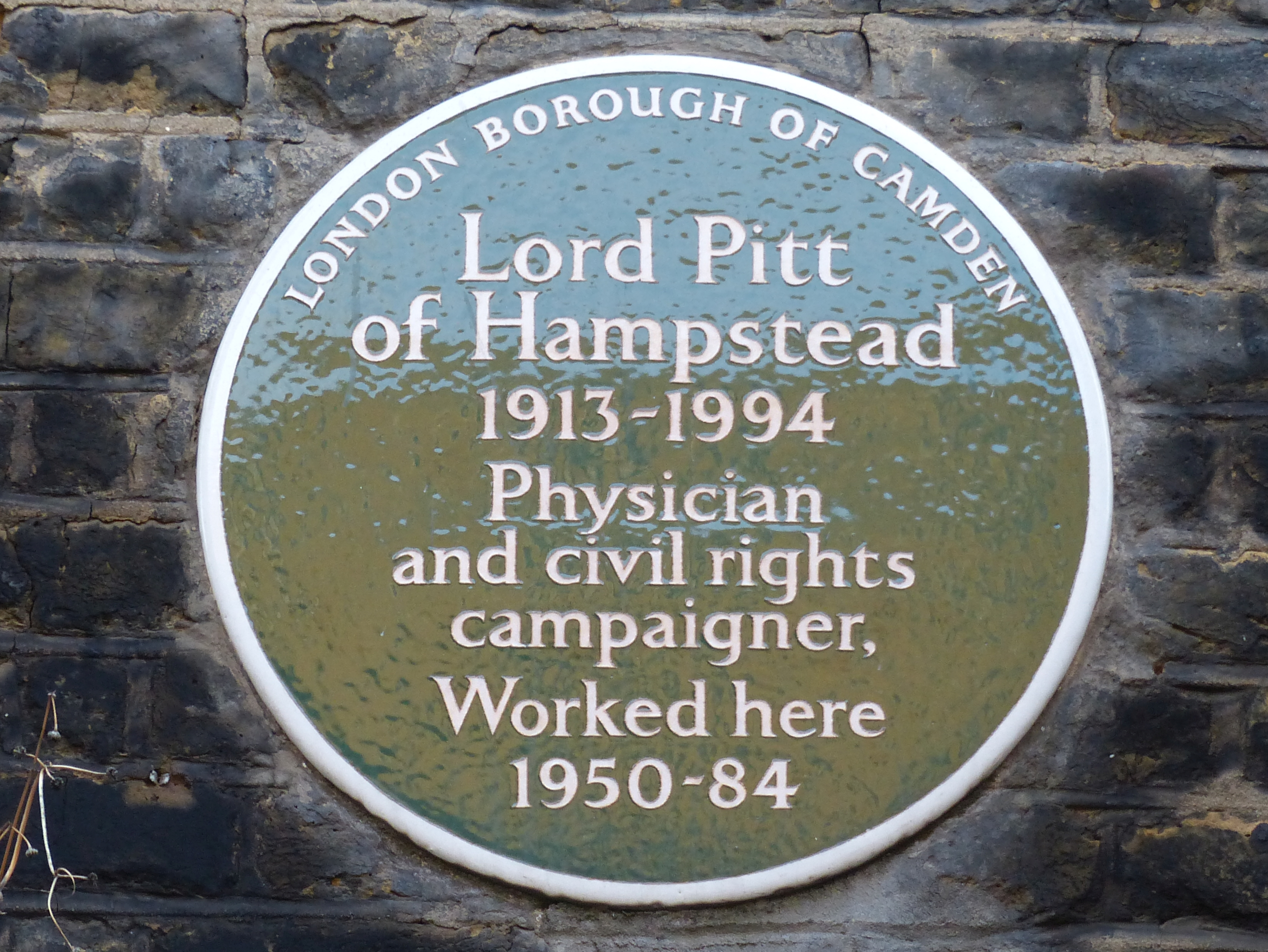

In 2004, he was named as one of "100 Great Black Britons", as part of Black History Month.

In 2009, the annual "Lord David Pitt Memorial Lecture" at City Hall in London was initiated by Jennette Arnold in collaboration with the British Caribbean Association.

A plaque at 200 North Gower Street in Camden, London, commemorates the building where Pitt worked as a doctor from 1950 to 1984.

Civic offices
Preceded by Arthur Wicks	Chairman of the Greater London Council; 1974–1975	Succeeded by Evelyn Denington
