= Islington (electoral division) =

Electoral division in Greater London, 1965–1973

- Former electoral division for the Greater London Council
- Islington electoral division boundaries
- District: London Borough of Islington
- Population: 235,990 (1969 estimate)
- Electorate: 172,917 (1964); 159,455 (1967); 150,721 (1970)
- Area: 3,678.6 acres (14.887 km^{2})

Former electoral division
- Created: 1965
- Abolished: 1973
- Member(s): 3
- Replaced by: Islington Central, Islington North and Islington South and Finsbury

Islington was an electoral division for the purposes of elections to the Greater London Council. The constituency elected three councillors for a three-year term in 1964, 1967 and 1970.

== History ==
It was planned to use the same boundaries as the Westminster Parliament constituencies for election of councillors to the Greater London Council (GLC), as had been the practice for elections to the predecessor London County Council, but those that existed in 1965 crossed the Greater London boundary. Until new constituencies could be settled, the 32 London boroughs were used as electoral areas which therefore created a constituency called Islington.

The electoral division was replaced from 1973 by the single-member electoral divisions of Islington Central, Islington North and Islington South and Finsbury.

== Elections ==
The Islington constituency was used for the Greater London Council elections in 1964, 1967 and 1970. Three councillors were elected at each election using first-past-the-post voting.

=== 1964 election ===
The first election was held on 9 April 1964, a year before the council came into its powers. The electorate was 172,917 and three Labour Party councillors were elected. With 45,798 people voting, the turnout was 26.5%. The councillors were elected for a three-year term.

1964 Greater London Council election: Islington
Party	Candidate	Votes	%	±%
Labour	Edwin Bayliss	31,077		
Labour	Irene Chaplin	30,165		
Labour	Florence Evelyne Cayford	30,107		
Conservative	R. A. Baker	8,152		
Conservative	P. E. Postgate	7,811		
Conservative	A. Hardy	7,380		
New Liberal	F. C. Barrett	2,922		
Communist	J. F. Moss	2,309		
New Liberal	F. G. S. White	2,292		
Liberal	S. W. Applin	2,290		
New Liberal	A. E. Lomas	2,207		
Liberal	C. Simpson	1,956		
Liberal	A. F. Cook	1,675		
Independent	D. H. L. Chenappa	659		
Turnout				
Labour win (new seat)				
Labour win (new seat)				
Labour win (new seat)				

=== 1967 election ===
The second election was held on 13 April 1967. The electorate was 159,455 and three Labour Party councillors were elected. With 37,100 people voting, the turnout was 23.3%. The councillors were elected for a three-year term.

1967 Greater London Council election: Islington
Party	Candidate	Votes	%	±%
Labour	Evelyn Joyce Denington	17,037		
Labour	Hazel Corinne Rose	16,829		
Labour	Arthur Ernest Wicks	16,638		
Conservative	D. G. Baker	14,984		
Conservative	E. H. Archer	14,972		
Conservative	P. Carr	14,195		
Liberal	W. G. Webster	1,805		
Liberal	J. W. Tarling	1,764		
Liberal	A. W. Mildren	1,742		
Communist	M. Betteridge	1,642		
Islington Tenants & Ratepayers	F. C. Barrett	1,510		
Islington Tenants & Ratepayers	H. W. Bray	1,156		
Islington Tenants & Ratepayers	E. Gray	1,067		
Independent	J. Davies	664		
Turnout				
Labour hold		Swing		
Labour hold		Swing		
Labour hold		Swing		

=== 1970 election ===
The third election was held on 9 April 1970. The electorate was 150,721 and three Labour Party councillors were elected. With 37,107 people voting, the turnout was 24.6%. The councillors were elected for a three-year term.

1970 Greater London Council election: Islington
Party	Candidate	Votes	%	±%
Labour	Louis Wolfgang Bondy	22,150		
Labour	Evelyn Joyce Denington	22,080		
Labour	Arthur Ernest Wicks	21,239		
Conservative	B. A. Devonald-Lewis	12,228		
Conservative	Ann P. Morris	12,126		
Conservative	J. Szeremey	11,988		
Communist	M. Betteridge	1,591		
Liberal	M. A. Rooke	642		
Liberal	A. W. Mildren	580		
Liberal	J. W. Shields	544		
Homes before Roads	D. J. Wager	526		
New Liberal	A. E. Lomas	515		
Homes before Roads	S. P. C. Plowden	507		
New Liberal	A. N. Richardson	413		
Homes before Roads	C. C. Willbourne	401		
New Liberal	R. Girolami	387		
Union Movement	R. A. Taylor	190		
Turnout				
Labour hold		Swing		
Labour hold		Swing		
Labour hold		Swing		
