= Hackney (electoral division) =

Electoral division in Greater London, 1965–1973

- Former electoral division for the Greater London Council
- Hackney electoral division boundaries
- District: London Borough of Hackney
- Population: 238,530 (1969 estimate)
- Electorate: 171,223 (1964); 163,738 (1967); 161,934 (1970)
- Major settlements: Hackney, Shoreditch, Stoke Newington
- Area: 4,814.8 acres (19.485 km^{2})

Former electoral division
- Created: 1965
- Abolished: 1973
- Member(s): 3
- Replaced by: Hackney Central, Hackney North and Stoke Newington and Hackney South and Shoreditch

Hackney was an electoral division for the purposes of elections to the Greater London Council. The constituency elected three councillors for a three-year term in 1964, 1967 and 1970.

== History ==
It was planned to use the same boundaries as the Westminster Parliament constituencies for election of councillors to the Greater London Council (GLC), as had been the practice for elections to the predecessor London County Council, but those that existed in 1965 crossed the Greater London boundary. Until new constituencies could be settled, the 32 London boroughs were used as electoral areas which therefore created a constituency called Hackney.

The electoral division was replaced from 1973 by the single-member electoral divisions of Hackney Central, Hackney North and Stoke Newington and Hackney South and Shoreditch.

== Elections ==
The Hackney constituency was used for the Greater London Council elections in 1964, 1967 and 1970. Three councillors were elected at each election using first-past-the-post voting.

=== 1964 election ===
The first election was held on 9 April 1964, a year before the council came into its powers. The electorate was 171,223 and three Labour Party councillors were elected. With 38,396 people voting, the turnout was 22.4%. The councillors were elected for a three-year term.

1964 Greater London Council election: Hackney
Party	Candidate	Votes	%	±%
Labour	Ellis Simon Hillman	24,793		
Labour	David Thomas Pitt	24,281		
Labour	Arthur Ernest Wicks	24,037		
Conservative	O. S. Henriques	6,561		
Conservative	W. J. Hawkins	6,265		
Conservative	A. M. White	6,260		
Liberal	R. B. James	3,953		
Liberal	T. Keen	3,904		
Liberal	T. D. Gates	3,641		
Communist	M. Goldman	2,807		
Turnout				
Labour win (new seat)				
Labour win (new seat)				
Labour win (new seat)				

=== 1967 election ===
The second election was held on 13 April 1967. The electorate was 163,738 and three Labour Party councillors were elected. With 34,802 people voting, the turnout was 21.3%. The councillors were elected for a three-year term.

1967 Greater London Council election: Hackney
Party	Candidate	Votes	%	±%
Labour	Ellis Simon Hillman	17,182		
Labour	David Thomas Pitt	16,080		
Labour	Irene Chaplin	15,623		
Conservative	O. S. Henriques	11,773		
Conservative	H. J. Jackson	11,359		
Conservative	K. S. Lightwood	10,643		
Liberal	J. Gavin	3,636		
Liberal	L. W. Eaks	3,375		
Liberal	H. J. Newbrook	3,177		
Communist	M. Goldman	2,858		
Turnout				
Labour hold		Swing		
Labour hold		Swing		
Labour hold		Swing		

=== 1970 election ===
The third election was held on 9 April 1970. The electorate was 161,934 and three Labour Party councillors were elected. With 39,300 people voting, the turnout was 24.3%. The councillors were elected for a three-year term.

1970 Greater London Council election: Hackney
Party	Candidate	Votes	%	±%
Labour	David Thomas Pitt	24,236		
Labour	Ellis Simon Hillman	24,208		
Labour	Irene Chaplin	24,192		
Conservative	R. P. Halford	9,726		
Conservative	E. Laws	9,556		
Conservative	B. M. Haigh	9,522		
Communist	M. Goldman	1,625		
Liberal	S. Leff	1,046		
Liberal	W. G. Wintle	1,031		
Liberal	T. J. Needham	931		
Homes before Roads	M. L. Crowther	565		
Homes before Roads	J. Williams	431		
Homes before Roads	P. A. Ayrton	402		
Union Movement	M. F. Moloney	280		
Turnout				
Labour hold		Swing		
Labour hold		Swing		
Labour hold		Swing		
