= Edinburgh University Socialist Society =

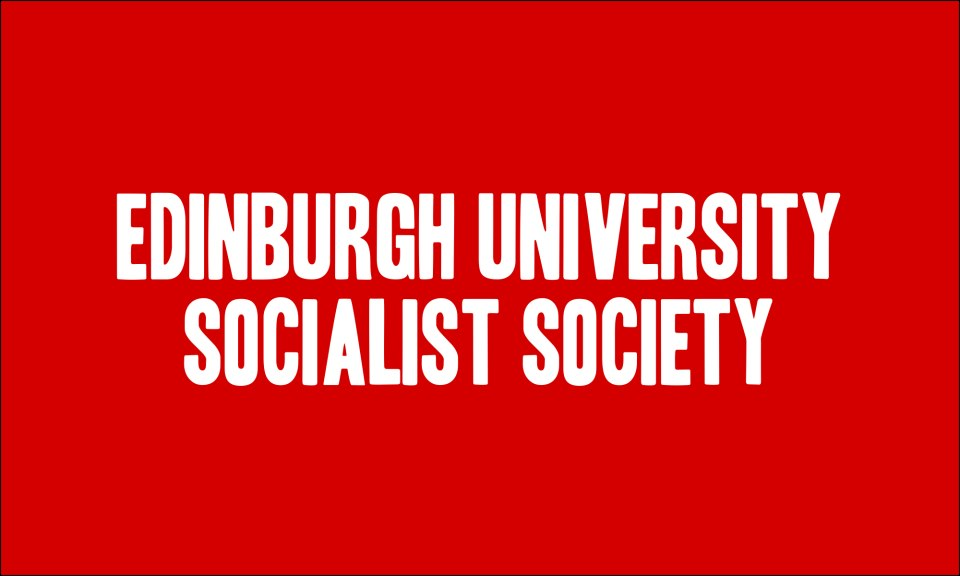
- Abbreviation: E.U.S.S.
- Formation: 19 March 1884; 142 years ago
- Purpose: Education, discussion, debate, political agitation, advocacy
- Affiliations: Edinburgh University Students' Association
- Website: edunisocialists.wordpress.com
- Formerly called: Edinburgh University Reform Society

Edinburgh University Socialist Society is a society at the University of Edinburgh in Scotland which advocates a "more just and equal society, based on democratic control of the economy".

The Society has existed in various forms since it was initially founded in 1884, stating in its manifesto: "Utopia now: we can bring it about. The power is ours if we have the will". One of the key founders of the society was Léo Meillet, who had been active in the Paris Commune as a member of the "Committee for Public Safety". It is believed to have been Britain's first university socialist society.

The Society played a key role in the early development of the socialist movement in Scotland, including hosting the first "indoor preaching of Modern Socialism" in Edinburgh on 19 March 1884, with William Morris as the main speaker. The talk was titled "Useful Labour versus Useless Toil", The Scotsman reported a "good attendance, a considerable proportion of those present being ladies". Later that year the society also hosted a lecture by the influential positivist, Edward Spencer Beesly.

In 1885, following the realisation of the stigma associated with 'socialism', the Society briefly changed its name to Edinburgh University Reform Society.

Russian Nobel Prize–winning physicist and revolutionary Igor Tamm was active in the society as a student in 1913.

Experimental zoologist and critic of eugenics, Lancelot Hogben played an active role in the Society in the early 1920s.

Poet J. K. Annand was the Society's Secretary during his time at the university in the late 1920s.

In the 1930s members included David Pitt, who went on to become a civil rights activist and Britain's longest serving black parliamentarian; Robert McIntyre, who went on to be Leader and then President of the Scottish National Party; and Jessie Kocmanová, who went on to become a leading scholar on William Morris.

In 1949 the society host a performance by singer, actor and civil rights activist Paul Robeson. Later that year Max Born (pioneer of quantum physics and later winner of the Nobel Prize in Physics) used a meeting of the society to express his opinions on atomic weapons and foreign policy.
