= Hackney North and Stoke Newington (electoral division) =

Electoral division in Greater London, 1973–1986

- Former electoral division for the Greater London Council
- District: Hackney
- Electorate: 53,769 (1973); 48,841 (1977); 46,321 (1981)
- Major settlements: Stoke Newington
- Area: 596 hectares (5.96 km^{2})

Former electoral division
- Created: 1973
- Abolished: 1986
- Member: 1
- Created from: Hackney

Hackney North and Stoke Newington was an electoral division for the purposes of elections to the Greater London Council. The constituency elected one councillor for a four-year term in 1973, 1977 and 1981, with the final term extended for an extra year ahead of the abolition of the Greater London Council.

== History ==
It was planned to use the same boundaries as the Westminster Parliament constituencies for election of councillors to the Greater London Council (GLC), as had been the practice for elections to the predecessor London County Council, but those that existed in 1965 crossed the Greater London boundary. Until new constituencies could be settled, the 32 London boroughs were used as electoral areas. The London Borough of Hackney formed the Hackney electoral division. This was used for the Greater London Council elections in 1964, 1967 and 1970.

The new constituencies were settled following the Second Periodic Review of Westminster constituencies and the new electoral division matched the boundaries of the Hackney North and Stoke Newington parliamentary constituency.

The area was in a long-term period of population decline that was yet to reverse. The electorate reduced from 53,769 in 1973 to 46,321 in 1981. It covered an area of 596 hectares (5.96 km^{2}).

== Elections ==
The Hackney North and Stoke Newington constituency was used for the Greater London Council elections in 1973, 1977 and 1981. One councillor was elected at each election using first-past-the-post voting. Ken Livingstone, who was elected from the constituency in 1977, was Leader of the Greater London Council from 1981 to 1986. He was previously elected to represent Norwood in 1973 and was later elected to represent Paddington in 1981.

=== 1973 election ===
The fourth election to the GLC (and first using revised boundaries) was held on 12 April 1973. The electorate was 53,769 and one Labour Party councillor was elected. The turnout was 18.5%. The councillor was elected for a three-year term. This was extended for an extra year in 1976 when the electoral cycle was switched to four-yearly.

1973 Greater London Council election: Hackney North and Stoke Newington
Party	Candidate	Votes	%	±%
Labour	David Thomas Pitt	6,529	65.79	
Conservative	L. R. House	2,524	25.43	
Communist	Monty Goldman	621	6.26	
Socialist (GB)	J. Carter	250	2.52	
Turnout				
Labour win (new seat)				

=== 1977 election ===
The fifth election to the GLC (and second using revised boundaries) was held on 5 May 1977. The electorate was 48,841 and one Labour Party councillor was elected. The turnout was 36.6%. The councillor was elected for a four-year term.

1977 Greater London Council election: Hackney North and Stoke Newington
Party	Candidate	Votes	%	±%
Labour	Ken Livingstone	9,548	53.57	
Conservative	L. R. House	5,627	31.57	
National Front	S. May	1,235	6.93	
Liberal	M. Owen	909	5.10	
Communist	Monty Goldman	504	2.83	
Turnout				
Labour hold		Swing		

=== 1981 election ===
The sixth and final election to the GLC (and third using revised boundaries) was held on 7 May 1981. The electorate was 46,321 and one Labour and Co-operative Party councillor was elected. The turnout was 37.6%. The councillor was elected for a four-year term, extended by an extra year by the Local Government (Interim Provisions) Act 1984, ahead of the abolition of the council.

1981 Greater London Council election: Hackney North and Stoke Newington
Party	Candidate	Votes	%	±%
Labour Co-op	Gerald Ross	10,045	58.05	
Conservative	Leslie R. House	3,592	20.76	
Liberal and Social Democrat	Maurice S. Owen	2,243	12.96	
Communist	Monty Goldman	444	2.57	
Enoch Powell is Right	Sylvia May	341	1.97	
National Front	Ralph Ashton	192	1.11	
East London Workers Against Racism	Joan Lalmont	187	1.08	
Workers Revolutionary	William P. Rogers	159	0.92	
Independent	Goksel Hassan	101	0.58	
Turnout				
Labour hold		Swing		
