= Hackney Central (electoral division) =

Electoral division in Greater London, 1973–1986

- Former electoral division for the Greater London Council
- District: Hackney
- Electorate: 49,615 (1973); 47,904 (1977); 46,683 (1981)
- Area: 774 hectares (7.74 km^{2})

Former electoral division
- Created: 1973
- Abolished: 1986
- Member: 1
- Created from: Hackney

Hackney Central was an electoral division for the purposes of elections to the Greater London Council. The constituency elected one councillor for a four-year term in 1973, 1977 and 1981, with the final term extended for an extra year ahead of the abolition of the Greater London Council.

== History ==
It was planned to use the same boundaries as the Westminster Parliament constituencies for election of councillors to the Greater London Council (GLC), as had been the practice for elections to the predecessor London County Council, but those that existed in 1965 crossed the Greater London boundary. Until new constituencies could be settled, the 32 London boroughs were used as electoral areas. The London Borough of Hackney formed the Hackney electoral division. This was used for the Greater London Council elections in 1964, 1967 and 1970.

The new constituencies were settled following the Second Periodic Review of Westminster constituencies and the new electoral division matched the boundaries of the Hackney Central parliamentary constituency.

The area was in a long-term period of population decline that was yet to reverse. The electorate reduced from 49,615 in 1973 to 46,683 in 1981. It covered an area of 774 hectares (7.74 km^{2}).

== Elections ==
The Hackney Central constituency was used for the Greater London Council elections in 1973, 1977 and 1981. One councillor was elected at each election using first-past-the-post voting.

=== 1973 election ===
The fourth election to the GLC (and first using revised boundaries) was held on 12 April 1973. The electorate was 49,615 and one Labour Party councillor was elected. The turnout was 22.8%. The councillor was elected for a three-year term. This was extended for an extra year in 1976 when the electoral cycle was switched to four-yearly.

1973 Greater London Council election: Hackney Central
Party	Candidate	Votes	%	±%
Labour	Ellis S. Hillman	9,265	81.98	
Conservative	S. J. Sorrell	1,770	15.66	
Independent	O. Hales	266	2.35	
Turnout				
Labour win (new seat)				

=== 1977 election ===
The fifth election to the GLC (and second using revised boundaries) was held on 5 May 1977. The electorate was 47,904 and one Labour Party councillor was elected. The turnout was 33.0%. The councillor was elected for a four-year term.

1977 Greater London Council election: Hackney Central
Party	Candidate	Votes	%	±%
Labour	Ellis S. Hillman	8,076	51.19	
Conservative	K. S. Lightwood	4,366	27.67	
National Front	R. May	2,388	15.14	
Liberal	P. C. Asbury-Smith	644	4.08	
Communist	D. McNeil	303	1.92	
Turnout				
Labour hold		Swing		

=== 1981 election ===
The sixth and final election to the GLC (and third using revised boundaries) was held on 7 May 1981. The electorate was 46,683 and one Labour Party councillor was elected. The turnout was 35.3%. The councillor was elected for a four-year term, extended by an extra year by the Local Government (Interim Provisions) Act 1984, ahead of the abolition of the council.

1981 Greater London Council election: Hackney Central
Party	Candidate	Votes	%	±%
Labour	J. A. Carr	11,402	70.01	
Conservative	J. C. Murphy	2,684	16.48	
Communist	L. Jones	611	3.75	
National Front	J. D. Field	564	3.46	
Independent	A. Wodhams	521	3.20	
Enoch Powell is Right	R. May	504	3.09	
Turnout				
Labour hold		Swing		
