= Louis Bondy =

Louis Wolfgang Bondy (1910–1993) was a German-born British antiquarian bookseller, author and local politician in the London Borough of Camden.

He was born in Berlin, Germany in 1910.

From 1937 he worked at the Jewish Central Information Office in Amsterdam and facilitated its move to London after November pogrom of 1938.

He ran a bookshop at 16 Little Russell Street, which specialised in miniature books. He wrote a monograph on the subject in 1981.

He was elected as a Labour Party councillor on the London County Council in 1958, representing Holborn and St Pancras South until 1965. He was elected as a councillor on the successor Greater London Council, representing Camden from 1964 to 1967, then Islington from 1970 to 1973 and then Islington North from 1973 to 1981.

He died on 10 June 1993.

== Bibliography ==
- Racketeers of Hatred: Julius Streicher and the Jew-baiters' International. London: Newman Wolsey, 1946
- Miniature Books: Their History from the Beginnings to the Present Day. London: Sheppard Press, 1981
