= Arthur Schneier =

Austrian-American rabbi (born 1930)

Rabbi Arthur Schneier
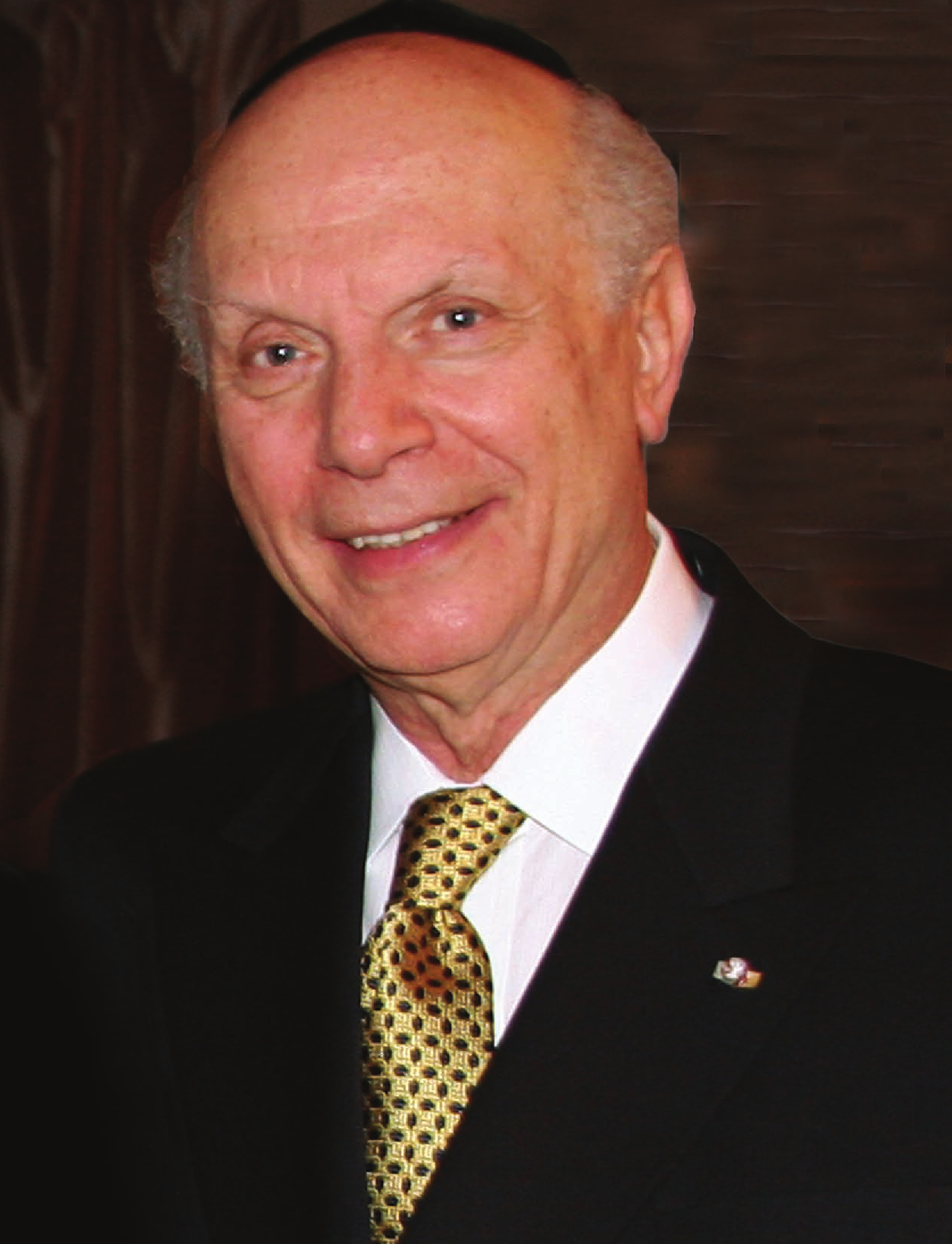

Personal life
- Born: March 20, 1930 (age 96) Vienna, Austria
- Spouse: Elisabeth Nordmann Schneier
- Education: Yeshiva University

Religious life
- Religion: Judaism

Jewish leader
- Position: Senior Rabbi
- Synagogue: Park East
- Organization: Appeal of Conscience Foundation

Arthur Schneier (born March 20, 1930) is an Austrian American rabbi and human rights activist. Rabbi Schneier has served for over 50 years as the Senior Rabbi of New York City’s Park East Synagogue. While being honored with the Presidential Citizens Medal from President Bill Clinton in 2001, Rabbi Schneier was described as “a Holocaust survivor who has devoted a lifetime to overcoming forces of hatred and intolerance and set an inspiring example of spiritual leadership by encouraging interfaith dialog and intercultural understanding, as well as promoting the cause of religious freedom around the world.” Schneier is among the oldest pulpit rabbis in the United States.

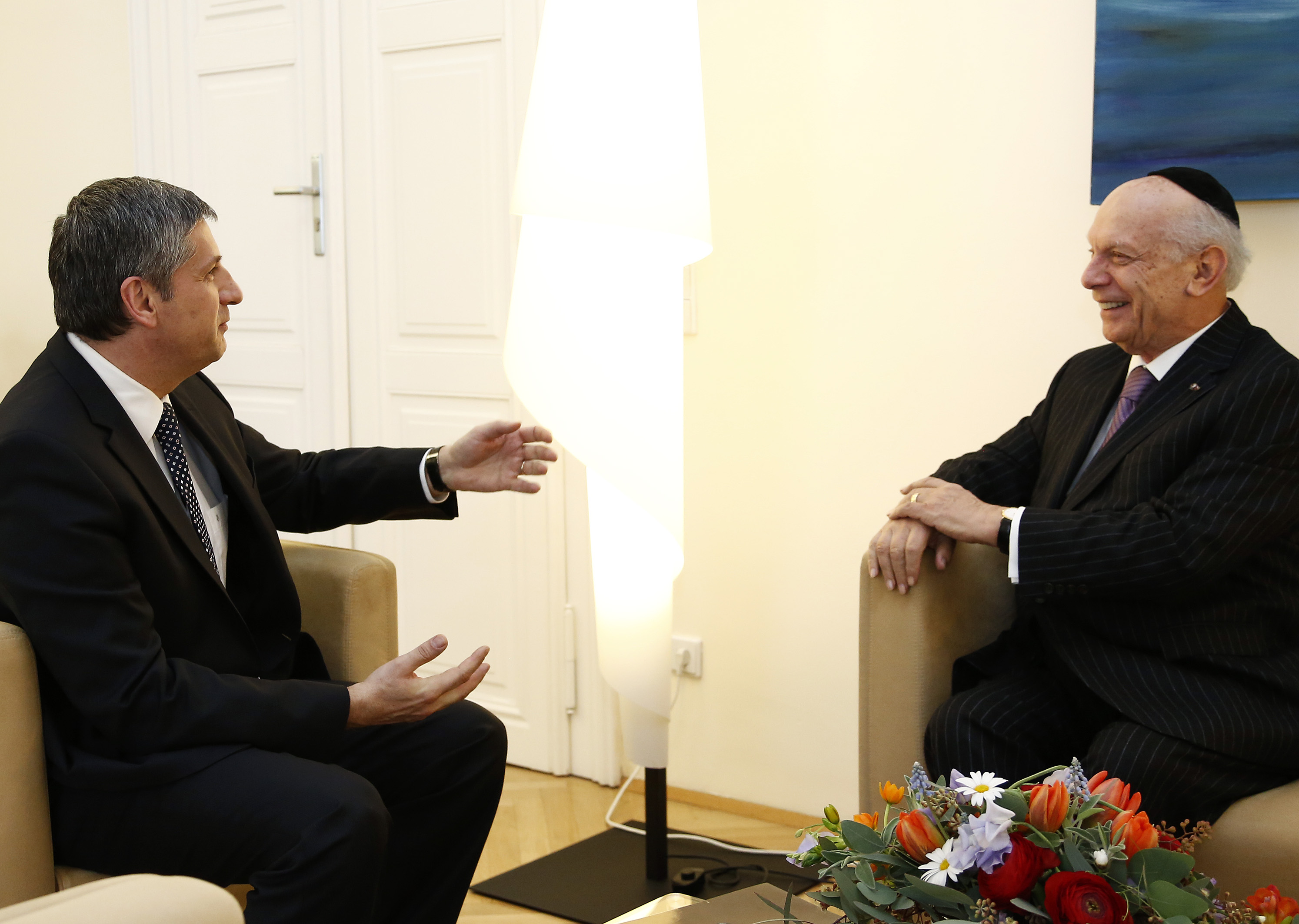
Rabbi Schneier with Austrian Minister of Finance Michael Spindelegger

== Education ==
Rabbi Schneier graduated with a B.A. from Yeshiva University in 1951, was awarded an M.A. from New York University in 1953 and received his rabbinical ordination from Yeshiva University in 1955. Schneier is also the recipient of 11 honorary doctorates from American and European universities.

== Career ==
In 1962, Rabbi Schneier became the senior rabbi at Park East Synagogue in New York City. During his service there, he has hosted several world religious and political leaders including Pope Benedict XVI—the first-ever papal visit to an American synagogue—and two Secretaries General of the United Nations. Schneier has met with Popes John Paul II, Francis, and Ecumenical Patriarch Bartholomew I to promote and facilitate interfaith dialogue. In 2012, the New York Senate passed a resolution in celebration of Rabbi Schneier's 50 years of service at Park East Synagogue. He is also the Founder and Dean of Park East Day School, a Modern Orthodox Jewish day school.

In 1965 he founded the Appeal of Conscience Foundation as an “interfaith coalition of business and religious leaders” dedicated to promoting “peace, tolerance and ethnic conflict resolution.”

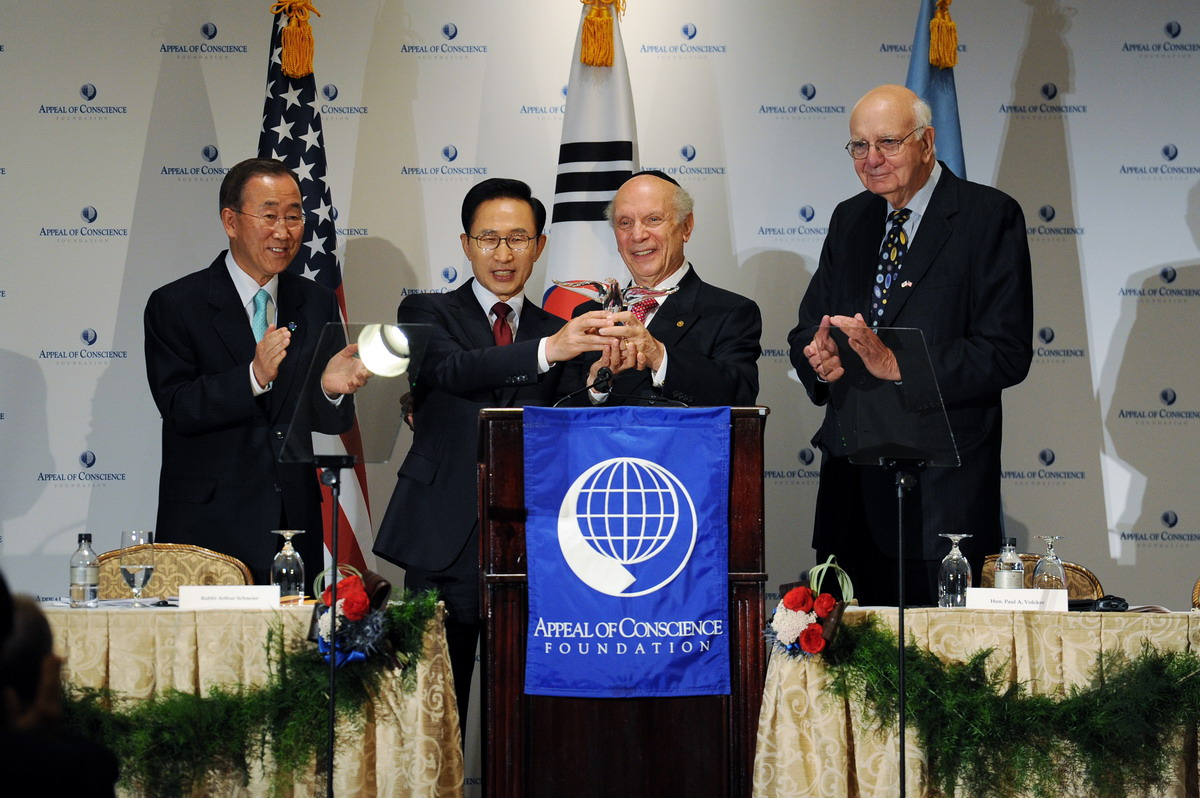
Rabbi Schneier presents the Global Leadership Award to South Korean President Lee Myung-bak

Throughout his career, Rabbi Schneier has actively advanced the cause of peace and tolerance. He is known for his efforts to rebuild Jewish and religious life in Russia after the collapse of the USSR and was instrumental in the return of the Moscow Synagogue to the Russian Jewish community.

Rabbi Schneier has led 68 interfaith missions in China, Russia, Eastern Europe and Latin America. In 1992, he convened the Religious Summit on the Former Yugoslavia in Switzerland, and in 1995, he convened the Conflict Resolution Conference in Vienna to mobilize world religious leaders to stop the conflict in the Balkans. For more than 20 years, Rabbi Schneier worked closely with Grand Mufti Ceric of Bosnia and Herzegovina. In 1992, they gathered together some of the top religious leaders from former Yugoslavia in Bern, Switzerland, including Cardinal Vinko Puljic, Archbishop of Sarajevo, formally of Zagreb, Patriarch Pavle of the Serbian Orthodox Church and Grand Mufti Jakub efendi Selimoski of Sarajevo to call for an end to the conflict. What emerged was Erklärung von Bern in which they declared that "a crime in the name of religion is the greatest crime against religion." These efforts helped to forge a pathway to the Dayton Accord. In 2012, Rabbi Schneier helped commemorate the Srebrenica massacre that occurred during the breakup of Yugoslavia by delivering the keynote address at the 17th annual Srebrenica memorial. He is thus far the only non-Muslim to do so. During his address, Rabbi Schneier delivered a message from U.S. president Barack Obama.

In 1998, President Clinton appointed him as one of three religious leaders to discuss religious freedom with Chinese President Jiang Zemin. He led efforts to preserve and restore Ohel Rachel Synagogue, one of only two remaining historic synagogues in Shanghai. Throughout his career, Rabbi Schneier has convened six international conferences to ease ethnic and religious conflict and promote peace and tolerance.

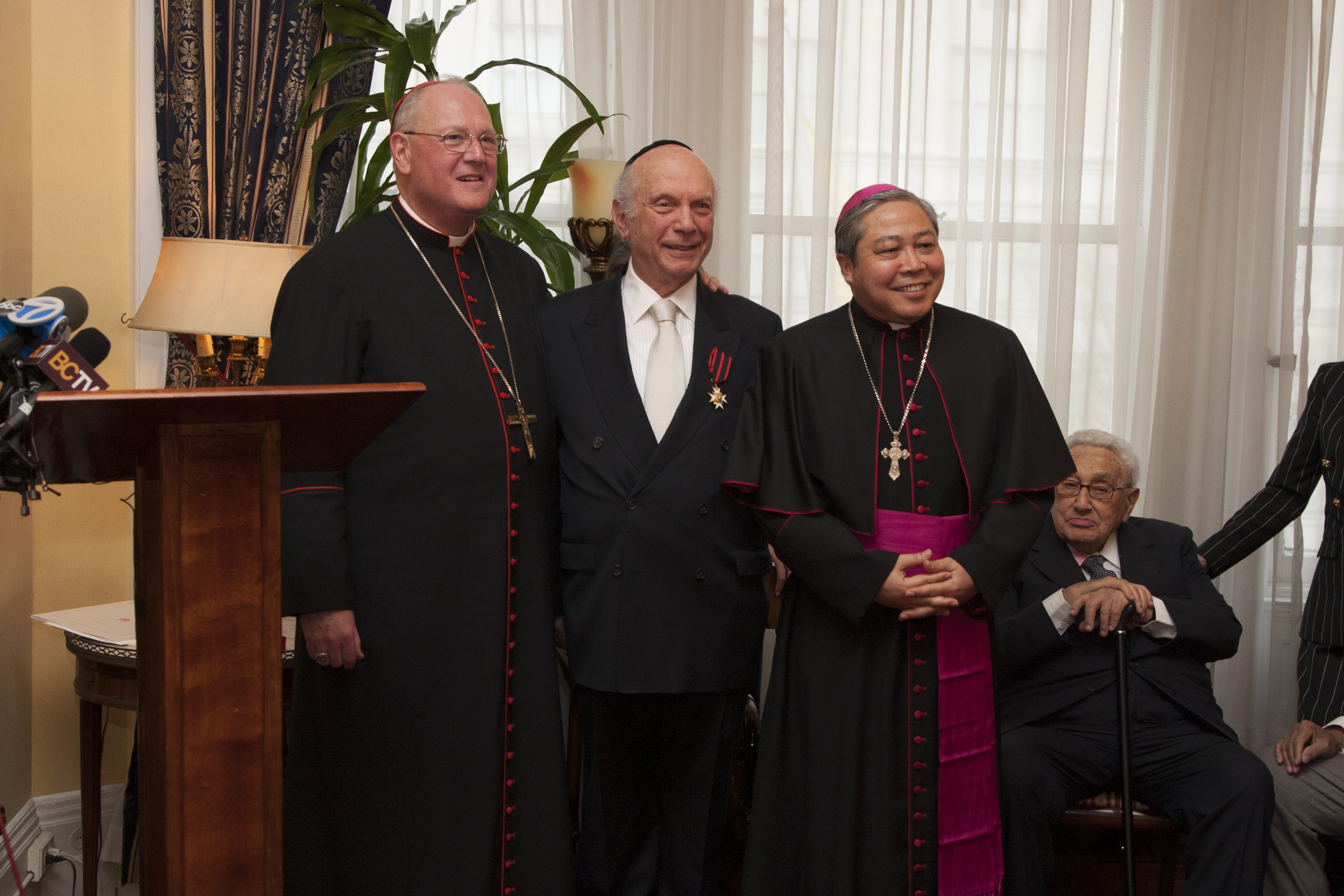
Schneier being conferred with a Papal Knighthood. From left, Cardinal Timothy M. Dolan, Rabbi Arthur Schneier and Archbishop Bernardito C. Auza

Rabbi Schneier also served as U.S. Alternate Representative at the U.N. General Assembly in 1988 and as a member of the U.S. Delegation for Return of the St. Steven Crown to Hungary in 1979. In 2006, he became a member of the United Nations Alliance of Civilizations High-Level Group (UNAOC) and in 2008, he was appointed an ambassador to the UNAOC. That same year, Rabbi Schneier was the keynote speaker at an Interfaith Conference convened by King Abdullah of Saudi Arabia in Madrid. In 2009, he had a private audience with Pope Benedict XVI to reaffirm Nostra Aetate adopted by Vatican Council II. In April 2015, Rabbi Schneier was conferred a Papal knighthood by The Roman Catholic Archdiocese of New York's Cardinal Timothy M. Dolan for the "good works that he’s done on behalf of religious freedom, international peace and justice.”

Following the contentious dismissal of Park East's former assistant rabbi, Benjamin Goldschmidt in 2021, Daniel L. Kurtz, a former head of the Charities Bureau at the New York State Attorney General's Office accused Rabbi Schneier of concentrating power at Park East in violation of state law.

He was the long time owner of the unique Bubble House brownstone at 271 E. 71st Street.

== Awards and recognitions ==
- Austria : Grand Decoration of Honor in Gold with Star for Service to the Republic of Austria (1997)
- Dr. Karl Renner Prize of the City of Vienna, Grand Decoration of Honor in Gold for Special Services to the Province of Vienna
- Hungary : Commander's Cross with the Star of the Order of Merit of the Republic of Hungary
- Order of St. Daniel of Moscow (Moscow Patriarchate, Russian Orthodox Church)
- Religious Liberty Award
- France : Legion of Honor
- Archons Athenagoras Human Rights Award
- United States : Presidential Citizens Medal
- United States : U.S. Department of State Special Recognition Award from Secretary Colin Powell “for his ecumenical work in favor of mutual understanding, tolerance and peace” (2002)
- Spain : Made a Knight Commander of the Order of Civil Merit by King Juan Carlos I of Spain (2009)
- Italy : The Order of the Star of Italian Solidarity (2009)
- Germany : Officer's Cross of the Order of Merit of the Federal Republic of Germany (2010)
- Croatia : Grand Order of King Dmitar Zvonimir (2011)
- United States : U.S. Department of State Special Recognition Award from Secretary Hillary Clinton “for his 30 years of partnership in helping Foreign Affairs professionals to better understand the right to religious freedom in the countries in which they serve” (2011)
- Vatican City : Order of Saint Sylvester from Pope Francis, to be awarded April 27, 2015.
- Named one of the 100 Most Trusted People in America by Reader's Digest in 2013
- Named one of the 50 Most Influential Rabbis in America 2009-2013 by Newsweek
- In 2004, Rabbi Schneier's alma mater, Yeshiva University, established the Rabbi Arthur Schneier Center for International Affairs in his honor.
- Hofstra University Garu Nanak Interfaith Prize
- Rabbi Schneier is the recipient of eleven honorary doctorates from U.S. and European universities.
- April 2015, conferred with a Papal Knighthood by Timothy Dolan, Cardinal of the Archdiocese of New York.
- 2019 Responsible Leaders Summit's Lifetime Achievement Award for promoting interfaith cooperation and understanding.

He is a member of Council on Foreign Relations; Asia Society; United Nations Development Corporation; United States Holocaust Memorial Museum, Committee on Conscience; Conference of Presidents of Major Jewish Organizations; Joint Distribution Committee; Past President and Honorary Chairman, Religious Zionists of America, Honorary Chairman, and serves as Vice President of the World Jewish Congress American Section.

== Personal life ==
Born in Vienna in 1930, Rabbi Schneier lived under Nazi occupation in Budapest during World War II and arrived in the United States in 1947. He is married to Elisabeth Nordmann Schneier and is the father of Rabbi Marc Schneier. Rabbi Schneier is a descendant of Rabbi Schneur Zalman of Liadi, the founder of the Chabad movement.
