= Ellis Hillman =

British politician (1928-1996)

Ellis Simon Hillman (17 November 1928 – 21 January 1996) was a British Labour politician, local councillor, Mayor of the London Borough of Barnet (1994–95) and polytechnic history lecturer.

His father was David Hillman, a well known producer of stained glass. He was born into a political family, related both to American labour leader Sidney Hillman and Chaim Herzog, sixth president of Israel. He was recruited to the Revolutionary Communist Party by Annie Roy in 1946 and joined its Kilburn branch. During this period he wrote to Natalia Sedova, Leon Trotsky's widow, about questions relating to the Soviet Union and the history of the Left Opposition.

He became a critical member of the Socialist Review Group where he produced a document, The Nature of the Stalinist Parties, which was rejected by the group and replied to by Duncan Hallas. This followed by a further document, On Organic Unity, where he advocated the group fuse with that of Ted Grant, which led to his expulsion.

Hillman then joined Gerry Healy's Club; however, he became a secret sympathiser of the Revolutionary Socialist League. Hillman went on to become the RSL's treasurer and a founder member of the Militant editorial board. In 1961, whilst a member of the RSL, Hillman wrote a guide for members who were elected to councils: Notes on Council Work.

Hillman was elected in the 1958 London County Council election, representing Norwood, then in the 1961 election he moved to represent Hackney Central. He represented Hackney and then Hackney Central on the Greater London Council until 1981 where he chaired the Arts and Recreation Committee.

Hillman was elected to Barnet council in 1986 and when in 1994 it fell to a Lib–Lab alliance he was elected Mayor. His first act was to remove a bust of Margaret Thatcher from Hendon Town Hall.

Hillman, who lived in Hendon, died at the London Chest Hospital in Bethnal Green in January 1996 whilst undergoing heart bypass surgery.
