= Mayer Hillman =

British architect and town planner (1931–2026)

- Born: 30 October 1931; London, England
- Died: 25 September 2026 (aged 94); London, England
- Education: University College London; University of Edinburgh
- Occupations: Architect and town planner
- Title: Senior Fellow Emeritus, Policy Studies Institute, University of Westminster
- Term: 1992–2026
- Spouse: Heidi Krott
- Children: 2 sons
- Website: Mayer Hillman's website

Mayer Hillman (30 October 1931 – 25 September 2026) was a British architect, environmentalist and town planner. He was a Senior Fellow Emeritus from 1992 at the Policy Studies Institute, University of Westminster where he worked for at least 30 years.

== Background ==
Hillman was born in West Hampstead, northwest London, on 30 October 1931, the third son of David Hillman, a portrait painter and stained glass artist, and Dr Annie Hillman, a general practice physician (GP).

He and his brothers were raised in West Hampstead, by their Scottish Jewish parents, and in Rickmansworth during the WWII bombing raids. He studied at the Bartlett School of Architecture, University College London and practiced as an architect for several years, before seeking a change in direction. He completed a PhD on transport, planning and environmental issues in 1970 at the University of Edinburgh, without a scholarship and supporting a young family with his wife Heidi Krott.

Established at the PSI, a policy thinktank, Hillman became an eclectic contributor to debates on transport, the environment and health. Several of his contrarian arguments and studies have been proven accurate with the passage of time. For example, he co-authored a 1990 study, One False Move, which equated the reduction in child casualties on British roads in recent decades with the loss of freedom that they have experienced because of the increase in traffic, with repercussions for child health. Several of his innovations, like raised-level intersections to slow traffic, have later been adopted in policy and planning.

== Environmentalism ==
Hillman believed that public policy should be more socially and environmentally conscious, and was an animated speaker on a variety of topics, in his later years completing two books and promoting action on climate change. A strong proponent of personal carbon trading, he specifically helped develop the concept of personal carbon allowances.

He was a lifelong cyclist, arguing against compulsory helmet laws in 1992, and in favour of cycling's health promotion possibilities in a British Medical Association report in 1992. As of 2018, Hillman had not flown for more than 20 years as part of his commitment to reducing carbon emissions. He argued that governments had failed to implement the policies required to achieve global zero carbon emissions and it was "now too late", but he still recommended individuals to become vegan or vegetarian, not own a car, stop flying and limit the size of their family.

In 2018, he became scornful of individual action which he described "as good as futile", rhetorically asking "can you see everyone in a democracy volunteering to give up flying? Can you see the majority of the population becoming vegan? Can you see the majority agreeing to restrict the size of their families?" He believed that, "Even if the world went zero-carbon today that would not save us because we've gone past the point of no return." He announced his withdrawal from speaking and writing on climate change and other topics in 2018, with these statements.

== Personal life and death ==
Hillman married Heidi Krott in 1964, and they had two sons, born in 1968 and 1970. Hillman was a lifelong vegetarian. He died on 25 September 2026, aged 94.

== Selected publications ==
- Hillman, M, T. Fawcett and S.C. Rajan. 2007. The Suicidal Planet: How to Prevent Global Climate Catastrophe. St. Martin’s Press.
- Hillman, M. and T. Fawcett. 2004. How We Can Save the Planet, Penguin. ISBN 0-14-101692-2
- Hillman M., J. Adams and J. Whitelegg. 1990. One False Move. Policy Studies Institute, ISBN 0-85374-494-7
- Hillman, M. 1993. Cycle helmets: the case for and against. Policy Studies Institute.
- Ekins P, M. Hillman and R. Hutchison. 1992. The Gaia Atlas of Green Economics. Anchor Books.
- Hillman, M. 1992. Cycling: Towards Health and Safety. BMA, Oxford University Press.

A festschrift volume was published on his 70th birthday in 2001. Hutchison R. (ed.). 2001. Ahead of Time: Birthday Letters to Mayer Hillman. London: PSI. Authors look backward from his 90th birthday in 2021, testing his earlier predictions and innovations.
