= David Hillman (artist) =

David Hillman (1893 – 14 May 1974) was a Lithuanian born British portrait and stained glass artist.

== Early life and education ==
Hillman's father was Shmuel Yitzchak Hillman, Head of the London Beth Din from 1914 until his retirement in 1934 at which time he immigrated to Israel. His ancestors included Rashi and the Maharal of Prague.

Born in Lithuania in 1893, he arrived in Glasgow with his family in 1908. At 15 years old, he sought entry as a student at Charles Rennie Mackintosh 's new Glasgow School of Art. This was to his father's displeasure, as he was an only son and appeared to be prepared to break a tradition of father-son rabbis. He was awarded scholarships for a total of 12 years at the school and, after his parents’ move to London in 1914, at the Royal Academy, where he graduated in 1920.

Hillman studied portraiture under William Orpen and John Singer Sargent, and stained glass under Sir George Frampton. During this period, largely coincident with the First World War, he engaged in biblical studies and then graduated as a rabbi, receiving his ordination from the Sephardi Chief Rabbi, Moses Gaster.

== Career ==
He was appointed Minister at the Sandys Row Synagogue in the East End of London. He painted the British Home Secretary in 1920, Edward Shortt, the distinguished Indian/Jewish Sassoon family, and his uncle Yitzhak HaLevi Herzog. He often took many months to complete one painting; he made a poor living, particularly during the Second World War.

He moved to stained glass in 1935, following a commission to design a window in Leeds Synagogue commemorating the Jubilee of King George V. Thereafter, he designed full sets of windows in several London synagogues, including Gt Portland Street, St John's Wood, St Albans, Walm Lane (now installed at Brondesbury Park Synagogue and elsewhere), and the Hechal Shlomo centre in Jerusalem. David Hillman was also active in the Association of German Refugees and, after the Second World War, taught art for years at the Maccabi Association.

== Family ==
In 1926, he married Annie Rabinowitz, also descended from a long line of rabbis. She was a general practitioner. David and Annie had three sons: Ellis Hillman, Harold Hillman and Mayer Hillman. Hillman's only sibling, Sarah, married Isaac Herzog, the first Ashkenazi Chief Rabbi of the State of Israel and father of Chaim Herzog.

== Death ==
Hillman died on 14 May 1974.
