= List of electoral divisions in Greater London =

This is a list of electoral divisions in Greater London that existed from 1 April 1965 for elections to the Greater London Council until 1 April 1986 when that authority was disbanded. When Greater London was created, Parliamentary constituencies straddled the boundary so it was not possible to use these areas for election of councillors. Until new constituencies were drawn by the Boundary Commission nationally, the London boroughs were used as 32 multiple-member electoral divisions, with the City of London and London Borough of Westminster treated as though they were one London borough. The divisions altogether returned 100 Greater London councillors and from 1973, returned 92. A successor body with modified powers was created in 2000, the Mayor of London and London Assembly and its divisions are London Assembly constituencies, with a form of proportional representation used.

== First series ==
It was planned to use Westminster Parliament constituencies as electoral areas for Greater London, as had been the practice for elections to the predecessor London County Council, but those that existed in 1965 crossed the Greater London boundary. Until new constituencies could be settled, the London boroughs were used as electoral areas. Westminster was joined with the City of London for this purpose. 32 electoral areas were used for the elections in 1964, 1967 and 1970. They were 'winner takes all' multiple member electoral areas using first-past-the-post voting. 100 councillors were elected in total. The Second Periodic Review of Westminster constituencies reported in 1969, but was not implemented in time for the 1970 election. There were minor revisions to Bromley and Croydon in 1969 and Richmond upon Thames in 1970 when the Greater London boundary was adjusted. The number of councillors elected for each electoral division is shown.

- Barking, 2
- Barnet, 4
- Bexley, 3
- Brent, 4
- Bromley, 4
- Camden, 3
- Croydon, 4
- Ealing, 4
- Enfield, 3
- Greenwich, 3
- Hackney, 3
- Hammersmith, 3
- Haringey, 3
- Harrow, 3
- Havering, 3
- Hillingdon, 3
- Hounslow, 3
- Islington, 3
- Kensington and Chelsea, 3
- Kingston upon Thames, 2
- Lambeth, 4
- Lewisham, 4
- Merton, 2
- Newham, 3
- Redbridge, 3
- Richmond upon Thames, 2
- Southwark, 4
- Sutton, 2
- Tower Hamlets, 2
- Waltham Forest, 3
- Wandsworth, 4
- Westminster and the City of London, 4

== Second series ==
92 electoral divisions were used for the elections in 1973, 1977 and 1981. They were defined as electoral areas by statutory instrument on 20 June 1972 and were renamed electoral divisions by the Local Government Act 1972 later that year. Each electoral division returned one councillor using first-past-the-post voting. These areas were identical to the Westminster constituencies from 1974 to 1983 that had been defined in 1970. 92 councillors were elected in total. There was a minor revision to Uxbridge in 1982 when the Greater London boundary was adjusted. The electoral divisions were abolished with the Greater London Council in 1986.

- Acton
- Barking
- Battersea North
- Battersea South
- Beckenham
- Bermondsey
- Bethnal Green and Bow
- Bexleyheath
- Brent East
- Brent North
- Brent South
- Brentford and Isleworth
- Carshalton
- Chelsea
- Chingford
- Chipping Barnet
- Chislehurst
- City of London and Westminster South
- Croydon Central
- Croydon North East
- Croydon North West
- Croydon South
- Dagenham
- Deptford
- Dulwich
- Ealing North
- Edmonton
- Enfield North
- Erith and Crayford
- Feltham and Heston
- Finchley
- Fulham
- Greenwich
- Hackney Central
- Hackney North and Stoke Newington
- Hackney South and Shoreditch
- Hammersmith North
- Hampstead
- Harrow Central
- Harrow East
- Harrow West
- Hayes and Harlington
- Hendon North
- Hendon South
- Holborn and St Pancras South
- Hornchurch
- Hornsey
- Ilford North
- Ilford South
- Islington Central
- Islington North
- Islington South and Finsbury
- Kensington
- Kingston upon Thames
- Lambeth Central
- Lewisham East
- Lewisham West
- Leyton
- Mitcham and Morden
- Newham North East
- Newham North West
- Newham South
- Norwood
- Orpington
- Paddington
- Peckham
- Putney
- Ravensbourne
- Richmond
- Romford
- Ruislip-Northwood
- St Marylebone
- St Pancras North
- Sidcup
- Southall
- Southgate
- Stepney and Poplar
- Streatham
- Surbiton
- Sutton and Cheam
- Tooting
- Tottenham
- Twickenham
- Upminster
- Uxbridge
- Vauxhall
- Walthamstow
- Wanstead and Woodford
- Wimbledon
- Wood Green
- Woolwich East
- Woolwich West

== Replacement ==
In 1986 there were direct elections to the Inner London Education Authority from 29 electoral areas in Inner London.

In 2000, the Greater London Authority successor body with modified powers was created. It included a Mayor of London and London Assembly of both Londonwide representatives elected through proportional representation and local representatives elected from first-past-the-post London Assembly constituencies.

== See also ==
- List of electoral wards in Greater London
- London Assembly constituencies
- List of parliamentary constituencies in London
