= Kingston upon Thames (electoral division) =

Electoral division in Greater London, 1965–1986

Kingston upon Thames was an electoral division for the purposes of elections to the Greater London Council. The constituency elected two councillors for a three-year term in 1964, 1967 and 1970.

The constituency was revised in 1973 and then elected one councillor for a four-year term in 1973, 1977 and 1981, with the final term extended for an extra year ahead of the abolition of the Greater London Council.

== History ==
It was planned to use the same boundaries as the Westminster Parliament constituencies for election of councillors to the Greater London Council (GLC), as had been the practice for elections to the predecessor London County Council, but those that existed in 1965 crossed the Greater London boundary. Until new constituencies could be settled, the 32 London boroughs were used as electoral areas which therefore created a constituency called Kingston upon Thames.

The new constituencies were settled following the Second Periodic Review of Westminster constituencies and the electoral division was replaced from 1973 by the single-member electoral divisions of Kingston upon Thames and Surbiton. The new Kingston upon Thames electoral division matched the boundaries of the Kingston upon Thames parliamentary constituency.

== First series ==
Kingston upon Thames
- Former electoral division for the Greater London Council
- Kingston upon Thames electoral division boundaries
- District: London Borough of Kingston upon Thames
- Population: 143,670 (1969 estimate)
- Electorate: 102,862 (1964); 101,890 (1967); 107,147 (1970)
- Area: 9,279.1 acres (37.551 km^{2})

Former electoral division
- Created: 1965
- Abolished: 1973
- Member: 2
- Replaced by: Kingston upon Thames and Surbiton

The Kingston upon Thames constituency was used for the Greater London Council elections in 1964, 1967 and 1970. Two councillors were elected at each election using first-past-the-post voting.

=== 1964 election ===
The first election was held on 9 April 1964, a year before the council came into its powers. The electorate was 102,862 and two Conservative Party councillors were elected. With 51,570 people voting, the turnout was 50.1%. The councillors were elected for a three-year term.

1964 Greater London Council election: Kingston upon Thames
Party	Candidate	Votes	%	±%
Conservative	Sydney William Leonard Ripley	26,252		
Conservative	Geoffrey John David Seaton	25,868		
Labour	E. K. Leggett	16,411		
Labour	C. Lesser	16,068		
Liberal	J. P. Farmer	6,788		
Liberal	A. M. Hollis	6,705		
Communist	D. E. Wilson	1,039		
Union Movement	A. J. C. Murray	944		
Turnout				
Conservative win (new seat)				
Conservative win (new seat)				

=== 1967 election ===
The second election was held on 13 April 1967. The electorate was 101,890 and two Conservative Party councillors were elected. With 45,924 people voting, the turnout was 45.1%. The councillors were elected for a three-year term.

1967 Greater London Council election: Kingston upon Thames
Party	Candidate	Votes	%	±%
Conservative	Geoffrey John David Seaton	29,657		
Conservative	Sydney William Leonard Ripley	29,646		
Labour	E. K. Leggett	11,251		
Labour	T. Braddock	11,251		
Liberal	J. R. Pledger	3,692		
Liberal	D. B. Terry	3,470		
Communist	D. E. Wilson	925		
Turnout				
Conservative hold		Swing		
Conservative hold		Swing		

=== 1970 election ===
The third election was held on 9 April 1970. The electorate was 107,147 and two Conservative Party councillors were elected. With 40,171 people voting, the turnout was 37.5%. The councillors were elected for a three-year term.

1970 Greater London Council election: Kingston upon Thames
Party	Candidate	Votes	%	±%
Conservative	Sydney William Leonard Ripley	26,269		
Conservative	Geoffrey John David Seaton	26,075		
Labour	R. Kerr-Waller	9,833		
Labour	T. Mitchell	9,251		
Liberal	M. Freedman	2,962		
Liberal	G. D. Bell	2,736		
Independent	E. Scruby	1,065		
Communist	D. E. Wilson	438		
Homes before Roads	B. Hughes	220		
Union Movement	J. R. McLaren	159		
Turnout				
Conservative hold		Swing		
Conservative hold		Swing		

== Second series ==
Kingston upon Thames
- Former electoral division for the Greater London Council
- District: Kingston upon Thames
- Electorate: 59,496 (1973); 57,880 (1977); 56,824 (1981)
- Area: 1,849 hectares (18.49 km^{2})

Former electoral division
- Created: 1973
- Abolished: 1986
- Member: 1
- Created from: Kingston upon Thames

The Kingston upon Thames constituency was used for the Greater London Council elections in 1973, 1977 and 1981. One councillor was elected at each election using first-past-the-post voting.

=== 1973 election ===
The fourth election to the GLC (and first using revised boundaries) was held on 12 April 1973. The electorate was 59,496 and one Conservative Party councillor was elected. The turnout was 39.0%. The councillor was elected for a three-year term. This was extended for an extra year in 1976 when the electoral cycle was switched to four-yearly.

1973 Greater London Council election: Kingston upon Thames
Party	Candidate	Votes	%	±%
Conservative	Sydney William Leonard Ripley	12,145	52.27	
Labour	P. W. Lane	6,855	29.51	
Liberal	L. F. Wells	4,224	18.20	
Turnout				
Conservative hold		Swing		

=== 1977 election ===
The fifth election to the GLC (and second using revised boundaries) was held on 5 May 1977. The electorate was 57,880 and one Conservative Party councillor was elected. The turnout was 43.9%. The councillor was elected for a four-year term.

1977 Greater London Council election: Kingston upon Thames
Party	Candidate	Votes	%	±%
Conservative	Sydney William Leonard Ripley	16,568	65.19	
Labour	A. M. Barker	4,615	18.16	
Liberal	J. Bodden	3,126	12.29	
National Front	D. M. Foster	700	2.75	
Communist	D. E. Wilson	211	0.83	
GLC Abolitionist Campaign	P. E. L. M. Russell	199	0.78	
Turnout				
Conservative hold		Swing		

=== 1981 election ===
The sixth and final election to the GLC (and third using revised boundaries) was held on 7 May 1981. The electorate was 56,824 and one Conservative Party councillor was elected. The turnout was 42.4%. The councillor was elected for a four-year term, extended by an extra year by the Local Government (Interim Provisions) Act 1984, ahead of the abolition of the council.

1981 Greater London Council election: Kingston upon Thames
Party	Candidate	Votes	%	±%
Conservative	Sydney William Leonard Ripley	11,551	47.99	
Labour	Stuart H. J. Hercock	5,739	23.83	
Liberal	Stephen J. Harris	4,894	20.33	
SDP	Anthony M. Ward	1,544	6.41	
Ecology	Mike Elam	355	1.47	
Turnout				
Conservative hold		Swing		
