= Hampstead (electoral division) =

Electoral division in Greater London, 1973–1986

- Former electoral division for the Greater London Council
- Hampstead electoral division boundaries
- District: Camden
- Electorate: 66,172 (1973); 63,415 (1977); 60,294 (1981)
- Major settlements: Hampstead
- Area: 912 hectares (9.12 km^{2}) (1973); 911 hectares (9.11 km^{2}) (1977/1981)

Former electoral division
- Created: 1973
- Abolished: 1986
- Member: 1
- Created from: Camden

Hampstead was an electoral division for the purposes of elections to the Greater London Council. The constituency elected one councillor for a four-year term in 1973, 1977 and 1981, with the final term extended for an extra year ahead of the abolition of the Greater London Council.

== History ==
It was planned to use the same boundaries as the Westminster Parliament constituencies for election of councillors to the Greater London Council (GLC), as had been the practice for elections to the predecessor London County Council, but those that existed in 1965 crossed the Greater London boundary. Until new constituencies could be settled, the 32 London boroughs were used as electoral areas. The London Borough of Camden formed the Camden electoral division. This was used for the Greater London Council elections in 1964, 1967 and 1970.

The new constituencies were settled following the Second Periodic Review of Westminster constituencies and the new electoral division matched the boundaries of the Hampstead parliamentary constituency.

It covered an area of 912 hectares (9.12 km^{2}) in 1973. Revisions to ward boundaries in the London Borough of Camden changed the area of the division to 911 hectares (9.11 km^{2}) for the 1977 and 1981 elections.

== Elections ==
The Hampstead constituency was used for the Greater London Council elections in 1973, 1977 and 1981. One councillor was elected at each election using first-past-the-post voting.

=== 1973 election ===
The fourth election to the GLC (and first using revised boundaries) was held on 12 April 1973. The electorate was 66,172 and one Labour Party councillor was elected. The turnout was 38.6%. The councillor was elected for a three-year term. This was extended for an extra year in 1976 when the electoral cycle was switched to four-yearly.

1973 Greater London Council election: Hampstead
Party	Candidate	Votes	%	±%
Labour	Enid Barbara Wistrich	12,268	47.99	
Conservative	I. Clarke	9,823	38.45	
Liberal	R. A. P. Benad	2,824	11.04	
Communist	R. Champion	466	1.82	
Socialist (GB)	L. J. Cox	191	0.75	
Turnout				
Labour win (new seat)				

=== 1977 election ===
The fifth election to the GLC (and second using revised boundaries) was held on 5 May 1977. The electorate was 63,415 and one Conservative Party councillor was elected. The turnout was 44.8%. The councillor was elected for a four-year term.

1977 Greater London Council election: Hampstead
Party	Candidate	Votes	%	±%
Conservative	Alan David Greengross	15,352	53.99	
Labour	Enid Barbara Wistrich	10,000	35.18	
Liberal	R. J. Waddington	1,915	6.74	
National Front	G. T. Callow	425	1.49	
Communist	A. Thomas	399	1.40	
GLC Abolitionist Campaign	D. J. Farrer	199	0.70	
Socialist (GB)	L. J. Cox	143	0.50	
Turnout				
Conservative gain from Labour		Swing		

=== 1981 election ===
The sixth and final election to the GLC (and third using revised boundaries) was held on 7 May 1981. The electorate was 60,294 and one Conservative Party councillor was elected. The turnout was 45.9%. The councillor was elected for a four-year term, extended by an extra year by the Local Government (Interim Provisions) Act 1984, ahead of the abolition of the council.

1981 Greater London Council election: Hampstead
Party	Candidate	Votes	%	±%
Conservative	Alan David Greengross	12,367	44.72	
Labour	Margaret A. V. Bowman	10,446	37.77	
Liberal	Roger G. Billins	4,095	14.81	
Ecology	lain M. Huddleston	677	2.45	
Save London Action Group	Anthony Bryant Patrick Mockler	73	0.26	
Turnout				
Conservative hold		Swing		
