= Finchley (electoral division) =

Electoral division in Greater London, 1973–1986

- Former electoral division for the Greater London Council
- District: Barnet
- Electorate: 54,962 (1973); 56,321 (1975); 55,844 (1977); 55,018 (1981)
- Area: 1,456 hectares (14.56 km^{2})

Former electoral division
- Created: 1973
- Abolished: 1986
- Member: 1
- Created from: Barnet

Finchley was an electoral division for the purposes of elections to the Greater London Council. The constituency elected one councillor for a four-year term in 1973, 1977 and 1981, with the final term extended for an extra year ahead of the abolition of the Greater London Council.

== History ==
It was planned to use the same boundaries as the Westminster Parliament constituencies for election of councillors to the Greater London Council (GLC), as had been the practice for elections to the predecessor London County Council, but those that existed in 1965 crossed the Greater London boundary. Until new constituencies could be settled, the 32 London boroughs were used as electoral areas. The London Borough of Barnet formed the Barnet electoral division. This was used for the Greater London Council elections in 1964, 1967 and 1970.

The new constituencies were settled following the Second Periodic Review of Westminster constituencies and the new electoral division matched the boundaries of the Finchley parliamentary constituency.

It covered an area of 1,456 hectares (14.56 km^{2}).

== Elections ==
The Finchley constituency was used for the Greater London Council elections in 1973, 1977 and 1981. One councillor was elected at each election using first-past-the-post voting.

=== 1973 election ===
The fourth election to the GLC (and first using revised boundaries) was held on 12 April 1973. The electorate was 54,962 and one Conservative Party councillor was elected. The turnout was 29.8%. The councillor was elected for a three-year term. This was extended for an extra year in 1976 when the electoral cycle was switched to four-yearly.

1973 Greater London Council election: Finchley
Party	Candidate	Votes	%	±%
Conservative	Jean Leslie Scott	8,008	48.93	
Labour	Albert Edward Tomlinson	5,183	31.68	
Liberal	Leonard W. Watkins	3,175	19.39	
Turnout				
Conservative win (new seat)				

=== 1975 by-election ===
A by-election was held on 15 May 1975, caused by the resignation of Jean Leslie Scott. The electorate was 56,321 and one Conservative Party councillor was elected. The turnout was 31.2%. Roland John Michael Freeman represented Westminster and the City of London from 1967 to 1970.

Finchley by-election, 1975
Party	Candidate	Votes	%	±%
Conservative	Roland John Michael Freeman	9,804	55.74	
Labour	Michael L. Freeman	5,388	30.64	
Liberal	R. J. Eccles	1,636	9.30	
National Front	D. H. Fereday	760	4.32	
Turnout				
Conservative hold		Swing		

=== 1977 election ===
The fifth election to the GLC (and second using revised boundaries) was held on 5 May 1977. The electorate was 55,844 and one Conservative Party councillor was elected. The turnout was 43.2%. The councillor was elected for a four-year term.

1977 Greater London Council election: Finchley
Party	Candidate	Votes	%	±%
Conservative	Roland John Michael Freeman	14,758	61.17	
Labour	A. J. Wall	6,228	25.81	
Liberal	Bruce A. Standing	2,095	8.68	
National Front	Philip A. Ruddock	1,066	4.42	
Turnout				
Conservative hold		Swing		

=== 1981 election ===
The sixth and final election to the GLC (and third using revised boundaries) was held on 7 May 1981. The electorate was 55,018 and one Conservative Party councillor was elected. The turnout was 41.9%. The councillor was elected for a four-year term, extended by an extra year by the Local Government (Interim Provisions) Act 1984, ahead of the abolition of the council.

1981 Greater London Council election: Finchley
Party	Candidate	Votes	%	±%
Conservative	Neville Beale	10,710	46.46	
Labour	Thomas McKendry	8,991	39.01	
Liberal	Christopher Perkin	2,702	11.72	
Ecology	Maureen T. Colmans	525	2.28	
Abolish the GLC	Andrew M. Moncreiff	113	0.49	
Turnout				
Conservative hold		Swing		
