= Surbiton (electoral division) =

Electoral division in Greater London, 1973–1986

- Former electoral division for the Greater London Council
- District: Kingston upon Thames
- Electorate: 46,318 (1973); 46,927 (1977); 46,600 (1981); 47,156 (1983)
- Major settlements: Surbiton
- Area: 1,905 hectares (19.05 km^{2})

Former electoral division
- Created: 1973
- Abolished: 1986
- Member: 1
- Created from: Kingston upon Thames

Surbiton was an electoral division for the purposes of elections to the Greater London Council. The constituency elected one councillor for a four-year term in 1973, 1977 and 1981, with the final term extended for an extra year ahead of the abolition of the Greater London Council.

== History ==
It was planned to use the same boundaries. as the Westminster Parliament constituencies for election of councillors to the Greater London Council (GLC), as had been the practice for elections to the predecessor London County Council, but those that existed in 1965 crossed the Greater London boundary. Until new constituencies could be settled, the 32 London boroughs were used as electoral areas. The London Borough of Kingston upon Thames formed the Kingston upon Thames electoral division. This was used for the Greater London Council elections in 1964, 1967 and 1970.

The new constituencies were settled following the Second Periodic Review of Westminster constituencies and the new electoral division matched the boundaries of the Surbiton parliamentary constituency.

It covered an area of 1,905 hectares (19.05 km^{2}).

== Elections ==
The Surbiton constituency was used for the Greater London Council elections in 1973, 1977 and 1981. One councillor was elected at each election using first-past-the-post voting.

=== 1973 election ===
The fourth election to the GLC (and first using revised boundaries) was held on 12 April 1973. The electorate was 46,318 and one Conservative Party councillor was elected. The turnout was 41.2%. The councillor was elected for a three-year term. This was extended for an extra year in 1976 when the electoral cycle was switched to four-yearly.

1973 Greater London Council election: Surbiton
| Party | Candidate | Votes | % | ±% |
|---|---|---|---|---|
| Conservative | Geoffrey John David Seaton | 8,821 | 46.26 | |
| Labour | R. R. G. Viner | 5,972 | 31.34 | |
| Liberal | T. A. Channings | 3,966 | 20.80 | |
| Independent | E. Scruby | 303 | 1.59 | |
| Turnout | | | | |
| Conservative win (new seat) | | | | |

=== 1977 election ===
The fifth election to the GLC (and second using revised boundaries) was held on 5 May 1977. The electorate was 46,927 and one Conservative Party councillor was elected. The turnout was 45.7%. The councillor was elected for a four-year term.

1977 Greater London Council election: Surbiton
| Party | Candidate | Votes | % | ±% |
|---|---|---|---|---|
| Conservative | Geoffrey John David Seaton | 13,934 | 65.04 | |
| Labour | C. P. Moore | 4,136 | 19.31 | |
| Liberal | J. L. Tilley | 2,411 | 11.26 | |
| National Front | J. Sawyer | 508 | 2.37 | |
| GLC Abolitionist Campaign | T. W. Benford | 433 | 2.02 | |
| Turnout | | | | |
| Conservative hold | | Swing | | |

=== 1981 election ===
The sixth and final election to the GLC (and third using revised boundaries) was held on 7 May 1981. The electorate was 46,600 and one Conservative Party councillor was elected. The turnout was 42.6%. The councillor was elected for a four-year term, extended by an extra year by the Local Government (Interim Provisions) Act 1984, ahead of the abolition of the council.

1981 Greater London Council election: Surbiton
| Party | Candidate | Votes | % | ±% |
|---|---|---|---|---|
| Conservative | Geoffrey John David Seaton | 9,998 | 50.33 | |
| Labour | A. S. MacKinlay | 6,056 | 30.49 | |
| Liberal | P. T. Humphrey | 3,246 | 16.34 | |
| Ecology | J. MacLelland | 482 | 2.43 | |
| Independent | P. E. L. M. Russell | 82 | 0.41 | |
| Turnout | | | | |
| Conservative hold | | Swing | | |

Russell: Abolitionist

=== 1983 by-election ===
A by-election was held on 15 September 1983, following the resignation of Geoffrey Seaton. The electorate was 47,156 and one Conservative Party councillor was elected. The turnout was 25.0%.

Surbiton by-election, 1983
| Party | Candidate | Votes | % | ±% |
|---|---|---|---|---|
| Conservative | Anthony Francis Arbour | 5,458 | 46.38 | |
| Alliance | C. Nowakowski | 3,870 | 32.88 | |
| Labour | A. H. McGowan | 2,184 | 18.55 | |
| Ecology | J. Maclellan | 202 | 1.72 | |
| Communist | J. S. F. Turner | 58 | 0.49 | |
| Turnout | | | | |
| Conservative hold | | Swing | | |

Anthony Francis Arbour would be elected in 2000 to the London Assembly from the South West constituency.
