= 1977 Greater London Council election =

Local election in England

- 5 May 1977

92 councillors 47 seats needed for a majority
	First party	Second party
Leader	Horace Cutler	Reg Goodwin
Party	Conservative	Labour
Leader's seat	Harrow West	Bermondsey
Seats before	32	58
Seats won	64	28
Seat change	▲32	▼30
Popular vote	1,177,390	737,194
Percentage	52.5%	32.9%
Swing	▲14.5%	▼14.5%
	Third party	Fourth party
Party	Liberal	National Front
Seats before	2	0
Seats won	0	0
Seat change	▼2	Steady
Popular vote	174,405	119,060
Percentage	7.8%	5.3%
Swing	▼4.7%	▲4.8%
- Results by electoral division
Leader before election
Reg Goodwin
Labour
Leader after election
Horace Cutler
Conservative

The fifth election to the Greater London Council (GLC) was held on 5 May 1977. The Conservatives, led by Horace Cutler, gained control of the council from Labour.

== Electoral arrangements ==
The GLC was elected from 92 single-member electoral divisions which were identical with the Parliamentary constituencies in Greater London. The election date was fixed by section 43 of the Local Government Act 1972 as the first Thursday in May. Councillors had been elected for a three-year term at previous elections, with those elected in 1973 having their terms extended to four years in 1976. From the 1977 election councillors were elected for a four-year term. All aldermen went out of office in 1977 and no further aldermen were elected by the council.

== Results ==
The Conservative Party won a majority of seats at the election. The Liberal Party lost both of its councillors.

Party	Votes			Seats			
Party	Number	%	+/-	Stood	Seats	%	+/-
Conservative	1,177,390	52.5	▲14.5	92	64	69.6	▲32
Labour	737,194	32.9	▼14.5	92	28	30.4	▼30
Liberal	174,405	7.8	▼4.7	92	0	0.0	▼2
National Front	119,060	5.3	▲4.8	91	0	0.0	Steady
National Party	8,300	0.4	New	22	0	0.0	Steady
Communist	8,267	0.4	▼0.2	24	0	0.0	Steady
GLC Abolitionist Campaign	7,869	0.4	New	31	0	0.0	Steady
International Marxist	1,930	0.1	New	4	0	0.0	Steady
Independent	1,834	0.1	▼0.1	9	0	0.0	Steady
People	1,621	0.1	New	2	0	0.0	Steady
Ind. Conservative	1,025	0.0	▼0.1	1	0	0.0	Steady
Independent Liberal	878	0.0	New	3	0	0.0	Steady
English National	685	0.0	New	5	0	0.0	Steady
Fellowship	552	0.0	New	1	0	0.0	Steady
Socialist (GB)	502	0.0	▼0.1	4	0	0.0	Steady
Ecology	298	0.0	New	1	0	0.0	Steady
New Britain	254	0.0	New	1	0	0.0	Steady

Turnout: 2,242,064 people voted.

== Constituency results ==
Members of the old council*

=== Barking ===
Barking
Party	Candidate	Votes	%	±%
Labour	John Benjamin Ward*	10,536	64.8%	
Conservative	Charles E Packer	2,417	14.9%	
National Front	Colin M London	1,820	11.2%	
Liberal	Mrs Angela E Bush	1,477	9.1%	
Majority		8119	49.9%	
Turnout		16250		

Dagenham
Party	Candidate	Votes	%	±%
Labour	Harry Kay	12,450	49.5%	
Conservative	Gary L Hyams	8,761	34.8%	
Independent Labour	I R Newport	2,036	8.1%	
Liberal	George Daniel Poole	1,493	4.9%	
Communist	Frederick J Creamer	429	1.7%	
Majority		3689	14.7%	
Turnout		25169		

=== Barnet ===
Chipping Barnet
Party	Candidate	Votes	%	±%
Conservative	Mark Jonathan David Damian Lister Patterson	17,095	66.4%	
Labour	Geoffrey N. Cooke	5171	20.1%	
Liberal	David Harry Ive	2491	9.7%	
National Front	Daniel J. Monk	989	3.8%	
Majority		11924	46.3%	
Turnout		25746		

Finchley
Party	Candidate	Votes	%	±%
Conservative	Roland John Michael Freeman*	14758	61.1%	
Labour	Alan J Wall	6228	25.8%	
Liberal	Bruce A. Standing	2095	8.7%	
National Front	Philip A Ruddock	1066	4.4%	
Majority		8530	35.3%	
Turnout		24147		

Hendon North
Party	Candidate	Votes	%	±%
Conservative	Bryan Michael Deece Cassidy	14987	58.5%	
Labour	Frank Arthur Cooper*	7617	29.7%	
National Front	D. V. Roebuck	1528	6.0%	
Liberal	B. M. Craymer	1500	5.9%	
Majority		7370	28.8%	
Turnout		25632		

Hendon South
Party	Candidate	Votes	%	±%
Conservative	Peter Blair Black*			
Labour	P Benson			
Liberal	Brian E. J. Ellis			
National Front	Susan E. Warner			
Independent	G L Moon			
Majority				
Turnout				

=== Bexley ===
Bexleyheath
Party	Candidate	Votes	%	±%
Conservative	Victor Rae Muske Langton*			
Labour	Mrs E M Marsh			
Liberal	John H Crowhurst			
National Front	Alan John Wilkens			
National Party	James D Turner			
Majority				
Turnout				

Erith & Crayford
Party	Candidate	Votes	%	±%
Conservative	Richard Town			
Labour	Francis William Archer*			
Liberal	I. J. C. Goodwin			n/a
National Front	Owen Hawke			
Majority				
Turnout				

Sidcup
Party	Candidate	Votes	%	±%
Conservative	Rodney Charles Gent			
Labour	William M N Davies			
Liberal	Elaine Burraston			
National Front	M. L. Wynn			
Majority				
Turnout				

=== Brent ===
Brent East
Party	Candidate	Votes	%	±%
Labour	Norman Howard*			
Conservative	Arthur R. Steel			
National Front	John Russell Davies			
Ind. Conservative	Gerard Pierre-Michel			
Liberal	William Henry Pitt			
Majority				
Turnout				

Brent North
Party	Candidate	Votes	%	±%
Conservative	Alan Hardy*			
Labour	Lawrence M. Nerva			
Liberal	Colin F Scofield			
National Front	Graham John			
GLC Abolitionist Campaign	G. G. Fiegel			
Majority				
Turnout				

Brent South
Party	Candidate	Votes	%	±%
Labour	Illtyd Harrington*			
Conservative	Rupert William Simon Allason			
National Front	George William Bryant			
Liberal	John H Gover			
Communist	Leslie George Burt			
Independent	I. Gottlieb			
Majority				
Turnout				

=== Bromley ===
Beckenham
Party	Candidate	Votes	%	±%
Conservative	Frank Willie Smith*			
Labour	Jonathan Watkin Mordecai			
Liberal	Phillip F Khan-Panni			
National Front	Geoffrey J Parker			
English National	H. T. W. Childs			
Majority				
Turnout				

Chislehurst
Party	Candidate	Votes	%	±%
Conservative	Joan Kathleen Wykes*			
Labour	Walter Kenneth Mansfield			
Liberal	John R. Hassall			
National Front	R. C. Clifford			
GLC Abolitionist Campaign	V. S. Rose			
English National	Frank H. Hansford-Miller			
Majority				
Turnout				

Orpington
Party	Candidate	Votes	%	±%
Conservative	Jean Tatham*			
Liberal	Sandra E Ward			
Labour	Doris Partridge			
National Front	Roy E J Bond			n/a
English National	Phyllis Hansford-Miller			n/a
Majority				
Turnout				

Ravensbourne
Party	Candidate	Votes	%	±%
Conservative	Michael John Wheeler			
Labour	John Richard Holbrook			
Liberal	Ronald Lawrence Coverson			
National Front	George V Askew			n/a
GLC Abolitionist Campaign	D. J. Murray			n/a
English National	F. E. Saffery			n/a
Majority				
Turnout				

=== Camden ===
Hampstead
Party	Candidate	Votes	%	±%
Conservative	Alan David Greengross			
Labour	Enid Barbara Wistrich*			
Liberal	Richard J Waddington			
National Front	Gordon Thomas Callow			n/a
Communist	Alan Thomas			
GLC Abolitionist Campaign	D. J. Farrer			n/a
Socialist (GB)	L. J. Cox			
Majority				
Turnout				

Holborn & St Pancras South
Party	Candidate	Votes	%	±%
Labour	Richard Collins			
Conservative	Christopher D Radmore			
Liberal	G. Knowles			
National Front	John Lilburne-Philpot			n/a
Socialist (GB)	P. M. Deutz			
Majority				
Turnout				

St Pancras North
Party	Candidate	Votes	%	±%
Labour	Anne Hallowell Sofer			
Conservative	Michael J Frost			
Liberal	June Mather			n/a
National Front	Linda D Evans			n/a
Communist	V. A. Heath			
Majority				
Turnout				

=== Croydon ===
Croydon Central
Party	Candidate	Votes	%	±%
Conservative	Gordon William Herbert Taylor			
Labour	David Frank White*			
Liberal	Roy A Lightwing			
National Front	Peter William Moss			n/a
National Party	William H Porter			
Majority				
Turnout				

Croydon North East
Party	Candidate	Votes	%	±%
Conservative	Gladys Emma Morgan*			
Labour	David Howard Simpson			
Liberal	Alan Taylor			
National Party	Steve J. Brady			
GLC Abolitionist Campaign	Anthony J Cordle			
Majority				
Turnout				

Croydon North West
Party	Candidate	Votes	%	±%
Conservative	Stephen James Stewart			
Labour	Audrey M Simpson			
Liberal	Janet R. Pitt			
National Front	P. J. Weedon			
National Party	Tom Lamb			
GLC Abolitionist Campaign	D. P. Furderer			
Majority				
Turnout				

Croydon South
Party	Candidate	Votes	%	±%
Conservative	Geoffrey Weston Aplin*			
Liberal	Margaret R A Billenness			
Labour	Charles E Payne			
National Front	Roland Dummer			
National Party	P. W. R. G. Benwell			
Majority				
Turnout				

=== Ealing ===
Acton
Party	Candidate	Votes	%	±%
Conservative	John Chaytor Dobson*	16,		
Labour	Peter C Eckles			
Liberal	Simon James Rowley			
National Front	Clive Brian Wakley			
Communist	Malcolm Mitchell			
Independent	K. S. Blakebrough			
Majority				
Turnout				

Ealing North
Party	Candidate	Votes	%	±%
Conservative	Malby Sturges Crofton			
Labour	Peter Downham			
Liberal	John L Salmon			
National Front	Raymond J Marsh			
National Party	T. Connolly			
Majority				
Turnout				

Southall
Party	Candidate	Votes	%	±%
Labour	Yvonne Sieve*			
Conservative	R. Schindler			
Liberal	Kenneth R Stevens			
National Front	Bernard P Franklin			
International Marxist	Gerry A. Hedley			
Majority				
Turnout				

=== Enfield ===
Edmonton
Party	Candidate	Votes	%	±%
Conservative	Harry William Corpe			
Labour	John Golden Warren			
National Front	Royston Clive Pert			
Liberal	J. Simkins			
GLC Abolitionist Campaign	Terence Jiggins			
Majority				
Turnout				

Enfield North
Party	Candidate	Votes	%	±%
Conservative	John Alfred Boris Connors			
Labour	John Howard White*			
Liberal	L Eric L Ridge			
National Front	Keith Davies			
GLC Abolitionist Campaign	Dennis J. E. Keighley			
Majority				
Turnout				

Southgate
Party	Candidate	Votes	%	±%
Conservative	Rachel Trixie Anne Gardner			
Labour	Robert A. Dick			
Liberal	Cyril S. Pike			
National Front	Trevor M. Smith			
GLC Abolitionist Campaign	B. Stein			
Majority				
Turnout				

=== Greenwich ===
Greenwich
Party	Candidate	Votes	%	±%
Labour	Frederick William Styles			
Conservative	A R Milne			
National Front	Bridget Smoker			
Liberal	Anthony J W Renouf			
Fellowship	Ronald Stephen Mallone			
National Party	William David McCalden			
Majority				
Turnout				

Woolwich East
Party	Candidate	Votes	%	±%
Labour	Mair Eluned Garside*			
Conservative	MC Punyer			
National Front	Helena Mary Steven			
Liberal	Graham Howard Knight			
Communist	TA Bell			
National Party	Terence A Heath			
Majority				
Turnout				

Woolwich West
Party	Candidate	Votes	%	±%
Conservative	David Glynn Ashby			
Labour	Margaret Rees*			
Liberal	Mrs CB Fowl	2,401		
National Front	June Dunster			
National Party	D Simpson			
Majority				
Turnout				

=== Hackney ===
Hackney Central
Party	Candidate	Votes	%	±%
Labour	Ellis Simon Hillman*			
Conservative	Kenneth Sydney Lightwood			
National Front	Robin May			
Liberal	P. C. Asbury-Smith			
Communist	D. McNeil			
Majority				
Turnout				

Hackney North & Stoke Newington
Party	Candidate	Votes	%	±%
Labour	Kenneth Robert Livingstone			
Conservative	Leslie R. House			
National Front	Sylvia May			
Liberal	Maurice S Owen			
Communist	Monty Goldman			
Majority				
Turnout				

Hackney South & Shoreditch
Party	Candidate	Votes	%	±%
Labour	Joan Margaret Morgan			
Conservative	Clive St George Clement Stanbrook			
National Front	David James Bruce			
Liberal	Jeffrey David Roberts			
Independent Liberal	David 'Dick' Hains			
Majority				
Turnout				

=== Hammersmith ===
Fulham
Party	Candidate	Votes	%	±%
Conservative	John Charles Putnam			
Labour	Mary-Lou Clarke			
Liberal	Cyril J Barnes			
National Front	David Sturman			
Independent	C. B. Delpech			
Majority				
Turnout				

Hammersmith North
Party	Candidate	Votes	%	±%
Conservative	William Christopher Smith			
Labour	Iris Mary Caroline Bonham*			
Liberal	Margaret A. Connaughton			
National Front	Alistair I S Cameron			
GLC Abolitionist Campaign	S. B. Fry			
Majority				
Turnout				

=== Haringey ===
Hornsey
Party	Candidate	Votes	%	±%
Conservative	Lawrence Arthur Bains*			
Labour	Charles L Silverstone			
Liberal	Francis A Coleman			
National Front	Bruce W Pell			
Majority				
Turnout				

Tottenham
Party	Candidate	Votes	%	±%
Labour	Andrew Robert McIntosh*	7,543		
Conservative	P. E. Hitchens	5,845		
National Front	PG Holden	1,628		
Liberal	Katherine Alexander	756		
National Party	Miss PI Goldfield	333		
Majority				
Turnout				

Wood Green
Party	Candidate	Votes	%	±%
Conservative	Jenefer Gwendolen Anne Riley			
Labour	Maureen Harwood			
National Front	Keith Squire			
Liberal	Mrs AD Viney			
NETCAT*	Denis Hawes			
National Party	Mrs J Lennox			
Majority				
Turnout				

- North East Tottenham Campaign Against Traffic

=== Harrow ===
Harrow Central
Party	Candidate	Votes	%	±%
Conservative	William Sydney Clack*			
Labour	Alfred H Elderton			
Liberal	Ralph Peter Bancroft			
National Front	Leslie Edward David Le Croissette			
Majority				
Turnout				

Harrow East
Party	Candidate	Votes	%	±%
Conservative	Harold Trevor Mote*			
Labour	Allen Bradshaw			
Liberal	Anthony Baker			
National Front	Geoffrey W. Spratt			
National Party	Alan J. Harding			
Communist	Reginald A. Ward			
Majority				
Turnout				

Harrow West
Party	Candidate	Votes	%	±%
Conservative	Horace Walter Cutler*			
Labour	Alan G. M. Kinchin			
Liberal	James S. S. Bond			
National Front	B. V. Maisey			
Majority				
Turnout				

=== Havering ===
Hornchurch
Party	Candidate	Votes	%	±%
Conservative	John Reveley Major			
Labour	Alexander Serge Lourie*			
Liberal	Mark Leonard Christopher Long			
National Front	Audrey Harris			
People	Benjamin Percy-Davis			
Majority				
Turnout				

Romford
Party	Candidate	Votes	%	±%
Conservative	Bernard Brook-Partridge			
Labour	Matthew J. Spencer			
Liberal	Pauline A. Longhorn			
National Front	Madeline Pauline V. Caine			
People	C. W. R. Goodwin			
Communist	Colin R. Harper			
Majority				
Turnout				

Upminster
Party	Candidate	Votes	%	±%
Conservative	Shelagh Marjorie Roberts*			
Labour	Ronald E Whitworth			
National Front	John Roberts			
Liberal	David J. Ingle			
Majority				
Turnout				

=== Hillingdon ===
Hayes & Harlington
Party	Candidate	Votes	%	±%
Conservative	Albert James Retter			
Labour	Peter Frank Norman Russell			
Liberal	Alan H Rowland			
National Front	John Stanley Fairhurst			
Communist	John C Mansfield			
National Party	F. Muter			
Majority				
Turnout				

Ruislip-Northwood
Party	Candidate	Votes	%	±%
Conservative	Cyril Julian Hebden Taylor			
Labour	Peter J Goody			
Liberal	A. G. Thomas			
National Front	Peter Marsh			
Majority				
Turnout				

Uxbridge
Party	Candidate	Votes	%	±%
Conservative	James Anthony Lemkin*			
Labour	Louis Sherman			
Liberal	Brian Outhwaite			
National Front	Penelope A Bugden			
National Party	Joseph F De Ville			
Majority				
Turnout				

=== Hounslow ===
Brentford & Isleworth
Party	Candidate	Votes	%	±%
Conservative	Andrew Jardine			
Labour	James Daly*			
Liberal	Michael A. Simmons			
National Front	Peter James Attridge			
National Party	Ronald W. Coker			
GLC Abolitionist Campaign	M. J. Taylor			
Independent Liberal	M. E. Ferguson			
Majority				
Turnout				

Feltham & Heston
Party	Candidate	Votes	%	±%
Conservative	Ronald Dennis Mitchell			
Labour	Anthony Louis Banks			
National Front	Josephine Mary Reid			
Liberal	Charles W. Baily			
Independent Liberal	E. J. Connolly			
National Party	James F. Wood			
GLC Abolitionist Campaign	C. R. Bex			
Majority				
Turnout				

=== Islington ===
Islington Central
Party	Candidate	Votes	%	±%
Labour	Simon John Turney			
Conservative	Arthur Horace Sydney Hull			
National Front	Sidney Albert Chaney			
Liberal	Margot Joan Dunn			
Majority				
Turnout				

Islington North
Party	Candidate	Votes	%	±%
Labour	Louis Wolfgang Bondy*			
Conservative	Jonathan Sayeed			
National Front	Graham P Southern			
Liberal	Patrick William O'Brien			
International Marxist	Michael A Sullivan			
Majority				
Turnout				

Islington South & Finsbury
Party	Candidate	Votes	%	±%
Labour	Arthur Ernest Wicks*			
Conservative	CI Price			
National Front	Paul Terence Kavanagh			
Liberal	Antony John Dean			
Communist	Edward C Archer			
Majority				
Turnout				

=== Kensington and Chelsea ===
Chelsea
Party	Candidate	Votes	%	±%
Conservative	William Archibald Ottley Juxon Bell*			
Labour	R. A. Banton			
Liberal	Peter George Driver			
GLC Abolitionist Campaign	Oliver Piers Stutchbury			
National Front	E. V. French			
Majority				
Turnout				

Kensington
Party	Candidate	Votes	%	±%
Conservative	Robert Louis Vigars*			
Labour	Patrick A Sweeney			
Liberal	Doreen Marjorie Gorsky			
National Front	E. G. Martin			
Communist	Edward S. Adams			
GLC Abolitionist Campaign	R. Fuchs			
English National	Leonard E Green			
Majority				
Turnout				

=== Kingston upon Thames ===
Kingston upon Thames
Party	Candidate	Votes	%	±%
Conservative	Sydney William Leonard Ripley*			
Labour	Mrs Audrey M Barker			
Liberal	Jean Godden			
National Front	DM Foster			
Communist	DE Wilson			
GLC Abolitionist Campaign	Miss PELM Russell			
Majority				
Turnout				

Surbiton
Party	Candidate	Votes	%	±%
Conservative	Geoffrey John David Seaton*			
Labour	Colin P Moore			
Liberal	John L. Tilley			
National Front	James Sawyer			
GLC Abolitionist Campaign	Thomas W Benford			
Majority				
Turnout				

=== Lambeth ===
Lambeth Central
Party	Candidate	Votes	%	±%
Labour	Anna Lloyd Grieves*			
Conservative	Raymond George Hatter			
National Front	Kathleen Mott			
Liberal	William A. J. Bennett			
International Marxist	Piers Richard Corbyn			
Communist	S. G. Hope			
Socialist (GB)	H. G. Baldwin			
Independent	William George Boaks			
Majority				
Turnout				

Norwood
Party	Candidate	Votes	%	±%
Conservative	Norman John David Smith			
Labour	Edward Robert Knight			
National Front	T. A. Mitchell			
Liberal	David John Charlesworth			
GLC Abolitionist Campaign	I. T. Roberts			
Majority				
Turnout				

Streatham
Party	Candidate	Votes	%	±%
Conservative	Frederick Walter Weyer			
Labour	D. J. Dahl			
Liberal	A. J. Mould			
National Front	Vera Florence Lillington			
GLC Abolitionist Campaign	P. J. Moncrieff			
Majority				
Turnout				

Vauxhall
Party	Candidate	Votes	%	±%
Labour	Ewan Geddes Carr*			
Conservative	Clive W. Jones			
National Front	Colin P. K. Skeats			
Liberal	William F. Brown			
GLC Abolitionist Campaign	D. T. Riley			
Majority				
Turnout				

=== Lewisham ===
Deptford
Party	Candidate	Votes	%	±%
Labour	David Walter Chalkley*			
Conservative	J. R. S. Egerton			
National Party	Malcolm L Dixon			
National Front	Richard Charles Edmonds			
Liberal	F. G. Wise			
Majority				
Turnout				

Lewisham East
Party	Candidate	Votes	%	±%
Conservative	Sonia Copland			
Labour	John Charles Henry*			
Liberal	J Spicer			
National Front	Michael T Ashmore			
Communist	Michael Power			
National Party	A. H. Whitmore			
Majority				
Turnout				

Lewisham West
Party	Candidate	Votes	%	±%
Conservative	Roger Eden Hiskey			
Labour	William Colbert Simson*			
National Front	Leigh J Taylor			
Liberal	James Douglas Eagle			
Communist	M H Robinson			
National Party	Sydney G Avis			
GLC Abolitionist Campaign	B. M. Smoker			
Majority				
Turnout				

=== Merton ===
Mitcham & Morden
Party	Candidate	Votes	%	±%
Conservative	Brian Joseph Shenton			
Labour	Anthony Robert Judge*			
Liberal	Desmond J Stockley			
National Front	Anthony Francis Bailey			
Sales Representative	JFF Rooks			
GLC Abolitionist Campaign	G Burt			
Majority				
Turnout				

Wimbledon
Party	Candidate	Votes	%	±%
Conservative	Stanley Charles Bolton*			
Labour	Rock Benedict Tansey			
Liberal	Ronald Arthur Locke			
National Front	G Renelt			
GLC Abolitionist Campaign	JH Brewer			
Independent	CJ Ward			
Majority				
Turnout				

=== Newham ===
Newham North East
Party	Candidate	Votes	%	±%
Labour	John Wilson			
Conservative	Damian P J Sutton			
National Front	Michael J. Salt			
Majority				
Turnout				

Newham North West
Party	Candidate	Votes	%	±%
Labour	Arthur Frank George Edwards*			
Conservative	David Anthony Andrew Amess			
National Front	Carol A Armond			
Liberal	Brian George McCarthy			
Majority				
Turnout				

Newham South
Party	Candidate	Votes	%	±%
Labour	Edward Percy Bell*			
Conservative	Nicholas A M Thompson			
National Front	Viola Roberts			
Liberal	Rif Winfield			
Communist	R. A. Offley			
Majority				
Turnout				

=== Redbridge ===
Ilford North
Party	Candidate	Votes	%	±%
Conservative	Marion Audrey Roe			
Labour	Timothy J. Ridoutt*			
Liberal	Jonathan B Freeman			
National Front	JP Clarke			
Majority				
Turnout				

Ilford South
Party	Candidate	Votes	%	±%
Conservative	Arnold Kinzley			
Labour	Dennis Annesley Carradice*			
Liberal	Stephen Toper			
National Front	DF Street			
Majority				
Turnout				

Wanstead & Woodford
Party	Candidate	Votes	%	±%
Conservative	Robert Mitchell*			
Labour	Denise Liunberg			
Liberal	Richard Hugh Hoskins			
National Front	Mrs YF Grosvenor			
Majority				
Turnout				

=== Richmond upon Thames ===
Richmond
Party	Candidate	Votes	%	±%
Conservative	Edward Julian Egerton Leigh			
Liberal	Alison M Cornish			
Labour	Anthony Bernard Hart			
National Front	John Harrison-Broadley			
GLC Abolitionist Campaign	A. Billingham			
Majority				
Turnout				

Twickenham
Party	Candidate	Votes	%	±%
Conservative	George William Tremlett*			
Liberal	John P. M. Rowlands			
Labour	A. S. Proud			
National Front	Derek E Ware			
GLC Abolitionist Campaign	H. K. Black			
Majority				
Turnout				

=== Southwark ===
Bermondsey
Party	Candidate	Votes	%	±%
Labour	Reginald Eustace Goodwin*			
Conservative	Alexander Agim Duma			
National Front	James Stephen Sneath			
Liberal	R. A Sandford			
Communist	R. Gordon			
National Party	L. E. Clifford			
Majority				
Turnout				

Dulwich
Party	Candidate	Votes	%	±%
Conservative	Gerald Francis Bowden			
Labour	Richard Andrew Balfe*			
Liberal	Jonathan Nigel Hunt			
National Front	David Thompson			
Communist	Eric L. Hodson			
National Party	Edward H Arthurton			
Majority				
Turnout				

Peckham
Party	Candidate	Votes	%	±%
Labour	Harvey William Hinds*			
Conservative	Andrew Searle Dalton			
National Front	John Robert Perryman			
National Party	Ronald A W Jackson			
Liberal	Terence John Minahan			
Majority				
Turnout				

=== Sutton ===
Carshalton
Party	Candidate	Votes	%	±%
Conservative	Robert Gwilym Lewis-Jones			
Labour	Phillip John Bassett*			
Liberal	John Hatherley			
National Front	Denis V. Horton			
GLC Abolitionist Campaign	David J Rogers			
Majority				
Turnout				

Sutton and Cheam
Party	Candidate	Votes	%	±%
Conservative	Muriel Gumbel			
Liberal	Ruth Mary Shaw			
Labour	John K Evers			
National Front	John E Hunt			
Majority				
Turnout				

=== Tower Hamlets ===
Bethnal Green and Bow
Party	Candidate	Votes	%	±%
Labour	Ernest Ashley Bramall*			
Conservative	John O'Beirne Ranelagh			
National Front	Walter Edward Castleton			
International Marxist	C. M. B. Weingarten			
GLC Abolitionist Campaign	G. Lewis			
Majority				
Turnout				

Stepney & Poplar
Party	Candidate	Votes	%	±%
Labour	John Patrick Branagan*			
Conservative	Selwyn P Williams			
National Front	Frank C Berry			
Liberal	Maurice Caplan			
Communist	Max Samuel Levitas			
GLC Abolitionist Campaign	M. I. Macdonald			
Majority				
Turnout				

=== Waltham Forest ===
Chingford
Party	Candidate	Votes	%	±%
Conservative	Richard Maddock Brew*			
Labour	Michael A Killingworth			
National Front	Doreen M South			
Liberal	Henry A Boyle			
Majority				
Turnout				

Leyton
Party	Candidate	Votes	%	±%
Conservative	Waldemar Thor Neilson-Hansen			
Labour	John James Walsh*			
National Front	Norman Arthur Lyons			
Liberal	John G Williams			
Communist	John Arthur Courcouf			
Majority				
Turnout				

Walthamstow
Party	Candidate	Votes	%	±%
Labour	Robin Ainsworth Raine Young*			
Conservative	Gerald A King			
National Front	James R Childs			
Liberal	Mervyn Peter O'Flanagan			
Majority				
Turnout				

=== Wandsworth ===
Battersea North
Party	Candidate	Votes	%	±%
Labour	Gladys Felicia Dimson*			
Conservative	Andrew R Jackson			
National Front	Gary J Acres			
Liberal	James G. Caple			
Majority				
Turnout				

Battersea South
Party	Candidate	Votes	%	±%
Conservative	Margaret Williams			
Labour	Michael Ward			
Liberal	R. Lewis			
National Front	Rodney A Noyce			
GLC Abolitionist Campaign	J. M. Burroughes			
Majority				
Turnout				

Putney
Party	Candidate	Votes	%	±%
Conservative	John Leonard Harris			
Labour	G. Dyke			
Liberal	John Horrocks			
National Front	Christopher J Lewis			
Communist	David J Welsh			
GLC Abolitionist Campaign	J. E. Juszt			
Majority				
Turnout				

Tooting
Party	Candidate	Votes	%	±%
Conservative	Thomas Alfred Leefe Ham			
Labour	Lilias Girdwood Gillies*			
Liberal	Richard Ian MacDuff Fife			
National Front	Douglas L Simons			
Communist	Robert E. Lewis			
Majority				
Turnout				

=== Westminster and the City of London ===
City of London & Westminster South
Party	Candidate	Votes	%	±%
Conservative	Mervyn Nelson Scorgie*			
Labour	Philip John Turner			
Liberal	Angus M E Scrimgeour			
GLC Abolitionist Campaign	A. M. Moncreiff			
National Front	S. Attree			
New Britain	Mrs S. Attkins			
Majority				
Turnout				

Paddington
Party	Candidate	Votes	%	±%
Conservative	Patricia Mary Kirwan			
Labour	Jean Merriton*			
National Front	Robert A Martin			
Liberal	Zigurds Guntis Kronbergs			
GLC Abolitionist Campaign	H. M. Lye			
Majority				
Turnout				

St Marylebone
Party	Candidate	Votes	%	±%
Conservative	Herbert Henry Sandford*	10359		
Labour	Ian J C Peddie	3468		
Liberal	P R Vandekar	645		
National Front	Charles Elrick	372		
Ecology	Jonathon Espie Porritt	298		
Socialist (GB)	James D'Arcy	102		
Co-operative Housing	B D Lake	67		
Majority				
Turnout				
