= Chipping Barnet (electoral division) =

Electoral division in Greater London, 1973–1986

- Former electoral division for the Greater London Council
- Chipping Barnet electoral division boundaries
- District: Barnet
- Electorate: 56,764 (1973); 58,382 (1977); 57,958 (1981)
- Major settlements: Chipping Barnet
- Area: 3,115 hectares (31.15 km^{2})

Former electoral division
- Created: 1973
- Abolished: 1986
- Member: 1
- Created from: Barnet

Chipping Barnet was an electoral division for the purposes of elections to the Greater London Council. The constituency elected one councillor for a four-year term in 1973, 1977 and 1981, with the final term extended for an extra year ahead of the abolition of the Greater London Council.

== History ==
It was planned to use the same boundaries as the Westminster Parliament constituencies for election of councillors to the Greater London Council (GLC), as had been the practice for elections to the predecessor London County Council, but those that existed in 1965 crossed the Greater London boundary. Until new constituencies could be settled, the 32 London boroughs were used as electoral areas. The London Borough of Barnet formed the Barnet electoral division. This was used for the Greater London Council elections in 1964, 1967 and 1970.

The new constituencies were settled following the Second Periodic Review of Westminster constituencies and the new electoral division matched the boundaries of the Chipping Barnet parliamentary constituency.

It covered an area of 3,115 hectares (31.15 km^{2}).

== Elections ==
The Chipping Barnet constituency was used for the Greater London Council elections in 1973, 1977 and 1981. One councillor was elected at each election using first-past-the-post voting.

=== 1973 election ===
The fourth election to the GLC (and first using revised boundaries) was held on 12 April 1973. The electorate was 56,764 and one Conservative Party councillor was elected. The turnout was 37.9%. The councillor was elected for a three-year term. This was extended for an extra year in 1976 when the electoral cycle was switched to four-yearly.

1973 Greater London Council election: Chipping Barnet
Party	Candidate	Votes	%	±%
Conservative	Reginald Marks	10,753	49.99	
Labour	H. Sprague	6,035	28.06	
Liberal	Margaret Gelling Snow	4,727	21.96	
Turnout				
Conservative win (new seat)				

=== 1977 election ===
The fifth election to the GLC (and second using revised boundaries) was held on 5 May 1977. The electorate was 58,382 and one Conservative Party councillor was elected. The turnout was 44.1%. The councillor was elected for a four-year term.

1977 Greater London Council election: Chipping Barnet
Party	Candidate	Votes	%	±%
Conservative	Mark Jonathan David Damian Lister Patterson	17,095	66.39	
Labour	Geoffrey N. Cooke	5,171	20.09	
Liberal	David H. Ive	2,491	9.67	
National Front	Daniel J. Monk	989	3.84	
Turnout				
Conservative hold		Swing		

=== 1981 election ===
The sixth and final election to the GLC (and third using revised boundaries) was held on 7 May 1981. The electorate was 57,958 and one Conservative Party councillor was elected. The turnout was 40.8%. The councillor was elected for a four-year term, extended by an extra year by the Local Government (Interim Provisions) Act 1984, ahead of the abolition of the council.

1981 Greater London Council election: Chipping Barnet
Party	Candidate	Votes	%	±%
Conservative	John Reveley Major	13,056	55.14	
Labour	Steven L. Powell	5,754	24.30	
Liberal	Jean W. Hawkins	4,003	16.91	
Ecology	Timothy H. Cooper	859	3.63	
Turnout				
Conservative hold		Swing		

John Reveley Major stood and won the Hornchurch seat at the 1977 election.
