= Camden (electoral division) =

Electoral division in Greater London, 1965–1973

- Former electoral division for the Greater London Council
- Camden electoral division boundaries
- District: London Borough of Camden
- Population: 228,080 (1969 estimate)
- Electorate: 165,118 (1964); 160,864 (1967); 163,572 (1970)
- Area: 5,364.7 acres (21.710 km^{2})

Former electoral division
- Created: 1965
- Abolished: 1973
- Member(s): 3
- Replaced by: Hampstead, Holborn and St Pancras South and St Pancras North

Camden was an electoral division for the purposes of elections to the Greater London Council. The constituency elected three councillors for a three-year term in 1964, 1967 and 1970.

== History ==
It was planned to use the same boundaries as the Westminster Parliament constituencies for election of councillors to the Greater London Council (GLC), as had been the practice for elections to the predecessor London County Council, but those that existed in 1965 crossed the Greater London boundary. Until new constituencies could be settled, the 32 London boroughs were used as electoral areas which therefore created a constituency called Camden.

The electoral division was replaced from 1973 by the single-member electoral divisions of Hampstead, Holborn and St Pancras South and St Pancras North.

== Elections ==
The Camden constituency was used for the Greater London Council elections in 1964, 1967 and 1970. Three councillors were elected at each election using first-past-the-post voting.

=== 1964 election ===
The first election was held on 9 April 1964, a year before the council came into its powers. The electorate was 165,118 and three Labour Party councillors were elected. With 74,818 people voting, the turnout was 45.3%. The councillors were elected for a three-year term.

1964 Greater London Council election: Camden
Party	Candidate	Votes	%	±%
Labour	Leila Campbell	38,198		
Labour	Louis Wolfgang Bondy	38,191		
Labour	Evelyn Joyce Denington	37,364		
Conservative	F. E. H. Bennett	30,096		
Conservative	Lena Moncrieff Townsend	28,723		
Conservative	Isita Clare Mansel	28,588		
Liberal	A. J. F. Macdonald	4,839		
Liberal	J. M. Arram	4,614		
Liberal	M. S. Watson	4,087		
Communist	J. Nicolson	2,875		
Independent	B. W. Haines	1,016		
Turnout				
Labour win (new seat)				
Labour win (new seat)				
Labour win (new seat)				

=== 1967 election ===
The second election was held on 13 April 1967. The electorate was 160,864 and three Conservative Party councillors were elected. With 67,553 people voting, the turnout was 42.0%. The councillors were elected for a three-year term.

1967 Greater London Council election: Camden
Party	Candidate	Votes	%	±%
Conservative	Richard Brownrigg Butterfield	32,375		
Conservative	Lena Moncrieff Townsend	32,216		
Conservative	Isita Clare Mansel	31,587		
Labour	Luke Patrick O'Connor	28,504		
Labour	Leila Campbell	27,923		
Labour	Louis Wolfgang Bondy	27,284		
Liberal	G. H. Willett	4,911		
Liberal	A. G. Bevan	4,269		
Liberal	A. F. Cook	4,187		
Communist	J. Nicolson	2,133		
Socialist (GB)	W. Buchanan	907		
Socialist (GB)	E. S. Grant	419		
Socialist (GB)	T. E. Giles	411		
Turnout				
Conservative gain from Labour		Swing		
Conservative gain from Labour		Swing		
Conservative gain from Labour		Swing		

=== 1970 election ===
The third election was held on 9 April 1970. The electorate was 163,572 and three Labour Party councillors were elected. With 56,109 people voting, the turnout was 34.3%. The councillors were elected for a three-year term.

1970 Greater London Council election: Camden
Party	Candidate	Votes	%	±%
Labour	Luke Patrick O'Connor	26,265		
Labour	Richard Collins	26,140		
Labour	Alexander John Kazantzis	25,731		
Conservative	James Anthony Lemkin	24,416		
Conservative	Lena Moncrieff Townsend	24,416		
Conservative	Isita Clare Mansel	24,047		
Liberal	J. Calmann	2,565		
Liberal	K. J. Peacock	2,252		
Liberal	R. A. P. Benad	2,208		
Communist	G. McLennan	1,692		
Homes before Roads	R. A. Peacock	1,311		
Homes before Roads	W. E. Walker	1,249		
Homes before Roads	C. K. Jacka	1,037		
Socialist (GB)	L. J. Cox	391		
Socialist (GB)	D. R. M. Davies	323		
Socialist (GB)	E. S. Grant	299		
Union Movement	F. Elliott	195		
Turnout				
Labour gain from Conservative		Swing		
Labour gain from Conservative		Swing		
Labour gain from Conservative		Swing		
