= Barnet (electoral division) =

Electoral division in Greater London, 1965–1973

- Former electoral division for the Greater London Council
- Barnet electoral division boundaries
- District: London Borough of Barnet
- Population: 314,530 (1969 estimate)
- Electorate: 217,308 (1964); 217,344 (1967); 231,351 (1970); 219,084 (1972)
- Area: 22,123.8 acres (89.532 km^{2})

Former electoral division
- Created: 1965
- Abolished: 1973
- Member: 4
- Replaced by: Chipping Barnet, Finchley, Hendon North and Hendon South

Barnet was an electoral division for the purposes of elections to the Greater London Council. The constituency elected four councillors for a three-year term in 1964, 1967 and 1970.

== History ==
It was planned to use the same boundaries as the Westminster Parliament constituencies for election of councillors to the Greater London Council (GLC), as had been the practice for elections to the predecessor London County Council, but those that existed in 1965 crossed the Greater London boundary. Until new constituencies could be settled, the 32 London boroughs were used as electoral areas which therefore created a constituency called Barnet.

The electoral division was replaced from 1973 by the single-member electoral divisions of Chipping Barnet, Finchley, Hendon North and Hendon South.

== Elections ==
The Barnet constituency was used for the Greater London Council elections in 1964, 1967 and 1970. Four councillors were elected at each election using first-past-the-post voting.

=== 1964 election ===
The first election was held on 9 April 1964, a year before the council came into its powers. The electorate was 217,308 and four Conservative Party councillors were elected. With 117,003 people voting, the turnout was 53.8%. The councillors were elected for a three-year term.

1964 Greater London Council election: Barnet
Party	Candidate	Votes	%	±%
Conservative	Peter Blair Black	52,807		
Conservative	Jean Leslie Scott	51,939		
Conservative	Joseph Henry Haygarth	51,612		
Conservative	Reginald Marks	51,053		
Labour	N. Birch	34,303		
Labour	B. R. Scharf	33,230		
Labour	C. H. F. Reynolds	32,212		
Labour	F. B. Groves	31,538		
Liberal	J. Webb	25,496		
Liberal	M. Medway	25,463		
Liberal	P. H. Billenness	24,209		
Liberal	O. C. Williams	24,104		
Communist	R. T. Gooding	4,308		
Communist	J. W. Pinder	3,409		
Turnout				
Conservative win (new seat)				
Conservative win (new seat)				
Conservative win (new seat)				
Conservative win (new seat)				

=== 1967 election ===
The second election was held on 13 April 1967. The electorate was 217,344 and four Conservative Party councillors were elected. With 101,905 people voting, the turnout was 46.9 %. The councillors were elected for a three-year term.

1967 Greater London Council election: Barnet
Party	Candidate	Votes	%	±%
Conservative	Reginald Marks	58,697		
Conservative	Peter Blair Black	58,235		
Conservative	Jean Leslie Scott	57,666		
Conservative	Arthur Sidney Peacock	57,011		
Labour	B. R. Scharf	24,136		
Labour	A. E. Tomlinson	23,520		
Labour	T. J. K. Sims	22,536		
Labour	B. S. Warman	21,735		
Liberal	P. H. Billenness	15,626		
Liberal	C. A. Roberts	14,346		
Liberal	P. W. Meyer	14,297		
Liberal	D. T. Baron	14,281		
Communist	A. B. Beyer	3,342		
Union Movement	A. E. Brown	2,719		
Communist	J. W. Pinder	2,216		
Turnout				
Conservative hold		Swing		
Conservative hold		Swing		
Conservative hold		Swing		
Conservative hold		Swing		

=== 1970 election ===
The third election was held on 9 April 1970. The electorate was 231,351 and four Conservative Party councillors were elected. With 83,144 people voting, the turnout was 35.9%. The councillors were elected for a three-year term.

1970 Greater London Council election: Barnet
Party	Candidate	Votes	%	±%
Conservative	Peter Blair Black	50,021		
Conservative	Reginald Marks	49,440		
Conservative	Jean Leslie Scott	49,410		
Conservative	Arthur Sidney Peacock	49,224		
Labour	J. W. Buck	20,006		
Labour	D. H. T. Hammond	19,931		
Labour	R. Robinson	19,825		
Labour	P. Stephenson	19,100		
Liberal	M. G. Cass	10,042		
Liberal	M. G. Snow	9,707		
Liberal	M. E. Palmer	9,460		
Liberal	L. W. Watkins	9,163		
Homes before Roads	D. M. Luck	1,352		
Communist	J. W. Pinder	1,256		
Homes before Roads	A. Aarons	1,156		
Communist	G. T. G. Jeffrey	1,145		
Homes before Roads	E. C. Foley	1,145		
Homes before Roads	J. A. Wonham	739		
Union Movement	A. E. G. White	307		
Turnout				
Conservative hold		Swing		
Conservative hold		Swing		
Conservative hold		Swing		
Conservative hold		Swing		

=== 1972 by-election ===
A by-election was held on 19 October 1972, following the death of Arthur Sidney Peacock. The electorate was 219,084 and one Conservative Party councillor was elected. With 20,813 voting, the turnout was 9.5%

Barnet by-election, 1972
Party	Candidate	Votes	%	±%
Conservative	Rita Maisie Levy	13,716		
Labour	A. E. Tomlinson	5,585		
Independent	F. Davis	1,512		
Turnout				
Conservative hold		Swing		
