= London Borough of Barnet =

Borough in the United Kingdom

Coordinates: 51.6254°N 0.1527°W

- London borough
- Coat of arms Council logo
- Motto(s): ‘’Unitas efficit ministerium‘’ (Unity accomplishes service)
- Barnet shown within Greater London
- Sovereign state: United Kingdom
- Constituent country: England
- Region: London
- Ceremonial county: Greater London
- Created: 1 April 1965
- Admin HQ: 2 Bristol Avenue, Colindale

Government
  - Type: London borough council
  - Body: Barnet London Borough Council
  - London Assembly: Anne Clarke (Lab) AM for Barnet and Camden

Area
  - Total: 33.49 sq mi (86.74 km^{2})
  - Rank: 207th (of 296)

Population (2024)
  - Total: 405,050
  - Rank: 19th (of 296)
  - Density: 12,090/sq mi (4,670/km^{2})
- Time zone: UTC (GMT)
  - Summer (DST): UTC+1 (BST)
- Postcodes: EN, N, NW, HA
- Area code: 020
- ISO 3166 code: GB-BNE
- ONS code: 00AC
- GSS code: E09000003
- Police: Metropolitan Police
- Website: www.barnet.gov.uk

The London Borough of Barnet (/ˈbɑːrnɪt/) is a suburban London borough in north London, England. Forming part of Outer London, the borough was formed in 1965 from parts of the ceremonial counties of Middlesex and Hertfordshire. It is one of London's two most populated boroughs (regularly alternating at number one, since 2000, with Croydon), with 405,050 inhabitants as of 2024, also making it England's 19th largest district that year. The borough covers an area of 86.74 square kilometres (33 sq mi), the fourth largest area of the 32 London boroughs, and has a population density of 46.7 people per hectare, which ranks it 25th.

Barnet borders the Hertfordshire district of Hertsmere to the north and five other London boroughs: Camden and Haringey to the southeast, Enfield to the east, as well as Harrow and Brent to the west of the ancient Watling Street (now the A5 road). The borough's major urban settlements are Hendon, Finchley, Golders Green, Friern Barnet, Chipping Barnet, Whetstone, and Edgware; there are also village settlements, notably Totteridge and Arkley, along with rural areas and countryside which forms part of the Green Belt.

The local authority is Barnet London Borough Council, which meets at Hendon Town Hall and has its main offices in Colindale.

== History ==
The area covered by the modern borough has a long history. Evidence of first-century Roman pottery manufacturing has been found at Brockley Hill and Roman coins from the third and fourth centuries were found at Burnt Oak. Both sites are on the Roman road Watling Street from London (Londinium) to St Albans (Verulamium) which now forms the western border of the borough.

Hendon is mentioned in the Domesday Book of 1086, but the districts of Barnet, Edgware and Finchley were not referred to, possibly because these areas were included in other manors.

In 1471 the Battle of Barnet was fought in Monken Hadley, just within the present borough's boundary. It was here that Yorkist troops led by King Edward IV killed the "Kingmaker" Richard Neville, Earl of Warwick and his brother, John Neville, 1st Marquess of Montagu.

=== Administrative history ===
A local government district called Barnet was created in 1863 covering the town of Barnet, also known as Chipping Barnet. Such districts were subsequently also created for East Barnet Valley in 1874, Finchley in 1878, Hendon in 1879, and Friern Barnet in 1883. Barnet and East Barnet Valley both straddled Hertfordshire and Middlesex until 1889 when they were placed entirely in Hertfordshire; Hendon, Finchley and Friern Barnet were all in Middlesex.

All five districts were converted into urban districts under the Local Government Act 1894. Barnet was enlarged in 1914 to take in Totteridge, and Hendon was enlarged in 1931 to take in Edgware. Hendon was made a municipal borough in 1932, as was Finchley in 1933. East Barnet Valley was renamed East Barnet in 1935.

The modern borough was created in 1965 under the London Government Act 1963, covering the combined area of the former boroughs of Finchley and Hendon and urban districts of Barnet, East Barnet and Friern Barnet. The area was transferred from Middlesex and Hertfordshire to Greater London, to become one of the 32 London boroughs.

The 1963 Act did not include a name for the new borough. A joint committee of the councils due to be amalgamated suggested "Northgate" or "Northern Heights". Keith Joseph, the Minister of Housing and Local Government, eventually chose Barnet. The place name Barnet is derived from the Old English bærnet meaning "land cleared by burning". The old Barnet Urban District had been the least populous of the five predecessor districts at the 1961 census; nearly half the new borough's population lived in the old borough of Hendon.

When the present borough was created, it included part of Elstree. On 1 April 1993 Barnet's northern boundary was altered and some of its more rural northern parts, including Elstree, were transferred to Hertfordshire (and its district of Hertsmere).

== Governance ==
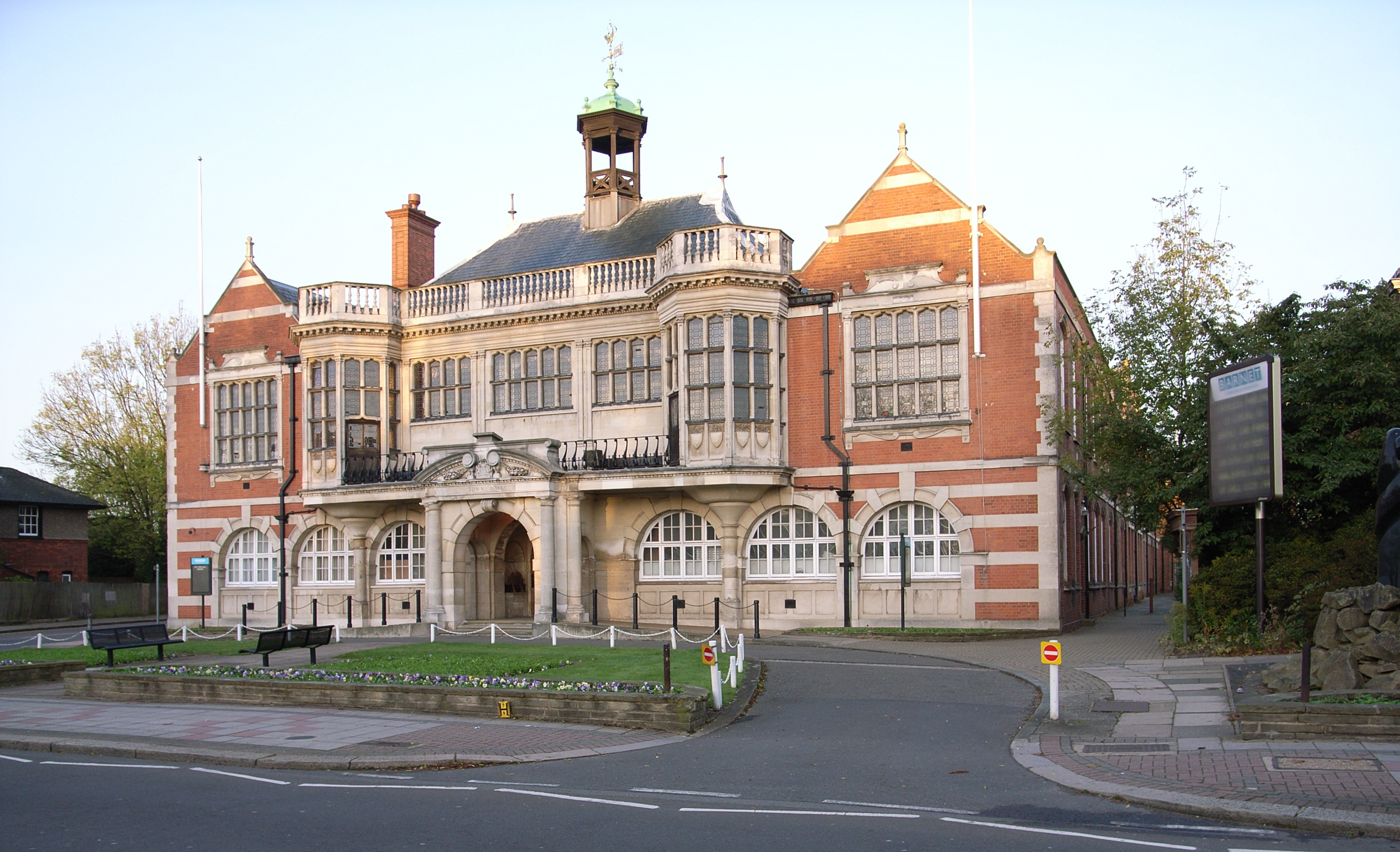
Hendon Town Hall, meeting place of Barnet Council

The local authority is Barnet Council, which meets at Hendon Town Hall and has its main offices at 2 Bristol Avenue in the Colindale area of the borough.

=== Greater London representation ===
For elections to the Greater London Council, the borough formed the Barnet electoral division, electing four members. In 1973 it was divided into the single-member Chipping Barnet, Finchley, Hendon North and Hendon South. The Greater London Council was abolished in 1986.

Since 2000, Barnet Council along with the 31 other London boroughs and the City of London Corporation share local government powers with Greater London Authority. The Barnet and Camden London Assembly constituency covers the London Borough of Barnet and the London Borough of Camden and is represented on the London Assembly by one constituency Assembly Member.

| Year | Member | Party |
|---|---|---|
| 2000 | Brian Coleman | Conservative |
| 2012 | Andrew Dismore | Labour |
| 2021 | Anne Clarke | Labour |

=== Parliamentary constituencies ===
The residents of London Borough of Barnet are represented at Westminster by Members of Parliament (MPs) for three parliamentary constituencies. All three MPs are represented by Labour since 2024, overturning three previous Conservative MPs.

Chipping Barnet is represented by Dan Tomlinson. Finchley and Golders Green is represented by Sarah Sackman. Hendon, in 2024 the most marginal Labour-held seat in the country with a majority of 15 votes, is represented by David Pinto-Duschinsky.

== Geography ==
London Borough of Barnet

Climate chart (precipitation, max. and min. temperature)
| J | F | M | A | M | J | J | A | S | O | N | D |
| 70 6 1 | 47 7 1 | 54 10 2 | 53 12 4 | 50 16 6 | 60 19 9 | 41 21 11 | 54 21 11 | 61 18 10 | 74 14 7 | 66 9 3 | 68 7 2 |
- █ Average max. and min. temperatures in °C
- █ Precipitation totals in mm
- Source: Records and averages, Yahoo! Weather, 2010, archived from the original on 8 June 2011
Imperial conversion
| J | F | M | A | M | J | J | A | S | O | N | D |
| 2.7 43 34 | 1.9 45 34 | 2.1 50 36 | 2.1 54 39 | 2 61 43 | 2.4 66 48 | 1.6 70 52 | 2.1 70 52 | 2.4 64 50 | 2.9 57 45 | 2.6 48 37 | 2.7 45 36 |
- █ Average max. and min. temperatures in °F
- █ Precipitation totals in inches

Location map for Barnet

The borough covers a group of hills on the northern edge of the London Basin. The bedrock is chalk which is covered with clay. Some of the hills are formed from glacial till deposited at the farthest extent of glaciers during the Anglian glaciation.

The pattern of settlement is somewhat diverse.

In the north of the borough on the eastern side is Barnet, also known as High Barnet or Chipping Barnet, Totteridge, and Whetstone. In the north on the western side is Edgware and Mill Hill. The central northern part of the borough is largely countryside. This division is largely because the eastern side grew around what is now the High Barnet Underground branch of the Northern line. The western side grew around the Midland Railway and what is now the Edgware branch of the Northern line.

Further south, around the borough's centre, the development becomes steadily more intensive around the suburbs of Cricklewood, Colindale, Hendon and Finchley. Golders Green is renowned for its Jewish minority ethnic population and forms part of the south of the borough, along with Hampstead Garden Suburb and Childs Hill.

Much of the borough is within the Metropolitan Green Belt, and it has many parks and open spaces. In addition there are large areas taken over by cemeteries and golf courses, and part of Hampstead Heath, Hampstead Heath Extension and Golders Hill Park. Barnet describes its 16 main open spaces as 'premier parks', nine of which achieved a Green Flag Award for 2008–2009:

The borough has sixty-seven Sites of Importance for Nature Conservation, eight Local Nature Reserves, and it is jointly responsible with the London Borough of Brent for the Welsh Harp (Brent) Reservoir, which is a Site of Special Scientific Interest. These are listed in Nature reserves in Barnet.

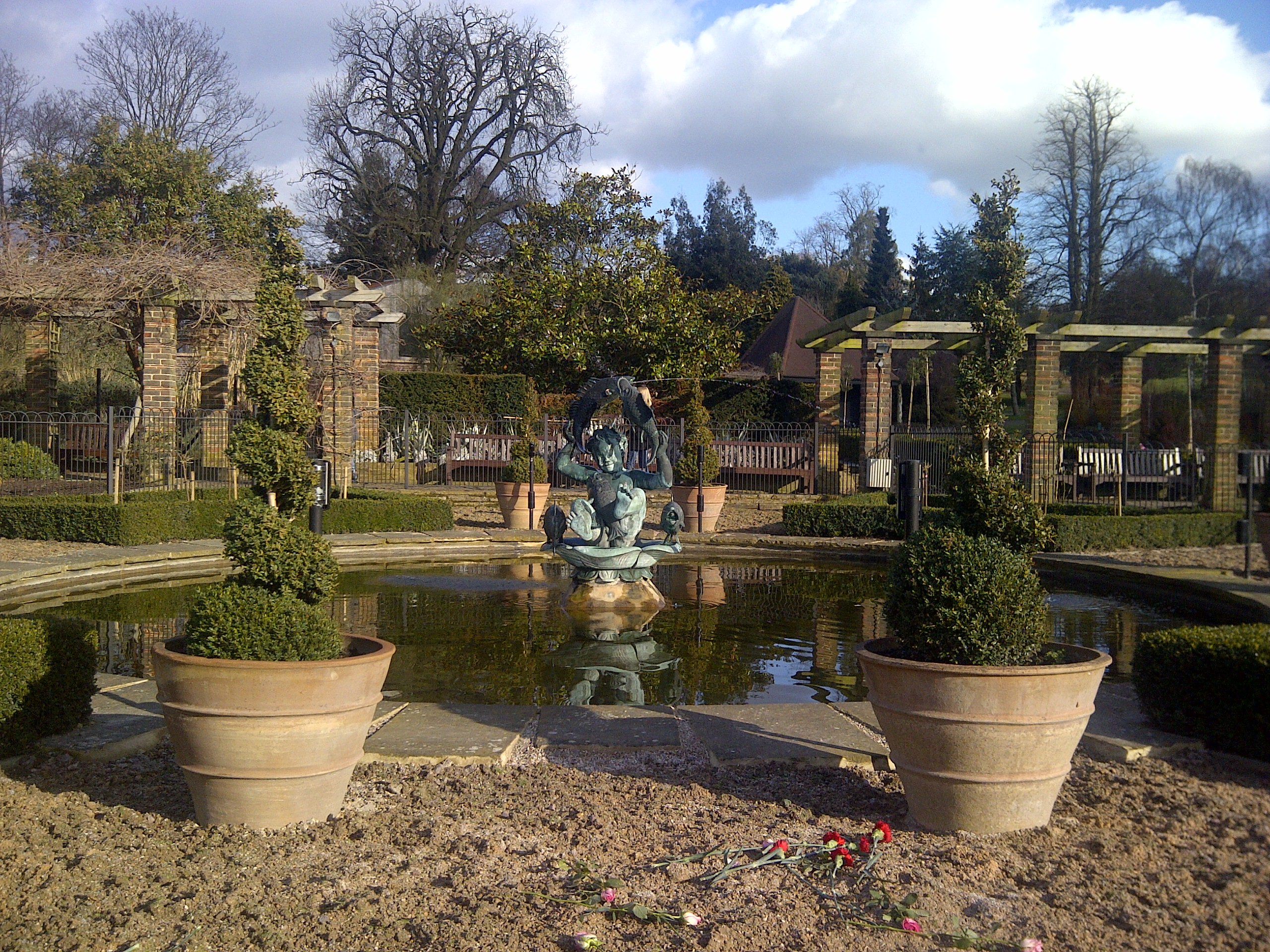
Golders Hill Park in Barnet

The A5 (Edgware Road) forms the border between Barnet and the boroughs of Brent and Harrow, with an exception being the West Hendon area and part of the Welsh Harp.

== Landmarks ==
Barnet has two Grade I listed buildings, both designed by Edwin Lutyens: the Church of St Jude, the parish church of Hampstead Garden Suburb with a Gothic spire and on the opposite side of Central Square, the Free Church, of similar design but with a concrete dome.

Odeon Cinema, Barnet is a Grade II listed building located on Great North Road.

The Royal Air Force Museum is a large multi-building museum built on part of the site of Hendon Aerodrome, dedicated to the history of aviation, and the British Royal Air Force in particular.

Church Farmhouse Museum in Greyhound Hill in Hendon is a grade II* listed 17th-century farmhouse used by Barnet Council as an exhibition space and museum until the Council closed it to save money on 31 March 2011. Early in 2014 it was given the classification of "vulnerable" by English Heritage after having stood abandoned for almost three years. It now houses units of Middlesex University.

Friern Hospital, located in Friern Barnet, was a large Victorian psychiatric hospital, which has since been converted into flats.

== Sport ==
The borough is traditionally home to a professional football club, Barnet F.C. and non-League football clubs Wingate & Finchley F.C., Hendon F.C., London Lions and Edgware Town. Wingate is the last of these with a home ground in the Borough; Hendon and Edgware play in the Borough of Brent, and Barnet F.C. play in the Borough of Harrow. Barnet is also home to the Barnet Nightingales Girls Football Club and Barnet Judo Club.

Since 2013 rugby union Premiership outfit Saracens F.C. have called the borough home, playing matches at StoneX Stadium at Barnet Copthall which was previously a community sports stadium and is still used in this capacity thanks to Saracens using movable stands for their matches. As well as athletics facilities, the complex also has a swimming pool.

== Demographics ==
Population pyramid of Barnet in 2021

Population
| Year | Pop. | ±% |
|---|---|---|
| 1801 | 6,404 | — |
| 1811 | 7,502 | +17.1% |
| 1821 | 9,578 | +27.7% |
| 1831 | 11,343 | +18.4% |
| 1841 | 12,436 | +9.6% |
| 1851 | 13,232 | +6.4% |
| 1861 | 22,675 | +71.4% |
| 1871 | 32,119 | +41.6% |
| 1881 | 41,563 | +29.4% |
| 1891 | 58,432 | +40.6% |
| 1901 | 84,784 | +45.1% |
| 1911 | 123,023 | +45.1% |
| 1921 | 169,204 | +37.5% |
| 1931 | 232,722 | +37.5% |
| 1941 | 272,356 | +17.0% |
| 1951 | 318,770 | +17.0% |
| 1961 | 311,951 | −2.1% |
| 1971 | 305,338 | −2.1% |
| 1981 | 290,204 | −5.0% |
| 1991 | 299,934 | +3.4% |
| 2001 | 314,561 | +4.9% |
| 2011 | 356,836 | +13.4% |
| 2021 | 389,300 | +9.1% |
| 2024 estimate | 405,050 | +4.0% |
Source: A Vision of Britain through time 2024 estimate

In 1801, the civil parishes that form the modern borough had a total population of 6,404; and the area was characterised by farming and woodland — with settlement principally around the Great North Road. By 1830, a new turnpike, the Finchley Road was constructed and horse-drawn omnibuses introduced. The population rose dramatically with the arrival of the trams and railways in the middle of 19th century, and new estates were built to house commuters. As industry relocated away from London during the 1960s, the population entered a decline, that has begun to reverse with new housing developments on brownfield sites.

According to the 2001 census the borough then had a population of 314,564 though the most recent ONS projection for 2008 is 331,500. 67% of householders are owner-occupiers. 47.3% of people described themselves as Christian, with the second largest group being Jewish at 14.8%, the highest percentage in any local government area in the United Kingdom. The third largest was people who said they had no religion at 12.8%. Just over a quarter of people belonged to non-white ethnic groups, up from 18% in the 1991 census. 12.3% were Asian and 6.0% black. Barnet had the largest Chinese population of any London borough in 2001, at 6,379.

As of 2011, 13.3% of the borough's population is over 65 - the sixth-highest of London's boroughs. The 65+ population is 47,400, the second-highest after Bromley. The Jewish population is 54,084 and represents 15.5% of the population - the highest in the United Kingdom. 41.2% identify themselves as Christians, and 16.1% with no religion.

The following table shows the ethnic group of respondents in the 2001 and 2011 census in Barnet.

=== Ethnicity ===
Ethnic makeup of Barnet by single year ages in 2021

| Ethnic Group | Year | | | | | | | | | | | | | |
| Ethnic Group | 1966 estimations | | 1971 estimations | | 1981 estimations | | 1991 census | | 2001 census | | 2011 census | | 2021 census | |
| Ethnic Group | Number | % | Number | % | Number | % | Number | % | Number | % | Number | % | Number | % |
| White: Total | | 97.5% | – | 94.4% | 247,854 | 87.2% | 239,549 | 81.6% | 232,868 | 74.03% | 228,553 | 64.13% | 224,762 | 57.8% |
|---|---|---|---|---|---|---|---|---|---|---|---|---|---|---|
| White: British | – | – | – | – | – | – | – | – | 188,301 | 59.86% | 162,117 | 45.49% | 140,777 | 36.2% |
| White: Irish | – | 3.3% | – | – | – | – | – | – | 10,545 | 3.35% | 8,685 | 2.44% | 7,644 | 2.0% |
| White: Gypsy or Irish Traveller | – | – | – | – | – | – | – | – | – | – | 151 | 0.04% | 179 | 0.0% |
| White: Roma | – | – | – | – | – | – | – | – | – | – | – | – | 1,554 | 0.4% |
| White: Other | – | – | – | – | – | – | – | – | 34,022 | 10.82% | 57,600 | 16.16% | 74,608 | 19.2% |
| Asian or Asian British: Total | – | 1.5% | – | – | – | – | 37,553 | 12.8% | 45,174 | 14.36% | 65,918 | 18.50% | 74,972 | 19.2% |
| Asian or Asian British: Indian | – | – | – | – | – | – | 21,572 | | 27,130 | 8.62% | 27,920 | 7.83% | 30,389 | 7.8% |
| Asian or Asian British: Pakistani | – | – | – | – | – | – | 2,297 | | 3,965 | 1.26% | 5,344 | 1.50% | 6,687 | 1.7% |
| Asian or Asian British: Bangladeshi | – | – | – | – | – | – | 1,180 | | 1,448 | 0.46% | 2,215 | 0.62% | 2,873 | 0.7% |
| Asian or Asian British: Chinese | – | – | – | – | – | – | 3,895 | | 6,379 | 2.03% | 8,259 | 2.32% | 9,434 | 2.4% |
| Asian or Asian British: Other Asian | – | – | – | – | – | – | 8,609 | | 6,252 | 1.99% | 22,180 | 6.22% | 25,589 | 6.6% |
| Black or Black British: Total | – | 1% | – | – | – | – | 10,472 | 3.5% | 18,859 | 6.00% | 27,431 | 7.70% | 30,651 | 7.9% |
| Black or Black British: African | – | 0.6% | – | – | – | – | 6,042 | | 13,651 | 4.34% | 19,392 | 5.44% | 22,670 | 5.8% |
| Black or Black British: Caribbean | – | 0.4% | – | – | – | – | 2,969 | | 4,113 | 1.31% | 4,468 | 1.25% | 4,951 | 1.3% |
| Black or Black British: Other Black | – | – | – | – | – | – | 1,461 | | 1,095 | 0.35% | 3,571 | 1.00% | 3,030 | 0.8% |
| Mixed or British Mixed: Total | – | – | – | – | – | – | – | – | 9,508 | 3.02% | 17,169 | 4.82% | 20,889 | 5.4% |
| Mixed: White and Black Caribbean | – | – | – | – | – | – | – | – | 1,670 | 0.53% | 3,097 | 0.87% | 3,505 | 0.9% |
| Mixed: White and Black African | – | – | – | – | – | – | – | – | 1,590 | 0.51% | 3,112 | 0.87% | 3,747 | 1.0% |
| Mixed: White and Asian | – | – | – | – | – | – | – | – | 3,218 | 1.02% | 5,882 | 1.65% | 6,032 | 1.5% |
| Mixed: Other Mixed | – | – | – | – | – | – | – | – | 3,030 | 0.96% | 5,078 | 1.42% | 7,605 | 2.0% |
| Other: Total | – | – | – | – | – | – | 5,990 | 2% | 8,155 | 2.59% | 17,315 | 4.86% | 38,070 | 9.8% |
| Other: Arab | | | – | – | – | – | – | – | – | – | 5,210 | 1.46% | 7,383 | 1.9% |
| Other: Any other ethnic group | | | – | – | – | – | 5,990 | 2% | 8,155 | 2.59% | 12,105 | 3.40% | 30,687 | 7.9% |
| Ethnic minority: Total | – | 2.5% | – | 5.6% | 36,465 | 12.8% | 54,015 | 18.4% | 81,696 | 25.97% | 127,833 | 35.87% | 164,582 | 42.2% |
| Total | – | 100% | – | 100% | 284,319 | 100% | 293,564 | 100% | 314,564 | 100.00% | 356,386 | 100.00% | 389,344 | 100% |

Faith in Barnet (2021)
1. Christian (36.6%)
2. No Religion (20.2%)
3. Jewish (14.5%)
4. Muslim (12.2%)
5. Hindu (5.70%)
6. Buddhist (1.10%)
7. Sikh (0.40%)
8. Other Religions (1.30%)
9. Religion not Stated (8.00%)

=== Religion ===
| Religion | 1995 estimates | | 2001 census | | 2021 census | |
| Religion | Number | % | Number | % | Number | % |
|---|---|---|---|---|---|---|
| Christian | – | – | 148,844 | 47.3 | 142,321 | 36.6 |
| No religion | – | – | 40,320 | 12.8 | 78,684 | 20.2 |
| Muslim | – | – | 19,373 | 6.2 | 47,688 | 12.2 |
| Hindu | – | – | 21,011 | 6.7 | 22,105 | 5.7 |
| Jewish | 50,000 | 17% | 46,686 | 14.8 | 56,616 | 14.5 |
| Sikh | – | – | 1,113 | 0.4 | 1,524 | 0.4 |
| Buddhist | – | – | 3,422 | 1.1 | 4,158 | 1.1 |
| Other religion | – | – | 3,215 | 1.0 | 5,192 | 1.3 |
| Religion not stated | – | – | 30,580 | 9.7 | 31,056 | 8.0 |
| Total | – | 100% | 314,564 | 100 | 389,344 | 100 |

=== Immigration ===
This list includes top-15 sources of immigration to Borough of Barnet for 2021 census:

| # | Country | Number |
|---|---|---|
| 1 | Romania | 13,430 |
| 2 | India | 11,335 |
| 3 | Iran | 11,227 |
| 4 | Poland | 7,551 |
| 5 | Israel | 4,720 |
| 6 | Ireland | 4,681 |
| 7 | Italy | 4,533 |
| 8 | Kenya | 4,384 |
| 9 | Philippines | 3,902 |
| 10 | Nigeria | 3,846 |
| 11 | Afghanistan | 3,729 |
| 12 | Albania | 3,680 |
| 13 | South Africa | 3,232 |
| 14 | China | 3,074 |
| 15 | Pakistan | 3,042 |

== Economy ==
Chipping Barnet has been a market town since the thirteenth century, the rest of the area was agricultural. In 1588 Queen Elizabeth I granted a charter to the Lord of the Manor of Barnet to hold a twice yearly horse fair. The first example of an American style out-of-town shopping centre was built at Brent Cross in the 1970s. McDonald's has its UK headquarters at East Finchley. Argonaut Games once had its head office in Edgware.

== Transport ==
=== Transport policy ===
Former mayor of London Ken Livingstone said once said that Barnet's transport agenda is "recklessly anti-public transport, anti-pedestrian and anti-cycling" and that Barnet has become a "laboratory experiment for some very ill-thought out policies". In 2004 cycle lanes were removed and cycle training funding cut by the controversial pro-motorist councillor Brian Coleman.

=== Road ===
The A5 is a major road in that forms much of the borough's western border. It is also the first Roman built road in England. It later took the Anglo-Saxon name Watling Street. The Great North Road passes through the borough starting at East Finchley and crossing into Hertfordshire at Monken Hadley. It was a coaching route used by mail coaches between London, York and Edinburgh. The many inns on the road provided accommodation, stabling for the horses and replacement mounts. A section of the A1 road was built to bypass this route through Mill Hill, eventually joining the Great North Road at Hatfield.

The Finchley Road was built as a turnpike in the 1830s linking the West End to Finchley. The A41 splits off from the Finchley Road just before it crosses the borough boundary, briefly merges with the A1 through Mill Hill, leaving the borough at Edgware.

The North Circular Road (or A406) is part of a north orbital route for London; it crosses the borough east–west linking all the other major routes. Junctions one, two and four of the M1 motorway are in the borough. London Gateway services is at the site of the abandoned third junction. The bus routes in the borough are managed by Transport for London.

=== Rail ===
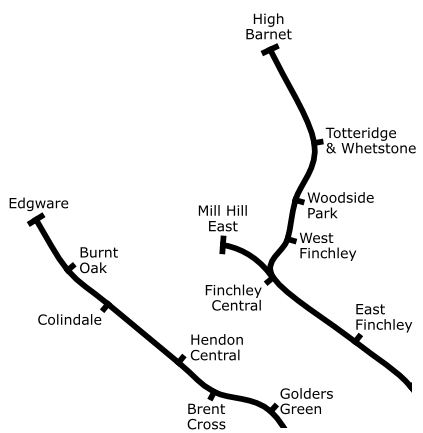
London Underground services in Barnet

The borough is served by the northernmost sections of the London Underground's Northern line, including all three of the line's northern termini (Edgware, High Barnet, and Mill Hill East). The surface sections of the High Barnet and Edgware branches are entirely in the borough. The High Barnet branch surfaces just before East Finchley station. At Finchley Central station there is a single-station spur to Mill Hill East station. The rest of the line continues north through West Finchley, Woodside Park and Totteridge and Whetstone stations to the terminus at High Barnet station.

The Edgware branch emerges at Golders Green station; the line continues on a series of viaducts through Brent Cross station to Hendon Central station. Here it goes through a tunnel before continuing above ground through Colindale and Burnt Oak stations to the terminus at Edgware station. The Piccadilly line, although in the Borough of Enfield, is very close to the border, with buses in Barnet connecting people to the stations.

There are two National Rail routes in Barnet. The Midland Main Line passes through the western edge of the borough, and is served by Thameslink at (from north to south): Mill Hill Broadway, Hendon, Brent Cross West and Cricklewood. The East Coast Main Line crosses the north-eastern corner of the borough, and is served by the Great Northern Route at New Barnet, Oakleigh Park and New Southgate (which straddles the border with the London Borough of Enfield).

There was a railway line joining the two sides of the borough, part of the Edgware, Highgate and London Railway which was going to be part of the Underground's Northern line "Northern Heights" expansion, but steam passenger services beyond Mill Hill East ended in 1939, and the completion of the electrification of this railway was eventually abandoned in the 1950s, primarily because the full extension would have breached the Town and Country Planning Act 1947 (10 & 11 Geo. 6. c. 51). What track was laid, was removed in the 1960s, with a small part of the trackbed used for the M1 motorway extension in the 1970s.

=== Travel to work ===
In March 2011, the main forms of transport that residents aged 16–74 used to travel to work were (expressed as percentages of all residents aged 16–74):

| Method of transport | Percentage |
|---|---|
| not in employment | 33.9% |
| driving a car or van | 24.1% |
| underground, metro, light rail, tram | 17.3% |
| bus, minibus or coach | 7.9% |
| work mainly at or from home | 4.9% |
| on foot | 4.1% |
| train | 3.9% |
| passenger in a car or van | 1.4% |
| bicycle | 0.9% |

== Public services ==
=== Health ===
Barnet Clinical Commissioning Group commissions NHS services for Barnet residents. Health care providers active within Barnet include the Royal Free London NHS Foundation Trust, which runs Barnet Hospital, Chase Farm Hospital and some clinics at Edgware Community Hospital, and Central London Community Healthcare NHS Trust, which runs Finchley Memorial Hospital and other services at Edgware Community Hospital.

=== Emergency services ===
The London Ambulance Service responds to medical emergencies in the area. Home Office policing in the borough is provided by the Metropolitan Police Service. There are two police stations in the borough at: Colindale and Barnet. Though only Colindale is open to the public. The Peel Centre at Hendon is the Metropolitan Police College.

Statutory emergency fire service is provided by the London Fire Brigade. There are four fire stations that operate in the Borough of Barnet. These are mobilised to protect around 330,000 people. The main risks identified in the borough include Brent Cross Shopping Centre, Coppetts Wood Hospital and Barnet Hospital. Between the four stations; six pumping appliances, One Operational Support Unit and a High Volume Pump are operated.

=== Education ===
The London Borough of Barnet has 86 primary schools, 22 secondary schools and four special schools. Woodhouse College is a single site state sixth form college in North Finchley. The main college in the borough is Barnet College, with five sites. Middlesex University has its main campus at Hendon. University College London has its teaching observatory at Mill Hill.

=== Libraries ===
There are 15 council-run libraries in the London Borough of Barnet, mobile library and home library services, and a local studies and archives library.

== Twin towns and sister cities ==
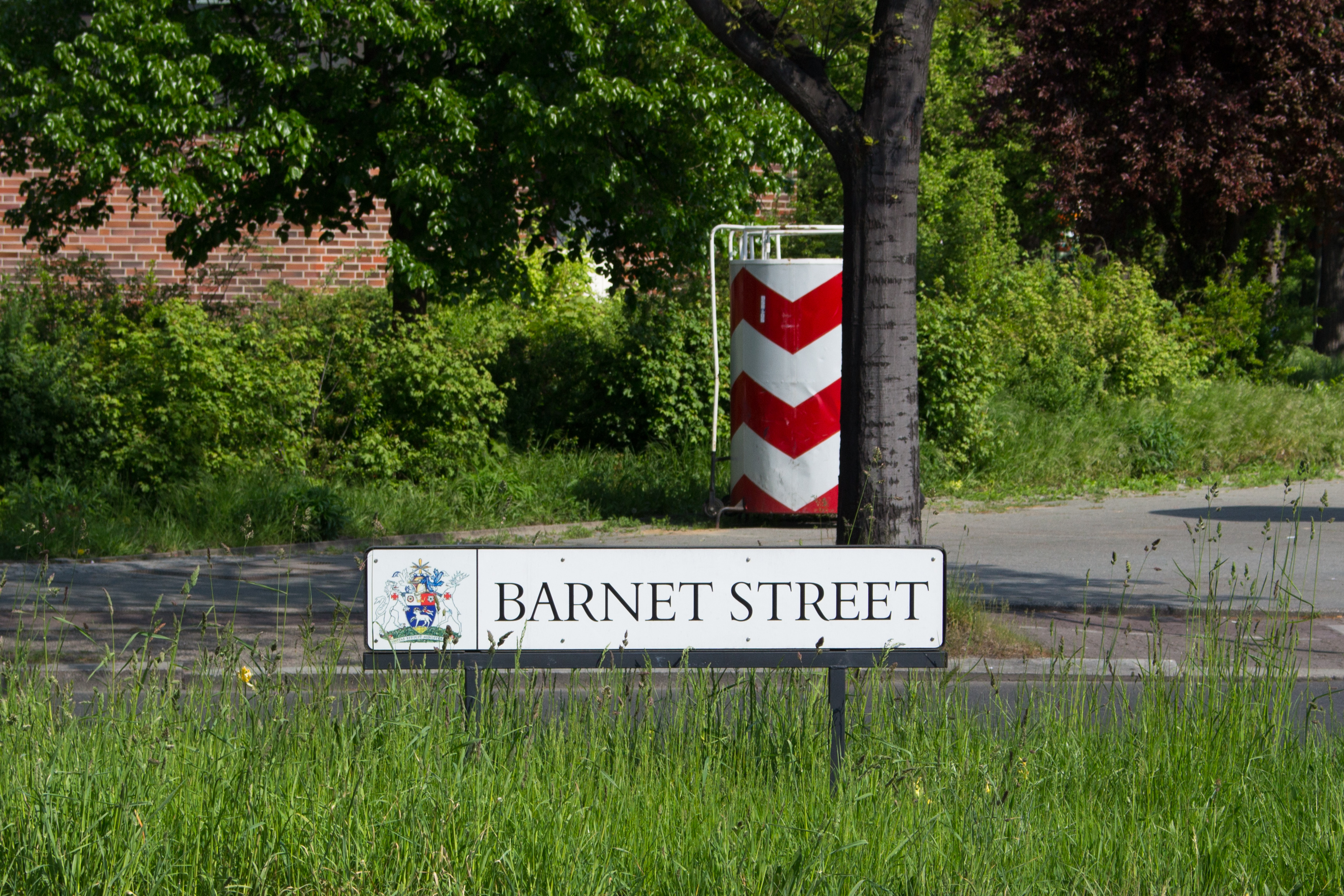
Street sign "Barnet Street" (Barnetstraße) in the Tempelhof-Schöneberg district of Berlin. The district also has streets called Hendonstraße and Finchleystraße

- Montclair Township, Essex County, New Jersey, United States
- Chaville, Hauts-de-Seine, Île-de-France, France
- Le Raincy, Seine-Saint-Denis, Île-de-France, France
- Morphou, Cyprus
- Pokhara, Nepal
- Ramat Gan, Israel
- Siegen-Wittgenstein, North Rhine-Westphalia, Germany
- Tempelhof-Schöneberg, Berlin, Germany

== Freedom of the Borough ==
The following people and military units have received the Freedom of the Borough of Barnet.

=== Individuals ===
- Margaret Thatcher: 6 February 1980.

=== Military units ===
- HMS Musketeer, RN: 20 December 1941. (Awarded by the East Barnet Urban District Council)
- HMS Cromer, RN: 14 March 1942. (Awarded by the East Barnet Urban District Council)
- HMS Fantome, RN: 28 March 1942. (Awarded by the Friern Barnet Urban District Council)
- The Queen's Regiment: 16 April 1970.
- 240 (Hertfordshire) Squadron Royal Corps of Transport (Volunteers): 21 October 1979.
- B Company 6/7 (Volunteer) Battalion Queen's Regiment: 1979.
- 3 Company 10th (Volunteer) Battalion Parachute Regiment: 1979.
- The Corps of Royal Engineers: 24 July 1982.
- RAF Hendon: 29 July 1986.
- Royal Logistic Corps, Postal and Courier Services: 19 April 1994.
- The Princess of Wales's Royal Regiment: 23 February 1998.

- The Royal Air Force Museum: 26 October 2018.

=== Sports teams ===
- Saracens Rugby Club: 20 February 2018.

== See also ==
- List of churches in the London Borough of Barnet
- List of people from Barnet
- Nature reserves in Barnet
- Parks and open spaces in Barnet
- Barnet London Borough Council elections
