= Hornchurch (electoral division) =

Electoral division in Greater London, 1973–1986

- Former electoral division for the Greater London Council
- Hornchurch electoral division boundaries
- District: Havering
- Electorate: 60,175 (1973); 60,323 (1977); 61,457 (1981)
- Major settlements: Hornchurch
- Area: 3,531 hectares (35.31 km^{2})

Former electoral division
- Created: 1973
- Abolished: 1986
- Member: 1
- Created from: Havering

Hornchurch was an electoral division for the purposes of elections to the Greater London Council. The constituency elected one councillor for a four-year term in 1973, 1977 and 1981, with the final term extended for an extra year ahead of the abolition of the Greater London Council.

== History ==
It was planned to use the same boundaries as the Westminster Parliament constituencies for election of councillors to the Greater London Council (GLC), as had been the practice for elections to the predecessor London County Council, but those that existed in 1965 crossed the Greater London boundary. Until new constituencies could be settled, the 32 London boroughs were used as electoral areas. The London Borough of Havering formed the Havering electoral division. This was used for the Greater London Council elections in 1964, 1967 and 1970.

The new constituencies were settled following the Second Periodic Review of Westminster constituencies and the new electoral division matched the boundaries of the Hornchurch parliamentary constituency.

It covered an area of 3,531 hectares (35.31 km^{2}).

== Elections ==
The Hornchurch constituency was used for the Greater London Council elections in 1973, 1977 and 1981. One councillor was elected at each election using first-past-the-post voting.

=== 1973 election ===
The fourth election to the GLC (and first using revised boundaries) was held on 12 April 1973. The electorate was 60,175 and one Labour Party councillor was elected. The turnout was 38.9%. The councillor was elected for a three-year term. This was extended for an extra year in 1976 when the electoral cycle was switched to four-yearly.

1973 Greater London Council election: Hornchurch
Party	Candidate	Votes	%	±%
Labour	Serge Lourie	10,714	45.77	
Conservative	R. D. Mitchell	7,114	30.40	
Liberal	B. G. McCarthy	3,666	15.66	
Non-Party Conservationist	B. Percy-Davis	1,908	8.16	
Turnout				
Labour win (new seat)				

=== 1977 election ===
The fifth election to the GLC (and second using revised boundaries) was held on 5 May 1977. The electorate was 60,323 and one Conservative Party councillor was elected. The turnout was 47.0%. The councillor was elected for a four-year term.

1977 Greater London Council election: Hornchurch
Party	Candidate	Votes	%	±%
Conservative	John Reveley Major	13,739	48.56	
Labour	Serge Lourie	9,777	34.54	
Liberal	M. L. C. Long	1,944	6.87	
National Front	A. F. Harris	1,577	5.57	
People and Agrarian Party	B. Percy-Davis	1,269	4.48	
Turnout				
Conservative gain from Labour		Swing		

John Reveley Major stood and won the Chipping Barnet seat at the 1981 election.

=== 1981 election ===
The sixth and final election to the GLC (and third using revised boundaries) was held on 7 May 1981. The electorate was 61,457 and one Labour Party councillor was elected. The turnout was 46.9%. The councillor was elected for a four-year term, extended by an extra year by the Local Government (Interim Provisions) Act 1984, ahead of the abolition of the council.

1981 Greater London Council election: Hornchurch
Party	Candidate	Votes	%	±%
Labour	Alan Ronald Williams	13,734	47.69	
Conservative	Robert James MacGillivray Neill	10,845	37.65	
Liberal	Adrienne L. McCarthy	4,226	14.67	
Turnout				
Labour gain from Conservative		Swing		

Robert James MacGillivray Neill was later elected at the 1985 Romford by-election.
