= Hendon South (electoral division) =

Electoral division in Greater London, 1973–1986

- Former electoral division for the Greater London Council
- District: Barnet
- Electorate: 52,699 (1973); 54,274 (1977); 52,968 (1981)
- Area: 1,659 hectares (16.59 km^{2})

Former electoral division
- Created: 1973
- Abolished: 1986
- Member: 1
- Created from: Barnet

Hendon South was an electoral division for the purposes of elections to the Greater London Council. The constituency elected one councillor for a four-year term in 1973, 1977 and 1981, with the final term extended for an extra year ahead of the abolition of the Greater London Council.

== History ==
It was planned to use the same boundaries as the Westminster Parliament constituencies for election of councillors to the Greater London Council (GLC), as had been the practice for elections to the predecessor London County Council, but those that existed in 1965 crossed the Greater London boundary. Until new constituencies could be settled, the 32 London boroughs were used as electoral areas. The London Borough of Barnet formed the Barnet electoral division. This was used for the Greater London Council elections in 1964, 1967 and 1970.

The new constituencies were settled following the Second Periodic Review of Westminster constituencies and the new electoral division matched the boundaries of the Hendon South parliamentary constituency.

It covered an area of 1,659 hectares (16.59 km^{2}).

== Elections ==
The Hendon South constituency was used for the Greater London Council elections in 1973, 1977 and 1981. One councillor was elected at each election using first-past-the-post voting.

=== 1973 election ===
The fourth election to the GLC (and first using revised boundaries) was held on 12 April 1973. The electorate was 52,699 and one Conservative Party councillor was elected. The turnout was 38.1%. The councillor was elected for a three-year term. This was extended for an extra year in 1976 when the electoral cycle was switched to four-yearly.

1973 Greater London Council election: Hendon South
Party	Candidate	Votes	%	±%
Conservative	Peter Blair Black	8,229	40.95	
Labour	Mildred Gordon	6,874	34.22	
Liberal	Percy Walter Meyer	4,992	24.83	
Turnout				
Conservative win (new seat)				

=== 1977 election ===
The fifth election to the GLC (and second using revised boundaries) was held on 5 May 1977. The electorate was 54,274 and one Conservative Party councillor was elected. The turnout was 46.1%. The councillor was elected for a four-year term.

1977 Greater London Council election: Hendon South
Party	Candidate	Votes	%	±%
Conservative	Peter Blair Black	15,402	61.61	
Labour	P. Benson	5,980	23.92	
Liberal	Brian E. J. Ellis	2,906	11.62	
National Front	Susan E. Warner	598	2.39	
Independent	G. L. Moon	113	0.45	
Turnout				
Conservative hold		Swing		

=== 1981 election ===
The sixth and final election to the GLC (and third using revised boundaries) was held on 7 May 1981. The electorate was 52,968 and one Conservative Party councillor was elected. The turnout was 38.4%. The councillor was elected for a four-year term, extended by an extra year by the Local Government (Interim Provisions) Act 1984, ahead of the abolition of the council.

1981 Greater London Council election: Hendon South
Party	Candidate	Votes	%	±%
Conservative	Peter Blair Black	9,796	48.18	
Labour	Montague Miller	6,599	32.47	
Liberal	Andrew J. Bridgwater	3,933	19.35	
Turnout				
Conservative hold		Swing		
