= Odeon Cinema, Barnet =

Cinema in Barnet, London, England

Coordinates: 51.6464°N 0.1878°W

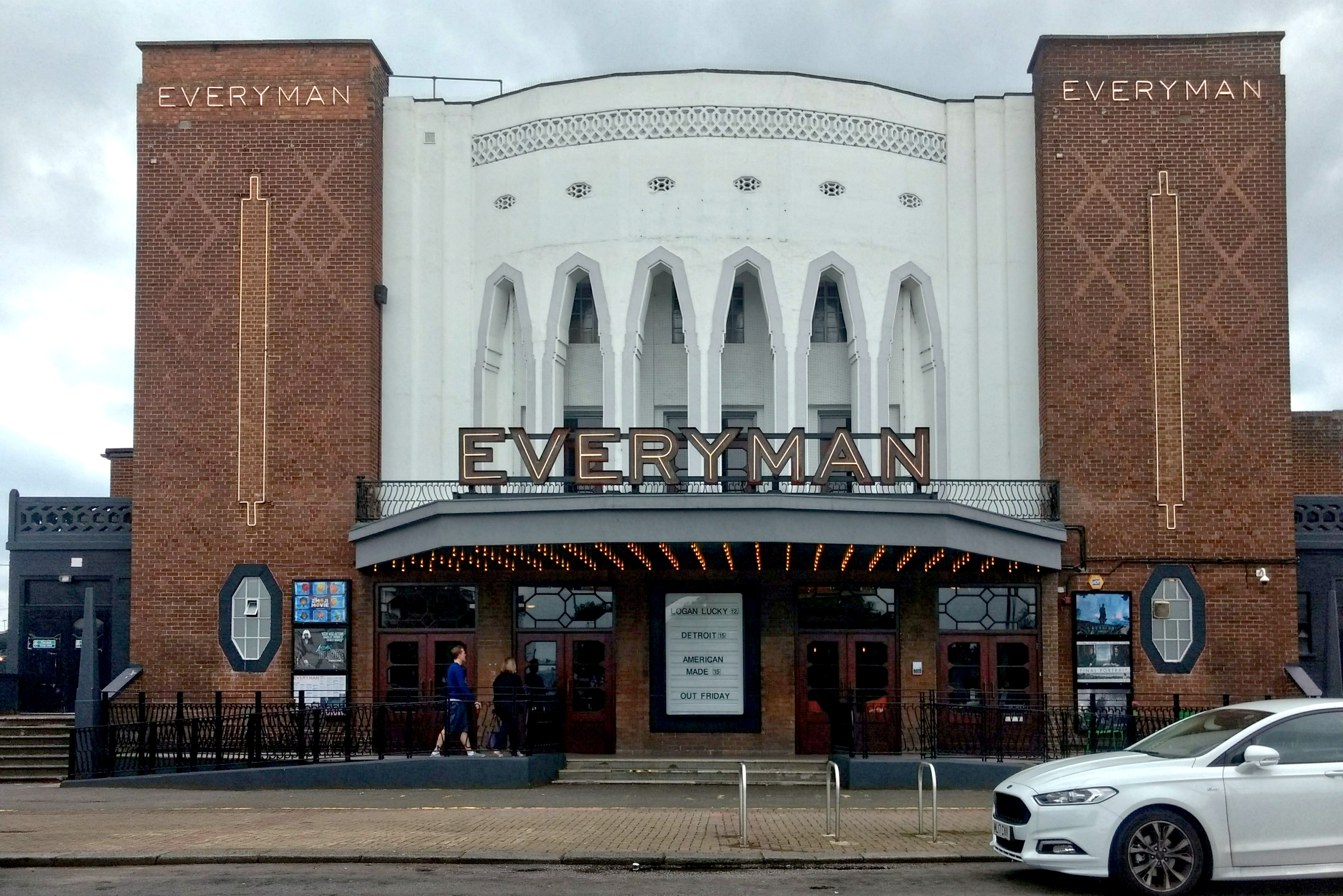
The cinema in Everyman branding.

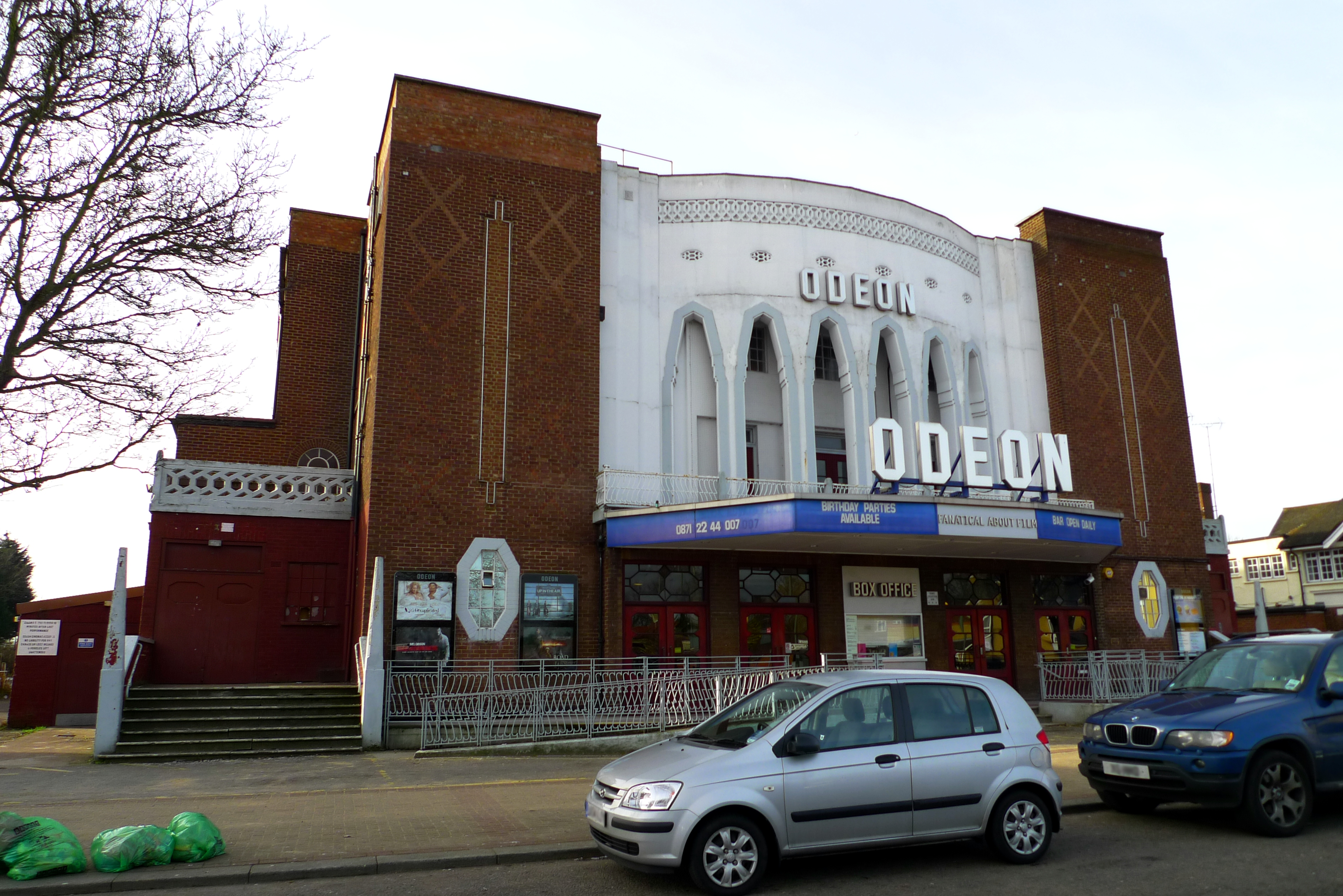
When it was an Odeon.

Originally The Odeon Cinema, Great North Road, in the London Borough of Barnet a grade II listed building. In 2015, the cinema was one of four purchased from Odeon by Everyman Cinemas.

The cinema opened in 1935 and closed on 12 July 2015. It reopened as an Everyman Cinema later in 2015. There is a bus stop named after it (Barnet Everyman, previously Barnet Odeon) served by London Bus Routes 34, 107, 184, 234, 263, 307, 326, 383, 384, 389, and N20
