= Homes before Roads =

Anti-road building protest group in the United Kingdom

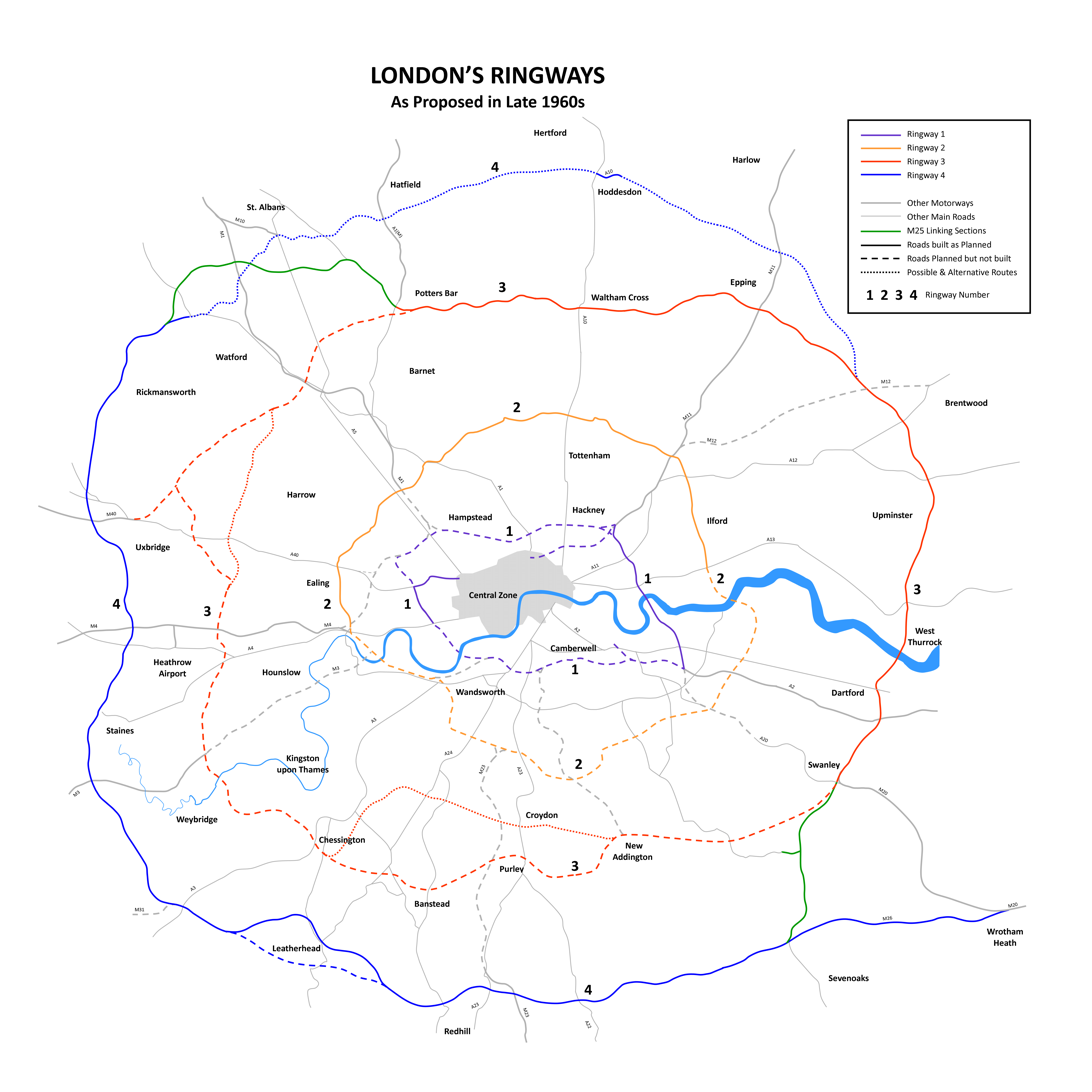
The London Ringways scheme planned in the late 1960s

Homes before Roads was a 1970s political movement and campaign in the United Kingdom initially formed in London in 1970 to oppose plans to construct a system of four interlinked concentric motorways through and around London, known as Ringways. The name was subsequently used by other anti-motorway campaigns elsewhere in the country.

== In London ==
Homes before Roads were active in campaigning against the Draft Greater London Development Plan containing the motorway proposals and in fighting it in the associated public inquiry. The movement put up candidates in 80 of the 100 seats in the 1970 elections to the Greater London Council. Although Homes Before Roads only received 2 per cent of the vote, the Labour Party in London, which had originally commissioned the motorway plans and supported them along with the Conservatives during the 1970 elections, subsequently adopted a policy opposing the scheme. As a result, the plans were cancelled after Labour gained control of the Council in the 1973 GLC elections, adopting policies in favour of public transport and traffic management instead, although by then several sections had already been built.

== Elsewhere ==
Many of the movement's supporters went on to fight motorway proposals elsewhere in the country under the Homes before Roads banner, which received widespread public recognition due to the national debate that ensued during the high-profile campaign in London. A core of around 150 people provided speakers, expert witnesses and organised media coverage.

== See also ==
- London Ringways
- Road protest in the United Kingdom

== Bibliography ==
- Asher, Wayne. 2018. Rings Around London – Orbital Motorways and The Battle For Homes Before Roads. ISBN 978-1-85414-421-8
