= Oliver Stutchbury =

British politician

Oliver Piers Stutchbury (January 1927 – February 2011) was a British politician.

Born in Sussex, Stutchbury was educated at Radley College. During World War II, he served with the Grenadier Guards, becoming a lieutenant, then he attended King's College, Cambridge. He became a solicitor's clerk, and joined the Conservative Party. He stood in Rhondda East at the 1951 United Kingdom general election, taking second place but only 10.3% of the vote.

Later in the 1950s, Stutchbury became concerned about nuclear proliferation. He left the Conservatives and joined the Campaign for Nuclear Disarmament; by the 1960s, he had also joined the Labour Party. He worked at the Save and Prosper unit trust fund, the largest in the City of London, became its chief executive, and wrote The Management of Unit Trusts, an influential textbook. However, he resigned from his job in 1966 to work as a volunteer fundraising adviser to the Labour Party, also completing a PhD at King's College. This was soon published as Use of Principle, in which he argued that all lies were unethical.

In 1970, Stutchbury resigned from his fundraising role, complaining that his ideas were not being taken up, and instead sought a winnable Parliamentary seat. He failed to be selected, and although he was shortlisted for the post of General Secretary of the Labour Party in 1972, he also failed to be selected for that post. Instead, in 1973, he stood in the 1973 Greater London Council election, in Ealing. Although narrowly defeated, he was appointed as an alderman. However, he decided that the council was ineffective, resigned and published Too Much Government? A Political Aeneid. He launched the GLC Abolitionist Campaign, which attracted defectors from parties as diverse as the Communist Party of Great Britain and the National Front. It stood 31 candidates in the 1977 Greater London Council election, but attracted few votes.

Stutchbury moved to Devon, where he ran a business. In 1980, he was linked to the formation of the Association of Democratic Groups, led by Colin Phipps. This achieved little, and the Abolitionist Campaign was revived as "Abolish the GLC" with 7 candidates standing in the 1981 Greater London Council election.
