= Second periodic review of Westminster constituencies =

1960s review of UK electoral boundaries

The second periodic review of Westminster constituencies was undertaken between 1965 and 1969 by the four boundary commissions for England, Scotland, Wales and Northern Ireland for the United Kingdom Parliament as provided by the House of Commons (Redistribution of Seats) Act 1949 and amended by House of Commons (Redistribution of Seats) Act 1958. The changes to the constituencies were approved in 1970 and took effect at the February 1974 United Kingdom general election.

== Review and approval process ==
Under the House of Commons (Redistribution of Seats) Act 1958, the four boundary commissions were required to review the boundaries of parliamentary constituencies in their respective countries every 10 to 15 years. The commissions commenced their reports in 1965 and completed them in 1969. Although the final recommendations were laid before Parliament (1968-69 Cmnd. 4084-4087), the Labour Government did not put them forward for approval before calling an election which was held in June 1970. Following the election, the new Conservative Government put the proposals forward and they were approved by Parliament on 11 November 1970 through the following Statutory Instruments:

- 1970 No. 1674 - Parliamentary Constituencies (England) Order 1970
- 1970 No. 1675 - Parliamentary Constituencies (Wales) Order 1970
- 1970 No. 1678 - Parliamentary Constituencies (Northern Ireland) Order 1970
- 1970 No. 1680 - Parliamentary Constituencies (Scotland) Order 1970

The new boundaries were first applied for the February 1974 general election. Accordingly, there was a gap of nine years between the beginning of the process and their first application, by which time the local authority boundaries used in the review had been superseded by the major reorganisation of local authorities brought in by the Local Government Act 1972 which came into effect on 1 April 1974. The boundaries and constituencies introduced by the Second Review were also used for the general elections of October 1974 and 1979. They were superseded by the boundaries introduced by the Third Review which came into effect for the 1983 general election.

== Summary of changes ==
As a result of the considerable delay between the first and second periodic reviews, there were a large number of significant changes, with the total number of seats increasing from 630 to 635. There were 108 new constituencies created and 103 abolished, excluding 13 constituencies with very minor or no changes which were renamed. The resulting net increase of 5 constituencies were all in England (511 to 516), with the number of constituencies in Wales (36), Scotland (71) and Northern Ireland (12) remaining the same. There were changes to a further 311 constituencies, of which 105 were of a very minor nature, mainly bringing constituency boundaries in line with local authority boundaries which had been altered. This left 216 constituencies which were unchanged.

The Review took into account the creation of Greater London with effect from 1 April 1965, as provided by the London Government Act 1963. There was a net decrease of 11 seats within Greater London and this was offset by increases in seats in the surrounding counties of Essex, Hertfordshire, Buckinghamshire, Berkshire, Surrey and Kent. The constituencies in Greater London were used as the basis for electoral divisions for the Greater London Council.

There had also been significant reorganisations of local authorities in the Black Country and Teesside resulting in major changes to boundaries in these areas. Outside the large cities, the bulk the constituencies in Lancashire and the West Riding of Yorkshire were unchanged.

The commissions had carried out interim reviews in 1956, 1960 and 1964 under the provisions of the House of Commons (Redistribution of Seats) Act 1949 to bring boundaries into line with those of local authorities. This resulted in the passing of 31 Statutory Instruments, affecting 79 constituencies.

== List of constituencies created, abolished or altered ==
Primary source: Craig, F. W. S. (1972). Boundaries of Parliamentary Constituencies 1885-1972. Chichester: Political Reference Publications. ISBN 0-900178-09-4. Pages 119 to 158.

Also referred to Boundary Maps on the Vision of Britain Through Time website.

BC denotes a Borough Constituency; CC denotes a County Constituency.

=== England ===
County	Seats 1955-74	Created	Abolished	Altered	No change (or very minor change)	Seats 1974-83
Bedfordshire	4	Luton East BC Luton West BC	Luton BC	Mid Bedfordshire CC South Bedfordshire CC	Bedford CC	5
Berkshire	5	Reading North BC Reading South CC	Reading BC	Newbury CC Wokingham CC	Abingdon CC Windsor and Maidenhead CC (formerly Windsor CC)	6
Buckinghamshire	5	Beaconsfield CC Chesham and Amersham CC	South Buckinghamshire CC	Aylesbury CC Buckingham CC Wycombe CC	Eton and Slough BC	6
Cambridgeshire and Isle of Ely	3			Isle of Ely CC	Cambridgeshire CC Cambridge BC	3
Cheshire	16	Bebington and Ellesmere Port BC Hazel Grove BC	Bebington BC	Knutsford CC Macclesfield CC Wirral CC Birkenhead BC Cheadle BC	City of Chester CC Crewe CC Nantwich CC Northwich CC Runcorn CC Stalybridge and Hyde CC Altrincham and Sale BC Stockport North BC Stockport South BC Wallasey BC	17
Cornwall	5			Bodmin CC North Cornwall CC Truro CC	Falmouth and Camborne CC St Ives CC	5
Cumberland	4				Penrith and the Border CC Whitehaven CC Workington CC Carlisle BC	4
Derbyshire	10			Belper CC North East Derbyshire CC South East Derbyshire CC Derby North BC Derby South BC	Bolsover CC High Peak CC Ilkeston CC West Derbyshire CC Chesterfield BC	10
Devon	10	West Devon CC Plymouth, Drake BC	Tavistock CC Torrington CC	Honiton CC North Devon CC Tiverton CC Exeter BC Plymouth, Devonport BC Plymouth, Sutton BC	Totnes CC Torbay BC (formerly Torquay BC)	10
Dorset	4				North Dorset CC South Dorset CC West Dorset CC Poole BC	4
Durham	17		Sedgefield CC	Bishop Auckland CC Durham CC Easington CC Houghton-le-Spring CC North West Durham CC Blaydon CC Sunderland North BC Sunderland South BC	Chester-le-Street CC Consett CC Darlington BC Gateshead East BC Gateshead West BC Jarrow BC South Shields BC Hartlepool BC (formerly The Hartlepools BC)	16
Essex	12	Braintree CC Brentwood and Ongar CC Epping Forest CC Harlow CC Basildon BC	Billericay CC Chigwell CC Epping CC	Chelmsford CC Maldon CC Saffron Walden CC South East Essex CC	Colchester CC Harwich CC Southend East BC Southend West BC Thurrock BC	14
Gloucestershire	12	Kingswood CC	Bristol Central BC	South Gloucestershire CC West Gloucestershire CC Bristol North East BC Bristol South East BC Bristol West BC Gloucester BC	Cirencester and Tewksbury CC Stroud CC Bristol North West BC Bristol South BC Cheltenham BC	12
Greater London	103	Bethnal Green and Bow BC Bexleyheath BC Brent East BC Brent North BC Brent South BC Brentford and Isleworth BC Chingford BC Chipping Barnet BC Croydon South BC Enfield North BC Feltham and Heston BC Hackney South and Shoreditch BC Islington Central BC Islington South and Finsbury BC Kensington BC Lambeth Central BC Lewisham East BC Mitcham and Morden BC Newham North East BC Newham South BC Paddington BC Ravensbourne BC Sidcup BC Stepney and Poplar BC Tooting BC Upminster BC Walthamstow BC	Barnet CC East Surrey CC Barons Court BC Bethnal Green BC Bexley BC Brentford and Chiswick BC Brixton BC Bromley BC Clapham BC Ealing South BC East Ham North BC East Ham South BC Enfield East BC Enfield West BC Feltham BC Heston and Isleworth BC Islington East BC Islington South West BC Kensington North BC Kensington South BC Lewisham North BC Lewisham South BC Merton and Morden BC Mitcham BC Paddington North BC Paddington South BC Poplar BC Shoreditch and Finsbury BC Southwark BC Stepney BC Wandsworth Central BC Wembley North BC Wembley South BC Walthamstow East BC Walthamstow West BC Willesden East BC Willesden West BC West Ham South BC	Battersea North BC Battersea South BC Beckenham BC Bermondsey BC Carshalton BC Chelsea BC Chislehurst BC Ealing, Acton BC Ealing North BC Ealing, Southall BC Enfield, Southgate BC Finchley BC Fulham BC Hackney Central BC Hackney North and Stoke Newington BC (formerly Stoke Newington and Hackney North BC) Hammersmith North BC Hayes and Harlington BC Hendon North BC Hendon South BC Hornchurch BC Ilford North BC Islington North BC Lewisham, Deptford BC Lewisham West BC Peckham BC Putney BC Romford BC Streatham BC Uxbridge BC Vauxhall BC Wanstead and Woodford BC Wimbledon BC	Barking BC City of London and Westminster South BC (formerly Cities of London and Westminster BC) Croydon Central BC (formerly Croydon South BC) Croydon North East BC Croydon North West BC Dagenham BC Dulwich BC Edmonton BC Erith and Crayford BC Greenwich BC Hampstead BC Harrow Central BC Harrow East BC Harrow West BC Holborn and St Pancras South BC Hornsey BC Ilford South BC Kingston-upon-Thames BC Leyton BC Newham North West BC (formerly West Ham North BC) Norwood BC Orpington BC Richmond BC (formerly Richmond (Surrey) BC) St Marylebone BC St Pancras North BC Surbiton BC Sutton and Cheam BC Ruislip-Northwood BC Tottenham BC Twickenham BC Wood Green BC Woolwich East BC Woolwich West BC	92
Hampshire	14	Bournemouth East BC Christchurch and Lymington BC Fareham BC Gosport BC Havant and Waterloo BC Portsmouth North BC	Bournemouth East and Christchurch BC Gosport and Fareham BC Portsmouth, Langstone BC Portsmouth West BC	Aldershot CC Basingstoke CC Eastleigh CC New Forest CC Winchester CC Bournemouth West BC Portsmouth South BC	Petersfield CC Southampton, Itchen BC Southampton, Test BC	16
Herefordshire	2				Hereford CC Leominster CC	2
Hertfordshire	7	Hertford and Stevenage CC South Hertfordshire CC Welwyn and Hatfield CC	Hertford CC	East Hertfordshire CC Hemel Hempstead CC Hitchin CC St Albans CC South West Hertfordshire CC	Watford BC	9
Huntingdonshire and Peterborough	2			Huntingdonshire CC Peterborough BC (previously included with Northamptonshire)		2
Isle of Wight	1				Isle of Wight CC	1
Kent	13	Royal Tunbridge Wells CC Tonbridge and Malling CC Thanet East BC Thanet West BC	Isle of Thanet CC Tonbridge CC	Ashford CC Dartford CC Sevenoaks CC	Canterbury CC Dover and Deal CC (formerly Dover CC) Faversham CC Folkestone and Hythe CC Gravesend CC Maidstone CC Gillingham BC Rochester and Chatham BC	15
Lancashire	62	Liverpool, Scotland Exchange BC Manchester Central BC	Liverpool, Exchange BC Liverpool, Scotland BC Manchester, Cheetham BC Manchester, Exchange BC	Huyton CC Ormskirk CC Bootle BC Crosby BC Liverpool, Edge Hill BC Liverpool, Kirkdale BC Liverpool, Toxteth BC Manchester, Ardwick BC Manchester, Moss Side BC Manchester, Withington BC Manchester, Wythenshawe BC	Chorley CC Clitheroe CC Darwen CC Heywood and Royton CC Lancaster CC Morecambe and Lonsdale CC Newton CC North Fylde CC South Fylde CC Westhoughton CC Widnes CC Accrington BC Ashton-under-Lyne BC Barrow-in-Furness BC Blackburn BC Blackpool North BC Blackpool South BC Bolton East BC Bolton West BC Burnley BC Bury and Radcliffe BC Eccles BC Farnworth BC Ince BC Leigh BC Liverpool, Garston BC Liverpool, Walton BC Liverpool, Wavertree BC Liverpool, West Derby BC Manchester, Blackley BC Manchester, Gorton BC Manchester, Openshaw BC Middleton and Prestwich BC Nelson and Colne BC Oldham East BC Oldham West BC Preston North BC Preston South BC Rochdale BC Rossendale BC St Helens BC Salford East BC Salford West BC Southport BC Stretford BC Warrington BC Wigan BC	60
Leicestershire	8	Blaby CC Leicester East BC Leicester South BC Leicester West BC	Leicester North East BC Leicester North West BC Leicester South East BC Leicester South West BC	Harborough CC Loughborough CC Melton CC	Bosworth CC	8
Lincolnshire (Parts of Holland)	1				Holland with Boston CC	1
Lincolnshire (Parts of Kesteven) and Rutlandshire	2				Grantham CC Rutland and Stamford CC	2
Lincolnshire (Parts of Lindsey)	6				Brigg CC Gainsborough CC Horncastle CC Louth CC Grimsby BC Lincoln BC	6
Norfolk	8	North West Norfolk CC	Central Norfolk CC King's Lynn CC	North Norfolk CC South Norfolk CC Yarmouth CC	South West Norfolk CC Norwich North BC Norwich South BC	7
Northamptonshire	4	Daventry CC Northampton North BC Northampton South BC	South Northamptonshire CC Northampton BC	Kettering CC Wellingborough CC		5
Northumberland	10				Berwick-upon-Tweed CC Hexham CC Morpeth CC Blyth CC Newcastle upon Tyne Central BC Newcastle upon Tyne East BC Newcastle upon Tyne North BC Newcastle upon Tyne West BC Tynemouth BC Wallsend BC	10
Nottinghamshire	10	Beeston CC Nottingham North BC	Nottingham Central BC Nottingham South BC	Ashfield CC Carlton CC Rushcliffe CC Nottingham North BC Nottingham West BC	Bassetlaw CC Mansfield CC Newark CC	10
Oxfordshire	3	Mid Oxon CC		Banbury CC Henley CC	Oxford BC	4
Shropshire	4			Ludlow CC The Wrekin CC	Oswestry CC Shrewsbury CC	4
Somerset	7				Bridgwater CC North Somerset CC Taunton CC Wells CC Weston-super-Mare CC Yeovil CC Bath BC	7
Staffordshire	19	South West Staffordshire CC Aldridge-Brownhills BC Dudley East BC Dudley West BC West Bromwich East BC West Bromwich West BC Wolverhampton South East BC	Brierley Hill CC Bilston BC Dudley BC Rowley Regis and Tipton BC Wednesbury BC West Bromwich BC	Cannock CC Leek CC Lichfield and Tamworth CC Stoke-on-Trent North BC Walsall North BC Walsall South BC Wolverhampton North East BC Wolverhampton South West BC	Burton CC Stafford and Stone CC Newcastle-under-Lyme BC Stoke-on-Trent Central BC Stoke-on-Trent South BC	20
Suffolk	5				Bury St Edmunds CC Eye CC Lowestoft CC Sudbury and Woodbridge CC Ipswich BC	5
Surrey	9	East Surrey CC North West Surrey CC Chertsey and Walton BC	Chertsey CC	Woking CC Esher BC Reigate BC	Dorking CC Farnham CC Guildford CC Epsom and Ewell BC (formerly Epsom CC) Spelthorne BC	11
Sussex (East)	8	Mid Sussex CC		Eastbourne CC East Grinstead CC Lewes CC	Rye CC Brighton, Kemptown BC Brighton, Pavilion BC Hastings BC Hove BC	9
Sussex (West)	4	Arundel CC Horsham and Crawley CC Shoreham CC	Arundel and Shoreham CC Horsham CC	Chichester CC	Worthing BC	5
Warwickshire	23	Birmingham, Erdington BC Coventry North East BC Coventry North West BC Coventry South East BC Coventry South West BC	Birmingham, All Saints BC Birmingham, Aston BC Coventry East BC Coventry North BC Coventry South BC	Meriden CC Stratford-on-Avon CC Warwick and Leamington CC Birmingham, Edgbaston BC Birmingham, Ladywood BC Birmingham, Northfield BC Birmingham, Selly Oak BC Birmingham, Small Heath BC Solihull BC Sutton Coldfield BC	Rugby CC Birmingham, Hall Green BC Birmingham, Handsworth BC Birmingham, Perry Barr BC Birmingham, Sparkbrook BC Birmingham, Stechford BC Birmingham, Yardley BC Nuneaton BC	23
Westmorland	1				Westmorland CC	1
Wiltshire	5				Chippenham CC Devizes CC Salisbury CC Westbury CC Swindon BC	5
Worcestershire	6	Halesowen and Stourbridge BC Warley East BC Warley West BC	Oldbury and Halesowen BC Smethwick BC	Kidderminster CC South Worcestershire CC	Bromsgrove and Redditch CC (formerly Bromsgrove CC) Worcester BC	7
Yorkshire (East Riding)	6	Kingston upon Hull Central BC	Kingston upon Hull North BC	Kingston upon Hull East BC	Bridlington CC Haltemprice CC Howden CC Kingston upon Hull West BC	6
Yorkshire (North Riding)	7	Cleveland and Whitby CC Scarborough CC Middlesbrough BC Redcar BC Thornaby BC	Cleveland CC Scarborough and Whitby CC Middlesbrough East BC Middlesbrough West BC	Richmond (Yorks) CC Thirsk and Malton CC Stockton BC (formerly Stockton-on Tees BC)		8
Yorkshire (West Riding)	44		Bradford East BC	Penistone CC Bradford North BC Bradford South BC Bradford West BC Leeds East BC Leeds North East BC Leeds North West BC Leeds South BC Leeds South East BC Sheffield, Attercliffe BC Sheffield, Brightside BC Sheffield, Hallam BC Sheffield, Heeley BC Sheffield, Hillsborough BC Sheffield, Park BC	Barkston Ash CC Colne Valley CC Dearne Valley CC Don Valley CC Goole CC Harrogate CC Hemsworth CC Normanton CC Ripon CC Rother Valley CC Shipley CC Skipton CC Sowerby CC Barnsley BC Batley and Morley BC Brighouse and Spenborough BC Dewsbury BC Doncaster BC Halifax BC Huddersfield East BC Huddersfield West BC Keighley BC Leeds West BC Pontefract and Castleford BC (formerly Pontefract BC) Pudsey BC Rotherham BC Wakefield BC York BC	43

=== Wales ===
County	Seats 1955-74	Created	Abolished	Altered	No change (or very minor change)	Seats 1974-83
Anglesey	1				Anglesey CC	1
Breconshire and Radnorshire	1				Brecon and Radnor CC	1
Caernarvonshire	2				Caernarvon CC Conway CC	2
Cardiganshire	1				Cardigan CC	1
Carmarthenshire	2				Carmarthen CC Llanelly CC	2
Denbighshire	2				Denbigh CC Wrexham CC	2
Flintshire	2				East Flint CC West Flint CC	2
Glamorganshire	16	Cardiff North West BC Rhondda BC	Rhondda East BC Rhondda West BC	Barry CC Cardiff North BC Cardiff South East BC Cardiff West BC	Aberavon CC Caerphilly CC Gower CC Neath CC Ogmore CC Pontypridd CC Aberdare BC Merthyr Tydfil CC Swansea East BC Swansea West BC	16
Merionethshire	1				Merioneth CC	1
Monmouthshire	6				Abertillery CC Bedwellty CC Ebbw Vale CC Monmouth CC Pontypool CC Newport BC	6
Montgomeryshire	1				Montgomery CC	1
Pembrokeshire	1				Pembroke CC	1

=== Scotland ===
County	Seats 1955-74	Created	Abolished	Altered	No change (or very minor change)	Seats 1974-83
Aberdeenshire	4				East Aberdeenshire CC West Aberdeenshire CC Aberdeen North BC Aberdeen South BC	4
Angus and Kincardineshire	4				North Angus and Mearns CC South Angus CC Dundee East BC Dundee West BC	4
Argyll	1				Argyll CC	1
Ayrshire and Bute	5			Central Ayrshire CC Kilmarnock CC	Ayr CC Bute and North Ayrshire CC South Ayrshire CC	5
Banffshire	1				Banff CC	1
Berwickshire and East Lothian	1				Berwick and East Lothian CC	1
Caithness and Sutherland	1				Caithness and Sutherland CC	1
Dumfriesshire	1				Dumfries CC	1
Dunbartonshire	2	Central Dunbartonshire CC		East Dunbartonshire CC West Dunbartonshire CC		3
Fife	4	Central Fife CC Dunfermline CC Kirkcaldy CC	West Fife CC Dunfermline Burghs BC Kirkcaldy Burghs BC		East Fife CC	4
Inverness-shire and Ross and Cromarty	3				Inverness CC Ross and Cromarty CC Western Isles CC	3
Kirkcudbrightshire and Wigtownshire	1				Galloway CC	1
Lanarkshire	22	East Kilbride CC Glasgow, Garscadden BC Glasgow, Queen's Park BC Motherwell and Wishaw BC	Motherwell CC Glasgow, Bridgeton BC Glasgow, Gorbals BC Glasgow, Scotstoun BC Glasgow, Woodside BC	Bothwell CC Hamilton CC Lanark CC North Lanarkshire CC Rutherglen CC Glasgow, Cathcart BC Glasgow Central BC Glasgow, Craigton BC Glasgow, Govan BC Glasgow, Hillhead BC Glasgow, Kelvingrove BC Glasgow, Maryhill BC Glasgow, Provan BC Glasgow, Shettleston BC Glasgow, Springburn BC	Coatbridge and Airdrie BC Glasgow, Pollok BC	21
Midlothian	8			Edinburgh Central BC Edinburgh, Leith BC Edinburgh North BC Edinburgh, Pentlands BC Edinburgh South BC Edinburgh West BC	Midlothian CC Edinburgh East BC	8
Moray and Nairnshire	1				Moray and Nairn CC	1
Orkney and Shetland	1				Orkney and Shetland CC	1
Perthshire and Kinross-shire	2				Kinross and West Perthshire CC Perth and East Perthshire CC	2
Renfrewshire	4	Greenock and Port Glasgow BC	Greenock BC	East Renfrewshire CC West Renfrewshire CC	Paisley BC	4
Roxburghshire, Selkirkshire and Peeblesshire	1				Roxburgh, Selkirk and Peebles CC	1
Stirlingshire and Clackmannanshire	3				Clackmannan and East Stirlingshire CC West Stirlingshire CC Stirling, Falkirk and Grangemouth BC (formerly Stirling and Falkirk Burghs BC)	3
West Lothian	1				West Lothian CC	1

=== Northern Ireland ===
County	Seats 1955-74	Created	Abolished	Altered	No change (or very minor changes)	Seats 1974-83
Antrim	6			North Antrim CC South Antrim CC Belfast East BC Belfast North BC Belfast South BC Belfast West BC		6
Armagh	1				Armagh CC	1
Down	2			North Down CC	South Down CC	2
Fermanagh and Tyrone	2				Fermanagh and South Tyrone CC Mid Ulster CC	2
Londonderry	1				Londonderry CC	1
