= Broxbourne Borough Council elections =

Local government elections in Hertfordshire, England

One third of Broxbourne Borough Council in Hertfordshire, England is elected each year, followed by one year without election. Since the last boundary changes in 2012, 30 councillors are elected from 10 wards.

== Council elections ==
- 1973 Broxbourne Borough Council election
- 1976 Broxbourne Borough Council election (New ward boundaries increased the number of wards by 1 and seats by 2)
- 1978 Broxbourne Borough Council election
- 1979 Broxbourne Borough Council election
- 1980 Broxbourne Borough Council election
- 1982 Broxbourne Borough Council election
- 1983 Broxbourne Borough Council election
- 1984 Broxbourne Borough Council election
- 1986 Broxbourne Borough Council election
- 1987 Broxbourne Borough Council election
- 1988 Broxbourne Borough Council election
- 1990 Broxbourne Borough Council election
- 1991 Broxbourne Borough Council election
- 1992 Broxbourne Borough Council election
- 1994 Broxbourne Borough Council election (Borough boundary changes took place but the number of seats remained the same)
- 1995 Broxbourne Borough Council election
- 1996 Broxbourne Borough Council election
- 1998 Broxbourne Borough Council election
- 1999 Broxbourne Borough Council election (New ward boundaries reduced the number of wards by 1 and seats by 4)
- 2000 Broxbourne Borough Council election
- 2002 Broxbourne Borough Council election
- 2003 Broxbourne Borough Council election
- 2004 Broxbourne Borough Council election
- 2006 Broxbourne Borough Council election
- 2007 Broxbourne Borough Council election
- 2008 Broxbourne Borough Council election
- 2010 Broxbourne Borough Council election
- 2011 Broxbourne Borough Council election
- 2012 Broxbourne Borough Council election (New ward boundaries reduced the number of wards by 3 and seats by 8)
- 2014 Broxbourne Borough Council election
- 2015 Broxbourne Borough Council election
- 2016 Broxbourne Borough Council election
- 2018 Broxbourne Borough Council election
- 2019 Broxbourne Borough Council election
- 2021 Broxbourne Borough Council election
- 2022 Broxbourne Borough Council election
- 2023 Broxbourne Borough Council election
- 2024 Broxbourne Borough Council election
- 2026 Broxbourne Borough Council election

== Political balance of the council ==
| Election Year | Conservative | Labour | Liberal | Alliance | Lib Dems | UKIP | BNP | Reform | Independent | Total |
|---|---|---|---|---|---|---|---|---|---|---|
| 1973 | 28 | 12 | 0 | 0 | 0 | 0 | 0 | 0 | 0 | 40 |
| 1976 | 36 | 6 | 0 | 0 | 0 | 0 | 0 | 0 | 0 | 42 |
| 1978 | 37 | 5 | 0 | 0 | 0 | 0 | 0 | 0 | 42 | |
| 1979 | 37 | 5 | 0 | 0 | 0 | 0 | 0 | 0 | 0 | 42 |
| 1980 | 34 | 7 | 1 | 0 | 0 | 0 | 0 | 0 | 42 | |
| 1982 | 33 | 7 | 0 | 2 | 0 | 0 | 0 | 0 | 0 | 42 |
| 1983 | 32 | 6 | 0 | 4 | 0 | 0 | 0 | 0 | 0 | 42 |
| 1984 | 33 | 5 | 0 | 4 | 0 | 0 | 0 | 0 | 0 | 42 |
| 1986 | 32 | 6 | 0 | 4 | 0 | 0 | 0 | 0 | 0 | 42 |
| 1987 | 34 | 6 | 0 | 2 | 0 | 0 | 0 | 0 | 0 | 42 |
| 1988 | 36 | 5 | 0 | 1 | 0 | 0 | 0 | 0 | 0 | 42 |
| 1990 | 35 | 6 | 0 | 0 | 1 | 0 | 0 | 0 | 0 | 42 |
| 1991 | 35 | 5 | 0 | 0 | 2 | 0 | 0 | 0 | 0 | 42 |
| 1992 | 36 | 4 | 0 | 0 | 2 | 0 | 0 | 0 | 0 | 42 |
| 1994 | 33 | 5 | 0 | 0 | 4 | 0 | 0 | 0 | 0 | 42 |
| 1995 | 27 | 11 | 0 | 0 | 4 | 0 | 0 | 0 | 42 | |
| 1996 | 24 | 14 | 0 | 0 | 4 | 0 | 0 | 0 | 0 | 42 |
| 1998 | 31 | 11 | 0 | 0 | 0 | 0 | 0 | 0 | 0 | 42 |
| 1999 | 33 | 5 | 0 | 0 | 0 | 0 | 0 | 0 | 0 | 38 |
| 2000 | 35 | 3 | 0 | 0 | 0 | 0 | 0 | 0 | 0 | 38 |
| 2002 | 35 | 2 | 0 | 0 | 0 | 0 | 0 | 0 | 1 (Note: Bury Green Residents.) | 38 |
| 2003 | 34 | 2 | 0 | 0 | 0 | 0 | 1 | 0 | 1 | 38 |
| 2004 | 34 | 2 | 0 | 0 | 0 | 0 | 1 | 0 | 1 | 38 |
| 2006 | 35 | 2 | 0 | 0 | 0 | 0 | 1 | 0 | 0 | 38 |
| 2007 | 36 | 2 | 0 | 0 | 0 | 0 | 0 | 0 | 0 | 38 |
| 2008 | 35 | 3 | 0 | 0 | 0 | 0 | 0 | 0 | 0 | 38 |
| 2010 | 35 | 3 | 0 | 0 | 0 | 0 | 0 | 0 | 0 | 38 |
| 2011 | 35 | 3 | 0 | 0 | 0 | 0 | 0 | 0 | 0 | 38 |
| 2012 | 27 | 3 | 0 | 0 | 0 | 0 | 0 | 0 | 0 | 30 |
| 2014 | 27 | 3 | 0 | 0 | 0 | 1 | 0 | 0 | 0 | 30 |
| 2015 | 27 | 3 | 0 | 0 | 0 | 1 | 0 | 0 | 0 | 30 |
| 2016 | 27 | 3 | 0 | 0 | 0 | 1 | 0 | 0 | 0 | 30 |
| 2018 | 27 | 3 | 0 | 0 | 0 | 0 | 0 | 0 | 0 | 30 |
| 2019 | 27 | 3 | 0 | 0 | 0 | 0 | 0 | 0 | 0 | 30 |
| 2021 | 27 | 3 | 0 | 0 | 0 | 0 | 0 | 0 | 0 | 30 |
| 2022 | 27 | 3 | 0 | 0 | 0 | 0 | 0 | 0 | 0 | 30 |
| 2023 | 27 | 3 | 0 | 0 | 0 | 0 | 0 | 0 | 0 | 30 |
| 2024 | 27 | 3 | 0 | 0 | 0 | 0 | 0 | 0 | 0 | 30 |
| 2026 | 25 | 3 | 0 | 0 | 0 | 0 | 0 | 2 | 0 | 30 |

== Results maps ==
2002 results map

2003 results map

2004 results map

2006 results map

2007 results map

2008 results map

2010 results map

2012 results map

2014 results map

2015 results map

2016 results map

2018 results map

2019 results map

2021 results map

2022 results map

2023 results map

2024 results map

2026 results map

== By-election results ==
=== 1982-1986 ===
Hoddesdon Town By-Election 3 March 1983
| Party | Candidate | Votes | % | ±% |
|---|---|---|---|---|
| Alliance | Julian Gould | 1,060 | 51.86 | |
| Conservative | Charles Thompson | 755 | 36.94 | |
| Labour | Janet Batsleer | 229 | 11.20 | |
| Majority | | 305 | | |
| Turnout | | 2,044 | 44.80 | |
| Alliance hold | | Swing | | |

Wormley / Turnford By-Election 8 November 1984
| Party | Candidate | Votes | % | ±% |
|---|---|---|---|---|
| Conservative | Beryl Poole | 470 | 50.92 | |
| Labour | Mark Farrington | 302 | 32.72 | |
| Alliance | Julie Cooper | 151 | 16.36 | |
| Majority | | 168 | | |
| Turnout | | 923 | 21.80 | |
| Conservative hold | | Swing | | |

Cheshunt Central By-Election 4 July 1985
| Party | Candidate | Votes | % | ±% |
|---|---|---|---|---|
| Conservative | Graham Brewster | 535 | 43.50 | |
| Alliance | Peter Huse | 468 | 38.05 | |
| Labour | Mark Bryant | 227 | 18.45 | |
| Majority | | 67 | | |
| Turnout | | 1,230 | 33.80 | |
| Conservative hold | | Swing | | |

Rosedale By-Election 4 July 1985
| Party | Candidate | Votes | % | ±% |
|---|---|---|---|---|
| Alliance | David Lefley | 372 | 40.83 | |
| Conservative | Michael Lavender | 292 | 32.06 | |
| Labour | Mark Farrington | 247 | 27.11 | |
| Majority | | 80 | | |
| Turnout | | 911 | 38.50 | |
| Alliance hold | | Swing | | |

Flamstead End By-Election 21 November 1985
| Party | Candidate | Votes | % | ±% |
|---|---|---|---|---|
| Conservative | Gordon Greenwood | 511 | 48.44 | |
| Alliance | Malcolm Aitken | 349 | 33.08 | |
| Labour | Paul Spychal | 195 | 18.48 | |
| Majority | | 162 | | |
| Turnout | | 1,055 | 23.10 | |
| Conservative hold | | Swing | | |

=== 1986-1990 ===
Theobalds By-Election 29 October 1987
| Party | Candidate | Votes | % | ±% |
|---|---|---|---|---|
| Conservative | Victor Bellingham | 427 | 54.75 | |
| Labour | Lester Hicking | 254 | 32.56 | |
| SLD | Kenneth King | 99 | 12.69 | |
| Majority | | 173 | | |
| Turnout | | 780 | 18.70 | |
| Conservative hold | | Swing | | |

Theobalds By-Election 4 May 1989
| Party | Candidate | Votes | % | ±% |
|---|---|---|---|---|
| Conservative | Patricia Morris | 753 | 52.15 | |
| Labour | Lester Hicking | 522 | 36.15 | |
| SLD | Paul Seeby | 169 | 11.70 | |
| Majority | | 231 | 34.90 | |
| Turnout | | 1,444 | 36.40 | |
| Conservative hold | | Swing | | |

Waltham Cross North By-Election 4 May 1989
| Party | Candidate | Votes | % | ±% |
|---|---|---|---|---|
| Conservative | Mandy Hayward | 587 | 51.99 | |
| Labour | Malcolm Theobald | 416 | 36.85 | |
| SLD | Anthony Stokes | 126 | 11.16 | |
| Majority | | 171 | | |
| Turnout | | 1,129 | 36.40 | |
| Conservative hold | | Swing | | |

=== 1994-1998 ===
Waltham Cross North By-Election 1 May 1997
| Party | Candidate | Votes | % | ±% |
|---|---|---|---|---|
| Conservative | Charles Tranham | 1,055 | 49.4 | −7.0 |
| Labour | Alan McCole | 888 | 41.6 | +3.8 |
| Liberal Democrats | Jacqueline Barton | 192 | 9.0 | +3.2 |
| Majority | | 167 | 7.8 | |
| Turnout | | 2,135 | | |
| Conservative gain from Labour | | Swing | | |

=== 1998-2002 ===
Goffs Oak By-Election 9 July 1998
| Party | Candidate | Votes | % | ±% |
|---|---|---|---|---|
| Conservative | Jacqueline De Pace | 569 | 75.0 | +3.3 |
| Labour | Linda Dambrauskas | 131 | 17.2 | +4.4 |
| Liberal Democrats | Jacqueline Barton | 42 | 5.5 | −1.7 |
| Independent Conservative | Christopher Stone | 17 | 2.2 | −6.1 |
| Majority | | 438 | 57.8 | |
| Turnout | | 759 | | |
| Conservative hold | | Swing | | |

Cheshunt Central By-Election 16 November 2000
| Party | Candidate | Votes | % | ±% |
|---|---|---|---|---|
| Conservative | Moyra O'Neill | 442 | 60.1 | +0.1 |
| Labour | Carolyn Iles | 198 | 26.9 | +4.1 |
| Liberal Democrats | Nicholas Garton | 54 | 7.3 | −3.0 |
| BNP | John Cope | 42 | 5.7 | −1.3 |
| Majority | | 244 | 33.2 | |
| Turnout | | 736 | 12.9 | |
| Conservative hold | | Swing | | |

Theobalds By-Election 22 November 2001
| Party | Candidate | Votes | % | ±% |
|---|---|---|---|---|
| Conservative | Alan Smith | 551 | 60.4 | −8.8 |
| Labour | Richard Greenhill | 307 | 33.6 | +2.8 |
| BNP | John Cope | 55 | 6.0 | +6.0 |
| Majority | | 244 | 26.8 | |
| Turnout | | 913 | 18.0 | |
| Conservative hold | | Swing | | |

=== 2002-2006 ===
Rosedale By-Election 5 May 2005
| Party | Candidate | Votes | % | ±% |
|---|---|---|---|---|
| Conservative | David Lewis | 799 | 41.5 | |
| BNP | Gary Horsley | 507 | 26.3 | |
| Labour | Cherry Robbins | 426 | 22.1 | |
| Liberal Democrats | Peter Huse | 193 | 10.0 | |
| Majority | | 292 | 15.2 | |
| Turnout | | 1,925 | 57.9 | |
| Conservative hold | | Swing | | |

=== 2010-2014 ===
Cheshunt Central By-Election 30 June 2011
| Party | Candidate | Votes | % | ±% |
|---|---|---|---|---|
| Conservative | Tony Siracusa | 742 | 53.11 | |
| Labour | Richard Greenhill | 481 | 34.43 | |
| UKIP | David Platt | 88 | 6.30 | |
| Independent | Joanne Welch | 62 | 4.44 | |
| Liberal Democrats | Peter Huse | 24 | 1.72 | |
| Majority | | 261 | | |
| Turnout | | 1,397 | 24.80 | |
| Conservative hold | | Swing | | |

=== 2014-2018 ===
Waltham Cross by-Election 9 March 2017
| Party | Candidate | Votes | % | ±% |
|---|---|---|---|---|
| Conservative | Patsy Spears | 650 | 41.0 | −3.5 |
| Labour | Christian Durugo | 646 | 40.8 | −14.8 |
| UKIP | Steve Coster | 200 | 12.6 | N/A |
| Liberal Democrats | Brendan Wyer | 89 | 5.6 | N/A |
| Majority | | 4 | 0.2 | |
| Turnout | | | 20.85 | |
| Conservative gain from Labour | | Swing | | |
