= Ilford (ward) =

- Former electoral ward for the Redbridge London Borough Council
- Borough: Redbridge
- County: Greater London
- Population: 11,430 (1966 estimate)
- Electorate: 8,660 (1964); 8,198 (1968); 8,262 (1971); 8,205 (1974)
- Major settlements: Ilford
- Area: 334.9 acres (1.355 km^{2})

Former electoral ward
- Created: 1965
- Abolished: 1978
- Councillors: 3

External image
- Map showing Ilford ward boundaries

Ilford was an electoral ward in the London Borough of Redbridge from 1965 to 1978. The ward was first used in the 1964 elections and last used for the 1974 elections. It returned three councillors to Redbridge London Borough Council. For elections to the Greater London Council, the ward was part of the Redbridge electoral division from 1965 and then the Ilford South division from 1973.

== List of councillors ==
| Term | Councillor | Party |
|---|---|---|
| 1964–1968 | L. Fallaize | Labour |
| 1964–1968 | D. Carradice | Labour |
| 1964–1968 | J. Ryder | Labour |
| 1968–1971 | M. Clark | Conservative |
| 1968–1971 | L. Golding | Conservative |
| 1968–1971 | K. Albert-Richards | Conservative |
| 1971–1974 | P. Connellan | Labour |
| 1971–1974 | H. Lewis | Labour |
| 1971–1974 | L. Emons | Labour |
| 1974–1978 | K. Axon | Labour |
| 1974–1978 | M. Batton | Labour |
| 1974–1978 | S. Mather | Labour |

== Redbridge council elections ==
=== 1974 election ===
The election took place on 2 May 1974.

1974 Redbridge London Borough Council election: Ilford (3)
| Party | Candidate | Votes | % | ±% |
|---|---|---|---|---|
| Labour | K. Axon | 1,396 | | |
| Labour | M. Batton | 1,378 | | |
| Labour | S. Mather | 1,279 | | |
| Conservative | A. Branscombe | 661 | | |
| Conservative | P. Cottrell | 651 | | |
| Conservative | P. Crellin | 626 | | |
| Residents | P. Kavanagh | 301 | | |
| Liberal | J. Boxell | 277 | | |
| Liberal | D. Jackson | 232 | | |
| Liberal | J. Alexander | 231 | | |
| Turnout | | | | |
| Labour hold | | Swing | | |
| Labour hold | | Swing | | |
| Labour hold | | Swing | | |

=== 1971 election ===
The election took place on 13 May 1971.

1971 Redbridge London Borough Council election: Ilford (3)
| Party | Candidate | Votes | % | ±% |
|---|---|---|---|---|
| Labour | P. Connellan | 1,734 | | |
| Labour | H. Lewis | 1,660 | | |
| Labour | L. Emons | 1,629 | | |
| Conservative | M. Clark | 840 | | |
| Conservative | P. Cottrell | 815 | | |
| Conservative | D. Perril | 782 | | |
| Liberal | J. Newland | 168 | | |
| Liberal | D. Jackson | 159 | | |
| Liberal | A. Train | 152 | | |
| National Front | W. Bouverie | 121 | | |
| Communist | G. Devine | 91 | | |
| Turnout | | | | |
| Labour gain from Conservative | | Swing | | |
| Labour gain from Conservative | | Swing | | |
| Labour gain from Conservative | | Swing | | |

=== 1968 election ===
The election took place on 9 May 1968.

1968 Redbridge London Borough Council election: Ilford (3)
| Party | Candidate | Votes | % | ±% |
|---|---|---|---|---|
| Conservative | M. Clark | 1,289 | | |
| Conservative | L. Golding | 1,230 | | |
| Conservative | K. Albert-Richards | 1,133 | | |
| Labour | J. Ryder | 749 | | |
| Labour | D. Bonsor | 720 | | |
| Labour | M. Powers | 681 | | |
| Liberal | H. Price | 390 | | |
| Liberal | J. Newland | 372 | | |
| Liberal | A. Train | 357 | | |
| National Front | W. Partridge | 229 | | |
| Communist | P. Devine | 103 | | |
| Turnout | | | | |
| Conservative gain from Labour | | Swing | | |
| Conservative gain from Labour | | Swing | | |
| Conservative gain from Labour | | Swing | | |

=== 1964 election ===
The election took place on 7 May 1964.

1964 Redbridge London Borough Council election: Ilford (3)
| Party | Candidate | Votes | % | ±% |
|---|---|---|---|---|
| Labour | L. Fallaize | 1,538 | | |
| Labour | D. Carradice | 1,450 | | |
| Labour | J. Ryder | 1,417 | | |
| Conservative | B. Cooper | 1,067 | | |
| Conservative | T. Bozet | 1,006 | | |
| Conservative | A. Barker | 961 | | |
| Liberal | K. Jaeger | 445 | | |
| Liberal | J. Malcolm | 406 | | |
| Liberal | K. Timmings | 362 | | |
| Communist | P. Devine | 106 | | |
| Turnout | | | | |
| Labour win (new seat) | | | | |
| Labour win (new seat) | | | | |
| Labour win (new seat) | | | | |
