= 2026 Broxbourne Borough Council election =

2026 english local government election

- 7 May 2026

10 out of 30 seats to Broxbourne Borough Council 16 seats needed for a majority

	First party	Second party	Third party
Leader	Corina Gander	Carol Bowman	Siobhan Monaghan
Party	Conservative	Labour	Reform
Leader's seat	Goffs Oak	Waltham Cross	Cheshunt South and Theobalds (defeated)
Last election	27 seats, 50.4%	3 seats, 30.5%	0 seats, 0.0%
Seats before	25	3	2
Seats won	7	1	2
Seats after	25	3	2
Seat change	▼2	Steady	▲2
- Results by ward
Leader before election
Corina Gander
Conservative
Leader after election
Corina Gander
Conservative

The 2026 Broxbourne Borough Council election was held on 7 May 2026 to elect members to Broxbourne Borough Council. It was held on the same day as other local elections. The election was the last election held in Broxbourne before local government reorganisation.

The Conservatives retained their majority on the council.

== Background ==
In the 2024 council election, the Conservative Party held 9 out of 10 seats that were up for election, maintaining their majority and control of the council. The Labour Party held the seat of Waltham Cross. In the 2024 general election, Charles Walker, the incumbent Conservative MP of Broxbourne, stood down. Lewis Cocking, the leader of Broxbourne Borough Council, was selected as the Conservative candidate to replace Walker and elected with a majority of 2,858 votes. Cocking was succeeded as leader of the council by councillor Mark Mills-Bishop of Goffs Oak in May 2024. In February 2025, councillors Giles Hall of Flamstead End and Siobhan Monaghan of Cheshunt South and Theobalds left the Conservative Party and joined Reform UK. Mills-Bishop called for Hall and Monaghan to resign and face by-elections. Mills-Bishop stood down as leader in May 2025 and was succeeded by councillor Corina Gander of Goffs Oak.

== Election results ==
2026 Broxbourne Borough Council election
Party	This election				Full council			This election		
Party	Candidates	Seats	Net	Seats %	Other	Total	Total %	Votes	Votes %	+/−
Conservative	{{{candidates}}}	7	Steady	70.0	18	25	83.3	11,018	39.6	–10.8
Labour	{{{candidates}}}	1	Steady	10.0	2	3	10.0	3,119	11.2	–19.3
Reform	{{{candidates}}}	2	Steady	20.0	0	2	6.7	9,325	33.5	N/A
Green	{{{candidates}}}	0	Steady	0.0	0	0	0	3,277	11.8	+2.0
Liberal Democrats	{{{candidates}}}	0	Steady	0.0	0	0	0	988	3.5	-2.7
TUSC	{{{candidates}}}	0	Steady	0.0	0	0	0	113	0.4	-0.8

== Candidates by ward ==
=== Broxbourne and Hoddesdon South ===
Broxbourne and Hoddesdon South
Party	Candidate	Votes	%	±%
Conservative	Mark Perkins	1,666	50.0	−5.3
Reform	Christopher Hall	911	27.3	N/A
Green	Sally Kemp	375	11.3	−13.3
Labour	Rob Perry	214	6.4	−5.1
Liberal Democrats	Kiran Thomas	165	5.0	−0.1
Turnout		3,331		
Conservative hold		Swing		

=== Cheshunt North ===
Cheshunt North
Party	Candidate	Votes	%	±%
Conservative	Patsy Spears	957	36.9	−11.4
Reform	Cameron Delaney	860	33.2	N/A
Labour	Lisa Newby	346	13.3	−26.2
Green	Skylar Johnson	310	12.0	+7.3
Liberal Democrats	Kostas Inchenko	101	3.9	−1.6
TUSC	Josh Asker	20	0.8	−1.2
Turnout		2,594		
Conservative hold		Swing		

=== Cheshunt South and Theobalds ===
Cheshunt South and Theobalds
Party	Candidate	Votes	%	±%
Conservative	Erin Celebi	985	40.3	−3.5
Reform	Siobhan Monaghan	700	28.6	N/A
Labour	Zahra Spencer	378	15.5	−25.4
Green	Florine Nikound Imb	344	14.1	+7.1
TUSC	Bea Gardner Asker	39	1.6	+0.1
Turnout		2,446		
Conservative hold		Swing		

=== Flamstead End ===
Flamstead End
Party	Candidate	Votes	%	±%
Conservative	George Nicolaou	1,061	41.7	−18.3
Reform	James Beatty	907	35.6	N/A
Green	Jacky Carr	278	10.9	+3.2
Labour	Ian Dust	209	8.2	−17.3
Liberal Democrats	Peter Kemp	87	3.4	−1.5
TUSC	Aaron Smith	4	0.2	−1.6
Turnout		2,546		
Conservative hold		Swing		

=== Goffs Oak ===
Goffs Oak
Party	Candidate	Votes	%	±%
Conservative	Shenis Hassan	1,475	43.5	−14.2
Reform	Mandy Hayward	1,260	37.2	N/A
Green	Chris Whitehead	297	8.8	+2.0
Labour	Roy Wareham	186	5.5	−11.6
Liberal Democrats	David Payne	171	5.0	−13.3
Turnout		3,389		
Conservative hold		Swing		

=== Hoddesdon North ===
Hoddesdon North
Party	Candidate	Votes	%	±%
Conservative	John Perkins	1,405	44.3	−11.5
Reform	Joe Bertolone	1,168	36.8	N/A
Green	James McQuillan	243	7.7	−0.5
Labour	Peter Skinner	224	7.1	−16.3
Liberal Democrats	Gerard Dugdill	132	4.2	−1.1
Turnout		3,172		
Conservative hold		Swing		

=== Hoddesdon Town and Rye Park ===
Hoddesdon Town and Rye Park
Party	Candidate	Votes	%	±%
Reform	Giorgio Daniel	990	40.5	N/A
Conservative	Kevin Andrews	793	32.4	−16.2
Green	Stephen Hawcroft	284	11.6	−0.7
Labour Co-op	Aeden Rooney	241	9.9	−19.8
Liberal Democrats	Tim Vizer	127	5.2	−1.3
TUSC	Pauline Sulman	10	0.4	−2.5
Turnout		2,445		
Reform gain from Conservative		Swing		

=== Rosedale and Bury Green ===
Rosedale and Bury Green
Party	Candidate	Votes	%	±%
Reform	Giles Hall	912	36.2	N/A
Conservative	Suzanne Anstee	895	35.5	−18.7
Green	Laura Frost	342	13.6	+4.0
Labour	Ed Dragusin	293	11.6	−20.0
Liberal Democrats	Neville Townsend	78	3.1	−1.5
Turnout		2,520		
Reform gain from Conservative		Swing		

=== Waltham Cross ===
Waltham Cross
Party	Candidate	Votes	%	±%
Labour	Carol Bowman	745	28.7	−28.5
Reform	Carole Barrett	728	28.1	N/A
Conservative	Yinka Sonubi	514	19.8	−7.6
Green	Owen Brett	457	17.6	+11.2
Liberal Democrats	Fabio Bonfante	127	4.9	−1.4
TUSC	Christine Thomas	23	0.9	−1.7
Turnout		2,594		
Labour hold		Swing		

=== Wormley and Turnford ===
Wormley and Turnford
Party	Candidate	Votes	%	±%
Conservative	Rowan Quant	1,267	45.2	−10.9
Reform	Theo Savidis	889	31.7	N/A
Green	Ellie Austen	347	12.4	+4.8
Labour	Madeline McFadden	283	10.1	−20.9
TUSC	Robert Landon	17	0.6	−0.9
Turnout		2,803		
Conservative hold		Swing		
