= Park (Redbridge ward) =

- Former electoral ward for the Redbridge London Borough Council
- Borough: Redbridge
- County: Greater London
- Population: 11,720 (1966 estimate)
- Electorate: 9,287 (1964); 8,845 (1968); 8,942 (1971); 8,670 (1974)
- Major settlements: Ilford
- Area: 458.8 acres (1.857 km^{2})

Former electoral ward
- Created: 1965
- Abolished: 1978
- Councillors: 3

Park was an electoral ward in the London Borough of Redbridge from 1965 to 1978. The ward was first used in the 1964 elections and last used for the 1974 elections. It returned three councillors to Redbridge London Borough Council. For elections to the Greater London Council, the ward was part of the Redbridge electoral division from 1965 and then the Ilford South division from 1973. The ward covered the area around Valentines Park.

== List of councillors ==
Term	Councillor	Party
1964–1968	E. Earey	Conservative
1964–1974	A. Toms	Conservative
1964–1968	A. Branscombe	Conservative
1968–1974	J. Smith	Conservative
1968–1969	B. Tovey	Conservative
1969–1978	C. Annal	Conservative

== Redbridge council elections ==
External image
- Map showing Park ward boundaries

=== 1974 election ===
The election took place on 2 May 1974.

1974 Redbridge London Borough Council election: Park (3)
Party	Candidate	Votes	%	±%
Conservative	J. Smith	1,431		
Conservative	C. Annal	1,418		
Conservative	A. Toms	1,384		
Labour	J. Blay	980		
Labour	S. Marchant	971		
Labour	D. Fenton	966		
Liberal	J. Newland	428		
Liberal	M. Newman	404		
Liberal	P. Wright	377		
Communist	M. Woddis	106		
Turnout				
Conservative hold		Swing		
Conservative hold		Swing		
Conservative hold		Swing		

=== 1971 election ===
The election took place on 13 May 1971.

1971 Redbridge London Borough Council election: Park (3)
Party	Candidate	Votes	%	±%
Conservative	J. Smith	1,455		
Conservative	C. Annal	1,440		
Conservative	A. Toms	1,383		
Labour	S. Brooks	1291		
Labour	W. Burgess	1258		
Labour	A. Willson	1249		
Liberal	T. Needham	328		
Liberal	G. McDonough	297		
Liberal	P. Wright	288		
Communist	E. Woddis	99		
Turnout				
Conservative hold		Swing		
Conservative hold		Swing		
Conservative hold		Swing		

=== 1969 by-election ===
The by-election took place on 1 May 1969.

1969 Park by-election
Party	Candidate	Votes	%	±%
Conservative	C. Annal	1,646		
Labour	R. Spack	550		
Liberal	T. Needham	386		
National Front	W. Partridge	81		
Communist	E. Woddis	58		
Turnout			31.2	
Conservative hold		Swing		

=== 1968 election ===
The election took place on 9 May 1968.

1968 Redbridge London Borough Council election: Park (3)
Party	Candidate	Votes	%	±%
Conservative	J. Smith	2,066		
Conservative	B. Tovey	2,063		
Conservative	A. Toms	2,042		
Labour	R. Spack	605		
Labour	G. Gooding	602		
Liberal	G. McDonough	591		
Liberal	G. Wilson	591		
Labour	L. Carton	585		
Liberal	T. Needham	573		
Communist	E. Woddis	100		
Turnout				
Conservative hold		Swing		
Conservative hold		Swing		
Conservative hold		Swing		

=== 1964 election ===
The election took place on 7 May 1964.

1964 Redbridge London Borough Council election: Park (3)
Party	Candidate	Votes	%	±%
Conservative	E. Earey	1,680		
Conservative	A. Toms	1,607		
Conservative	A. Branscombe	1,518		
Liberal	G. Frost	1,047		
Liberal	S. Cannon	1,028		
Labour	S. Brooks	978		
Liberal	G. McDonough	951		
Labour	S. Haywood	927		
Labour	P. Condon	880		
Communist	E. Burke	120		
Turnout				
Conservative win (new seat)				
Conservative win (new seat)				
Conservative win (new seat)				
