= Marion Roe =

British politician

Dame Marion Roe DBE

Member of Parliament for Broxbourne
- In office 9 June 1983 – 11 April 2005
- Preceded by: Constituency Established
- Succeeded by: Charles Walker

Personal details
- Born: 15 July 1936 (age 90) London
- Party: Conservative
- Spouse: James Kenneth Roe (m. 1958)

Dame Marion Audrey Roe DBE (born 15 July 1936 in London) is a former Conservative Party politician and councillor in the United Kingdom, who served as the Member of Parliament for Broxbourne from 1983 to 2005.

== Early life and career ==
She went to the independent Bromley High School for Girls in Bickley, then the independent Croydon High School. She studied at the English School of Languages in Vevey in Switzerland.

Roe served on the Greater London Council, representing Ilford North.

== Parliamentary career ==
She unsuccessfully contested the Barking constituency at the 1979 general election, achieving a 14% swing. At the next election in 1983, Roe became the Member of Parliament for Broxbourne.

In 1985, Roe introduced a private member's bill to prohibit female genital mutilation. With cross-party support, Roe's Bill became law in 1985 as the Prohibition of Female Circumcision Act.

She was a junior environment minister from 1987 to 1988. Later, Roe chaired the Health and Social Care Select Committee from 1992 until 1997 and the Administration Committee from 1997 to 2005. A eurosceptic, she was on the council of the right-wing Conservative Way Forward group.

Roe was created Dame Commander of the Order of the British Empire in 2004, for services to Parliament before stepping down at the 2005 general election.

== Later life ==
Roe has been a Vice-President of Capel Manor College since 1994.

Since 2001, Roe has chaired the National Council for Child Health and Wellbeing (NCCHW). The NCCHW comprises more than 50 professional groups focused on improving the health and welfare of children and young people across the UK and meets four times a year to identify current issues causing concern in the media or within Parliament.

Following her retirement, Roe established the Dame Marion Roe Young Citizen of the Year award, part of the annual Broxbourne Youth Awards celebrating the achievements of young people from the Borough of Broxbourne.

She has continued to support the Conservative Party by running a public speaking training programme known as the 'Roe Project'. The programme is open to all councillors and prospective candidates.

In 2005 she became patron of Hospices of Hope, a UK charity dedicated to supporting the development of palliative and end of life care in South and East Europe.

In 2010 she became chair of the trustees of the National Benevolent Fund for the Aged.

She was interviewed in 2013 as part of The History of Parliament's oral history project.

== Personal life ==
She married James Kenneth Roe in 1958 and had three children, Jane, William and Phillippa.

Philippa Roe, Baroness Couttie was the Leader of Westminster City Council and was a member of the House of Lords as a Conservative from 2016 until her death in 2022.

Parliament of the United Kingdom
New constituency	Member of Parliament for Broxbourne; 1983–2005	Succeeded by Charles Walker
