= Procedure Committee =

The Procedure Committee is a select committee of the House of Commons in the Parliament of the United Kingdom. The remit of the committee is to consider the practice and procedure of the House in the conduct of public business. The committee is governed by Standing Order number 147, which sets out its remit, powers, and the number of members.

== Chairs ==
Committee chairs include those listed below.

| Name | Start | End | Party | Constituency |
|---|---|---|---|---|
| Peter Emery | 9 June 1983 | 21 March 1997 | Conservative | Honiton |
| Nicholas Winterton | 31 July 1997 | 9 November 2005 | Conservative | Macclesfield |
| Greg Knight | 9 November 2005 | 17 October 2012 | Conservative | East Yorkshire |
| Charles Walker | 17 October 2012 | 6 November 2019 | Conservative | Broxbourne |
| Karen Bradley | 29 January 2020 | 30 May 2024 | Conservative | Staffordshire Moorlands |
| Cat Smith | 11 September 2024 | present | Labour | Lancaster and Wyre |

== Membership ==
Membership of the committee is as follows:

| Member | Party | Constituency |
|---|---|---|
| Cat Smith MP (Chair) | Labour | Lancaster and Wyre |
| James Asser MP | Labour | West Ham and Beckton |
| Maureen Burke MP | Labour | Glasgow North East |
| Bambos Charalambous MP | Labour | Southgate and Wood Green |
| Christopher Chope MP | Conservative | Christchurch |
| Lee Dillon MP | Liberal Democrats | Newbury |
| Gill Furniss MP | Labour | Sheffield Brightside and Hillsborough |
| Tracy Gilbert MP | Labour | Edinburgh North and Leith |
| Gurinder Josan MP | Labour | Smethwick |
| John Lamont MP | Conservative | Berwickshire, Roxburgh and Selkirk |
| Katrina Murray MP | Labour | Cumbernauld and Kirkintilloch |
| Lee Pitcher MP | Labour | Doncaster East and the Isle of Axholme |
| Jeff Smith MP | Labour | Manchester Withington |
| Kenneth Stevenson MP | Labour | Airdrie and Shotts |
| Gavin Williamson MP | Conservative | Stone, Great Wyrley and Penkridge |
| Martin Wrigley MP | Liberal Democrats | Newton Abbot |

=== Changes since 2024 ===
| Date | Outgoing Member & Party | Constituency | → | New Member & Party | Constituency | Source |
|---|---|---|---|---|---|---|
| 27 January 2025 | Frank McNally MP (Labour) | Coatbridge and Bellshill | → | David Baines MP (Labour) | St Helens North | Hansard |
| 30 June 2025 | Richard Holden MP (Conservative) | Basildon and Billericay | → | Gavin Williamson MP (Conservative) | Stone, Great Wyrley and Penkridge | Hansard |
| 15 September 2025 | Joy Morrissey MP (Conservative) | Beaconsfield | → | John Lamont MP (Conservative) | Berwickshire, Roxburgh and Selkirk | Hansard |
| 1 December 2025 | David Baines MP (Labour) | St Helens North | → | Katrina Murray MP (Labour) | Cumbernauld and Kirkintilloch | Hansard |
| 1 December 2025 | Graeme Downie MP (Labour) | Dunfermline and Dollar | → | Kenneth Stevenson MP (Labour) | Airdrie and Shotts | Hansard |
| 7 September 2026 | Tom Morrison MP (Liberal Democrats) | Cheadle | → | Martin Wrigley MP (Liberal Democrats) | Newton Abbot | Hansard |
| 11 November 2026 | Michael Wheeler MP (Labour) | Worsley and Eccles | → | Jeff Smith MP (Labour) | Manchester Withington | Hansard |
| 16 November 2026 | Mary Kelly Foy MP (Labour) | City of Durham | → | Maureen Burke MP (Labour) | Glasgow North East | Hansard |

== 58th parliament ==
In the 58th parliament, the membership of the committee was the following:

| Member | Party | Constituency |
|---|---|---|
| Dame Karen Bradley (Chair) | Conservative | Staffordshire Moorlands |
| Nickie Aiken | Conservative | Cities of London and Westminster |
| Jack Brereton | Conservative | Stoke-on-Trent South |
| Bambos Charalambous | Labour | Enfield Southgate |
| Sir Christopher Chope | Conservative | Christchurch |
| Samantha Dixon | Labour | City of Chester |
| Chris Elmore | Labour | Ogmore |
| Patrick Grady | Scottish National Party | Glasgow North |
| James Gray | Conservative | North Wiltshire |
| Kevan Jones | Labour | Durham North |
| Nigel Mills | Conservative | Amber Valley |
| Douglas Ross | Conservative | Moray |
| James Sunderland | Conservative | Bracknell |
| Owen Thompson | Scottish National Party | Midlothian |
| Liz Twist | Labour | Blaydon |
| Suzanne Webb | Conservative | Stourbridge |
| William Wragg | Conservative | Hazel Grove |

=== Changes ===
| Date | Outgoing Member & Party | Constituency | → | New Member & Party | Constituency | Source |
|---|---|---|---|---|---|---|
| 9 March 2020 | Kieran Mullan MP (Conservative) | Crewe and Nantwich | → | Anthony Mangnall MP (Conservative) | Totnes | Hansard |
| 15 June 2020 | Kate Hollern MP (Labour) | Blackburn | → | Angela Eagle MP (Labour) | Wallasey | Hansard |
| 15 June 2020 | Alex Norris MP (Labour) | Nottingham North | → | Kevan Jones MP (Labour) | North Durham | Hansard |

== 57th parliament ==
In the 57th parliament, the members of the committee was the following:

| Member | Party | Constituency |
|---|---|---|
| Charles Walker MP (Chair) | Conservative | Broxbourne |
| Bob Blackman MP | Conservative | Harrow East |
| Peter Bone MP | Conservative | Wellingborough |
| Gareth Snell MP | Labour Co-op | Stoke-on-Trent Central |
| Bambos Charalambous MP | Labour | Enfield Southgate |
| Sir Christopher Chope MP | Conservative | Christchurch |
| Alison Thewliss MP | Scottish National Party | Glasgow Central |
| Nic Dakin MP | Labour | Scunthorpe |
| Chris Elmore MP | Labour | Ogmore |
| Helen Goodman MP | Labour | Bishop Auckland |
| Ranil Jayawardena MP | Conservative | North East Hampshire |
| David Linden MP | Scottish National Party | Glasgow East |
| Melanie Onn MP | Labour | Great Grimsby |
| Nick Smith MP | Labour | Blaenau Gwent |
| William Wragg MP | Conservative | Hazel Grove |
| Rt. Hon Sir David Evennett MP | Conservative | Bexleyheath and Crayford |
| Rt. Hon Sir Edward Leigh MP | Conservative | Gainsborough |

=== Changes ===
Occasionally, the House of Commons orders changes to be made in terms of membership of select committees, as proposed by the Committee of Selection. Such changes are shown below.

| Date | Outgoing Member & Party | Constituency | → | New Member & Party | Constituency | Source |
|---|---|---|---|---|---|---|
| 9 June 2010 | Greg Knight MP (Conservative – East Yorkshire) elected Chair | | | | | Hansard |
| 26 July 2010 | Initial members elected | | | | | Hansard |
| 1 March 2011 | Mike Wood MP (Labour) | East Yorkshire | → | Helen Goodman MP (Labour) | Bishop Auckland | Hansard |
| 21 March 2011 | Angela Smith MP (Labour) | Penistone and Stocksbridge | → | Thomas Docherty MP (Labour) | Dunfermline and West Fife | Hansard |
| 1 April 2011 | Sir Peter Soulsby MP (Labour) | Leicester South | → | Vacant | | Vote and Proceedings |
| 11 October 2011 | Bridget Phillipson MP (Labour) | Houghton and Sunderland South | → | Nic Dakin MP (Labour) | Scunthorpe | Hansard |
| 31 October 2011 | Andrew Percy MP (Conservative) | Brigg and Goole | → | Karen Bradley MP (Conservative) | Staffordshire Moorlands | Hansard |
| 6 September 2012 | Chair: Greg Knight MP (Conservative) | East Yorkshire | → | Vacant | | Hansard |
| 17 October 2012 | Vacant | | → | Chair: Charles Walker MP (Conservative) | Broxbourne | Hansard |
| 5 November 2012 | Karen Bradley MP (Conservative) | Staffordshire Moorlands | → | Martin Vickers MP (Conservative) | Cleethorpes | Hansard |

== See also ==
- Parliamentary committees of the United Kingdom
