= Wanstead and Woodford =

Wanstead and Woodford may refer to:

- Municipal Borough of Wanstead and Woodford
- Wanstead and Woodford (UK Parliament constituency)
- Wanstead and Woodford (electoral division), Greater London Council
