= 2003 Broxbourne Borough Council election =

2003 UK local government election

Results of the 2003 Broxbourne Borough Council election

The Broxbourne Council election, 2003 was held to elect council members of the Broxbourne Borough Council, the local government authority of the borough of Broxbourne, Hertfordshire, England.

== Composition of expiring seats before election ==
Ward	Party	Incumbent Elected	Incumbent	Standing again?
Broxbourne	Conservative	1999	Peter Robinson	No
Bury Green	Conservative	1999	Hazel Jackson	Yes
Cheshunt Central	Conservative	1999	Ray Hannam	Yes
Cheshunt North	Conservative	1999	Len Merry	Yes
Flamstead End	Conservative	1999	Edna Lazzari	No
Goffs Oak	Conservative	1999	Marie Dowsett	No
Hoddesdon North	Conservative	1999	Robert Groucott	Yes
Hoddesdon Town	Conservative	2002	Brian Perry	Yes (Note: Brian Perry stood in Broxbourne Ward in 2003 after being originally elected to Hoddesdon Town Ward in the May 2002 by-election.)
Rosedale	Conservative	1999	Amanda Hayward	Yes
Rye Park	Conservative	1999	David Hale	Yes
Theobalds	Conservative	1999	Norman Ames	Yes
Waltham Cross	Labour	1999	Alan McCole	Yes
Wormley / Turnford	Conservative	1999	Brian Hill	Yes

== Election results ==
Broxbourne local election result 2003
Party	Seats	Gains	Losses	Net gain/loss	Seats %	Votes %	Votes	+/−
Conservative	11	0	1	-1	84.62	60.81	9,884	
Labour	1	0	0	0	7.69	28.04	4,557	
BNP	1	1	0	+1	7.69	7.32	1,189	
Liberal Democrats	0	0	0	0	0	3.83	623	

== Results summary ==
An election was held in all of the 13 wards on 1 May 2003.

The British National Party gained 1 seat from the Conservative Party in Rosedale Ward

The new political balance of the council following this election was:

- Conservative 34 seats
- Labour 2 seats
- Independent 1 seat
- British National Party 1 seat

== Ward results ==
Broxbourne Ward Result 1 May 2003
Party	Candidate	Votes	%	±%
Conservative	Brian Perry	898	68.24	
Liberal Democrats	Kirstie De Rivaz	227	17.25	
Labour	James Bolden	191	14.51	
Majority		671		
Turnout		1,316		
Conservative hold		Swing		

Bury Green Ward Result 1 May 2003
Party	Candidate	Votes	%	±%
Conservative	Hazel Jackson	748	58.44	
Labour	Alexander McInnes	532	41.56	
Majority		216		
Turnout		1,280		
Conservative hold		Swing		

Cheshunt Central Ward Result 1 May 2003
Party	Candidate	Votes	%	±%
Conservative	Raymond Hannam	815	53.72	
Labour	Richard Greenhill	304	20.04	
BNP	Ian Seeby	242	15.95	
Liberal Democrats	Michael Gould	156	10.29	
Majority		511		
Turnout		1,517		
Conservative hold		Swing		

Cheshunt North Ward Result 1 May 2003
Party	Candidate	Votes	%	±%
Conservative	Leonard Merry	629	42.99	
BNP	John Cope	451	30.83	
Labour	Sylvia Courtnage	383	26.18	
Majority		178		
Turnout		1,463		
Conservative hold		Swing		

Flamstead End Ward Result 1 May 2003
Party	Candidate	Votes	%	±%
Conservative	Suzanne Ball-Greenwood	823	77.13	
Labour	Neil Harvey	244	22.87	
Majority		579		
Turnout		1,067		
Conservative hold		Swing		

Goffs Oak Ward Result 1 May 2003
Party	Candidate	Votes	%	±%
Conservative	Jeremy Pearce	1,184	84.03	
Labour	Malcolm Theobald	225	15.97	
Majority		959		
Turnout		1,409		
Conservative hold		Swing		

Hoddesdon North Ward Result 1 May 2003
Party	Candidate	Votes	%	±%
Conservative	Robert Groucott	911	74.37	
Labour	Arthur Hillyard	314	25.63	
Majority		597		
Turnout		1,225		
Conservative hold		Swing		

Hoddesdon Town Ward Result 1 May 2003
Party	Candidate	Votes	%	±%
Conservative	James Burdett	602	56.42	
Liberal Democrats	Andrew Porrer	240	22.49	
Labour	Hugh Kelly	225	21.09	
Majority		362		
Turnout		1,067		
Conservative hold		Swing		

Rosedale Ward Result 1 May 2003
Party	Candidate	Votes	%	±%
BNP	Ramon Johns	496	48.44	
Conservative	Mandy Hayward	346	33.79	
Labour	Christopher Simonovitch	182	17.77	
Majority		150		
Turnout		1,024		
BNP gain from Conservative		Swing		

Rye Park Ward Result 1 May 2003
Party	Candidate	Votes	%	±%
Conservative	David Hale	714	53.32	
Labour	Annette Marples	625	46.68	
Majority		89		
Turnout		1,339		
Conservative hold		Swing		

Theobalds Ward Result 1 May 2003
Party	Candidate	Votes	%	±%
Conservative	Norman Ames	936	72.11	
Labour	Ronald McCole	362	27.89	
Majority		574		
Turnout		1,298		
Conservative hold		Swing		

Waltham Cross Ward Result 1 May 2003
Party	Candidate	Votes	%	±%
Labour	Alan McCole	617	55.54	
Conservative	Christine Mitchell	494	44.46	
Majority		123		
Turnout		1,111		
Labour hold		Swing		

Wormley / Turnford Ward Result 1 May 2003
Party	Candidate	Votes	%	±%
Conservative	Brian Hill	784	68.95	
Labour	Edward Hopwood	353	31.05	
Majority		431		
Turnout		1,137		
Conservative hold		Swing		
