= Ilford North (electoral division) =

Electoral division in Greater London, 1973–1986

- Former electoral division for the Greater London Council
- Ilford North electoral division boundaries
- District: Redbridge
- Electorate: 64,715 (1973); 64,900 (1977); 66,015 (1981)
- Area: 2,684 hectares (26.84 km^{2})

Former electoral division
- Created: 1973
- Abolished: 1986
- Member: 1
- Created from: Redbridge

Ilford North was an electoral division for the purposes of elections to the Greater London Council. The constituency elected one councillor for a four-year term in 1973, 1977 and 1981, with the final term extended for an extra year ahead of the abolition of the Greater London Council.

== History ==
It was planned to use the same boundaries as the Westminster Parliament constituencies for election of councillors to the Greater London Council (GLC), as had been the practice for elections to the predecessor London County Council, but those that existed in 1965 crossed the Greater London boundary. Until new constituencies could be settled, the 32 London boroughs were used as electoral areas. The London Borough of Redbridge formed the Redbridge electoral division. This was used for the Greater London Council elections in 1964, 1967 and 1970.

The new constituencies were settled following the Second Periodic Review of Westminster constituencies and the new electoral division matched the boundaries of the Ilford North parliamentary constituency.

It covered an area of 2,684 hectares (26.84 km^{2}).

== Elections ==
The Ilford North constituency was used for the Greater London Council elections in 1973, 1977 and 1981. One councillor was elected at each election using first-past-the-post voting.

=== 1973 election ===
The fourth election to the GLC (and first using revised boundaries) was held on 12 April 1973. The electorate was 64,715 and one Labour Party councillor was elected. The turnout was 37.0%. The councillor was elected for a three-year term. This was extended for an extra year in 1976 when the electoral cycle was switched to four-yearly.

1973 Greater London Council election: Ilford North
Party	Candidate	Votes	%	±%
Labour	Timothy J. Ridoutt	9,999	41.76	
Conservative	N. G. Thorne	9,537	39.84	
Liberal	G. L. P. Wilson	4,410	18.41	
Turnout				
Labour win (new seat)				

=== 1977 election ===
The fifth election to the GLC (and second using revised boundaries) was held on 5 May 1977. The electorate was 64,900 and one Conservative Party councillor was elected. The turnout was 50.1%. The councillor was elected for a four-year term.

1977 Greater London Council election: Ilford North
Party	Candidate	Votes	%	±%
Conservative	Marion Audrey Roe	19,465	59.84	
Labour	Timothy J. Ridoutt	9,765	30.02	
Liberal	J. Freeman	1,939	5.96	
National Front	J. P. Clarke	1,362	4.19	
Turnout				
Conservative gain from Labour		Swing		

=== 1981 election ===
The sixth and final election to the GLC (and third using revised boundaries) was held on 7 May 1981. The electorate was 66,015 and one Conservative Party councillor was elected. The turnout was 46.8%. The councillor was elected for a four-year term, extended by an extra year by the Local Government (Interim Provisions) Act 1984, ahead of the abolition of the council.

1981 Greater London Council election: Ilford North
Party	Candidate	Votes	%	±%
Conservative	Marion Audrey Roe	15,022	48.59	
Labour	Michael A. Killingworth	11,857	38.36	
Liberal	Gary P Staight	3,236	10.46	
National Front	Harold Marshall	387	1.25	
Ecology	Neil Jeffries	330	1.07	
NNF	Keith Sims	92	0.30	
Turnout				
Conservative hold		Swing		
