= 2011 Broxbourne Borough Council election =

2011 UK local government election

Results of the 2011 Broxbourne Borough Council election

The 2011 Broxbourne Council election took place on 5 May 2011 to elect members of Broxbourne Borough Council in Hertfordshire, England. One third of the council was up for election.

This was the last election before boundary changes take place in 2012.

Accordingly, all newly elected members will have a 1-year term of office before an "all out" election for 30 members in 10 new wards in May 2012.

== Composition of expiring seats before election ==
Ward	Party	Incumbent elected	Incumbent	Standing again?
Broxbourne	Conservative	2007	Brian Perry	No
Bury Green	Conservative	2007	Hazel Jackson	Yes
Cheshunt Central	Conservative	2007	Ray Hannam	Yes
Cheshunt North	Independent	2007	Joanne Welch	Yes (Note: Joanne Welch elected as a Conservative in 2007.)
Flamstead End	Conservative	2007	Susan Ball-Greenwood	Yes
Goffs Oak	Conservative	2007	Jeremy Pearce	Yes
Hoddesdon North	Conservative	2007	Eddy Rowland	Yes (Note: Eddy Rowland stood in Broxbourne Ward in 2011.)
Hoddesdon Town	Conservative	2007	Brian Hill	Yes
Rosedale	Conservative	2007	Dee Hart	Yes
Rye Park	Conservative	2007	Antonio Infantino	Yes
Theobalds	Conservative	2007	Norman Ames	Yes
Waltham Cross	Labour	2007	Richard Greenhill	Yes (Note: Richard Greenhill stood in Theobalds Ward in 2011.)
Wormley / Turnford	Conservative	2007	Paolo Caruso	No

== Election results ==
Broxbourne local election result 2011
Party	Seats	Gains	Losses	Net gain/loss	Seats %	Votes %	Votes	+/−
Conservative	12	1	0	+1	92.31	63.09	15,834	+3.40
Labour	1	0	0	0	7.69	26.15	6,563	+5.06
English Democrat	0	0	0	0	0	4.73	1,188	+4.73
UKIP	0	0	0	0	0	2.38	596	+2.38
Independent	0	0	1	-1	0	1.93	484	+1.93
Liberal Democrats	0	0	0	0	0	1.72	432	-9.54
BNP	0	0	0	0	0	0.00	0	-7.96

== Results summary ==
An election was held in all 13 wards on Thursday 5 May 2011 with the Conservative Party winning 12 of the 13 seats, making a gain in Cheshunt North Ward from an Independent.

This was the first Broxbourne Council Election where the English Democrats and United Kingdom Independence Party had fielded candidates. All four of the English Democrat candidates at this election had previously stood for the British National Party in the 2010 Broxbourne Borough Election. This was the first Broxbourne Borough Election since 2000 where the British National Party had failed to field any candidates.

The new political balance of the council following this election was:

- Conservative 35 seats
- Labour 3 seats

This was the final Broxbourne Council Election before boundary changes take place in 2012. The boundary changes will reduce the number of wards from 13 to 10 and the number of Borough Councillors from 38 to 30. The next Local Government Election is scheduled for Thursday 3 May 2012 when all 30 of the new seats will be contested

Shortly after the May 2011 election, Councillor Jason Brimson (elected May 2010) resigned from his Cheshunt Central Seat. At the subsequent by-election held on 30 June 2011, Councillor Tony Siracusa (Conservative) was elected leaving the political balance of the council unchanged.

In November 2011 Councillor Keith Bellamy (Rye Park Ward) was suspended by the Conservative Party.

As a result of this, the political balance of the Council changed to:

- Conservative 34 seats
- Labour 3 seats
- Unaligned 1 seat

== Broxbourne Council Cabinet 2011 – 2012 ==
Coinciding with this election was a move to a Leader & Cabinet system from the previously operated Committee system (Alternative Sec 31)

Name	Portfolio	Ward
Paul Mason	Leader of the Council	Broxbourne
David Lewis	Finance & Personnel (Deputy Leader of the Council)	Rosedale
Hazel Jackson	Direct Services	Bury Green
Jim Metcalf	Housing & Regeneration	Wormley & Turnford
Paul Seeby	Community	Flamstead End
Martin Kennaugh	Cabinet Secretary	Bury Green

== Ward results ==
Broxbourne Ward Result 5 May 2011
Party	Candidate	Votes	%	±%
Conservative	Eddy Rowland	1,601	72.51	
Labour	Ray Cook	338	15.31	
Liberal Democrats	Kirstie De Rivaz	269	12.18	
Majority		1,263		
Turnout		2,208	43.95	
Conservative hold		Swing		

Bury Green Ward Result 5 May 2011
Party	Candidate	Votes	%	±%
Conservative	Hazel Jackson	1,035	60.31	
Labour	Ed Hopwood	389	22.67	
English Democrat	Chris Francis	292	17.02	
Majority		646		
Turnout		1,716	35.88	
Conservative hold		Swing		

Cheshunt Central Ward Result 5 May 2011
Party	Candidate	Votes	%	±%
Conservative	Ray Hannam	1,405	67.91	
Labour	Ron McCole	423	20.44	
English Democrat	Ramon Johns	241	11.65	
Majority		982		
Turnout		2,069	36.81	
Conservative hold		Swing		

Cheshunt North Ward Result 5 May 2011
Party	Candidate	Votes	%	±%
Conservative	Nick Hart	1,175	62.63	
Labour	Peter Alford	495	26.39	
Independent	Joanne Welch	206	10.98	
Majority		680		
Turnout		1,876	33.76	
Conservative gain from Independent		Swing		

Flamstead End Ward Result 5 May 2011
Party	Candidate	Votes	%	±%
Conservative	Sue Ball-Greenwood	1,412	76.24	
Labour	Bernice Paulin-Booth	440	23.76	
Majority		972		
Turnout		1,852	35.58	
Conservative hold		Swing		

Goffs Oak Ward Result 5 May 2011
Party	Candidate	Votes	%	±%
Conservative	Jeremy Pearce	1,904	81.19	
Labour	Cherry Robbins	441	18.81	
Majority		1,463		
Turnout		2,345	37.65	
Conservative hold		Swing		

Hoddesdon North Ward Result 5 May 2011
Party	Candidate	Votes	%	±%
Conservative	Justin Evans	1,446	66.24	
Labour	Paul Hillyard	435	19.93	
UKIP	Albert Nicholas	302	13.83	
Majority		1,011		
Turnout		2,183	39.70	
Conservative hold		Swing		

Hoddesdon Town Ward Result 5 May 2011
Party	Candidate	Votes	%	±%
Conservative	Brian Hill	1,067	55.93	
Labour	Alex Harvey	400	20.96	
Independent	Lyndsey Leeden	278	14.57	
Liberal Democrats	Peter Huse	163	8.54	
Majority		667		
Turnout		1,908	34.44	
Conservative hold		Swing		

Rosedale Ward Result 5 May 2011
Party	Candidate	Votes	%	±%
Conservative	Dee Hart	642	53.95	
English Democrat	Steve McCole	334	28.07	
Labour	George Panayiotopoulos	214	17.98	
Majority		308		
Turnout		1,190	35.50	
Conservative hold		Swing		

Rye Park Ward Result 5 May 2011
Party	Candidate	Votes	%	±%
Conservative	Tony Infantino	945	51.93	
Labour	Annette Marples	581	31.92	
UKIP	David Platt	294	16.15	
Majority		364		
Turnout		1,820	34.90	
Conservative hold		Swing		

Theobalds Ward Result 5 May 2011
Party	Candidate	Votes	%	±%
Conservative	Norman Ames	1,293	61.22	
Labour	Richard Greenhill	819	38.78	
Majority		474		
Turnout		2,112	38.20	
Conservative hold		Swing		

Waltham Cross Ward Result 5 May 2011
Party	Candidate	Votes	%	±%
Labour	Neil Harvey	1,045	61.33	
Conservative	Tony Siracusa	659	38.67	
Majority		386		
Turnout		1,704	33.13	
Labour hold		Swing		

Wormley & Turnford Ward Result 5 May 2011
Party	Candidate	Votes	%	±%
Conservative	Anna Pilikos	1,250	59.13	
Labour	Tom Stone	543	25.69	
English Democrat	William Dewick	321	15.18	
Majority		707		
Turnout		2,114	30.93	
Conservative hold		Swing		
