= Robert Mitchell (water polo) =

British water polo player (1913–1996)

Personal information
- Born: 14 December 1913 Plaistow, Newham, England
- Died: 12 November 1996 (aged 82)

Sport
- Sport: Water polo

Robert Mitchell (14 December 1913 – 12 November 1996), known as Bobby Mitchell, was a British water polo player who competed in the 1936 Summer Olympics.

== Life ==
Mitchell was born in east London, and was educated at West Ham Secondary School and St John's College, Cambridge, where he read natural sciences. He was a three-time Cambridge swimming and water polo Blue between 1933 and 1935; in his three appearances against Oxford in the Varsity matches, he was on the winning water polo team each time. An England international, he represented the British Universities team in the 1500 metres at the International University Games at Budapest in 1935. He was also a member of Plaistow United Swimming Club, which won the English County Championship every year from 1933 to 1939.

Mitchell was part of the British water polo team that finished eighth in the 1936 Summer Olympics, which included several other members of Plaistow United SC. He played all seven matches. Twelve years later, at the 1948 Summer Olympics, he was a reserve player and did not participate in a match during the tournament.

He was later a Conservative member of the Greater London Council for Redbridge (1964–73) and then Wanstead and Woodford (1973–86). He stood as the Conservative candidate in two general elections, 1964 and 1966, in West Ham South, but lost both times.

Civic offices
Preceded by Peter Black	Chairman of the Greater London Council; 1971–1972	Succeeded by Frank Abbott
