= 1979 Broxbourne Borough Council election =

1979 UK local government election

The 1979 Broxbourne Council election was held to elect council members of the Broxbourne Borough Council - the local government authority of the borough of Broxbourne, Hertfordshire, England.

== Composition of expiring seats before election ==
Ward	Party	Incumbent Elected	Incumbent	Standing again?
Broxbourne	Conservative	1976	J E Ball	Yes
Bury Green	Conservative	1976	M Franklin	Yes
Cheshunt Central	Conservative	1976	L C Parker	Yes
Cheshunt North	Conservative	1976	D Moody	Yes
Flamstead End	Conservative	1976	J G E Swannell	Yes
Goffs Oak	Conservative	1976	J M Sanderson	Yes
Hoddesdon North	Conservative	1976	G C B Walker	Yes
Hoddesdon Town	Conservative	1976	K A Sandison	No
Rosedale	Conservative	1976	R J Donoghue	No
Rye Park	Labour	1976	J H Davis	Yes
Theobalds	Conservative	1976	G F Ebeling	Yes
Waltham Cross North	Conservative	1976	D Forbes-Buckingham	Yes
Waltham Cross South	Labour	1976	M Oliver	No
Wormley & Turnford	Conservative	1976	O G Alderman	Yes

== Election results ==
Broxbourne local election result 1979
Party	Seats	Gains	Losses	Net gain/loss	Seats %	Votes %	Votes	+/−
Conservative	12	0	0	0	85.71	58.44	24,568	
Labour	2	0	0	0	14.29	34.29	14,413	
Liberal	0	0	0	0	0.00	5.29	2,224	
National Front	0	0	0	0	0.00	1.98	833	

== Results summary ==
An election was held in 14 wards on 3 May 1979.

No seats changes hands at this election

The political balance of the council following this election was:

- Conservative 37 seats
- Labour 5 seats

== Ward results ==
Broxbourne Ward Result 3 May 1979
Party	Candidate	Votes	%	±%
Conservative	Joyce Ball	2,945	75.44	
Labour	Julian Batsleer	829	21.23	
National Front	Eric Hare	130	3.33	
Majority		2,116		
Turnout		3,904	80.4	
Conservative hold		Swing		

Bury Green Ward Result 3 May 1979
Party	Candidate	Votes	%	±%
Conservative	Mark Franklin	1,686	47.75	
Labour	Chris Robbins	1,678	47.52	
National Front	Timothy Dyer	167	4.73	
Majority		8		
Turnout		3,531	74.20	
Conservative hold		Swing		

Cheshunt Central Ward Result 3 May 1979
Party	Candidate	Votes	%	±%
Conservative	Leslie Parker	1,948	67.99	
Labour	Leslie Goodrum	917	32.01	
Majority		1,031		
Turnout		2,865	80.30	
Conservative hold		Swing		

Cheshunt North Ward Result 3 May 1979
Party	Candidate	Votes	%	±%
Conservative	Doris Moody	1,794	51.41	
Labour	Deirdre Welsh	1,075	30.80	
Liberal	Laurence Talbot	467	13.38	
National Front	Paul Heard	154	4.41	
Majority		719		
Turnout		3,490	76.80	
Conservative hold		Swing		

Flamstead End Ward Result 3 May 1979
Party	Candidate	Votes	%	±%
Conservative	James Swannell	2,169	64.94	
Labour	Michael Crane	1,015	30.39	
National Front	Frederick Venables	156	4.67	
Majority		1,154		
Turnout		3,340	80.80	
Conservative hold		Swing		

Goffs Oak Ward Result 3 May 1979
Party	Candidate	Votes	%	±%
Conservative	Ken Sanderson	1,974	78.40	
Labour	Pat Whittheard	544	21.60	
Majority		1,430		
Turnout		2,518	81.10	
Conservative hold		Swing		

Hoddesdon North Ward Result 3 May 1979
Party	Candidate	Votes	%	±%
Conservative	Gerald Walker	2,258	59.45	
Labour	Tony Pusey	841	22.14	
Liberal	Pam Armfield	699	18.41	
Majority		1,559		
Turnout		3,798	83.80	
Conservative hold		Swing		

Hoddesdon Town Ward Result 3 May 1979
Party	Candidate	Votes	%	±%
Conservative	Jack Scott	2,235	66.03	
Labour	Jack Warner	1,150	33.97	
Majority		1,085		
Turnout		3,385	76.10	
Conservative hold		Swing		

Rosedale Ward Result 3 May 1979
Party	Candidate	Votes	%	±%
Conservative	Tom Wright	624	50.32	
Labour	Jack Lucas	556	44.84	
National Front	Ramon Johns	60	4.84	
Majority		68		
Turnout		1,240	78.20	
Conservative hold		Swing		

Rye Park Ward Result 3 May 1979
Party	Candidate	Votes	%	±%
Labour	John Davis	1,479	44.52	
Conservative	Nigel Cayne	1,328	39.98	
Liberal	Julian Gould	515	15.50	
Majority		151		
Turnout		3,322	77.10	
Labour hold		Swing		

Theobalds Ward Result 3 May 1979
Party	Candidate	Votes	%	±%
Conservative	George Ebeling	1,991	64.90	
Labour	Joan Saggs	1,077	35.10	
Majority		914		
Turnout		3,068	76.60	
Conservative hold		Swing		

Waltham Cross North Ward Result 3 May 1979
Party	Candidate	Votes	%	±%
Conservative	Derek Forbes-Buckingham	1,282	54.81	
Labour	Ernie Carter	1,057	45.19	
Majority		225		
Turnout		2,339	74.60	
Conservative hold		Swing		

Waltham Cross South Ward Result 3 May 1979
Party	Candidate	Votes	%	±%
Labour	Daisy Cunningham	1,554	53.48	
Conservative	Amy Testro	1,186	40.81	
National Front	Roger Bailey	166	5.71	
Majority		368		
Turnout		2,906	71.10	
Labour hold		Swing		

Wormley / Turnford Ward Result 3 May 1979
Party	Candidate	Votes	%	±%
Conservative	Oliver Alderman	1,148	49.23	
Labour	Jim Emslie	641	27.49	
Liberal	Barbara Wade	543	23.28	
Majority		507		
Turnout		2,332	72.80	
Conservative hold		Swing		
