= 2006 Broxbourne Borough Council election =

2006 UK local government election

Results of the 2006 Broxbourne Borough Council election

The Broxbourne Council election, 2006 was held to elect council members of the Broxbourne Borough Council, the local government authority of the borough of Broxbourne, Hertfordshire, England.

== Composition of expiring seats before election ==
Ward	Party	Incumbent Elected	Incumbent	Standing again?
Broxbourne	Conservative	2002	Joyce Ball	Yes
Bury Green	Independent	2002	Martin Greensmyth	Yes (Note: Martin Greensmyth stood as a Conservative in 2006.)
Cheshunt Central	Conservative	2002	Keith Brown	Yes
Cheshunt North	Conservative	2002	Kay Leese	Yes
Flamstead End	Conservative	2002	Paul Seeby	Yes
Goffs Oak	Conservative	2002	Elizabeth Clayton	No
Hoddesdon North	Conservative	2002	Alan Smith	Yes
Hoddesdon Town	Conservative	2002	Kenneth Ayling	Yes
Rosedale	Conservative	2005	David Lewis	Yes (Note: David Lewis elected at Rosedale by-election in 2005.)
Rye Park	Conservative	2002	Moyra O'Neill	Yes
Theobalds	Conservative	2002	Carol Crump	Yes
Waltham Cross	Labour	2002	Malcolm Aitken	Yes
Wormley / Turnford	Conservative	2007	Gordon Nicholson	Yes

== Election results ==
Broxbourne local election result 2006
Party	Seats	Gains	Losses	Net gain/loss	Seats %	Votes %	Votes	+/−
Conservative	12	1	0	+1	92.31	68.85	14,746	+2.62
Labour	1	0	0	0	7.69	22.16	4,746	-2.18
BNP	0	0	0	0	0.00	5.13	1,098	+0.28
Liberal Democrats	0	0	0	0	0.00	2.49	533	-2.09
New Party	0	0	0	0	0.00	1.37	293	+1.37

== Results summary ==
An election was held in all 13 wards on 4 May 2006.

The Conservative Party gained a seat in Bury Green Ward from the independent "Bury Green Residents".

Martin Greensmyth who had won the seat for the "Bury Green Residents" in the 2002 Local Government Election stood for the Conservative Party in 2006 and retained his seat as a Conservative.

The new political balance of the council following this election was:

- Conservative 35 seats
- Labour 2 seats
- British National Party 1 seat

The next Local Government Election was held on 1 May 2007 when seats were contested in all of the 13 wards.

== Ward results ==
Broxbourne Ward Result 4 May 2006
Party	Candidate	Votes	%	±%
Conservative	Joyce Ball	1,357	74.76	+6.04
Liberal Democrats	Kirstie De Rivaz	302	16.64	−3.08
Labour	Marios Kousoulou	156	8.60	−2.96
Majority		1,055		
Turnout		1,815	36.80	
Conservative hold		Swing		

Bury Green Ward Result 4 May 2006
Party	Candidate	Votes	%	±%
Conservative	Martin Greensmyth	913	56.95	−5.22
Labour	Alexander McInnes	397	24.77	−13.06
New Party	Paul Fairchild	293	18.28	+18.28
Majority		516		
Turnout		1,603	40.00	
Conservative gain from Independent		Swing		

Cheshunt Central Ward Result 4 May 2006
Party	Candidate	Votes	%	±%
Conservative	Keith Brown	1,147	58.20	+5.89
BNP	Ian Seeby	520	26.38	+6.39
Labour	Christopher Simonovitch	304	15.42	−0.57
Majority		627		
Turnout		1,971	37.40	
Conservative hold		Swing		

Cheshunt North Ward Result 4 May 2006
Party	Candidate	Votes	%	±%
Conservative	Kay Leese	1,150	74.05	+25.87
Labour	James Meadows	403	25.95	+4.08
Majority		747		
Turnout		1,553	29.80	
Conservative hold		Swing		

Flamstead End Ward Result 4 May 2006
Party	Candidate	Votes	%	±%
Conservative	Paul Seeby	1,212	73.37	−3.31
Labour	Shirley McInnes	440	26.63	+3.31
Majority		772		
Turnout		1,652	34.10	
Conservative hold		Swing		

Goffs Oak Ward Result 4 May 2006
Party	Candidate	Votes	%	±%
Conservative	Mark Mills-Bishop	1,716	87.51	+3.90
Labour	Cherry Robbins	245	12.49	−3.90
Majority		1,471		
Turnout		1,961	33.50	
Conservative hold		Swing		

Hoddesdon North Ward Result 4 May 2006
Party	Candidate	Votes	%	±%
Conservative	Alan Smith	1,410	83.19	+2.51
Labour	Patricia Bolden	285	16.81	−2.51
Majority		1,125		
Turnout		1,695	32.90	
Conservative hold		Swing		

Hoddesdon Town Ward Result 4 May 2006
Party	Candidate	Votes	%	±%
Conservative	Kenneth Ayling	959	67.30	+6.46
Labour	Neil Harvey	235	16.49	−0.29
Liberal Democrats	Andrew Porrer	231	16.21	−6.17
Majority		724		
Turnout		1,425	29.10	
Conservative hold		Swing		

Rosedale Ward Result 4 May 2006
Party	Candidate	Votes	%	±%
Conservative	David Lewis	628	45.24	+3.74
BNP	Stephen McCole	578	41.64	+15.34
Labour	Richard Greenhill	182	13.11	−8.99
Majority		50		
Turnout		1,388	42.90	
Conservative hold		Swing		

Rye Park Ward Result 4 May 2006
Party	Candidate	Votes	%	±%
Conservative	Moyra O'Neill	1003	64.71	+5.95
Labour	Annette Marples	547	35.29	−5.95
Majority		456		
Turnout		1,550	30.70	
Conservative hold		Swing		

Theobalds Ward Result 4 May 2006
Party	Candidate	Votes	%	±%
Conservative	Carol Crump	1,337	77.60	+1.44
Labour	Ronald McCole	386	22.40	−1.44
Majority		951		
Turnout		1,723	33.90	
Conservative hold		Swing		

Waltham Cross Ward Result 4 May 2006
Party	Candidate	Votes	%	±%
Labour	Malcolm Aitkin	756	53.62	+6.15
Conservative	Jill Thatcher	654	44.14	−6.15
Majority		102		
Turnout		1,410	29.30	
Labour hold		Swing		

Wormley / Turnford Ward Result 4 May 2006
Party	Candidate	Votes	%	±%
Conservative	Gordon Nicholson	1,260	75.45	+3.02
Labour	Ian Hunter	410	24.55	−3.02
Majority		850		
Turnout		1,670	27.30	
Conservative hold		Swing		
