= 2007 Broxbourne Borough Council election =

2007 UK local government election

Results of the 2007 Broxbourne Borough Council election

The Broxbourne Council election, 2007 was held on 3 May 2007 to elect council members of the Broxbourne Borough Council, a local government authority in Hertfordshire, England.

== Composition of expiring seats before election ==
Ward	Party	Incumbent Elected	Incumbent	Standing again?
Broxbourne	Conservative	2003	Brian Perry	Yes
Bury Green	Conservative	2003	Hazel Jackson	Yes
Cheshunt Central	Conservative	2003	Ray Hannam	Yes
Cheshunt North	Conservative	2003	Len Merry	No
Flamstead End	Conservative	2003	Suzanne Ball-Greenwood	Yes
Goffs Oak	Conservative	2003	Jeremy Pearce	Yes
Hoddesdon North	Conservative	2003	Robert Groucott	No
Hoddesdon Town	Conservative	2003	James Burdett	No
Rosedale	British National Party	2003	Ramon Johns	Yes
Rye Park	Conservative	2003	David Hale	No
Theobalds	Conservative	2003	Norman Ames	Yes
Waltham Cross	Labour	2003	Alan McCole	No
Wormley / Turnford	Conservative	2003	Brian Hill	Yes (Note: Brian Hill stood in Hoddesdon Town Ward in 2007.)

== Election results ==
Broxbourne local election result 2007
Party	Seats	Gains	Losses	Net gain/loss	Seats %	Votes %	Votes	+/−
Conservative	12	1	0	+1	92.31	63.98	13,281	-4.86
Labour	1	0	0	0	7.69	18.96	3,932	-3.21
BNP	0	0	1	-1	0.00	13.34	2,768	+8.21
Liberal Democrats	0	0	0	0	0.00	2.83	587	+0.34
New Party	0	0	0	0	0.00	0.45	94	-0.92
National Front	0	0	0	0	0.00	0.44	91	+0.44

== Results summary ==
An election was held in all 13 wards on 3 May 2007.

The Conservative Party gained 1 seat from the British National Party in the Rosedale Ward – this seat was previously lost to the British National Party in the 2003 Local Government Election.

The new make up of the council following this election was:

- Conservative 36 seats
- Labour 2 seats

The next Local Government Election was held on 1 May 2008 when seats were contested in 12 of the 13 wards. (No election in Rosedale Ward)

== Ward results ==
Broxbourne Ward Result 3 May 2007
Party	Candidate	Votes	%	±%
Conservative	Brian Perry	1,355	77.78	+3.02
Liberal Democrats	Andrew Porrer	223	12.80	−3.84
Labour	Marios Kousoulou	164	9.41	+0.82
Majority		1,132		
Turnout		1,742	35.30	
Conservative hold		Swing		

Bury Green Ward Result 3 May 2007
Party	Candidate	Votes	%	±%
Conservative	Hazel Jackson	853	47.52	−9.43
BNP	Stephen McCole	571	31.81	+31.81
Labour	Alexander McInnes	277	15.43	−9.33
New Party	Paul Fairchild	94	5.24	−13.04
Majority		282		
Turnout		1,795	38.71	
Conservative hold		Swing		

Cheshunt Central Ward Result 3 May 2007
Party	Candidate	Votes	%	±%
Conservative	Raymond Hannam	1,141	64.72	+6.53
BNP	Ian Seeby	337	19.12	−7.27
Labour	Christopher Simonovitch	285	16.17	+0.74
Majority		804		
Turnout		1,763	32.75	
Conservative hold		Swing		

Cheshunt North Ward Result 3 May 2007
Party	Candidate	Votes	%	±%
Conservative	Joanne Welch	913	58.23	−15.82
Labour	Peter Alford	302	19.26	−6.69
BNP	Wendy Ward	262	16.71	+16.71
National Front	John Cope	91	5.80	+5.80
Majority		611		
Turnout		1,568	29.49	
Conservative hold		Swing		

Flamstead End Ward Result 3 May 2007
Party	Candidate	Votes	%	±%
Conservative	Suzanne Ball-Greenwood	960	65.08	−8.28
BNP	Mark Gerrard	295	20.00	+20.00
Labour	Shirley McInnes	220	14.92	−11.72
Majority		665		
Turnout		1,475	29.35	
Conservative hold		Swing		

Goffs Oak Ward Result 3 May 2007
Party	Candidate	Votes	%	±%
Conservative	Jeremy Pearce	1,562	88.30	+0.86
Labour	Cherry Robbins	207	11.70	−0.86
Majority		1,355		
Turnout		1,769	29.14	
Conservative hold		Swing		

Hoddesdon North Ward Result 3 May 2007
Party	Candidate	Votes	%	±%
Conservative	Edward Rowland	1,193	71.78	−11.40
Labour	Edward Hopwood	256	15.40	−1.41
BNP	Colin Whittaker	213	12.82	+12.82
Majority		937		
Turnout		1,662	31.20	
Conservative hold		Swing		

Hoddesdon Town Ward Result 3 May 2007
Party	Candidate	Votes	%	±%
Conservative	Brian Hill	930	65.82	−1.48
Liberal Democrats	Kirstie De Rivaz	259	18.33	+2.12
Labour	Neil Harvey	224	15.85	−0.64
Majority		671		
Turnout		1,413	28.29	
Conservative hold		Swing		

Rosedale Ward Result 3 May 2007
Party	Candidate	Votes	%	±%
Conservative	Delores Hart	744	60.83	+15.59
BNP	Ramon Johns	343	28.05	−13.60
Labour	Michael Watson	136	11.12	−1.99
Majority		401		
Turnout		1,223	36.51	
Conservative gain from BNP		Swing		

Rye Park Ward Result 3 May 2007
Party	Candidate	Votes	%	±%
Conservative	Antonio Infantino	873	54.46	−10.25
Labour	Annette Marples	439	27.39	−7.90
BNP	Michael Fells	186	11.60	+11.60
Liberal Democrats	Michael Winrow	105	6.55	+6.55
Majority		434		
Turnout		1,603	31.88	
Conservative hold		Swing		

Theobalds Ward Result 3 May 2007
Party	Candidate	Votes	%	±%
Conservative	Norman Ames	1,031	62.71	−14.88
Labour	Ronald McCole	357	21.72	−0.69
BNP	David Martin	256	15.57	+15.57
Majority		674		
Turnout		1,644	30.91	
Conservative hold		Swing		

Waltham Cross Ward Result 3 May 2007
Party	Candidate	Votes	%	±%
Labour	Richard Greenhill	820	55.86	+2.24
Conservative	Jill Thatcher	648	44.14	−2.24
Majority		172		
Turnout		1,468	30.15	
Labour hold		Swing		

Wormley / Turnford Ward Result 3 May 2007
Party	Candidate	Votes	%	±%
Conservative	Paolo Caruso	1,068	66.01	−9.44
BNP	David McQueen	305	18.85	+18.85
Labour	Ian Hunter	245	15.14	−9.41
Majority		763		
Turnout		1,618	25.32	
Conservative hold		Swing		
