= 2018 Broxbourne Borough Council election =

Broxbourne Borough Council election

The 2018 Broxbourne Borough Council election took place on 3 May 2018 to elect members of the Broxbourne Borough Council in England. This was on the same day as other local elections. The Conservatives retained control of the council.

== Results summary ==
2019 Broxbourne Borough Council election
Party	This election			Full council			This election		
Party	Seats	Net	Seats %	Other	Total	Total %	Votes	Votes %	+/−
Conservative	9	▲1	90.0	18	27	90.0	11,726	59.5	+4.9
Labour	1	Steady	10.0	2	3	10.0	5,611	28.5	+2.0
Liberal Democrats	0	Steady	0.0	0	0	0.0	1,749	8.9	N/A
UKIP	0	▼1	0.0	0	0	0.0	451	2.3	-15.9
Green	0	Steady	0.0	0	0	0.0	143	0.7	±0.0
Duma Polska	0	Steady	0.0	0	0	0.0	22	0.1	N/A

== Ward results ==
=== Broxbourne & Hoddesdon South ===
Broxbourne & Hoddesdon South
Party	Candidate	Votes	%	±%
Conservative	Jim Metcalf	1,736	72.5	+9.7
Labour	Kathy Condon	322	13.5	−1.1
Liberal Democrats	Kirstie de Rivaz	192	8.0	N/A
Green	Sally Kemp	143	6.0	−0.1
Majority				
Turnout			32.70	
Conservative hold		Swing		

=== Cheshunt North ===
Cheshunt North
Party	Candidate	Votes	%	±%
Conservative	Mike Iszatt	1,099	59.2	−8.1
Labour	Tony Renwick	597	32.1	−0.6
Liberal Democrats	Kostas Inchenko	161	8.7	N/A
Majority				
Turnout			27.65	
Conservative hold		Swing		

=== Cheshunt South & Theobalds ===
Cheshunt South & Theobalds
Party	Candidate	Votes	%	±%
Conservative	Siobhan Monaghan	1,160	59.4	+9.6
Labour	Steve Basing	634	32.5	+4.3
Liberal Democrats	Deb Highfield	158	8.1	N/A
Majority				
Turnout			28.52	
Conservative hold		Swing		

=== Flamstead End ===
Flamstead End
Party	Candidate	Votes	%	±%
Conservative	Giles Amponsah Hall	1,214	69.4	+11.3
Labour	Ian Dust	430	24.6	+6.2
Liberal Democrats	Kypros Savopoulos	83	4.7	N/A
Duma Polska	Greg Oleszczuk	22	1.3	N/A
Majority				
Turnout			25.46	
Conservative hold		Swing		

=== Goffs Oak ===
Goffs Oak
Party	Candidate	Votes	%	±%
Conservative	Mark Mills-Bishop	1,261	63.7	−2.2
Liberal Democrats	David Payne	360	18.2	N/A
Labour	Sean Waters	260	13.1	−0.1
UKIP	Steve Coster	99	5.0	−15.9
Majority				
Turnout			27.46	
Conservative hold		Swing		

=== Hoddesdon North ===
Hoddesdon North
Party	Candidate	Votes	%	±%
Conservative	Lyn White	1,320	63.4	+7.1
Labour	Janet Wareham	427	20.5	+1.7
UKIP	Mavis Clark	174	8.4	−16.5
Liberal Democrats	Ruth Everness	160	7.7	N/A
Majority				
Turnout			27.74	
Conservative hold		Swing		

=== Hoddesdon Town & Rye Park ===
Hoddesdon Town & Rye Park
Party	Candidate	Votes	%	±%
Conservative	Andreas Payne	918	52.7	+7.2
Labour	Mario Angeli	534	30.7	+3.3
UKIP	Tony Faulkner	178	10.2	−16.9
Liberal Democrats	Luca Perotti	111	6.4	N/A
Majority				
Turnout			24.71	
Conservative gain from UKIP		Swing		

=== Rosedale & Bury Green ===
Rosedale & Bury Green
Party	Candidate	Votes	%	±%
Conservative	Yvonne Mobbs	1,059	63.7	+18.4
Labour	Selina Norgrove	604	36.3	+8.7
Majority				
Turnout			24.67	
Conservative hold		Swing		

=== Waltham Cross ===
Waltham Cross
Party	Candidate	Votes	%	±%
Labour	Carol Bowman	1,231	53.6	−1.9
Conservative	David Brace	732	31.9	−12.6
Liberal Democrats	Fabio Bonfante	333	14.5	N/A
Majority				
Turnout			29.44	
Labour hold		Swing		

=== Wormley & Turnford ===
Wormley & Turnford
Party	Candidate	Votes	%	±%
Conservative	David Taylor	1,226	62.3	+12.3
Labour	Christian Durugo	572	29.1	+2.3
Liberal Democrats	Lisa Naylor	171	8.7	N/A
Majority				
Turnout			24.26	
Conservative hold		Swing		
