= Lewis Cocking =

British politician

Lewis Cocking MP
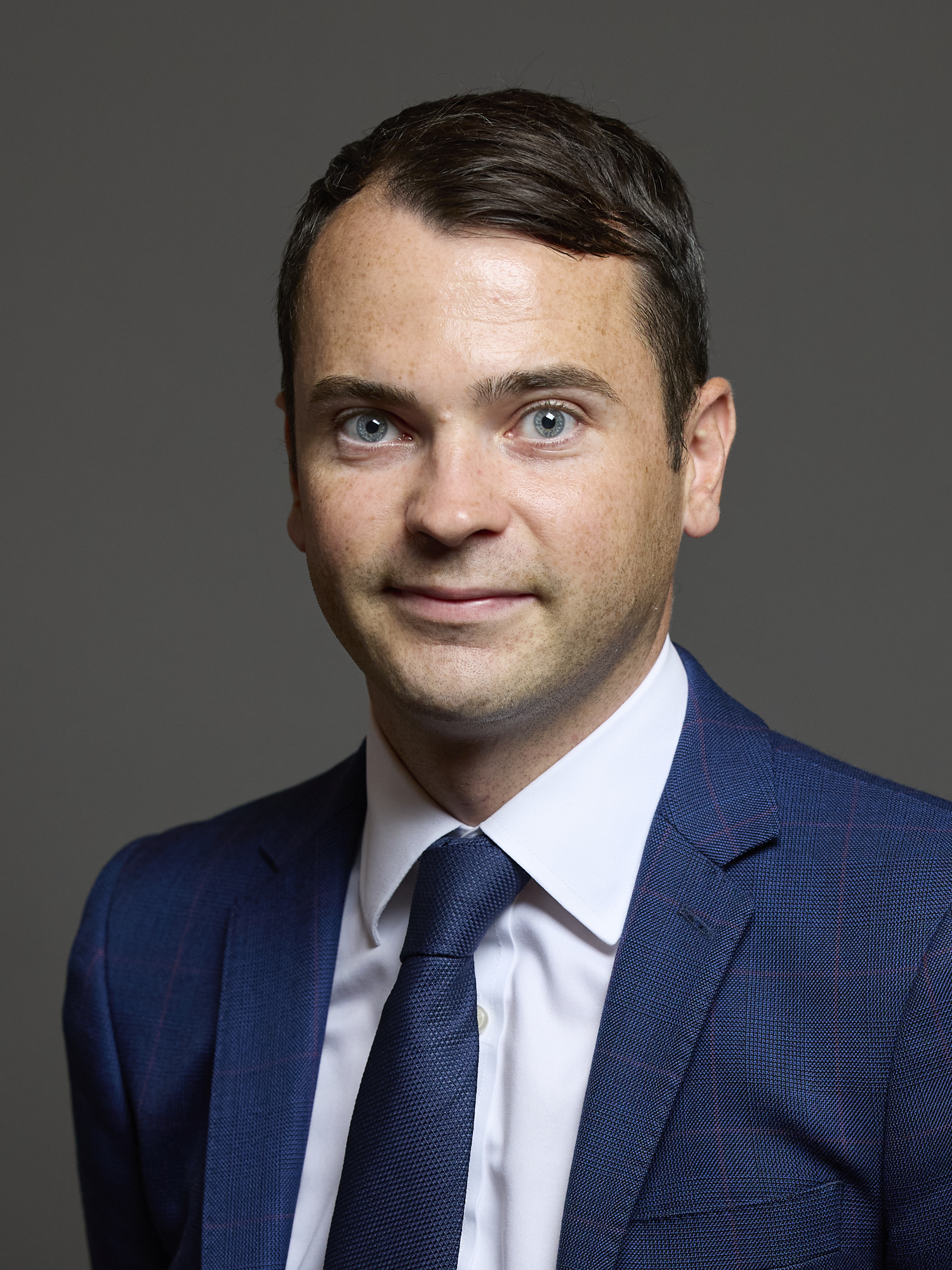
- Official portrait, 2024

Member of Parliament for Broxbourne
- Incumbent
- Assumed office 4 July 2024
- Preceded by: Charles Walker
- Majority: 2,858 (6.6%)

Personal details
- Born: 1992 (age 33–34)
- Party: Conservative
- Education: The John Warner School; University of Portsmouth

Lewis Christopher Cocking (born 1992) is a British Conservative Party politician who has been the Member of Parliament for Broxbourne since the 2024 general election. He was the leader of the Borough of Broxbourne Council from 2019 to 2024.

== Early life ==
Cocking was raised in Hoddesdon, studying at The John Warner School. He graduated from the University of Portsmouth with a degree in geography.

== Political career ==
Cocking was deputy police and crime commissioner for Hertfordshire from 2021 to 2024. Before this, he was a policy, communications and funding manager for Engie.

Cocking was first elected to Broxbourne Council in May 2016, representing Wormley and Turnford ward. He became leader of the Council in May 2019, and a Hertfordshire County Councillor for Hoddesdon North in 2021. Cocking was also a governor for Wormley Primary School, which he attended as a child.

=== House of Commons ===
At the 2024 general election, Cocking was elected Member of Parliament (MP) for Broxbourne, with 15,810 (36.8%) votes and a majority of 2,858 over the second place Labour candidate. On 19 July 2024, he made his maiden speech in the House of Commons during a debate on Planning, the Green Belt and Rural Affairs.

== Electoral history ==
General election 2024: Broxbourne
Party	Candidate	Votes	%	±%
Conservative	Lewis Cocking	15,810	36.8	−27.4
Labour	Catherine Deakin	12,952	30.2	+6.2
Reform	Tom Holdsworth	8,782	20.4	+20.4
Liberal Democrats	Nick Belfitt	2,688	6.3	−2.7
Green	Owen Brett	2,461	5.7	+2.9
UKIP	Martin Harvey	172	0.4	+0.4
English Constitution	Brett Frewin	87	0.2	+0.2
Majority		2,858	6.6	−35.8
Turnout		42,952	57.3	−6.10
Conservative hold		Swing		

Hoddesdon North (Hertfordshire County Council - 2021)
Party	Candidate	Votes	%	±%
Conservative	Lewis Cocking	2,324	68.6	▲8.7
Labour	George Williams	718	21.2	▲5.3
Liberal Democrats	Julia Davies	348	10.3	▲3.7
Majority		1,606	47.4	▲3.4
Turnout		3,390	28.1	▲0.2
Conservative hold		Swing	▲1.7	

Wormley and Turnford (Broxbourne Borough Council - 2021)
Party	Candidate	Votes	%	±%
Conservative	Lewis Cocking	1,366	65.0	+5.0
Labour	Beverley Madeline Susan Hanshaw	530	25.2	+0.6
Liberal Democrats	Lisa Ann Naylor	205	9.8	−5.6
Majority		836	39.80	
Turnout		2,101	26.33	
Conservative hold		Swing		

Wormley and Turnford (Broxbourne Borough Council - 2016)
Party	Candidate	Votes	%	±%
Conservative	Lewis Cocking	969	53.04	
UKIP	Dawn Bloor	450	24.63	
Labour	Kehinde Osifuwa	408	22.33	
Majority		519	28.41	
Turnout		1,827	23.23	
Conservative hold		Swing		

Parliament of the United Kingdom
Preceded by Charles Walker	Member of Parliament for Broxbourne; 2024–present	Incumbent
