= The John Warner School =

Location
- Stanstead Road; Hoddesdon, Hertfordshire, EN11 0QF; England; 51°46′30″N 0°00′01″W

Information
- Type: Academy
- Department for Education URN: 136607 Tables
- Ofsted: Reports
- Acting Headteacher: David A. Allman
- Gender: Coeducational
- Age: 11 to 19
- Enrolment: 1233
- Website: http://www.johnwarner.herts.sch.uk/

The John Warner School is a secondary school with academy status for 11- to 18-year-olds in Hoddesdon, Hertfordshire, England. It is located on Stanstead Road opposite the Hundred Acre Estate and is backed by the New River.

Established in 1953 as Hoddesdon Secondary School, it adopted the name John Warner in 1968, after the man who established the first all-boys school for all classes and any religious beliefs in 1841.

The school has many facilities, including its sport centre which opened in 2001, (consisting of a swimming pool, several astro-turf pitches, sports hall and many other facilities), which is available for use by all students of the school, and also a newly built science block which was added in 2005, that aided the school in gaining the status of a Science College. Many local primary schools in the area have science lessons in the school's new laboratories. The school has specialist technology status. On 1 April 2011, the John Warner School was reformed to Academy status.

The school participates in many extra-curricular activities and events, including Model United Nations and the Vex Robotics Competition. It has also begun hosting its own MUN conferences.

The school is undergoing renovation to improve the experience of the pupils, with multiple new blocks being built, starting with a new Modern Foreign Languages block, an Engineering & DT block, a new library and temporary Mathematics department. As of May 2016 a new Mathematics block was being built.

== Academics ==
Ofsted reports:

Inspection date	Grade
2022-10-11	Inadequate
2019-02-06	Requires Improvement
2014-01-29	Good
2011-01-17	Outstanding
2007-11-08	Good

In February 2019 the school received an 'Requires Improvement' Ofsted report. Prior to its conversion to an academy in 2011 it had been rated outstanding

As of November 2020, the school offered a mixture of A-level, BTEC and OCR qualifications in its sixth form.

The school's GCSE results in 2018 were 43% strong 9-5 Passes for English and Maths, while the local average was 53%.

In 2007 the school received congratulations from Jim Knight, Minister of State for Education, for being placed 24th in the ‘100 most improved schools in the country’. This award is a combination of eight years' continuous improvement in examination results.
