= Charles Walker (British politician) =

British Conservative politician

Sir Charles Walker KBE
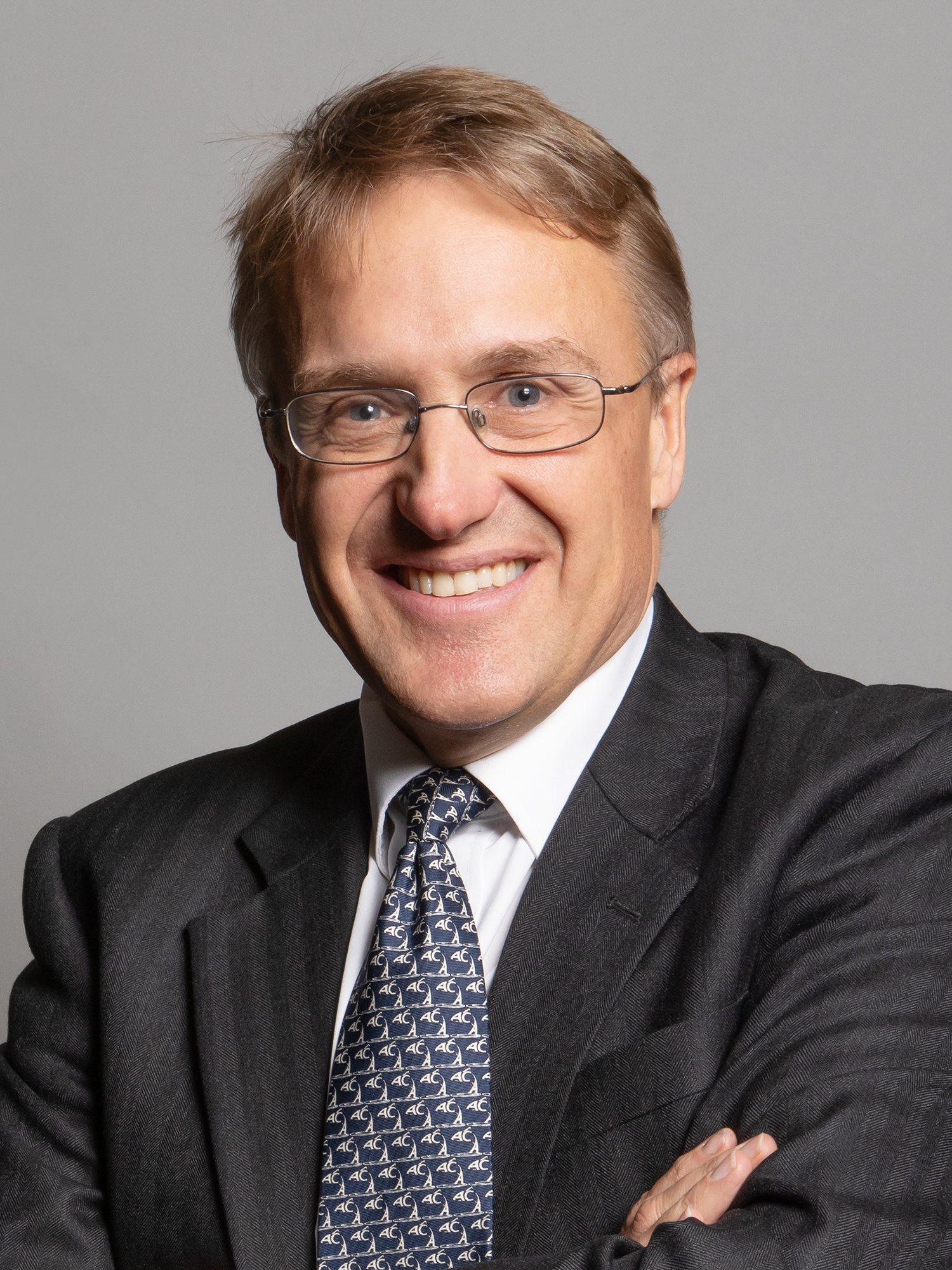
- Official portrait, 2020

Chair of the Administration Committee
- In office 18 March 2020 – 30 May 2024
- Preceded by: Paul Beresford
- Succeeded by: Nick Smith

Chair of the Procedure Committee
- In office 17 October 2012 – 5 November 2019
- Preceded by: Greg Knight
- Succeeded by: Karen Bradley

Chairman of the 1922 Committee
- Acting; 24 May 2019 – 3 September 2019 Serving with Cheryl Gillan
- Leader: Theresa May; Boris Johnson
- Preceded by: Graham Brady
- Succeeded by: Graham Brady

Member of Parliament for Broxbourne
- In office 5 May 2005 – 30 May 2024
- Preceded by: Marion Roe
- Succeeded by: Lewis Cocking

Personal details
- Born: Charles Ashley Rupert Walker; 11 September 1967 (age 59) Henley-on-Thames, Oxfordshire, England
- Party: Conservative
- Children: 3
- Education: University of Oregon (BS)

Sir Charles Ashley Rupert Walker (born 11 September 1967) is a British politician who served as chair of the House of Commons Procedure Committee from 2012 to 2019. A member of the Conservative Party, he was the Member of Parliament (MP) for Broxbourne in Hertfordshire from 2005 to 2024.

Walker was appointed an Officer of the Order of the British Empire (OBE) in the 2015 New Year Honours for political service, and was appointed a Knight Commander of the Order of the British Empire (KBE) in Theresa May's resignation honours on 10 September 2019, "for political and public service".

== Early life and career ==
Born in Henley-on-Thames in September 1967, Walker was privately educated at The American School in London, followed by the University of Oregon in the United States, receiving a Bachelor of Science in Political Science in 1990.

Walker pursued a career in marketing and communications and held senior positions within a number of businesses. He was on the board of directors of Blue Arrow. He belonged to the trade union Amicus. Walker was a member of Wandsworth Council from 2002 to 2006. He had previously stood unsuccessfully in Ealing North at the 2001 general election.

== Parliamentary career ==
=== Early parliamentary career (2005–2012) ===
At the 2005 general election, Walker was elected as Member of Parliament for Broxbourne. Notably, given his subsequent criticisms of the government led by Liz Truss (see "Retirement", below), in the Conservative Party's initial prospective candidate selection process Walker defeated the future prime minister, who had also made the party's shortlist for the Broxbourne seat. Upon election, he sat on the Scottish Select Committee from 2005 to 2010 and was also a member of the Public Administration Select Committee from 2007 to 2010. He was also a member of the House of Commons Privileges Committee.

Walker was one of the 23 MPs to sign the motion of no confidence in Speaker Michael Martin.

In 2011, Walker made what is believed by some to be the shortest Parliamentary speech in history, when he made a four-word contribution in a European Union debate on membership: "If not now, when?" (referring to the option of a referendum on the issue)

He joined the Panel of Chairs in 2010 and was co-chair of the Education Bill that went through committee in 2011. In May 2010, he was elected vice-chairman of the 1922 Committee and in the same year was elected to the Conservative Party Board.

=== House of Commons Procedure Committee (2012–2019) ===
In October 2012, Walker was elected as chair of the Procedure Committee, which decides on the process for election of a new Speaker of the House of Commons. In addition to his chairing duties, Walker was a member of the Speaker's Committee for the Independent Parliamentary Standards Authority (SCIPSA) and answered parliamentary questions on behalf of the committee.

In July 2013, Walker voted in favour of extending same-sex marriage to England and Wales.

In December 2013, Walker was the only MP to confirm he would accept an 11% pay increase. His championship of the pay rise and membership of the committee led to him being described by The Daily Telegraph as being in with an outside chance of becoming speaker when John Bercow stood down.

In the last parliamentary session before the 2015 general election, Walker explained what he knew about the Government decision to force a vote on changing the rules for electing a speaker for the next Parliament, in order to remove the then-Speaker John Bercow.

Walker said he had written a report on the subject "years ago" but although he had talked to William Hague and Michael Gove that week, neither had told him their objectives. He had only found out via the grapevine, and stated that he would rather be "an honourable fool" than part of a plot. The government lost the vote and Walker received a standing ovation from Labour MPs.

Following the 2015 general election, Walker was returned unopposed as chair of the Procedure Committee.

Walker was appointed an Officer of the Order of the British Empire (OBE) in the 2015 New Year Honours for political service, and was appointed a Knight Commander of the Order of the British Empire (KBE) in Theresa May's resignation honours on 10 September 2019, "for political and public service".

In May 2019, Walker and Cheryl Gillan became acting chairs of the 1922 Committee after Graham Brady resigned to consider standing in the leadership contest to succeed Theresa May as Conservative leader. They stood down when Brady returned to the role in September of that year.

=== Criticisms of COVID-19 lockdown restrictions (2020–2021) ===
In response to the Johnson government's attempt to control COVID-19 through a three tier system, Walker said in October 2020 that the government seemed to think it could "abolish death". He also accused the government's Scientific Advisory Group for Emergencies of choosing to "ramp up" the "fear factor" regarding the disease. Regarding the second tier regulations in November, Walker said "As we drift further into an authoritarian coercive state, the only legal mechanism left open to me is to vote against that legislation. The people of this country will never, ever forgive the political class for criminalising parents seeing children."

In November 2020, Walker called police officers a "disgrace" for enforcing government laws surrounding COVID-19 by arresting a 72-year-old woman who was "peacefully protesting" and who was charged under the Coronavirus Act. At the time, Walker called for the Constitution of the United Kingdom to be codified into a single written document (it is currently uncodified) to prevent further curbs on civil liberties.

On 25 March 2021, following a debate on the six-month extension of emergency powers during the COVID-19 lockdown, Walker made a widely reported speech in which he said:

For the next few days, I will walk around London with a pint of milk on my person because that pint will represent my protest. And there may be others who will choose too to walk around London with a pint of milk on their person as well and, perhaps, as we walk past each other in the street, our eyes might meet. We might even stop for a chat.

The speech was described as "surreal" by The Guardian, "bizarre" by The Independent, "astonishing" by Yahoo, and "odd" by indy100.

On 18 April 2021, Walker published an op-ed in The Daily Telegraph in which he stated his concern about the rumoured COVID vaccine passports, specifically by drawing parallels to other public health concerns not managed in the same way, such as obesity.

=== Retirement from the House of Commons (2022–present) ===
I think it's a shambles and a disgrace ... I hope all those people that put Liz Truss into Number 10, I hope it was worth it ... because the damage they have done to our party is extraordinary.

— Charles Walker's remarks on the market fallout, subsequent government crisis and Conservative unpopularity.

On 1 February 2022, Walker announced he would be standing down at the 2024 general election, saying there had been "a lot of grief and pain" in the country which had meant politics had become a "pretty toxic environment".

Walker endorsed Penny Mordaunt during the July 2022 Conservative Party leadership election. He became the fifth Conservative MP to publicly call for the Prime Minister Liz Truss to resign. During the government crisis on 19 October 2022, Walker called the Truss ministry "a shambles and a disgrace... utterly appalling", commenting of its supporters that he had "had enough of talentless people" for whom "it’s in their own personal interest to achieve a ministerial position".

== Recognition ==
In 2012, in a debate in Parliament on mental health issues and their "taboo", Walker spoke about his 30-year experience of obsessive–compulsive disorder, alongside the Labour MP Kevan Jones, who spoke about his own experience of having depression. Walker and Jones were both later praised for their speeches by Time to Change, a mental health anti-stigma campaign run by charities Mind and Rethink Mental Illness.

Walker has twice won The Spectator Speech of the Year at its annual Parliamentarian of the Year Awards: the first time in 2011 and the second time in 2012 when he shared the award with Kevan Jones. He was also one of The Spectator's Parliamentarians of the Year in 2013. In 2012, he was chosen as one of the Telegraph's "50 Great Britons" for that year and was also one of The Guardian's "Stories of 2012". He was awarded the President's Medal by the Royal College of Psychiatrists in November 2013.

== Personal life ==
Walker is the stepson of middle-distance runner and former Conservative MP Sir Christopher Chataway. He is married and has three children.

== Electoral history ==
General election 2019: Broxbourne
Party	Candidate	Votes	%	±%
Conservative	Charles Walker	30,631	65.6	+3.4
Labour	Sean Waters	10,824	23.2	–5.7
Liberal Democrats	Julia Bird	3,970	8.5	+5.4
Green	Nicholas Cox	1,281	2.7	+0.9
Majority		19,807	42.4	+9.1
Turnout		46,706	63.8	–2.5
Conservative hold		Swing	+4.6	

General election 2017: Broxbourne
Party	Candidate	Votes	%	±%
Conservative	Charles Walker	29,515	62.2	+6.1
Labour	Selina Norgrove	13,723	28.9	+10.5
UKIP	Tony Faulkner	1,918	4.0	–15.7
Liberal Democrats	Andy Graham	1,481	3.1	–0.1
Green	Tabitha Evans	848	1.8	–0.8
Majority		15,792	33.3	–3.1
Turnout		47,485	66.3	+3.2
Conservative hold		Swing	–2.2	

General election 2015: Broxbourne
Party	Candidate	Votes	%	±%
Conservative	Charles Walker	25,797	56.1	–2.7
UKIP	David Platt	9,074	19.7	+15.6
Labour	Edward Robinson	8,470	18.4	+0.8
Liberal Democrats	Anthony Rowlands	1,467	3.2	–10.2
Green	Russell Secker	1,216	2.6	New
Majority		16,723	36.4	–4.8
Turnout		46,024	63.1	–0.9
Conservative hold		Swing	–9.2	

General election 2010: Broxbourne
Party	Candidate	Votes	%	±%
Conservative	Charles Walker	26,844	58.8	+5.0
Labour	Michael Watson	8,040	17.6	–7.9
Liberal Democrats	Allan Witherick	6,107	13.4	+1.2
BNP	Steve McCole	2,159	4.7	0.0
UKIP	Martin J. Harvey	1,890	4.1	+0.5
English Democrat	Debbie Lemay	618	1.4	New
Majority		18,804	41.2	+12.9
Turnout		45,658	64.0	+4.3
Conservative hold		Swing	+4.7	

General election 2005: Broxbourne
Party	Candidate	Votes	%	±%
Conservative	Charles Walker	21,878	53.8	–0.3
Labour	Jamie Bolden	10,369	25.5	–4.9
Liberal Democrats	Andrew Porrer	4,973	12.2	+1.2
BNP	Andrew Emerson	1,929	4.7	+2.5
UKIP	Martin J. Harvey	1,479	3.6	+1.3
Majority		11,509	28.3	+4.6
Turnout		40,628	59.7	+4.0
Conservative hold		Swing	+2.3	

General election 2001: Ealing North
Party	Candidate	Votes	%	±%
Labour	Stephen Pound	25,022	55.7	+2.0
Conservative	Charles Walker	13,185	29.3	−7.9
Liberal Democrats	Francesco R. Fruzza	5,043	11.2	+4.2
UKIP	Daniel Moss	668	1.5	+0.2
Green	Astra Seibe	1,039	2.3	+1.4
Majority		11,837	26.3	+9.8
Turnout		44,957	58.0	−13.3
Registered electors		77,524		
Labour hold		Swing	+4.9	

Parliament of the United Kingdom
Preceded by Marion Roe	Member of Parliament for Broxbourne; 2005–2024	Succeeded by Lewis Cocking
