= Broxbourne (constituency) =

UK Parliament constituency (since 1983)

Coordinates: 51°43′40″N 0°04′00″W

- Borough constituency for the House of Commons
- Interactive map of boundaries since 2024
- Location within the East of England
- County: Hertfordshire
- Population: 98,790 (2011 census)
- Electorate: 75,454 (March 2020)
- Major settlements: Broxbourne; Hoddesdon; Cheshunt; Waltham Cross

Current constituency
- Created: 1983
- Member of Parliament: Lewis Cocking (Conservative)
- Seats: One
- Created from: East Hertfordshire; Welwyn Hatfield; Hertford and Stevenage

Broxbourne is a constituency in Hertfordshire currently represented in the House of Commons of the UK Parliament by Lewis Cocking of the Conservative Party since 2024. (Note: As with all constituencies, the constituency elects one Member of Parliament (MP) by the first past the post system of election at least every five years.)

== Constituency profile ==
The Broxbourne constituency is located in Hertfordshire and covers the Borough of Broxbourne and parts of East Hertfordshire district. It includes the connected towns of Waltham Cross, Cheshunt, Broxbourne and Hoddesdon and lies on the outskirts of Greater London. The constituency consists almost exclusively of low-unemployment census output areas, with walks, golf courses and leisure facilities, and (compared to Greater London) a relatively high proportion of the retired and the high-income self-employed. Broxbourne's economy is also supported by good railway links London.

Compared to national averages, residents of the constituency have slightly lower levels of education and average levels of wealth, professional employment and ethnic diversity. Most of the constituency is represented by Conservatives at the local council level with small numbers of councillors from other parties. Voters in the constituency strongly supported leaving the European Union in the 2016 referendum, with an estimated 65% in favour of Brexit.

== Boundaries and boundary changes ==
=== Historic ===
==== 1983–1997 ====
- The Borough of Broxbourne;
- The District of East Hertfordshire wards of Great Amwell, Little Amwell, and Stanstead; and
- The District of Welwyn Hatfield ward of Northaw.

Formed as a borough constituency primarily from parts of the abolished county constituency of East Hertfordshire, mainly consisting of the former Urban Districts of Cheshunt and Hoddesdon which had been combined to form the District of Broxbourne under the local government reorganisation of 1974 and also including the villages of Stanstead Abbotts and Great Amwell to the north and Northaw (transferred from Welwyn Hatfield) to the west.

==== 1997–2024 ====
Map of boundaries 1997–2024

- The Borough of Broxbourne; and
- The District of Welwyn Hatfield ward of Northaw.

The three District of East Hertfordshire wards were transferred to Hertford and Stortford.

=== Current ===
Following to the 2023 review of Westminster constituencies, and taking into account a local government boundary review in East Hertfordshire which came into effect in May 2023 the constituency is composed of the following from the 2024 general election:

- The Borough of Broxbourne.
- The District of East Hertfordshire wards of Great Amwell & Stansteads, and Hertford Heath & Brickendon

The parts in the District of Hertfordshire were transferred back from Hertford and Stortford, offset by the transfer of the orphan Northaw ward to Hertsmere.

== Members of Parliament ==
Election	Member	Party
1983	Dame Marion Roe	Conservative
2005	Sir Charles Walker	Conservative
2024	Lewis Cocking	Conservative

== Elections ==
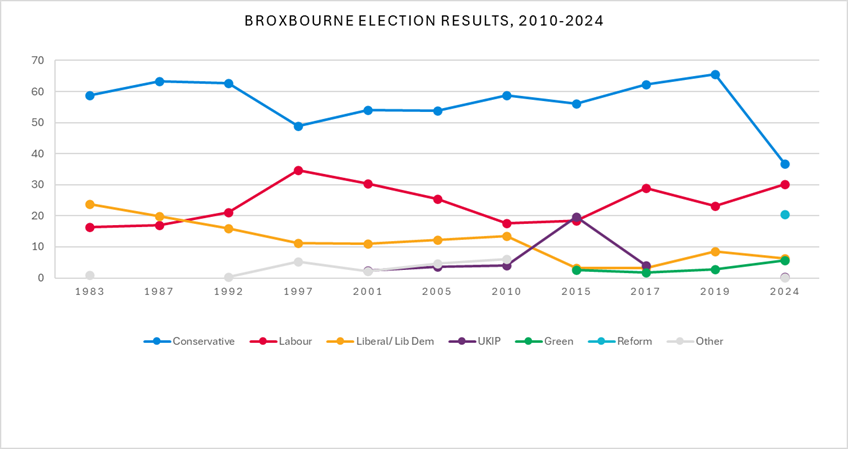
Broxbourne election results 1983–2024

=== Elections in the 2020s ===
General election 2024: Broxbourne
Party	Candidate	Votes	%	±%
Conservative	Lewis Cocking	15,810	36.8	−27.4
Labour	Catherine Deakin	12,952	30.2	+6.2
Reform	Tom Holdsworth	8,782	20.4	New
Liberal Democrats	Nick Belfitt	2,688	6.3	−2.7
Green	Owen Brett	2,461	5.7	+2.9
UKIP	Martin Harvey	172	0.4	New
English Constitution	Brett Frewin	87	0.2	New
Majority		2,858	6.6	−35.8
Turnout		42,952	57.3	−5.9
Registered electors		75,187		
Conservative hold		Swing	−16.8	

=== Elections in the 2010s ===
2019 notional result
Party	Vote	%
Conservative	30,627	64.2
Labour	11,435	24.0
Liberal Democrats	4,292	9.0
Green	1,321	2.8
Turnout	47,675	63.2
Electorate	75,454	

General election 2019: Broxbourne
Party	Candidate	Votes	%	±%
Conservative	Charles Walker	30,631	65.6	+3.4
Labour	Sean Waters	10,824	23.2	−5.7
Liberal Democrats	Julia Bird	3,970	8.5	+5.4
Green	Nicholas Cox	1,281	2.7	+0.9
Majority		19,807	42.4	+9.1
Turnout		46,706	63.8	−2.5
Conservative hold		Swing	+4.6	

General election 2017: Broxbourne
Party	Candidate	Votes	%	±%
Conservative	Charles Walker	29,515	62.2	+6.1
Labour	Selina Norgrove	13,723	28.9	+10.5
UKIP	Tony Faulkner	1,918	4.0	−15.7
Liberal Democrats	Andy Graham	1,481	3.1	−0.1
Green	Tabitha Evans	848	1.8	−0.8
Majority		15,792	33.3	−3.1
Turnout		47,485	66.3	+3.2
Conservative hold		Swing	−2.2	

General election 2015: Broxbourne
Party	Candidate	Votes	%	±%
Conservative	Charles Walker	25,797	56.1	−2.7
UKIP	David Platt	9,074	19.7	+15.6
Labour	Edward Robinson	8,470	18.4	+0.8
Liberal Democrats	Anthony Rowlands	1,467	3.2	−10.2
Green	Russell Secker	1,216	2.6	New
Majority		16,723	36.4	−4.8
Turnout		46,024	63.1	−0.9
Conservative hold		Swing	−9.2	

General election 2010: Broxbourne
Party	Candidate	Votes	%	±%
Conservative	Charles Walker	26,844	58.8	+5.0
Labour	Michael Watson	8,040	17.6	−7.9
Liberal Democrats	Allan Witherick	6,107	13.4	+1.2
BNP	Steve McCole	2,159	4.7	±0.0
UKIP	Martin J. Harvey	1,890	4.1	+0.5
English Democrat	Debbie Lemay	618	1.4	+1.4
Majority		18,804	41.2	+12.9
Turnout		45,658	64.0	+4.3
Conservative hold		Swing	+4.7	

=== Elections in the 2000s ===
General election 2005: Broxbourne
Party	Candidate	Votes	%	±%
Conservative	Charles Walker	21,878	53.8	−0.3
Labour	Jamie Bolden	10,369	25.5	−4.9
Liberal Democrats	Andrew Porrer	4,973	12.2	+1.2
BNP	Andrew Emerson	1,929	4.7	+2.5
UKIP	Martin J. Harvey	1,479	3.6	+1.3
Majority		11,509	28.3	+4.6
Turnout		40,628	59.7	+4.0
Conservative hold		Swing	+2.3	

General election 2001: Broxbourne
Party	Candidate	Votes	%	±%
Conservative	Marion Roe	20,487	54.1	+5.3
Labour	David Prendergast	11,494	30.4	−4.3
Liberal Democrats	Julia Davies	4,158	11.0	−0.3
UKIP	Martin Harvey	858	2.3	New
BNP	John Cope	848	2.2	+0.9
Majority		8,993	23.7	+9.6
Turnout		37,845	55.7	−14.6
Conservative hold		Swing	+4.8	

=== Elections in the 1990s ===
General election 1997: Broxbourne
Party	Candidate	Votes	%	±%
Conservative	Marion Roe	22,952	48.8	−13.4
Labour	Benjamin Coleman	16,299	34.7	+13.3
Liberal Democrats	Julia Davies	5,310	11.3	−4.7
Referendum	David Millward	1,633	3.5	New
BNP	David Bruce	610	1.3	New
National Liberal	Benjamin Cheetham	172	0.4	New
Majority		6,653	14.1	−27.5
Turnout		46,976	70.3	−9.6
Conservative hold		Swing	−13.7	

General election 1992: Broxbourne
Party	Candidate	Votes	%	±%
Conservative	Marion Roe	36,094	62.6	−0.6
Labour	Martin Hudson	12,124	21.0	+4.1
Liberal Democrats	Julia Davies	9,244	16.0	−3.9
Natural Law	George Woolhouse	198	0.3	New
Majority		23,970	41.6	−1.7
Turnout		57,660	79.9	+4.7
Conservative hold		Swing	−2.4	

=== Elections in the 1980s ===
General election 1987: Broxbourne
Party	Candidate	Votes	%	±%
Conservative	Marion Roe	33,567	63.2	+4.4
Liberal	Eunice Yates	10,572	19.9	−3.9
Labour	Philip Parry	8,984	16.9	+0.5
Majority		22,995	43.3	+8.3
Turnout		53,123	75.2	+1.2
Conservative hold		Swing	+4.1	

General election 1983: Broxbourne
Party	Candidate	Votes	%	±%
Conservative	Marion Roe	29,328	58.8	
Liberal	Brian Pollock	11,862	23.8	
Labour	Martin Stears	8,159	16.4	
BNP	John Smith	502	1.0	
Majority		17,466	35.0	
Turnout		49,851	74.0	
Conservative win (new seat)				

== See also ==
- List of parliamentary constituencies in Hertfordshire
