= Ilford South (electoral division) =

Electoral division in Greater London, 1973–1986

- Former electoral division for the Greater London Council
- District: Redbridge
- Electorate: 56,363 (1973); 54,817 (1977); 54,233 (1981)
- Area: 1,119 hectares (11.19 km^{2})

Former electoral division
- Created: 1973
- Abolished: 1986
- Member: 1
- Created from: Redbridge

Ilford South was an electoral division for the purposes of elections to the Greater London Council. The constituency elected one councillor for a four-year term in 1973, 1977 and 1981, with the final term extended for an extra year ahead of the abolition of the Greater London Council.

== History ==
It was planned to use the same boundaries as the Westminster Parliament constituencies for election of councillors to the Greater London Council (GLC), as had been the practice for elections to the predecessor London County Council, but those that existed in 1965 crossed the Greater London boundary. Until new constituencies could be settled, the 32 London boroughs were used as electoral areas. The London Borough of Redbridge formed the Redbridge electoral division. This was used for the Greater London Council elections in 1964, 1967 and 1970.

The new constituencies were settled following the Second Periodic Review of Westminster constituencies and the new electoral division matched the boundaries of the Ilford South parliamentary constituency.

It covered an area of 1,119 hectares (11.19 km^{2}).

== Elections ==
The Ilford South constituency was used for the Greater London Council elections in 1973, 1977 and 1981. One councillor was elected at each election using first-past-the-post voting.

=== 1973 election ===
The fourth election to the GLC (and first using revised boundaries) was held on 12 April 1973. The electorate was 56,363 and one Labour Party councillor was elected. The turnout was 38.6%. The councillor was elected for a three-year term. This was extended for an extra year in 1976 when the electoral cycle was switched to four-yearly.

1973 Greater London Council election: Ilford South
| Party | Candidate | Votes | % | ±% |
|---|---|---|---|---|
| Labour | Dennis Annesley Carradice | 9,678 | 44.47 | |
| Conservative | P. A. Chalkley | 8,556 | 39.30 | |
| Liberal | G. L. Wilson | 3,232 | 14.85 | |
| Communist | B. S. Wallington | 294 | 1.35 | |
| Turnout | | | | |
| Labour win (new seat) | | | | |

=== 1977 election ===
The fifth election to the GLC (and second using revised boundaries) was held on 5 May 1977. The electorate was 54,817 and one Conservative Party councillor was elected. The turnout was 45.3%. The councillor was elected for a four-year term.

1977 Greater London Council election: Ilford South
| Party | Candidate | Votes | % | ±% |
|---|---|---|---|---|
| Conservative | Arnold Kinzley | 13,979 | 56.26 | |
| Labour | Dennis Annesley Carradice | 8,317 | 33.46 | |
| Liberal | S. Toper | 1,430 | 5.75 | |
| National Front | D. F. Street | 1,129 | 4.54 | |
| Turnout | | | | |
| Conservative gain from Labour | | Swing | | |

=== 1981 election ===
The sixth and final election to the GLC (and third using revised boundaries) was held on 7 May 1981. The electorate was 54,233 and one Labour Party councillor was elected. The turnout was 46.6%. The councillor was elected for a four-year term, extended by an extra year by the Local Government (Interim Provisions) Act 1984, ahead of the abolition of the council.

1981 Greater London Council election: Ilford South
| Party | Candidate | Votes | % | ±% |
|---|---|---|---|---|
| Labour | Edward Stephen Gouge | 11,561 | 45.81 | |
| Conservative | Arnold Kinzley | 10,115 | 40.06 | |
| Liberal | Ralph J. Scott | 2,985 | 11.82 | |
| NNF | Peter J. Clark | 342 | 1.35 | |
| Ecology | David Matanle | 247 | 0.98 | |
| Turnout | | | | |
| Labour gain from Conservative | | Swing | | |
