= Redbridge (electoral division) =

Electoral division in Greater London, 1965–1973

- Former electoral division for the Greater London Council
- Redbridge electoral division boundaries
- District: London Borough of Redbridge
- Population: 244,800 (1969 estimate)
- Electorate: 174,419 (1964); 173,086 (1967); 183,054 (1970)
- Area: 13,954 acres (56.47 km^{2})

Former electoral division
- Created: 1965
- Abolished: 1973
- Member(s): 3
- Replaced by: Ilford North, Ilford South and Wanstead and Woodford

Redbridge was an electoral division for the purposes of elections to the Greater London Council. The constituency elected three councillors for a three-year term in 1964, 1967 and 1970.

== History ==
It was planned to use the same boundaries as the Westminster Parliament constituencies for election of councillors to the Greater London Council (GLC), as had been the practice for elections to the predecessor London County Council, but those that existed in 1965 crossed the Greater London boundary. Until new constituencies could be settled, the 32 London boroughs were used as electoral areas which therefore created a constituency called Redbridge.

The electoral division was replaced from 1973 by the single-member electoral divisions of Ilford North, Ilford South and Wanstead and Woodford.

== Elections ==
The Redbridge constituency was used for the Greater London Council elections in 1964, 1967 and 1970. Three councillors were elected at each election using first-past-the-post voting.

=== 1964 election ===
The first election was held on 9 April 1964, a year before the council came into its powers. The electorate was 174,419 and three Conservative Party councillors were elected. With 83,548 people voting, the turnout was 47.9%. The councillors were elected for a three-year term.

1964 Greater London Council election: Redbridge
Party	Candidate	Votes	%	±%
Conservative	Robert Mitchell	37,601		
Conservative	Francis Herbert James	36,785		
Conservative	Anne Sylvia Terry	36,259		
Labour	L. Fallaize	24,463		
Labour	A. F. J. Chorley	23,205		
Labour	A. E. O'Connor	22,440		
Liberal	G. S. Bellamy	17,901		
Liberal	K. H. N. Ives	17,622		
Liberal	D. F. Murphy	17,487		
Communist	P. J. Devine	3,885		
Turnout				
Conservative win (new seat)				
Conservative win (new seat)				
Conservative win (new seat)				

=== 1967 election ===
The second election was held on 13 April 1967. The electorate was 173,086 and three Conservative Party councillors were elected. With 72,880 people voting, the turnout was 42.1%. The councillors were elected for a three-year term.

1967 Greater London Council election: Redbridge
Party	Candidate	Votes	%	±%
Conservative	Robert Mitchell	45,445		
Conservative	Francis Herbert James	44,361		
Conservative	Neil Gordon Thorne	44,340		
Labour	J. Cuffe	44,340		
Labour	J. F. Keohane	15,508		
Labour	J. I. Tatch	15,447		
Liberal	R. A. Newland	8,279		
Liberal	M. M. Lorek	8,112		
Liberal	R. A. Strain	7,753		
Communist	P. J. Devine	2,966		
Turnout				
Conservative hold		Swing		
Conservative hold		Swing		
Conservative hold		Swing		

=== 1970 election ===
The third election was held on 9 April 1970. The electorate was 183,054 and three Conservative Party councillors were elected. With 62,026 people voting, the turnout was 33.9%. The councillors were elected for a three-year term.

1970 Greater London Council election: Redbridge
Party	Candidate	Votes	%	±%
Conservative	John Hammond	38,851		
Conservative	Robert Mitchell	38,544		
Conservative	Neil Gordon Thorne	38,111		
Labour	L. A. Emons	16,169		
Labour	A. F. J. Chorley	16,002		
Labour	A. M. O'Reilly	15,392		
Liberal	M. J. Hoskins	5,120		
Liberal	R. A. Newland	4,726		
Liberal	R. J. Scott	4,726		
Communist	E. M. Woddis	990		
Union Movement	P. J. Devine	526		
Turnout				
Conservative hold		Swing		
Conservative hold		Swing		
Conservative hold		Swing		
