= Borough of Broxbourne =

- Borough and non-metropolitan district
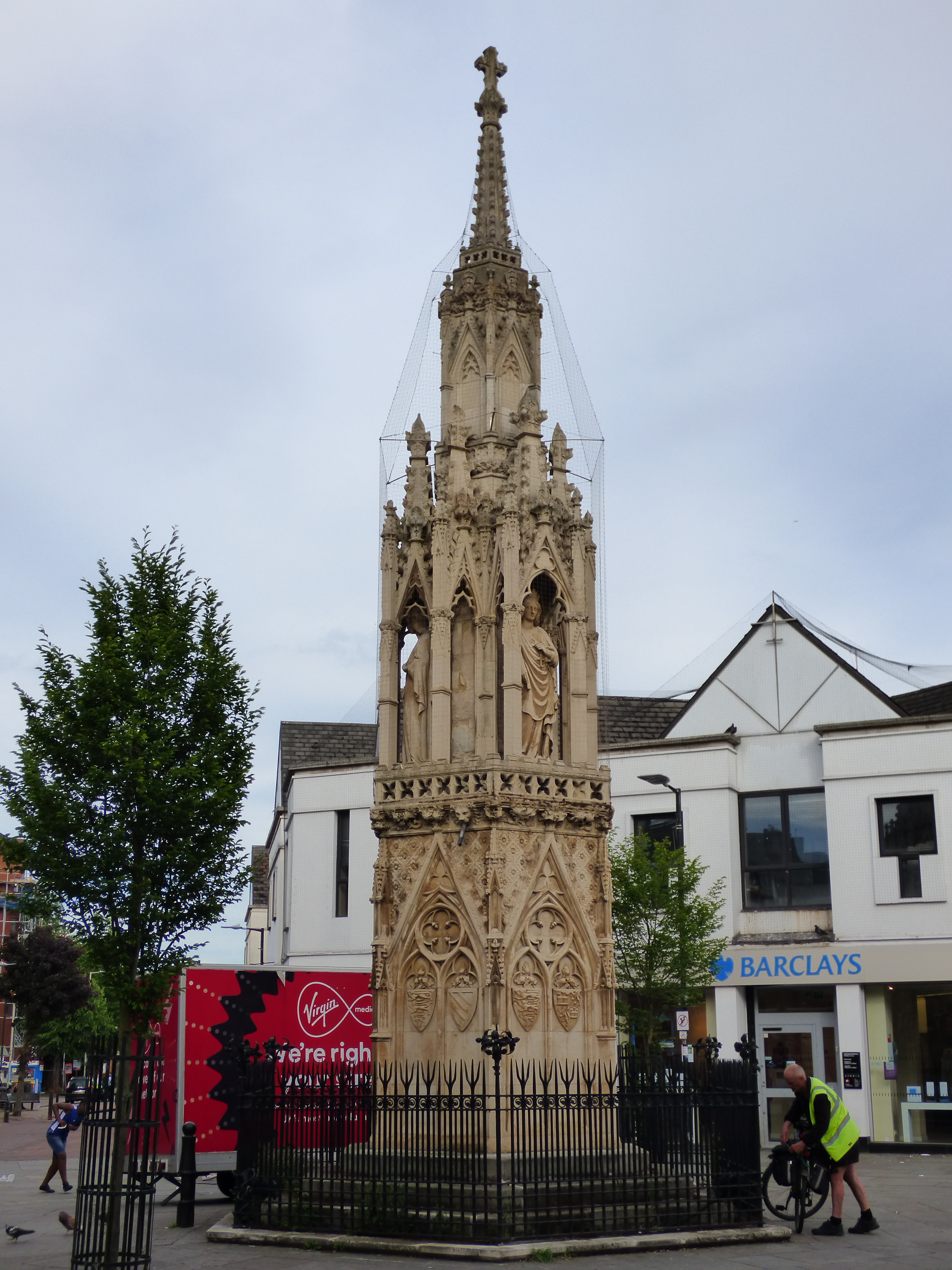
- The Eleanor Cross in Waltham Cross

- Coat of arms

- Broxbourne shown within Hertfordshire
- Sovereign state: United Kingdom
- Constituent country: England
- Region: East of England
- Non-metropolitan county: Hertfordshire
- Status: Non-metropolitan district, Borough
- Admin HQ: Cheshunt
- Incorporated: 1 April 1974

Government
  - Type: Non-metropolitan district council
  - Body: Broxbourne Borough Council
  - MPs: Lewis Cocking

Area
  - Total: 19.86 sq mi (51.43 km^{2})
  - Rank: 242nd (of 296)

Population (2024)
  - Total: 101,900
  - Rank: 245th (of 296)
  - Density: 5,132/sq mi (1,981/km^{2})

Ethnicity (2021)
  - Ethnic groups: List: 81.1% White; 6.7% Black; 4.6% other; 4% Mixed; 3.7% Asian

Religion (2021)
  - Religion: List: 53% Christianity; 33% no religion; 9.7% other; 4.3% Islam
- Time zone: UTC0 (GMT)
  - Summer (DST): UTC+1 (BST)
- ONS code: 26UB (ONS); E07000095 (GSS)
- OS grid reference: TL358021

The Borough of Broxbourne is a local government district with borough status in Hertfordshire, England. Its council is based in Cheshunt. Other settlements in the borough include Broxbourne, Hoddesdon and Waltham Cross. The eastern boundary of the district is the River Lea. The borough covers 20 square miles (52 km^{2}) in south east Hertfordshire, and had an estimated population of 99,000 in 2021.

Much of the borough lies within the Metropolitan Green Belt which surrounds London. The western side of the borough is largely rural with extensive areas of woodland, whilst the eastern part, particularly between the A10 road and the River Lea, is generally urban. Most of the built-up parts of Broxbourne fall within the Greater London Urban Area. The Lee Valley Park lies on the borough's eastern boundary.

The borough is twinned with the Sicilian city of Sutera.

== History ==
The borough of Broxbourne was created on 1 April 1974 under the Local Government Act 1972, covering the area of two districts, which were both abolished at the same time:

- Cheshunt Urban District
- Hoddesdon Urban District

The new district was named Broxbourne after the old village of that name at the centre of the area. The village had been administratively part of Hoddesdon Urban District since 1935. The name Broxbourne means "badger's stream", a fact referenced in the council's logo of a badger. The new district was awarded borough status from its creation, allowing the chair of the council to take the title of mayor.

Under current local government reorganisation plans, all district councils in Hertfordshire, as well as the county council, will be abolished in 2028, with Broxbourne becoming part of a new East Hertfordshire and Broxbourne unitary authority.

== Governance ==
Broxbourne Borough Council

Type
- Type: Non-metropolitan district

Leadership
- Mayor: Patsy Spears, Conservative since 13 May 2025
- Leader: Corina Gander, Conservative since 13 May 2025
- Chief Executive: Jeff Stack since December 2013

Structure
- Seats: 30
- Political groups: All parties (30) Conservative (25) Labour (3) Reform (2)

Elections
- Last election: 7 May 2026

Meeting place
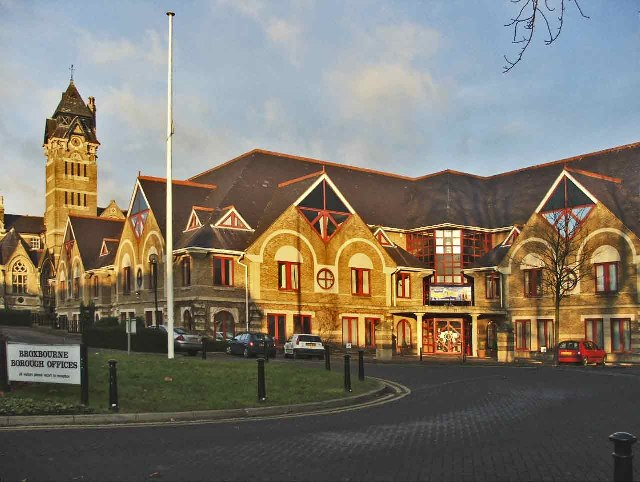
- Borough Offices, Bishop's College, Churchgate, Cheshunt, EN8 9XQ

Website
- www.broxbourne.gov.uk

Hertfordshire has a two-tier structure of local government, with the ten district councils (including Broxbourne Borough Council) providing district-level services, and Hertfordshire County Council providing county-level services.

=== Political control ===
The first elections to the council were held in 1973, initially acting as a shadow authority until the new arrangements took effect on 1 April 1974. The Conservatives have held a majority of the seats on the council since 1974:

Party in control	Years
Conservative	1974–present

=== Leadership ===
The role of mayor is largely ceremonial in Broxbourne, and is usually held by a different councillor each year. Political leadership is instead provided by the leader of the council. The leaders since 2010 have been:

Councillor	Party	From	To
Paul Mason	Conservative	2010	May 2014
Mark Mills-Bishop	Conservative	2014	14 May 2019
Lewis Cocking	Conservative	14 May 2019	May 2024
Mark Mills-Bishop	Conservative	14 May 2024	May 2025
Corina Gander	Conservative	13 May 2025	

=== Composition ===
Following the 2026 election, the composition of the council was as follows:

Party	Seats
Conservative	25
Labour	3
Reform	2
Total	30

The next elections are scheduled for 2027, but may be affected by the upcoming structural changes to local government in England.

=== Premises ===
The council is based at Bishops' College on Churchgate in Cheshunt. The building had been a college for training clergy and comprised an early eighteenth century house to which substantial extensions had been added in 1810 and 1871. The college closed in 1968 and the vacant building was bought in 1972 by Cheshunt Urban District Council. The building then passed to Broxbourne Borough Council on local government reorganisation in 1974. The council added a large modern extension, which was formally opened on 10 December 1986 by Prince Edward, Duke of Kent.

== Elections ==
Since the last ward boundary changes in 2012 the council has comprised 30 councillors, with the borough being divided into 10 wards each electing three councillors. Elections are held three years out of every four, electing one councillor from each ward each time. Elections to Hertfordshire County Council are held in the fourth year of the cycle when there are no borough council elections.

=== Wards ===
The borough's wards are:

- Hoddesdon North
- Hoddesdon Town & Rye Park
- Broxbourne & Hoddesdon South
- Wormley & Turnford
- Rosedale & Bury Green
- Goffs Oak
- Cheshunt North
- Cheshunt South & Theobalds
- Flamstead End
- Waltham Cross

== Arms ==
Coat of arms of Borough of Broxbourne

Notes
Granted 4 December 1974.
Crest
On a wreath Argent and Gules a demi badger Proper holding in the paws a cross formy Or.
Escutcheon
Per pale wavy Ermine and Gules on a chevron Or between in dexter chief a rose Gules slipped and leaved dimidiated with a thistle slipped Proper in sinister chief an oak tree eradicated Proper fructed Or and in base a Catherine wheel Sable a chevron couped per pale wavy Gules and Ermine.
Motto
Cor Unum Via Una (One Heart One Way)

== Business ==
The main industrial areas of the borough are around Waltham Cross and the Essex Road area of Hoddesdon.

Park Plaza at Waltham Cross is home to the world's largest printing plant, which produces publications for News International including The Sun, The Times and The Sun on Sunday (formerly the News of the World). Employing 200 people on a 23-acre (93,000 m^{2}) site to produce 86,000 newspapers per hour on each of its twelve printing presses (a total capacity of over 1,000,000 newspapers per hour), the plant cost £350 million and replaced the News International press in Wapping.
