= Kensington and Chelsea =

Kensington and Chelsea may refer to:

- Kensington and Chelsea (UK Parliament constituency), a constituency represented in the House of Commons of the Parliament of the United Kingdom
- The Royal Borough of Kensington and Chelsea, a London borough
- Kensington and Chelsea London Borough Council, a local authority
- Kensington and Chelsea (electoral division), Greater London Council
- Kensington and Chelsea College, a college of further and higher education
- Kensington and Chelsea TMO, a tenant management organisation
