= Chelsea (London County Council constituency) =

London County Council constituency

- Former constituency for the London County Council

Former constituency
- Created: 1919; 106 years ago
- Abolished: 1965; 60 years ago
- Member(s): 2 (to 1949); 3 (from 1949)

Chelsea was a constituency used for elections to the London County Council between 1889 and the council's abolition, in 1965. The seat shared boundaries with the UK Parliament constituency of the same name.

== Councillors ==
Year	Name	Party	Name	Party	Name	Party
1889	William Æneas Smith	Progressive	George William Osborn	Progressive	Two seats until 1949	
1892	William Æneas Smith	Progressive	Frank Costelloe	Progressive	Two seats until 1949	
1893	Edmund Turton	Progressive	Frank Costelloe	Progressive	Two seats until 1949	
1895	George Cadogan	Moderate	Frank Costelloe	Progressive	Two seats until 1949	
1895	Cecil Chapman	Moderate	Frank Costelloe	Progressive	Two seats until 1949	
1898	Emslie Horniman	Progressive	James Jeffery	Progressive	Two seats until 1949	
1907	Thomas Clarence Edward Goff	Municipal Reform	Ronald Collet Norman	Municipal Reform	Two seats until 1949	
1910	Ernest Louis Meinertzhagen	Municipal Reform	Ronald Collet Norman	Municipal Reform	Two seats until 1949	
1922	Ernest Louis Meinertzhagen	Municipal Reform	William Sidney	Municipal Reform	Two seats until 1949	
1933	Basil Futvoye Marsden-Smedley	Municipal Reform	William Sidney	Municipal Reform	Two seats until 1949	
1934	Basil Futvoye Marsden-Smedley	Municipal Reform	Catherine Fulford	Conservative	Two seats until 1949	
1946	John Vaughan-Morgan	Conservative	Catherine Fulford	Conservative	Two seats until 1949	
1949	John Vaughan-Morgan	Conservative	Catherine Fulford	Conservative	Alexander Lloyd	Conservative
1952	Marion Bennett	Conservative	Roderick Edwards	Conservative	Geoffrey Rippon	Conservative
1958	Marion Bennett	Conservative	Stuart Townend	Conservative	Geoffrey Rippon	Conservative
1961	John Elliott Brooks	Conservative	Stuart Townend	Conservative	Percy Rugg	Conservative

== Election results ==
1889 London County Council election: Chelsea
Party	Candidate	Votes	%	±%
Progressive	George William Osborn	3,170		
Progressive	William Æneas Smith	2,512		
Moderate	Leedham White	1,774		
Moderate	W. Jeffrey	1,647		
Independent	Charles Mossop	1,217		
Independent	Andrew Thompson	211		
Progressive win (new seat)				
Progressive win (new seat)				

1892 London County Council election: Chelsea
Party	Candidate	Votes	%	±%
Progressive	William Æneas Smith	3,332		
Progressive	Frank Costelloe	3,207		
Moderate	Cecil Chapman	2,930		
Moderate	John Humphrey	2,916		
Social Democratic Federation	Harry Quelch	170		
Social Democratic Federation	Walter Geard	126		
Progressive hold		Swing		
Progressive hold		Swing		

1895 London County Council election: Chelsea
Party	Candidate	Votes	%	±%
Moderate	George Cadogan	3,441		
Progressive	Frank Costelloe	3,355		
Moderate	Cecil Chapman	3,338		
Progressive	S. Insull	2,996		
Ind. Labour Party	Harold Snelling	218		
Moderate gain from Progressive		Swing		
Progressive hold		Swing		

In 1898, Horniman and Chapman tied on 3,675 votes after the initial count. A recount reduced Chapman's vote total by two, so Horniman was elected.

1898 London County Council election: Chelsea
Party	Candidate	Votes	%	±%
Progressive	James Jeffery	4,044		
Progressive	Emslie Horniman	3,675		
Moderate	Cecil Chapman	3,673		
Moderate	Ernest Louis Meinertzhagen	3,315		
Progressive gain from Moderate		Swing		
Progressive hold		Swing		

1901 London County Council election: Chelsea
Party	Candidate	Votes	%	±%
Progressive	James Jeffery	4,582	31.8	+4.3
Progressive	Emslie Horniman	4,481	31.1	+6.1
Conservative	Ernest Louis Meinertzhagen	2,682	18.6	−4.0
Conservative	William Elliott	2,659	18.5	−6.5
Progressive hold		Swing		
Progressive hold		Swing		

1904 London County Council election: Chelsea
Party	Candidate	Votes	%	±%
Progressive	James Jeffery	4,224		
Progressive	Emslie Horniman	4,143		
Conservative	Euston Sartorius	3,471		
Conservative	Clarence Goff	3,462		
Progressive hold		Swing		
Progressive hold		Swing		

1907 London County Council election: Chelsea
Party	Candidate	Votes	%	±%
Municipal Reform	Thomas Clarence Edward Goff	5,877		
Municipal Reform	Ronald Collet Norman	5,779		
Progressive	Emslie Horniman	3,977		
Progressive	John Jeffery	3,915		
Majority				
Municipal Reform gain from Progressive		Swing		
Municipal Reform gain from Progressive		Swing		

1910 London County Council election: Chelsea
Party	Candidate	Votes	%	±%
Municipal Reform	Ronald Collet Norman	4,935	32.1	
Municipal Reform	Ernest Louis Meinertzhagen	4,886	31.7	
Progressive	Leonard Costello	2,809	18.2	
Progressive	John Mackenzie	2,766	18.0	
Majority		2,077	13.5	
Municipal Reform hold		Swing		
Municipal Reform hold		Swing		

1913 London County Council election: Chelsea
Party	Candidate	Votes	%	±%
Municipal Reform	Ronald Collet Norman	5,200	33.6	+1.5
Municipal Reform	Ernest Louis Meinertzhagen	5,113	33.0	+1.3
Progressive	Katharine Wallas	2,598	16.8	−1.4
Progressive	George Schuster	2,569	16.6	−1.4
Majority		2,515	16.2	+2.7
Municipal Reform hold		Swing	+1.4	
Municipal Reform hold		Swing		

1919 London County Council election: Chelsea
Party	Candidate	Votes	%	±%
Municipal Reform	Ernest Louis Meinertzhagen	Unopposed	n/a	n/a
Municipal Reform	Ronald Collet Norman	Unopposed	n/a	n/a
Municipal Reform hold		Swing	n/a	
Municipal Reform hold		Swing	n/a	

1922 London County Council election: Chelsea
Party	Candidate	Votes	%	±%
Municipal Reform	William Sidney	7,727		n/a
Municipal Reform	Ernest Louis Meinertzhagen	7,655		n/a
Labour	J. T. Houlihan	3,214		n/a
Labour	C. M. Merrifield	3,203		n/a
Majority				n/a
Municipal Reform hold		Swing	n/a	
Municipal Reform hold		Swing	n/a	

1925 London County Council election: Chelsea
Party	Candidate	Votes	%	±%
Municipal Reform	William Sidney	5,947		
Municipal Reform	Ernest Louis Meinertzhagen	5,650		
Labour	Dora Russell	2,640		
Labour	A. L. Walton	2,141		
Progressive	Iolo Aneurin Williams	2,141		
Majority				
Municipal Reform hold		Swing		
Municipal Reform hold		Swing		

1928 London County Council election: Chelsea
Party	Candidate	Votes	%	±%
Municipal Reform	Ernest Louis Meinertzhagen	6,294		
Municipal Reform	William Sidney	6,178		
Liberal	Iolo Aneurin Williams	1,487		
Liberal	Amy Beatrice Huntington	1,318		
Labour	A. L. Walton	1,029		
Labour	P. A. Skinner	980		
Independent Labour	L. W. Potter	841		
Independent Labour	B. J. Gifford	823		
Majority				
Municipal Reform hold		Swing		
Municipal Reform hold		Swing		

1931 London County Council election: Chelsea
Party	Candidate	Votes	%	±%
Municipal Reform	Ernest Louis Meinertzhagen	6,186		
Municipal Reform	William Sidney	6,130		
Liberal	E. G. G. Bach	1,095		
Liberal	E. S. G. Bach	1,082		
Majority				
Municipal Reform hold		Swing		
Municipal Reform hold		Swing		

1934 London County Council election: Chelsea
Party	Candidate	Votes	%	±%
Municipal Reform	Basil Marsden-Smedley	6,174		
Municipal Reform	Catherine Fulford	6,105		
Labour	L. Arnold	2,235		
Labour	V. C. Elliott	2,216		
Majority				
Municipal Reform hold		Swing		
Municipal Reform hold		Swing		

1937 London County Council election: Chelsea
Party	Candidate	Votes	%	±%
Municipal Reform	Basil Marsden-Smedley	7,814		
Municipal Reform	Catherine Fulford	7,685		
Labour	P. A. Skinner	2,900		
Labour	G. Watson	2,850		
Majority				
Municipal Reform hold		Swing		
Municipal Reform hold		Swing		

1946 London County Council election: Chelsea
Party	Candidate	Votes	%	±%
Conservative	John Vaughan-Morgan	6,204		
Conservative	Catherine Fulford	6,186		
Labour	Mary Louisa Piercy	2,462		
Labour	R. C. Edmonds	2,442		
Majority				
Conservative hold		Swing		
Conservative hold		Swing		

1949 London County Council election: Chelsea
Party	Candidate	Votes	%	±%
Conservative	Alexander Lloyd	14,994		
Conservative	Catherine Fulford	14,902		
Conservative	John Vaughan-Morgan	14,829		
Labour	R. Edmonds	4,589		
Labour	F. L. Tonge	4,535		
Labour	Robin Davis	4,429		
Conservative win (new seat)				
Conservative hold		Swing		
Conservative hold		Swing		

1952 London County Council election: Chelsea
Party	Candidate	Votes	%	±%
Conservative	Roderick Edwards	15,814		
Conservative	Marion Bennett	15,789		
Conservative	Geoffrey Rippon	15,592		
Labour	J. Sofer	4,587		
Labour	H. Atkinson	4,511		
Labour	J. Allen	4,444		
Conservative hold		Swing		
Conservative hold		Swing		
Conservative hold		Swing		

1955 London County Council election: Chelsea
Party	Candidate	Votes	%	±%
Conservative	Roderick Edwards	12,473		
Conservative	Marion Edwards	12,465		
Conservative	Geoffrey Rippon	12,174		
Labour	H. J. Davies	2,406		
Labour	S. Fordyce	2,122		
Labour	S. Stratford-Lawrence	2,049		
Conservative hold		Swing		
Conservative hold		Swing		
Conservative hold		Swing		

1958 London County Council election: Chelsea
Party	Candidate	Votes	%	±%
Conservative	Marion Bennett	10,894		
Conservative	Stuart Townend	10,828		
Conservative	Geoffrey Rippon	10,689		
Labour	L. Bonham	2,660		
Labour	W. R. Johnson	2,633		
Labour	H. Halpin	2,626		
Liberal	H. Symons	2,157		
Liberal	Ruth Abrahams	2,139		
Liberal	J. Hart	2,081		
Conservative hold		Swing		
Conservative hold		Swing		
Conservative hold		Swing		

1961 London County Council election: Chelsea
Party	Candidate	Votes	%	±%
Conservative	John Elliott Brooks	10,991		
Conservative	Percy Rugg	10,914		
Conservative	Stuart Townend	10,786		
Liberal	S. Marsden-Smedley	2,764		
Liberal	Peter Guy Henry Thorold	2,486		
Labour	P. F. Corbett	2,482		
Labour	M. Baxter	2,469		
Liberal	J. L. Spicer	2,405		
Labour	M. Shufeldt	2,315		
Conservative hold		Swing		
Conservative hold		Swing		
Conservative hold		Swing		
