= Charles Whitmore =

Charles Whitmore may refer to:

- Charles Widmore, a fictional character on the American TV series Lost
- Charles Algernon Whitmore (1851–1908), British barrister and politician
