= A Lonely Night =

2016 song by the Weeknd

Song by the Weeknd

from the album Starboy
- Released: November 25, 2016
- Studio: MXM (Los Angeles, California) MXM, Wolf Cousin Studios (Stockholm, Sweden)
- Genre: Electro-funk
- Length: 3:40
- Label: XO; Republic
- Songwriters: Abel Tesfaye; Max Martin; Peter Svensson; Savan Kotecha; Ali Payami; Ahmad Balshe; Jason Quenneville
- Producers: Ali Payami; Max Martin

"A Lonely Night" is a song by Canadian singer-songwriter the Weeknd from his third studio album Starboy (2016). It was written by the Weeknd, Peter Svensson, Savan Kotecha, Belly, DaHeala, and produced by Ali Payami and Max Martin. The song was the subject of a copyright infringement lawsuit.

== Composition ==
"A Lonely Night" is a post-disco inspired electro-funk song with a prominent staccato bassline and a drum beat reminiscent of that used on Michael Jackson's "Billie Jean". It is composed in the key of G minor.

Lyrically, the song is a warning against a woman getting too attached in a relationship. Where he states "There's nothing between us". Making connections to the album's reoccurring theme of teetering on the verge of greatness but being held back by loneliness and the need for a relationship.

== Critical reception ==
The song was well received by music critics, with many complimenting the song's catchiness, production and the Weeknd's throwback sound inspired by Michael Jackson. Kirsten Spruch from baeblemusic.com named it "Song of the Day" on November 29, 2016, saying that "The bubbly synth-basses and catchy chorus make for a song you can't not dance to."

== Chart performance ==
Like the rest of the tracks from Starboy, "A Lonely Night" charted on the US Billboard Hot 100, reaching number 69. The song also charted and peaked at number 40 on the Canadian Hot 100. Despite not being released as a single, the song managed to chart within the Canadian Hot AC Airplay chart, peaking at number 45 and charting for three weeks.

== Copyright infringement lawsuit ==
In 2019, three British songwriters: Williams "Billy" Smith, Brian Clover and Scott McCulloch sued the Weeknd and Belly for copyright infringement. They claimed that the 2016 Starboy track was a blatant copy of their 2004 song "I Need to Love". The songwriters demanded an unspecified amount of damages, alongside $150,000 per infringement and forensic accounting to figure out how much they felt they were owed. During the trial, the Weeknd was represented by UK law firm Russels. The copyright case was later won by the Weeknd after a ruling by the Central District Court of California. The Smith, Clover, McCulloch v. The Weeknd case was the second infringement lawsuit against a track from Starboy.

== Charts ==
Chart (2016–2017)	Peak position
Canada Hot 100 (Billboard)	40
Canada Hot AC (Billboard)	45
Czech Republic Singles Digital (ČNS IFPI)	72
France (SNEP)	117
Ireland (IRMA)	69
Netherlands (Single Top 100)	72
Portugal (AFP)	57
Slovakia Singles Digital (ČNS IFPI)	29
Sweden (Sverigetopplistan)	67
UK Singles (OCC)	53
UK Hip Hop/R&B (OCC)	11
US Billboard Hot 100	69
US Hot R&B/Hip-Hop Songs (Billboard)	37

== Certifications ==
Region	Certification	Certified units/sales
Canada (Music Canada)	Gold	40,000^{‡}
United Kingdom (BPI)	Silver	200,000^{‡}
^{‡} Sales+streaming figures based on certification alone.
