= John Litchfield =

John Litchfield may refer to:

- John Litchfield (sailor), US Navy sailor, namesake of the USS Litchfield
- John Litchfield (politician), British Royal Navy officer and politician
