= Margaret Dilke =

British writer and campaigner for women's rights (1857–1914)

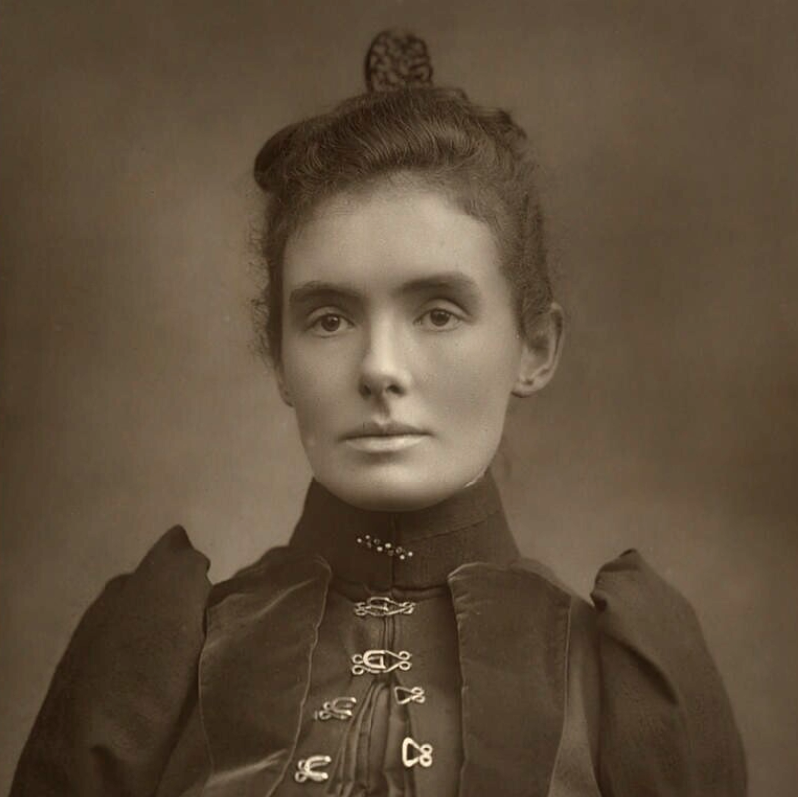
- Born: Margaret Mary Smith; 4 September 1857
- Died: 19 May 1914 (aged 56); Newport, Isle of Wight, England, United Kingdom of Great Britain and Ireland
- Burial place: Brookwood Cemetery, Surrey, England
- Other names: Mrs. William Russell Cooke
- Occupation: Campaigner for women's rights
- Organization(s): National Society for Women's Suffrage; Central National Society for Women’s Suffrage
- Spouses: Ashton Wentworth Dilke (m. 1876; died 1883) William Russell Cooke (m. 1891)
- Father: Thomas Eustace Smith

Margaret "Maye" Dilke born Margaret Mary Smith became "Mrs. William Russell Cooke" (4 September 1857 – 19 May 1914) was a British writer, suffragist and campaigner for women's rights.

== Life ==
Dilke was born in 1857. Her parents were Martha Mary (née Dalrymple) and the shipping magnate and politician Thomas Eustace Smith. She was raised at Gosforth House, Newcastle-upon-Tyne. Her father owned Newcastle shipping interests and he was a Liberal MP for Tynemouth (1868–85). Her parents travelled widely and they were patrons of the arts and this included particularly the Pre-Raphaelites. She had five other sisters and they were educated at home as well as in Lausanne in Switzerland. Margaret also went to Orléans, where she qualified as a French teacher.

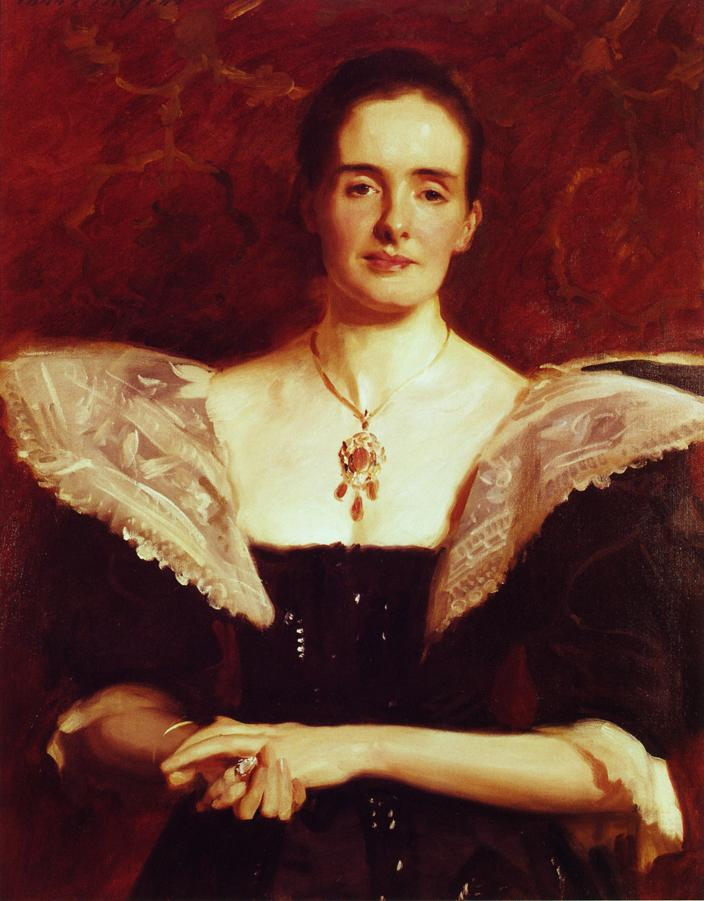
"Mrs. William Russell Cooke" by John Singer Sargent, 1895

Margaret married in 1876 Ashton Wentworth Dilke. Her sister Virginia who had a talent for languages married a Scottish lawyer named Donald Crawford who become MP for North-East Lanarkshire on 27 July 1881. In 1878 Margaret joined the National Society for Women's Suffrage and sat on its executive. She later joined the Central National Society for Women’s Suffrage.

Dilke's husband resigned his seat in parliament in 1883 as he had tuberculosis. He died that year in Algiers. Her husband's brother Charles became the guardian of their children. In 1883, Dilke became a trustee of the Weekly Dispatch newspaper.

In 1885 her sister, Virginia, told her husband, Donald, that she had an affair with Sir Charles Dilke, 2nd Baronet, Margaret's brother-in-law. The divorce destroyed her reputation, that of Sir Charles Dilke and eventually involved her mother Ellen Dilke and her sister's real lover. The divorce led to two court cases which attracted much interest.

Dilke's sister, Virginia's, messy divorce completed in 1885 and after a trip abroad she returned to England, where she stayed with Maye. Virginia was a social pariah and Maye interceded by obtaining work for her with W. T. Stead. He was the editor of Pall Mall Gazette.

In 1888 she went to Washington D.C. in the United States to attend the first International Council of Women. The conference was not about suffrage as this was too contentious but involved 49 delegates who were women leaders from nine countries.

In 1891, she married William Russell Cooke and she had two more children. Her husband was a solicitor who had founded Russell-Cooke Solicitors in 1880 with his brother.

== Death and legacy ==
Dilke died a widow at Bellecroft in Newport, the Island home of the Cooke family, in 1914 and was buried alongside her late husband, William Russell Cooke at Brookwood Cemetery. Dilke had published a book titled "Women's Suffrage" in 1885. The book went through the usual reasons given for giving women the vote and justifying women's demand for equality. It was published as a volume in Charles Buxton's Imperial Parliament series.
