= Chelsea (electoral division) =

Electoral division in Greater London, 1973–1986

- Former electoral division for the Greater London Council
- Chelsea electoral division boundaries
- District: Kensington and Chelsea
- Electorate: 68,305 (1973); 61,260 (1977); 54,034 (1981)
- Major settlements: Chelsea
- Area: 563 hectares (5.63 km^{2})

Former electoral division
- Created: 1973
- Abolished: 1986
- Member: 1
- Created from: Kensington and Chelsea

Chelsea was an electoral division for the purposes of elections to the Greater London Council. The constituency elected one councillor for a four-year term in 1973, 1977 and 1981, with the final term extended for an extra year ahead of the abolition of the Greater London Council.

== History ==
It was planned to use the same boundaries as the Westminster Parliament constituencies for election of councillors to the Greater London Council (GLC), as had been the practice for elections to the predecessor London County Council, but those that existed in 1965 crossed the Greater London boundary. Until new constituencies could be settled, the 32 London boroughs were used as electoral areas. The London Borough of Kensington and Chelsea formed the Kensington and Chelsea electoral division. This was used for the Greater London Council elections in 1964, 1967 and 1970.

The new constituencies were settled following the Second Periodic Review of Westminster constituencies and the new electoral division matched the boundaries of the Chelsea parliamentary constituency.

The area was in a long-term period of population decline that was yet to reverse. The electorate reduced from 68,305 in 1973 to 54,034 in 1984. It covered an area of 563 hectares (5.63 km^{2}).

== Elections ==
The Chelsea constituency was used for the Greater London Council elections in 1973, 1977 and 1981. One councillor was elected at each election using first-past-the-post voting.

=== 1973 election ===
The fourth election to the GLC (and first using revised boundaries) was held on 12 April 1973. The electorate was 68,305 and one Conservative Party councillor was elected. The turnout was 25.4%. The councillor was elected for a three-year term. This was extended for an extra year in 1976 when the electoral cycle was switched to four-yearly.

1973 Greater London Council election: Chelsea
Party	Candidate	Votes	%	±%
Conservative	William A. O. J. Bell	12,811	73.84	
Labour	S. H. Shapiro	4,531	26.16	
Turnout				
Conservative win (new seat)				

=== 1977 election ===
The fifth election to the GLC (and second using revised boundaries) was held on 5 May 1977. The electorate was 61,260 and one Conservative Party councillor was elected. The turnout was 32.9%. The councillor was elected for a four-year term.

1977 Greater London Council election: Chelsea
Party	Candidate	Votes	%	±%
Conservative	William A. O. J. Bell	14,525	72.06	
Labour	R. A. Banton	3,030	15.03	
Liberal	P. G. Driver	1,354	6.72	
GLC Abolitionist Campaign	O. P. Stutchbury	817	4.05	
National Front	E. V. French	437	2.17	
Turnout				
Conservative hold		Swing		

=== 1981 election ===
The sixth and final election to the GLC (and third using revised boundaries) was held on 7 May 1981. The electorate was 54,034 and one Conservative Party councillor was elected. The turnout was 35.4%. The councillor was elected for a four-year term, extended by an extra year by the Local Government (Interim Provisions) Act 1984, ahead of the abolition of the council.

1981 Greater London Council election: Chelsea
Party	Candidate	Votes	%	±%
Conservative	William A. O. J. Bell	12,131	63.66	
Labour	Stephen Benn	3,810	20.00	
Liberal	Jennifer M. Ware	2,793	14.65	
Save London Action Group	Mary P. W. Colmore	316	1.66	
Turnout				
Conservative hold		Swing		
