= 1961 London County Council election =

1961 local election in England

- 13 April 1961
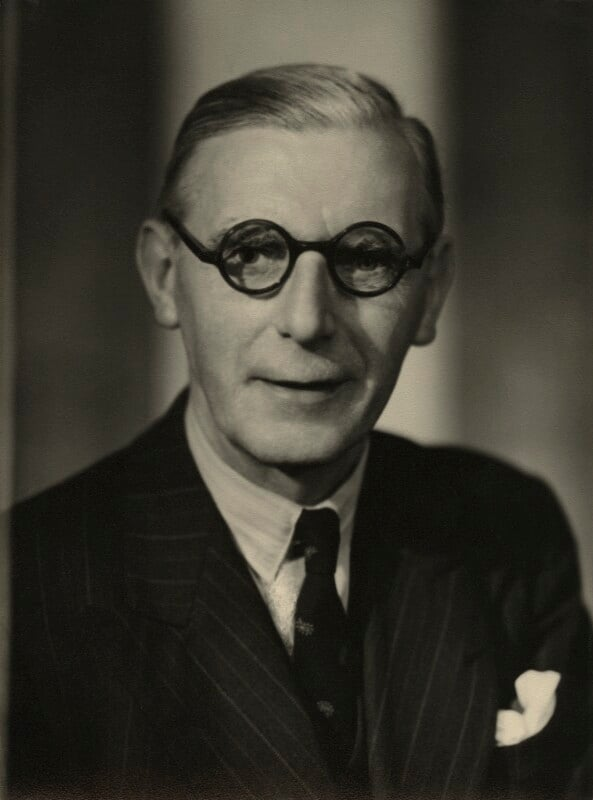

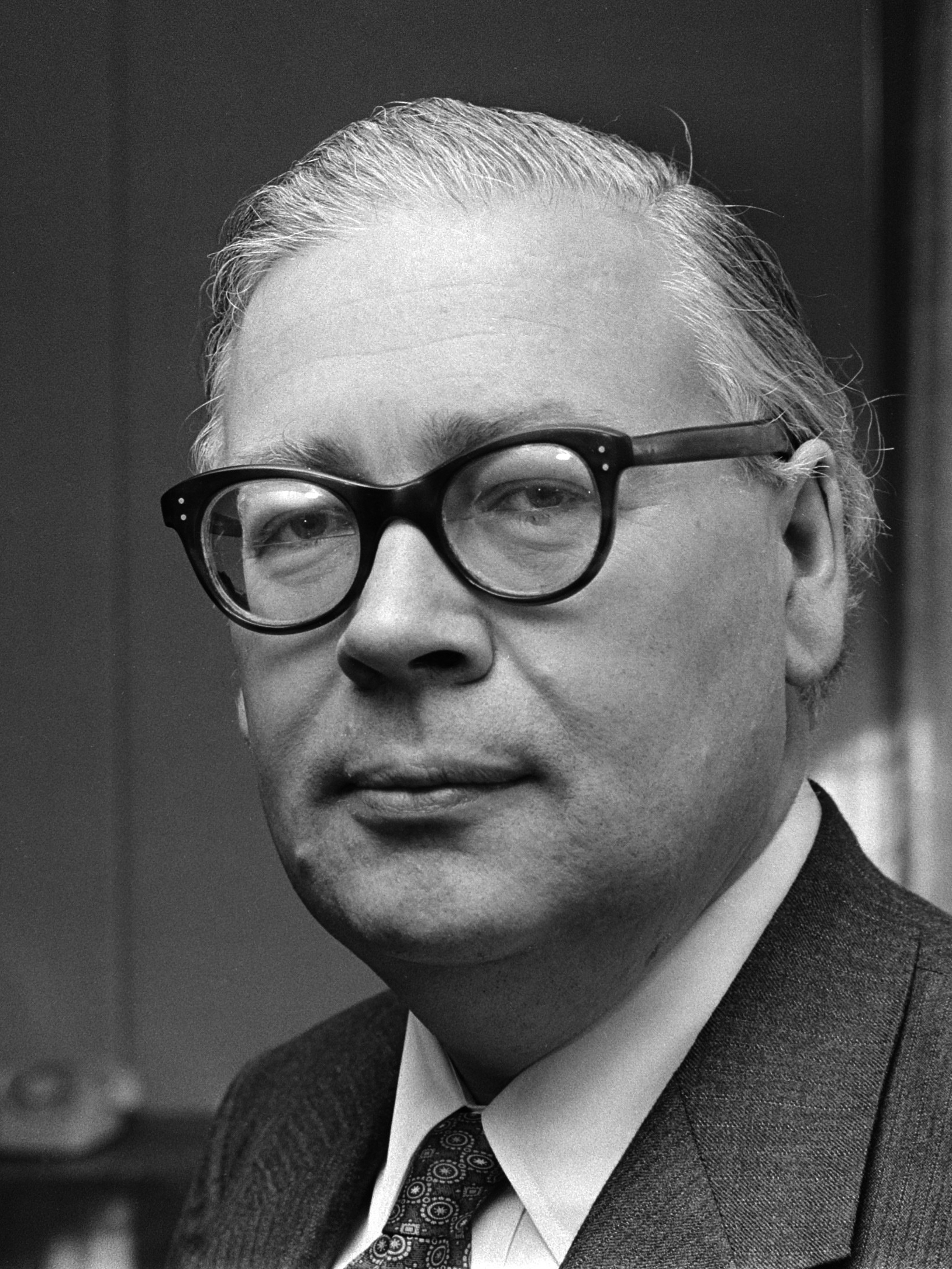
	First party	Second party
Leader	Isaac Hayward	Geoffrey Rippon
Party	Labour	Conservative
Leader since	1947	22 April 1958
Leader's seat	Alderman	Chelsea
Seats won	84	42
Seat change	▼17	▲17

An election to the County Council of London occurred on 13 April 1961. It was the last election to the council, and plans for its replacement by the Greater London Council were already in process. The council was elected by First Past the Post, with each elector having three votes in the three-member seats.

== Campaign ==
The campaign attracted little attention. The Conservative Party campaign focused on housing issues. The London Labour Party organised a tour of twenty cars through South East London, carrying politicians who made short speeches at numerous locations in the area. Other election issues included the proposed construction of the Royal National Theatre and the London Ringways road schemes.

== Results ==
The Labour Party lost seventeen seats to the Conservative Party but still secured a substantial majority of seats on the council. This ensured that the Labour Party would complete thirty years in control of the council.

The Liberal Party hoped to win at least one seat in the election but failed. The Independent Labour Party, Union Movement and British National Party also stood candidates but failed to secure any seats, as did assorted independent candidates.

Turnout in the election was 34.7%, an increase of 3.2% over the previous election. A closely fought contest in Fulham led to a turnout of 47%, a record for the seat.

Party	Votes			Seats	
Party	Number	%	Stood	Seats	%
Labour	403,680	50.4	126	84	66.7
Conservative	336,468	42.0	126	42	33.3
Liberal	47,845	6.0	69	0	0.0
Communist	7,622	1.0	5	0	0.0
British National	3,695	0.5	3	0	0.0
Union Movement	2,605	0.3	3	0	0.0
Independent	2,094	0.3	2	0	0.0
Ind. Labour Party	1,633	0.2	3	0	0.0
Alert Party	672	0.1	2	0	0.0
