= Virginia Mary Crawford =

British Catholic suffragist, feminist, journalist and author (1862–1948)

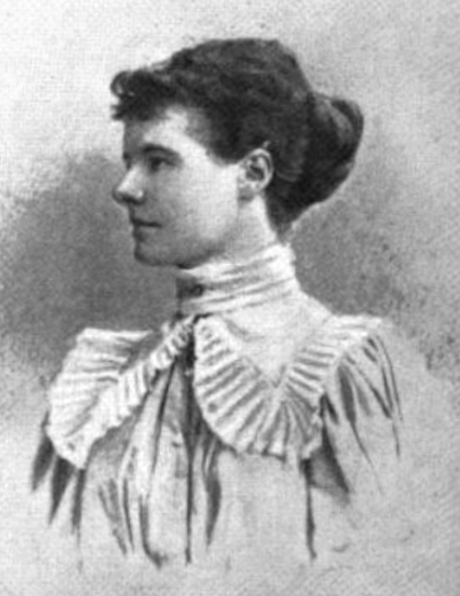
- In The Sketch, 15 January 1896
- Born: Virginia Mary Smith; 20 November 1862; Newcastle upon Tyne, England
- Died: 19 October 1948 (aged 85); Holland Park, London, England
- Known for: Catholic suffragist, feminist, journalist and author
- Movement: Catholic Women's Suffrage Society
- Spouse(s): Donald Crawford, divorced her citing Dilke in 1886
- Parents: Thomas Eustace Smith (father); Martha Mary Dalrymple, also known as Ellen (mother)

Virginia Mary Crawford (20 November 1862 – 19 October 1948) was a British Catholic suffragist, feminist, journalist and author, cited in the publicised Dilke scandal and divorce in 1886, founder of the Catholic Women's Suffrage Society.

== Life and career ==
Born at Gosforth House, Northumberland on 20 November 1862, Virginia Mary Smith, sixth child of Thomas Eustace Smith, a Liberal politician and shipowner and Martha Mary Dalrymple (also known as Ellen). She had five sisters and four brothers.

Virginia Smith married the Scottish advocate and Liberal politician Donald Crawford in 1881; but she is known for naming Sir Charles Dilke, another Liberal politician, as her lover, from 1882 for two years or more, in the divorce case brought against her and Dilke by her husband, a year after their marriage in 1885. Virginia Crawford was not called to give evidence, but her husband had heard her confess to this affair and thus succeeded in the divorce. The subsequent scandal caused the political downfall of Dilke, and her parents' social standing was diminished: it was hinted that Dilke had had an earlier affair with Ellen Smith, Dilke's brother's mother-in-law, and other lurid claims were revealed, when Dilke tried unsuccessfully to clear himself). Novelists Thomas Hardy and Henry James, close to both families and their circle, were said to have drawn on this scandal in their fiction.

Crawford was able to move on from her perceived roles (victim or femme fatale). She "survived the scandal and carved out another plot for herself, one that included a public life as both author and activist."

Her elder sister Margaret Eustace Smith (Maye) helped Virginia Crawford to meet W.T. Stead, an enemy of Dilke, and editor of Pall Mall Gazette. It started up a writing career, and she assisted research for other authors, such as Irish author George Moore, as well as conducting a journalistic interview with Cardinal Manning in 1888. Crawford converted to Catholicism the following year, claiming this had changed her life unrecognisably. Crawford wrote over 130 articles and many books on themes from Italian art, such as Raphael and Fra Angelico, to French and Belgian and other European literature, such as Maeterlinck and D'Annunzio. Her literary writings were re-published as recently as 2010, as well as those on women's rights in the workplace and on social issues, with Crawford's Ideals of Charity also republished in 2010.

Crawford wrote regularly for publications such as Littell's Living Age, Dublin Review, Contemporary Review and co-wrote religious publications as well as articles in the Month, a Catholic magazine and Catholic World.

== Role in feminist and suffrage movements ==
Crawford wrote in the Fortnightly Review, April 1897, 'What we in England bluntly call women's rights, the French call 'Feminism' ", after a visit from Christian feminists from France, the previous year, who wanted to share the campaign to remove the societal constraints on women. Crawford also knew about the movements of Catholic activists in Belgium, Switzerland and Italy. In 1901, Crawford spoke in French, in Milan on women's suffrage, becoming the first woman to speak to a crowd in the Milan Archbishop's Palace grounds.

Because in Britain, Catholics were a minority numerically, Crawford urged in 1908, that "the days are gone by" when Catholic women "could be content to be mere onlookers of contemporary politics." Unlike the prevailing view among many men of the time, including the editor of the Catholic Herald and many clergy, Crawford believed that the Christian faith teaching and working for women's enfranchisement were complementary not contradictory. To improve the chances of success for winning women's rights to vote, Crawford realised that Catholics would have to work with non-sectarian groups such as the Women's Social and Political Union (WSPU), the Women's Freedom League, and the 'milder' National Union of Women's Suffrage Societies. Fellow Catholic feminist, Charlotte Despard, went on Ash Wednesday 1907 to join the WSPU protest at the House of Commons, which ended in violence and her arrest.

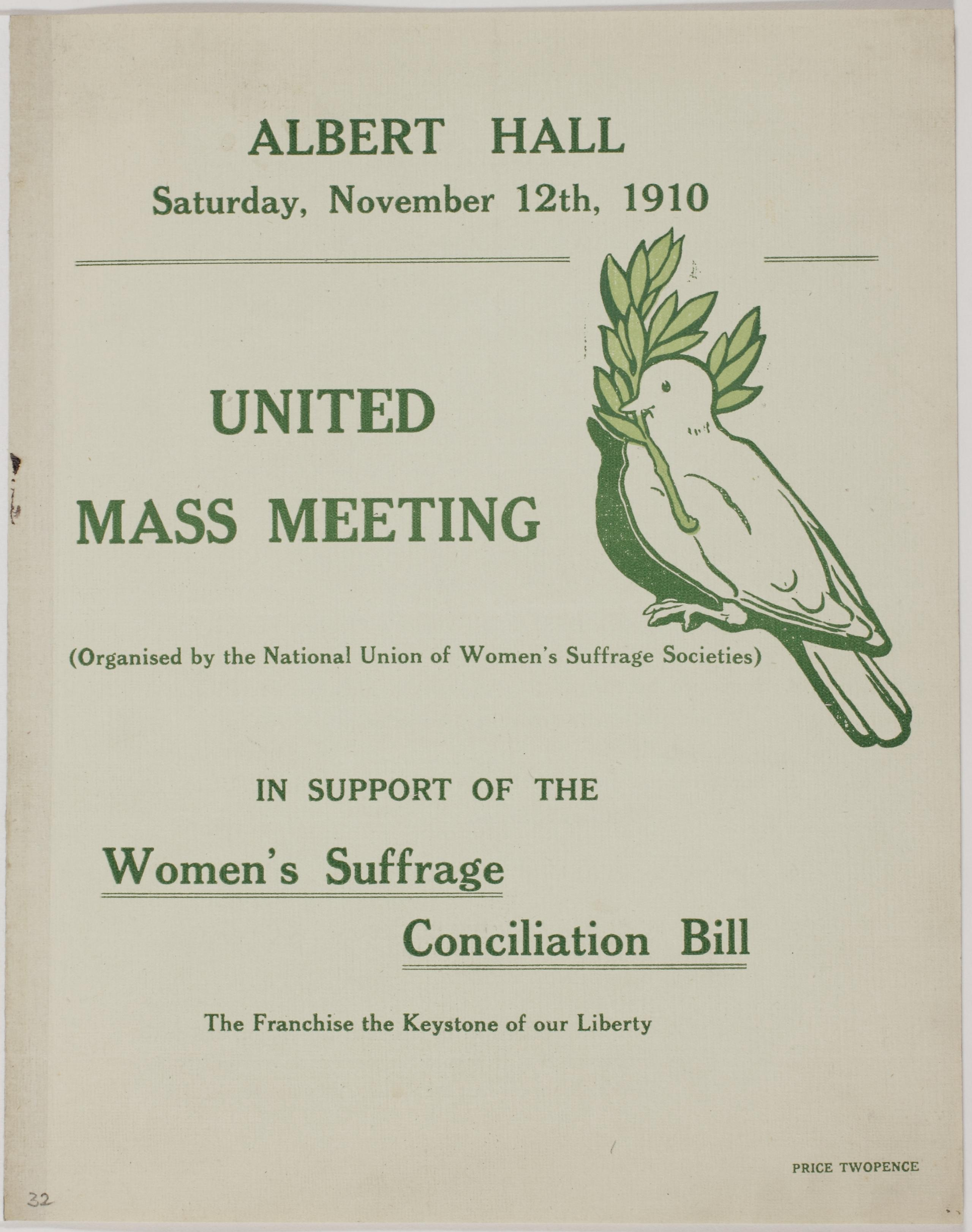
Notice for United Mass meeting of suffragists, November 1910

Crawford was one of the organisers of the 1910 Women's March in London where thousands of women peacefully processed to the Albert Hall. In 1911, a small group of 'tres feministe et tres orthodoxe' women founded a Catholic Women's Suffrage Society to expressly secure equality of suffrage for men and women, and to alleviate the 'hard and dehumanizing' workplaces affecting millions of working women. The foundation of the group was controversial with some criticising its lack of universality and others seeing voting rights as too controversial to be supported by people of the Catholic faith. Crawford did not support the argument that seeking votes for women was 'essentially anti-religious'. The group however came to a compromise with activists from the other suffrage organisations, not excluding them but also not allowing them to represent CWSS at any militant activities. Militancy and arson, window-smashing and other criminal actions for women's rights divided Catholic opinion, especially when worship was disrupted to protest forced feeding of prisoners. But other Catholic activists, like Alice Abadam, urged church women to move from small charitable activities to help the poor to turn to women's suffrage campaigning to "influence the lives of millions of their poor and unprotected sisters for the good."

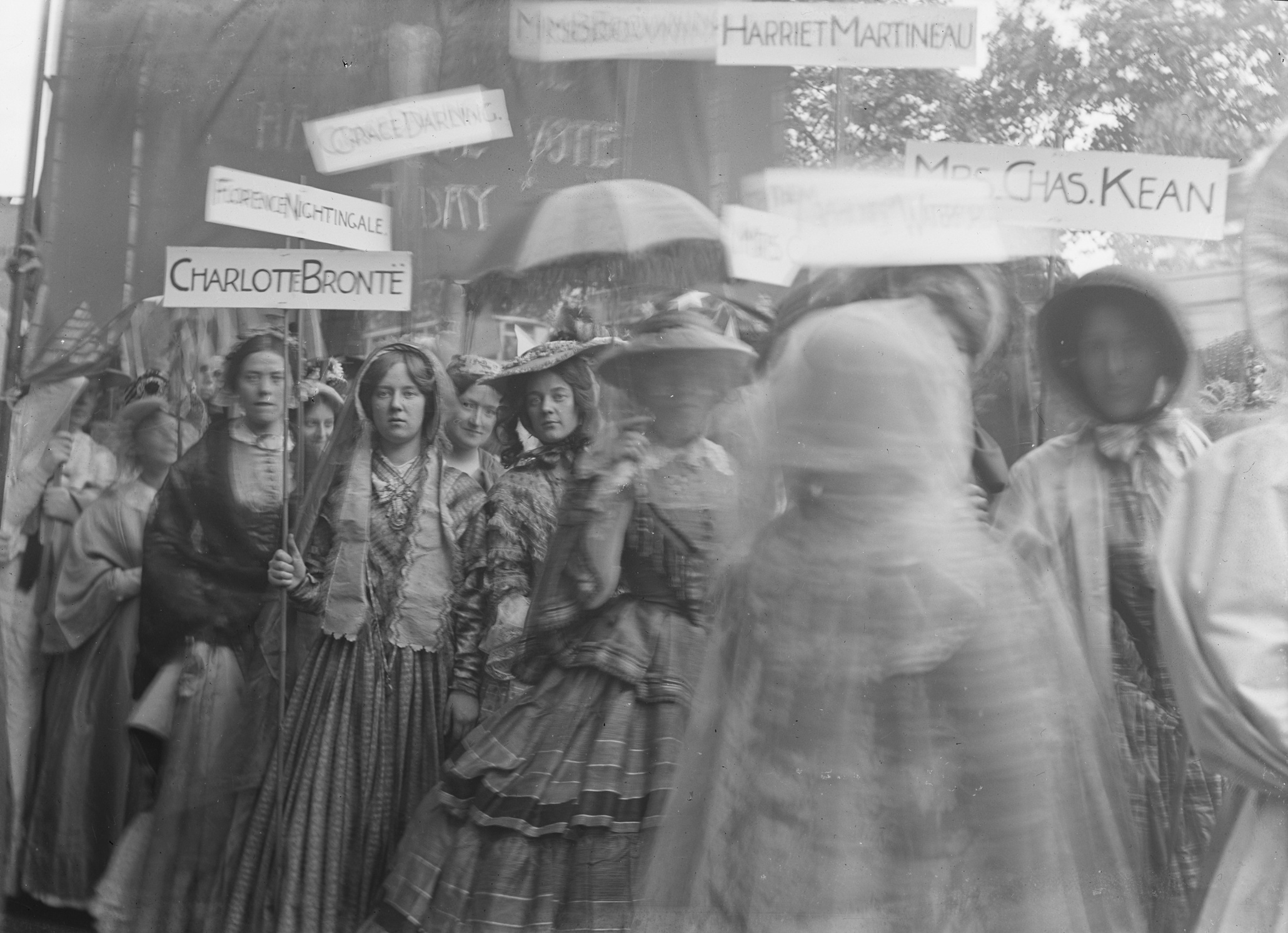
The Women's Coronation Procession, June 1911

On 17 June 1911, at the Coronation Procession, there were eighty CWSS members, many wearing religious medals or sodality ribbons, some saying the rosary as they walked, the spectators were heard to shout "Bravo, Catholics", but some also shouted for "Home Rule for Ireland".

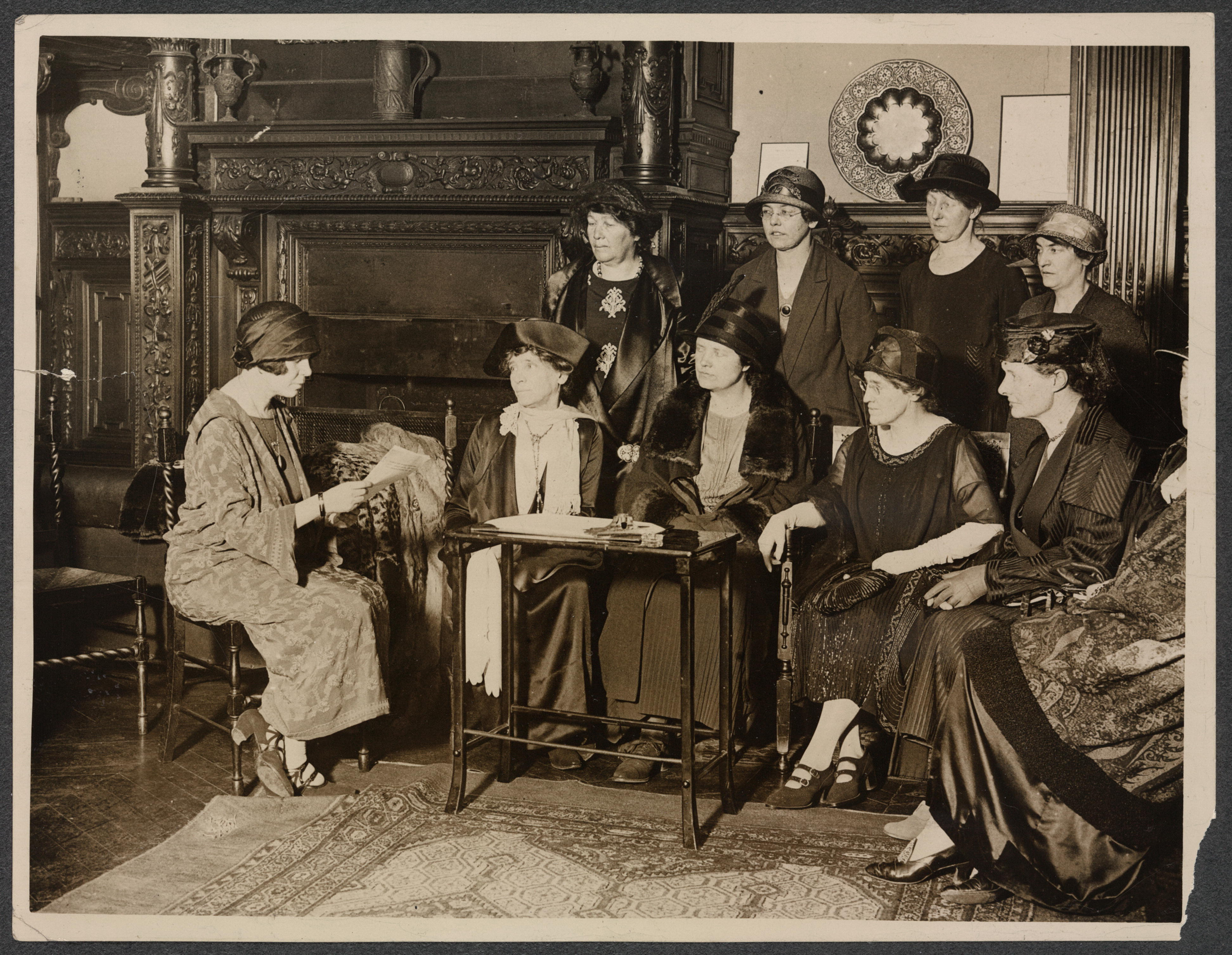
Photograph of a 1925 meeting, with Alice Paul on the left, Virginia Crawford sitting one from the right, of the British Section of an International Advisory Committee to the National Woman's Party

The CWSS organised a thanksgiving Mass when the Representation of the People Act 1918 gave some women the vote, but continued campaigning and speaking out about equal pay for equal work, and extension of the franchise to all women. Some 3% of the financial donors to CWSS were priests. However the CWSS did not get the support of the Church to be called 'Catholic' and as it joined, in 1926, the International Women Suffrage Alliance, led to a change in name to St. Joan's Social and Political Alliance, with Virginia Crawford as its first Chair, urging the organisation to demand votes for women over 21 years old, on the same grounds as men. When eventually equal franchise was achieved, the St Joan's Alliance organised a thanksgiving Mass in Westminster Cathedral and a procession including Catholic and Protestant suffragists, Millicent Fawcett and Charlotte Despard, and a two-and-a-half-year old girl representing the future. By this time Crawford was in her sixties, and went to Paris to meet with Catholic suffragists from Peru, Austria, Ukraine as well as France. The organisation also operated or had sister groups in Scotland, Ireland and Croatia. Crawford and St Joan's Alliance leaders expanded the scope of the organisation to international cooperation on women's rights.

Crawford also became head of the St. Joseph's Home for Girl Mothers, a founder of the Catholic Social Guild, and served for thirty years on the Board of Guardians as well as an elected councillor for Marylebone - for fourteen years after the First World War.

== Death and legacy ==
Crawford died in Holland Park, London on 19 October 1948. Charitable societies she founded continue internationally, and her works are reprinted to this day.
