= Kensington (electoral division) =

Electoral division in Greater London, 1973–1986

- Former electoral division for the Greater London Council
- District: Kensington and Chelsea
- Electorate: 63,306 (1973); 56,849 (1977); 51,873 (1981)
- Major settlements: Kensington
- Area: 632 hectares (6.32 km^{2})

Former electoral division
- Created: 1973
- Abolished: 1986
- Member: 1
- Created from: Kensington and Chelsea

Kensington was an electoral division for the purposes of elections to the Greater London Council. The constituency elected one councillor for a four-year term in 1973, 1977 and 1981, with the final term extended for an extra year ahead of the abolition of the Greater London Council.

== History ==
It was planned to use the same boundaries as the Westminster Parliament constituencies for election of councillors to the Greater London Council (GLC), as had been the practice for elections to the predecessor London County Council, but those that existed in 1965 crossed the Greater London boundary. Until new constituencies could be settled, the 32 London boroughs were used as electoral areas. The London Borough of Kensington and Chelsea formed the Kensington and Chelsea electoral division. This was used for the Greater London Council elections in 1964, 1967 and 1970.

The new constituencies were settled following the Second Periodic Review of Westminster constituencies and the new electoral division matched the boundaries of the Kensington parliamentary constituency.

The area was in a long-term period of population decline that was yet to reverse. The electorate reduced from 63,306 in 1973 to 51,873 in 1984. It covered an area of 632 hectares (6.32 km^{2}).

== Elections ==
The Kensington constituency was used for the Greater London Council elections in 1973, 1977 and 1981. One councillor was elected at each election using first-past-the-post voting.

=== 1973 election ===
The fourth election to the GLC (and first using revised boundaries) was held on 12 April 1973. The electorate was 68,305 and one Conservative Party councillor was elected. The turnout was 33.7%. The councillor was elected for a three-year term. This was extended for an extra year in 1976 when the electoral cycle was switched to four-yearly.

1973 Greater London Council election: Kensington
Party	Candidate	Votes	%	±%
Conservative	Robert L. Vigars	9,388	43.96	
Labour	D. J. Scott	8,736	40.92	
Liberal	K. Rason	2,855	13.38	
Communist	E. S. Adams	366	1.72	
Turnout				
Conservative win (new seat)				

=== 1977 election ===
The fifth election to the GLC (and second using revised boundaries) was held on 5 May 1977. The electorate was 56,849 and one Conservative Party councillor was elected. The turnout was 34.9%. The councillor was elected for a four-year term.

1977 Greater London Council election: Kensington
Party	Candidate	Votes	%	±%
Conservative	Robert L. Vigars	11,914	60.37	
Labour	P. A. Sweeney	5,005	25.35	
Liberal	D .M. Gorsky	1,576	7.98	
National Front	E. G. Martin	498	2.52	
Communist	E. S. Adams	349	1.77	
GLC Abolitionist Campaign	R. Fuchs	250	1.27	
English National	L. E. Green	147	0.74	
Turnout				
Conservative hold		Swing		

=== 1981 election ===
The sixth and final election to the GLC (and third using revised boundaries) was held on 7 May 1981. The electorate was 51,873 and one Conservative Party councillor was elected. The turnout was 39.2%. The councillor was elected for a four-year term, extended by an extra year by the Local Government (Interim Provisions) Act 1984, ahead of the abolition of the council.

1981 Greater London Council election: Kensington
Party	Candidate	Votes	%	±%
Conservative	Robert L. Vigars	9,579	47.37	
Labour	Stephen P. Hoier	7,317	36.16	
Liberal	Ernest R. Tudway	1,907	9.43	
Council for Social Democracy	Len Green	650	3.21	
Ecology	Roger E. Shorter	427	2.11	
Communist	Edward S. Adams	161	0.80	
Workers Revolutionary	Lesley E. Gould	101	0.50	
Save London Action Group	Maureen V. M. Cornwall	97	0.48	
Turnout				
Conservative hold		Swing		
