= Sir Charles Dilke, 2nd Baronet =

British politician (1843–1911)

The Right Honourable Sir Charles Wentworth Dilke Bt, PC
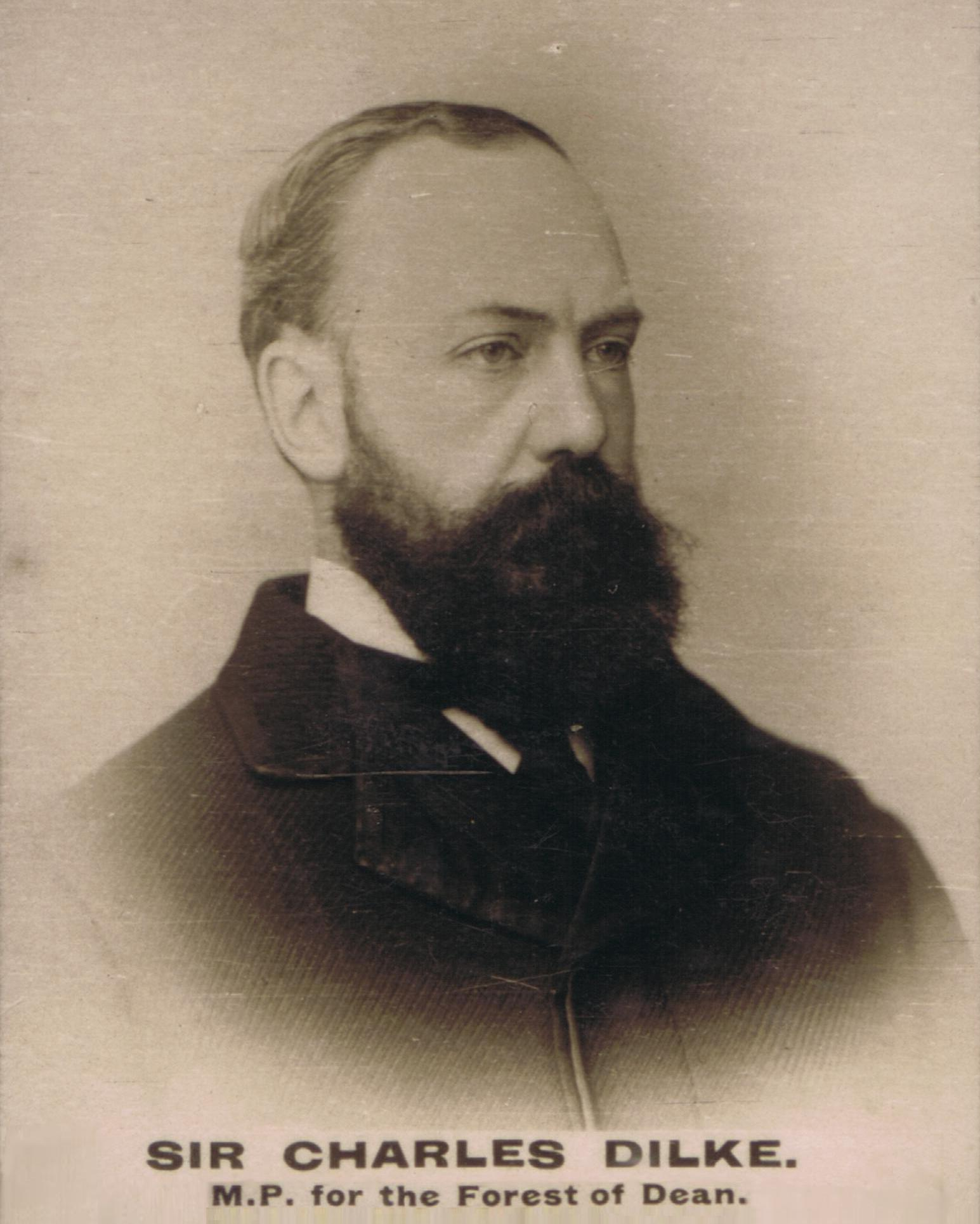
- Image from an Ogden's Cigarette Card

2nd Baronet, PC

President of the Local Government Board
- In office 1882–1885
- Preceded by: William Patrick Adam
- Succeeded by: George Shaw Lefevre

Member of Parliament for Forest of Dean
- In office 1892–1911
- Preceded by: Godfrey Blundell Samuelson
- Succeeded by: Godfrey Blundell Samuelson

Member of Parliament for Forest of Dean
- In office 1885–1886
- Preceded by: New constituency
- Succeeded by: Godfrey Blundell Samuelson

Member of Parliament for Burnley
- In office 1880–1885
- Preceded by: Robert Jones
- Succeeded by: Peter Rylands

Member of Parliament for Chelsea
- In office 1868–1874
- Preceded by: Charles Shadwell
- Succeeded by: James Stuart

Personal details
- Born: Charles Wentworth Dilke; 4 September 1843 Chelsea, London, England
- Died: 26 January 1911 (aged 67) Chelsea, London, England
- Resting place: Kensal Green Cemetery, London
- Party: Liberal
- Spouse(s): Katherine Mary Eliza Sheil (1842–1874); Emilia Strong (1884–1904)
- Education: Trinity Hall, Cambridge
- Occupation: Politician, writer

Sir Charles Wentworth Dilke, 2nd Baronet PC (4 September 1843 – 26 January 1911) was a British Liberal and Radical politician and writer.

A prominent figure in late Victorian radical politics, he was an early supporter of republicanism and later a leading critic of Whig dominance within the Liberal Party in the United Kingdom. Dilke played an important role in the reform legislation of 1883–1885, supported organised labour and women's rights, and was widely read for his writings on international affairs.

Considered a likely future prime minister, his political career was effectively ended in 1885 by a highly publicised divorce scandal. Although he later returned to Parliament, his prospects for high office never recovered, and his downfall—along with Joseph Chamberlain’s break with Liberal radicalism—significantly weakened the Radical movement.

== Background and education ==
Dilke was the son of Sir Charles Dilke, 1st Baronet. Born in Chelsea in 1843, he was educated at Trinity Hall, Cambridge, where he was President of the Cambridge Union Society. His second wife was the author, art historian, feminist and trade unionist Emily Francis Pattison, née Strong (widow of Rev. Mark Pattison), subsequently known as Lady Dilke.

Despite being a radical, Dilke was also an imperialist, and argued for British imperial domination in his bestselling 1868 book, Greater Britain.

== Political career, 1868–1886 ==
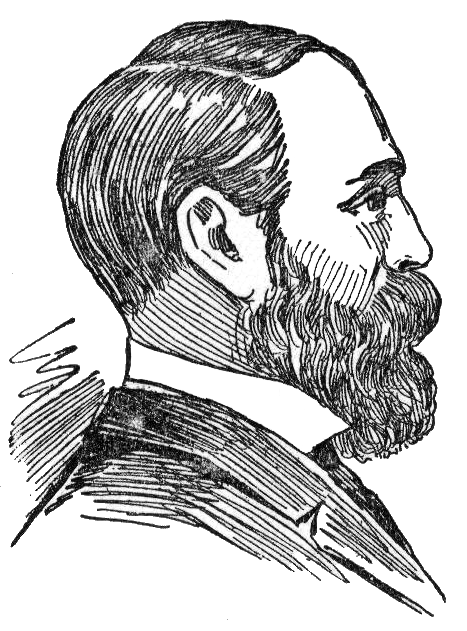
Sir Charles Dilke.

Dilke became Liberal Member of Parliament for Chelsea in 1868, a seat he held until 1886.

In 1871, Dilke caused controversy when he criticised the British monarchy and argued that the United Kingdom should adopt a republican form of government. Following public criticism, he recanted.

From 1880 to 1882, during William E. Gladstone's second government, he was Under-Secretary of State for Foreign Affairs, and was admitted to the Privy Council in 1882. In December of that year, he entered the cabinet as President of the Local Government Board, serving until 1885. A leading and determined radical within the party, he negotiated the passage of the Third Reform Act, which the Conservatives allowed through the House of Lords in return for a redistribution that they calculated to be marginally favourable to themselves. While the granting of the vote to agricultural labourers threatened the Conservative dominance of rural seats, many dual-member constituencies were abolished, with extra being created in suburbia, where Conservative support was growing. He also supported laws giving the municipal franchise to women, legalising trade unions, improving working conditions and limiting working hours, as well as being one of the earliest campaigners for universal schooling.

== Crawford scandal ==
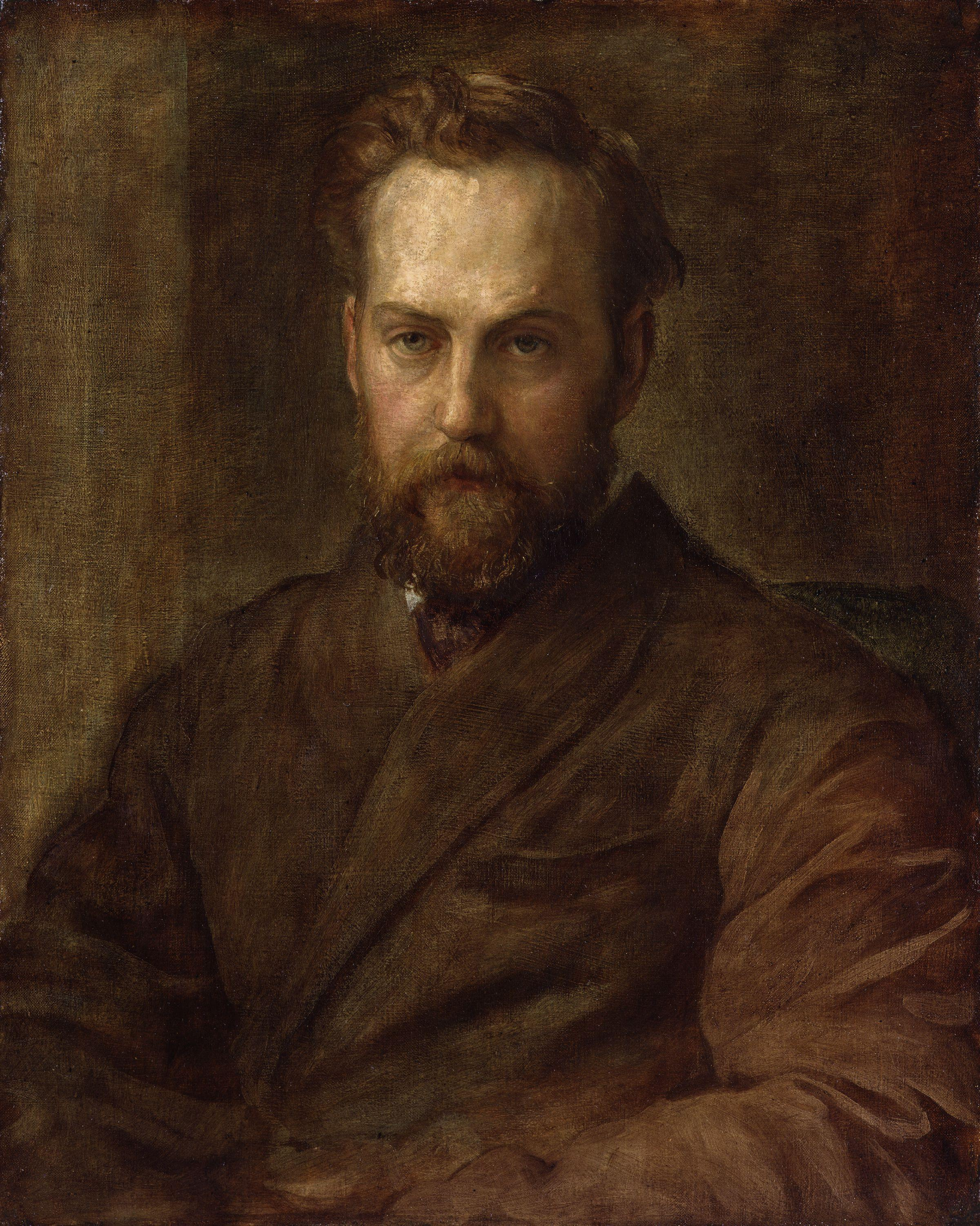
Sir Charles Wentworth Dilke, 2nd Baronet, by George Frederic Watts

Dilke's younger brother, Ashton Wentworth Dilke, married Margaret "Maye" Eustace Smith, the eldest daughter of Liberal politician and shipowner Thomas Eustace Smith and his wife, Ellen, in 1876.

Charles Dilke was said to have become the lover of Ellen Smith, his brother's mother-in-law, a relationship which continued after his marriage in 1884.

In July 1885, Charles Dilke was accused of seducing Thomas Eustace Smith's daughter Virginia Crawford (née Smith), his brother's sister-in-law and his actual lover's daughter, in the first year of her marriage to Donald Crawford, another MP. That was supposed to have occurred in 1882, when Virginia was 19, and she claimed that the affair had continued on an irregular basis for the next two and a half years.

Crawford sued for divorce, and the case was heard on 12 February 1886 before The Hon. Mr Justice Butt in the Probate, Divorce and Admiralty Division. Virginia Crawford was not in court, and the sole evidence was her husband's account of Virginia's confession. There were also some accounts by servants, which were both circumstantial and insubstantial. Dilke, aware of his vulnerability over the affair with Virginia's mother, refused to give evidence, largely on the advice of his confidant, Joseph Chamberlain. Paradoxically, Butt found that Virginia had been guilty of adultery with Dilke but that there was no admissible evidence to show that Dilke had been guilty of adultery with Virginia. He concluded, "I cannot see any case whatsoever against Sir Charles Dilke", dismissed Dilke from the suit with costs, and pronounced a decree nisi dissolving the Crawfords' marriage.

The paradoxical finding left doubts hanging over Dilke's respectability, and investigative journalist William Thomas Stead launched a public campaign against him. Two months later, in April, Dilke sought to reopen the case and clear his name by making the Queen's Proctor a party to the case and opposing the decree absolute. Unfortunately, Dilke and his legal team had badly miscalculated, his legal advice being described as "perhaps the worst professional advice ever given". Though they had planned to subject Virginia to a searching cross-examination, Dilke, having been dismissed from the case, had no locus standi. As a consequence, it was Dilke who was subjected to severe scrutiny in the witness box by Henry Matthews. Matthews' attack was devastating, and Dilke proved an unconvincing witness. His habit of cutting pieces out of his diary with scissors was held up to particular ridicule, as it created the impression that he had cut out evidence of potentially embarrassing appointments. The jury found that Virginia had presented the true version of the facts and that the decree absolute should be granted.

Dilke was ruined. Other women claimed he had approached them for a liaison. Various lurid rumours circulated about his love life, including that he had enjoyed a threesome with a maidservant and his lover in bed and that he had introduced one or more of them to "every kind of French vice". Dilke became a figure of fun in bawdy music hall songs. For a time it seemed that he would be tried for perjury. The accusations had a devastating effect on his political career, leading eventually to the loss of his parliamentary seat in the 1886 UK general election.

Matthews gained public acclaim, winning the seat of Birmingham East as a Conservative at the same election. Queen Victoria, who approved of his performance in the trial, demanded his inclusion in Lord Salisbury's cabinet and he was made Home Secretary. The Queen also asked in vain for Dilke to be stripped of his membership of the Privy Council.

Dilke spent much of the remainder of his life and much of his fortune trying to exonerate himself, which adds weight to the view that Virginia lied about the identity of her lover. Over the years, it has been suggested that his political colleagues, including Archibald Primrose, 5th Earl of Rosebery and Chamberlain, may have inspired her to accuse him, seeing him as an obstacle to their own ambitions. Dilke was largely exonerated by an inquiry in the early 1890s, which cast doubt on the truthfulness of Virginia's evidence. Her description of their alleged love nest in Warren Street was full of inaccuracies and it has been speculated that she may have been attempting to distract attention from an earlier affair with one Captain Forster.

== Political career after 1886 and death ==
Sir Charles Dilke c. 1895

In 1889, Dilke was approached by the Forest of Dean Liberal Association to stand as its parliamentary candidate, because his radical credentials suited the mining constituency seeking employment law reform. Hoping that he could be rehabilitated as a front-line politician, Dilke consulted Liberal leader Gladstone, who discouraged him, so Dilke did not pursue the offer. Three years later, however, Dilke accepted the invitation, against Gladstone's wishes and, at the 1892 general election, was duly elected as the MP for the Forest of Dean, which he held for the remainder of his life.

He hoped to be appointed Secretary of State for War in the Liberal Government formed in 1905, but it was not to be. Dilke attributed his exclusion to the incoming Prime Minister Henry Campbell-Bannerman's lingering resentment towards Dilke for his role in the 1895 "cordite vote", which had brought about the end of Lord Rosebery's administration.

Dilke was a shareholder in the 1906–7 Parkside development at 42 Knightsbridge.

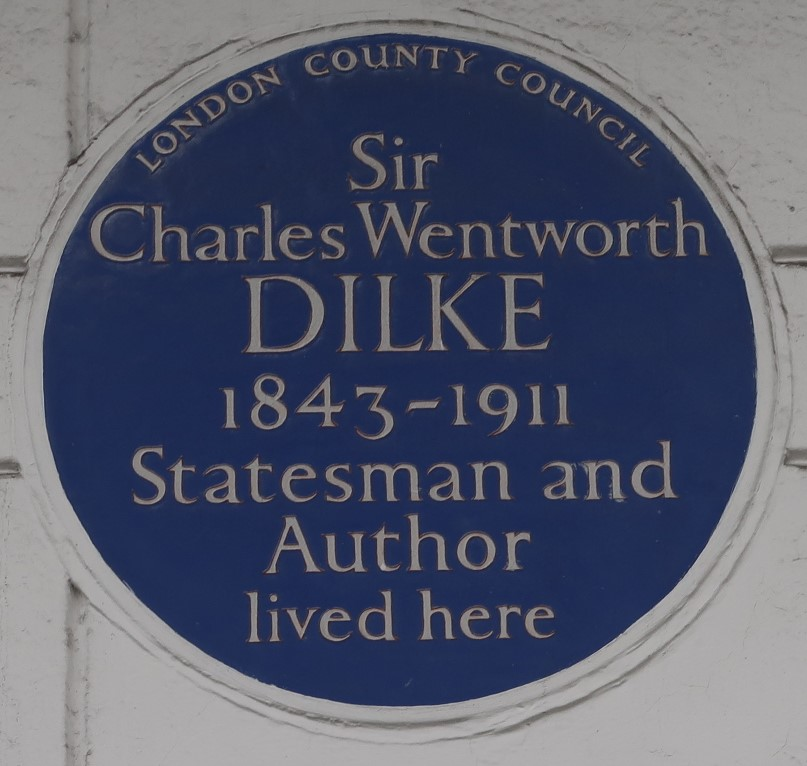
Sir Charles Wentworth Dilke 1843 - 1911 Statesman and Author (Blue plaque at 76 Sloane Street, Chelsea)

Dilke died in 1911 at 76 Sloane Street, Chelsea, the same house in which he was born. He was cremated at Golders Green Crematorium and his ashes buried at Kensal Green Cemetery.

== In popular culture ==
Following his death in 1911, fundraising commenced to establish a local community hospital in his Forest of Dean constituency. The Dilke Memorial Hospital, Cinderford, was built in 1922 and still exists as a permanent memorial to the popular MP.

Interest in Dilke was revived by Dilke: A Victorian tragedy a 1958 non-fiction work by the Labour Party politician Roy Jenkins. A 1964 West End play The Right Honourable Gentleman, by Michael Dyne, covers the scandal that brought Dilke down.

Dilke is portrayed by Richard Leech in an episode of the 1975 ATV series Edward the Seventh.

The intrigues involving Sir Charles Dilke were depicted in the three-part ITV drama The Member For Chelsea written by Ken Taylor and made by Granada Television with Richard Johnson as Sir Charles. It was broadcast over three consecutive days, 24–26 August 1981. The narrative centred primarily on the activities of the three Smith sisters Virginia, Maye and Helen. In the drama the supposed affair Sir Charles has with Virginia, which brings about his political downfall, is an invention of hers to deflect her husband's suspicions away from her real lover.

In the 1994 film Sirens, detailing sexual licence in Australia in the 1930s, the local pub is called the "Sir Charles Dilke".

== Arms ==
Coat of arms of Sir Charles Dilke, 2nd Baronet
Crest A dove Proper. Escutcheon Gules a lion rampant per pale Argent and Or. Motto Leo Inimicis Amicis Columba (The lion for my enemies, the dove for my friends); Love And Honour

== Sources ==
- Chamberlain, M. E. "Sir Charles Dilke and the British Intervention In Egypt, 1882: decision making In a nineteenth-century cabinet." British Journal of International Studies 2#3 (1976): 231–245.
- Gwynn, S.; Tuckwell, G. (1917). The life of the Rt. Hon. Sir Charles W. Dilke. London: John Murray.; A denial of the scandal prepared by his niece
- Jenkins, R (1996). Dilke: A Victorian tragedy. London: Papermac. ISBN 0-333-62020-8.; Emphasis on the scandal
- Nicholls, David (1995). The Lost Prime Minister: Life of Sir Charles Dilke. London: Hambledon Continuum. ISBN 1-852-85125-2.
- — "Dilke, Sir Charles Wentworth, second baronet (1843–1911)". Oxford Dictionary of National Biography (online ed.). Oxford University Press. 2004. doi:10.1093/ref:odnb/32824. (Subscription, Wikipedia Library access or UK public library membership required.)
- "Dilke, Charles Wentworth (DLK862CW)". A Cambridge Alumni Database. University of Cambridge.

=== Primary sources ===
- Dilke, Charles Wentworth. (1868). Greater Britain. Macmillan (reissued by Cambridge University Press, 2009; ISBN 978-1-108-00301-8)

Parliament of the United Kingdom
New constituency	Member of Parliament for Chelsea; 1868–1886; With: Sir Henry Hoare, Bt 1868–1874; William Gordon 1874–1880; Joseph Bottomley Firth 1880–1885	Succeeded by Charles Algernon Whitmore
Preceded by Godfrey Samuelson	Member of Parliament for Forest of Dean; 1892–1911	Succeeded by Henry Webb
Political offices
Preceded by Robert Bourke	Under-Secretary of State for Foreign Affairs; 1880–1882	Succeeded by Lord Edmond FitzMaurice
Preceded by John George Dodson	President of the Local Government Board; 1882–1885	Succeeded by Arthur Balfour
Baronetage of the United Kingdom
Preceded by Wentworth Dilke	Baronet (of Sloane Street); 1869–1911	Succeeded by Charles Dilke
