= Percy Rugg =

British politician

Sir Edward Percy Rugg (14 January 1906 – 7 September 1986) was a British politician, who served as the last leader of the Conservative Party on London County Council, and the party's first leader on the Greater London Council.

Rugg was educated at the Leys School in Cambridge. He qualified as a solicitor in 1929, and in 1940 was elected to Hertfordshire County Council. Although he was not re-elected in 1945, he remained politically active, chairing the Hertford Conservative Association from 1948, and winning election to Ware Rural District Council in 1949, serving as its chair until 1954.

Rugg subsequently refocused his attention on London, and was appointed to London County Council as an alderman in 1958. The following year, he was chosen as leader of the Conservative Party group on the council, and thereby became the leader of the opposition. He switched to become a councillor in 1961, representing Chelsea. In 1964, the council was abolished, but Rugg was elected to its replacement, the Greater London Council, representing Kensington and Chelsea, and he continued as leader of the opposition until 1966.

Rugg stood down from the council in 1970, but remained active in the East Hertfordshire and Chelsea Conservative Associations into the 1980s, when he moved to Sandwich in Kent. He was knighted in 1959, and remained an active solicitor throughout his political career.

Party political offices
Preceded by Geoffrey Rippon	Leader of the Conservative Party on London County Council; 1959–1964	Succeeded by Council abolished
Preceded by New position	Leader of the Conservative Party on the Greater London Council; 1965–1966	Succeeded by Desmond Plummer
Civic offices
Preceded by Herbert Ferguson	Chairman of the Greater London Council; 1967–1968	Succeeded by Louis Gluckstein
