= Allan Noble =

British politician (1908-1982)

Commander The Right Honourable Sir Allan Noble KCMG DSO DSC DL
- Born: Allan Herbert Percy Noble; 2 May 1908
- Died: 17 November 1982 (aged 74)
- Occupations: politician, and diplomat

Sir Allan Herbert Percy Noble KCMG DSO DSC PC DL (2 May 1908 – 17 November 1982) was an English naval commander, politician, and diplomat.

== Career ==
Noble was the elder son of Admiral Sir Percy Noble. He joined the Royal Navy in 1926 and was a destroyer commander during World War II, earning a DSO and a DSC. He retired from the Navy in 1946 and entered Parliament as a Conservative Member of Parliament for Chelsea. He was Parliamentary Private Secretary to Anthony Eden from 1947 to 1951. His next appointments included Parliamentary and Financial Secretary to the Admiralty from 1951 to 1955, Parliamentary Under-Secretary of State for Commonwealth Relations from 1955 to 1956 and Minister of State for Foreign Affairs from 1956 to 1959. He was appointed a Privy Counsellor in 1956. In 1961 he became Special Ambassador to the Ivory Coast. He died on 17 November 1982 at the age of 74.

== Sources ==
- The Noble Family Papers held at Churchill Archives Centre

Parliament of the United Kingdom
Preceded by William Sidney	Member of Parliament for Chelsea; 1945 – 1959	Succeeded by John Litchfield
