= William Gordon (Chelsea MP) =

British solicitor and politician

William Gordon (1818 – 9 June 1894) was a British solicitor and Conservative Party politician.

The youngest son of Alexander Gordon, a solicitor of Old Broad Street and Wandsworth Common and his wife Harriet née Elwyn, he was admitted as a solicitor in 1840.

At the 1874 general election Gordon was elected as one of two members of parliament for Chelsea. He served a single term and did not contest the next election in 1880.

Parliament of the United Kingdom
Preceded by Sir Charles Dilke, 2nd Baronet and Sir Henry Hoare, 5th Baronet	Member of Parliament for Chelsea; 1868 – 1874; With: Sir Charles Dilke, 2nd Baronet	Succeeded by Sir Charles Dilke, 2nd Baronet and Joseph Firth Bottomley Firth
