= Emslie Horniman =

British anthropologist, philanthropist and politician

Emslie John Horniman

Member of Parliament for Chelsea
- In office 1906–1910
- Preceded by: Charles Algernon Whitmore
- Succeeded by: Samuel Hoare

Personal details
- Born: 1863
- Died: 11 July 1932 (aged 68–69) Chelsea Embankment
- Party: Liberal
- Spouse: Laura Isabel Plomer
- Relations: Frederick John Horniman (father); Annie Horniman (sister)
- Occupation: Anthropologist, philanthropist

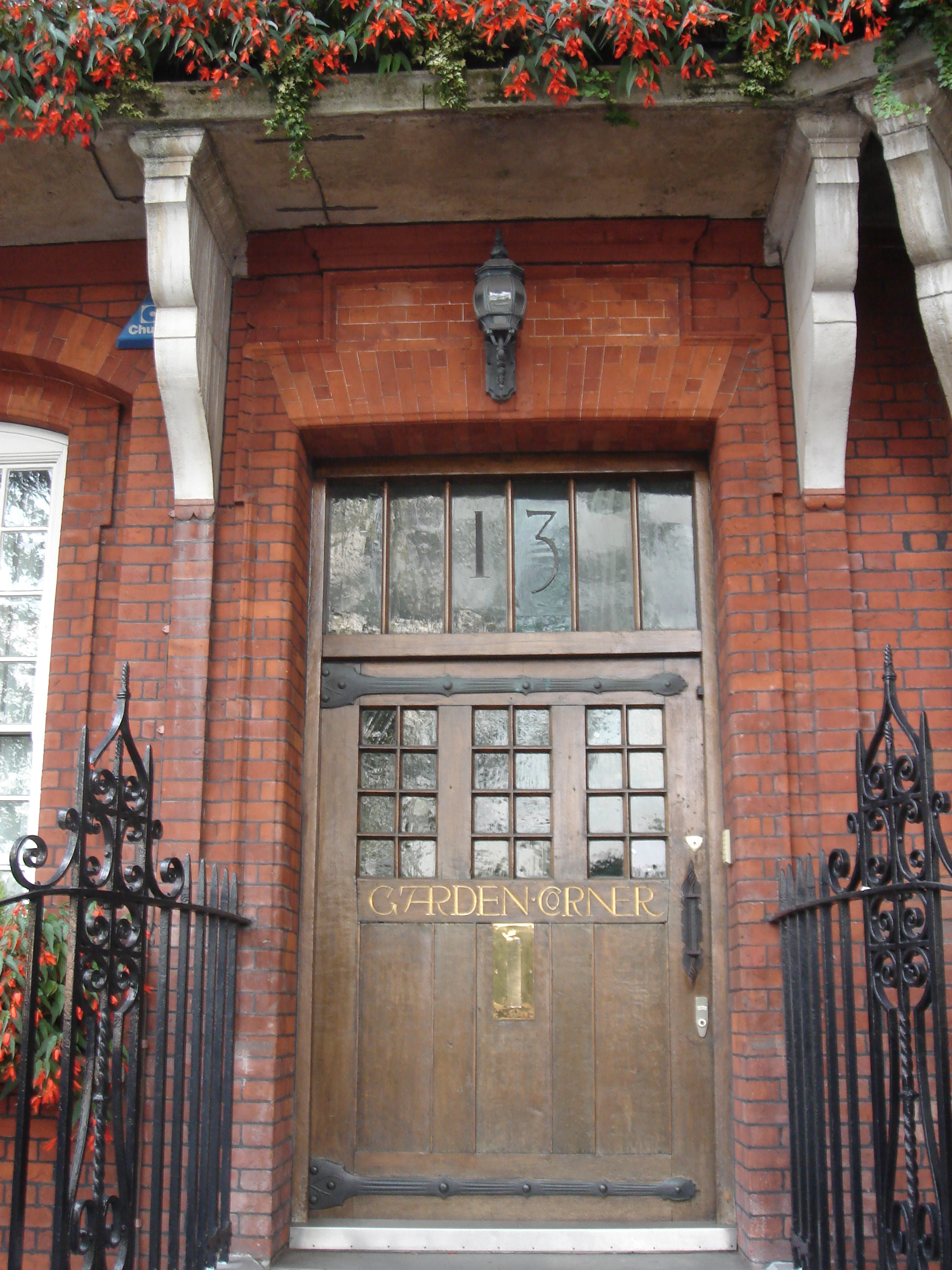
Garden Corner, Horniman's London residence

Emslie John Horniman (1863 – 11 July 1932) was a British anthropologist, philanthropist and Liberal Party politician.

The son of Frederick Horniman, sometime Liberal member of parliament for Penryn and Falmouth, Horniman was educated privately and at the Slade School of Fine Art. He spent his youth travelling widely, visiting Egypt, Morocco, Central Africa, India, Burma, the Dutch East Indies, French Indochina, China, Japan, and the United States. Like his father, the founder of the Horniman Museum, he was an enthusiastic collector of arts and "curiosities".

In 1898 he was elected to the London County Council to represent Chelsea. A member of the majority Liberal-backed Progressive Party, he was re-elected in 1901 and 1904.

At the 1906 general election Horniman was chosen to contest the parliamentary constituency of Chelsea by the Liberals. There was a large swing to the party, and he was elected, unseating the Conservative MP, Charles Whitmore. He served only one term in the Commons, losing the seat to Conservative opponent, Samuel Hoare, in January 1910.

In 1911 he laid out and donated a public park in Kensal Town (Kensal Town was an exclave of Chelsea at that time), to the London County Council, since known as Emslie Horniman's Pleasance.

Horniman inherited the Horniman's Tea company founded by his grandfather, and in 1912 purchased Burford Priory, Oxfordshire from Colonel Frank de Sales la Terrière. He sold Horniman's Tea in 1918 to rival J. Lyons & Co.

He married Laura Isabel Plomer (aunt of the writer William Plomer), and the couple had three children. He died at his London residence on Chelsea Embankment in July 1932. He left an estate of over £300,000 and a number of artworks, most of which he bequeathed to the National Art Collections Fund. £10,000 was given to the London County Council to build an extension to the Horniman Museum, based in Forest Hill. In 1944 the Royal Anthropological Institute established the Emslie Horniman Anthropological Scholarship Fund in his memory to "promote the study of the growth of civilisations, habits and customs, religious and physical characteristics of the non-European peoples and of prehistoric and non-industrial man in Europe".

Parliament of the United Kingdom
Preceded by Charles Algernon Whitmore	Member of Parliament for Chelsea; 1906–1910	Succeeded by Samuel Hoare
