= Russell-Cooke Solicitors =

Law firms of the United Kingdom

Russell-Cooke LLP
- Headquarters: Putney, United Kingdom
- No. of offices: 2 London based offices, 1 other office.
- No. of lawyers: 200 fee earners
- No. of employees: approximately 358
- Major practice areas: General practice
- Revenue: £32.6 million
- Date founded: 1880
- Founder: William Russell-Cooke & Sir Henry Paget-Cooke
- Company type: Limited liability partnership
- Website: russell-cooke.co.uk

Russell-Cooke is a UK top-100 London-based law firm. The firm advises on an unusually broad mix of commercial, not for profit, regulatory and private client issues. Since its establishment in 1880 the firm has grown in size and now has more than 200 highly regarded specialist solicitors and lawyers. The firm has a core client base of more than 12,000 and an annual turnover of £32.6 million. John Gould is the firm's senior partner and has led the firm's senior management for more than twenty years. The firm's headquarters is in Bedford Row adjacent to Gray's Inn.

== History ==
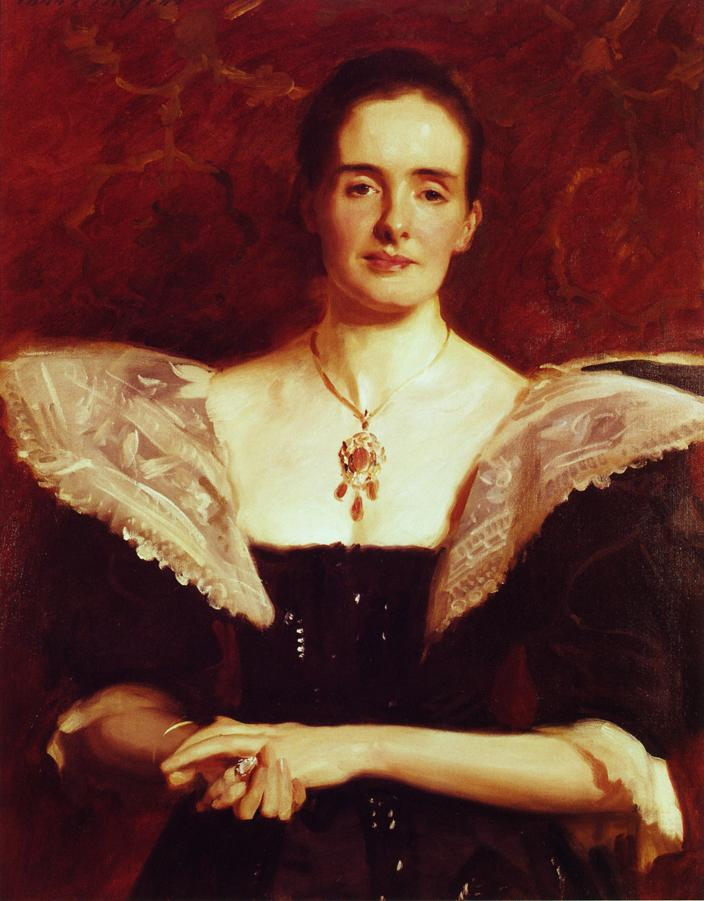
Suffragist Mrs. William Russell Cooke, John Singer Sargent, 1895

Russell-Cooke was founded in London in 1880 by William Russell Cooke and Sir Henry Paget-Cooke.

In the 1890s the firm moved into Old Square, Lincoln's Inn, where clients included the Liberal Party and members of the Royal Family.

Following the Second World War, Russell-Cooke aligned itself with Sloper, Potter & Chapman, which was based in South West London. The two firms eventually merged in 1958 to form Russell-Cooke Potter & Chapman, with Edward Chapman as senior partner.

During the 1960s and 1970s Russell-Cooke Potter and Chapman expanded, developing a large commercial property department and attracted a number of famous clients from the pop and entertainment world. Edward Chapman's son Lewin became senior partner.

A third office in Kingston-upon-Thames was opened on the Thames at Kingston Bridge. After 100 years occupying the upper two floors of 2 Putney Hill, the firm took over the ground floor from the National Westminster Bank. Further growth during the nineties saw the Central London contingent move from Old Square into Grade II listed buildings at 8 Bedford Row. Expansion in the last ten years sees the firm occupying a customised modern building of around 35,000 sq ft in Putney on a site it has occupied for more than 100 years.

The firm shortened its name to Russell-Cooke in 2001. In May 2007 the firm converted to a limited liability partnership [LLP] practice, Russell-Cooke LLP.

The firm is an all-equity partnership and has an unusually high proportion of female partners for at least the last 15 years. A majority of the firm's Board are women including the joint managing partner.

Environmental policies have included a large solar array installed in 2013 and bee hives set up in 2014. It became a "carbon negative" business in 2019. Very unusually for a large firm, it has long had a strategic target to maintain 5% of its turnover for legally aided work.

== Main Practice Areas ==
Russell-Cooke is currently recognised by The Legal 500 in 23 categories and by Chambers UK in 14 categories.

== Offices ==
Russell-Cooke's headquarters is located in Putney (SW15). It also has an office in London (Bedford Row WC1R) and another in Kingston-upon-Thames.
