= Charles Algernon Whitmore =

English politician (1851–1908)

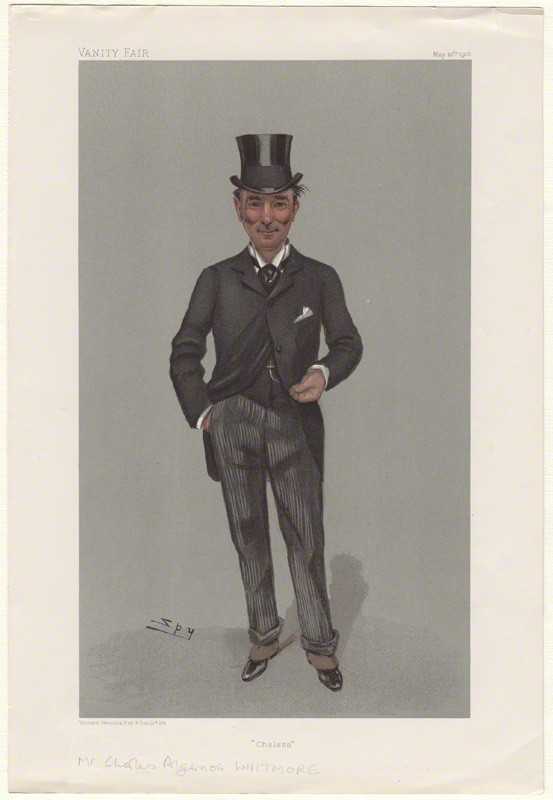
"Chelsea". Caricature by Spy published in Vanity Fair in 1901.

Charles Algernon Whitmore (24 September 1851 – 10 September 1908) was a British barrister and Conservative Party politician. He sat in the House of Commons from 1886 to 1906, as the Member of Parliament (MP) for Chelsea.

== Early life ==
Whitmore was the son of the county court judge Charles Shaplabd Whitmore QC and his wife Elizabeth Katherine, a sister of Sir Henry Brownrigg, Bt. He was educated at Eton and Balliol, and became a Fellow of All Souls in 1874, before being called to the bar in 1876 at the Inner Temple.

== Political career ==
At the 1885 general election, Whitmore unsuccessfully contested the parliamentary borough of Chelsea in London, where he lost by 175 votes (2%) to the sitting MP, the Liberal Sir Charles Dilke, Bt.

However, in early 1886 Dilke was involved in a high-profile divorce case which grew into a high-profile sex scandal, and at the next general election, in July 1886, Whitmore defeated Dilke with a majority of 176 votes. He served for a time as private secretary to the Home Secretary Henry Matthews, who as a barrister had conducted the cross-examination of Dilke, destroying the latter's career.

Whitmore served as the Second Church Estates Commissioner, and in 1895 he was elected by London County Council as an Alderman for the Moderate Party, serving until 1901. He was re-elected as MP for Chelsea at three further elections, but at the 1906 general election he was defeated by the Liberal candidate Emslie Horniman.

Parliament of the United Kingdom
Preceded by Sir Charles Dilke	Member of Parliament for Chelsea; 1886–1906	Succeeded by Emslie Horniman
Church of England titles
Preceded by Sir Henry Selwin-Ibbetson	Second Church Estates Commissioner; 1892	Succeeded by George Leveson Gower
