= John Litchfield (politician) =

British Royal Navy officer and politician

Captain John Shirley Sandys Litchfield, OBE (27 August 1903 – 31 May 1993) was a British Royal Navy officer and politician who became Conservative Member of Parliament for Chelsea. He was noted for his connections with the royal family.

== Education ==
Litchfield was the son of a rear admiral in the Royal Navy (F.S. Litchfield-Speer), and went to the Royal Naval College, Osborne, where Naval officer cadets received an education akin to a public school subsidised by the Navy. He went on from there to the Royal Naval College at Dartmouth, and later studied at the Imperial Defence College and on an exchange trip to the National War College in the United States.

== Royal connections ==
At Dartmouth, Litchfield was asked to "keep a fraternal eye" on fellow cadet Prince Charles of Belgium, and later served with him on HMS Renown when it visited the far east with the Prince of Wales. In 1922, while at the wedding of Lord Louis Mountbatten, Litchfield accidentally trod on the foot of former Prime Minister H. H. Asquith, who uttered a response that was "unparliamentary and swift". That same year, it was Mountbatten who personally informed Litchfield of his father's death.

Litchfield was appointed as "King's Midshipman" for Cowes Week of 1924, and nearly caused problems when his steamship came within inches of colliding with the Royal Yacht. He later recalled that he heard a loud cry of "Mind my paintwork, boy!" and looked round to see that King George V was glowering at him.

Later in the 1920s, Litchfield was called upon to reply to the toast "Wives and sweethearts" while on board Renown carrying the Duke and Duchess of York to Australia. He decided to end with his own toast, to the Princess Elizabeth, and ever after claimed to have been the first person to toast the health of the Queen.

== Naval advancement ==
In 1929, Litchfield was posted to the Yangtze River and obtained permission to travel via the Trans-Siberian Railway. He stopped off in Moscow to see the sights and when he photographed the Kremlin, was detained by the OGPU as a suspected spy. Litchfield was an enthusiastic photographer, both still and cine, and his footage of naval operations is valued by historians. The 1930s saw him stationed in Palestine commanding armoured cars and trains on the land, and trying to stop Arab terrorists. He was mentioned in dispatches for his work there.

== Wartime service ==
During the Second World War, Litchfield served on HMS Norfolk on the Russian Convoys and aided the Allied landings in North Africa. Later in the war he moved to headquarters, planning for D-Day; he was awarded the OBE for his work. He became deputy director of Naval Intelligence from 1949 to 1950 and commanded HMS Vanguard, the Navy's last battleship from 21 December 1951 until 18 January 1953. The ship was due to take the King and Queen to South Africa in 1952 but the King's death forced the cancellation of the trip.

== Leaving the Navy ==
Litchfield was struck down by polyneuritis that year and took six months' sick leave to recover. He ended his naval career as Director of Operations for the Admiralty in 1953–1954, and retired with the rank of captain in 1955. On leaving he had already decided to go into politics with the Conservative Party and was elected to Kent County Council in 1955, serving for a single three-year term.

== Parliament ==
Having determined to try to enter Parliament, Litchfield was disappointed at Maidstone (Margaret Thatcher was a fellow candidate). However he was selected for Chelsea for the 1959 general election (where he followed another Navy man, Allan Noble). Chelsea was a very safe seat and his selection was controversial because Litchfield was in his fifties and not likely to become a long-standing member. Nicholas Ridley was the choice of the minority, but Litchfield won many around by his sincerity. He was comfortably elected.

During the Profumo affair, Litchfield was among a small group of Conservative MPs who felt that Harold Macmillan had been mistaken in keeping Profumo in the government following his denial of any impropriety. However, Litchfield liked Profumo personally. During a parliamentary trip to NATO headquarters, Litchfield found that all the seats in the limousines were taken, and was forced to travel sitting on Harold Wilson's lap.

== Retirement ==
As suspected by the Chelsea selectorate, Litchfield would not have a long parliamentary career, retiring in 1966. He continued making films, and was pleased to loan one of his films on the Russian convoys to Captain Jack Broome who used it to win a libel action against author David Irving. He was also a raconteur who used his store of stories of his naval career to entertain audiences.

== Footnotes ==
Parliament of the United Kingdom
Preceded by Allan Noble	Member of Parliament for Chelsea; 1959–1966	Succeeded by Marcus Worsley
