= Chelsea (UK Parliament constituency) =

Parliamentary constituency in the United Kingdom, 1885–1997

- Former borough constituency for the House of Commons
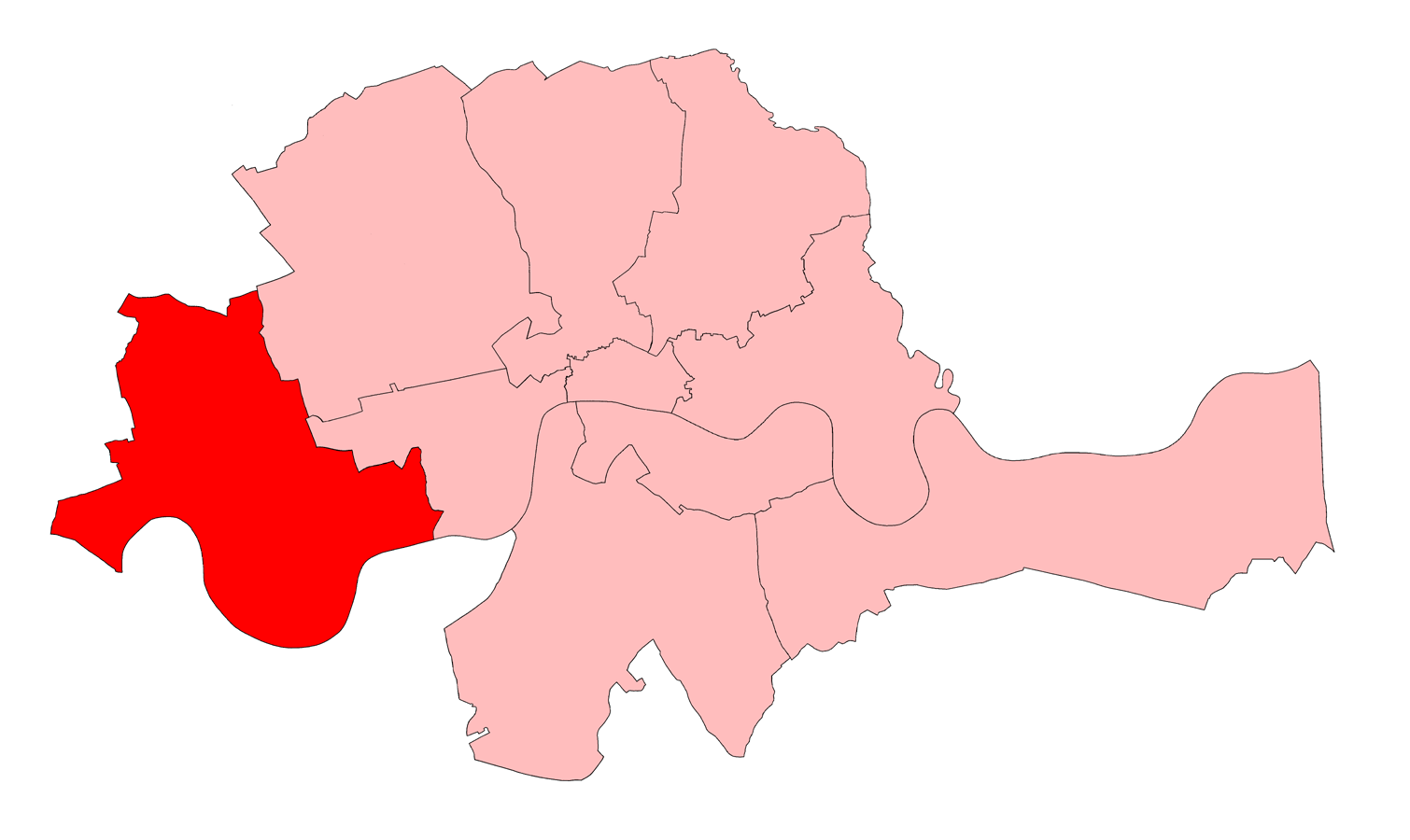
- Chelsea 1868–1885

1868–1997
- Seats: Two (1868–1885): One (1885–1997)
- Created from: Middlesex
- Replaced by: Kensington and Chelsea

Chelsea was a borough constituency, represented in the House of Commons of the Parliament of the United Kingdom.

The constituency was created by the Reform Act 1867 for the 1868 general election, when it returned two Members of Parliament (MPs), elected by the bloc vote system of election.

Under the Redistribution of Seats Act 1885, with effect from the 1885 general election, its representation was reduced to one MP, elected by the first past the post system.

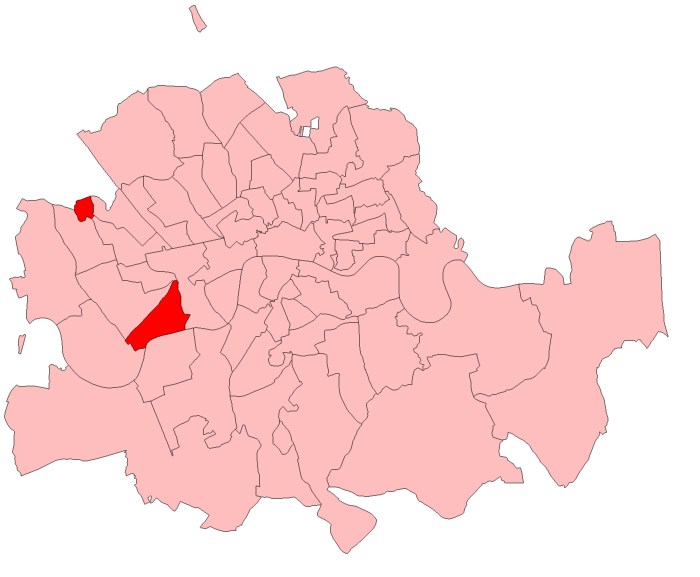
Chelsea in London 1885–1918. The constituency had two detached parts: one in what is currently known as Chelsea and a separate part in Kensal Town

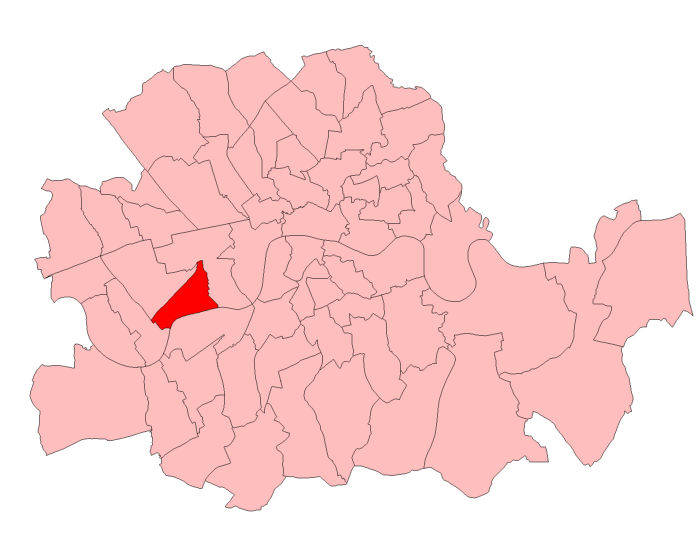
Chelsea in London 1918–1950

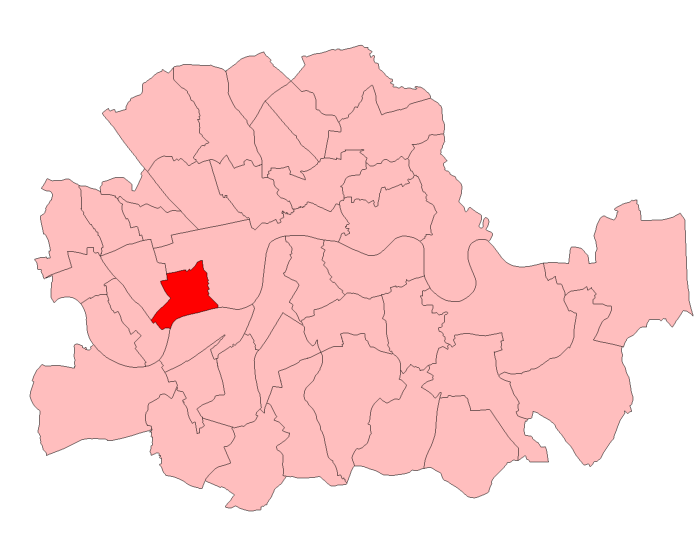
Chelsea in London 1950–1983

== Boundaries and boundary changes ==
1868–1885: The parishes of Chelsea, Fulham, Hammersmith, and Kensington.

1885–1918: The parish of St Luke, Chelsea.

Chelsea (after the local government changes in 1965) is a district of Inner London, comprising for administrative purposes the southern part of the Royal Borough of Kensington and Chelsea. Its southern boundary is on the north bank of the River Thames. It adjoins Westminster to the east, Fulham to the west and Kensington to the north.

Before 1868 the area was represented in Parliament as part of the county constituency of Middlesex.

With the expansion westwards of the urban area around Westminster, the former village of Chelsea and neighbouring areas had by 1868 developed enough to be made a Parliamentary borough and given two seats in the House of Commons. The parliamentary borough comprised four civil parishes: Chelsea, Fulham, Hammersmith and Kensington.

In 1885, the existing parliamentary borough was divided into five single-member constituencies. The Redistribution of Seats Act 1885 defined the redrawn Chelsea seat as comprising the parish of St Luke, Chelsea. The constituency had a detached outlier, the Kensal Green area, because of its history as a detached part of St Luke parish. (The remaining parishes became the constituencies of Fulham, Hammersmith, Kensington North and Kensington South.)

In 1889, the historic county of Middlesex was divided for administrative purposes. Chelsea became part of the County of London. No changes were made to parliamentary boundaries, however.

In the 1918 redistribution of Parliamentary seats, the Metropolitan Borough of Chelsea (created as a local government unit in 1900) was represented by one MP.

In the redistribution which took effect in 1950, the then Brompton ward of the Metropolitan Borough of Kensington was added to the existing area of the constituency.

In 1965, the London County Council area was absorbed by the new Greater London Council. The constituency was included in a new London Borough of Kensington and Chelsea, although the Parliamentary boundaries were not altered immediately.

In the redistribution that took effect in 1974, the Kensington and Chelsea, Chelsea constituency consisted of the then Brompton, Cheyne, Church, Earls Court, Hans Town, North Stanley, Redcliffe, Royal Hospital and South Stanley wards of Kensington and Chelsea.

The constituency shared boundaries with the Chelsea electoral division for election of councillors to the Greater London Council at elections in 1973, 1977 and 1981.

From the 1983 redistribution, Chelsea consisted of Abingdon, Brompton, Cheyne, Church, Courtfield, Earls Court, Hans Town, North Stanley, Redcliffe, Royal Hospital and South Stanley wards of Kensington and Chelsea.

98.5% of the constituency had been in the pre-1983 Chelsea and 1.5% had been part of Kensington.

In the 1997 redistribution, Chelsea ceased to exist as a constituency. The area was included in the Kensington and Chelsea constituency, which covered the central and southern portions of the Royal Borough of Kensington and Chelsea, including the centres of both Kensington and Chelsea.

The constituency had the highest concentration of those born in the European Community (5.4% of the population) and those born in the Old Commonwealth (3.3% of the population) in 1981.

== Members of Parliament ==
=== MPs 1868–1885 ===
| Election | First member | First party | Second member | Second party |
|---|---|---|---|---|
| 1868 | Sir Charles Dilke, Bt. | Liberal | Sir Henry Hoare, Bt | Liberal |
| 1874 | Sir Charles Dilke, Bt. | Liberal | William Gordon | Conservative |
| 1880 | Sir Charles Dilke, Bt. | Liberal | Joseph Bottomley Firth | Liberal |
| 1885 | Redistribution of Seats Act: representation reduced to one member | | | |

=== MPs 1885–1997 ===
| Election | Member | Party |
|---|---|---|
| 1885 | Sir Charles Dilke, Bt. | Liberal |
| 1886 | Charles Algernon Whitmore | Conservative |
| 1906 | Emslie Horniman | Liberal |
| Jan 1910 | Samuel Hoare | Conservative |
| 1918 | Samuel Hoare | Coalition Conservative |
| 1922 | Samuel Hoare | Conservative |
| 1944 by-election | William Sidney | Conservative |
| 1945 | Allan Noble | Conservative |
| 1959 | John Litchfield | Conservative |
| 1966 | Sir Marcus Worsley | Conservative |
| Oct 1974 | Sir Nicholas Scott | Conservative |
| 1997 | constituency abolished: see Kensington & Chelsea | |

== Elections ==
=== Elections in the 1990s ===
- Constituency abolished 1997

General election 1992: Chelsea
| Party | Candidate | Votes | % | ±% |
|---|---|---|---|---|
| Conservative | Nicholas Scott | 17,471 | 65.1 | +0.5 |
| Labour | Rima Horton | 4,682 | 17.5 | +2.1 |
| Liberal Democrats | Susan N. Broidy | 4,101 | 15.3 | −2.6 |
| Green | Niki Kortvelyessy | 485 | 1.8 | −0.3 |
| Anti-Federalist League | Douglas Armstrong | 88 | 0.3 | New |
| Majority | | 12,789 | 47.6 | +0.9 |
| Turnout | | 26,827 | 63.3 | +5.6 |
| Conservative hold | | Swing | | |

=== Elections in the 1980s ===
General election 1987: Chelsea
| Party | Candidate | Votes | % | ±% |
|---|---|---|---|---|
| Conservative | Nicholas Scott | 18,443 | 64.6 | +1.4 |
| Liberal | Jennifer Ware | 5,124 | 17.9 | −5.6 |
| Labour | David Ward | 4,406 | 15.4 | +2.6 |
| Green | Niki Kortvelyessy | 587 | 2.1 | New |
| Majority | | 13,319 | 46.7 | +7.0 |
| Turnout | | 28,560 | 57.7 | +1.6 |
| Conservative hold | | Swing | | |

General election 1983: Chelsea
| Party | Candidate | Votes | % | ±% |
|---|---|---|---|---|
| Conservative | Nicholas Scott | 19,122 | 63.2 | −2.9 |
| Liberal | Jonathan Fryer | 7,101 | 23.5 | +9.7 |
| Labour | Nick Palmer | 3,876 | 12.8 | −5.7 |
| Independent | Amanda Feilding | 139 | 0.5 | +0.3 |
| Majority | | 12,021 | 39.7 | −7.7 |
| Turnout | | 30,238 | 56.1 | −1.2 |
| Conservative hold | | Swing | | |

- Minor boundary change affecting less than 5% of electors

=== Elections in the 1970s ===
General election 1979: Kensington and Chelsea, Chelsea
| Party | Candidate | Votes | % | ±% |
|---|---|---|---|---|
| Conservative | Nicholas Scott | 21,782 | 66.1 | +5.1 |
| Labour | R. M. Pandy | 6,092 | 18.5 | −1.7 |
| Liberal | Peter Driver | 4,544 | 13.8 | −4.1 |
| National Front | A. Reeve | 342 | 1.0 | New |
| Independent | B. Fellowes | 146 | 0.4 | N/A |
| Independent | Amanda Feilding | 49 | 0.2 | N/A |
| Majority | | 15,690 | 47.6 | +6.8 |
| Turnout | | 57,515 | 57.3 | +7.3 |
| Conservative hold | | Swing | +3.4 | |

General election October 1974: Kensington and Chelsea, Chelsea
| Party | Candidate | Votes | % | ±% |
|---|---|---|---|---|
| Conservative | Nicholas Scott | 19,674 | 61.0 | +0.6 |
| Labour | G. A. Colerick | 6,507 | 20.2 | +2.5 |
| Liberal | N. L. Clarke | 5,758 | 17.9 | −2.9 |
| Independent | R. E. Byron | 321 | 1.0 | New |
| Majority | | 13,167 | 40.8 | +1.1 |
| Turnout | | 64,548 | 50.0 | −10.0 |
| Conservative hold | | Swing | | |

General election February 1974: Kensington and Chelsea, Chelsea
| Party | Candidate | Votes | % | ±% |
|---|---|---|---|---|
| Conservative | Marcus Worsley | 23,320 | 60.4 | −5.0 |
| Liberal | N. L. Clarke | 8,012 | 20.8 | +12.0 |
| Labour | S. K. Ward | 6,839 | 17.7 | −6.0 |
| Ind. Conservative | A. J. E. Barclay | 416 | 1.1 | New |
| Majority | | 15,308 | 39.7 | −2.0 |
| Turnout | | 64,338 | 60.0 | +5.0 |
| Conservative hold | | Swing | | |

General election 1970: Chelsea
| Party | Candidate | Votes | % | ±% |
|---|---|---|---|---|
| Conservative | Marcus Worsley | 15,852 | 65.4 | +5.5 |
| Labour | Richard John Madeley | 5,737 | 23.7 | −4.4 |
| Liberal | Anthony Hugh Shirley Beavan | 2,136 | 8.8 | −3.2 |
| Independent | Nicholas Luard | 514 | 2.1 | New |
| Majority | | 10,115 | 41.7 | +9.9 |
| Turnout | | 44,038 | 55.0 | −8.0 |
| Conservative hold | | Swing | +5.0 | |

- Boundary change

=== Elections in the 1960s ===
General election 1966: Chelsea
| Party | Candidate | Votes | % | ±% |
|---|---|---|---|---|
| Conservative | Marcus Worsley | 16,337 | 59.9 | −1.6 |
| Labour | Roderick N. Tyler | 7,674 | 28.1 | +2.9 |
| Liberal | Paul Smith | 3,285 | 12.0 | −1.3 |
| Majority | | 8,663 | 31.8 | −4.5 |
| Turnout | | 43,336 | 63.0 | +0.2 |
| Conservative hold | | Swing | -2.3 | |

General election 1964: Chelsea
| Party | Candidate | Votes | % | ±% |
|---|---|---|---|---|
| Conservative | John Litchfield | 16,802 | 61.5 | −6.3 |
| Labour | James Dickens | 6,868 | 25.2 | +4.8 |
| Liberal | Anthony Clive S. Thomas | 3,635 | 13.3 | +1.5 |
| Majority | | 9,934 | 36.3 | −10.9 |
| Turnout | | 43,515 | 62.8 | −3.0 |
| Conservative hold | | Swing | -5.5 | |

=== Elections in the 1950s ===
General election 1959: Chelsea
| Party | Candidate | Votes | % | ±% |
|---|---|---|---|---|
| Conservative | John Litchfield | 20,985 | 67.8 | −5.6 |
| Labour | Leo Goldstone | 6,308 | 20.4 | −6.2 |
| Liberal | Kenneth Grenville Wellings | 3,662 | 11.8 | New |
| Majority | | 14,677 | 47.4 | +0.6 |
| Turnout | | 47,077 | 65.8 | +0.3 |
| Conservative hold | | Swing | +5.9 | |

General election 1955: Chelsea
| Party | Candidate | Votes | % | ±% |
|---|---|---|---|---|
| Conservative | Allan Noble | 23,598 | 73.4 | +3.5 |
| Labour | Stewart Fordyce | 8,546 | 26.6 | −3.5 |
| Majority | | 15,052 | 46.8 | +7.0 |
| Turnout | | 49,049 | 65.5 | −4.1 |
| Conservative hold | | Swing | +3.5 | |

General election 1951: Chelsea
| Party | Candidate | Votes | % | ±% |
|---|---|---|---|---|
| Conservative | Allan Noble | 25,034 | 69.9 | +5.7 |
| Labour | Frederick Lionel Tonge | 10,784 | 30.1 | +2.8 |
| Majority | | 14,250 | 39.8 | +2.9 |
| Turnout | | 51,433 | 69.6 | −1.0 |
| Conservative hold | | Swing | +4.23 | |

General election 1950: Chelsea
| Party | Candidate | Votes | % | ±% |
|---|---|---|---|---|
| Conservative | Allan Noble | 23,471 | 64.2 | +0.5 |
| Labour | Frederick Lionel Tonge | 9,987 | 27.3 | −3.8 |
| Liberal | Leo Cayley Robertson | 3,116 | 8.5 | New |
| Majority | | 13,484 | 36.9 | +4.3 |
| Turnout | | 36,574 | 70.6 | +7.8 |
| Conservative hold | | Swing | +2.1 | |

=== Elections in the 1940s ===
General election 1945: Chelsea
| Party | Candidate | Votes | % | ±% |
|---|---|---|---|---|
| Conservative | Allan Noble | 12,043 | 63.7 | −11.3 |
| Labour | Margaret Douglas Shufeldt | 5,874 | 31.1 | +6.0 |
| Common Wealth | Dorothy Anderton Sharpe | 984 | 5.2 | New |
| Majority | | 6,169 | 32.6 | −17.3 |
| Turnout | | 30,095 | 62.8 | +1.1 |
| Conservative hold | | Swing | -8.6 | |

- Note 1 (1945): Changes and swing calculated from 1935 to 1945.
- Note 2 (1945): Counting of votes took place on 26 July 1945
- Boundary change
- Creation of Hoare as 1st Viscount Templewood

By-election 11 October 1944: Chelsea
| Party | Candidate | Votes | % | ±% |
|---|---|---|---|---|
| Conservative | William Sidney | Unopposed | | |
| Conservative hold | | | | |

=== Elections in the 1930s ===
General election 14 November 1935: Chelsea
| Party | Candidate | Votes | % | ±% |
|---|---|---|---|---|
| Conservative | Samuel Hoare | 18,992 | 75.0 | −8.0 |
| Labour | George Somerville Sandilands | 6,348 | 25.1 | +8.1 |
| Majority | | 12,644 | 49.9 | −16.1 |
| Turnout | | 41,061 | 61.7 | −3.5 |
| Conservative hold | | Swing | -8.0 | |

General election 27 October 1931: Chelsea
| Party | Candidate | Votes | % | ±% |
|---|---|---|---|---|
| Conservative | Samuel Hoare | 23,015 | 83.0 | +24.6 |
| Labour | Gilbert Foan | 4,726 | 17.0 | −8.1 |
| Majority | | 18,289 | 66.0 | +32.6 |
| Turnout | | 42,531 | 65.2 | +2.1 |
| Conservative hold | | Swing | +16.3 | |

=== Elections in the 1920s ===
General election 30 May 1929: Chelsea
| Party | Candidate | Votes | % | ±% |
|---|---|---|---|---|
| Unionist | Samuel Hoare | 15,480 | 58.4 | −7.3 |
| Labour | Alfred George Prichard | 6,645 | 25.1 | −0.9 |
| Liberal | Iolo Aneurin Williams | 4,360 | 16.5 | +9.1 |
| Majority | | 8,835 | 33.4 | −5.4 |
| Turnout | | 41,945 | 63.1 | −8.0 |
| Unionist hold | | Swing | -4.1 | |

General election 1924: Chelsea
| Party | Candidate | Votes | % | ±% |
|---|---|---|---|---|
| Unionist | Samuel Hoare | 13,816 | 65.7 | +8.7 |
| Labour | Dora Russell | 5,661 | 26.0 | −1.5 |
| Liberal | Iolo Aneurin Williams | 1,557 | 7.4 | −8.1 |
| Majority | | 8,155 | 38.8 | +9.3 |
| Turnout | | 29,582 | 71.1 | +7.3 |
| Unionist hold | | Swing | +5.1 | |

General election 6 December 1923: Chelsea
| Party | Candidate | Votes | % | ±% |
|---|---|---|---|---|
| Unionist | Samuel Hoare | 10,461 | 57.0 | −17.9 |
| Labour | Bertrand Russell | 5,047 | 27.5 | +2.4 |
| Liberal | Harry Westbury Preston | 2,846 | 15.5 | New |
| Majority | | 5,414 | 29.5 | −20.3 |
| Turnout | | 28,755 | 63.8 | +0.7 |
| Unionist hold | | Swing | -10.1 | |

General election 15 November 1922: Chelsea
| Party | Candidate | Votes | % | ±% |
|---|---|---|---|---|
| Unionist | Samuel Hoare | 13,437 | 74.9 | −4.2 |
| Labour | Bertrand Russell | 4,513 | 25.1 | New |
| Majority | | 8,924 | 49.8 | +8.6 |
| Turnout | | 28,453 | 63.1 | +16.5 |
| Unionist hold | | Swing | -14.7 | |

=== Elections in the 1910s ===
General election 1918: Chelsea
| Party | | Candidate | Votes | % | ±% |
|---|---|---|---|---|---|
| C | Unionist | Samuel Hoare | 9,159 | 79.1 | +18.6 |
| | Independent Progressive | Emily Phipps | 2,419 | 20.9 | New |
| Majority | | | 6,740 | 58.2 | +37.3 |
| Turnout | | | 24,822 | 46.6 | −26.4 |
| | Unionist hold | | Swing | | |
C indicates candidate endorsed by the coalition government.

Hoare

General election December 1910: Chelsea
| Party | Candidate | Votes | % | ±% |
|---|---|---|---|---|
| Conservative | Samuel Hoare | 4,968 | 60.5 | +2.4 |
| Liberal | Hugh Hoare | 3,249 | 39.5 | −2.4 |
| Majority | | 1,719 | 20.9 | +4.7 |
| Turnout | | 11,257 | 73.0 | −12.8 |
| Conservative hold | | Swing | +2.4 | |

General election January 1910: Chelsea
| Party | Candidate | Votes | % | ±% |
|---|---|---|---|---|
| Conservative | Samuel Hoare | 5,610 | 58.1 | +11.7 |
| Liberal | Emslie Horniman | 4,048 | 41.9 | −11.7 |
| Majority | | 1,562 | 16.2 | N/A |
| Turnout | | 11,257 | 85.8 | +10.5 |
| Conservative gain from Liberal | | Swing | +11.7 | |

=== Elections in the 1900s ===
Horniman

General election 16 January 1906: Chelsea
| Party | Candidate | Votes | % | ±% |
|---|---|---|---|---|
| Liberal | Emslie Horniman | 4,660 | 53.6 | +12.0 |
| Conservative | Charles Algernon Whitmore | 4,031 | 46.4 | −12.0 |
| Majority | | 629 | 7.2 | N/A |
| Turnout | | 8,691 | 75.3 | +12.9 |
| Registered electors | | 11,536 | | |
| Liberal gain from Conservative | | Swing | -12.0 | |

Jeffery

General election 1900: Chelsea
| Party | Candidate | Votes | % | ±% |
|---|---|---|---|---|
| Conservative | Charles Algernon Whitmore | 4,637 | 58.4 | −2.1 |
| Liberal | James Jeffery | 3,306 | 41.6 | +2.1 |
| Majority | | 1,331 | 16.8 | −4.2 |
| Turnout | | 7,943 | 62.4 | −5.7 |
| Registered electors | | 12,736 | | |
| Conservative hold | | Swing | -2.1 | |

=== Elections in the 1890s ===
General election 1895: Chelsea
| Party | Candidate | Votes | % | ±% |
|---|---|---|---|---|
| Conservative | Charles Algernon Whitmore | 5,524 | 60.5 | +7.5 |
| Liberal | Octavius Holmes Beatty | 3,604 | 39.5 | −7.5 |
| Majority | | 1,920 | 21.0 | +15.0 |
| Turnout | | 9,128 | 68.1 | −6.8 |
| Registered electors | | 13,408 | | |
| Conservative hold | | Swing | +7.5 | |

General election 1892: Chelsea
| Party | Candidate | Votes | % | ±% |
|---|---|---|---|---|
| Conservative | Charles Algernon Whitmore | 4,993 | 53.0 | +2.0 |
| Liberal | Benjamin Francis Conn Costelloe | 4,427 | 47.0 | −2.0 |
| Majority | | 566 | 6.0 | +4.0 |
| Turnout | | 9,420 | 74.9 | −1.0 |
| Registered electors | | 12,585 | | |
| Conservative hold | | Swing | +2.0 | |

=== Elections in the 1880s ===
General election 5 July 1886: Chelsea
| Party | Candidate | Votes | % | ±% |
|---|---|---|---|---|
| Conservative | Charles Algernon Whitmore | 4,304 | 51.0 | +2.0 |
| Liberal | Charles Dilke | 4,128 | 49.0 | −2.0 |
| Majority | | 176 | 2.0 | N/A |
| Turnout | | 8,432 | 75.9 | +0.2 |
| Registered electors | | 11,104 | | |
| Conservative gain from Liberal | | Swing | +2.0 | |

General election 25 November 1885: Chelsea
| Party | Candidate | Votes | % | ±% |
|---|---|---|---|---|
| Liberal | Charles Dilke | 4,291 | 51.0 | −5.1 |
| Conservative | Charles Algernon Whitmore | 4,116 | 49.0 | +5.0 |
| Majority | | 175 | 2.0 | N/A |
| Turnout | | 8,407 | 75.7 | +5.3 |
| Registered electors | | 11,104 | | |
| Liberal hold | | Swing | | |

- Constituency reduced to one seat.
- Swing: For 1885–1910 the swing figure given is the Butler Swing, defined as the average of the Conservative % gain and Liberal % loss between two elections, with the percentages being calculated on the basis of the total number of votes (including those cast for candidates other than Conservative or Liberal). A positive figure is a swing to Conservative and a negative one to Liberal.

By-election 11 January 1883: Chelsea
| Party | Candidate | Votes | % | ±% |
|---|---|---|---|---|
| Liberal | Charles Dilke | Unopposed | | |
| Liberal hold | | | | |

- Caused by the appointment of Dilke as President of the Local Government Board

General election 12 February 1880: Chelsea (2 seats)
| Party | Candidate | Votes | % | ±% |
|---|---|---|---|---|
| Liberal | Charles Dilke | 12,406 | 28.5 | −2.8 |
| Liberal | Joseph Bottomley Firth | 12,046 | 27.6 | −1.5 |
| Conservative | Algernon Keith-Falconer | 9,666 | 22.2 | −8.9 |
| Conservative | William Browne | 9,488 | 21.8 | N/A |
| Majority | | 2,380 | 5.4 | N/A |
| Turnout | | 21,803 (est) | 70.4 (est) | +2.1 |
| Registered electors | | 30,951 | | |
| Liberal hold | | Swing | +0.8 | |
| Liberal gain from Conservative | | Swing | +1.5 | |

=== Elections in the 1870s ===
General election 10 February 1874: Chelsea (2 seats)
| Party | Candidate | Votes | % | ±% |
|---|---|---|---|---|
| Liberal | Charles Dilke | 7,217 | 31.3 | −1.2 |
| Conservative | William Gordon | 7,172 | 31.1 | −4.7 |
| Liberal | Henry Hoare | 6,701 | 29.1 | −2.6 |
| Liberal | George Middleton Keill | 1,967 | 8.5 | N/A |
| Turnout | | 16,098 (est) | 68.3 (est) | +3.2 |
| Registered electors | | 23,560 | | |
| Majority | | 45 | 0.2 | −13.1 |
| Liberal hold | | Swing | +0.6 | |
| Majority | | 471 | 2.0 | N/A |
| Conservative gain from Liberal | | Swing | +0.2 | |

=== Elections in the 1860s ===
General election 17 November 1868: Chelsea (2 seats)
| Party | Candidate | Votes | % | ±% |
|---|---|---|---|---|
| Liberal | Charles Dilke | 7,374 | 32.5 | |
| Liberal | Henry Hoare | 7,183 | 31.7 | |
| Conservative | William Howard Russell | 4,177 | 18.4 | |
| Conservative | Charles James Freake | 3,929 | 17.3 | |
| Majority | | 3,006 | 13.3 | |
| Turnout | | 11,332 (est) | 65.1 (est) | |
| Registered electors | | 17,408 | | |
| Liberal win (new seat) | | | | |
| Liberal win (new seat) | | | | |

== See also ==
- List of parliamentary constituencies in London
- Duration of English, British and United Kingdom parliaments from 1660
