= Thomas Eustace Smith =

English shipping magnate and Liberal Party politician

Thomas Eustace Smith (1831–1903) was an English shipping magnate and Liberal Party politician.

== Biography ==
He was elected at the 1868 general election as the member of parliament (MP) for Tynemouth and North Shields, having stood unsuccessfully in Dover at the 1865 general election. He was re-elected in Tynemouth and North Shields at the 1874 and 1880 elections, and retired from the House of Commons when the constituency was abolished at the 1885 general election.

His father William Smith of Benton was a ropemaker.

Thomas Eustace Smith married Martha Mary Dalrymple, known as an art patron, in 1855. They had six daughters and four sons. Through Ashton Wentworth Dilke, who married the eldest daughter Maye (Margaret), Martha (known also as Ellen) came to meet his brother Charles Dilke. The implications of the sex scandal involving Charles Dilke that later came to court (in the form of the divorce case between Donald Crawford and his wife Virginia, another of their daughters) later undermined the Smiths' social position, since there were broad hints of adultery between Ellen and Charles Dilke.

Parliament of the United Kingdom
Preceded by George Otto Trevelyan	Member of Parliament for Tynemouth & North Shields; 1868 – 1885	Constituency abolished
