= Kensington and Chelsea (electoral division) =

Electoral division in Greater London, 1965–1973

- Former electoral division for the Greater London Council
- Kensington and Chelsea electoral division boundaries
- District: Royal Borough of Kensington and Chelsea
- Population: 208,480 (1969 estimate)
- Electorate: 149,519 (1964); 143,100 (1967); 144,537 (1970); 140,190 (1971)
- Area: 2,951.9 acres (11.946 km^{2})

Former electoral division
- Created: 1965
- Abolished: 1973
- Member: 3
- Replaced by: Chelsea and Kensington

Kensington and Chelsea was an electoral division for the purposes of elections to the Greater London Council. The constituency elected three councillors for a three-year term in 1964, 1967 and 1970.

== History ==
It was planned to use the same boundaries as the Westminster Parliament constituencies for election of councillors to the Greater London Council (GLC), as had been the practice for elections to the predecessor London County Council, but those that existed in 1965 crossed the Greater London boundary. Until new constituencies could be settled, the 32 London boroughs were used as electoral areas which therefore created a constituency called Kensington and Chelsea.

The electoral division was replaced from 1973 by the single-member electoral divisions of Chelsea and Kensington.

== Elections ==
The Kensington and Chelsea constituency was used for the Greater London Council elections in 1964, 1967 and 1970. Three councillors were elected at each election using first-past-the-post voting.

=== 1964 election ===
The first election was held on 9 April 1964, a year before the council came into its powers. The electorate was 149,519 and three Conservative Party councillors were elected. With 56,964 people voting, the turnout was 38.1%. The councillors were elected for a three-year term.

1964 Greater London Council election: Kensington and Chelsea
Party	Candidate	Votes	%	±%
Conservative	Sir Percy Rugg	34,683		
Conservative	Robert Louis Vigars	34,130		
Conservative	Seton Forbes Cockell	34,114		
Labour	Mrs. A. L. Grieves	15,824		
Labour	Mrs. O. M. Wilson	15,598		
Labour	T. W. Ives	15,001		
Liberal	Miss M. Neilson	5,352		
Liberal	P. C. Boucher	5,060		
Liberal	J. H. Crowhurst	4,981		
Communist	H. B. Collins	2,153		
Turnout				
Conservative win (new seat)				
Conservative win (new seat)				
Conservative win (new seat)				

=== 1967 election ===
The second election was held on 13 April 1967. The electorate was 143,100 and three Conservative Party councillors were elected. With 46,849 people voting, the turnout was 32.7%. The councillors were elected for a three-year term.

1967 Greater London Council election: Kensington and Chelsea
Party	Candidate	Votes	%	±%
Conservative	Sir Percy Rugg	32,173		
Conservative	Seton Forbes Cockell	31,871		
Conservative	Robert Louis Vigars	31,590		
Labour	T. M. Cox	9,220		
Labour	T. W. Ives	8,995		
Labour	T. Ponsonby	8,731		
Liberal	D. W. Berry	4,492		
Liberal	P. D. Spencer	4,292		
Liberal	D. Currie	3,959		
Communist	H. B. Collins	1,458		
Turnout				
Conservative hold		Swing		
Conservative hold		Swing		
Conservative hold		Swing		

=== 1970 election ===
The third election was held on 9 April 1970. The electorate was 144,537 and three Conservative Party councillors were elected. With 39,082 people voting, the turnout was 27.0%. The councillors were elected for a three-year term.

1970 Greater London Council election: Kensington and Chelsea
Party	Candidate	Votes	%	±%
Conservative	Seton Forbes Cockell	25,320		
Conservative	William Archibald Ottley Juxon Bell	25,267		
Conservative	Robert Louis Vigars	25,049		
Labour	Bruce Douglas-Mann	9,180		
Labour	R. Pope	9,175		
Labour	J. F. S. Keys	9,148		
Liberal	Lady Ogmore	2,457		
Liberal	L. Spicer	2,333		
Liberal	T. J. T. Metcalf	2,253		
Homes before Roads	T. Bendixson	1,163		
Homes before Roads	A. Ritchie	1,003		
Homes before Roads	D. Wiggins	952		
Communist	E. S. Adams	771		
Union Movement	A. E. Brown	215		
Turnout				
Conservative hold		Swing		
Conservative hold		Swing		
Conservative hold		Swing		

=== 1971 by-election ===
A by-election was held on 2 December 1971, following the death of Seton Forbes Cockell. The electorate was 140,190 and one Conservative Party councillor was elected. With 14,720 voting, the turnout was 10.5%

Kensington and Chelsea by-election, 1971
Party	Candidate	Votes	%	±%
Conservative	Muriel Gumbel	9,839		
Labour	J. F. S. Keys	4,343		
Ind. Conservative	R. E. G. Simmerson	333		
Independent	A. F. Gloak	195		
Turnout				
Conservative hold		Swing		

Gloak - Kensington and Chelsea Ratepayers and Residents Association
