= List of members of the Greater London Council =

The following people served as members of the Greater London Council, either as councillors or aldermen.

== Background ==
From the first election in 1964, there were 100 councillors from 32 multi-member constituencies. There were also 16 aldermen elected by the council, giving a total of 116 members. This was revised to 92 councillors from single-member constituencies from the 1973 election. The number of aldermen was reduced to 15, giving a total of 107 members. The post of alderman was eliminated in 1977.

Councillors were elected for three-year terms on 9 April 1964, 13 April 1967, 9 April 1970 and 12 April 1973. The 1973 terms were extended by a year to introduce a four-year cycle. Councillors were elected for four-year terms on 5 May 1977 and 7 May 1981. The 1981 terms were extended by a year so their end coincided with the abolition of the council.

Aldermanic elections took place at the first meeting of the council after the general election of councillors on 27 April 1964, 2 May 1967, 28 April 1970, and 4 May 1973. The 8 aldermen elected with the fewest votes in 1964 were for three-year terms and the other 8 had six-year terms. 8 aldermen were elected for six-year terms in 1967 and 1970. In 1973, 7 aldermen were elected for six-year terms. In 1976, aldermen elected in 1970 had their terms extended to seven years and those elected 1973 had their terms shortened to four years so their end coincided with the abolition of the post of aldermen.

== A ==
| Name | Took office | Left office | Party | Election | Constituency | Ref. |
|---|---|---|---|---|---|---|
| Frank Abbott | 1967 | 1977 | Conservative | 1967; 1970 | Wandsworth; Alderman | |
| Peter Anderson | 1964 | 1967 | Labour | 1964 | Ealing | |
| John Andrews | 1964 | 1973 | Labour | 1964, 1967 | Greenwich | |
| Geoffrey Aplin | 1964 | 1981 | Conservative | 1964, 1967, 1970; 1973, 1977 | Croydon; Croydon South | |
| Tony Arbour | 1983 | 1986 | Conservative | 1983 | Surbiton | |
| Francis Archer | 1973 | 1977 | Labour | 1973 | Erith and Crayford | |
| Jeffrey Archer | 1967 | 1970 | Conservative | 1967 | Havering | |
| David Ashby | 1977 | 1981 | Conservative | 1977 | Woolwich West | |
| John Aston | 1964 | 1970 | Conservative | 1964, 1964 | Croydon | |
| David Avery | 1981 | 1986 | Conservative | 1981 | City of London and Westminster South | |

== B ==
- George Nicholas Alexander Bailey (C): Brentford and Isleworth 1977 – 31 March 1986
- Lawrence Arthur Bains (C): Haringey 1967–1973; Hornsey 1973–1981
- David Gilbert Baker (C): Alderman 1967–1970
- Richard Andrew Balfe (Lab): Dulwich 1973–1977
- Maud Ball (Lab): Barking 1964–1970
- Frank Banfield (Lab): Alderman 1964 – 31 March 1970
- Tony Banks (Lab): Hammersmith 1970–1973; Fulham 1973–1977; Tooting 1981 – 31 March 1986
- Benita Dorothy Barham (C): Bromley 1964–1970
- Dudley Eric Reynolds Barker (Lab): Croydon North West 1973–1977
- Phillip John Bassett (Lab): Carshalton 1973–1977
- Robert Brian Bastin (Lab): Lewisham 1970–1973
- Brian Caldwell Cook Batsford (C): Alderman 1967 – 22 April 1970
- Edwin Bayliss (Lab): Islington 1964–1967
- Anthony William Bays (C): Upminster 1981 – 31 March 1986
- Neville Beale (C): Finchley 1981 – 31 March 1986
- Edith Gordon Beecher-Bryant (C): Bromley 1964–1970
- Roland Charles Beecher-Bryant (C): Bromley 1970–1973
- Edward Percy Bell (Lab): Newham 1964–1973; Newham South 1973–1981
- William Archibald Ottley Juxon Bell (C): Kensington and Chelsea 1970–1973; Chelsea 1973 – 31 March 1986
- Vivian Bendall (C): Croydon 1970–1973
- Francis Ernest Herman Bennett (C): Alderman 1964–1977
- Alfred Abram Berney (C): Brent 1967–1973
- Peter Blair Black (C): Barnet 1964–1973; Hendon South 1973 – 31 March 1986
- Christopher Bland (C): Lewisham 1967–1970
- Timothy James Bligh (C): Alderman 1967 – 12 March 1969
- Paul Boateng (Lab): Walthamstow 1981 – 31 March 1986
- Stanley Charles Bolton (C): Merton 1970–1973; Wimbledon 1973 – 31 March 1986
- Louis Wolfgang Bondy (Lab): Camden 1964–1967; Islington 1970–1973; Islington North 1973–1981
- Iris Mary Caroline Bonham (Lab): Hammersmith 18 June 1964 – 1967 and 1970–1973; Hammersmith North 1973–1977
- Gerald Bowden (C): Dulwich 1977–1981
- Samuel Boyce (Lab): Newham 1964–1973
- Anthony Vincent Bradbury (C): Wandsworth 1967–1970
- Sheila Mary Bradley (C): Greenwich 1967 – 24 May 1967
- Ashley Bramall (Lab): Tower Hamlets 1964–1973; Bethnal Green and Bow 1973 – 31 March 1986
- John Patrick Branagan (Lab): Tower Hamlets 1964–1973; Stepney and Poplar 1973 – 31 March 1986
- Richard Maddock Brew (C): Alderman 8 October 1968 – 1973; Chingford 1973 – 31 March 1986
- Bernard Brook-Partridge (C): Havering 1967–1973; Romford 1973 – 21 May 1985
- Bernard Joseph Brown (C): Hillingdon 1967–1973; Ruislip-Northwood 1973–1977
- Steve Bundred (Lab): Islington North 1981 – 31 March 1986
- Richard Brownrigg Butterfield (C): Camden 1967–1970

== C ==
- Audrey Elizabeth Callaghan (Lab): Alderman 1964–1970
- Leila Campbell (Lab): Camden 1964–1967
- Ewan Geddes Carr (Lab): Alderman 28 April 1970 – 1973; Vauxhall 1973 – 17 December 1979
- John Adam Carr (Lab): Hackney Central 1981 – 31 March 1986
- Dennis Annesley Carradice (Lab): Ilford South 1973–1977
- Bryan Cassidy (C): Hendon North 1977 – 31 March 1986
- Edward Cyril Castle (Lab): Alderman 1964–1970
- Florence Cayford (Lab): Islington 1964–1967
- Christopher Charles Henry Chalker (C): Hillingdon 1967–1970
- David Walter Chalkley (Lab): Lewisham 1964–1967 and 1970–1973; Deptford 1973–1981
- Irene Chaplin (Lab): Islington 1964–1967; Hackney 1967–1973; Hackney South and Shoreditch 1973–1977
- Geoffrey Chase-Gardner (C): Hounslow 1967–1973
- Christopher Chataway (C): Alderman 1967 – 22 April 1970
- Alfred Frederick Joseph Chorley (Lab): Alderman 1964–1970, 4 May 1971 – 1977
- Frederick Denis Christian (C): Richmond-upon-Thames 1964–1967
- Charles James Christopher (Lab): Alderman 1964–1967
- Jill Elizabeth Clack (C): Harrow Central 1981 – 31 March 1986
- William Sydney Clack (C): Harrow 1970–1973; Harrow Central 1973–1981
- James Albert Edward Collins (Lab): Waltham Forest 1964–1967
- John Stewart Collins (C): Hammersmith 1967–1970
- Richard Collins (Lab): Camden 1970–1973; Alderman 1973–1977; Holborn and St. Pancras South 1977 – 1 December 1978
- John Alfred Boris Connors (C): Enfield North 1977–1981
- Frank Arthur Cooper (Lab): Hendon North 1973–1977
- Sonia Copland (C): Lewisham East 1977–1981; Carshalton 1981 – 31 March 1986
- Harry William Corpe (C): Edmonton 1977–1981
- John Rowland Wilton Cox (C): Hillingdon 1970–1973
- Robert John Crane (Lab): Barking 1967–1973; Dagenham 1973-13 October 1974
- Malby Sturges Crofton (C): Lambeth 1970–1973; Ealing North 1977–1981
- Horace Cutler (C): Harrow 1964–1973; Harrow West 1973 – 31 March 1986

== D ==
- James Daly (Lab): Brentford and Isleworth 1973–1977
- Gareth John Daniel (Lab): Ealing North 1981 – 31 March 1986
- Countess of Dartmouth (Raine Legge) (C): Richmond-upon-Thames 1967–1973
- Peter John Dawe (Lab): Leyton 1981 – 31 March 1986
- Bryn Davies (Lab): Vauxhall 21 February 1980 – 21 May 1985
- David John Davies (Lab): Hillingdon 1964–1967
- Neil Davies (Lab): Woolwich West 1981 – 31 March 1986
- Evelyn Joyce Denington (Lab): Camden 1964–1967; Islington 1967–1973; Islington Central 1973–1977
- Gladys Felicia Dimson (Lab): Haringey 1964–1967; Wandsworth 1970–1973; Battersea North 1973 – 2 May 1985
- Gordon Laurence Dixon (C): Enfield 1964–1970
- John Chaytor Dobson (C): Ealing 1970–1973; Acton 1973 – 31 March 1986
- Jack Dunnett (Lab): Hounslow 1964–1967

== E ==
- Douglas Eden (Lab) (Ind): Feltham and Heston 1973–1977
- Richard Edmonds (Lab): Hammersmith 1964–1967
- Arthur Frank George Edwards (Lab): Newham 1964–1973; Newham North West 1973 – 31 March 1986
- Arthur George Edwards (Lab): Alderman 1964–1967; Hammersmith 1970–1973
- Keith Andrew Edwards (C): Croydon 1964–1967
- George Frederick Everitt (C): Sutton 1964–1973

== F ==
- Timothy Charles Farmer (C): Alderman 1967 – 11 October 1971
- Michael William Walter Farrow (C): Ealing 1970–1973
- Herbert Ferguson (Lab): Alderman 1964–1970
- Douglas Melville Fielding (C): Bexley 1967–1973; Sidcup 1973–1977
- Bill Fiske (Lab): Havering 1964–1967
- Antony Thomas Reid Fletcher (C): Ealing 1967–1970
- Jennifer Fletcher (Lab): Tottenham 5 May 1983 – 31 March 1986
- Muriel Forbes (Lab): Brent 1964–1967
- Ann M. Forbes-Cockell (C): Brent 1967–1973
- Seton Forbes-Cockell (C): Kensington and Chelsea 1964 – 19 September 1971
- Frederick James Francis (Lab): Southwark 1970–1973
- Leslie Freeman (C): Alderman 1964–1977
- Roland John Michael Freeman (C): Westminster and the City of London 1967–1970; Finchley 15 May 1975 – 1981
- Edwin Furness (Lab): Bexley 1964–1967

== G ==
- Maurice Patrick Gaffney (C): Ealing 1967–1970; Westminster and the City of London 1970–1973
- Oliver John Galley (C): Harrow 1964 – 2 October 1965
- Rachel Trixie Anne Gardner (C): Havering 1970–1973; Southgate 1977 – 31 March 1986
- Montague William Garrett (C): Richmond-upon-Thames 1964–1967
- Mair Garside (Lab): Greenwich 1970–1973; Woolwich East 1973 – 31 March 1986
- Edgar Victor Garton (Lab): Alderman 1964–1970
- Diana Elizabeth Geddes (C): Lambeth 1970–1973; Streatham 1973–1977
- Rodney Charles Gent (C): Sidcup 1977 – 31 March 1986
- Ronald Gilbey (C): Haringey 1967–1973
- Peter Stuart Gill (C): Croydon South 1977 – 31 March 1986
- Lilias Girdwood Gillies (Lab): Tooting 1973–1977
- William Arthur Gillman (Lab): Havering 1964–1967
- Louis Gluckstein (C): Westminster and the City of London 1964–1967; Alderman 1967–1973
- Reg Goodwin (Lab): Southwark 1964–1973; Bermondsey 1973–1981
- Edward Stephen Gouge (Lab): Ilford South 1981 – 31 March 1986
- John Graham (C): Ealing 1967–1970
- Alec Alan Grant (Lab): Lewisham 1964–1967 and 1970–1973
- Alan Greengross (C): Hampstead 1977 – 31 March 1986
- Anna Lloyd Grieves (Lab): Lambeth 1970–1973; Lambeth Central 1973–1981
- Michael Grylls (C): Westminster and the City of London 1967–1970
- Muriel Gumbel (C): Lambeth 1967–1970; Kensington and Chelsea 2 December 1971 – 1973; Sutton and Cheam 1977 – 31 March 1986

== H ==
- Rose Hacker (Lab): St. Pancras North 1973–1977
- Thomas Alfred Leefe Ham (C): Tooting 1977–1981
- John Hammond (C): Redbridge 1970–1973
- Lesley Hammond (Lab): Dulwich 1981 – 31 March 1986
- Elgar Handy (Lab): Erith and Crayford 1981 – 31 March 1986
- Alan Hardy (C): Brent 1967–1973; Brent North 1973 – 31 March 1986
- Illtyd Harrington (Lab): Brent 1964–1967; Alderman 28 April 1970 – 1973; Brent South 1973 – 31 March 1986
- Andrew Phillip Harris (Lab): Putney 1981 – 21 May 1985
- David Harris (C): Bromley 7 November 1968 – 1973; Ravensbourne 1973–1977
- John Leonard Harris (C): Putney 1977–1981
- Anthony Bernard Hart (Lab): Hornsey 1981 – 31 March 1986
- Maureen Harwood (Lab): Alderman 1973–1977
- Stephen Haseler (Lab) (Ind): Wood Green 1973–1977
- Stephen Robert Hatch (Lab): Battersea South 1973–1977
- Joseph Henry Haygarth (C): Barnet 1964–1967
- John Charles Henry (Lab): Lewisham 1964–1967 and 1970–1973; Lewisham East 1973–1977
- Alan Lewis Herbert (Lab): Lewisham West 24 April 1980 – 2 August 1984 and 20 September 1984 – 31 March 1986
- Arthur James Hichisson (C): Lewisham 1967–1970; Alderman 1970–1977
- Christopher Thomas Higgins (Lab): Ealing 1964–1967
- Ellis Hillman (Lab): Hackney 1964–1973; Hackney Central 1973–1981
- Harvey Hinds (Lab): Southwark 1967–1973; Peckham 1973 – 31 March 1986
- Roger Eden Hiskey (C): Lewisham West 1977 – 4 February 1980
- Norman Howard (Lab): Brent East 1973 – 31 March 1986
- Thomas Charles Hudson (C): Enfield 1970–1973
- Robert Gurth Hughes (C): Croydon Central 20 March 1980 – 31 March 1986
- Arthur Horace Sydney Hull (C): Hayes and Harlington 15 December 1977 – 1981
- Robert William George Humphreys (Lab): Lambeth 1964–1967

== J ==
- Francis Herbert James (C): Redbridge 1964–1970
- Andrew Jardine (C): Alderman 1964–1967; Hounslow 1967–1973
- Margaret Christian Jay (Lab): Wandsworth 1964–1967
- Ethel Marie Jenkins (Lab): Wandsworth 1970–1973; Putney 1973–1977
- Margaret Anne Jenkins (Lab): Putney 11 July 1985 – 31 March 1986
- Thomas Alfred Jenkinson (Lab): Newham North East 1973–1977; Newham South 1977–1981
- Toby Jessel (C): Richmond-upon-Thames 1967–1973
- Julia Ada Johnson (Lab): Greenwich 1964–1967
- Ethel Winifred Jones (Lab): Ealing 1964–1967
- William Emlyn Jones (C): Harrow 1964 – 6 June 1969
- Anthony Robert Judge (Lab): Mitcham and Morden 1973–1977 and 1981 – 31 March 1986

== K ==
- Harry Kay (Lab): Dagenham 30 January 1975 – 31 March 1986
- Alexander John Kazantzis (Lab): Camden 1970–1973; Holborn and St. Pancras South 1973–1977
- Ernest Kinghorn (Lab): Hounslow 1964–1967
- Arnold Kinzley (C): Ilford South 1977–1981
- Patricia Mary Kirwan (C): Paddington 1977–1981
- Albert George Knowlden (C): Alderman 1964–1967

== L ==
- Harry Lamborn (Lab): Southwark 1964–1973
- Victor Rae Muske Langton (C): Bexley 1967–1973; Bexleyheath 1973 – 31 March 1986
- Alan Horace Lewis Leach (C): Sutton 1967–1973
- Robin Hubert Leach (C): Ealing 1967–1970
- Edward Leigh (C): Richmond 1977–1981
- James Anthony Lemkin (C): Uxbridge 1973 – 31 March 1986
- Rita Maisie Levy (C): Barnet 19 October 1972 – 1973
- Robert Gwilym Lewis-Jones (C): Carshalton 1977–1981
- William John Lipscombe (Lab): Hillingdon 1964–1967
- Kenneth Watson Little (Lab): Edmonton 1981 – 2 August 1984 and 20 September 1984 – 31 March 1986
- William Wycliffe Livingston (C): Lambeth 1967–1973
- Ken Livingstone (Lab): Norwood 1973–1977; Hackney North and Stoke Newington 1977–1981; Paddington 1981 – 2 August 1984 and 20 September 1984 – 31 March 1986
- Serge Lourie (Lab): Hornchurch 1973–1977
- Betty Kathleen Lowton (Lab): Waltham Forest 1964–1967
- John Vincent Norman Lucas (Lab): Battersea North 27 June 1985 – 31 March 1986

== M ==
- Anthony McBrearty (Lab): Enfield North 1981 – 31 March 1986
- John McDonnell (Lab): Hayes and Harlington 1981 – 2 August 1984 and 20 September 1984 – 31 March 1986
- Andrew McIntosh (Lab): Tottenham 1973 – 1 March 1983
- Marjorie McIntosh (Lab): Hammersmith 1964 – 6 May 1964
- Alexander Charles Mackay (Lab): Deptford 1981 – 31 March 1986
- Alexander McLaughlin (Lab): Wandsworth 15 June 1972 – 1973
- Terence Charles McMillan (Lab): Alderman 1964–1967
- John Reveley Major (C): Hornchurch 1977–1981; Chipping Barnet 1981 – 31 March 1986
- Michael Peter Russell Malynn (C): Haringey 1967–1973
- Isita Clare Mansel (C): Camden 1967–1970
- Walter Kenneth Mansfield (Lab): Alderman 1973–1977
- Reginald Marks (C): Barnet 1964–1973; Chipping Barnet 1973–1977
- Bernard Stephen Mason (Lab): Edmonton 1973–1977
- David Michael Mason (Lab): Ealing North 1973–1977
- John Mason (C): Alderman 1964–1967; Bexley 1967–1973
- Stanley Wilfred Mayne (Lab): Alderman 1973–1977
- Sidney Aubrey Melman (Lab): Lambeth 1964–1967
- Jean Merriton (Lab): Paddington 1973–1977
- Peggy Middleton (Lab): Greenwich 1967 – 26 August 1974
- Charles Henry Miles (C): Greenwich 1967–1970
- Victor Mishcon (Lab): Lambeth 1964–1967
- Robert Mitchell (C): Redbridge 1964–1973; Wanstead and Woodford 1973 – 31 March 1986
- Ronald Dennis Mitchell (C): Feltham and Heston 1977–1981
- Victor Sidney Henry Mitchell (C): Bromley 1964–1967
- Thomas Broughton Mitcheson (C): Enfield 1964–1973; Southgate 1973–1977
- Paul David Moore (Lab): Lambeth Central 1981 – 31 March 1986
- Gladys Emma Morgan (C): Croydon 1967–1973; Croydon North East 5 September 1974 – 17 January 1980
- Joan Margaret Morgan (Lab): Hackney South and Shoreditch 1977 – 31 March 1986
- Frances Morrell (Lab): Islington South and Finsbury 1981 – 31 March 1986
- Harold Trevor Mote (C): Harrow 27 January 1966 – 1973; Harrow East 1973 – 31 March 1986
- Norman Sidney Munday (C): Waltham Forest 1967–1973
- George Edward Mynott (C): Waltham Forest 1967–1970

== N ==
- Bob Neill (C): Romford 11 July 1985 – 31 March 1986
- Waldemar Thor Neilson-Hansen (C): Leyton 1977–1981
- George Edward Nicholson (Lab): Bermondsey 1981 – 31 March 1986

== O ==
- Luke Patrick O'Connor (Lab): Camden 1970–1973; Alderman 1973–1977
- Peter Otwell (Lab): Brent 1964–1967

== P ==
- George Francis Palmer (Lab): Ealing 1964–1967
- Mark Jonathan David Damian Lister Patterson (C): Ealing 1970–1973; Chipping Barnet 1977–1981
- Geoffrey Pattie (C): Lambeth 1967–1970
- Arthur Sidney Peacock (C): Barnet 1967 – 27 June 1972
- Bernard James Perkins (C): Alderman 19 October 1971 – 1973
- Jane Phillips (Lab): Hammersmith 1964–1967
- David Thomas Pitt (Lab): Hackney 1964–1973; Hackney North and Stoke Newington 1973–1977
- Peter Samuel Pitt (Lab): Feltham and Heston 1981 – 31 March 1986
- Desmond Plummer (C): Westminster and the City of London 1964–1973; St. Marylebone 1973 – 3 March 1976
- Thomas Ponsonby (Lab): Alderman 1970–1977
- André William Potier (C): Hillingdon 1967–1970
- Fred Powe (Lab): Hounslow 1964–1967
- John Nicoll Powrie (Lab): Bexley 1964–1967
- Charles Henry Ernst Pratt (C): Bromley 1970–1973
- Charles Prendergast (Lab): Barking 1964 – 10 February 1967
- Reginald Prentice (Lab): Alderman 1970 – 29 March 1971
- Norman Prichard (Lab): Wandsworth 1964–1967, 1970 – 10 April 1972
- John Charles Putnam (C): Fulham 1977–1981

== R ==
- Simon James Crawford Randall (C): Beckenham 1981 – 31 March 1986
- Frank Herbert Rapley (Lab): Hillingdon 1964–1967
- Edgar Ernest Reed (Lab): Southwark 1964–1970
- Margaret Rees (Lab): Woolwich West 1973–1977
- Annie Florence Remington (Lab): Haringey 1964–1967
- Albert James Retter (C): Hayes and Harlington 1977 – 22 October 1977
- Timothy J. Ridoutt (Lab): Ilford North 1973–1977
- Jenefer Gwendolen Anne Riley (C): Wood Green 1977–1981
- Sydney William Leonard Ripley (C): Kingston upon Thames 1964 – 31 March 1986
- Shelagh Marjorie Roberts (C): Havering 1970–1973; Upminster 1973–1981
- Bernard Harry Rockman (Lab): Alderman 1964–1967
- Marion Roe (C): Ilford North 1977 – 31 March 1986
- Arthur James Rolfe (C): Croydon North East 20 March 1980 – 31 March 1986
- Hazel Corinne Rose (Lab): Islington 1967–1970
- Gerald Ross (Lab): Hackney North and Stoke Newington 1981 – 31 March 1986
- Charles Andrew Rossi (Lab): Holborn and St. Pancras South 8 March 1979 – 31 March 1986
- Paul Nigel Rossi (Lab) (SDP): Lewisham East 1981 – 31 March 1986
- George Frederick Rowe (Lab): Wandsworth 1964–1967
- Stanley Graham Rowlandson (C): Enfield 1964–1973
- Bertie Edwin Roycraft (Lab): Havering 1964–1967
- Percy Rugg (C): Kensington and Chelsea 1964–1970
- Stanley Rundle (L): Richmond 1973–1977
- Peter Frank Norman Russell (Lab): Hayes and Harlington 1973–1977

== S ==
- Samuel Isidore Salmon (C): Westminster and the City of London 1964–1967
- Albert Samuels (Lab): Southwark 1964–1967
- Joseph Simeon Samuels (Lab): Wandsworth 1964–1967, 1970–1973
- Herbert Henry Sandford (C): St. Marylebone 8 April 1976 – 31 March 1986
- Paul Alexander Saunders (C): Croydon 1964–1967
- Mervyn Nelson Scorgie (C): Westminster and the City of London 1970–1973; City of London and Westminster South 1973–1981
- Jean Leslie Scott (C): Barnet 1964–1973; Finchley 1973 – 20 March 1975
- Thomas William Scott (C): Merton 1964–1970
- Geoffrey John David Seaton (C): Kingston upon Thames 1964–1973; Surbiton 1973 – 27 June 1983
- Harold Sebag-Montefiore (C): Westminster and the City of London 1964–1973
- Beatrice Serota (Lab): Lambeth 1964–1967
- Ruth Shaw (L): Sutton and Cheam 1973–1977
- Harold Shearman (Lab): Lewisham 1964–1967
- William Jeremy Masefield Shelton (C): Wandsworth 1967–1970
- Brian Joseph Shenton (C): Mitcham and Morden 1977–1981
- William Alfred Sibley (C): Havering 12 December 1968 – 1970
- Yvonne Sieve (Lab): Southall 1973 – 31 March 1986
- David Howard Simpson (Lab): Croydon North East 1973 – 18 July 1974; Alderman 21 September 1976 – 1977
- William Colbert Simson (Lab): Lewisham West 1973–1977
- Adrian Carnegie Slade (L): Richmond 1981 – 31 March 1986
- Frank Willie Smith (C): Bromley 1967–1973; Beckenham 1973–1981
- Norman John David Smith (C): Norwood 1977 – 31 March 1986
- William Christopher Smith (C): Hammersmith 1967–1970; Hammersmith North 1977–1981
- Anne Sofer (Lab) (SDP): St. Pancras North 1977 – 23 September 1981 and 29 October 1981 – 31 March 1986
- Donald Soper (Lab): Alderman 1964-13 May 1965
- Barrington John Stead (Lab): Fulham 1981 – 31 March 1986
- Maurice Stephenson (C): Alderman 29 April 1969 – 1973
- Stephen James Stewart (C): Croydon 1967–1973; Croydon North West 1977 – 31 March 1986
- Oliver Stutchbury (Lab): Alderman 1973 – 3 September 1976
- Frederick William Styles (Lab): Greenwich 24 October 1974 – 1981
- Jack Elmer Swanson (C): Wandsworth 1967–1970

== T ==
- Jean Tatham (C): Orpington 1973 – 31 March 1986
- Cyril Julian Hebden Taylor (C): Ruislip-Northwood 1977 – 31 March 1986
- Gordon William Herbert Taylor (C): Alderman 3 October 1972 – 1977; Croydon Central 1977 – 21 January 1980
- Ruby Georgina Nancy Taylor (C): Brent 1967–1973
- Anne Sylvia Terry (C): Redbridge 1964–1967
- Frederick William Thompson (C): Sutton 1964–1967
- Robin Beauchamp Thompson (Lab): Bexley 1964–1967
- Neil Gordon Thorne (C): Redbridge 1967–1973
- Raymond David Clive Thornton (C): Havering 1967 – 13 November 1968
- Frederick Lionel Tonge (Lab): Alderman 6 July 1965 – 1967
- Frank Towell (Lab): Brent 1964–1967
- Richard Town (C): Erith and Crayford 1977–1981
- Lena Townsend (C): Camden 1967–1970; Alderman 1970–1977
- George William Tremlett (C) (Ind C): Hillingdon 1970–1973; Twickenham 1973 – 31 March 1986
- Mike Tuffrey (L): Vauxhall 11 July 1985 – 31 March 1986
- Robert Joseph Turner (C): Bromley 1964 – 27 September 1968
- Simon John Turney (Lab): Islington Central 1977 – 31 March 1986

== U ==
- John Oliver Udal (C): Alderman 1967–1973
- Dyas Cyril Loftus Usher (C): Hounslow 1967–1973

== V ==
- Gerard Folliott Vaughan (C): Lambeth 1967–1970; Alderman 1970 – 18 September 1972
- Robert Louis Vigars (C): Kensington and Chelsea 1964–1973; Kensington 1973 – 31 March 1986
- Louis Albert Vitoria (Lab): Haringey 1964–1967

== W ==
- Jeremy James Wagg (C): Hammersmith 1967–1970
- Frederick William Walker (C): Merton 1964–1973
- John James Walsh (Lab): Leyton 1973–1977
- Lady Walton (Nellie Margaret Walton) (C): Alderman 1967 – 2 October 1968
- John Benjamin Ward (Lab): Barking 1970–1973; Barking 1973 – 31 March 1986
- Michael Ward (Lab): Wood Green 1981 – 31 March 1986
- John Golden Warren (Lab): Alderman 1973–1977
- William Watts (Lab): Alderman 28 April 1970 – 1973
- Gordon Alexander Webb (C): Waltham Forest 1967–1973
- Mavis Joan Webster (Lab): Waltham Forest 1964 – 27 November 1966
- David Christopher Wetzel (Lab): Hammersmith North 1981 – 31 March 1986
- Frederick Walter Weyer (C): Lewisham 1967–1970; Streatham 1977 – 31 March 1986
- Michael John Wheeler (C): Lewisham 1967–1970; Ravensbourne 1977 – 31 March 1986
- David Frank White (Lab): Croydon Central 1973–1977
- John Howard White (Lab): Enfield North 1973–1977
- Arthur Wicks (Lab): Hackney 1964–1967; Islington 1967–1973; Islington South and Finsbury 1973–1981
- Alan Ronald Williams (Lab): Hornchurch 1981 – 31 March 1986
- Margaret Williams (C): Battersea South 1977–1981
- Phillip Charles Desmond Williams (C): Waltham Forest 1970–1973
- John Wilson (Lab): Newham North East 1977 – 31 March 1986
- Valerie Wise (Lab): Battersea South 1981 – 31 March 1986
- Enid Barbara Wistrich (Lab): Hampstead 1973–1977
- Deirdre Frances Mary Wood (Lab): Greenwich 1981 – 31 March 1986
- Joan Kathleen Wykes (C): Chislehurst 1973 – 31 March 1986

== Y ==
- George Young (C): Ealing 1970–1973
- James Young (Lab): Greenwich 1964–1967
- Robin Ainsworth Raine Young (Lab): Walthamstow 1973–1981

== Parties ==
C: Conservative Party
Ind: Independent
Ind C: Unofficial Conservative
L: Liberal Party
Lab: Labour Party
SDP: Social Democratic Party
