= Richmond upon Thames (electoral division) =

Electoral division in Greater London, 1965–1973

- Former electoral division for the Greater London Council
- Richmond upon Thames electoral division boundaries from 1970 to 1973
- District: London Borough of Richmond upon Thames
- Population: 176,600 (1969 estimate)
- Electorate: 128,699 (1964); 124,793 (1967); 130,682 (1970)
- Major settlements: Richmond, Twickenham
- Area: 13,645.3 acres (55.221 km^{2})

Former electoral division
- Created: 1965
- Abolished: 1973
- Member(s): 2
- Replaced by: Richmond and Twickenham

Richmond upon Thames was an electoral division for the purposes of elections to the Greater London Council. The constituency elected two councillors for a three-year term in 1964, 1967 and 1970.

== History ==
It was planned to use the same boundaries as the Westminster Parliament constituencies for election of councillors to the Greater London Council (GLC), as had been the practice for elections to the predecessor London County Council, but those that existed in 1965 crossed the Greater London boundary. Until new constituencies could be settled, the 32 London boroughs were used as electoral areas which therefore created a constituency called Richmond upon Thames.

The boundaries of the electoral division were adjusted on 1 April 1970.

The electoral division was replaced from 1973 by the single-member electoral divisions of Richmond and Twickenham.

== Elections ==
The Richmond upon Thames constituency was used for the Greater London Council elections in 1964, 1967 and 1970. Two councillors were elected at each election using first-past-the-post voting.

=== 1964 election ===
The first election was held on 9 April 1964, a year before the council came into its powers. The electorate was 128,699 and two Conservative Party councillors were elected. With 69,031 people voting, the turnout was 53.6%. The councillors were elected for a three-year term.

1964 Greater London Council election: Richmond upon Thames
Party	Candidate	Votes	%	±%
Conservative	Frederick Denis Christian	34,259		
Conservative	Montague William Garrett	34,029		
Labour	G. H. Loman	19,649		
Labour	T. R. Starr	19,557		
Liberal	D. V. G. Feltham	12,379		
Liberal	L. Worth	11,205		
Communist	A. J. Banfield	1,947		
Turnout				
Conservative win (new seat)				
Conservative win (new seat)				

=== 1967 election ===
The second election was held on 13 April 1967. The electorate was 124,793 and two Conservative Party councillors were elected. With 62,605 people voting, the turnout was 50.2%. The councillors were elected for a three-year term.

1967 Greater London Council election: Richmond upon Thames
Party	Candidate	Votes	%	±%
Conservative	Countess of Dartmouth	35,246		
Conservative	Toby Henry Francis Jessel	35,032		
Labour	G. J. Samuel	16,020		
Labour	C. W. Sewell	15,987		
Liberal	D. V. G. Feltham	8,902		
Liberal	L. Worth	8,197		
Communist	A. J. Banfield	1,427		
Turnout				
Conservative hold		Swing		
Conservative hold		Swing		

=== 1970 election ===
The third election was held on 9 April 1970. The electorate was 130,682 and two Conservative Party councillors were elected. With 53,148 people voting, the turnout was 40.7%. The councillors were elected for a three-year term.

1970 Greater London Council election: Richmond upon Thames
Party	Candidate	Votes	%	±%
Conservative	Toby Henry Francis Jessel	30,691		
Conservative	Countess of Dartmouth	29,591		
Labour	J. H. W. Grant	12,216		
Labour	A. R. Palmer	11,969		
Liberal	Anthony Stanley Richard Rundle	9,462		
Liberal	C. J. Barnes	7,777		
Communist	A. J. Banfield	749		
Homes before Roads	F. Beecham	738		
Homes before Roads	J. Lupton	656		
Union Movement	R. S. Prentice	235		
Turnout				
Conservative hold		Swing		
Conservative hold		Swing		
