= Cities of London and Westminster =

Cities of London and Westminster could refer to:

- Cities of London and Westminster (UK Parliament constituency), currently existing
- City of London and Westminster South (UK Parliament constituency), from 1974 to 1997
- Cities of London and Westminster (London County Council constituency)
- Westminster and the City of London (electoral division), for the Greater London Council
- City of London and Westminster South (electoral division), for the Greater London Council
