= 1973 Greater London Council election =

Local election in England

- 12 April 1973

92 councillors 47 seats needed for a majority
	First party	Second party	Third party
Leader	Reg Goodwin	Desmond Plummer	Stanley Rundle
Party	Labour	Conservative	Liberal
Leader's seat	Bermondsey	St Marylebone	Richmond
Seats won	58	32	2
Seat change	▲23	▼33	▲2
Popular vote	928,034	743,123	244,703
Percentage	47.4%	38.0%	12.5%
Swing	▲7.5%	▼12.6%	▲7.1%
- Results by electoral division
Leader before election
Desmond Plummer
Conservative
Leader after election
Reg Goodwin
Labour

The fourth election to the Greater London Council (GLC) was held on 12 April 1973. Labour won a large majority of 58 seats to 32 for the Conservatives; the Liberals also won their first two seats on the council.

== Electoral arrangements ==
As there had been a boundary commission report with new Parliamentary constituencies which coincided with the border of Greater London, the electoral system was changed (as had always been intended) so that the GLC was elected from single member electoral divisions which were identical with the Parliamentary constituencies.

Councillors were elected for a three-year term. This was extended for an extra year in 1976 when the electoral cycle was switched to four-yearly.

== Results ==
=== General election of councillors ===
The Labour Party won a majority of seats at the election.

With an electorate of 5,313,470, there was a turnout of 36.8%.

Among those who were first elected to the GLC in 1973 were Ken Livingstone (Labour, Lambeth, Norwood), later to lead it, Andrew McIntosh (Labour, Haringey, Tottenham) who was his brief moderate rival for the Labour leadership, and Serge Lourie (Labour, Havering, Hornchurch), who became a founder member of the SDP and leader of Richmond upon Thames London Borough Council in 2001.

Party	Votes			Seats			
Party	Number	%	+/-	Stood	Seats	%	+/-
Labour	928,034	47.4	▲7.5	92	58	63.0	▲23
Conservative	743,123	38.0	▼12.6	92	32	34.8	▼33
Liberal	244,703	12.5	▲7.1	60	2	2.2	▲2
Communist	11,954	0.6	▼1.2	28	0	0.0	Steady
National Front	9,536	0.5	New	6	0	0.0	Steady
Residents' or Ratepayers'	5,516	0.3	New	3	0	0.0	Steady
Independent	4,211	0.2	▼0.1	15	0	0.0	Steady
Action	3,063	0.2	▼0.4	6	0	0.0	Steady
National Independence	2,924	0.1	New	1	0	0.0	Steady
Ind. Conservative	2,393	0.1	New	2	0	0.0	Steady
Socialist (GB)	1,612	0.1	Steady	11	0	0.0	Steady
Independent Labour	227	0.0	New	1	0	0.0	Steady

=== Aldermanic election ===
In addition to the 92 elected councillors, there were fifteen aldermen elected by the council. Eight aldermen elected in 1970 continued to serve until 1976 and the eight elected in 1967 retired before the 1973 election. Seven aldermen were elected by the council on 4 May 1973 to serve until 1979.

Aldermen elected in 1973, to retire in 1979: (Note: The term was reduced to four years by the London Councillors Order 1976 and aldermen elected in 1973 served until 1977.)

Party	Alderman
Labour	Richard Collins
Labour	Maureen Harwood
Labour	Walter Kenneth Mansfield
Labour	Stanley Wilfred Mayne
Labour	Luke Patrick O'Connor
Labour	Oliver Stutchbury (Note: Resigned 2 September 1976)
Labour	John Golden Warren

The aldermen divided 9 Labour and 6 Conservative, so that Labour had 67 members to 38 for the Conservatives following the aldermanic election. It would be the final election of aldermen to the council, with those elected in 1970 and 1973 having their terms altered to all end in 1977.

== Constituency results ==
Members of the old council*

=== Barking ===
Barking
Party	Candidate	Votes	%	±%
Labour	John Benjamin Ward*	10,575	71.5	
Conservative	C A Pool	2,417	16.3	
Liberal	J D Tyrell	1,800	12.2	
Majority				
Turnout			29.7	
Turnout				
Labour win (new boundaries)				

Dagenham
Party	Candidate	Votes	%	±%
Labour	Robert John Crane*	13,753	72.3	
Conservative	T. A. Woodcock	2,149	11.3	
Liberal	George Daniel Poole	1,994	10.5	
Independent Labour	Vera W Cridland	564		
Communist	George Charles Wake	558		
Majority				
Turnout			27.4	
Labour win (new seat)				

=== Barnet ===
Chipping Barnet
Party	Candidate	Votes	%	±%
Conservative	Reginald Marks*	10,753	50.0	
Labour	H. Sprague	6,035	28.0	
Liberal	Margaret Gelling Snow	4,727	22.0	
Majority				
Turnout			37.9	

Finchley
Party	Candidate	Votes	%	±%
Conservative	Jean Leslie Scott*	8,008	48.9	
Labour	Albert Edward Tomlinson	5,183	31.7	
Liberal	Leonard W. Watkins	3,175	19.4	
Majority				
Turnout			37.9	

Hendon North
Party	Candidate	Votes	%	±%
Labour	Frank Arthur Cooper	8,925	44.2	
Conservative	Rita Maisie Levy*	8,180	40.5	
Liberal	David Hugh Edwards	3,079	15.3	
Majority				
Turnout			40.7	

Hendon South
Party	Candidate	Votes	%	±%
Conservative	Peter Blair Black*	8,229	41.0	
Labour	Mildred Gordon	6,874	34.2	
Liberal	Percy Walter Meyer	4,992	24.8	
Majority				
Turnout			38.1	

=== Bexley ===
Bexleyheath
Party	Candidate	Votes	%	±%
Conservative	Victor Rae Muske Langton*	10,025	43.1	
Labour	Stanley Wilfred Mayne	8,924	38.4	
Liberal	Wilfrid Pickard	4,297	18.5	
Majority				
Turnout			45.6	

Erith & Crayford
Party	Candidate	Votes	%	±%
Labour	Francis William Archer	14,168	61.9	
Conservative	E. D. Josiffe	8,717	38.1	
Majority				
Turnout			38.5	

Sidcup
Party	Candidate	Votes	%	±%
Conservative	Douglas Melville Fielding*	10,844	48.6	
Labour	John Francis Spellar	7,217	32.3	
Liberal	L. W. Rogers	4,276	19.1	
Majority				
Turnout			45.2	

=== Brent ===
Brent East
Party	Candidate	Votes	%	±%
Labour	Norman Howard	14,123	61.6	
Conservative	Alfred Abram Berney*	7,232	31.5	
Liberal	M. H. Habib	1,115	4.9	
Action	Raymond J Noble	467	2.0	
Majority				
Turnout			35.7	

Brent North
Party	Candidate	Votes	%	±%
Conservative	Alan Hardy*	14,941	49.3	
Labour	Maurice Howard Rosen	10,143	33.4	
Liberal	G. Phelps	5,262	17.3	
Majority				
Turnout			42.1	

Brent South
Party	Candidate	Votes	%	±%
Labour	Illtyd Harrington*	14,190	66.5	
Conservative	Ruby Georgina Nancy Taylor*	6,635	31.1	
Communist	Leslie George Burt	503	2.4	
Majority				
Turnout			34.4	

=== Bromley ===
Beckenham
Party	Candidate	Votes	%	±%
Conservative	Frank Willie Smith*	11,142	49.6	
Labour	Nicholas John Sharp	6,357	28.3	
Liberal	D. A. Rowe	4,975	22.1	
Majority				
Turnout			37.6	

Chislehurst
Party	Candidate	Votes	%	±%
Conservative	Joan Kathleen Wykes	10,977	44.3	
Labour	Walter Kenneth Mansfield	10,938	44.1	
Liberal	John R. Hassall	2,864	11.6	
Majority				
Turnout			46.3	

Orpington
Party	Candidate	Votes	%	±%
Conservative	Jean Tatham	15,496	44.3	
Liberal	John William Cook	13,169	37.7	
Labour	Christopher Howes	6,276	18.0	
Majority				
Turnout			53.6	

Ravensbourne
Party	Candidate	Votes	%	±%
Conservative	David Anthony Harris*	10,012	56.0	
Liberal	Mrs M. M. Coulson	4,124	23.1	
Labour	A. W. Wright	3,534	19.8	
Communist	G. Felton	202	1.1	
Majority				
Turnout			36.7	

=== Camden ===
Hampstead
Party	Candidate	Votes	%	±%
Labour	Enid Barbara Wistrich	12,268	48.0	
Conservative	I. Clarke	9,823	38.4	
Liberal	Raymond Arthur Philip Benad	2,824	11.0	
Communist	R. Champion	466		
Socialist (GB)	L. J. Cox	191		
Majority				
Turnout				

Holborn & St Pancras South
Party	Candidate	Votes	%	±%
Labour	Alexander John Kazantzis*	7,437	60.6	
Conservative	David P Weeks	3,520	28.7	
Liberal	A. Elithorn	1,085	8.8	
Socialist (GB)	Mrs D. M. Davies	99		
Independent	Noel S. Fierz	72		
Independent	P. Goulstone	60		
Majority				
Turnout			30.9	

- Fierz - Anti-Redevelopment
- Goulstone - Great Joint Happiness Homes for All

St Pancras North
Party	Candidate	Votes	%	±%
Labour	Rose Hacker	9,915	67.7	
Conservative	Nicholas J Bennett	4,226	28.9	
Communist	V. A. Heath	497	3.4	
Majority				
Turnout			35.1	

=== Croydon ===
Croydon Central
Party	Candidate	Votes	%	±%
Labour	David Frank White	13,029	46.3	
Conservative	Sonia Copland	10,914	38.8	
Liberal	Roy A Lightwing	3,965	14.1	
Independent	J T E A Waddell	241	0.8	
Majority				
Turnout				

Croydon North East
Party	Candidate	Votes	%	±%
Labour	David Howard Simpson	10,340	43.8	
Conservative	Gladys Emma Morgan*	10,329	43.8	
Liberal	Brian F Steggles	2,940	12.4	
Majority				
Turnout			40.2	

Croydon North West
Party	Candidate	Votes	%	±%
Labour	Dudley Eric Reynolds Barker	9,458	44.0	
Conservative	Stephen James Stewart*	8,965	41.7	
Liberal	Leo C. E. Held	3,074	14.3	
Majority				
Turnout			38.9	

Croydon South
Party	Candidate	Votes	%	±%
Conservative	Geoffrey Weston Aplin*	14,885	61.5	
Liberal	Jean Pearson Coleman	6,186	25.6	
Labour	Mrs Mary E. Curson	2,880	11.9	
Ratepayers	S. B. Stray	234	1.0	
Majority				
Turnout			40.3	

=== Ealing ===
Acton
Party	Candidate	Votes	%	±%
Conservative	John Chaytor Dobson*	10,576	45.7	
Labour	Oliver Piers Stutchbury	9,665	41.7	
Liberal	N. J. Reed	2,616	11.3	
Communist	H. A. Tank	303	1.3	
Majority				
Turnout			40.7	

Ealing North
Party	Candidate	Votes	%	±%
Labour	David Michael Mason	19,013	54.9	
Conservative	Michael William Walter Farrow*	15,361	45.1	
Majority				
Turnout			47.4	

Southall
Party	Candidate	Votes	%	±%
Labour	Yvonne Sieve	14,442	59.4	
Conservative	Robert Charles Patten	9,876	40.6	
Majority				
Turnout			35.0	

=== Enfield ===
Edmonton
Party	Candidate	Votes	%	±%
Labour	Bernard Stephen Mason	11,085	53.6	
Conservative	John William Victor Attwood	7,256	35.1	
Liberal	Ralph J R Scott	1,870	9.1	
Action	Martin F. Moloney	457	2.2	
Majority				
Turnout				

Enfield North
Party	Candidate	Votes	%	±%
Labour	John Howard White	11,202	37.1	
Liberal	L Eric L Ridge	11,062	36.6	
Conservative	Bryan Michael Deece Cassidy	6,725	22.3	
National Front	Kenneth Thomas Robinson	1,204	4.0	
Majority				
Turnout			44.6	

Southgate
Party	Candidate	Votes	%	±%
Conservative	Thomas Broughton Mitcheson*	15,857	58.5	
Liberal	Dennis Alan Coberman	5,896	21.8	
Labour	B M Barbuk	5,342	19.7	
Majority				
Turnout			38.4	

=== Greenwich ===
Greenwich
Party	Candidate	Votes	%	±%
Labour	Peggy Arline Middleton*	13,953	68.4	
Conservative	J A B Kind	6,440	31.6	
Majority				
Turnout			38.9	

Woolwich East
Party	Candidate	Votes	%	±%
Labour	Mair Eluned Garside*	11,880	67.2	
Conservative	A R Dix	3,164	17.9	
Liberal	Robert H Smith	1,860	10.5	
Action	J P Sibley	442		
Communist	Arthur A R Curtis	332		
Majority				
Turnout			34.8	

Woolwich West
Party	Candidate	Votes	%	±%
Labour	Margaret Rees	13,466		
Conservative	Mrs Wendy Mitchell	9,867		
Liberal	James Douglas Eagle	2,401		
Majority				
Turnout				

=== Hackney ===
Hackney Central
Party	Candidate	Votes	%	±%
Labour	Ellis Simon Hillman*	9,265		
Conservative	Stanley J. Sorrell	1,770		
Independent	O. Hales	266		
Majority				
Turnout				

Hackney North & Stoke Newington
Party	Candidate	Votes	%	±%
Labour	David Thomas Pitt*	6,529		
Conservative	Leslie R. House	2,524		
Communist	Monty Goldman	621		
Socialist (GB)	J. Carter	250		
Majority				
Turnout				

Hackney South & Shoreditch
Party	Candidate	Votes	%	±%
Labour	Irene Chaplin	8,473		
Conservative	E. Laws	1,586		
Independent	V. A. C. Curtis	325		
Action	D. H. England	290		
Independent	B. M. Lampert	154		
Majority				
Turnout				

Curtis - Parent Action Group for Education

=== Hammersmith ===
Fulham
Party	Candidate	Votes	%	±%
Labour	Anthony Louis Banks*	15,176		
Conservative	A F E Johnson	9,926		
Liberal	Derek J P Honeygold	2,002		
Independent	M S Ashworth	202		
Majority				
Turnout				

Ashworth - Centre Party

Hammersmith North
Party	Candidate	Votes	%	±%
Labour	Iris Mary Caroline Bonham*	13,529		
Conservative	William Christopher Smith	7,031		
Liberal	Mrs F M Abrahams	2,095		
Majority				
Turnout				

=== Haringey ===
Hornsey
Party	Candidate	Votes	%	±%
Conservative	Lawrence Arthur Bains*	10,361		
Labour	John Golden Warren	10,078		
Liberal	Patrick William O'Brien	3,450		
Communist	B P Van den Berg	483		
Socialist (GB)	D J Porter	144		
Majority				
Turnout				

Tottenham
Party	Candidate	Votes	%	±%
Labour	Andrew Robert McIntosh	8,043		
Conservative	John Antony Croft	3,360		
National Independence	Michael Paul Coney	2,924		
Socialist (GB)	Mrs A Young	109		
Majority				
Turnout				

Wood Green
Party	Candidate	Votes	%	±%
Labour	Stephen Michael Alan Haseler	10,305		
Conservative	Rodney Charles Gent	5,862		
Majority				
Turnout				

=== Harrow ===
Harrow Central
Party	Candidate	Votes	%	±%
Conservative	William Sydney Clack*	7,812		
Labour	Alfred J. Lovell	7,379		
Liberal	N. G. Marcus	2,666		
National Front	R. Franklin	1,361		
Majority				
Turnout				

Harrow East
Party	Candidate	Votes	%	±%
Conservative	Harold Trevor Mote*	10,432		
Labour	J. C. Powell	10,217		
Communist	Reginald A. Ward	460		
Majority				
Turnout				

Harrow West
Party	Candidate	Votes	%	±%
Conservative	Horace Walter Cutler	12,498		
Labour	N. A. Hyman	5,407		
Liberal	Henry Young	5,230		
Action	R. C. Ramage	947		
Majority				
Turnout				

=== Havering ===
Hornchurch
Party	Candidate	Votes	%	±%
Labour	Alexander Serge Lourie	10,714		
Conservative	Ronald Dennis Mitchell	7,114		
Liberal	Brian George McCarthy	3,666		
Non-Party Conservationist	Benjamin Percy-Davis	1,908		
Majority				
Turnout				

Romford
Party	Candidate	Votes	%	±%
Conservative	Bernard Brook-Partridge	9,697		
Labour	K. St. J. D'Cruze	7,219		
Liberal	Terry Edward Hurlstone	4,693		
Communist	Colin R Harper	347		
Majority				
Turnout				

Upminster
Party	Candidate	Votes	%	±%
Conservative	Shelagh Marjorie Roberts*	11,425		
Labour	Maureen Harwood	10,687		
Liberal	R. E. Jenking	4,408		
Majority				
Turnout				

=== Hillingdon ===
Hayes & Harlington
Party	Candidate	Votes	%	±%
Labour	Peter Frank Norman Russell	13,576		
Conservative	Robert Gurth Hughes	5,637		
National Front	John Stanley Fairhurst	1,821		
Communist	Peter R Pink	317		
Majority				
Turnout				

Ruislip-Northwood
Party	Candidate	Votes	%	±%
Conservative	Bernard Joseph Brown*	13,263		
Labour	John S Gallagher	6,395		
Liberal	George Raymond Stephenson	5,108		
Majority				
Turnout				

Uxbridge
Party	Candidate	Votes	%	±%
Conservative	James Anthony Lemkin	11,540		
Labour	Cyril Shaw	10,571		
Liberal	Brian Outhwaite	4,129		
Action	M. N. Griffin	460		
Majority				
Turnout				

=== Hounslow ===
Brentford & Isleworth
Party	Candidate	Votes	%	±%
Labour	James Daly	17,428		
Conservative	Andrew Jardine*	15,131		
Majority				
Turnout				

Feltham & Heston
Party	Candidate	Votes	%	±%
Labour	Douglas Eden	16,529		
Conservative	Dyas Cyril Loftus Usher*	9,173		
National Front	Josephine Mary Reid	3,332		
Communist	P Rhodes	379		
Majority				
Turnout				

=== Islington ===
Islington Central
Party	Candidate	Votes	%	±%
Labour	Evelyn Joyce Denington	8,996		
Conservative	Mrs B A Devonald-Lewis	2,936		
Liberal	Alan A S Butt Philip	2,139		
Majority				
Turnout				

Islington North
Party	Candidate	Votes	%	±%
Labour	Louis Wolfgang Bondy*	7,463		
Conservative	Timothy Stephen Kenneth Yeo	2,798		
Socialist (GB)	A J L Buick	284		
Majority				
Turnout				

Islington South & Finsbury
Party	Candidate	Votes	%	±%
Labour	Arthur Ernest Wicks*	9,850		
Conservative	S G Parker	2,969		
Communist	Marie Betteridge	538		
Majority				
Turnout				

=== Kensington and Chelsea ===
Chelsea
Party	Candidate	Votes	%	±%
Conservative	William Archibald Ottley Juxon Bell*	12,811		
Labour	S. H. Shapiro	4,531		
Majority				
Turnout				

Kensington
Party	Candidate	Votes	%	±%
Conservative	Robert Louis Vigars	9,388		
Labour	D. J. Scott	8,736		
Liberal	K. Rason	2,855		
Communist	Edward S. Adams	366		
Majority				
Turnout				

=== Kingston upon Thames ===
Kingston upon Thames
Party	Candidate	Votes	%	±%
Conservative	Sydney William Leonard Ripley*	12,145		
Labour	Peter W Lane	6,855		
Liberal	Mrs L F Wells	4,224		
Majority				
Turnout				

Surbiton
Party	Candidate	Votes	%	±%
Conservative	Geoffrey John David Seaton*	8,821		
Labour	Robert R G Viner	5,972		
Liberal	T. A. Channings	3,966		
Independent	Edgar Scruby	303		
Majority				
Turnout				

Scruby - Surbiton Residents & Ratepayers

=== Lambeth ===
Lambeth Central
Party	Candidate	Votes	%	±%
Labour	Anna Lloyd Grieves*	9,231		
Conservative	John Laurence Pritchard	2,707		
Liberal	J. T. Kane	1,026		
Independent	C. G. Jackson	143		
Socialist (GB)	H. G. Baldwin	115		
Independent	G. W. Solomon	103		
Majority				
Turnout				

- Jackson - Anti-Motorway, Support Community Involvement in Planning
- Solomon - Lambeth Residents for Democratic Local Government

Norwood
Party	Candidate	Votes	%	±%
Labour	Kenneth Robert Livingstone	11,622		
Conservative	Michael Peter Russell Malynn*	8,007		
Liberal	Michael Frederick Drake	1,819		
Socialist (GB)	H. Young	95		
Majority				
Turnout				

Streatham
Party	Candidate	Votes	%	±%
Conservative	Diana Elizabeth Geddes*	10,492		
Labour	Hugh H. Walker	9,426		
Liberal	Allan Mitchell	2,114		
Socialist (GB)	F. W. Simkins	120		
Independent	William George Boaks	57		
Majority				
Turnout				

Boaks - Air Road Public Safety White Resident

Vauxhall
Party	Candidate	Votes	%	±%
Labour	Ewan Geddes Carr*	10,821		
Conservative	Peter James Bottomley	3,396		
Communist	J. A. Henry	365		
Socialist (GB)	M. E. Sansum	121		
Majority				
Turnout				

=== Lewisham ===
Deptford
Party	Candidate	Votes	%	±%
Labour	David Walter Chalkley*	13,159		
Conservative	I M Andrews	4,805		
Liberal	Eric Reginald Lubbock	1,747		
Majority				
Turnout				

Lewisham East
Party	Candidate	Votes	%	±%
Labour	John Charles Henry*	16,721		
Conservative	T M Aitken	8,913		
Liberal	L Spicer	4,182		
Communist	Michael Power	461		
Majority				
Turnout				

Lewisham West
Party	Candidate	Votes	%	±%
Labour	William Colbert Simson	13,930		
Conservative	Michael John Wheeler	11,667		
Communist	M H Robinson	621		
Majority				
Turnout				

=== Merton ===
Mitcham & Morden
Party	Candidate	Votes	%	±%
Labour	Anthony Robert Judge	14,628		
Conservative	Miss J R Yarwood	10,060		
Independent	Grace Louisa Giddins	875		
Communist	Sidney Ernest French	485		
Majority				
Turnout				

Wimbledon
Party	Candidate	Votes	%	±%
Conservative	Stanley Charles Bolton*	14,506		
Labour	Keith Bill	8,389		
Liberal	Peter Charles Spratling	6,419		
Majority				
Turnout				

=== Newham ===
Newham North East
Party	Candidate	Votes	%	±%
Labour	Thomas Alfred Jenkinson	9,183	52.9	
Independent	R. F. C. Ower	5,110	29.5	
Conservative	Timothy John Stroud	2,828	16.3	
Independent Labour	M. Flaherty	227	1.3	
Majority		4,073	23.4	
Turnout			26.1	

Ower - Ratepayers & Citizens Association

Newham North West
Party	Candidate	Votes	%	±%
Labour	Arthur Frank George Edwards*	8,031	80.5	
Conservative	Samuel M Swerling	1,951	19.5	
Majority		6,080	61.0	
Turnout			18.9	

Newham South
Party	Candidate	Votes	%	±%
Labour	Edward Percy Bell*	10,024	82.0	
Conservative	John Johnston	1,579	12.9	
Communist	R. A. Offley	623	5.1	
Majority		8,445	69.1	
Turnout			21.3	

=== Redbridge ===
Ilford North
Party	Candidate	Votes	%	±%
Labour	Timothy J. Ridoutt	9,999		
Conservative	Neil Gordon Thorne*	9,537		
Liberal	Gareth Laurence Philip Wilson	4,410		
Majority				
Turnout				

Ilford South
Party	Candidate	Votes	%	±%
Labour	Dennis Annesley Carradice	9,678		
Conservative	P A Chalkley	8,556		
Liberal	Gerald Leslie Wilson	3,232		
Communist	B S Wallington	294		
Majority				
Turnout				

Wanstead & Woodford
Party	Candidate	Votes	%	±%
Conservative	Robert Mitchell*	11,439		
Labour	G J Clark	4,176		
Liberal	David John Gilby	3,411		
Majority				
Turnout				

=== Richmond upon Thames ===
Richmond
Party	Candidate	Votes	%	±%
Liberal	Anthony Stanley Richard Rundle	12,160	44.2	
Conservative	B. S. Feldman	9,312	33.8	
Labour	Kenneth L Elmes	5,796	21.1	
Communist	Ms E. Tendler	250	0.9	
Majority				
Turnout		27,518		

Twickenham
Party	Candidate	Votes	%	±%
Conservative	George William Tremlett	13,765		
Labour	P. T. Z. Goldring	12,386		
Liberal	Cyril J. Barnes	5,625		
Majority				
Turnout				

=== Southwark ===
Bermondsey
Party	Candidate	Votes	%	±%
Labour	Reginald Eustace Goodwin	14,617		
Conservative	Alexander J Padmore	1,480		
National Front	R. S. Pritchard	992		
Majority				
Turnout				

Dulwich
Party	Candidate	Votes	%	±%
Labour	Richard Andrew Balfe	14,184		
Conservative	A. P. Berend	9,222		
Liberal	C. M. Hall	2,853		
Communist	Eric L. Hodson	431		
Majority				
Turnout				

Peckham
Party	Candidate	Votes	%	±%
Labour	Harvey W. Hinds*	14,134		
Conservative	Nicholas Brian Baker	2,214		
Majority				
Turnout				

=== Sutton ===
Carshalton
Party	Candidate	Votes	%	±%
Labour	Phillip John Bassett	11,611		
Conservative	George Frederick Everitt*	11,239		
Liberal	C Clark	7,094		
Majority				
Turnout				

Sutton and Cheam
Party	Candidate	Votes	%	±%
Liberal	Ruth Mary Shaw	15,515	53.3	
Conservative	Alan Horace Lewis Leach	10,367	35.6	
Labour	Peter L Spalding	3,209	11.0	
Majority		5,148	17.7	
Turnout		2,9091		

=== Tower Hamlets ===
Bethnal Green and Bow
Party	Candidate	Votes	%	±%
Labour	Ernest Ashley Bramall	10,802		
Conservative	L. E. Smith	899		
Independent	J. P. Collins	467		
Majority				
Turnout				

Stepney & Poplar
Party	Candidate	Votes	%	±%
Labour	John Patrick Branagan	13,062		
Conservative	P. E. Bridge	782		
Communist	Max Samuel Levitas	703		
Majority				
Turnout				

=== Waltham Forest ===
Chingford
Party	Candidate	Votes	%	±%
Conservative	Richard Maddock Brew*	9,905		
Labour	F F Land	7,520		
Liberal	Barry R Woodward	5,685		
Majority				
Turnout				

Leyton
Party	Candidate	Votes	%	±%
Labour	John James Walsh	11,240		
Conservative	G P Waller	6,485		
Communist	John Arthur Courcouf	646		
Majority				
Turnout				

Walthamstow
Party	Candidate	Votes	%	±%
Labour	Robin Ainsworth Raine Young	9,545		
Conservative	Phillip Charles Desmond Williams*	4,381		
Liberal	Martin D Silverston	2,724		
Majority				
Turnout				

=== Wandsworth ===
Battersea North
Party	Candidate	Votes	%	±%
Labour	Gladys Felicia Dimson*	11,542		
Conservative	D. J. Wedgwood	3,407		
Majority				
Turnout				

Battersea South
Party	Candidate	Votes	%	±%
Labour	Stephen Robert Hatch	8,601		
Conservative	Lynda Chalker	6,224		
Liberal	Cecil Victor Gittins	1,559		
National Front	Tom Lamb	826		
Majority				
Turnout				

Putney
Party	Candidate	Votes	%	±%
Labour	Ethel Marie Jenkins*	15,449		
Conservative	Margaret Williams	11,282		
Liberal	Walter V Hain	3,649		
Communist	David John Welsh	375		
Majority				
Turnout				

Tooting
Party	Candidate	Votes	%	±%
Labour	Lilias Girdwood Gillies	11,783		
Conservative	N. R. Berry	6,162		
Communist	Robert E. Lewis	417		
Majority				
Turnout				

=== Westminster and the City of London ===
City of London & Westminster South
Party	Candidate	Votes	%	±%
Conservative	Mervyn Nelson Scorgie*	9,152		
Labour	Philip John Turner	4,993		
Liberal	R. W. Jones	4,993		
Independent	A Wilson	195		
Independent	P.A. Clifford	184		
Majority				
Turnout				

Wilson - Anti-Mass Redevelopment

Paddington
Party	Candidate	Votes	%	±%
Labour	Jean Merriton	11,085		
Conservative	Herbert Henry Sandford	7,101		
Liberal	John H. Gover	1,609		
Independent	D. J. B. Morgan	172		
Majority				
Turnout				

St Marylebone
Party	Candidate	Votes	%	±%
Conservative	Arthur Desmond Herne Plummer*	7,930		
Labour	Jeremy Gordon	4,971		
Unofficial Conservative	P. Darvas	485		
Communist	L. R. Temple	276		
Socialist (GB)	R. A. Weidberg	84		
Majority				
Turnout				

== By-elections 1973–1977 ==
The first by-election of the term was caused by the court voiding the election in Croydon North East (see Morgan v Simpson). The former Conservative member Billie Morgan regained the seat she had narrowly lost in Croydon North East on 5 September 1974. Labour retained seats in Greenwich on 24 October 1974 and Dagenham on 30 January 1975 caused by the deaths of sitting councillors. The Conservatives kept their seat in Finchley on 15 May 1975 caused by the resignation of Roland Freeman and St Marylebone on 8 April 1976 caused by the resignation of former GLC leader Desmond Plummer.

There was one aldermanic by-election caused by the resignation of Oliver Piers Stutchbury (Labour) in 1976. Alfred Frederick Joseph Chorley (Labour) was elected by the council on 21 September 1976, to serve until 1977. (Note: Stutchbury had been elected by the council in 1973 to serve until 1979 but the term was shortened to end in 1977 by the London Councillors Order 1976)
