= 1964 Greater London Council election =

Local election in England

- 9 April 1964

100 councillors 51 seats needed for a majority
	First party	Second party
Leader	Bill Fiske	Percy Rugg
Party	Labour	Conservative
Leader since	1964	1964
Leader's seat	Havering	Kensington and Chelsea
Seats won	64	36
Popular vote	1,063,390	956,543
Percentage	44.6%	40.1%
Leader after election
Bill Fiske
Labour Party

The first election to the Greater London Council (GLC) was held on 9 April 1964.

== Background ==
The election happened at a time of very high political tension, with a general election due in a few months. The GLC did not come into its powers until 1 April 1965, but spent the first year setting up its committee structure and arranging with its predecessor authorities to take over.

== Electoral arrangements ==
New constituencies to be used for elections to Parliament and also for elections to the GLC had not yet been settled, so the London boroughs were used as multi-member 'first past the post' electoral areas. Westminster was joined with the City of London for this purpose. Each electoral area returned between 2 and 4 councillors.

The first election to the Greater London Council took place a month before the first election to the 32 London borough councils on 7 May 1964.

== Results ==
=== General election of councillors ===
The Labour Party won a majority of seats at the election.

When the GLC was being planned, it was expected to produce Conservative majorities. However, many suburban Conservative-voting areas had successfully campaigned to be excluded from the Greater London boundaries.

The large constituencies, where the winner took all, exaggerated Labour's win in votes into a near two-to-one lead in terms of seats. It also made it extremely difficult for the Liberal Party to win any seats.

With an electorate of 5,466,756, there was a turnout of 44.2%. Labour did particularly well to win Bexley and Havering, but performed poorly in Enfield which they might have expected to win. In Tower Hamlets, the Communist Party of Great Britain came in as runners-up with 8% of the vote.

Party	Votes			Seats	
Party	Number	%	Stood	Seats	%
Labour	1,063,390	44.6	100	64	64.0
Conservative	956,543	40.1	100	36	36.0
Liberal	238,967	10.0	86	0	0.0
Communist	90,779	3.8	36	0	0.0
Independent	19,983	0.9	9	0	0.0
Ratepayers	5,858	0.3	3	0	0.0
Christian Independent	2,895	0.1	1	0	0.0
New Liberal	2,474	0.1	3	0	0.0
Union Movement	2,353	0.1	2	0	0.0

=== Aldermanic election ===
In addition to the one hundred councillors, there were sixteen aldermen elected by the council. The eight aldermen with the fewest votes were elected to serve until 1967 and the other eight until 1970. The aldermen were elected on 27 April 1964.

Aldermen elected in 1964, to retire in 1967:

Party	Alderman
Labour	Charles Christopher
Labour	Arthur Edwards
Conservative	Andrew Jardine
Conservative	Albert Knowlden
Labour	Terence McMillan
Conservative	John Mason
Labour	Bernard Rockman
Labour	Donald Soper (Note: Resigned 13 May 1965)

Aldermen elected in 1964, to retire in 1970:

Party	Alderman
Labour	Frank Banfield (Note: Died 31 March 1970)
Conservative	Francis Bennett
Labour	Audrey Callaghan
Labour	Edward Castle
Labour	Alfred Chorley
Labour	Herbert Ferguson
Conservative	Leslie Freeman
Labour	Edgar Garton

The aldermen divided 11 to Labour and 5 to the Conservatives, and so the overall strength of the parties on the council was 75 Labour to 41 Conservatives after the aldermanic election.

== Constituency results ==
Results by electoral area

=== Barking ===
Barking (2)
Party	Candidate	Votes	%	±%
Labour	Charles Prendergast	25,380		
Labour	Maud Ball	23,803		
Conservative	R. C. Denney	7,653		
Conservative	C. A. Pool	7,547		
Liberal	Hubert Herbert Creemer Blake	4,625		
Liberal	J. D. Tyrrell	3,824		
Communist	K. Halpin	1,385		
Turnout				
Labour win (new seat)				
Labour win (new seat)				

=== Barnet ===
Barnet (4)
Party	Candidate	Votes	%	±%
Conservative	Peter Blair Black			
Conservative	Jean Leslie Scott			
Conservative	Sir Joseph Henry Haygarth			
Conservative	Reginald Marks			
Labour	N Birch			
Labour	Mrs BR Scharf			
Labour	CHF Reynolds			
Labour	FB Groves			
Liberal	JW Webb			
Liberal	J. Murray Medway			
Liberal	Peter Hasler Billeness			
Liberal	OC Williams			
Communist	RT Gooding			
Communist	JW Pinder			
Turnout			53.8	
Conservative win (new seat)				
Conservative win (new seat)				
Conservative win (new seat)				
Conservative win (new seat)				

=== Bexley ===
Bexley (3)
Party	Candidate	Votes	%	±%
Labour	Edwin Furness	41,300		
Labour	John Nicoll Powrie	39,079		
Labour	Robin Beauchamp Thompson	37,314		
Conservative	Douglas Melville Fielding	33,958		
Conservative	A. F. Cobbold	33,906		
Conservative	R. J. F. Monk	31,939		
Liberal	R. J. Marsh	7,435		
Liberal	R. H. A. Saunders	6,770		
Liberal	C. E. Wright	5,991		
Communist	L. H. Smith	2,929		
Turnout				
Labour win (new seat)				
Labour win (new seat)				
Labour win (new seat)				

=== Brent ===
Brent (4)
Party	Candidate	Votes	%	±%
Labour	Muriel Rose Forbes	46,786		
Labour	Peter Otwell	46,307		
Labour	Illtyd Harrington	46,284		
Labour	Frank Towell	45,552		
Conservative	Ruby Georgina Nancy Taylor	38,500		
Conservative	C. H. Ansted	38,221		
Conservative	H. J. C. Faulkner	38,079		
Conservative	Alfred Abram Berney	37,892		
Liberal	E. Baker	11,180		
Liberal	J. E. C. Perry	10,727		
Liberal	G. Phelps	10,416		
Liberal	M. R. Uziell-Hamilton	8,029		
Communist	M. E. Alcock	3,574		
Communist	L. G. Burt	2,722		
Turnout				
Labour win (new seat)				
Labour win (new seat)				
Labour win (new seat)				
Labour win (new seat)				

=== Bromley ===
Bromley (4)
Party	Candidate	Votes	%	±%
Conservative	Edith Gordon Beecher-Bryant			
Conservative	Victor Sidney Henry Mitchell			
Conservative	Benita Dorothy Barham			
Conservative	Robert Joseph Turner*			
Labour	CJ Christopher			
Labour	FFW Coates			
Liberal	Michael Alan Minter			
Liberal	Alfred Baldock Howard			
Liberal	Nicholas Dudley Murdoch McGeorge			
Labour	LM Moelwyn-Hughes			
Labour	GH Warrack			
Liberal	LD Ricketts			
Communist	CL Coleman			
Turnout			54.5	
Conservative win (new seat)				
Conservative win (new seat)				
Conservative win (new seat)				
Conservative win (new seat)				

=== Camden ===
Camden (3)
Party	Candidate	Votes	%	±%
Labour	Leila Campbell	38,198		
Labour	Louis Wolfgang Bondy	38,191		
Labour	Evelyn Joyce Denington	37,364		
Conservative	F. E. H. Bennett	30,096		
Conservative	Lena Moncrieff Townsend	28,723		
Conservative	Isita Clare Mansel	28,588		
Liberal	A. J. F. Macdonald	4,839		
Liberal	J. M. Arram	4,614		
Liberal	M. S. Watson	4,087		
Communist	J. Nicolson	2,875		
Independent	B. W. Haines	1,016		
Turnout				
Labour win (new seat)				
Labour win (new seat)				
Labour win (new seat)				

=== Croydon ===
Croydon (4)
Party	Candidate	Votes	%	±%
Conservative	John Leonard Aston			
Conservative	Geoffrey Weston Aplin			
Conservative	Paul Alexander Saunders			
Conservative	Keith Andrew Edwards			
Labour	Arthur George Edwards			
Labour	FT Cole			
Labour	JA Clinch			
Labour	S Sutcliffe			
Liberal	Ronald E J Banks			
Liberal	Mrs BM Bashford			
Liberal	LG Pine			
Liberal	RF Tapsell			
Communist	M Rapaport			
Independent	SB Stray			
Independent	Jesse T. E. A. Waddell			
Turnout				
Conservative win (new seat)				
Conservative win (new seat)				
Conservative win (new seat)				
Conservative win (new seat)				

=== Ealing ===
Ealing (4)
Party	Candidate	Votes	%	±%
Labour	Peter Ernest Anderson	50,949		
Labour	Christopher Thomas Higgins	49,655		
Labour	George Francis Palmer	49,304		
Labour	Ethel Winifred Jones	49,253		
Conservative	Lady Henniker-Heaton	45,688		
Conservative	J. H. Ward	43,971		
Conservative	E. L. Prodham	43,118		
Conservative	R. F. Tovell	42,894		
Liberal	H. C. N. Baylis	8,649		
Liberal	J. E. Elsom	8,272		
Liberal	S. E. Smith	7,448		
Liberal	J. A. Sullivan	7,299		
Independent	J. McConville	3,311		
Communist	H. A. Tank	3,137		
Turnout				
Labour win (new seat)				
Labour win (new seat)				
Labour win (new seat)				
Labour win (new seat)				

=== Enfield ===
Enfield (3)
Party	Candidate	Votes	%	±%
Conservative	Stanley Graham Rowlandson	37,527		
Conservative	Gordon Laurence Dixon	37,284		
Conservative	Thomas Broughton Mitcheson	36,947		
Labour	E. L. Mackenzie	36,576		
Labour	E. V. Gorton	35,260		
Labour	H. S. Newman	34,906		
Liberal	D. M. Gilbert	11,240		
Liberal	E. B. Pearce	10,782		
Liberal	R. F. Skinner	10,599		
Communist	R. A. Leeson	2,449		
Turnout				
Conservative win (new seat)				
Conservative win (new seat)				
Conservative win (new seat)				

=== Greenwich ===
Greenwich (3)
Party	Candidate	Votes	%	±%
Labour	Julia Ada Johnson	44,714		
Labour	John William Andrews	44,349		
Labour	James Young	42,621		
Conservative	U. V. Lister	25,358		
Conservative	W. S. Manners	25,104		
Conservative	L. J. Smith	24,851		
Communist	E. Halpin	3,786		
Independent	H. H. Wright	2,016		
Turnout				
Labour win (new seat)				
Labour win (new seat)				
Labour win (new seat)				

=== Hackney ===
Hackney (3)
Party	Candidate	Votes	%	±%
Labour	Ellis Simon Hillman	24,793		
Labour	David Thomas Pitt	24,281		
Labour	Arthur Ernest Wicks	24,037		
Conservative	O. S. Henriques	6,561		
Conservative	W. J. Hawkins	6,265		
Conservative	A. M. White	6,260		
Liberal	R. B. James	3,953		
Liberal	T. Keen	3,904		
Liberal	T. D. Gates	3,641		
Communist	M. Goldman	2,807		
Turnout				
Labour win (new seat)				
Labour win (new seat)				
Labour win (new seat)				

=== Hammersmith ===
Hammersmith (3)
Party	Candidate	Votes	%	±%
Labour	Richard Clive Edmonds	36,051		
Labour	Marjorie Eleanor McIntosh	35,406		
Labour	Jane Phillips	35,185		
Conservative	John Stewart Collins	21,135		
Conservative	Ann McVicker Forbes-Cockell	20,715		
Conservative	J. Graham	19,380		
Liberal	C. M. Hildred-Goode	2,055		
Liberal	D. Webb	1,966		
Liberal	F. C. Scrivener	1,892		
Communist	P. T. Robson	1,736		
Labour win (new seat)				
Labour win (new seat)				
Labour win (new seat)				

=== Haringey ===
Haringey (3)
Party	Candidate	Votes	%	±%
Labour	Annie Florence Remington	39,698		
Labour	Louis Albert Vitoria	39,412		
Labour	Gladys Felicia Dimson	39,412		
Conservative	A. G. Brown	31,284		
Conservative	H. H. Godwin-Monck	30,849		
Conservative	N. Muldoon	30,177		
Communist	E. L. Ramsay	5,612		
Labour win (new seat)				
Labour win (new seat)				
Labour win (new seat)				

=== Harrow ===
Harrow (3)
Party	Candidate	Votes	%	±%
Conservative	Horace Walter Cutler	37,895		
Conservative	Oliver John Galley	37,021		
Conservative	William Emlyn Jones	35,577		
Labour	A. J. Lovell	27,000		
Labour	T. T. Swan	25,995		
Labour	A. R. Judge	24,684		
Liberal	M. D. Colne	14,447		
Liberal	D. F. Joyner	13,333		
Liberal	C. M. Hawkings	13,151		
Communist	R. A. Ward	3,426		
Turnout				
Conservative win (new seat)				
Conservative win (new seat)				
Conservative win (new seat)				

=== Havering ===
Havering (3)
Party	Candidate	Votes	%	±%
Labour	William Geoffrey Fiske	36,280		
Labour	William Arthur Gillman	34,915		
Labour	Bertie Edwin Roycraft	32,150		
Conservative	N. L. Anfilogoff	29,590		
Conservative	Mrs E. H. Dean	29,394		
Conservative	E. T. Davies	28,835		
Liberal	D. M. Hardy	11,705		
Liberal	C. W. Brewster	10,437		
Liberal	G. M. Horey	8,930		
Communist	F. Barlow	4,000		
Turnout				
Labour win (new seat)				
Labour win (new seat)				
Labour win (new seat)				

=== Hillingdon ===
Hillingdon (3)
Party	Candidate	Votes	%	±%
Labour	William John Lipscombe	34,728		
Labour	Frank Herbert Rapley	33,216		
Labour	David John Davies	32,898		
Conservative	E. L. Ing	32,091		
Conservative	G. Corran	32,072		
Conservative	Leslie Freeman	31,715		
Liberal	S. H. Davidson	7,299		
Liberal	J. B. Leno	7,112		
Liberal	J. A. Friedlander	6,545		
Independent	T. H. Barnard	5,020		
Communist	F. Stanley	3,240		
Turnout				
Labour win (new seat)				
Labour win (new seat)				
Labour win (new seat)				

=== Hounslow ===
Hounslow (3)
Party	Candidate	Votes	%	±%
Labour	Jack Dunnett	40,684		
Labour	Ernest Kinghorn	38,028		
Labour	Frederick W. Powe	36,860		
Conservative	Geoffrey Chase-Gardener	32,044		
Conservative	Andrew Jardine	31,281		
Conservative	Dyas Cyril Loftus Usher	29,426		
Liberal	R. P. Power	7,457		
Liberal	G. C. Middleton	7,084		
Liberal	J. S. Probert	6,062		
Communist	F. Stanley	2,077		
Turnout				
Labour win (new seat)				
Labour win (new seat)				
Labour win (new seat)				

=== Islington ===
Islington (3)
Party	Candidate	Votes	%	±%
Labour	Edwin Bayliss	31,077		
Labour	Irene Chaplin	30,165		
Labour	Florence Evelyne Cayford	30,107		
Conservative	R. A. Baker	8,152		
Conservative	P. E. Postgate	7,811		
Conservative	A. Hardy	7,380		
New Liberal	F. C. Barrett	2,922		
Communist	J. F. Moss	2,309		
New Liberal	F. G. S. White	2,292		
Liberal	S. W. Applin	2,290		
New Liberal	A. E. Lomas	2,207		
Liberal	C. Simpson	1,956		
Liberal	A. F. Cook	1,675		
Independent	D. H. L. Chenappa	659		
Turnout				
Labour win (new seat)				
Labour win (new seat)				
Labour win (new seat)				

=== Kensington and Chelsea ===
Kensington and Chelsea (3)
Party	Candidate	Votes	%	±%
Conservative	Sir Percy Rugg	34,683		
Conservative	Robert Louis Vigars	34,130		
Conservative	Seton Forbes Cockell	34,114		
Labour	A. L. Grieves	15,824		
Labour	O. M. Wilson	15,598		
Labour	T. W. Ives	15,001		
Liberal	M. Neilson	5,352		
Liberal	P. C. Boucher	5,060		
Liberal	J. H. Crowhurst	4,981		
Communist	H. B. Collins	2,153		
Turnout				
Conservative win (new seat)				
Conservative win (new seat)				
Conservative win (new seat)				

=== Kingston upon Thames ===
Kingston upon Thames (2)
Party	Candidate	Votes	%	±%
Conservative	Sydney William Leonard Ripley	26,252		
Conservative	Geoffrey John David Seaton	25,868		
Labour	E. K. Leggett	16,411		
Labour	C. Lesser	16,068		
Liberal	J. P. Farmer	6,788		
Liberal	A. M. Hollis	6,705		
Communist	D. E. Wilson	1,039		
Union Movement	A. J. C. Murray	944		
Turnout				
Conservative win (new seat)				
Conservative win (new seat)				

=== Lambeth ===
Lambeth (4)
Party	Candidate	Votes	%	±%
Labour	Robert William George Humphreys	46,240		
Labour	Victor Mishcon	46,056		
Labour	Beatrice Serota	45,492		
Labour	Sidney Aubrey Melman	45,125		
Conservative	L. Iremonger	37,812		
Conservative	Gerard Folliott Vaughan	37,358		
Conservative	A. M. Tennant	37,122		
Conservative	I. N. Samuel	37,057		
Liberal	D. R. Chapman	4,860		
Liberal	W. B. Mattinson	4,606		
Liberal	J.H. Gardner	4,451		
Liberal	I. Shaw	4,116		
Communist	J. Lawrence	2,416		
Communist	T. Gorringe	2,052		
Independent	William George Boaks	1,282		
Independent	A. C. Osman	1,103		
Turnout				
Labour win (new seat)				
Labour win (new seat)				
Labour win (new seat)				
Labour win (new seat)				

=== Lewisham ===
Lewisham (4)
Party	Candidate	Votes	%	±%
Turnout				
	Labour win (new seat)			
	Labour win (new seat)			
	Labour win (new seat)			
	Labour win (new seat)			

=== Merton ===
Merton (2)
Party	Candidate	Votes	%	±%
Conservative	Thomas William Scott	29,920		
Conservative	Frederick William Walker	29,895		
Labour	C. M. Waugh	28,752		
Labour	J. T. Pyne	27,108		
Liberal	E. M. Morrison	6,753		
Liberal	J. S. Rowlinson	6,676		
Communist	S. E. French	1,552		
Union Movement	D. Wheeler	1,409		
Turnout				
Conservative win (new seat)				
Conservative win (new seat)				

=== Newham ===
Newham (3)
Party	Candidate	Votes	%	±%
Labour	Samuel Boyce	34,429		
Labour	Edward Percy Bell	33,568		
Labour	Arthur Frank George Edwards	30,674		
Liberal	D. A. S. Brooke	9,476		
Conservative	C. A. Rugg	7,616		
Conservative	B. C. Balcomb	7,155		
Conservative	W. C. Willis	6,717		
Liberal	E. Johnson	6,119		
Liberal	R. A. Savill	5,703		
Communist	J. A. Walker	2,757		
Turnout				
Labour win (new seat)				
Labour win (new seat)				
Labour win (new seat)				

=== Redbridge ===
Redbridge (3)
Party	Candidate	Votes	%	±%
Conservative	Robert Mitchell	37,601		
Conservative	Francis Herbert James	36,785		
Conservative	Anne Sylvia Terry	36,259		
Labour	L. Fallaize	24,463		
Labour	A. F. J. Chorley	23,205		
Labour	A. E. O'Connor	22,440		
Liberal	G. S. Bellamy	17,901		
Liberal	K. H. N. Ives	17,622		
Liberal	D. F. Murphy	17,487		
Communist	P. J. Devine	3,885		
Turnout				
Conservative win (new seat)				
Conservative win (new seat)				
Conservative win (new seat)				

=== Richmond upon Thames ===
Richmond upon Thames (2)
Party	Candidate	Votes	%	±%
Conservative	Frederick Denis Christian	34,259		
Conservative	Montague William Garrett	34,029		
Labour	G. H. Loman	19,649		
Labour	T. R. Starr	19,557		
Liberal	D. V. G. Feltham	12,379		
Liberal	L. Worth	11,205		
Communist	A. J. Banfield	1,947		
Conservative win (new seat)				
Conservative win (new seat)				

=== Southwark ===
Southwark (4)
Party	Candidate	Votes	%	±%
Labour	Reginald Eustace Goodwin	49,518		
Labour	Henry George Lamborn	49,480		
Labour	Edgar Ernest Reed	48,471		
Labour	Albert Edward Samuels	47,177		
Conservative	Toby Francis Henry Jessel	18,333		
Conservative	J. A. Prichard	17,568		
Conservative	A. P. R. Noble	17,401		
Conservative	J. G. L. M. Porter	17,148		
Communist	S. P. Bent	4,311		
Turnout				
Labour win (new seat)				
Labour win (new seat)				
Labour win (new seat)				
Labour win (new seat)				

=== Sutton ===
Sutton (2)
Party	Candidate	Votes	%	±%
Conservative	George Frederick Everitt	30,393		
Conservative	Frederick William Thompson	28,979		
Labour	P. J. Bassett	19,023		
Labour	H. Ferguson	18,129		
Liberal	J. D. Ross	7,548		
Liberal	G. R. Watkin	6,787		
Communist	A. T. Goddard	1,880		
Turnout				
Conservative win (new seat)				
Conservative win (new seat)				

=== Tower Hamlets ===
Tower Hamlets (2)
Party	Candidate	Votes	%	±%
Labour	John Patrick Branagan	25,350		
Labour	Ernest Ashley Bramall	24,488		
Communist	Solly Kaye	2,618		
Liberal	S. H. Woodham	2,179		
Liberal	J. W. Parton	2,133		
Conservative	A. J. Lawrence	2,113		
Conservative	B. Hawley	1,959		
Turnout				
Labour win (new seat)				
Labour win (new seat)				

=== Waltham Forest ===
Waltham Forest (3)
Party	Candidate	Votes	%	±%
Labour	James Albert Edward Collins	35,338		
Labour	Betty Kathleen Lowton	33,299		
Labour	Mavis Joan Webster	31,872		
Conservative	M. J. Harvey	22,980		
Conservative	J. Gordon	22,158		
Conservative	G. W. Mason	21,113		
Ratepayers	W. J. Bowstead	6,624		
Liberal	J. M. Bishop	5,995		
Ratepayers	L. E. Norman	5,557		
Ratepayers	T. H. Oakman	5,393		
Liberal	W. T. Neilson-Hansen	4,944		
Liberal	W. V. E. Seymer	4,748		
Communist	D. J. Solomons	1,289		
Turnout				
Labour win (new seat)				
Labour win (new seat)				
Labour win (new seat)				

=== Wandsworth ===
Wandsworth (4)
Party	Candidate	Votes	%	±%
Labour	M. C. Jay	53,747		
Labour	Norman George Mollett Prichard	52,606		
Labour	George Frederick Rowe	51,857		
Labour	Joseph Simeon Samuels	51,292		
Conservative	M. Bowen	37,459		
Conservative	J. I. Tweedie-Smith	37,292		
Conservative	F. L. Abbott	37,258		
Conservative	D. Y. Fell	36,776		
Liberal	A. Cowen	8,630		
Liberal	R. A. Locke	8,443		
Liberal	M. E. Lawson	7,897		
Liberal	C. V. Gittins	7,716		
Communist	G. M. Easton	3,116		
Communist	D. J. Welsh	2,143		
Turnout				
Labour win (new seat)				
Labour win (new seat)				
Labour win (new seat)				
Labour win (new seat)				

=== Westminster and the City of London ===
Westminster and the City of London (4)
Party	Candidate	Votes	%	±%
Conservative	Louis Halle Gluckstein	40,109		
Conservative	Harold Sebag-Montefiore	39,856		
Conservative	Samuel Isidore Salmon	39,703		
Conservative	Arthur Desmond Herne Plummer	39,581		
Labour	J. J. Curran	25,735		
Labour	H. E. Browne	25,511		
Labour	Countess Lucan	25,136		
Labour	B. C. G. Whitaker	24,856		
Liberal	Timothy Wentworth Beaumont	4,996		
Liberal	Richard Lord Afton	4,405		
Liberal	Arthur William Robert Capel	4,112		
Liberal	Lady Ruth Abrahams	4,035		
Communist	L. R. Temple	1,758		
Turnout				
Conservative win (new seat)				
Conservative win (new seat)				
Conservative win (new seat)				
Conservative win (new seat)				

== By-elections 1964-1967 ==
Less than a month after the election, Marjorie McIntosh (Labour, Hammersmith) died and precipitated a byelection; however, given that the voters had elected the GLC and the new London boroughs, the parties were short of money and the Conservatives decided not to oppose the Labour candidate who was returned unopposed on 18 June. Oliver Galley (Conservative, Harrow, died in October 1965 and the Conservatives retained his seat at a byelection on 27 January 1966. By the end of the term, there were two seats vacant due to the resignations of Sir Joseph Haygarth (Conservative, Barnet) and Mrs Mavis Webster (Labour, Waltham Forest).

There was one aldermanic by-election in 1965 caused by the resignation of Donald Soper (Labour). Frederick Lionel Tonge (Labour) was elected by the council on 6 July 1965, to serve until 1967.
