= Electoral district of Paddington =

Electoral district of Paddington may refer to:

- Paddington (UK Parliament constituency)
- Paddington (electoral division), Greater London Council
- Electoral district of Paddington (New South Wales)
- Electoral district of Paddington (Queensland)
- Electoral district of Paddington-Waverley
