= Richmond (electoral division) =

Electoral division in Greater London, 1973–1986

- Former electoral division for the Greater London Council
- District: Richmond upon Thames
- Electorate: 53,758 (1973); 51,381 (1977); 49,766 (1981)
- Major settlements: Richmond
- Area: 2,684 hectares (26.84 km^{2})

Former electoral division
- Created: 1973
- Abolished: 1986
- Member: 1
- Created from: Richmond upon Thames

Richmond was an electoral division for the purposes of elections to the Greater London Council. The constituency elected one councillor for a four-year term in 1973, 1977 and 1981, with the final term extended for an extra year ahead of the abolition of the Greater London Council.

== History ==
It was planned to use the same boundaries as the Westminster Parliament constituencies for election of councillors to the Greater London Council (GLC), as had been the practice for elections to the predecessor London County Council, but those that existed in 1965 crossed the Greater London boundary. Until new constituencies could be settled, the 32 London boroughs were used as electoral areas. The London Borough of Richmond upon Thames formed the Richmond upon Thames electoral division. This was used for the Greater London Council elections in 1964, 1967 and 1970.

The new constituencies were settled following the Second Periodic Review of Westminster constituencies and the new electoral division matched the boundaries of the Richmond parliamentary constituency.

It covered an area of 2,684 hectares (26.84 km^{2}).

== Elections ==
The Richmond constituency was used for the Greater London Council elections in 1973, 1977 and 1981. One councillor was elected at each election using first-past-the-post voting.

=== 1973 election ===
The fourth election to the GLC (and first using revised boundaries) was held on 12 April 1973. The electorate was 53,758 and one Liberal Party councillor was elected. The turnout was 51.2%. The councillor was elected for a three-year term. This was extended for an extra year in 1976 when the electoral cycle was switched to four-yearly.

1973 Greater London Council election: Richmond
Party	Candidate	Votes	%	±%
Liberal	Stanley Rundle	12,160	44.17	
Conservative	B. S. Feldman	9,312	33.85	
Labour	K. L. Elmes	5,796	21.06	
Communist	E. Tendler	250	0.91	
Turnout				
Liberal win (new seat)				

=== 1977 election ===
The fifth election to the GLC (and second using revised boundaries) was held on 5 May 1977. The electorate was 51,381 and one Conservative Party councillor was elected. The turnout was 58.1%. The councillor was elected for a four-year term.

1977 Greater London Council election: Richmond
Party	Candidate	Votes	%	±%
Conservative	Edward Julian Egerton Leigh	14,508	48.71	
Liberal	A. M. Cornish	10,904	36.44	
Labour	A. B. Hart	3,574	11.94	
National Front	J. Harrison-Broadley	536	1.79	
GLC Abolitionist Campaign	A. Billingham	338	1.13	
Turnout				
Conservative gain from Liberal		Swing		

=== 1981 election ===
The sixth and final election to the GLC (and third using revised boundaries) was held on 7 May 1981. The electorate was 49,766 and one Liberal Party councillor was elected. The turnout was 62.4%. The councillor was elected for a four-year term, extended by an extra year by the Local Government (Interim Provisions) Act 1984, ahead of the abolition of the council.

1981 Greater London Council election: Richmond
Party	Candidate	Votes	%	±%
Liberal	Adrian Carnegie Slade	14,168	45.62	
Conservative	Edward Julian Egerton Leigh	14,053	45.22	
Labour	Elizabeth Nash	2,431	7.83	
Ecology	Barnaby Martin	300	0.97	
Save London Action Group	Gwendoline M. Marsh	112	0.36	
Turnout				
Liberal gain from Conservative		Swing		
