= St Marylebone (electoral division) =

Electoral division in Greater London, 1973–1986

- Former electoral division for the Greater London Council
- St Marylebone electoral division boundaries
- District: Westminster
- Electorate: 44,215 (1973); 41,377 (1977); 38,826 (1981)
- Major settlements: Marylebone
- Area: 595 hectares (5.95 km^{2})

Former electoral division
- Created: 1973
- Abolished: 1986
- Member: 1
- Created from: Westminster and the City of London

St Marylebone was an electoral division for the purposes of elections to the Greater London Council. The constituency elected one councillor for a four-year term in 1973, 1977 and 1981, with the final term extended for an extra year ahead of the abolition of the Greater London Council.

== History ==
It was planned to use the same boundaries as the Westminster Parliament constituencies for election of councillors to the Greater London Council (GLC), as had been the practice for elections to the predecessor London County Council, but those that existed in 1965 crossed the Greater London boundary. Until new constituencies could be settled, the 32 London boroughs were used as electoral areas. The City of Westminster was joined with the City of London for this purpose, creating a constituency called Westminster and the City of London. This was used for the Greater London Council elections in 1964, 1967 and 1970.

The new constituencies were settled following the Second Periodic Review of Westminster constituencies and the new electoral division matched the boundaries of the St Marylebone parliamentary constituency.

The area was in a long-term period of population decline that was yet to reverse. The electorate reduced from 44,215 in 1973 to 38,826 in 1981. It covered an area of 595 hectares (5.95 km^{2}).

== Elections ==
The St Marylebone constituency was used for the Greater London Council elections in 1973, 1977 and 1981. One councillor was elected at each election using first-past-the-post voting.

=== 1973 election ===
The fourth election to the GLC (and first using revised boundaries) was held on 12 April 1973. The electorate was 44,215 and one Conservative Party councillor was elected. The turnout was 31.1%. The councillor was elected for a three-year term. This was extended for an extra year in 1976 when the electoral cycle was switched to four-yearly.

1973 Greater London Council election: St Marylebone
Party	Candidate	Votes	%	±%
Conservative	Desmond Plummer	7,930	55.96	
Labour	J. Gordon	4,971	37.62	
Unofficial Conservative	P. Darvas	485	3.67	
Communist	L. R. Temple	276	2.09	
Socialist (GB)	R. A. Weidberg	84	0.64	
Turnout				
Conservative win (new seat)				

=== 1976 by-election ===
A by-election was held on 8 April 1976, following the resignation of Desmond Plummer. One Conservative Party councillor was elected. The turnout was 22.5%.

St Marylebone by-election, 1976
Party	Candidate	Votes	%	±%
Conservative	Herbert Henry Sandford	6,080	64.29	
Labour	D. Miles	2,854	30.18	
Liberal	Bates, J.H.	428	4.53	
Socialist (GB)	J. D'Arcy	96	1.02	
Turnout				
Conservative hold		Swing		

=== 1977 election ===
The fifth election to the GLC (and second using revised boundaries) was held on 5 May 1977. The electorate was 41,377 and one Conservative Party councillor was elected. The turnout was 37.1%. The councillor was elected for a four-year term.

1977 Greater London Council election: St Marylebone
Party	Candidate	Votes	%	±%
Conservative	Herbert Henry Sandford	10,359	67.63	
Labour	Ian J C Peddie	3,468	22.65	
Liberal	P R Vandekar	645	4.21	
National Front	Charles Elrick	372	2.43	
Ecology	Jonathon Espie Porritt	298	1.95	
Socialist (GB)	James D'Arcy	102	0.67	
Co-operative Housing	B D Lake	67	0.44	
Majority				
Turnout				
Conservative hold		Swing		

=== 1981 election ===
The sixth and final election to the GLC (and third using revised boundaries) was held on 7 May 1981. The electorate was 38,826 and one Conservative Party councillor was elected. The turnout was 37.4%. The councillor was elected for a four-year term, extended by an extra year by the Local Government (Interim Provisions) Act 1984, ahead of the abolition of the council.

1981 Greater London Council election: St Marylebone
Party	Candidate	Votes	%	±%
Conservative	Herbert Henry Sandford	8,183	56.57	
Labour Co-op	Jean Merriton	4,573	31.60	
Liberal	Penelope E. Baker	1,305	9.02	
Ecology	Audrey B. Hickey	408	2.82	
Turnout				
Conservative hold		Swing		
