= Westminster and the City of London (electoral division) =

Electoral division in Greater London, 1965–1973

- Former electoral division for the Greater London Council
- Westminster and the City of London electoral division boundaries
- District: City of Westminster and City of London
- Population: 244,710 (1969 estimate)
- Electorate: 192,744 (1964); 180,968 (1967); 174,838 (1970)
- Major settlements: City of London, Marylebone, Paddington, Westminster
- Area: 6,010.2 acres (24.322 km^{2})

Former electoral division
- Created: 1965
- Abolished: 1973
- Member: 4
- Replaced by: City of London and Westminster South, St Marylebone and Paddington

Westminster and the City of London was an electoral division for the purposes of elections to the Greater London Council. The constituency elected four councillors for a three-year term in 1964, 1967 and 1970. Desmond Plummer, the leader of the Greater London Council from 1967 to 1973, was elected from the division.

== History ==
It was planned to use the same boundaries as the Westminster Parliament constituencies for election of councillors to the Greater London Council (GLC), as had been the practice for elections to the predecessor London County Council, but those that existed in 1965 crossed the Greater London boundary. Until new constituencies could be settled, the 32 London boroughs were used as electoral areas. The City of Westminster was joined with the City of London for this purpose, creating a constituency called Westminster and the City of London. It replaced the London County Council constituencies of Cities of London and Westminster, Paddington North, Paddington South and St Marylebone.

Covering much of the innermost part of London, including large parts of Central London and the West End of London, the area was in a long-term period of population decline that was yet to reverse. The electorate reduced from 192,744 in 1964 to 174,838 in 1970. The population in 1969 was estimated to be 244,710. Covering an area of 6,010.2 acres (24.322 km^{2}), the population density was 40.7 inhabitants per acre (10,100/km^{2}).

The electoral division was replaced from 1973 by the single-member electoral divisions of City of London and Westminster South, St Marylebone and Paddington.

== Elections ==
The Westminster and the City of London constituency was used for the Greater London Council elections in 1964, 1967 and 1970. Four councillors were elected at each election using first-past-the-post voting. Desmond Plummer, who was successful at all three elections, was Leader of the Greater London Council from 1967 to 1973.

=== 1964 election ===
The first election was held on 9 April 1964, a year before the council came into its powers. The electorate was 192,744 and four Conservative Party councillors were elected. With 72,835 people voting, the turnout was 37.8%. The councillors were elected for a three-year term. Of those elected, Desmond Plummer and Louis Gluckstein were previously LCC councillors for St Marylebone, Samuel Isidore Salmon had been a councillor for Cities of London and Westminster since 1949 and Harold Sebag-Montefiore had unsuccessfully stood for Paddington North in 1961.

1964 Greater London Council election: Westminster and the City of London
| Party | Candidate | Votes | % | ±% |
|---|---|---|---|---|
| Conservative | Louis Gluckstein | 40,109 | | |
| Conservative | Harold Sebag-Montefiore | 39,856 | | |
| Conservative | Samuel Isidore Salmon | 39,703 | | |
| Conservative | Desmond Plummer | 39,581 | | |
| Labour | J. J. Curran | 25,735 | | |
| Labour | H. E. Browne | 25,511 | | |
| Labour | Countess Lucan | 25,136 | | |
| Labour | B. C. G. Whitaker | 24,856 | | |
| Liberal | Timothy Wentworth Beaumont | 4,996 | | |
| Liberal | Richard L. Afton | 4,405 | | |
| Liberal | Arthur William Robert Capel | 4,112 | | |
| Liberal | Lady Ruth Abrahams | 4,035 | | |
| Communist | L. R. Temple | 1,758 | | |
| Turnout | | | | |
| Conservative win (new seat) | | | | |
| Conservative win (new seat) | | | | |
| Conservative win (new seat) | | | | |
| Conservative win (new seat) | | | | |

=== 1967 election ===
The second election was held on 13 April 1967. The electorate was 180,968 and four Conservative Party councillors were elected. With 60,718 people voting, the turnout was 33.6%. The councillors were elected for a three-year term.

1967 Greater London Council election: Westminster and the City of London
| Party | Candidate | Votes | % | ±% |
|---|---|---|---|---|
| Conservative | Harold Sebag-Montefiore | 38,447 | | |
| Conservative | Desmond Plummer | 38,238 | | |
| Conservative | Roland Freeman | 38,092 | | |
| Conservative | Michael Grylls | 37,305 | | |
| Labour | D. R. Goodman | 15,574 | | |
| Labour | J. Fairhead | 15,433 | | |
| Labour | Countess Lucan | 15,175 | | |
| Labour | Lady Kennet | 15,040 | | |
| Liberal | D. A. T. Savill | 4,283 | | |
| Liberal | T. P. M. Houston | 4,264 | | |
| Liberal | Arthur William Robert Capel | 4,208 | | |
| Liberal | J. Steel | 3,785 | | |
| Communist | L. R. Temple | 1,340 | | |
| Independent Carnaby | Harry Fox | 1,081 | | |
| Independent | G. E. F. Bate | 697 | | |
| Independent Carnaby | Henry Moss | 659 | | |
| Turnout | | | | |
| Conservative hold | | Swing | | |
| Conservative hold | | Swing | | |
| Conservative hold | | Swing | | |
| Conservative hold | | Swing | | |

Harry Fox and Henry Moss stood for election as a stunt to promote the Lady Jane boutique on Carnaby Street. Roland Freeman later represented Finchley from 1975 to 1981.

=== 1970 election ===
The third election was held on 9 April 1970. The electorate was 174,838 and four Conservative Party councillors were elected. With 52,578 people voting, the turnout was 30.1%. The councillors were elected for a three-year term.

1970 Greater London Council election: Westminster and the City of London
| Party | Candidate | Votes | % | ±% |
|---|---|---|---|---|
| Conservative | Desmond Plummer | 31,742 | | |
| Conservative | Harold Sebag-Montefiore | 31,307 | | |
| Conservative | Maurice Patrick Gaffney | 30,960 | | |
| Conservative | Mervyn Scorgie | 30,773 | | |
| Labour | W. M. Bryden | 16,930 | | |
| Labour | G. E. Haywood | 16,639 | | |
| Labour | K. McNicholas | 16,552 | | |
| Labour | S. L. Saunders | 16,280 | | |
| Liberal | M. M. G. Andrews | 1,533 | | |
| Liberal | J. Steel | 1,456 | | |
| Liberal | E. Pemberton | 1,452 | | |
| Liberal | D. Miss Hart | 1,286 | | |
| Homes Before Roads | D. Hart | 1,110 | | |
| Homes Before Roads | D. J. Dux | 1,021 | | |
| Homes Before Roads | J. H. Larrett | 844 | | |
| Communist | L. R. Temple | 823 | | |
| Communist | J. A. Henry | 822 | | |
| Homes Before Roads | A. E Watkins | 745 | | |
| Union Movement | P. J. F. Crisp | 321 | | |
| Turnout | | | | |
| Conservative hold | | Swing | | |
| Conservative hold | | Swing | | |
| Conservative hold | | Swing | | |
| Conservative hold | | Swing | | |
