= Southwark (electoral division) =

Electoral division in Greater London, 1965–1973

- Former electoral division for the Greater London Council
- Southwark electoral division boundaries
- District: London Borough of Southwark
- Population: 290,530 (1969 estimate)
- Electorate: 210,292 (1964); 199,510 (1967); 202,533 (1970)
- Area: 7,117.4 acres (28.803 km^{2})

Former electoral division
- Created: 1965
- Abolished: 1973
- Member(s): 4
- Replaced by: Bermondsey, Dulwich, Peckham

Southwark was an electoral division for the purposes of elections to the Greater London Council. The constituency elected four councillors for a three-year term in 1964, 1967 and 1970.

== History ==
It was planned to use the same boundaries as the Westminster Parliament constituencies for election of councillors to the Greater London Council (GLC), as had been the practice for elections to the predecessor London County Council, but those that existed in 1965 crossed the Greater London boundary. Until new constituencies could be settled, the 32 London boroughs were used as electoral areas which therefore created a constituency called Southwark.

The electoral division was replaced from 1973 by the single-member electoral divisions of Bermondsey, Dulwich, Peckham.

== Elections ==
The Southwark constituency was used for the Greater London Council elections in 1964, 1967 and 1970. Four councillors were elected at each election using first-past-the-post voting.

=== 1964 election ===
The first election was held on 9 April 1964, a year before the council came into its powers. The electorate was 210,292 and four Labour Party councillors were elected. With 70,675 people voting, the turnout was 33.6%. The councillors were elected for a three-year term.

1964 Greater London Council election: Southwark
Party	Candidate	Votes	%	±%
Labour	Reginald Eustace Goodwin	49,518		
Labour	Henry George Lamborn	49,480		
Labour	Edgar Ernest Reed	48,471		
Labour	Albert Edward Samuels	47,177		
Conservative	Toby Francis Henry Jessel	18,333		
Conservative	J. A. Prichard	17,568		
Conservative	A. P. R. Noble	17,401		
Conservative	J. G. L. M. Porter	17,148		
Communist	S. P. Bent	4,311		
Turnout				
Labour win (new seat)				
Labour win (new seat)				
Labour win (new seat)				
Labour win (new seat)				

=== 1967 election ===
The second election was held on 13 April 1967. The electorate was 199,510 and four Labour Party councillors were elected. With 55,161 people voting, the turnout was 27.6%. The councillors were elected for a three-year term.

1967 Greater London Council election: Southwark
Party	Candidate	Votes	%	±%
Labour	Reginald Eustace Goodwin	29,651		
Labour	Henry G. Lamborn	28,772		
Labour	Rev. Harvey W. Hinds	28,667		
Labour	Edgar Ernest Reed	28,337		
Conservative	J. Gordon	18,291		
Conservative	T. C. Farmer	18,262		
Conservative	G. H. J. Nicholson	18,158		
Conservative	B. Phelps	18,003		
Liberal	S. Saltmarsh	3,389		
Liberal	Mrs. A. Bennett	3,315		
Communist	S. P. Bent	3,297		
Communist	P. J. Hicks	3,291		
Liberal	A. C. Stobie	3,285		
Liberal	J. F. Sutton	2,957		
Independent	W. Jenkinson	2,179		
Turnout				
Labour hold		Swing		
Labour hold		Swing		
Labour hold		Swing		
Labour hold		Swing		

=== 1970 election ===
The third election was held on 9 April 1970. The electorate was 202,533 and four Labour Party councillors were elected. With 57,978 people voting, the turnout was 28.6%. The councillors were elected for a three-year term.

1970 Greater London Council election: Southwark
Party	Candidate	Votes	%	±%
Labour	Sir Reginald Goodwin	36,092		
Labour	Frederick James Francis	35,559		
Labour	Henry George Lamborn	35,128		
Labour	The Rev. Canon Harvey Hinds	34,759		
Conservative	J. Gordon	17,807		
Conservative	D. M. Lang	17,771		
Conservative	G. H. J. Nicholson	17,713		
Conservative	H. W. Wilson	17,643		
Communist	E. D. Hume	1,438		
Communist	E. L. Hodson	1,241		
Homes before Roads	A. J. Baxter	1,217		
Liberal	Mrs. B. M. Chance	1,192		
Liberal	C. R. Chance	1,120		
Liberal	Miss M. Pedley	1,104		
Homes before Roads	T. W. H. Capon	1,068		
Liberal	S. W. F. Saltmarsh	1,023		
Homes before Roads	Mrs. S. M. Tanner	997		
Homes before Roads	C. J. E. Harlow	917		
Independent	F. L. Guy	591		
Union Movement	D. R. M. Archer	357		
Turnout				
Labour hold		Swing		
Labour hold		Swing		
Labour hold		Swing		
Labour hold		Swing		
