= Twickenham (electoral division) =

Electoral division in Greater London, 1973–1986

- Former electoral division for the Greater London Council
- District: Richmond upon Thames
- Electorate: 72,265 (1973); 71,699 (1977); 70,875 (1981)
- Major settlements: Twickenham
- Area: 2,842 hectares (28.42 km^{2})

Former electoral division
- Created: 1973
- Abolished: 1986
- Member: 1
- Created from: Richmond upon Thames

Twickenham was an electoral division for the purposes of elections to the Greater London Council. The constituency elected one councillor for a four-year term in 1973, 1977 and 1981, with the final term extended for an extra year ahead of the abolition of the Greater London Council.

== History ==
It was planned to use the same boundaries as the Westminster Parliament constituencies for election of councillors to the Greater London Council (GLC), as had been the practice for elections to the predecessor London County Council, but those that existed in 1965 crossed the Greater London boundary. Until new constituencies could be settled, the 32 London boroughs were used as electoral areas. The London Borough of Richmond upon Thames formed the Richmond upon Thames electoral division. This was used for the Greater London Council elections in 1964, 1967 and 1970.

The new constituencies were settled following the Second Periodic Review of Westminster constituencies and the new electoral division matched the boundaries of the Twickenham parliamentary constituency.

It covered an area of 2,842 hectares (28.42 km^{2}).

== Elections ==
The Twickenham constituency was used for the Greater London Council elections in 1973, 1977 and 1981. One councillor was elected at each election using first-past-the-post voting.

=== 1973 election ===
The fourth election to the GLC (and first using revised boundaries) was held on 12 April 1973. The electorate was 72,265 and one Conservative Party councillor was elected. The turnout was 44.0%. The councillor was elected for a three-year term. This was extended for an extra year in 1976 when the electoral cycle was switched to four-yearly.

1973 Greater London Council election: Twickenham
Party	Candidate	Votes	%	±%
Conservative	George William Tremlett	13,765	43.35	
Labour	P. T. Z. Goldring	12,386	38.95	
Liberal	C. J. Barnes	5,625	17.71	
Turnout				
Conservative win (new seat)				

=== 1977 election ===
The fifth election to the GLC (and second using revised boundaries) was held on 5 May 1977. The electorate was 71,699 and one Conservative Party councillor was elected. The turnout was 50.0%. The councillor was elected for a four-year term.

1977 Greater London Council election: Twickenham
Party	Candidate	Votes	%	±%
Conservative	George William Tremlett	20,357	56.81	
Liberal	John P. M. Rowlands	8,488	23.70	
Labour	A. S. Proud	5,686	15.87	
National Front	D. E. Ware	879	2.45	
GLC Abolitionist Campaign	H. K. Black	429	1.20	
Turnout				
Conservative hold		Swing		

=== 1981 election ===
The sixth and final election to the GLC (and third using revised boundaries) was held on 7 May 1981. The electorate was 70,875 and one Conservative Party councillor was elected. The turnout was 54.7%. The councillor was elected for a four-year term, extended by an extra year by the Local Government (Interim Provisions) Act 1984, ahead of the abolition of the council.

1981 Greater London Council election: Twickenham
Party	Candidate	Votes	%	±%
Conservative	George William Tremlett	17,513	45.19	
Liberal	John P. M. Rowlands	15,906	41.03	
Labour	Brian A. Kemp	4,856	12.53	
Ecology	Peter Furtado	486	1.25	
Turnout				
Conservative hold		Swing		
