= Bermondsey (electoral division) =

Electoral division in Greater London, 1973–1986

- Former electoral division for the Greater London Council
- Bermondsey electoral division boundaries
- District: Southwark
- Electorate: 56,043 (1973); 53,386 (1977); 51,169 (1981)
- Major settlements: Bermondsey
- Area: 1,005 hectares (10.05 km^{2}) (1973); 927 hectares (9.27 km^{2}) (1977/1981)

Former electoral division
- Created: 1973
- Abolished: 1986
- Member: 1
- Created from: Southwark

Bermondsey was an electoral division for the purposes of elections to the Greater London Council. The constituency elected one councillor for a four-year term in 1973, 1977 and 1981, with the final term extended for an extra year ahead of the abolition of the Greater London Council.

== History ==
It was planned to use the same boundaries as the Westminster Parliament constituencies for election of councillors to the Greater London Council (GLC), as had been the practice for elections to the predecessor London County Council, but those that existed in 1965 crossed the Greater London boundary. Until new constituencies could be settled, the 32 London boroughs were used as electoral areas. The London Borough of Southwark formed the Southwark electoral division. This was used for the Greater London Council elections in 1964, 1967 and 1970.

The new constituencies were settled following the Second Periodic Review of Westminster constituencies and the new electoral division matched the boundaries of the Bermondsey parliamentary constituency.

The area was in a long-term period of population decline that was yet to reverse. The electorate reduced from 56,043 in 1973 to 51,169 in 1981. It covered an area of 1,005 hectares (10.05 km^{2}) in 1973. Revisions to ward boundaries in the London Borough of Southwark changed the area of the division to 927 hectares (9.27 km^{2}) for the 1977 and 1981 elections.

== Elections ==
The Bermondsey constituency was used for the Greater London Council elections in 1973, 1977 and 1981. One councillor was elected at each election using first-past-the-post voting. Reg Goodwin, who was elected from the constituency in 1973 and 1977, was Leader of the Greater London Council from 1973 to 1977. He was previously elected to represent Southwark in 1964, 1967 and 1970.

=== 1973 election ===
The fourth election to the GLC (and first using revised boundaries) was held on 12 April 1973. The electorate was 56,043 and one Labour Party councillor was elected. The turnout was 30.5%. The councillor was elected for a three-year term. This was extended for an extra year in 1976 when the electoral cycle was switched to four-yearly.

1973 Greater London Council election: Bermondsey
Party	Candidate	Votes	%	±%
Labour	Reg Goodwin	14,617	85.53	N/A
Conservative	A. J. Padmore	1,480	8.66	N/A
National Front	R. S. Pritchard	992	5.81	N/A
Turnout		17,089	30.5	
Labour win (new seat)				

=== 1977 election ===
The fifth election to the GLC (and second using revised boundaries) was held on 5 May 1977. The electorate was 53,386 and one Labour Party councillor was elected. The turnout was 32.4%. The councillor was elected for a four-year term.

1977 Greater London Council election: Bermondsey
Party	Candidate	Votes	%	±%
Labour	Reg Goodwin	10,980	63.73	−21.80
Conservative	A. A. Duma	3,661	21.25	+12.59
National Front	J. S. Sneath	1,515	8.79	+2.98
Liberal	R. A Sandford	499	2.90	New
Communist	R. Gordon	334	1.94	New
National Party	L. E. Clifford	239	1.39	New
Turnout		17,228	32.4	+1.9
Labour hold		Swing	-17.2	

=== 1981 election ===
The sixth and final election to the GLC (and third using revised boundaries) was held on 7 May 1981. The electorate was 51,169 and one Labour Party councillor was elected. The turnout was 35.7%. The councillor was elected for a four-year term, extended by an extra year by the Local Government (Interim Provisions) Act 1984, ahead of the abolition of the council.

1981 Greater London Council election: Bermondsey
Party	Candidate	Votes	%	±%
Labour	George E. Nicholson	12,000	65.98	
Liberal	Simon Hughes	2,914	16.02	
Conservative	Nicholas P. Mearing-Smith	2,444	13.44	
National Front	James S. Sneath	830	4.56	
Turnout		18,188		
Labour hold		Swing		

Simon Hughes was elected MP at the 1983 Bermondsey by-election.
