= 1970 Greater London Council election =

Local election in England

- 9 April 1970

100 councillors 51 seats needed for a majority
	First party	Second party
Leader	Desmond Plummer	Reg Goodwin
Party	Conservative	Labour
Leader since	1964	1967
Leader's seat	Westminster and the City of London	Southwark
Seats won	65	35
Seat change	▼17	▲17
Popular vote	971,227	766,271
Percentage	50.6%	39.9%
Swing	▼2.1%	▲5.9%
- Results by electoral division
Leader before election
Desmond Plummer
Conservative Party
Leader after election
Desmond Plummer
Conservative Party

The third election to the Greater London Council was held on 9 April 1970 and saw a Conservative victory with a reduced majority.

== Electoral arrangements ==
New constituencies to be used for elections to Parliament and also for elections to the GLC had not yet been settled, so the London boroughs were used as multi-member 'first past the post' electoral areas. Westminster was joined with the City of London for this purpose. Each electoral area returned between 2 and 4 councillors. Polling day was 9 April 1970, except in Hammersmith where it was delayed until 27 April 1970 because of the death of a candidate.

== Results ==
=== General election of councillors ===
The Conservative Party won a majority of seats at the election.

With an electorate of 5,524,384, there was a turnout of 35.2%. Labour recovered from its mauling three years previously, but did so primarily in working-class areas. Consequently, relatively few seats changed hands: Labour won back Camden, Greenwich, Hammersmith, Lewisham, Wandsworth, and one seat in Lambeth. The results did enable Labour to take back control of the Inner London Education Authority and were one of the factors used by Prime Minister Harold Wilson in deciding to call a general election soon after.

Among those who were first elected to the GLC in 1970 were Tony Banks (Labour, Hammersmith, later Minister for Sport) and Sir George Young (Conservative, Ealing, later a cabinet minister under John Major). The election is also significant as it was at a meeting in support of the Conservative candidates in Lambeth that John Major met Norma Johnson, who became his wife.

Party	Votes			Seats			
Party	Number	%	+/-	Stood	Seats	%	+/-
Conservative	971,227	50.6	▼2.1	100	65	65.0	▼17
Labour	766,272	39.9	▲5.9	100	35	35.0	▲17
Liberal	103,838	5.4	▼3.4	100	0	0.0	Steady
Communist	33,869	1.8	▼1.3	40	0	0.0	Steady
Homes before Roads	23,854	1.2	New	85	0	0.0	Steady
Union Movement	10,432	0.6	▲0.2	32	0	0.0	Steady
Independent	6,450	0.3	▼0.3	9	0	0.0	Steady
Socialist (GB)	1,656	0.1	▼0.1	14	0	0.0	Steady
Independent Liberal	1,250	0.1	New	1	0	0.0	Steady
John Hampden New Freedom Party	552	0.0	0.0	1	0	0.0	Steady
New Liberal	438	0.0	New	3	0	0.0	Steady
Movement for People's Democracy	405	0.0	New	1	0	0.0	Steady
All Night Party / Bread and Circuses Party / Campaign for Non-Political Social Awareness ^{1}	177	0.0	New	5	0	0.0	Steady

^{1} These parties were created by a group of students standing in Haringey, who declared that they intended to make a mockery of the election.

=== Aldermanic election ===
In addition to the 100 councillors, there were sixteen aldermen elected by the council. Eight aldermen elected in 1967 continued to serve until 1973 and eight elected in 1964 retired before the 1970 election. Eight aldermen were elected by the council on 28 April 1970 to serve until 1976.

Aldermen elected in 1970, to retire in 1976: (Note: The term was extended to seven years by the London Councillors Order 1976 and aldermen elected in 1970 served until 1977.)

Party	Alderman
Conservative	Frank Lewis Abbott
Conservative	Francis Ernest Herman Bennett
Conservative	Leslie Freeman
Labour	Arthur James Hichisson
Conservative	Thomas Ponsonby
Labour	Reginald Prentice (Note: Resigned 29 March 1971)
Conservative	Lena Townsend
Conservative	Gerard Folliott Vaughan (Note: Resigned 18 September 1972)

The aldermen divided 11 Conservative and 5 Labour, so that the Conservatives had 76 members to 40 for Labour following the aldermanic election.

== By-elections 1970–1973 ==
No seats changed hands in by-elections during this term. The Conservatives retained Kensington and Chelsea on 2 December 1971 after the death of Seton Forbes-Cockell, and Barnet on 19 October 1972 after the death of Arthur Peacock. Labour retained Wandsworth on 15 June 1972 after the death of Sir Norman Prichard. No seats were vacant at the end of the term.

There were three aldermanic by-elections caused by the resignations of David Gilbert Baker (Conservative), Brian Caldwell Cook Batsford (Conservative) and Christopher John Chataway (Conservative) in 1970. Three replacement aldermen were elected on 28 April 1970 (coinciding with the normal election of alderman). Ewan Geddes Carr (Labour), Illtyd Harrington (Labour) and William Watts (Labour) were elected, to serve until 1973.

Three further aldermanic by-elections were caused by the resignations of Reginald Ernest Prentice (Labour) in 1971, Timothy Charles Farmer (Labour) in 1971 and Gerard Folliott Vaughan (Conservative) in 1972. Alfred Frederick Joseph Chorley (Labour) was elected by the council on 4 May 1971, to serve until 1976. (Note: The term was extended to 1977 by the London Councillors Order 1976) Bernard James Perkins (Labour) was elected by the council on 19 October 1971, to serve until 1973. Gordon William Herbert Taylor (Conservative) was elected by the council on 3 October 1972, to serve until 1976. (Note: The term was extended to 1977 by the London Councillors Order 1976)
