= Paddington (electoral division) =

Electoral division in Greater London, 1973–1986

- Former electoral division for the Greater London Council
- Paddington electoral division boundaries
- District: Westminster
- Electorate: 60,436 (1973); 56,406 (1977); 54,168 (1981); 53,700 (1984)
- Major settlements: Paddington
- Area: 521 hectares (5.21 km^{2})

Former electoral division
- Created: 1973
- Abolished: 1986
- Member: 1
- Created from: Westminster and the City of London

Paddington was an electoral division for the purposes of elections to the Greater London Council. The constituency elected one councillor for a four-year term in 1973, 1977 and 1981, with the final term extended for an extra year ahead of the abolition of the Greater London Council. Ken Livingstone, the leader of the Greater London Council from 1981 to 1986, was elected from the division in 1981 and at a by-election in 1984.

== History ==
It was planned to use the same boundaries as the Westminster Parliament constituencies for election of councillors to the Greater London Council (GLC), as had been the practice for elections to the predecessor London County Council, but those that existed in 1965 crossed the Greater London boundary. Until new constituencies could be settled, the 32 London boroughs were used as electoral areas. The City of Westminster was joined with the City of London for this purpose, creating a constituency called Westminster and the City of London. This was used for the Greater London Council elections in 1964, 1967 and 1970.

The new constituencies were settled following the Second Periodic Review of Westminster constituencies and the new electoral division matched the boundaries of the Paddington parliamentary constituency.

The area was in a long-term period of population decline that was yet to reverse. The electorate reduced from 60,436 in 1973 to 53,700 in 1984. It covered an area of 521 hectares (5.21 km^{2}).

== Elections ==
The Paddington constituency was used for the Greater London Council elections in 1973, 1977 and 1981. One councillor was elected at each election using first-past-the-post voting. Ken Livingstone, who was elected from the constituency in 1981, was Leader of the Greater London Council from 1981 to 1986. He was previously elected to represent Norwood in 1973 and Hackney North and Stoke Newington in 1977.

=== 1973 election ===
The fourth election to the GLC (and first using revised boundaries) was held on 12 April 1973. The electorate was 60,436 and one Labour Party councillor was elected. The turnout was 33.1%. The councillor was elected for a three-year term. This was extended for an extra year in 1976 when the electoral cycle was switched to four-yearly.

1973 Greater London Council election: Paddington
Party	Candidate	Votes	%	±%
Labour	J. Merriton	11,085	55.51	
Conservative	H. H. Sandford	7,101	35.56	
Liberal	J. H. Gover	1,609	8.06	
Independent	D. J. B. Morgan	172	0.86	
Turnout				
Labour win (new seat)				

=== 1977 election ===
The fifth election to the GLC (and second using revised boundaries) was held on 5 May 1977. The electorate was 56,406 and one Conservative Party councillor was elected. The turnout was 39.7%. The councillor was elected for a four-year term.

1977 Greater London Council election: Paddington
Party	Candidate	Votes	%	±%
Conservative	P. M. Kirwan	11,437	51.28	
Labour	J. Merriton	8,990	40.30	
National Front	R. A. Martin	879	3.94	
Liberal	Z. G. Kronbergs	712	3.19	
GLC Abolitionist Campaign	H. M. Lye	284	1.27	
Turnout				
Conservative gain from Labour		Swing		

=== 1981 election ===
The sixth and final election to the GLC (and third using revised boundaries) was held on 7 May 1981. The electorate was 54,168 and one Labour Party councillor was elected. The turnout was 43.8%. The councillor was elected for a four-year term, extended by an extra year by the Local Government (Interim Provisions) Act 1984, ahead of the abolition of the council.

1981 Greater London Council election: Paddington
Party	Candidate	Votes	%	±%
Labour	Kenneth Robert Livingstone	11,864	50.14	
Conservative	Patricia Mary Kirwan	8,467	35.79	
Social Democratic Alliance	James Spillius	1,845	7.79	
Liberal	Alastair John Brett	1,135	4.80	
National Front	William T. Acton	237	1.00	
Save London Action Group	David P. Green	109	0.46	
Turnout				
Labour gain from Conservative		Swing		

=== 1984 by-election ===
A by-election was held on 20 September 1984, following the resignation of Ken Livingstone. The by-election coincided with others in Edmonton, Hayes and Harlington and Lewisham West.

The electorate was 53,700 and one Labour Party councillor was elected. The turnout was 29.6%.

Paddington by-election, 1984
Party	Candidate	Votes	%	±%
Labour	Kenneth Robert Livingstone	12,414	78.19	
Liberal	Stephen J Harris	2,729	17.18	
Conservative, Anti-Common Market	R. Simmerson	287	1.81	
Abolish the GLC	S. Banks	226	1.42	
National Front	Roger L Denny	123	0.77	
Reform schools	G. Clerick	55	0.35	
Gaitskellite Labour	P. Nealton	45	0.28	
Turnout				
Labour hold		Swing		
