= 1967 Greater London Council election =

Local election in England

- 13 April 1967

100 councillors 51 seats needed for a majority
	First party	Second party
Leader	Desmond Plummer	Bill Fiske
Party	Conservative	Labour
Leader since	1964	1964
Leader's seat	Westminster and the City of London	Havering (lost seat)
Seats won	82	18
Seat change	▲46	▼46
Popular vote	1,136,092	732,669
Percentage	52.6%	34.0%
Swing	▲12.5%	▼10.6%
- Results by electoral division
Leader before election
Bill Fiske
Labour Party
Leader after election
Desmond Plummer
Conservative Party

The second election to the Greater London Council was held on 13 April 1967, and saw the first Conservative victory for a London-wide authority since 1931.

== Electoral arrangements ==
New constituencies to be used for elections to Parliament and also for elections to the GLC had not yet been settled, so the London boroughs were used as multi-member 'first past the post' electoral areas. Westminster was joined with the City of London for this purpose. Each electoral area returned between 2 and 4 councillors.

== Results ==
=== General election of councillors ===
The Conservative Party won a majority of seats at the election.

With an electorate of 5,319,023 and 2,187,789 persons voting, there was a turnout of 41.1%.

Among those defeated in the election were the GLC leader, Bill Fiske, who was pushed into fourth place in Havering by a Conservative team that included Jeffrey Archer, who was making his entrance into politics, and Peggy Jay in Wandsworth. Other notable politicians who had their first success at this election include Harvey Hinds (Labour, Southwark, later Chief Whip for Ken Livingstone) and Christopher Bland (Conservative, Lewisham, later Chairman of the BBC).

Party	Votes			Seats			
Party	Number	%	+/−	Stood	Seats	%	+/−
Conservative	1,136,092	52.6	▲12.5	100	82	82.0	▲46
Labour	732,669	34.0	▼10.6	100	18	18.0	▼46
Liberal	189,868	8.8	▼1.2	100	0	0.0	Steady
Communist	65,184	3.0	▼0.8	38	0	0.0	Steady
Independent	13,229	0.6	▼0.3	10	0	0.0	Steady
Union Movement	8,146	0.4	▲0.3	5	0	0.0	Steady
Socialist (GB)	3,695	0.2	New	14	0	0.0	Steady
National Union of Council Tenants	1,977	0.1	New	4	0	0.0	Steady
National Front	1,840	0.1	New	3	0	0.0	Steady
John Hampden New Freedom Party	1,580	0.1	New	1	0	0.0	Steady
Islington Tenants and Ratepayers Political Association	1,244	0.1	New	3	0	0.0	Steady
Ind. Carnaby Street candidates	870	0.0	New	2	0	0.0	Steady
Commonwealth Party	714	0.0	New	4	0	0.0	Steady
European Labour Party	664	0.0	New	1	0	0.0	Steady

=== Aldermanic election ===
In addition to the 100 elected councillors, there were sixteen aldermen on the council. Eight aldermen elected in 1964 continued to serve until 1970 and the other eight retired before the 1967 election. Eight aldermen were elected by the council on 2 May 1967 to serve until 1973.

Aldermen elected in 1967, to retire in 1973:

Party	Alderman
Conservative	David Gilbert Baker (Note: Resigned 22 April 1970)
Conservative	Brian Caldwell Cook Batsford (Note: Resigned 22 April 1970)
Conservative	Timothy James Bligh (Note: Died 21 March 1969)
Conservative	Christopher Chataway (Note: Resigned 22 April 1970)
Conservative	Timothy Charles Farmer (Note: Resigned 11 October 1971)
Conservative	Louis Gluckstein
Conservative	John Oliver Udal
Conservative	Lady Walton (Nellie Margaret Walton) (Note: Resigned 2 October 1968)

The aldermen divided 10 Conservative and 6 Labour, so that the Conservatives had a total 92 members to 24 for Labour following the aldermanic election.

== By-elections 1967–1970 ==
One of the successful Conservative candidates, Sheila Bradley (Greenwich), was a school nurse for the Inner London Education Authority. It was discovered that this was a disqualifying office, as she was in effect an employee of the GLC (as ILEA was technically a committee of the GLC); she resigned on 24 May prior to the hearing of an election petition. At a by-election on 29 June, Labour gained the seat. There were two further by-elections during the term: on 7 November 1968 the Conservatives held a seat in Bromley after the death of a councillor, and on 12 December of the same year the Conservatives held a seat in Havering after one of their councillors resigned. There were two seats vacant by the end of the term. A Conservative councillor for Harrow died on 8 June 1969, and on 8 January 1970 a Conservative councillor for Hammersmith was disqualified after failing to attend a meeting of the GLC or its committees for six months.

There were two aldermanic by-elections caused by the resignation of Nelly Margaret Walton (Conservative) in 1968 and the death of Timothy James Bligh (Conservative) in 1969. Richard Maddock Brew (Conservative) was elected by the council on 8 October 1968, to serve until 1973. Maurice Stephenson (Conservative) was elected by the council on 29 April 1969, to serve until 1973.
