= Samuel Isidore Salmon =

British businessman and politician (1900–1980)

Sir Samuel Isidore Salmon, CBE, JP (18 October 1900 – 10 November 1980) was a British politician, corporate executive, and philanthropist.

== Early life ==
Salmon was born in Kensington, London, the son of Isidore Salmon MP and Kate Abrahams. He attended Bedales School, for which he was head boy in 1919.

== Career ==
Salmon served on London County Council, representing Cities of London and Westminster, from 1949 until its abolition in 1965. From 1964 to 1967, he was a member of the Greater London Council for Westminster and the City of London. As an alderman, he became Deputy Chairman of the council in 1968. He was Mayor of Hammersmith in 1968–69, and from 1965 to 1968 was chairman of J. Lyons and Co.

== Personal life ==
Salmon married Lallah Wendy Benjamin; they had two children.
