= George Tremlett =

English writer (1939–2021)

George William Tremlett OBE (5 September 1939 – 30 October 2021) was an English author, bookshop owner, and politician.

== Writing ==
According to his own mini-biography, after leaving King Edward VI School, Stratford-upon-Avon, Tremlett worked for the Coventry Evening Telegraph from 1957 as a TV columnist and pop music reviewer. In 1961 he became a freelance rock journalist and in the 1970s he wrote a series of superficial paperback pop books, including The David Bowie Story, the first biography about the musician. In the early 1990s, he also published a rather flattering biography of former Libyan leader Muammar Gaddafi.

He was a biographer of Dylan Thomas and his wife Caitlin. He interviewed Caitlin at her home in Catania for the book Caitlin: Life with Dylan Thomas (New York, 1987). He has argued that Thomas was "the first rock star." In 1997 he published a book with James Nashold, The Death of Dylan Thomas, that claimed that Dylan Thomas' death was not due to alcohol poisoning but rather a mistake by Thomas' physician, Milton Feltenstein, who prescribed cortisone, morphine and benzedrine which put the poet into a coma prior to his being transferred to St. Vincent's Hospital. It was found at the hospital by two interns (William McVeigh and Frank Gilbertson) that Thomas had been suffering from pneumonia as well as the effects of the extraordinary air pollution in New York City at the time.

Tremlett moved to Laugharne, where Thomas spent the last years of his life, in 1982 and ran the Corran Bookshop, "a shrine to the poet." The shop also offers tourist information and was nominated for the Carmarthenshire Business Awards in 2005.

Tremlett died aged 82 at his home in Laugharne on 30 October 2021.

== Politics ==
Tremlett was a Conservative member for Twickenham on the Greater London Council. He served as head of Housing Policy under Horace Cutler and was Deputy Leader at one time. He opposed its abolition against the view of his own party, and was forced to resign from the GLC group owing to this disagreement. Tremlett wrote in the Morning Star that "During her first premiership, Mrs. Thatcher became obsessed with Ken Livingstone; she regarded him as a danger to the state. It was she who committed the Conservative Party to the abolition of the GLC by personally writing that commitment into the general election manifesto." His work as head of housing policy was profiled in the sixth episode of the first BBC series The Secret History of Our Streets (Arnold Circus).

He was appointed an Officer of the Order of the British Empire (OBE) in the 1981 Birthday Honours.

In 1979 he wrote Living Cities, a book critical of Conservative party housing policy.

== Personal life ==
His wife Jane is an independent County Councillor. He has three sons, Ben, Jack, Huw and Peter, and a daughter, Caroline.
