= Stanley Rundle =

British politician and philologist

Arthur Stanley Richard Rundle OBE (September 1913 – July 1978) was a British politician and philologist.

Rundle grew up in a bilingual part of Wales and had a working knowledge of thirty-one languages, including Welsh. He was educated at the Northampton School for Boys, the Northampton Institute, the University of Milan and the University of London. He claimed that, while in Milan, he had played the violin in an orchestra at La Scala. He completed two degrees, one in chemistry and the other in modern languages, and received a PhD in comparative linguistics. By the end of his life, was described being proficient in eighteen languages; he personally claimed to have a working knowledge of thirty-three, although this was on the basis of an approach he promoted, regarding European languages as dialects of English and learning just one hundred facts of each.

Rundle published Language as a Social and Political Factor in 1946. He became secretary of the Society of Linguists, and attempted to discover words in the communication of chimpanzees at London Zoo. In 1948, he wrote to the Cambridge University Press to suggest that it update its Italian dictionary; the press took the project on, and Rundle assisted with the compilation of the new Cambridge Italian Dictionary.

By 1965, Rundle was described as a "consultant chemist". In his spare time, he designed a typewriter with 44 keys which could compose more than 3,000 characters in the Japanese language.

Rundle joined the Liberal Party and was elected to the council of the Municipal Borough of Richmond. In 1964, this was replaced by Richmond upon Thames London Borough Council, and the party was wiped out. Rundle instead stood as the Liberal candidate for Kingston-upon-Thames at the 1964 United Kingdom general election, taking third place with 17.3% of the vote. At the 1966 United Kingdom general election, he was chosen as the candidate for Ipswich. A replacement for the popular Manuela Sykes only three weeks before the election; as expected, the Liberal vote fell.

Rundle targeted the Kew ward on Richmond Council from 1963, distributing the monthly Kew Comment bulletin. When a by-election occurred in 1966, he won the Liberal's first seat on the council. However, he was narrowly beaten in the 1968 Richmond upon Thames London Borough Council election, after a local residents' association put up rival candidates. Another by-election arose later that year, and Rundle won, becoming the only opposition councillor on the Conservative-dominated body. The Conservatives would meet in private to agree council business before holding a formal meeting with Rundle also present. In protest at this, Rundle organised his own pre-council meeting with local residents; over 400 turned up, attracting press attention.

At the 1970 United Kingdom general election, Rundle stood in Richmond, taking third place, with 17.0% of the votes cast. He stood in the Richmond seat at the 1973 Greater London Council election and won, forming a new Liberal group on the council with Ruth Shaw. He stated that he believed he would win the Westminster seat in the forthcoming general election, but ultimately came a close second, on 35.6%. Following the election, he became seriously ill, and did not stand in the October 1974 general election. Although never successful on the national stage, he led a revival of the Liberals on Richmond Council; by 1978, they held eighteen seats.

He was appointed OBE in the 1978 New Year Honours.

Rundle visited China, meeting some political leaders, aiming to advance the cause of peace. Early in 1978, he was made an Officer of the Order of the British Empire for this work.

Parents. Arthur Stanley Rundle, Ellen Rundle Siblings. Dora Rose Ellen Rundle, m. Hall Adrian, Barbara, Conrad, David, Edmund
