= Cities of London and Westminster (London County Council constituency) =

Former London County Council constituency

- Former constituency for the London County Council

Former constituency
- Created: 1949
- Abolished: 1965
- Member(s): 3

Cities of London and Westminster was a constituency used for elections to the London County Council between 1949 and the council's abolition, in 1965. The seat shared boundaries with the UK Parliament constituency of the same name.

== Councillors ==
Year	Name	Party	Name	Party	Name	Party
1949	Henry Brooke	Conservative	Denys Lowson	Conservative	Samuel Isidore Salmon	Conservative
1952	Henry Brooke	Conservative	Ralph Perring	Conservative	Samuel Isidore Salmon	Conservative
1955	John Chapman-Walker	Conservative	Hubert Pitman	Conservative	Samuel Isidore Salmon	Conservative
1958	Victor Goodhew	Conservative	James Miller	Conservative	Samuel Isidore Salmon	Conservative
1961	Alison M. Tennant	Conservative	James Miller	Conservative	Samuel Isidore Salmon	Conservative

== Election results ==
1949 London County Council election: Cities of London and Westminster
Party	Candidate	Votes	%	±%
Conservative	Henry Brooke	25,300		
Conservative	Denys Lowson	24,948		
Conservative	Samuel Isidore Salmon	24,680		
Labour	B. Hamilton	4,886		
Labour	J. J. Curran	4,844		
Labour	D. Clark	4,828		

1952 London County Council election: Cities of London and Westminster
Party	Candidate	Votes	%	±%
Conservative	Henry Brooke	22,674		
Conservative	Ralph Perring	21,987		
Conservative	Samuel Isidore Salmon	21,817		
Labour	B. Hamilton	6,157		
Labour	E. Havers	6,013		
Labour	C. Benjafield	5,751		
Conservative hold		Swing		

1955 London County Council election: Cities of London and Westminster
Party	Candidate	Votes	%	±%
Conservative	Hubert Pitman	17,100		
Conservative	John Chapman-Walker	17,052		
Conservative	Samuel Isidore Salmon	16,883		
Labour	P. H. F. Johnson	3,697		
Labour	J. M. Raynor	3,510		
Labour	R. T. Robinson	3,403		
Conservative hold		Swing		

1958 London County Council election: Cities of London and Westminster
Party	Candidate	Votes	%	±%
Conservative	Victor Goodhew	14,812		
Conservative	James Miller	14,703		
Conservative	Samuel Isidore Salmon	14,636		
Labour	D. A. J. Smith	4,919		
Labour	H. G. Garside	4,890		
Labour	R. Welan	4,776		
Conservative hold		Swing		

1961 London County Council election: Cities of London and Westminster
Party	Candidate	Votes	%	±%
Conservative	James Miller	15,246		
Conservative	Alison M. Tennant	15,206		
Conservative	Samuel Isidore Salmon	15,130		
Labour	A. C. Miles	4,920		
Labour	K. V. Taylor	4,862		
Labour	W. H. Wheeler	4,840		
Liberal	Timothy Beaumont	2,308		
Liberal	Jeremy Mostyn	2,252		
Liberal	Manuela Sykes	2,242		
Conservative hold		Swing		
