= City of London and Westminster South (electoral division) =

Electoral division in Greater London, 1973–1986

- Former electoral division for the Greater London Council
- City of London and Westminster South electoral division boundaries
- District: Westminster and City of London
- Electorate: 53,922 (1973); 51,393 (1977); 50,119 (1981)
- Major settlements: City of London, Westminster
- Area: 1,318 hectares (13.18 km^{2})

Former electoral division
- Created: 1973
- Abolished: 1986
- Member: 1
- Created from: Westminster and the City of London

City of London and Westminster South was an electoral division for the purposes of elections to the Greater London Council. The constituency elected one councillor for a four-year term in 1973, 1977 and 1981, with the final term extended for an extra year ahead of the abolition of the Greater London Council.

== History ==
It was planned to use the same boundaries as the Westminster Parliament constituencies for election of councillors to the Greater London Council (GLC), as had been the practice for elections to the predecessor London County Council, but those that existed in 1965 crossed the Greater London boundary. Until new constituencies could be settled, the 32 London boroughs were used as electoral areas. The City of Westminster was joined with the City of London for this purpose, creating a constituency called Westminster and the City of London. This was used for the Greater London Council elections in 1964, 1967 and 1970.

The new constituencies were settled following the Second Periodic Review of Westminster constituencies and the new electoral division matched the boundaries of the City of London and Westminster South parliamentary constituency.

It covered much of the innermost part of London, including large parts of Central London and the West End of London. The area was in a long-term period of population decline that was yet to reverse. The electorate reduced from 53,922 in 1973 to 50,119 in 1981. It covered an area of 1,318 hectares (13.18 km^{2}).

== Elections ==
The City of London and Westminster South constituency was used for the Greater London Council elections in 1973, 1977 and 1981. One councillor was elected at each election using first-past-the-post voting.

=== 1973 election ===
The fourth election to the GLC (and first using revised boundaries) was held on 12 April 1973. The electorate was 53,922 and one Conservative Party councillor was elected. The turnout was 29.9%. The councillor was elected for a three-year term. This was extended for an extra year in 1976 when the electoral cycle was switched to four-yearly.

1973 Greater London Council election: City of London and Westminster South
Party	Candidate	Votes	%	±%
Conservative	M. N. Scorgie	9,152	46.90	
Labour	P. J. Turner	4,993	25.57	
Liberal	R. W. Jones	4,993	25.57	
Anti-Mass Redevelopment	A Wilson	195	1.00	
Independent	P. A. Clifford	184	0.94	
Turnout				
Conservative win (new seat)				

=== 1977 election ===
The fifth election to the GLC (and second using revised boundaries) was held on 5 May 1977. The electorate was 51,393 and one Conservative Party councillor was elected. The turnout was 30.7%. The councillor was elected for a four-year term.

1977 Greater London Council election: City of London and Westminster South
Party	Candidate	Votes	%	±%
Conservative	M. N. Scorgie	10,250	65.03	
Labour	P. J. Turner	3,153	20.00	
Liberal	A. M. E. Scrimgeour	985	6.25	
GLC Abolitionist Campaign	A. M. Moncreiff	651	4.13	
National Front	S. Attree	463	2.94	
New Britain	S. Attkins	254	1.61	
Turnout				
Conservative hold		Swing		

=== 1981 election ===
The sixth and final election to the GLC (and third using revised boundaries) was held on 7 May 1981. The electorate was 50,119 and one Conservative Party councillor was elected. The turnout was 33.2%. The councillor was elected for a four-year term, extended by an extra year by the Local Government (Interim Provisions) Act 1984, ahead of the abolition of the council.

1981 Greater London Council election: City of London and Westminster South
Party	Candidate	Votes	%	±%
Conservative	David Avery	9,660	58.28	
Labour	Reg Fryer	4,628	27.93	
Liberal	Adrian Walker-Smith	1,807	10.91	
Communist	Jeremy Clark	215	1.30	
Save London Action Group	Alison Furness	178	1.07	
Workers Revolutionary	David Gilbert	87	0.52	
Turnout				
Conservative hold		Swing		
