= Reg Goodwin =

British politician

Sir Reg Goodwin CBE DL

3rd Leader of the Greater London Council
- In office 1973–1977
- Preceded by: Desmond Plummer
- Succeeded by: Horace Cutler

Personal details
- Born: 3 July 1908 London, England
- Died: 29 September 1986 (aged 78) West Sussex, England
- Party: Labour
- Children: 3

Sir Reginald Eustace Goodwin CBE, DL (3 July 1908 – 29 September 1986) was a British politician. He was Leader of the Greater London Council from 1973 to 1977. On the moderate wing of the Labour Party, he favoured public control of utilities.

== Family background ==
Goodwin was from a middle-class family of five and was born in Streatham. He went to Strand School, leaving at 16 to become a tea-buyer for a City firm. In his spare time he worked at the Oxford and Bermondsey Boys' Club, a charity set up by the University of Oxford to help underprivileged boys in Bermondsey, where he then lived. Through this work he became full-time Assistant Secretary of the National Association of Boys' Clubs when it was established in 1934. From 1945 he was its General Secretary.

== Party politics ==
Goodwin joined the Labour Party in 1932, and began his political career when he was elected to Bermondsey Borough Council in 1937.

His administrative ability was noticed and he became Leader of the Council in the 1940s. Meanwhile, he had been elected in Bermondsey West at the 1946 London County Council election, where Labour Leader Sir Isaac Hayward spotted his potential and gave him important committee assignments.

== GLC membership ==
Goodwin became a member of the Greater London Council for Southwark after its first election in 1964 and chaired the Finance Committee in the Labour administration. After the Conservatives won a landslide election victory in 1967 he was chosen as the new Labour Leader almost by default, other more dynamic personalities having been defeated. He was knighted on the recommendation of Harold Wilson in the 1968 New Year Honours and was almost always known as 'Sir Reg' thereafter.

After the second defeat in 1970 Goodwin became more aggressive in his opposition to Sir Desmond Plummer's Conservative GLC. Labour had not opposed the Conservative GLC's policy of building urban motorways in 1970 but by June 1972 Goodwin had been convinced by the strength of public opinion, and said "Labour pledges itself to abandon the disastrous plans to build two motorways which threaten the environment of Central London". He called on the GLC not to enter into contracts to build the motorways so that Londoners could have a choice at the 1973 elections.

At the 1973 elections, the Labour manifesto was drafted by Peter Walker, then Research Officer for the London Labour Party. It had a distinctly left-wing approach favouring subsidies to reduce (possibly eliminate) public transport fares and to build more council homes, but Goodwin supported these policies and gave his backing to the manifesto which was published under the title "A Socialist Strategy for London".

== GLC Leader ==
The Motorway Box issue and commitment to better public transport was the key to Labour's victory in the 1973 election. After the election Sir Reg appointed Peter Walker to head his private office despite protests from the Conservatives and the GLC officers. This was the first ever open political appointment in the history of British local government and soon set the template for other similar appointments.

Sir Reg then changed the whole political decision making process in the GLC, ensuring that officers left after presenting their papers to the Labour cabinet who then made a decision and Peter Walker acted as secretary conveying the decisions to the Officers after going through the Labour group. By this manner Goodwin managed to continue the distinctly green agenda set in the 1973 manifesto despite many economic problems nationally that affected the GLC's finances.

== Financial crisis ==
Soon after the election the increase in inflation during this period caused havoc with the GLC finances. Goodwin was forced to cut investment programmes and increase transport fares and as a result became unpopular with the left. His attempts to conciliate with them caused resignations among the right-wing Labour councillors. Goodwin's exceptionally discreet personal style meant that he was rarely targeted personally, but left him with few political friends.

He was re-elected Leader when Labour lost the 1977 GLC election but few expected him to continue in the post. He announced his resignation very suddenly by leaving 28 copies (one for every member of the Labour Group) of a resignation letter on the desk of the Chief Whip, with a note suggesting he might like to distribute them. On taking his seat on the backbenches he remarked "I'm glad to be sitting here, because fewer of my friends are behind me."

== Deselection ==
Goodwin's own constituency party in Bermondsey had swung to the left. Although they wished him well personally and respected his contribution, the Bermondsey left insisted on a new candidate for the 1981 election and deselected him. He let his membership of the Labour Party lapse in 1982, but was declared an honorary member on 21 February 1983.

== Personal life ==
Goodwin and his wife, Pen, had three children. He died at a nursing home in West Sussex on 29 September 1986, aged 78, after a long illness.

Political offices
Preceded by Sir Desmond Plummer	Leader of the Greater London Council; 1973-1977	Succeeded by Sir Horace Cutler
Preceded by Norman Prichard	Chairman of the Finance Committee of London County Council; 1961–1965	Succeeded by Council abolished
Preceded by New position	Chairman of the Finance Committee of the Greater London Council; 1964–1967	Succeeded by Louis Gluckstein
Party political offices
Preceded by Bill Fiske	Leader of the Labour Party on the Greater London Council; 1967–1980	Succeeded by Andrew McIntosh
