= Desmond Plummer =

British politician

The Right Honourable The Lord Plummer of St Marylebone TD DL FRSA
- 1970 portrait

2nd Leader of the Greater London Council
- In office 1967–1973
- Preceded by: Bill Fiske
- Succeeded by: Reg Goodwin

Member of the House of Lords
- Lord Temporal
- Life peerage 29 May 1981 – 2 October 2009

Personal details
- Born: Arthur Desmond Herne Plummer; 25 May 1914 Temple Fortune, Middlesex, England
- Died: 2 October 2009 (aged 95) St. John's Wood, London, England
- Party: Conservative
- Spouse: Pat Holloway (m. 1941; died 1998)
- Children: 1

Arthur Desmond Herne Plummer, Baron Plummer of St Marylebone, TD, DL, FRSA (25 May 1914 – 2 October 2009) was a British Conservative Party politician in London and the longest serving Leader of the Greater London Council 1967–1973.

== Education and military service ==
Plummer went to Hurstpierpoint College and the College of Estate Management. He qualified as a Surveyor but his career was curtailed by World War II where he served with the Royal Engineers leaving with the rank of Major. In 1950 he was awarded the Territorial Decoration for long service in the Territorial Army, and he was a member of the Territorial Army Sports Board from 1953 until 1979.

== Political career ==
Plummer was elected to St. Marylebone Borough Council in May 1952 and served as Mayor of the Borough in 1958. He was selected as a Conservative candidate for a byelection to the London County Council in St Marylebone in 1960, and returned unopposed for the safe seat. He was elected to its successor, the Greater London Council, in 1964 for Westminster and the City of London and in 1973 for St Marylebone.

By 1966 Plummer was chosen as Leader of the Opposition in succession to Sir Percy Rugg, just a year before the GLC elections. With Harold Wilson's Labour Government growing ever more unpopular he won a landslide victory in 1967. One of Plummer's first acts was the official opening of the Southbound Blackwall Tunnel, as witnessed by an inscription on its entrance . His GLC pioneered the sale of council housing, and negotiated from the Government the power to run the London Underground and the rest of London Transport in 1969. The Conservatives were re-elected under Plummer in 1970 a few weeks before the general election, although Labour regained control of the Inner London Education Authority. Plummer was the only Leader of the GLC to get a second term. He was knighted in 1971.

However, the second term saw the GLC embark on a highly controversial policy over urban transport. Plummer believed that London's streets, constructed before the car, were insufficient to cope with the growing traffic, and proposed to deal with the problem by creating urban Motorways in the 'Motorway Box'. The GLC would compulsorily purchase homes and construct three separate ring roads. Although previous administrations had built short stretches of motorway, this was the first comprehensive policy. The first stretch to be built was the Westway from Marylebone to Acton, which involved the demolition of thousands of homes and building a large concrete flyover which continues to be the major route into central London from the west. Residents in areas where the new motorways were to go declared their firm opposition, and the Labour opposition pledged to scrap the schemes and instead subsidise public transport. This, combined with the difficulties of Edward Heath's Conservative government, led to Plummer and the Conservatives being voted out in 1973.

Plummer had a series of prominent posts within the Conservative Party. He had already been Chairman of his own Association in 1965, and served on the Executive of the National Union of Conservative and Unionist Associations from 1967 to 1976. When defeated, he was appointed Chairman of the Horserace Betting Levy Board in 1974. Plummer resigned the Leadership of the Conservative Group on the GLC that year, to be succeeded by Horace Cutler, and resigned from the Council in 1976.

== Business ==
He resumed his business career, becoming a member of Lloyd's of London and Chairman of the Portman Building Society. He also took up the job of President of the Political Committee of the Carlton Club, the leading Conservative club, from 1979 to 1984.

== Personal ==
Plummer was born in Temple Fortune, north London. In 1941, he married Pat Holloway. They had one child, a daughter. The couple remained together until her death in 1998.

He was created a life peer on 29 May 1981 as Baron Plummer of St Marylebone in the City of Westminster. Plummer lived in St John's Wood later in life, and he continued to work and to attend the House of Lords well into his final years. He was not, as some authors have said, an angler but a supporter of making the Thames clean and took an active interest in the angling clubs on the river.

Plummer died at St John's Hospice in London on 2 October 2009, at the age of 95.

== Arms ==
Coat of arms of Desmond Plummer
Coronet Coronet of a baron Crest On the Battlements of a Tower proper two Surveyor's Ranging Rods in saltire compony Argent and Gules enfiling a Stirrup argent Escutcheon Barry wavy Argent and Azure on a Chief Vert three Stirrups Argent Supporters On either side a Heron proper standing on a Grassy Mount proper and extending the inner leg above a Portcullis chained Gold and set amid Madonna Lilies growing from each mount also proper Motto Erectus Non Elatus (Exalted but not haughty)

Political offices
Preceded by Bill Fiske	Leader of the Greater London Council; 1967–1973	Succeeded by Sir Reg Goodwin
Party political offices
Preceded by Percy Rugg	Leader of the Conservative Party on the Greater London Council; 1966–1974	Succeeded by Horace Cutler
