= Ferndale (Lambeth ward) =

Electoral ward in Lambeth, London, England (1965-2022)

Coordinates: 51.461°N 0.123°W

- Former electoral ward for the Lambeth London Borough Council
- Ferndale ward boundaries from 2002 to 2022
- Borough: Lambeth
- County: Greater London
- Population: 15,032 (2011)
- Electorate: 12,100 (2018)
- Major settlements: Brixton
- Area: 0.8507 square kilometres (0.3285 sq mi)

Former electoral ward
- Created: 1965
- Abolished: 2022
- Member: 3
- Replaced by: Brixton Acre Lane; Brixton North; Clapham East
- ONS code: 00AYGE
- GSS code: E05000421

Ferndale was an electoral ward in the London Borough of Lambeth from 1965 to 2022. The ward was first used in the 1964 elections and last used for the 2018 elections. It returned three councillors to Lambeth London Borough Council. The boundaries were redrawn in 1978 and 2002. The ward was replaced in 2022 by Brixton Acre Lane, Brixton North and Clapham East. Notable councillors to represent the ward are John Major who became Prime Minister of the United Kingdom, civil rights activist Rudy Narayan and Ted Knight who was leader of Lambeth Council during the 1985 rate-capping rebellion.

== List of councillors ==
Term	Councillor	Party
1964–1968; 1971–197?	Donald Packer	Labour
1964–1968	D. Colls	Labour
1964–1968	W. Privett	Labour
1968–1971	J. Langley	Conservative
1968–1971	G. Allnut	Conservative
1968–1971	John Major	Conservative
1971–1974	L. Davis	Labour
1971–197?	Moses Kempadoo	Labour
1974–1978	Rudy Narayan	Labour
1976–1978	Angela Painter	Labour
1978–1984	Peter Lansley	Labour
1978–1982	John Boyle	Labour
1978–1986	Ted Knight (Note: Ted Knight was a councillor for Knight's Hill ward from 1974 to 1978.)	Labour
1982–1986	Josephine Sinclair	Labour
1984–1986	Irma Critchlow	Labour
1986–1994	Julian Lewis	Labour
1986–1990	Joshua Anim	Labour
1986–1990	Rachael Webb	Labour
1990–1995	Denis Cooper-King	Labour
1990–1994	Abayomi Buraimoh-lgbo	Labour
1994–1995	John Harrison	Labour
1994–1998	Timothy Murnaghan	Labour
1995–1998	Simon Adams	Labour
1995–2002	Mohammed Abu-Bakr	Labour
1998–2002	Richard Jarman	Labour
1998–2018	Paul McGlone	Labour
2002–2006	Imran Hussain	Labour
2002–2018	Sally Prentice	Labour
2006–2018	Neil Sabharwal	Labour
2018–2022	Jess Leigh	Labour
2018–2022	Joshua Lindsey	Labour
2018–2022	Irfan Mohammed	Labour

== 2002–2022 Lambeth council elections ==
There was a revision of ward boundaries in Lambeth in 2002.

=== 2018 election ===
The election took place on 3 May 2018.

2018 Lambeth London Borough Council election: Ferndale
Party	Candidate	Votes	%	±%
Labour Co-op	Jess Leigh	1,853		
Labour Co-op	Joshua Lindsey	1,685		
Labour Co-op	Irfan Mohammed	1,649		
Green	Rachel Alexander	715		
Green	Indar Picton-Howell	459		
Liberal Democrats	Ben Austin	455		
Liberal Democrats	Aedan Pope	428		
Conservative	Craig Barrett	373		
Conservative	Katy Slack	384		
Women's Equality	Leila Fazal	366		
Conservative	David Richardson	359		
Liberal Democrats	John Siraut	263		
Majority		934		
Turnout				
Labour Co-op hold		Swing		
Labour Co-op hold		Swing		
Labour Co-op hold		Swing		

=== 2014 election ===
The election took place on 22 May 2014.

2014 Lambeth London Borough Council election: Ferndale
Party	Candidate	Votes	%	±%
Labour	Sally Prentice	1,762	50.0	
Labour	Paul McGlone	1,696		
Labour	Neil Sabharwal	1,499		
Green	Edward Gillespie	625	17.7	
Green	Philip Woolley	619		
Conservative	Thomas Hatton	493	14.0	
Conservative	Paul Mawdsley	444		
Conservative	Michael Timmins	431		
Liberal Democrats	Jane Vaus	256	7.3	
Liberal Democrats	Michael Tuffrey	221		
Liberal Democrats	John Medway	211		
UKIP	Elizabeth Erwin Jones	196	5.6	
TUSC	James Ivens	113	3.2	
Socialist (GB)	Daniel Lambert	81	2.3	
Total votes		8,647		
Labour hold		Swing		
Labour hold		Swing		
Labour hold		Swing		

=== 2010 election ===
The election on 6 May 2010 took place on the same day as the United Kingdom general election.

2010 Lambeth London Borough Council election: Ferndale
Party	Candidate	Votes	%	±%
Labour	Paul McGlone	2,761		
Labour	Sally Prentice	2,703		
Labour	Neil Sabharwal	2,377		
Liberal Democrats	Ernest Baidoo-Mitchell	1,383		
Liberal Democrats	Roy Jenkins	1,367		
Liberal Democrats	Geoffrey Bowring	1,313		
Conservative	Isabella Ginnett	1,199		
Conservative	Lee Roberts	1,053		
Conservative	Richard Moore	1,052		
Green	Tamsyn East	632		
Green	Daniel Bracken	613		
Green	James Montgomery	525		
Socialist (GB)	Daniel Lambert	82		
Socialist (GB)	John Lee	48		
Socialist (GB)	Jacqueline Shodeke	45		
Total votes		17,153		
Labour hold		Swing		
Labour hold		Swing		
Labour hold		Swing		

=== 2006 election ===
The election took place on 4 May 2006.

2006 Lambeth London Borough Council election: Ferndale
Party	Candidate	Votes	%	±%
Labour	Paul McGlone	1,332	47.9	
Labour	Sally Prentice	1,282		
Labour	Neil Sabharwal	1,205		
Liberal Democrats	Lena Smith	572	20.6	
Liberal Democrats	Mirza Basic	559		
Liberal Democrats	Marcus Mayers	535		
Green	Philip Georgiou	507	18.2	
Conservative	Helen Gentry	371	13.3	
Conservative	David Farley	343		
Conservative	Rosemary Morales	331		
Total votes		7,037		
Labour hold		Swing		
Labour hold		Swing		
Labour hold		Swing		

=== 2002 election ===
The election took place on 2 May 2002.

2002 Lambeth London Borough Council election: Ferndale
Party	Candidate	Votes	%	±%
Labour	Imran Hussain	1,031	21.5	
Labour	Paul McGlone	1,021	21.3	
Labour	Sally Prentice	977	20.4	
Liberal Democrats	Catherine Cumberbatch-Barnett	340	7.1	
Liberal Democrats	Patrick Mitchell	314	6.6	
Green	Jeffrey Dalton	300	6.3	
Liberal Democrats	Steven Rhodes	300	6.3	
Conservative	Helen Gentry	171	3.6	
Conservative	Richard Forsdyke	170	3.5	
Conservative	Verity Forsdyke	167	3.5	
Turnout		4,791	17.6	
Labour win (new boundaries)				
Labour win (new boundaries)				
Labour win (new boundaries)				

== 1978–2002 Lambeth council elections ==
Ferndale ward boundaries from 1978 to 2002

There was a revision of ward boundaries in Lambeth in 1978.

=== 1998 election ===
The election took place on 7 May 1998.

=== 1995 by-election ===
The by-election took place on 2 March 1995, following the resignations of Denis Cooper-King and John Harrison.

1995 Ferndale by-election
Party	Candidate	Votes	%	±%
Labour	Simon Adams	982		
Labour	Mohammed Abu-Bakr	963		
Liberal Democrats	Euan Bayliss	846		
Liberal Democrats	Martin Morris	824		
Independent	Catherine Valentine	155		
Conservative	Alison Davis	129		
Independent	Raymond Woolford	129		
Conservative	Simon Nayyar	100		
Turnout				
Labour hold		Swing		
Labour hold		Swing		

=== 1994 election ===
The election took place on 5 May 1994.

=== 1990 election ===
The election took place on 3 May 1990.

=== 1986 election ===
The election took place on 8 May 1986.

1986 Lambeth London Borough Council election: Ferndale
Party	Candidate	Votes	%	±%
Labour	Julian Lewis	2,149		
Labour	Joshua Anim	1,973		
Labour	Rachael Webb	1,910		
Conservative	Peter Donovan	563		
Conservative	David Jones	548		
Conservative	Nicholas de Salis	504		
Alliance	Brian Seymour	406		
Alliance	Alastair Sturgis	392		
Alliance	Herrnia Esezobor	391		
Green	Janice Owens	212		
Communist	Brenda Kirsch	61		
Revolutionary Communist	Kunle Oluremi	51		
Total votes				
Labour hold		Swing		
Labour hold		Swing		
Labour hold		Swing		

=== 1984 by-election ===
The by-election took place on 17 May 1984, following the resignation of Peter Lansley.

1984 Ferndale by-election
Party	Candidate	Votes	%	±%
Labour	Irma Critchlow	1,563		
Alliance	Paul Harris	1,012		
Conservative	Clive Mark	246		
Communist	Paul Olive	65		
Ecology	Janice Owens	48		
Total votes				
Labour hold		Swing		

=== 1982 election ===
The election took place on 6 May 1982.

1982 Lambeth London Borough Council election: Ferndale
Party	Candidate	Votes	%	±%
Labour	Ted Knight	1,504		
Labour	Peter Lansley	1,391		
Labour	Josephine Sinclair	1,366		
Alliance	Gabriel Solomon	978		
Alliance	Nicholas Couldroey	961		
Alliance	David Warner	933		
Conservative	Margaret Chambers	528		
Conservative	Dilip Vadgama	488		
Conservative	Irene Bird	461		
Communist	Jean Styles	132		
Total votes				
Labour hold		Swing		
Labour hold		Swing		
Labour hold		Swing		

=== 1978 election ===
The election took place on 4 May 1978.

1978 Lambeth London Borough Council election: Ferndale
Party	Candidate	Votes	%	±%
Labour	Peter Lansley	1,640		
Labour	John Boyle	1,444		
Labour	Ted Knight	1,444		
Conservative	Gillian Turner	722		
Conservative	Peter Warburton-Jones	708		
Conservative	Mark Robinson	673		
Turnout				
Labour win (new boundaries)				
Labour win (new boundaries)				
Labour win (new boundaries)				

== 1964–1978 Lambeth council elections ==
External image
- Ferndale ward boundaries from 1965 to 1978

Ferndale ward existed since the creation of the London Borough of Lambeth on 1 April 1965. For elections to the Greater London Council, the ward was part of the Lambeth electoral division from 1965 and then the Vauxhall division from 1973.

=== 1976 by-election ===
The by-election took place on 1 April 1976.

1976 Ferndale by-election
Party	Candidate	Votes	%	±%
Labour	Angela Painter	1,026		
Conservative	Charles Williams	513		
Liberal	Catherine Williams	196		
Turnout			21.6	
Labour hold		Swing		

=== 1974 election ===
The election took place on 2 May 1974.

1974 Lambeth London Borough Council election: Ferndale
Party	Candidate	Votes	%	±%
Labour	Donald Packer	888		
Labour	Moses Kempadoo	853		
Labour	Rudy Narayan	822		
Conservative	M. Lingwood	443		
Conservative	I. McLean Young	420		
Conservative	V. Cox	406		
Communist	J. Stewart	105		
Turnout				
Labour hold		Swing		
Labour hold		Swing		
Labour hold		Swing		

=== 1971 election ===
The election took place on 13 May 1971.

1971 Lambeth London Borough Council election: Ferndale
Party	Candidate	Votes	%	±%
Labour	L. Davis	1,574		
Labour	Donald Packer	1,498		
Labour	Moses Kempadoo	1,468		
Conservative	G. Allnutt	498		
Conservative	J. Tosh	497		
Conservative	R. Wheelhouse	480		
Communist	J. Harman	122		
Turnout				
Labour gain from Conservative		Swing		
Labour gain from Conservative		Swing		
Labour gain from Conservative		Swing		

=== 1968 election ===
The election took place on 9 May 1968.

1968 Lambeth London Borough Council election: Ferndale
Party	Candidate	Votes	%	±%
Conservative	J. Langley	1,025		
Conservative	G. Allnut	1,002		
Conservative	John Major	991		
Labour	L. Davis	921		
Labour	J. Dodson	892		
Labour	Donald Packer	863		
Turnout				
Conservative gain from Labour		Swing		
Conservative gain from Labour		Swing		
Conservative gain from Labour		Swing		

=== 1964 election ===
The election took place on 7 May 1964.

1964 Lambeth London Borough Council election: Ferndale
Party	Candidate	Votes	%	±%
Labour	Donald Packer	1,219		
Labour	D. Colls	1,202		
Labour	W. Privett	1,195		
Conservative	D. Hodgson	532		
Conservative	M. Bartholomew	524		
Conservative	A. Baker	518		
Communist	R. Dearing	91		
Turnout				
Labour win (new seat)				
Labour win (new seat)				
Labour win (new seat)				
