= 1981 Greater London Council election =

Local election in England

- 7 May 1981

92 councillors 47 seats needed for a majority
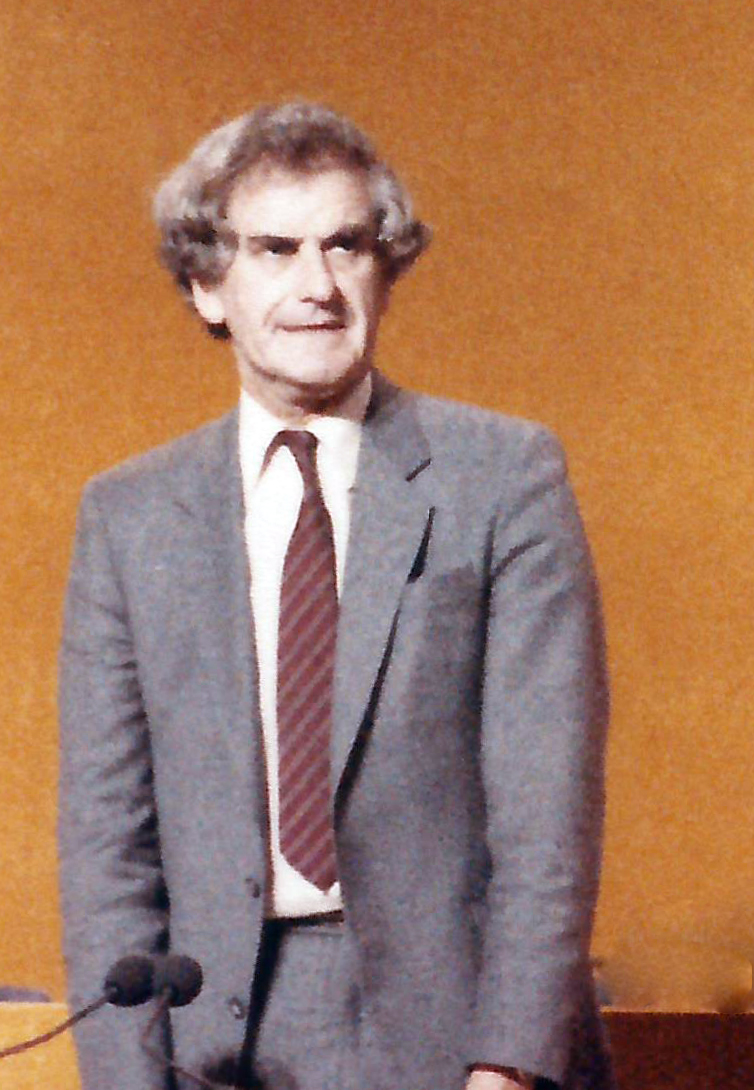
	First party	Second party	Third party
Leader	Andrew McIntosh (Note: Andrew McIntosh led the party into the election. Within 24 hours however McIntosh's leadership was toppled by Ken Livingstone; a member of the party's left wing.)	Horace Cutler	Adrian Slade
Party	Labour	Conservative	Liberal
Leader's seat	Tottenham	Harrow West	Richmond
Seats won	50	41	1
Seat change	▲22	▼23	▲1
Popular vote	939,457	894,234	323,856
Percentage	41.8%	39.7%	14.4%
Swing	▲8.9%	▼12.8%	▲6.6%
- Results by electoral division
Leader before election
Horace Cutler
Conservative
Leader after election
Ken Livingstone
Labour

The sixth election to the Greater London Council (GLC) was held on 7 May 1981. Following the election Andrew McIntosh the leader of the Labour Group was replaced by Ken Livingstone, a member of the party's left-wing. This was the last election to the GLC. The Conservative government of Margaret Thatcher soon decided to abolish the council in the mid-1980s. Following the abolition of the GLC, there was a direct election to the Inner London Education Authority in 1986.

== Electoral arrangements ==
The GLC was elected from 92 single-member electoral divisions which were identical with the Parliamentary constituencies in Greater London. The election date was fixed by section 43 of the Local Government Act 1972 as the first Thursday in May.

Councillors were elected for a four-year term. This was extended for an extra year in 1984 when the elections that had been scheduled for 1985 were cancelled.

== Results ==
The leader of the Labour GLC group Andrew McIntosh led the party into the election. Within 24 hours of the result, however, McIntosh's leadership was toppled by Ken Livingstone; a member of the party's left-wing. Livingstone was then elected GLC leader. The results were as follows (all parties shown):

Party	Votes			Seats			
Party	Number	%	+/-	Stood	Seats	%	+/-
Labour	939,457	41.8	▲8.9	92	50	54.3	▲22
Conservative	894,234	39.7	▼12.8	92	41	44.6	▼23
Liberal	323,856	14.4	▲6.6	89	1	1.1	▲1
National Front	21,582	1.0	▼4.4	41	0	0.0	Steady
Social Democratic Alliance	21,582	1.0	New	10	0	0.0	Steady
Ecology	17,515	0.8	▲0.7	38	0	0.0	Steady
Independent	7,763	0.3	▲0.2	25	0	0.0	Steady
NNF	5,877	0.3	New	18	0	0.0	Steady
Communist	5,275	0.2	▼0.1	16	0	0.0	Steady
Constitutional Movement	4,857	0.2	New	23	0	0.0	Steady
Workers Revolutionary	2,753	0.1	New	16	0	0.0	Steady
Save London Action Group	1,727	0.1	New	13	0	0.0	Steady
Abolish the GLC	1,158	0.1	▼0.3	7	0	0.0	Steady
Irish National Party	793	0.0	New	3	0	0.0	Steady
Fellowship	637	0.0	Steady	1	0	0.0	Steady
Ind. Conservative	362	0.0	Steady	1	0	0.0	Steady
New Britain	346	0.0	Steady	1	0	0.0	Steady
Workers (Leninist)	145	0.0	New	1	0	0.0	Steady
Revolutionary Communist	116	0.0	New	1	0	0.0	Steady
Socialist (GB)	83	0.0	Steady	1	0	0.0	Steady
Total	2,250,118			489	92		

== Constituency results ==
Member of the old council*

=== Barking and Dagenham ===
Barking
Party	Candidate	Votes	%	±%
Labour	John Benjamin Ward	12,528	61.6%	−3.2%
Conservative	Ronald A Smith	4,357	21.4%	−6.5%
Liberal	Mrs Ronwen R Beadle	2,803	13.8%	+4.7%
National Front	Ian R Newport	555	2.7%	−8.5%
Constitutional Movement	Brian F White	104	0.5%	N/A
Majority		8171	40.2%	−9.7%
Turnout		20347		
Labour hold		Swing		

Dagenham
Party	Candidate	Votes	%	±%
Labour	Harry Kay*	15,134	61.2%	
Conservative	Mrs Judith A Warner	4,875	19.7%	
Liberal	David C Smith	3,508	14.2%	
National Front	Ronald A Ferrett	753	3.0%	
Communist	Daniel Connor	259	1.0%	
Constitutional Movement	Michael D Sowerby	210	0.8%	
Majority		10259	41.5%	
Turnout		24739		
Labour hold		Swing		

=== Barnet ===
Chipping Barnet
Party	Candidate	Votes	%	±%
Conservative	John Reveley Major	13,056	61.2%	
Labour	Steven L Powell	5,754	27.0%	
Liberal	Mrs Jean W Hawkins	4,003	18.8%	
Ecology	Timothy H Cooper	859	4.0%	
Majority		7302	34.2%	
Turnout		21326		
Conservative hold		Swing		

Finchley
Party	Candidate	Votes	%	±%
Conservative	Neville Beale	10,710	46.5%	
Labour	Thomas McKendry	8,991	39.0%	
Liberal	Christopher Perkin	2,702	11.7%	
Ecology	Maureen T Colmans	525	2.3%	
Abolish the GLC	Andrew M Moncreiff	113	0.5%	
Majority		1719	7.5%	
Turnout		23041		
Conservative hold		Swing		

Hendon North
Party	Candidate	Votes	%	±%
Conservative	Bryan Michael Deece Cassidy	10,904	45.7%	
Labour	Frank Arthur Cooper	10,289	43.2%	
Liberal	Leonard W Watkins	2,643	11.1%	
Majority		615	2.6%	
Turnout		23836		
Conservative hold		Swing		

Hendon South
Party	Candidate	Votes	%	±%
Conservative	Peter Blair Black	9,796	48.2%	
Labour	Montague Miller	6,599	32.5%	
Liberal	Andrew J Bridgwater	3,933	19.3%	
Majority		3197	15.7%	
Turnout		20328		
Conservative hold		Swing		

=== Bexley ===
Bexleyheath
Party	Candidate	Votes	%	±%
Conservative	Victor Rae Muske Langton*	11,087	45.1%	
Labour	James A Dawson	8,562	34.9%	
Liberal	Colin E Wright	4,550	18.5%	
Ecology	Lynda A Sturrock	389	1.6%	
Majority		2525	10.3%	
Turnout		24588		
Conservative hold		Swing		

Erith & Crayford
Party	Candidate	Votes	%	±%
Labour	Elgar Handy	15,085	52.3%	
Conservative	Peter R C Davies	10,239	35.8%	
Liberal	Sidney William Frank Saltmarsh	2,983	10.3%	
NFCM	Owen Hawke	559	1.9%	
Majority		4846	16.8%	
Turnout		28866		
Labour gain from Conservative		Swing		

Sidcup
Party	Candidate	Votes	%	±%
Conservative	Rodney Charles Gent*	12,869	54.4%	
Labour	Audrey M Martin	7,190	30.4%	
Liberal	Gillian V Scott	3,596	15.2%	
Majority		5679	24.0%	
Turnout		23655		
Conservative hold		Swing		

=== Brent ===
Brent East
Party	Candidate	Votes	%	±%
Labour	Norman Howard	14,399	63.4%	
Conservative	Arthur R Steel	7,181	31.6%	
Workers Revolutionary	Gerald J Downing	434	1.9%	
Ind. Conservative	Gerard Pierre-Michel	362	1.6%	
Constitutional Movement	Raymond J Marsh	328	1.4%	
Majority		7218	31.8%	
Turnout		22704		
Labour hold		Swing		

Brent North
Party	Candidate	Votes	%	±%
Conservative	Alan Hardy	17,602	53.2%	
Labour	Lawrence M Nerva	11,165	33.8%	
Liberal	Mrs Ann S Arthur	4,072	12.3%	
Constitutional Movement	Michael Stubbs	226	0.7%	
Majority		6437	19.5%	
Turnout		33065		
Conservative hold		Swing		

Brent South
Party	Candidate	Votes	%	±%
Labour	Illtyd Harrington	16,827	67.1%	
Conservative	Sujan S Raizada	4,365	17.4%	
Liberal	John H Gover	3,316	13.2%	
Workers Revolutionary	Robert P Myers	399	1.6%	
Constitutional Movement	Roger Tainton	165	0.7%	
Majority		12462	49.7%	
Turnout		25072		
Labour hold		Swing		

=== Bromley ===
Beckenham
Party	Candidate	Votes	%	±%
Conservative	Simon James Crawford Randall	12,822	51.2%	
Labour	Paul H Brown	5,980	23.9%	
Liberal	William Alan Macdonald MacCormick	5,390	21.5%	
Ecology	John W Taylor	576	2.3%	
NNF	Terence Cavin-Fitzgerald	262	1.0%	
Majority		6842	27.3%	
Turnout		25030		
Conservative hold		Swing		

Chislehurst
Party	Candidate	Votes	%	±%
Conservative	Joan Kathleen Wykes*	13,226	50.7%	
Labour	Walter Kenneth Mansfield	9,019	34.6%	
Liberal	Michael F Deves	3,022	11.6%	
Ecology	Hugh G Duncan	527	2.0%	
NNF	Alfred Waite	309	1.2%	
Majority		4207	16.1%	
Turnout		26103		
Conservative hold		Swing		

Orpington
Party	Candidate	Votes	%	±%
Conservative	Jean Tatham*	17,210	50.5%	
Liberal	John C A Sachs	11,325	33.2%	
Labour	Keith R Morton	4,704	13.8%	
Ecology	Richard G Connor	503	1.5%	
NNF	Leslie T Taylor	325	1.0%	
Majority		5885	17.3%	
Turnout		34067		
Conservative hold		Swing		

Ravensbourne
Party	Candidate	Votes	%	±%
Conservative	Michael John Wheeler*	12,099	57.8%	
Labour	John Richard Holbrook	4,187	20.0%	
Liberal	Ronald Lawrence Coverson	3,760	18.0%	
Ecology	Peter J Greenwood	595	2.8%	
NNF	Mrs Bridget Smoker	175	0.8%	
Abolition of Rates	Frank H. Hansford-Miller	102	0.5%	
Majority		7912	37.8%	
Turnout		20918		
Conservative hold		Swing		

=== Camden ===
Hampstead
Party	Candidate	Votes	%	±%
Conservative	Alan David Greengross	12,367	44.7%	
Labour	Miss Margaret A V Bowman	10,446	37.8%	
Liberal	Roger G Billins	4,095	14.8%	
Ecology	Iain M Huddleston	677	2.4%	
Save London Action Group	Anthony B P Mockler	73	0.3%	
Majority		1921	6.9%	
Turnout		27658		
Conservative hold		Swing		

Holborn & St Pancras South
Party	Candidate	Votes	%	±%
Labour	Charles Andrew Rossi	7,796	52.8%	
Conservative	Richard G Bull	5,051	34.2%	
Liberal	Roger Karn	1,694	11.5%	
Constitutional Movement	Paul T Kavanagh	218	1.5%	
Majority		2745	18.6%	
Turnout		14759		
Labour hold		Swing		

St Pancras North
Party	Candidate	Votes	%	±%
Labour	Anne Hallowell Sofer	9,935	59.2%	
Conservative	Ian Pasley-Tyler	5,202	31.0%	
Liberal	Dennis G Strojwas	1,506	9.0%	
Workers Revolutionary	Cornelius P Murphy	148	0.9%	
Majority		4733	28.2%	
Turnout		16791		
Labour hold		Swing		

=== Croydon ===
Croydon Central
Party	Candidate	Votes	%	±%
Conservative	Robert Gurth Hughes	14,058	48.1%	
Labour	John K P Evers	11,231	38.4%	
Liberal	Patrick S Ryan	3,947	13.5%	
Majority		2827	9.7%	
Turnout		29236		
Conservative hold		Swing		

Croydon North East
Party	Candidate	Votes	%	±%
Conservative	Arthur James Rolfe	11,486	47.3%	
Labour	Peter L Spalding	9,308	38.3%	
Liberal	Leslie Anthony Rowe	3,506	14.4%	
Majority		2178	9.0%	
Turnout		24300		
Conservative hold		Swing		

Croydon North West
Party	Candidate	Votes	%	±%
Conservative	Stephen James Stewart	10,891	44.9%	
Labour	Mrs Mary M Walker	10,072	41.6%	
Liberal	William Henry Pitt	2,878	11.9%	
National Front	Keith E J Martin	395	1.6%	
Majority		819	3.4%	
Turnout		24236		
Conservative hold		Swing		

Croydon South
Party	Candidate	Votes	%	±%
Conservative	Peter Stuart Gill	17,340	65.4%	
Liberal	Donald G Pratt	5,709	21.5%	
Labour	Michael P J Phelan	3,485	13.2%	
Majority		11631	43.8%	
Turnout		26534		
Conservative hold		Swing		

=== Ealing ===
Acton
Party	Candidate	Votes	%	±%
Conservative	John Chaytor Dobson*	12,599	47.2%	
Labour	Jennifer Fletcher	10,208	38.2%	
Liberal	Simon James Rowley	2,918	10.9%	
Ecology	Paul Gorka	310	1.2%	n/a
Irish National Party	James O'Leary	214	0.8%	n/a
Save London Action Group	Helen M Elliott	182	0.7%	n/a
Communist	Jerome C Spring	139	0.5%	
Workers Revolutionary	Martin Larkin	118	0.4%	n/a
Majority		2391	9.0%	
Turnout		26688		
Conservative hold		Swing		

Ealing North
Party	Candidate	Votes	%	±%
Labour	Gareth John Daniel	16,681	42.0%	
Conservative	Sir Malby Sturges Crofton*	16,297	41.0%	
Liberal	Brian R Pollock	5,702	14.5%	
NNF	James Shaw	500	1.2%	
Irish National Party	Daniel P O'Brien	235	0.6%	n/a
Independent Protect Individual Rights	John A Torrence	164	0.4%	n/a
Constitutional Movement	John A Murphy	159	0.4%	n/a
Majority		384	1.0%	
Turnout		39738		
Labour gain from Conservative		Swing		

Southall
Party	Candidate	Votes	%	±%
Labour	Yvonne Sieve*	16,714	51.1%	
Conservative	Robin J P Wheatley	8,419	25.7%	
Liberal	Eric Reginald Lubbock	2,804	8.6%	
Independent Southall Mr Clean	Shambu D Gupta	2,619	8.0%	n/a
Communist	Vishnu D Sharma	872	2.7%	n/a
National Front	Ernest Pendrous	569	1.7%	
Irish National Party	Mrs Bridget G O'Leary	344	1.1%	n/a
Workers Revolutionary	Peter P Doraisamy	134	0.4%	n/a
Constitutional Movement	Richard Franklin	132	0.4%	n/a
Rebublican Party	Sohan L Bodh	111	0.3%	n/a
Majority		7755	23.7%	
Turnout		32718		
Labour hold		Swing		

=== Enfield ===
Edmonton
Party	Candidate	Votes	%	±%
Labour	Kenneth Watson Little	13,831	55.6%	
Conservative	Ellen E Saul	7,813	31.4%	
Liberal	Barbara G Adams	2,360	9.5%	
NNF	David J Bruce	496	2.0%	
Abolish the GLC	Pamela J Adams	235	0.9%	
Constitutional Movement	David Izzard	145	0.6%	
Majority		6018	24.2%	
Turnout		24880		
Labour hold		Swing		

Enfield North
Party	Candidate	Votes	%	±%
Labour	Anthony McBrearty	12,994	42.8%	
Conservative	John Alfred Boris Connors*	12,249	40.3%	
Liberal	David R Affleck	3,982	13.1%	
Ecology	David J Merryweather	446	1.5%	
NNF	David G Robinson	377	1.2%	
Abolish the GLC	Dennis J E Keighley	186	0.6%	
Constitutional Movement	Ramon P Johns	130	0.4%	
Majority		745	2.5%	
Turnout		30364		
Labour gain from Conservative		Swing		

Southgate
Party	Candidate	Votes	%	±%
Conservative	Rachel Trixie Anne Gardner	17,535	59.4%	
Labour	Miss Gladys E M Stanbridge	7,141	24.2%	
Liberal	Alan M Abrahams	3,997	13.5%	
NNF	Mark W Lavine	334	1.1%	
Abolish the GLC	Colin Sibley	330	1.1%	
Constitutional Movement	Mrs Janice E Izzard	189	0.6%	
Majority		10394	35.2%	
Turnout		29526		
Conservative hold		Swing		

=== Greenwich ===
Greenwich
Party	Candidate	Votes	%	±%
Labour	Deirdre Frances Mary Wood	12,857	56.5%	
Conservative	Peter J Bassett	6,571	28.9%	
Liberal	Anthony J W Renouf	2,001	8.8%	
Fellowship	Ronald Stephen Mallone	637	2.8%	
National Front	Leslie Bristo	319	1.4%	
NNF	June R Dunster	225	1.0%	
Abolition of Rates	Phyllis Hansford-Miller	129	0.6%	
Majority		6286	27.6%	
Turnout		22739		
Labour hold		Swing		

Woolwich East
Party	Candidate	Votes	%	±%
Labour	Mair Eluned Garside	14,596	65.1%	
Conservative	David Arthur Stephen Tredinnick	4,920	21.6%	
Liberal	David J Hall	2,094	9.3%	
Ecology	Nicholas P F Drey	260	1.2%	
National Front	Frank S Hitches	190	0.8%	
NNF	Henry E Dunster	186	0.8%	
Workers Revolutionary	Alan Clark	169	0.8%	
Majority		9676	43.2%	
Turnout		22415		
Labour hold		Swing		

Woolwich West
Party	Candidate	Votes	%	±%
Labour	Neil Davies	14,431	48.5%	
Conservative	David Glynn Ashby*	11,522	38.7%	
Liberal	Edward J Randall	3,034	10.2%	
Ecology	David R Daniels	399	1.3%	
National Front	William J Lovell	241	0.8%	
NNF	Sidney L Skeggs	117	0.4%	
Majority		2909	9.8%	
Turnout		29744		
Labour gain from Conservative		Swing		

=== Hackney ===
Hackney Central
Party	Candidate	Votes	%	±%
Labour	John Adam Carr	11,402	70.0%	
Conservative	James C Murphy	2,684	16.5%	
Communist	Leslie Jones	611	3.8%	
National Front	John D Field	564	3.5%	
Independent	Augustus Wodhams	521	3.2%	n/a
Enoch Powell is Right	Robin May	504	3.1%	n/a
Majority		8718	53.5%	
Turnout		16286		
Labour hold		Swing		

Hackney North & Stoke Newington
Party	Candidate	Votes	%	±%
Labour Co-op	Gerald Ross	10,045	58.1%	
Conservative	Leslie R. House	3,592	20.8%	
Liberal	Maurice S. Owen	2,243	13.0%	
Communist	Monty Goldman	444	2.6%	
Enoch Powell is Right	Sylvia May	341	2.0%	n/a
National Front	Ralph Ashton	192	1.1%	
East London Workers Against Racism	Joan Lalmont	187	1.1%	n/a
Workers Revolutionary	William P. Rogers	159	0.9%	n/a
Independent	Goksel Hassan	101	0.6%	n/a
Majority		6453	37.3%	
Turnout		17304		
Labour hold		Swing		

Hackney South & Shoreditch
Party	Candidate	Votes	%	±%
Labour	Joan Margaret Morgan*	8,410	57.1%	
Liberal	Stephen J C Walkley	2,585	17.6%	
Conservative	Bernard Lansman	2,287	15.5%	
National Front	Gerald Viner	636	4.3%	
Enoch Powell is Right	George Williams	399	2.7%	n/a
Communist	Helen L Rosenthal	321	2.2%	n/a
Workers Revolutionary	Peter Curtis	86	0.6%	n/a
Majority		5825	39.6%	
Turnout		14724		
Labour hold		Swing		

=== Hammersmith and Fulham ===
Fulham
Party	Candidate	Votes	%	±%
Labour	Barrington John Stead	13,304	45.4%	
Conservative	John Charles Putnam*	12,537	42.8%	
Liberal	William George Wintle	2,625	9.0%	
Ecology	Roger J Coward	386	1.3%	
National Front	Alistair I S Cameron	282	1.0%	
Save London Action Group	Ms Linda Hobbs	102	0.3%	
Abolish the GLC	Colin R Box	68	0.2%	
Majority		767	2.6%	
Turnout		29304		
Labour gain from Conservative		Swing		

Hammersmith North
Party	Candidate	Votes	%	±%
Labour	David Christopher Wetzel	11,882	52.6%	
Conservative	William Christopher Smith*	7,544	29.0%	
Liberal	Miss Margaret A Connaughton	2,009	8.9%	
Ecology	Deborah M Sutherland	571	2.5%	
National Front	Robert L J Pearse	384	1.7%	
Save London Action Group	David A M Constable	194	0.9%	
Majority		4338	19.2%	
Turnout		22584		
Labour gain from Conservative		Swing		

=== Haringey ===
Hornsey
Party	Candidate	Votes	%	±%
Labour	Anthony Bernard Hart	12,311	44.5%	
Conservative	Christopher Hannington	11,758	42.5%	
Liberal	Richard D Kennard	2,870	10.4%	
Ecology	Miriam F Daus	740	2.7%	
Majority		553	2.0%	
Turnout		26769		
Labour hold		Swing		

Tottenham
Party	Candidate	Votes	%	±%
Labour	Andrew Robert McIntosh	10,775	64.7%	
Conservative	Alan T Amos	3,802	22.8%	
Liberal	Katherine Alexander	1,605	9.6%	
Constitutional Movement	Alexander Clark	277	1.7%	
Workers Revolutionary	Richard D Goldstein	189	1.1%	
Majority		6973	41.9%	
Turnout		16648		
Labour hold		Swing		

Wood Green
Party	Candidate	Votes	%	±%
Labour	Michael Ward	10,908	50.1%	
Conservative	Jenefer Gwendolen Anne Riley*	8,159	37.5%	
Liberal	Alan N Sherwell	2,010	9.2%	
National Front	Anthony J Deboise	359	1.6%	
New Britain	Robert G Pritchard	346	1.6%	
Majority		2749	12.6%	
Turnout		21782		
Labour gain from Conservative		Swing		

=== Harrow ===
Harrow Central
Party	Candidate	Votes	%	±%
Conservative	Jill Elizabeth Clack	8,002	40.4%	
Labour	Alfred H Elderton	6,618	33.4%	
Liberal	Stephen B A F H Giles-Medhurst	5,107	25.6%	
Independent Labour	Edward J O Hixon	103	0.5%	n/a
Majority		1384	7.0%	
Turnout				
Conservative hold		Swing		

Harrow East
Party	Candidate	Votes	%	±%
Conservative	Harold Trevor Mote*	10,678	46.9%	
Labour	John G. Bartlett	8,452	37.1%	
Liberal	John S. Winter	3,357	14.7%	
Constitutional Movement	Leslie Edward David Le Croissette	296	1.3%	
Majority		2226	9.8%	
Turnout		22783		
Conservative hold		Swing		

Harrow West
Party	Candidate	Votes	%	±%
Conservative	Sir Horace Walter Cutler*	14,524	55.3%	
Labour	Kerry Underwood	6,542	24.4%	
Liberal	Ronald Fraser Dick	4,943	18.8%	
Constitutional Movement	Bernard W. Robinson	271	1.0%	n/a
Majority		7982	30.4%	
Turnout		26280		
Conservative hold		Swing		

=== Havering ===
Hornchurch
Party	Candidate	Votes	%	±%
Labour	Alan Ronald Williams	13,734	47.7%	
Conservative	Robert James MacGillivray Neill	10,845	37.6%	
Liberal	Adrienne L. McCarthy	4,226	14.7%	
Majority		2889	10.1%	
Turnout		28805		
Labour gain from Conservative		Swing		

Romford
Party	Candidate	Votes	%	±%
Conservative	Bernard Brook-Partridge	12,041	48.6%	
Labour	Jack Hoepelman	9,029	36.5%	
Liberal	Pauline A. Longhorn	3,123	12.6%	
National Front	Madeline Pauline V. Caine	562	2.3%	
Majority		3012	12.1%	
Turnout		24755		
Conservative hold		Swing		

Upminster
Party	Candidate	Votes	%	±%
Conservative	Anthony William Bays	14,549	45.7%	
Labour	Graham W. Allen	12,391	39.0%	
Liberal	David J. Ingle	4,213	13.2%	
National Front	William J. Neary	655	2.1%	
Majority		2158	6.7%	
Turnout		31808		
Conservative hold		Swing		

=== Hillingdon ===
Hayes & Harlington
Party	Candidate	Votes	%	±%
Labour	John Martin McDonnell	12,871	50.8%	
Conservative	Arthur Horace Sydney Hull*	8,525	33.7%	
Liberal	Alan H. Rowland	3,628	10.4%	
Communist	John C. Mansfield	299	1.2%	
Majority		4346	17.1%	
Turnout		25323		
Labour gain from Conservative		Swing		

Ruislip-Northwood
Party	Candidate	Votes	%	±%
Conservative	Cyril Julian Hebden Taylor*	17,147	61.0%	
Labour	Keith Goldsworthy	5,791	20.6%	
Liberal	George Raymond Stephenson	4,958	17.6%	
Constitutional Movement	George W. Bryant	196	0.7%	n/a
Majority		11356	40.4%	
Turnout		28092		
Conservative hold		Swing		

Uxbridge
Party	Candidate	Votes	%	±%
Conservative	James Anthony Lemkin*	15,413	49.7%	
Labour	Patrick J. Magee	11,791	38.0%	
Liberal	Brian Outhwaite	3,675	11.8%	
Constitutional Movement	Jane O. Stubbs	148	0.5%	
Majority		3622	11.7%	
Turnout		31027		
Conservative hold		Swing		

=== Hounslow ===
Brentford & Isleworth
Party	Candidate	Votes	%	±%
Conservative	George Nicholas Alexander Bailey	17,695	48.3%	
Labour	Roy G Gregory	15,091	41.2%	
Liberal	Joan B Langrognat	3,342	9.1%	
Save London Action Group	Paul A Hughes-Smith	233	0.6%	
Full Employment & Anti-Common Market	Reginald E G Simmerson	201	0.5%	
Constitutional Movement	Gareth D Pearce	104	0.3%	
Majority		2604	7.1%	
Turnout		36666		
Conservative hold		Swing		

Feltham & Heston
Party	Candidate	Votes	%	±%
Labour	Peter Samuel Pitt	18,788	53.7%	
Conservative	Ronald Dennis Mitchell*	12,565	35.9%	
Liberal	Mrs Ann M Alagappa	3,629	10.4%	
Majority		6223	17.8%	
Turnout		34982		
Labour gain from Conservative		Swing		

=== Islington ===
Islington Central
Party	Candidate	Votes	%	±%
Labour	Simon John Turney*	9,675	61.3%	
Conservative	Peter R Crockford	3,788	24.0%	
Liberal	Margot Joan Dunn	1,744	11.0%	
NNF	John R Smith	333	2.1%	
Workers Revolutionary	Mrs Sylvia Lincoln	133	0.8%	
Constitutional Movement	Philip Holden	118	0.7%	
Majority		5887	37.3%	
Turnout		15791		
Labour hold		Swing		

Islington North
Party	Candidate	Votes	%	±%
Labour	Stephen Bundred	10,401	59.7%	
Conservative	Kenneth E J Graham	3,564	20.4%	
Social Democratic Alliance	Patrick Sheeran	2,505	14.4%	
Liberal	Christopher T Johnson	812	4.7%	
Constitutional Movement	Shaun P Bowdidge	152	0.9%	
Majority		6837	39.3%	
Turnout		17434		
Labour hold		Swing		

Islington South & Finsbury
Party	Candidate	Votes	%	±%
Labour	Frances M Morrell	7,296	50.8%	
Conservative	John D E Gallagher	3,014	20.7%	
Social Democratic Alliance	Douglas Eden	2,707	18.6%	
Liberal	John P Hudson	696	4.8%	
National Front	John B Donegan	447	3.1%	
Constitutional Movement	Francis T Theobald	109	0.8%	
Socialist (GB)	Barry K McNeeney	83	0.6%	
Majority		4282	30.1%	
Turnout		14352		
Labour hold		Swing		

=== Kensington and Chelsea ===
Chelsea
Party	Candidate	Votes	%	±%
Conservative	William Archibald Ottley Juxon Bell*	12,131	63.7%	
Labour	Stephen Benn	3,810	20.0%	
Liberal	Jennifer Margaret Ware	2,793	14.7%	
Save London Action Group	Mrs Mary P W Colmore	316	1.7%	n/a
Majority		8321	43.7%	
Turnout		19050		
Conservative hold		Swing		

Kensington
Party	Candidate	Votes	%	±%
Conservative	Robert Louis Vigars*	9,579	47.3%	
Labour	Stephen Peter Hoier	7,317	36.2%	
Liberal	Ernest Richard Tudway	1,907	9.4%	
Social Democratic Alliance	Len Green	650	3.2%	n/a
Ecology	Roger E Shorter	427	2.1%	n/a
Communist	Edward S Adams	161	0.8%	
Workers Revolutionary	Lesley E Gould	101	0.5%	n/a
Save London Action Group	Maureen V M Cornwall	97	0.5%	n/a
Majority		2262	11.2%	
Turnout		20239		
Conservative hold		Swing		

=== Kingston upon Thames ===
Kingston upon Thames
Party	Candidate	Votes	%	±%
Conservative	Sydney William Leonard Ripley*	11,551	48.0%	
Labour	Stuart Henry James Hercock	5,739	23.8%	
Liberal	Stephen J Harris	4,894	20.3%	
Social Democratic Alliance	Anthony M Ward	1,544	6.4%	
Ecology	Mike Elam	355	1.5%	
Majority		5812	24.1%	
Turnout		24083		
Conservative hold		Swing		

Surbiton
Party	Candidate	Votes	%	±%
Conservative	Geoffrey John David Seaton*	9,998	50.5%	
Labour	Andrew Stuart MacKinlay	6,056	30.6%	
Liberal	Patrick Thurlbeck Humphrey	3,246	16.4%	
Ecology	Jim MacLellan	432	2.2%	n/a
Independent	Pauline E L M Russell	82	0.4%	n/a
Majority		3942	19.9%	
Turnout		19814		
Conservative hold		Swing		

Russell: Abolitionist

=== Lambeth ===
Lambeth Central
Party	Candidate	Votes	%	±%
Labour	Paul David Moore	8,349	51.1%	
Conservative	Douglas S Mills	4,788	29.3%	
Social Democratic Alliance	Roger G Fox	1,737	10.6%	
Liberal	Christopher Josef Sadowski	865	5.3%	
National Front	Roger L Denny	321	2.0%	
Communist	Mrs Jean E Styles	178	1.1%	
Revolutionary Communist	Kevin Green	116	0.7%	
Majority		3561	21.8%	
Turnout		16354		
Labour hold		Swing		

Norwood
Party	Candidate	Votes	%	±%
Conservative	Prof. Norman John David Smith*	10,700	43.2%	
Labour	Edward Robert Knight	8,107	32.7%	
Social Democratic Alliance	Stephen Michael Alan Haseler	3,709	15.0%	
Liberal	Fraser K. Murrey	1,443	5.8%	
National Front	Catherine M. Williams	423	1.7%	
Ratepayers Watchdog	Bernard Webb	317	1.1%	
Fair Rates, Anti-Corruption	Sidney A. Chaney	73	0.3%	
Majority		2593	10.5%	
Turnout		24772		
Conservative hold		Swing		

Streatham
Party	Candidate	Votes	%	±%
Conservative	Frederick Walter Weyer*	13,340	53.6%	
Labour	Michael F Drake	7,259	29.2%	
Liberal	Christine L Headley	3,732	15.0%	
National Front	John G Wright	344	1.4%	
Save London Alliance	Martin C Gowar	126	0.5%	
Public Safety Democratic Monarchist White Resident	William George Boaks	82	0.3%	
Majority		6081	24.4%	
Turnout		24883		
Conservative hold		Swing		

Vauxhall
Party	Candidate	Votes	%	±%
Labour	Brinley Howard Davies*	7,383	48.7%	
Conservative	Richard M S O'Sullivan	4,177	27.6%	
Social Democratic Alliance	Rev. David M Mason	2,262	14.9%	
Liberal	John W Parton	830	5.5%	
National Front	Vernon C Atkinson	508	3.4%	
Majority		3206	21.1%	
Turnout		15160		
Labour hold		Swing		

=== Lewisham ===
Deptford
Party	Candidate	Votes	%	±%
Labour	Alexander Charles Mackay	11,698	47.6%	
Liberal	Miss Hilary J Kramer	7,479	30.4%	
Conservative	William A A Wells	4,438	18.0%	
NNF	Richard C Edmonds	487	2.0%	
Ecology	Mrs Elaine A Gibson	406	1.7%	
Constitutional Movement	Trevor M Smith	91	0.4%	
Majority		4219	17.2%	
Turnout		24599		
Labour hold		Swing		

Lewisham East
Party	Candidate	Votes	%	±%
Labour	Paul Nigel Rossi	15,887	51.2%	
Conservative	Jonathan Sayeed	10,758	34.6%	
Liberal	John R Hassall	3,005	9.7%	
NNF	Stephen P Greene	719	2.3%	
Abolition of Rates	Fannie E Saffery	272	0.9%	
Communist	Michael Power	267	0.9%	
Workers Revolutionary	Donovan H St E Chapman	143	0.5%	
Majority		5129	16.6%	
Turnout		31051		
Labour hold		Swing		

Lewisham West
Party	Candidate	Votes	%	±%
Labour	Alan Lewis Herbert*	12,984	48.3%	
Conservative	Robin F Pitt	10,709	39.8%	
Liberal	Gwilym J Savill	2,333	8.7%	
NNF	Ramon F Hoy	511	1.9%	
Ecology	Susan M Kennedy	242	0.9%	
Constitutional Movement	Susan C McKenzie	100	0.4%	
Majority		2275	8.5%	
Turnout		26879		
Labour hold		Swing		

=== Merton ===
Mitcham & Morden
Party	Candidate	Votes	%	±%
Labour	Anthony Robert Judge	13,299	46.5%	
Conservative	Brian Joseph Shenton*	10,588	37.0%	
Liberal	Ronald Arthur Locke	3,681	12.9%	
National Front	John R Perryman	693	2.4%	
Ecology	Roger C Stanley	330	1.2%	
Majority		2711	9.5%	
Turnout		28591		
Labour gain from Conservative		Swing		

Wimbledon
Party	Candidate	Votes	%	±%
Conservative	Stanley Charles Bolton*	16,548	52.7%	
Labour	Rock Benedict Tansey	9,645	30.7%	
Liberal	Andrew C Trompeteler	3,889	12.4%	
Ecology	Antony Jones	781	2.5%	
National Front	Mark T Spong	376	1.2%	
Teacher	Frank Barnett	162	0.5%	
Majority		6903	22.0%	
Turnout		31401		
Conservative hold		Swing		

=== Newham ===
Newham North East
Party	Candidate	Votes	%	±%
Labour	John Wilson*	14,231	61.6	+12.0
Conservative	Christopher D. Sills	4,563	19.8	−17.9
Liberal	David John Corney	2,608	11.3	n/a
National Front	Robert S.F. Young	850	3.7	−9.0
East London Workers Against Racism	Farehk Afzal	469	2.0	n/a
Workers Revolutionary	Keith R. Scotcher	198	0.9	n/a
Constitutional Movement	Timothy S. Bennett	173	0.7	n/a
Majority		9,668	41.8	+29.9
Turnout			35.8	
Labour hold		Swing	+14.9	

Newham North West
Party	Candidate	Votes	%	±%
Labour	Arthur Frank George Edwards*	11,724	69.6	+16.0
Conservative	David R. Bick	2,530	15.0	−17.6
Liberal	Christopher M. Hill	1,845	10.9	+6.8
National Front	William J. Roberts	753	4.5	−5.20
Majority		9,194	54.6	+33.6
Turnout			33.0	
Labour hold		Swing	+16.8	

Newham South
Party	Candidate	Votes	%	±%
Labour	Thomas Alfred Jenkinson*	11,238	70.6	+15.9
Conservative	Robert F. Williams	1,899	11.9	−12.5
Liberal	William P. Galinis	1,780	11.2	+7.8
National Front	Michael B. Hipperson	1,006	6.3	n/a
Majority		9,339	58.7	+28.4
Turnout			30.7	
Labour hold		Swing	+14.2	

=== Redbridge ===
Ilford North
Party	Candidate	Votes	%	±%
Conservative	Marion Audrey Roe*	15,022	48.6%	
Labour	Michael M A Killingworth	11,857	38.3%	
Liberal	Gary P Straight	3,236	10.5%	
National Front	Harold Marshall	387	1.3%	
Ecology	Neil Jeffries	330	1.1%	
NNF	Keith Sims	92	0.3%	
Majority		3165	10.3%	
Turnout		30924		
Conservative hold		Swing		

Ilford South
Party	Candidate	Votes	%	±%
Labour	Edward Stephen Gouge	11,561	45.8%	
Conservative	Arnold Kinzley*	10,115	40.1%	
Liberal	Ralph John Scott	2,988	11.8%	
NNF	Peter J Clark	342	1.4%	
Ecology	David Matanle	247	1.0%	
Majority		1446	5.7%	
Turnout		25253		
Labour gain from Conservative		Swing		

Wanstead & Woodford
Party	Candidate	Votes	%	±%
Conservative	Robert Mitchell*	13,355	55.7%	
Labour	Paul R Fiander	4,770	19.9%	
Liberal	Alan Frank Cornish	4,616	19.3%	
Ecology	Mrs Cynthia Warth	625	2.6%	
National Front	Denis G Holland	354	1.5%	
Communist	Anthony J Briscoe	186	0.8%	
NNF	Robert A Martin	87	0.4%	
Majority		8585	35.8%	
Turnout		23993		
Conservative hold		Swing		

=== Richmond upon Thames ===
Richmond
Party	Candidate	Votes	%	±%
Liberal	Adrian Carnegie Slade	14,168	45.6%	
Conservative	Edward Julian Egerton Leigh*	14,053	45.2%	
Labour	Elizabeth Nash	2,431	7.8%	
Ecology	Barnaby Martin	300	1.0%	
Save London Action Group	Ms Gwendoline M Marsh	112	0.4%	
Majority		115	0.4%	
Turnout		31064		
Liberal gain from Conservative		Swing		

Twickenham
Party	Candidate	Votes	%	±%
Conservative	George William Tremlett*	17,513	45.2%	
Liberal	John P M Rowlands	15,906	41.0%	
Labour	Brian A Kemp	4,856	12.5%	
Ecology	Peter Furtado	486	1.3%	
Majority		1607	4.2%	
Turnout		38761		
Conservative hold		Swing		

=== Southwark ===
Bermondsey
Party	Candidate	Votes	%	±%
Labour	George Edward Nicholson	12,000	66.0%	
Liberal	Simon Henry Ward Hughes	2,914	16.0%	
Conservative	Nicholas Paul Mearing-Smith	2,444	13.4%	
National Front	James Stephen Sneath	830	4.6%	
Majority		9086	50.0%	
Turnout		18188		
Labour hold		Swing		

Dulwich
Party	Candidate	Votes	%	±%
Labour	Lesley Hammon	13,039	46.7%	
Conservative	Gerald Francis Bowden*	10,041	35.9%	
Liberal	Jonathan Nigel Hunt	3,526	12.6%	
National Front	Patrick McConnell	684	2.4%	
Ecology	David A Smart	525	1.9%	
Abolish the GLC	William E S Newton	110	0.4%	
Majority		2998	10.8%	
Turnout		27925		
Labour gain from Conservative		Swing		

Peckham
Party	Candidate	Votes	%	±%
Labour	Harvey William Hinds*	12,461	68.3%	
Conservative	John Alan Redwood	2,702	14.8%	
Liberal	Gillian Isabel Clemens	1,669	9.2%	
National Front	Wayne L Martin	971	5.3%	
Communist	Eric L Hodson	313	1.7%	
Abolish the GLC	Brian W Dames	116	0.6%	
Majority		9759	53.5%	
Turnout		18232		
Labour hold		Swing		

=== Sutton ===
Carshalton
Party	Candidate	Votes	%	±%
Conservative	Sonia Copland*	14,070	43.1%	
Labour	John A S Weir	10,548	32.3%	
Liberal	Thomas Edward Dutton	7,059	21.6%	
National Front	Denis V Horton	513	1.6%	
Ecology	Robert W Steel	490	1.5%	
Majority		3522	10.8%	
Turnout		32680		
Conservative hold		Swing		

Sutton & Cheam
Party	Candidate	Votes	%	±%
Conservative	Muriel Gumbel	15,666	45.8%	
Liberal	Elizabeth M Sharp	14,664	42.9%	
Labour	Philip J Bassett	3,555	10.4%	
Ecology	Jonathan P Vickery	312	0.9%	
Majority		1002	2.9%	
Turnout		34197		
Conservative hold		Swing		

=== Tower Hamlets ===
Bethnal Green & Bow
Party	Candidate	Votes	%	±%
Labour	Sir Ernest Ashley Bramall*	9,162	47.2%	
Liberal	Brian Williams	7,591	39.1%	
Conservative	Christopher William Nolan	1,230	6.3%	
National Front	Victor J Clark	755	3.9%	
NFCM	Alan J Wilkens	257	1.3%	
East London Workers Against Racism	Fran Eden	211	1.1%	
Workers Revolutionary	Angela Mitchell	185	1.0%	
Majority		1571	8.1%	
Turnout		19391		
Labour hold		Swing		

Stepney & Poplar
Party	Candidate	Votes	%	±%
Labour	John Patrick Branagan*	14,538	76.3%	
Conservative	Mrs Elizabeth N Spencer	2,458	12.9%	
National Front	Peter W Poinery-Rudd	618	3.2%	
Communist	Max Samuel Levitas	487	2.6%	
Enoch Powell is Right	Ms Jean R White	487	2.6%	
Ecology	David J Fitzpatrick	475	2.5%	
Majority		12080	63.4%	
Turnout		19063		
		Swing		

=== Waltham Forest ===
Chingford
Party	Candidate	Votes	%	±%
Conservative	Richard Maddock Brew*	13,501	52.5%	
Labour	Benjamin B Birnbaum	7,057	27.4%	
Liberal	Miss Lucille D Wells	3,634	14.1%	
Ecology	John E Morgan	847	3.3%	
National Front	Mrs Irene McDuff	694	2.7%	
Majority		6444	25.1%	
Turnout		25733		
Conservative hold		Swing		

Leyton
Party	Candidate	Votes	%	±%
Labour	Peter John Dawe	12,953	56.3%	
Conservative	Waldemar Thor Neilson-Hansen*	6,008	26.1%	
Liberal	Robert F Sullivan	3,071	13.3%	
National Front	Colin R Coward	734	3.2%	
Communist	John Arthur Courcouf	242	1.1%	
Majority		6945	30.2%	
Turnout		23008		
Labour gain from Conservative		Swing		

Walthamstow
Party	Candidate	Votes	%	±%
Labour	Paul Yaw Boateng	9,749	46.3%	
Conservative	Mark A L Batchelor	5,293	25.1%	
Social Democratic Alliance	Peter L Leighton	3,068	14.6%	
Liberal	Robert J Wheatley	1,572	7.5%	
National Front	George J F Flaxton	824	3.9%	
Ecology	Jean Denise Lambert	544	2.6%	
Majority		4456	21.2%	
Turnout		21050		
Labour hold		Swing		

=== Wandsworth ===
Battersea North
Party	Candidate	Votes	%	±%
Labour	Gladys Felicia Dimson*	11,143	62.6%	
Conservative	Mrs Margaret Riddell	4,760	26.8%	
Liberal	James G Caple	981	5.5%	
National Front	Michael J Salt	493	2.8%	
Ecology	Paul W Ekins	299	1.7%	
Workers Revolutionary	Sandra Baker	70	0.4%	
Save London Action Group	Ralston L Winn	43	0.2%	
Majority		6383	35.8%	
Turnout		17789		
Labour hold		Swing		

Battersea South
Party	Candidate	Votes	%	±%
Labour	Valerie Wise	9,525	44.3%	
Conservative	Mrs Margaret Williams*	8,956	41.7%	
Liberal	Charles S Welchman	2,359	10.8%	
Ecology	Bruce MacKenzie	337	1.6%	
National Front	Anthony W Perry	275	1.3%	
Save London Action Group	Ms Catherine D Kennington	35	0.2%	
Majority		569	2.6%	
Turnout		21487		
Labour gain from Conservative		Swing		

Putney
Party	Candidate	Votes	%	±%
Labour	Andrew Phillip Harris	14,488	42.3%	
Conservative	Jeffrey Gordon	13,741	40.1%	
Liberal	Colin Gordon Darracott	3,813	11.1%	
Social Democratic Alliance	Michael J Burton	1,555	4.5%	
National Front	Ms Shirley Attree	393	1.1%	
Ecology	Ms Geraldine A Goller	240	0.7%	
Save London Action Group	Mrs Mary M Giles	53	0.2%	
Majority		747	2.2%	
Turnout		34283		
Labour hold		Swing		

Tooting
Party	Candidate	Votes	%	±%
Labour	Anthony Louis Banks	12,127	53.1%	
Conservative	Thomas Alfred Leefe Ham*	7,268	31.8%	
Liberal	Ian D Mason	2,278	10.0%	
National Front	Peter Berbridge	443	1.9%	
Ecology	Donald J Valentine	314	1.4%	
Communist	Robert E Lewis	281	1.2%	
Workers Revolutionary	Adrian L Greeman	145	0.6%	
Majority		4859	21.3%	
Turnout		22856		
Labour gain from Conservative		Swing		

=== Westminster and the City of London ===
City of London & Westminster South
Party	Candidate	Votes	%	±%
Conservative	David James Avery	9,660	58.3%	
Labour	Reg M Fryer	4,628	27.9%	
Liberal	Adrian A Walker-Smith	1,807	10.9%	
Communist	Jeremy J Clark	215	1.3%	
Save London Action Group	Alison A Furness	178	1.1%	
Workers Revolutionary	David W Gilbert	87	0.5%	
Majority		5032	30.4%	
Turnout		16575		
		Swing		

Paddington
Party	Candidate	Votes	%	±%
Labour	Kenneth Robert Livingstone*	11,864	50.2%	
Conservative	Patricia Mary Kirwan*	8,467	35.8%	
Social Democratic Alliance	James Spillius	1,845	7.8%	
Liberal	Alastair John Brett	1,135	4.8%	
National Front	William T. Acton	237	1.0%	
Save London Action Group	David P. Green	109	0.5%	
Majority		3397	14.4%	
Turnout		23657		
Labour gain from Conservative		Swing		

St Marylebone
Party	Candidate	Votes	%	±%
Conservative	Herbert Henry Sandford*	8,183	56.6%	
Labour Co-op	Jean Merriton	4,573	31.6%	
Liberal	Penelope E. Baker	1,305	9.0%	
Ecology	Audrey B. Hickey	408	2.8%	
Majority		3610	25.0%	
Turnout		14469		
Conservative hold		Swing		

== By-elections 1981-1986 ==
The following by-elections took place between May 1981 and May 1986.

St. Pancras North, October 1981
Party	Candidate	Votes	%	±%
SDP	Anne Hallowell Sofer*	6,919	43.6	+34.6
Labour	Mildred Gordon	6,181	39.0	−20.2
Conservative	Ian Pasley-Tyler	2,684	16.9	−14.1
Abolish the GLC	John J de R West	82	0.5	n/a
Majority		738	4.6	54.8
Turnout		15,866	38.6	
SDP gain from Labour		Swing	+27.4	

Tottenham, May 1983
Party	Candidate	Votes	%	±%
Labour	Jennifer Fletcher	8,984	52.4%	−12.3%
Conservative	Peter L Murphy	5,835	34.0%	+11.2%
Liberal	Alexander S C L'Estrange	2,089	12.2%	+2.6%
National Front	John B Donegan	244	1.4%	N/A
Majority		3149	18.4%	−23.5%
Turnout		17152	40.1	
Labour hold		Swing		

Surbiton, September 1983
Party	Candidate	Votes	%	±%
Conservative	Anthony Francis Arbour	5,458	46.4%	−4.1%
SDP	Christopher Nowakowski	3,870	32.9%	N/A
Labour	Allister H McGowan	2,184	18.6%	−12.0%
Ecology	Jim Maclellan	202	1.7%	−0.5%
Communist	Jean S F Turner	58	0.5%	N/A
Majority		1588	13.5%	−4.4%
Turnout		11772	25.0	
Conservative hold		Swing		

Edmonton, September 1984
Party	Candidate	Votes	%	±%
Labour	Kenneth W Little*	9,340	75.3%	+19.7%
SDP	Alan J Wall	2,007	16.2%	−15.2%
Ind. Conservative	Kevin Miller	802	6.5%	N/A
National Front	Brent A Cheetham	167	1.2%	N/A
Ecology	Stephen Rooney	85	0.7%	N/A
Majority		7333	59.1%	+34.9%
Turnout		12401	20.4	
Labour hold		Swing		

Hayes & Harlington, September 1984
Party	Candidate	Votes	%	±%
Labour	John Martin McDonnell*	11,279	68.9	+18.1
SDP	Peter F N Russell	4,870	29.7	+15.4
National Front	Mark T Spong	227	1.4	n/a
Majority		6,409	39.2	
Turnout		16,376	28.3	
Labour hold		Swing	+1.3	

Lewisham West, September 1984
Party	Candidate	Votes	%	±%
Labour	Alan Lewis Herbert	10,432	66.3	
Liberal	Julian M Davies	4,715	29.9	
Pro-Abolition Alliance	Michael Moore	330	2.1	n/a
National Front	John G Wright	266	1.7	
Majority		5,717	36.3	
Turnout		15,743	26.3	
Labour hold		Swing		

Paddington, September 1984
Party	Candidate	Votes	%	±%
Labour	Kenneth Robert Livingstone*	12,414		
Liberal	Stephen J Harris	2,729		
Conservative, Anti-Common Market	Reginald E G Simmerson	287		
Abolish the GLC	Stephen W D Banks	226		
National Front	Roger L Denny	123		
Reform schools	George A Clerick	55		
Gaitskellite Labour	Peter J. Nealton	45		
Majority				
Turnout			29.9	
Labour hold		Swing		

Battersea North, June 1985
Party	Candidate	Votes	%	±%
Labour	John Vincent Norman Lucas	7,321		
Liberal	Stephen J Pearson	1,877		
Ecology	Sonia G Willington			
Majority				
Turnout			23.5	
Labour hold		Swing		

Putney, June 1985
Party	Candidate	Votes	%	±%
Labour	Margaret Anne Jenkins	8,680		
SDP	Jeremy N Ambache	4,900		
Ecology	Christopher Cantwell	392		
Pro-Abolition Alliance	Mark W Hatherell	171		
Majority				
Turnout			22.5	
Labour hold		Swing		

Romford, July 1985
Party	Candidate	Votes	%	±%
Conservative	Robert James MacGillivray Neill	7,122		
Labour	Gillian C. Hannah-Rogers	4,793		
Liberal	Pauline A. Longhorn	4,332		
Ecology	Diane R. Burgess	431		
Majority				
Turnout			29.5	
Conservative hold		Swing		

Vauxhall, July 1985
Party	Candidate	Votes	%	±%
Liberal	Michael William Tuffrey	4,600	48.7	+28.6
Labour	Lorna M Boreland	4,212	20.4	−3.8
National Front	John G Wright	253	2.7	−0.6
Pro-Abolition Alliance	Simon H Fawthorp	113	1.2	n/a
Communist	David J S Cook	110	1.2	n/a
Revolutionary Communist	Jean Smith	93	1.0	n/a
Majority				32.4
Turnout		9,381	24.7	
Liberal gain from Labour		Swing	+16.2	
