= Leigham (ward) =

- Former electoral ward for the Lambeth London Borough Council
- Borough: Lambeth
- County: Greater London

Former electoral ward
- Created: 1965
- Abolished: 1978
- Councillors: 3

Leigham was an electoral ward in the London Borough of Lambeth from 1965 to 1978. The ward was first used in the 1964 elections and last used for the 1974 elections. It returned three councillors to Lambeth London Borough Council. For elections to the Greater London Council, the ward was part of the Lambeth electoral division from 1965 and then the Norwood division from 1973.

== Lambeth council elections ==
=== 1974 election ===
The election took place on 2 May 1974.

=== 1971 election ===
The election took place on 13 May 1971.

1971 Lambeth London Borough Council election: Leigham
Party	Candidate	Votes	%
Labour	M. V. Bedford	2,533	16.9%
Labour	B. C. Porter	2,503	16.7%
Labour	S. L. H. Shah	2,388	15.9%
Conservative	K. Scott-Simpson	2,377	15.8%
Conservative	B. J. Perkins	2,376	15.8%
Conservative	B. A. Udell	2,355	15.7%
Liberal	G. A. Chattoe	178	1.2%
Liberal	D. P. Mann	160	1.1%
Liberal	M. L. Baker-Caton	154	1.0%
Turnout		15,024	
Labour gain from Conservative			
Labour gain from Conservative			
Labour gain from Conservative			

=== 1968 election ===
The election took place on 9 May 1968.

=== 1964 election ===
The election took place on 7 May 1964.

1964 Lambeth London Borough Council election: Leigham
Party	Candidate	Votes	%	±%
Conservative	K. Scott-Simpson	1,883	49.4	
Conservative	W. C. Dennis	1,874		
Conservative	B. J. Perkins	1,835		
Labour	G. D. Manning	1,456	38.2	
Labour	J. Williams	1,425		
Labour	G. F. May	1,422		
Liberal	D. J. Leedham	469	12.3	
Liberal	R. J. Rust	468		
Liberal	F. R. Mott	454		
Turnout		3,794	32.4	
Registered electors		11,719		
Conservative win (new seat)				
Conservative win (new seat)				
Conservative win (new seat)				
