= Holborn and St Pancras South =

Holborn and St Pancras South could refer to:

- Holborn and St Pancras South (UK Parliament constituency)
- Holborn and St Pancras South (electoral division), Greater London Council
- Holborn and St Pancras South (London County Council constituency)
