= Streatham (disambiguation) =

Streatham is a district in south London, England.

Streatham may also refer to:

- Streatham (electoral division), a constituency of the Greater London Council
- Streatham (London County Council constituency)
- Streatham (UK Parliament constituency)
- Streatham, Victoria, a town in Victoria, Australia
- Streatham (1805 EIC ship), an East Indiaman
- "Streatham", a song by Dave from the 2019 album Psychodrama

== See also ==
- Stretham, a village in Cambridgeshire, England
- Streatham Campus, a site of the University of Exeter, Devon, England
