= Lambeth Central (electoral division) =

Electoral division in Greater London, 1973–1986

- Former electoral division for the Greater London Council
- Lambeth Central electoral division boundaries
- District: Lambeth
- Electorate: 47,968 (1973); 46,761 (1977); 41,415 (1981)
- Major settlements: Clapham
- Area: 533 hectares (5.33 km^{2})

Former electoral division
- Created: 1973
- Abolished: 1986
- Member: 1
- Created from: Lambeth

Lambeth Central was an electoral division for the purposes of elections to the Greater London Council. The constituency elected one councillor for a four-year term in 1973, 1977 and 1981, with the final term extended for an extra year ahead of the abolition of the Greater London Council.

== History ==
It was planned to use the same boundaries as the Westminster Parliament constituencies for election of councillors to the Greater London Council (GLC), as had been the practice for elections to the predecessor London County Council, but those that existed in 1965 crossed the Greater London boundary. Until new constituencies could be settled, the 32 London boroughs were used as electoral areas. The London Borough of Lambeth formed the Lambeth electoral division. This was used for the Greater London Council elections in 1964, 1967 and 1970.

The new constituencies were settled following the Second Periodic Review of Westminster constituencies and the new electoral division matched the boundaries of the Lambeth Central parliamentary constituency.

The area was in a long-term period of population decline that was yet to reverse. The electorate reduced from 47,968 in 1973 to 41,415 in 1981. It covered an area of 533 hectares (5.33 km^{2}).

== Elections ==
The Lambeth Central constituency was used for the Greater London Council elections in 1973, 1977 and 1981. One councillor was elected at each election using first-past-the-post voting.

=== 1973 election ===
The fourth election to the GLC (and first using revised boundaries) was held on 12 April 1973. The electorate was 47,968 and one Labour Party councillor was elected. The turnout was 27.8%. The councillor was elected for a three-year term. This was extended for an extra year in 1976 when the electoral cycle was switched to four-yearly.

1973 Greater London Council election: Lambeth Central
Party	Candidate	Votes	%	±%
Labour	Anna Lloyd Grieves	9,231	69.48	
Conservative	John L. Pritchard	2,707	20.18	
Liberal	J. T. Kane	1,026	7.65	
Anti-Motorway, Support Community Involvement in Planning	C. G. Jackson	143	1.07	
Socialist (GB)	H. G. Baldwin	115	0.86	
Lambeth Residents for Democratic Local Government	G. W. Solomon	103	0.77	
Turnout				
Labour win (new seat)				

=== 1977 election ===
The fifth election to the GLC (and second using revised boundaries) was held on 5 May 1977. The electorate was 46,761 and one Labour Party councillor was elected. The turnout was 31.4%. The councillor was elected for a four-year term.

1977 Greater London Council election: Lambeth Central
Party	Candidate	Votes	%	±%
Labour	Anna Lloyd Grieves	7,155	48.91	
Conservative	Raymond G. Hatter	5,485	37.51	
National Front	Kathleen Mott	760	5.20	
Liberal	William A. J. Bennett	652	4.46	
International Marxist	Piers Richard Corbyn	219	1.50	
Communist	S. G. Hope	204	1.39	
Socialist (GB)	H. G. Baldwin	101	0.69	
Independent	William George Boaks	51	0.35	
Turnout				
Labour hold		Swing		

=== 1981 election ===
The sixth and final election to the GLC (and third using revised boundaries) was held on 7 May 1981. The electorate was 41,415 and one Labour Party councillor was elected. The turnout was 39.7%. The councillor was elected for a four-year term, extended by an extra year by the Local Government (Interim Provisions) Act 1984, ahead of the abolition of the council.

1981 Greater London Council election: Lambeth Central
Party	Candidate	Votes	%	±%
Labour	Paul D. Moore	8,349	51.05	
Conservative	D. S. Mills	4,788	29.28	
Social Democratic Alliance	Roger G. Fox	1,737	10.62	
Liberal	C. J. Sadowski	865	5.29	
National Front	R. L. Denny	321	1.96	
Communist	J. E. Styles	178	1.09	
Revolutionary Communist	K. Green	116	0.71	
Turnout				
Labour hold		Swing		
