= Wimbledon (electoral division) =

Electoral division in Greater London, 1973–1986

- Former electoral division for the Greater London Council
- District: Merton
- Electorate: 70,902 (1973); 68,395 (1977); 64,759 (1981)
- Area: 2,073 hectares (20.73 km^{2})

Former electoral division
- Created: 1973
- Abolished: 1986
- Member: 1
- Created from: Merton

Wimbledon was an electoral division for the purposes of elections to the Greater London Council. The constituency elected one councillor for a four-year term in 1973, 1977 and 1981, with the final term extended for an extra year ahead of the abolition of the Greater London Council.

== History ==
It was planned to use the same boundaries as the Westminster Parliament constituencies for election of councillors to the Greater London Council (GLC), as had been the practice for elections to the predecessor London County Council, but those that existed in 1965 crossed the Greater London boundary. Until new constituencies could be settled, the 32 London boroughs were used as electoral areas. The London Borough of Merton formed the Merton electoral division. This was used for the Greater London Council elections in 1964, 1967 and 1970.

The new constituencies were settled following the Second Periodic Review of Westminster constituencies and the new electoral division matched the boundaries of the Wimbledon parliamentary constituency.

It covered an area of 2,073 hectares (20.73 km^{2}).

== Elections ==
The Wimbledon constituency was used for the Greater London Council elections in 1973, 1977 and 1981. One councillor was elected at each election using first-past-the-post voting.

=== 1973 election ===
The fourth election to the GLC (and first using revised boundaries) was held on 12 April 1973. The electorate was 70,902 and one Conservative Party councillor was elected. The turnout was 40.7%. The councillor was elected for a three-year term. This was extended for an extra year in 1976 when the electoral cycle was switched to four-yearly.

1973 Greater London Council election: Wimbledon
Party	Candidate	Votes	%	±%
Conservative	Stanley Charles Bolton	14,056	48.69	
Labour	K. Bill	8,389	29.07	
Liberal	P. C. Spratling	6,419	22.24	
Turnout				
Conservative win (new seat)				

=== 1977 election ===
The fifth election to the GLC (and second using revised boundaries) was held on 5 May 1977. The electorate was 68,395 and one Conservative Party councillor was elected. The turnout was 47.6%. The councillor was elected for a four-year term.

1977 Greater London Council election: Wimbledon
Party	Candidate	Votes	%	±%
Conservative	Stanley Charles Bolton	20,891	64.22	
Labour	Rock B. Tansey	7,610	23.39	
Liberal	R. A. Locke	2,794	8.59	
National Front	G. Renelt	783	2.41	
GLC Abolitionist Campaign	J. H. Brewer	301	0.93	
Independent	C. J. Ward	152	0.47	
Turnout				
Conservative hold		Swing		

=== 1981 election ===
The sixth and final election to the GLC (and third using revised boundaries) was held on 7 May 1981. The electorate was 64,759 and one Conservative Party councillor was elected. The turnout was 48.5%. The councillor was elected for a four-year term, extended by an extra year by the Local Government (Interim Provisions) Act 1984, ahead of the abolition of the council.

1981 Greater London Council election: Wimbledon
Party	Candidate	Votes	%	±%
Conservative	Stanley Charles Bolton	16,548	52.70	
Labour	Rock B. Tansey	9,645	30.72	
Liberal	Andrew C. Trompeteler	3,889	12.38	
Ecology	Anthony Jones	781	2.49	
National Front	Mark T. Spong	376	1.20	
Independent	Frank Barnett	162	0.52	
Turnout				
Conservative hold		Swing		
