= Hounslow (electoral division) =

Electoral division in Greater London, 1965–1973

- Former electoral division for the Greater London Council
- District: London Borough of Hounslow
- Population: 205,060 (1969 estimate)
- Electorate: 144,136 (1964); 141,858 (1967); 151,442 (1970)
- Area: 14,461.6 acres (58.524 km^{2})

Former electoral division
- Created: 1965
- Abolished: 1973
- Member(s): 3
- Replaced by: Brentford and Isleworth and Feltham and Heston

Hounslow was an electoral division for the purposes of elections to the Greater London Council. The constituency elected three councillors for a three-year term in 1964, 1967 and 1970.

== History ==
It was planned to use the same boundaries as the Westminster Parliament constituencies for election of councillors to the Greater London Council (GLC), as had been the practice for elections to the predecessor London County Council, but those that existed in 1965 crossed the Greater London boundary. Until new constituencies could be settled, the 32 London boroughs were used as electoral areas which therefore created a constituency called Hounslow.

The electoral division was replaced from 1973 by the single-member electoral divisions of Brentford and Isleworth and Feltham and Heston.

== Elections ==
The Hounslow constituency was used for the Greater London Council elections in 1964, 1967 and 1970. Three councillors were elected at each election using first-past-the-post voting.

=== 1964 election ===
The first election was held on 9 April 1964, a year before the council came into its powers. The electorate was 144,136 and three Labour Party councillors were elected. With 80,243 people voting, the turnout was 55.7%. The councillors were elected for a three-year term.

1964 Greater London Council election: Hounslow
Party	Candidate	Votes	%	±%
Labour	Jack Dunnett	40,684		
Labour	Ernest Kinghorn	38,028		
Labour	Frederick W. Powe	36,860		
Conservative	Geoffrey Chase-Gardener	32,044		
Conservative	Andrew Jardine	31,281		
Conservative	Dyas Cyril Loftus Usher	29,426		
Liberal	R. P. Power	7,457		
Liberal	G. C. Middleton	7,084		
Liberal	J. S. Probert	6,062		
Communist	F. Stanley	2,077		
Turnout				
Labour win (new seat)				
Labour win (new seat)				
Labour win (new seat)				

=== 1967 election ===
The second election was held on 13 April 1967. The electorate was 141,858 and three Conservative Party councillors were elected. With 73,511 people voting, the turnout was 51.8%. The councillors were elected for a three-year term.

1967 Greater London Council election: Hounslow
Party	Candidate	Votes	%	±%
Conservative	Geoffrey Chase Gardner	36,581		
Conservative	Dyas Cyril Loftus Usher	35,855		
Conservative	Andrew Jardine	35,784		
Labour	F. W. Powe	28,511		
Labour	Mrs. Y. Sieve	27,942		
Labour	J. O. N. Vickers	27,347		
Liberal	A. L. Day	5,904		
Liberal	S. L. Geary	5,620		
Liberal	R. B. Wynne	4,977		
Communist	W. H. Benson	1,526		
Turnout				
Conservative gain from Labour		Swing		
Conservative gain from Labour		Swing		
Conservative gain from Labour		Swing		

=== 1970 election ===
The third election was held on 9 April 1970. The electorate was 151,442 and three Conservative Party councillors were elected. With 65,014 people voting, the turnout was 42.9%. The councillors were elected for a three-year term.

1970 Greater London Council election: Hounslow
Party	Candidate	Votes	%	±%
Conservative	Geoffrey Chase-Gardner	32,464		
Conservative	Andrew Jardine	32,048		
Conservative	Dyas Cyril Loftus Usher	31,672		
Labour	F. W. Powe	27,910		
Labour	W. R. Sands	27,526		
Labour	A. A. W. Dix	27,482		
Liberal	A. L. Day	2,215		
Liberal	J. H. Beasley	1,813		
Liberal	W. P. Letch	1,661		
Homes before Roads	H. R. D. Beecham	1,285		
Homes before Roads	A. H. M. Best	1,108		
Communist	P. Rhodes	1,038		
Homes before Roads	D. F. M. Gamble	950		
Union Movement	R. J. Elderton	400		
Turnout				
Conservative hold		Swing		
Conservative hold		Swing		
Conservative hold		Swing		
