= Mitcham and Morden (electoral division) =

Electoral division in Greater London, 1973–1986

- Former electoral division for the Greater London Council
- District: Merton
- Electorate: 65,258 (1973); 64,000 (1977); 63,107 (1981)
- Area: 1,724 hectares (17.24 km^{2})

Former electoral division
- Created: 1973
- Abolished: 1986
- Member: 1
- Created from: Merton

Mitcham and Morden was an electoral division for the purposes of elections to the Greater London Council. The constituency elected one councillor for a four-year term in 1973, 1977 and 1981, with the final term extended for an extra year ahead of the abolition of the Greater London Council.

== History ==
It was planned to use the same boundaries as the Westminster Parliament constituencies for election of councillors to the Greater London Council (GLC), as had been the practice for elections to the predecessor London County Council, but those that existed in 1965 crossed the Greater London boundary. Until new constituencies could be settled, the 32 London boroughs were used as electoral areas. The London Borough of Merton formed the Merton electoral division. This was used for the Greater London Council elections in 1964, 1967 and 1970.

The new constituencies were settled following the Second Periodic Review of Westminster constituencies and the new electoral division matched the boundaries of the Mitcham and Morden parliamentary constituency.

It covered an area of 1,724 hectares (17.24 km^{2}).

== Elections ==
The Mitcham and Morden constituency was used for the Greater London Council elections in 1973, 1977 and 1981. One councillor was elected at each election using first-past-the-post voting.

=== 1973 election ===
The fourth election to the GLC (and first using revised boundaries) was held on 12 April 1973. The electorate was 65,258 and one Labour Party councillor was elected. The turnout was 39.9%. The councillor was elected for a three-year term. This was extended for an extra year in 1976 when the electoral cycle was switched to four-yearly.

1973 Greater London Council election: Mitcham and Morden
Party	Candidate	Votes	%	±%
Labour	Anthony Robert Judge	14,628	56.16	
Conservative	J. R. Yarwood	10,060	38.62	
Independent	G. L. Giddins	875	3.36	
Communist	S. E. French	485	1.86	
Turnout				
Labour win (new seat)				

=== 1977 election ===
The fifth election to the GLC (and second using revised boundaries) was held on 5 May 1977. The electorate was 64,000 and one Conservative Party councillor was elected. The turnout was 45.2%. The councillor was elected for a four-year term.

1977 Greater London Council election: Mitcham and Morden
Party	Candidate	Votes	%	±%
Conservative	Brian Joseph Shenton	15,039	51.97	
Labour	Anthony Robert Judge	10,907	37.70	
Liberal	D. J. Stockley	1,491	5.15	
National Front	A. F. Bailey	1,265	4.37	
Independent	J. F. F. Rooks	175	0.60	
GLC Abolitionist Campaign	G. Burt	54	0.19	
Turnout				
Conservative gain from Labour		Swing		

=== 1981 election ===
The sixth and final election to the GLC (and third using revised boundaries) was held on 7 May 1981. The electorate was 63,107 and one Labour Party councillor was elected. The turnout was 45.3%. The councillor was elected for a four-year term, extended by an extra year by the Local Government (Interim Provisions) Act 1984, ahead of the abolition of the council.

1981 Greater London Council election: Mitcham and Morden
Party	Candidate	Votes	%	±%
Labour	Anthony Robert Judge	13,299	46.50	
Conservative	Brian Joseph Shenton	10,588	37.03	
Liberal	Ronald A. Locke	3,681	12.88	
National Front	John R. Perryman	693	2.42	
Ecology	Roger C. Stanley	330	1.15	
Turnout				
Labour gain from Conservative		Swing		
