= Vauxhall (electoral division) =

Electoral division in Greater London, 1973–1986

- Former electoral division for the Greater London Council
- District: Lambeth
- Electorate: 48,264 (1973); 43,027 (1977); 39,065 (1980); 38,976 (1981); 38,328 (1985)
- Major settlements: Vauxhall
- Area: 572 hectares (5.72 km^{2})

Former electoral division
- Created: 1973
- Abolished: 1986
- Member: 1
- Created from: Lambeth

Vauxhall was an electoral division for the purposes of elections to the Greater London Council. The constituency elected one councillor for a four-year term in 1973, 1977 and 1981, with the final term extended for an extra year ahead of the abolition of the Greater London Council.

== History ==
It was planned to use the same boundaries as the Westminster Parliament constituencies for election of councillors to the Greater London Council (GLC), as had been the practice for elections to the predecessor London County Council, but those that existed in 1965 crossed the Greater London boundary. Until new constituencies could be settled, the 32 London boroughs were used as electoral areas. The London Borough of Lambeth formed the Lambeth electoral division. This was used for the Greater London Council elections in 1964, 1967 and 1970.

The new constituencies were settled following the Second Periodic Review of Westminster constituencies and the new electoral division matched the boundaries of the Vauxhall parliamentary constituency.

The area was in a long-term period of population decline that was yet to reverse. The electorate reduced from 48,264 in 1973 to 38,328 in 1985. It covered an area of 572 hectares (5.72 km^{2}).

== Elections ==
The Vauxhall constituency was used for the Greater London Council elections in 1973, 1977 and 1981. One councillor was elected at each election using first-past-the-post voting.

=== 1973 election ===
The fourth election to the GLC (and first using revised boundaries) was held on 12 April 1973. The electorate was 48,264 and one Labour Party councillor was elected. The turnout was 30.5%. The councillor was elected for a three-year term. This was extended for an extra year in 1976 when the electoral cycle was switched to four-yearly.

1973 Greater London Council election: Vauxhall
Party	Candidate	Votes	%	±%
Labour	Ewan Geddes Carr	10,821	73.56	
Conservative	Peter James Bottomley	3,396	23.10	
Communist	J. A. Henry	365	2.48	
Socialist (GB)	M. E. Sansum	121	0.82	
Turnout				
Labour win (new seat)				

=== 1977 election ===
The fifth election to the GLC (and second using revised boundaries) was held on 5 May 1977. The electorate was 43,027 and one Labour Party councillor was elected. The turnout was 33.6%. The councillor was elected for a four-year term.

1977 Greater London Council election: Vauxhall
Party	Candidate	Votes	%	±%
Labour	Ewan Geddes Carr	6,935	48.28	
Conservative	Clive W. Jones	5,868	40.85	
National Front	Colin P. K. Skeats	875	6.09	
Liberal	William F. Brown	538	3.74	
GLC Abolitionist Campaign	D. T. Riley	155	1.08	
Turnout				
Labour hold		Swing		

=== 1980 by-election ===
A by-election was held on 21 February 1980, following the death of E. G. Carr. The electorate was 39,065 and one Labour Party councillor was elected. The turnout was 21.9%.

Vauxhall by-election, 1980
Party	Candidate	Votes	%	±%
Labour	Brinley H. Davies	5,277	61.81	
Conservative	John Cradock Maples	2,608	30.55	
Liberal	John R. Hassall	333	3.90	
National Front	Vernon C. Atkinson	319	3.74	
Turnout				
Labour hold		Swing		

=== 1981 election ===
The sixth and final election to the GLC (and third using revised boundaries) was held on 7 May 1981. The electorate was 38,976 and one Labour Party councillor was elected. The turnout was 39.0%. The councillor was elected for a four-year term, extended by an extra year by the Local Government (Interim Provisions) Act 1984, ahead of the abolition of the council.

1981 Greater London Council election: Vauxhall
Party	Candidate	Votes	%	±%
Labour	Brinley H. Davies	7,383	48.71	
Conservative	Richard M. S. O'Sullivan	4,177	27.55	
Social Democratic Alliance	David M. Mason	2,262	14.92	
Liberal	John W. Parton	830	5.48	
National Front	Vernon C. Atkinson	508	3.35	
Turnout				
Labour hold		Swing		

=== 1985 by-election ===
A by-election was held on 11 July 1985, following the resignation of Brinley H. Davies. The by-election coincided with others in Putney and Romford. The electorate was 38,328 and one Alliance councillor was elected. The turnout was 24.7%.

Vauxhall by-election, 1985
Party	Candidate	Votes	%	±%
Alliance	Michael William Tuffrey	4,600	49.03	
Labour	Lorna M. Boreland	4,212	44.87	
National Front	John G. Wright	253	2.70	
Pro-Abolition Alliance	Simon H. Fawthrop	113	1.20	
Communist	David J. S. Cook	110	1.17	
Revolutionary Communist	Jean Smith	93	0.99	
Turnout				
Alliance gain from Labour		Swing		
