= Brentford and Isleworth (electoral division) =

Electoral division in Greater London, 1973–1986

- Former electoral division for the Greater London Council
- Brentford and Isleworth electoral division boundaries
- District: Hounslow
- Electorate: 72,297 (1973); 70,268 (1977); 71,189 (1981)
- Major settlements: Brentford, Chiswick and Isleworth
- Area: 2,455 hectares (24.55 km^{2})

Former electoral division
- Created: 1973
- Abolished: 1986
- Member: 1
- Created from: Hounslow

Brentford and Isleworth was an electoral division for the purposes of elections to the Greater London Council. The constituency elected one councillor for a four-year term in 1973, 1977 and 1981, with the final term extended for an extra year ahead of the abolition of the Greater London Council.

== History ==
It was planned to use the same boundaries as the Westminster Parliament constituencies for election of councillors to the Greater London Council (GLC), as had been the practice for elections to the predecessor London County Council, but those that existed in 1965 crossed the Greater London boundary. Until new constituencies could be settled, the 32 London boroughs were used as electoral areas. The London Borough of Hounslow formed the Hounslow electoral division. This was used for the Greater London Council elections in 1964, 1967 and 1970.

The new constituencies were settled following the Second Periodic Review of Westminster constituencies and the new electoral division matched the boundaries of the Brentford and Isleworth parliamentary constituency.

It covered an area of 2,455 hectares (24.55 km^{2}).

== Elections ==
The Brentford and Isleworth constituency was used for the Greater London Council elections in 1973, 1977 and 1981. One councillor was elected at each election using first-past-the-post voting.

=== 1973 election ===
The fourth election to the GLC (and first using revised boundaries) was held on 12 April 1973. The electorate was 72,297 and one Labour Party councillor was elected. The turnout was 45.0%. The councillor was elected for a three-year term. This was extended for an extra year in 1976 when the electoral cycle was switched to four-yearly.

1973 Greater London Council election: Brentford and Isleworth
Party	Candidate	Votes	%	±%
Labour	James Daly	17,428	53.54	
Conservative	Andrew Jardine	15,131	46.46	
Turnout				
Labour win (new seat)				

=== 1977 election ===
The fifth election to the GLC (and second using revised boundaries) was held on 5 May 1977. The electorate was 70,268 and one Conservative Party councillor was elected. The turnout was 52.9%. The councillor was elected for a four-year term.

1977 Greater London Council election: Brentford and Isleworth
Party	Candidate	Votes	%	±%
Conservative	George Nicholas Alexander Bailey	20,348	54.72	
Labour	James Daly	13,336	35.88	
Liberal	Michael A. Simmons	1,453	3.91	
National Front	Peter J. Attridge	1,290	3.47	
National Party	Ronald W. Coker	507	1.36	
GLC Abolitionist Campaign	M. J. Taylor	148	0.40	
Independent Liberal	M. E. Ferguson	109	0.29	
Turnout				
Conservative gain from Labour		Swing		

=== 1981 election ===
The sixth and final election to the GLC (and third using revised boundaries) was held on 7 May 1981. The electorate was 71,189 and one Conservative Party councillor was elected. The turnout was 51.5%. The councillor was elected for a four-year term, extended by an extra year by the Local Government (Interim Provisions) Act 1984, ahead of the abolition of the council.

1981 Greater London Council election: Brentford and Isleworth
Party	Candidate	Votes	%	±%
Conservative	George Nicholas Alexander Bailey	17,695	48.23	
Labour	Roy G. Gregory	15,091	41.15	
Liberal	Joan B. Longrognat	3,342	9.11	
Save London Action Group	Paul A. Hughes-Smith	233	0.64	
Independent	Reginald E. G. Simmerson	201	0.55	
Constitutional Movement	Gareth D. Pearce	104	0.28	
Turnout				
Conservative hold		Swing		
