= Merton (electoral division) =

Electoral division in Greater London, 1965–1973

- Former electoral division for the Greater London Council
- Merton electoral division boundaries
- District: London Borough of Merton
- Population: 183,570 (1969 estimate)
- Electorate: 134,520 (1964); 132,117 (1967); 138,741 (1970)
- Area: 9,379.2 acres (37.956 km^{2})

Former electoral division
- Created: 1965
- Abolished: 1973
- Member(s): 2
- Replaced by: Mitcham and Morden and Wimbledon

Merton was an electoral division for the purposes of elections to the Greater London Council. The constituency elected two councillors for a three-year term in 1964, 1967 and 1970.

== History ==
It was planned to use the same boundaries as the Westminster Parliament constituencies for election of councillors to the Greater London Council (GLC), as had been the practice for elections to the predecessor London County Council, but those that existed in 1965 crossed the Greater London boundary. Until new constituencies could be settled, the 32 London boroughs were used as electoral areas which therefore created a constituency called Merton.

The electoral division was replaced from 1973 by the single-member electoral divisions of Mitcham and Morden and Wimbledon.

== Elections ==
The Merton constituency was used for the Greater London Council elections in 1964, 1967 and 1970. Two councillors were elected at each election using first-past-the-post voting.

=== 1964 election ===
The first election was held on 9 April 1964, a year before the council came into its powers. The electorate was 134,520 and two Conservative Party councillors were elected. With 69,148 people voting, the turnout was 51.4%. The councillors were elected for a three-year term.

1964 Greater London Council election: Merton
Party	Candidate	Votes	%	±%
Conservative	Thomas William Scott	29,920		
Conservative	Frederick William Walker	29,895		
Labour	C. M. Waugh	28,752		
Labour	J. T. Pyne	27,108		
Liberal	E. M. Morrison	6,753		
Liberal	J. S. Rowlinson	6,676		
Communist	S. E. French	1,552		
Union Movement	D. Wheeler	1,409		
Turnout				
Conservative win (new seat)				
Conservative win (new seat)				

=== 1967 election ===
The second election was held on 13 April 1967. The electorate was 132,117 and two Conservative Party councillors were elected. With 68,858 people voting, the turnout was 52.1%. The councillors were elected for a three-year term.

1967 Greater London Council election: Merton
Party	Candidate	Votes	%	±%
Conservative	Thomas William Scott	38,941		
Conservative	Frederick William Walker	38,514		
Labour	E. W. Goodall	23,069		
Labour	P. F. Inman	22,128		
Liberal	R. A. Locke	4,963		
Liberal	J. S. Rowlinson	4,764		
Communist	S. E. French	1,227		
Turnout				
Conservative hold		Swing		
Conservative hold		Swing		

=== 1970 election ===
The third election was held on 9 April 1970. The electorate was 138,741 and two Conservative Party councillors were elected. With 54,777 people voting, the turnout was 39.5%. The councillors were elected for a three-year term.

1970 Greater London Council election: Merton
Party	Candidate	Votes	%	±%
Conservative	Frederick William Walker	31,467		
Conservative	Stanley Charles Bolton	31,205		
Labour	E. I. Marshall	18,845		
Labour	D. T. Miller	18,554		
Liberal	R. A. Locke	2,596		
Liberal	J. D. Norgate	2,253		
Homes before Roads	B. O'Sullivan	632		
Communist	S. E. French	624		
Homes before Roads	T. King	597		
Union Movement	R. Clare	315		
Turnout				
Conservative hold		Swing		
Conservative hold		Swing		
