= Norwood (electoral division) =

Electoral division in Greater London, 1973–1986

- Former electoral division for the Greater London Council
- Norwood electoral division boundaries
- District: Lambeth
- Electorate: 52,983 (1973); 50,878 (1977); 47,603 (1981)
- Major settlements: West Norwood
- Area: 800 hectares (8.0 km^{2})

Former electoral division
- Created: 1973
- Abolished: 1986
- Member: 1
- Created from: Lambeth

Norwood was an electoral division for the purposes of elections to the Greater London Council. The constituency elected one councillor for a four-year term in 1973, 1977 and 1981, with the final term extended for an extra year ahead of the abolition of the Greater London Council.

== History ==
It was planned to use the same boundaries as the Westminster Parliament constituencies for election of councillors to the Greater London Council (GLC), as had been the practice for elections to the predecessor London County Council, but those that existed in 1965 crossed the Greater London boundary. Until new constituencies could be settled, the 32 London boroughs were used as electoral areas. The London Borough of Lambeth formed the Lambeth electoral division. This was used for the Greater London Council elections in 1964, 1967 and 1970.

The new constituencies were settled following the Second Periodic Review of Westminster constituencies and the new electoral division matched the boundaries of the Norwood parliamentary constituency.

The area was in a long-term period of population decline that was yet to reverse. The electorate reduced from 52,983 in 1973 to 47,603 in 1981. It covered an area of 800 hectares (8.0 km^{2}).

== Elections ==
The Norwood constituency was used for the Greater London Council elections in 1973, 1977 and 1981. One councillor was elected at each election using first-past-the-post voting. Ken Livingstone, who was elected from the constituency in 1973, was Leader of the Greater London Council from 1981 to 1986. He was later elected to represent Hackney North and Stoke Newington in 1977 and Paddington in 1981.

=== 1973 election ===
The fourth election to the GLC (and first using revised boundaries) was held on 12 April 1973. The electorate was 44,215 and one Labour Party councillor was elected. The turnout was 40.7%. The councillor was elected for a three-year term. This was extended for an extra year in 1976 when the electoral cycle was switched to four-yearly.

1973 Greater London Council election: Norwood
Party	Candidate	Votes	%	±%
Labour	Kenneth Robert Livingstone	11,622	53.95	
Conservative	Michael Peter Russell Malynn	8,007	37.17	
Liberal	Michael Frederick Drake	1,819	8.44	
Socialist (GB)	H. Young	95	0.44	
Turnout				
Labour win (new seat)				

=== 1977 election ===
The fifth election to the GLC (and second using revised boundaries) was held on 5 May 1977. The electorate was 50,878 and one Conservative Party councillor was elected. The turnout was 43.3%. The councillor was elected for a four-year term.

1977 Greater London Council election: Norwood
Party	Candidate	Votes	%	±%
Conservative	Norman John David Smith	10,462	47.59	
Labour	Edward Robert Knight	9,110	41.44	
National Front	T. A. Mitchell	1,143	5.20	
Liberal	David J. Charlesworth	1,128	5.13	
GLC Abolitionist Campaign	I. T. Roberts	139	0.63	
Turnout				
Conservative gain from Labour		Swing		

=== 1981 election ===
The sixth and final election to the GLC (and third using revised boundaries) was held on 7 May 1981. The electorate was 47,603 and one Conservative Party councillor was elected. The turnout was 52.2%. The councillor was elected for a four-year term, extended by an extra year by the Local Government (Interim Provisions) Act 1984, ahead of the abolition of the council.

1981 Greater London Council election: Norwood
Party	Candidate	Votes	%	±%
Conservative	Prof. Norman John David Smith	10,700	43.20	
Labour	Edward Robert Knight	8,107	32.73	
Social Democratic Alliance	Stephen Michael Alan Haseler	3,709	14.97	
Liberal	Fraser K. Murrey	1,443	5.82	
National Front	Catherine M. Williams	423	1.71	
Ratepayers Watchdog	Bernard Webb	317	1.28	
Fair Rates, Anti-Corruption	Sidney A. Chaney	73	0.29	
Turnout				
Conservative hold		Swing		
