= Social Democratic Alliance (UK) =

The Social Democratic Alliance (SDA) was a political organisation in the United Kingdom. Founded in 1975 as an anti-communist group within the Labour Party, it was dissolved following the establishment of the Social Democratic Party in 1981.

== Foundation ==
The group was founded in June 1975 by councillors and other individuals on the right wing of the Labour Party. Peter Stephenson, the editor of Socialist Commentary, became its chairman. The group claimed to stand in the tradition of Hugh Gaitskell's Campaign for Democratic Socialism, and claimed the support of Cabinet members Roy Jenkins and Reg Prentice. It initially focussed on anti-communism, and on supporting Labour MPs who backed the government's economic strategy against deselection attempts.

== Activities in the 1970s ==
At the party conference, the group accused eleven members of Labour's National Executive Committee of being communist sympathisers. This position was disowned by Jenkins and by Shirley Williams, and as a result, Stephenson resigned and called for the group to be disbanded. He was replaced by Roger Fox, while Douglas Eden and Stephen Haseler became the organisation's secretaries. They built links with the Trade Union Education Centre for Democratic Socialism and the Common Cause industry pressure group. They won publicity the following year by publishing a list of Labour MPs they alleged were linked with communist organisations, including Michael Foot, Tony Benn and Neil Kinnock. Further similar allegations led the founders of the Campaign for Labour Victory to explicitly avoid any links, although they did achieve coverage in Conservative-supporting newspapers during the 1979 general election campaign. The group also called for voters not to support the Labour candidate in Liverpool at the 1979 European Parliament election.

== Expulsion from the Labour Party ==
In 1980, the SDA announced that they would stand candidates against left-wing Labour MPs at the next general election, unless the party marginalised them. They also published a manifesto, which gained the support of MP Neville Sandelson. The Scunthorpe Democratic Labour Alliance, a small Labour Party breakaway, merged with the SDA, followed by Dick Taverne's Lincoln Democratic Labour Association. The plans to stand against Labour candidates led the party to expel the SDA's leading members, although most were re-admitted on appeal. The group refused to co-operate with a Labour enquiry into the activities of groups within the party, and in November it supported a candidate in Scunthorpe against the official Labour candidate, leading the party to proscribe membership of the SDA in December.

== Formation of a new party ==
In January 1981, the SDA jointly organised a conference to discuss founding a social democratic party with Colin Phipps' Association of Democratic Groups, and George Brown was appointed as its new president. They were overtaken by events, as Jenkins, Williams, David Owen and Bill Rodgers – popularly known as the "Gang of Four" – formed the Council for Social Democracy. The SDA said that they hoped to form the local structure of a new organisation.

Despite opposition from the Gang of Four, the SDA immediately began negotiating local pacts with the Liberal Party, and stood ten candidates in the 1981 Greater London Council election. None came close to being elected, but Stephen Haseler's candidacy in Lambeth, Norwood did effectively prevent Labour's Ted Knight from winning the seat.

Once the Gang of Four had officially founded the Social Democratic Party, the SDA dissolved itself into it. Haseler stood to become president of the new party against Williams and Rodgers, but took last place in the poll.

== See also ==
- List of Labour Party breakaway parties (UK)
