= Bill Boaks =

Royal Navy officer and political activist (1904–1986)

Bill Boaks DSC
- Born: 25 May 1904; Walthamstow, London
- Died: 4 April 1986 (aged 81); Tooting, London
- Military career
- Allegiance: United Kingdom
- Branch: Royal Navy
- Service years: 1920–1949
- Rank: Lieutenant commander
- Units: HMS Basilisk; HMS Rodney
- Conflicts: World War II • Dunkirk evacuation • Last battle of the Bismarck
- Awards: Distinguished Service Cross
- Other work: Campaigner for Road Safety

Lieutenant Commander William George Boaks DSC (25 May 1904 – 4 April 1986) was a British Royal Navy officer who became a political campaigner for road safety. A pioneer of British eccentric political campaigning, he jointly held the record for the fewest votes recorded for a candidate in a British parliamentary election, taking five at a by-election in 1982.

== Early life ==
Boaks was born in Walthamstow, into a naval family. His father, William, was a sales clerk for a fruit merchant. He was educated at the Royal Naval College, Greenwich.

Boaks entered the Royal Navy in 1920, aged 16, as a boy seaman, and was promoted from acting sub-lieutenant to sub-lieutenant on 1 December 1928. He was granted a temporary commission as a flying officer while on attachment to the Royal Air Force between 2 October 1930 and 7 May 1931, and was promoted to lieutenant on 1 December 1931, and to lieutenant commander on 1 December 1939.

Boaks was awarded the Distinguished Service Cross for his part in the Dunkirk evacuation in May 1940, during which his ship HMS Basilisk was sunk, and also took part in the sinking of the Bismarck while serving as a gunnery officer on board HMS Rodney in May 1941.

He served in the Navy for nearly thirty years, becoming a qualified submarine officer and deep-sea diver. He was amongst the first Allied officers at Nagasaki and Hiroshima. Boaks retired from the Navy in May 1949. He moved to Streatham and worked as an executive officer of the Building Apprenticeship Training Council. Boaks applied for the vacant position of Chief Constable of Berkshire in 1958 but was not offered an interview.

== Political career ==
=== Political campaigning ===
==== 1950s ====
Boaks' first candidacy for election was at the 1951 general election. Boaks contested Walthamstow East as an independent candidate for Admiral, or the "Association of Democratic Monarchists Representing All Women". He had intended to stand against the Prime Minister, Clement Attlee, but stood for the wrong seat (Attlee's constituency was Walthamstow West). Boaks' campaign advocated equal pay for women, subsidised apprenticeships and the sale of council houses. Boaks received 174 votes, finishing in last place with 0.4% of the vote.

Following his candidacy at Walthamstow East, Boaks continued a career as an eccentric campaigner. To publicise his campaigns, Boaks initially used his Vauxhall 12 car, which he named Josephine and painted as a zebra crossing, complete with loudspeakers and placards. In later campaigns, owing to a lack of money, Boaks used a 140lb armoured bicycle which concealed an iron bedstead. The armoured bicycle included a camera for taking photographs of motorists breaking the law and featured an eight-foot flagpole with sloganeering banners. The bike was eventually hijacked and taken to Aberystwyth; Boaks was unable to afford the £20 to have it repaired. In September 1952, Boaks was fined twenty shillings at Bow Street Court for using a motor vehicle for advertising. He was fined a further twenty shillings a year later at Mansion House Magistrates Court on the same charge.

In 1953 he was a Liberal candidate for Streatham Hill ward in the Wandsworth Metropolitan Borough Council elections.

In the 1950s, Boaks became involved in a series of legal cases in which he launched private prosecutions of public figures who had been involved in road accidents. These included Lady Attlee, Prince Philip, Princess Anne and R.A. Butler. Boaks accused Butler, who was then Home Secretary, of being an accomplice to a policeman who drove Butler to the House of Commons and had committed six traffic offences in Parliament Square. In light of this, Boaks was not interviewed when he applied to be Chief Constable of Berkshire in 1958.

On 2 April 1955, before the start of an England-Scotland football match at Wembley Stadium, Boaks stopped his van outside and refused to move until all the spectators had crossed the road in front of it. Two hours later, he stopped his car at a roundabout on Cambridge Circus, again refusing to move until pedestrians crossed. He was subsequently convicted of two counts of obstructing the highway and fined £5. On 1 October 1955, Boaks stopped his car at the Strand, and was convicted again of obstructing the highway, and incarcerated for a week in Brixton Prison. Boaks sued for wrongful imprisonment and sought £10,000 in damages; his case was dismissed in June 1956, as was his appeal in November 1956, and the House of Lords refused his petition to hear his appeal.

Boaks stood again in the 1956 by-election in Walthamstow West, finishing in last place, with 89 votes.

On 13 July 1959, Boaks entered the Bleriot Race to travel from Marble Arch in London to the Arc de Triomphe in Paris by any form of transport. Boaks opted to enter the race by rollerskate.

==== 1960s ====
In February 1961, Boaks unsuccessfully applied for planning permission to build a heliport in his garden. Boaks subsequently submitted further applications to Lambeth London Borough Council, including a proposal to build an underground hangar for eight civil defence helicopters. Boaks hoped that people would give up their cars and travel by bus or helicopter instead. To this end he proposed that landing pads should be installed in every city.

In June 1963, Boaks attempted to prosecute Ernest Robert Wilkin for dangerous driving. Boaks had allowed two girls to cross the road at a green light, which had led Wilkin to run over one of them. The court dismissed the case and awarded Wilkin fifty guineas.

Boaks sued the South London Press for libel after it described him as "nutty" on 27 March 1962. He also sued the London Evening News for libel after it falsely claimed he was living on National Assistance on 18 March 1966. In the latter case, he won notional damages of £1, and later complained to the Court of Appeal that the judge had misdirected the jury; he lost the appeal.

Over the years, Boaks's political label changed. In one election, he stood as the "Trains & Boats & Planes" candidate – the title of a contemporary popular song. After revisions to electoral law allowed candidates to have a six-word description of their candidature on the ballot paper, he eventually settled on "Public Safety Democratic Monarchist White Resident".

He would campaign intermittently by cycling around the target constituency, wearing a large cardboard box daubed with his slogans. He was limited to six words of description on the ballot paper, and usually described himself as "Air, Road, Public Safety, White Resident" or "Democratic Monarchist, Public Safety, White Resident".

Boaks stood for election to Lambeth London Borough Council in 1964, 1968 and 1971, standing for the ward of Town Hall in the first election and for that of Streatham Wells in the last two. He also stood in the by-election for the ward of St. Leonard's on 27 June 1968.

He stood for election to the Greater London Council in Lambeth in 1964 and 1970, at the Greenwich by-election in 1967, Lambeth Central in 1977 and Streatham in 1973 and 1981.

==== 1970s and 1980s ====
At some point in the early 1970s, a compulsory purchase order was issued on Boaks' home by Lambeth Council. Boaks moved to Kingston Road in Wimbledon Chase as a result.

In the 1970s and 1980s, Boaks's political career moved from his motorised public campaigning and subsequent court cases to standing as an eccentric campaigner in parliamentary elections and by-elections. Boaks contested the Clapham constituency at the 1970 general election, receiving 80 votes. He had intended to contest the Liverpool Scotland by-election of 1971, but failed to place his £150 deposit on time. He stood for his home constituencies of Streatham and Wimbledon at the February 1974 general election; in the latter, he received 240 votes, which was his highest ever number of votes.

Boaks contested the ward of Wimbledon South for Merton London Borough Council in the 1974 local election. Boaks subsequently stood in all of the local by-elections for Merton London Borough Council between 1974 and 1978 as "Air Road Public Safety White Resident". He also stood in the Merton Park ward by-election in 1980 as "Public Safety, Democratic Monarchist, White Resident".

Boaks contested the 1976 by-election in Carshalton, which marked the beginning of 18 parliamentary by-elections he would contest in the 47th and 48th Parliaments of the United Kingdom. Boaks would visit a constituency to secure the ten names required to be nominated as a candidate, and would not campaign in the constituency.

At the Glasgow Hillhead by-election in March 1982, he received just five votes, a new record low for a candidate in any British parliamentary election. The feat was remarkable, given that it meant fewer people voted for him than gave their names for his nomination as a candidate. Boaks' record stood until the 2005 general election.

In November 1982, Boaks received head injuries in a road accident, dissuading him from further pursuing his electoral career. He nevertheless attended the count at the Bermondsey by-election as counting agent for Screaming Lord Sutch in 1983. But there was also the simple matter that his money was running out. Boaks had planned to be the Official Monster Raving Loony Party's candidate for the 1983 general election, standing in Streatham; however, this plan never came to pass.

Boaks never received a vote share exceeding 0.5%, meaning that he lost all his £150 deposits. In all Boaks' political career, he lost over £4,200 in deposits.

=== Political views ===
==== Road safety ====
Boaks's main concern was public safety on the roads. He was a major advocate of pedestrian and non-motor vehicle traffic rights, and a need for additional care in road safety. He advocated transporting freight by rail and using helicopters to alleviate traffic congestion. Under the guise of the British National Airways National Heliport Network and Central London Airport and Aerodrome Association, he proposed to close inland airports, including Heathrow Airport, and replace them with a series of coastal airports. He also noted and highlighted the problems caused by pollution and the damage caused to properties beside roads favoured by heavy goods vehicles. Boaks wanted the inversion of the law concerning zebra crossings, so that all roadways would be treated as if they were zebra crossings except those parts painted as such, thus giving pedestrians the right of way at all times.

To reinforce his point, Boaks would sometimes deliberately hold up traffic at crossings. He later took to pushing a trolley or pram full of bricks back and forth repeatedly at zebra crossings. He would sit in a deckchair in the overtaking lane of the Westway in North Kensington, reading The Daily Telegraph.

==== Anti-establishment ====
Boaks' political views tended towards an increasing distrust of the establishment, fuelled by his frequent court appearances. He was against Communism and homosexuality in the civil service. Journalists, some of whom seem to have been scared of him, often expressed confusion over his claims, as they never quite knew whether he was being serious or simply having fun at their expense. For example, when deciding not to fight the Croydon North West by-election in 1981, he said that he would never fight in Croydon as he believed that the "Communist menace" was never a threat there. He also said on at least one occasion that he believed that homosexuals should be debarred from the Civil Service, as he thought they were more vulnerable to blackmail by foreign powers.

==== Attitudes to race relations ====
Boaks's "White Resident" label led to him being labelled as racist by the Anti-Nazi League, but Boaks chose this mostly as a means of provoking left-wingers, whom he disliked (despite having a number of rather left-wing views of his own, particularly on the Health Service), and partly as he hoped to undercut votes for the National Front (NF) and similar parties. Boaks was contemptuous of the NF, having stood against a number of its members in the 1950s and 1960s when they belonged to more openly neo-Nazi groups, such as John Bean's British National Party, Colin Jordan's White Defence League and Oswald Mosley's Union Movement. The "White Resident" tag was also a means of more easily attracting media attention during the heated debate over immigration in the 1970s in the UK, in order to push his "Public Safety" agenda.

Boaks's stance led to his becoming the first promoter of ethnic minority candidates in United Kingdom elections. His usual set-piece response when confronted over his label by anyone non-white was to say: "Why 'White Resident'? Because that's what I am!" He would then grab the questioner's hand, slap a pound note into it and say: "Now find 149 more of those [the deposit then being £150] and stand as a 'Black Immigrant' candidate for what YOU believe in. If you don't, who will?" Boaks reckoned that he had given away a couple of hundred pounds in this manner.

=== Summary of parliamentary election results ===
Parliamentary election	Constituency	Description	Votes	%	Result
1951 general election	Walthamstow East	Independent	174	0.4%	4th of 4
1956 by-election	Walthamstow West	Independent	89	0.4%	4th of 4
1970 general election	Clapham	Independent	80	0.2%	5th of 5
February 1974 general election	Streatham	Independent	45	0.1%	5th of 5
February 1974 general election	Wimbledon	Independent	240	0.4%	4th of 4
1976 by-election	Carshalton	Air, Road, Public Safety, White Resident	115	0.3%	6th of 6
1976 by-election	Walsall North	Air, Road, Public Safety, White Resident	30	0.1%	9th of 9
1977 by-election	City of London and Westminster South	Air, Road, Public Safety, White Resident	61	0.3%	8th of 10
1977 by-election	Birmingham Ladywood	Air Road Public Safety	46	0.3%	10th of 10
1977 by-election	Bournemouth East	Democratic Monarchist, Public Safety, White Resident	42	0.2%	7th of 7
1978 by-election	Ilford North	Democratic Monarchist, Public Safety, White Resident	38	0.1%	8th of 8
1978 by-election	Lambeth Central	Democratic Monarchist	27	0.1%	11th of 11
1979 by-election	Liverpool Edge Hill	Democratic Monarchist, Public Safety, White Resident	32	0.2%	7th of 7
1979 general election	Newham North East	Democratic Monarchist Public Safety White Resident	118	0.3%	7th of 7
1979 general election	North Devon	Democratic Monarchist Public Safety White Resident	20	0.0%	9th of 9
1979 by-election	Manchester Central	Democratic Monarchist, Public Safety, White Resident	12	0.1%	6th of 6
1980 by-election	Southend East	Democratic Monarchist, Public Safety, White Resident	23	0.0%	7th of 7
1981 by-election	Warrington	Democratic Monarchist	14	0.1%	9th of 11
1981 by-election	Croydon North West	Democratic Monarchist, Public Safety, White Resident	51	0.2%	9th of 12
1981 by-election	Crosby	Democratic Monarchist, Public Safety, White Resident	36	0.1%	7th of 9
1982 by-election	Glasgow Hillhead	Democratic Monarchist Public Safety White Resident	5	0.0%	8th of 8
1982 by-election	Beaconsfield	Democratic Monarchist, Public Safety, White Resident	99	0.3%	5th of 6
1982 by-election	Mitcham and Morden	Democratic Monarchist	66	0.2%	7th of 9
1982 by-election	Peckham	Democratic Monarchist, Public Safety, White Resident	102	0.5%	5th of 5
1982 by-election	Birmingham Northfield	Democratic Monarchist, Public Safety, White Resident	60	0.1%	7th of 7

== Personal life ==
Boaks married Ivy June Colier in 1930, with whom he had three children.

== Spelling of surname ==
Bill Boaks' surname is often spelt Boakes in publications. In at least one case both spellings are used in the same article.

== Death and legacy ==
In 1984, Boaks was injured in a second minor road traffic incident while getting off a bus. Following the incident, he rarely left his home, except for twice-weekly visits to the hospital. As a result of complications from the head injuries he sustained, he died of pneumonia and heart failure at St George's Hospital in Tooting on 4 April 1986.

Boaks' funeral was attended by the Minister of Transport, Peter Bottomley. He was buried at sea with full honours in the naval graveyard outside Portsmouth Harbour.

Boaks's legacies include:

- Pedestrianisation of London's Carnaby Street, which he took an active part in campaigning for, along with Screaming Lord Sutch, and which has set the precedent for pedestrian precincts elsewhere in the UK.
- HMS Belfast, which is moored near Tower Bridge in London as a tourist attraction. It was Boaks' advice as to the depths of the waters of the Thames that persuaded the Royal Navy of the ship's viability as a floating museum rather than scrapping her.
