= Holborn and St Pancras South (electoral division) =

Electoral division in Greater London, 1973–1986

- Former electoral division for the Greater London Council
- Holborn and St Pancras South electoral division boundaries
- District: Camden
- Electorate: 39,751 (1973); 39,351 (1977); 40,337 (1979); 38,339 (1981)
- Area: 532 hectares (5.32 km^{2}) (1973); 530 hectares (5.3 km^{2}) (1977/1981)

Former electoral division
- Created: 1973
- Abolished: 1986
- Member: 1
- Created from: Camden

Holborn and St Pancras South was an electoral division for the purposes of elections to the Greater London Council. The constituency elected one councillor for a four-year term in 1973, 1977 and 1981, with the final term extended for an extra year ahead of the abolition of the Greater London Council.

== History ==
It was planned to use the same boundaries as the Westminster Parliament constituencies for election of councillors to the Greater London Council (GLC), as had been the practice for elections to the predecessor London County Council, but those that existed in 1965 crossed the Greater London boundary. Until new constituencies could be settled, the 32 London boroughs were used as electoral areas. The London Borough of Camden formed the Camden electoral division. This was used for the Greater London Council elections in 1964, 1967 and 1970.

The new constituencies were settled following the Second Periodic Review of Westminster constituencies and the new electoral division matched the boundaries of the Holborn and St Pancras South parliamentary constituency.

It covered an area of 532 hectares (5.32 km^{2}) in 1973. Revisions to ward boundaries in the London Borough of Camden changed the area of the division to 530 hectares (5.3 km^{2}) for the 1977 and 1981 elections.

== Elections ==
The Holborn and St Pancras South constituency was used for the Greater London Council elections in 1973, 1977 and 1981. One councillor was elected at each election using first-past-the-post voting.

=== 1973 election ===
The fourth election to the GLC (and first using revised boundaries) was held on 12 April 1973. The electorate was 39,751 and one Labour Party councillor was elected. The turnout was 30.9%. The councillor was elected for a three-year term. This was extended for an extra year in 1976 when the electoral cycle was switched to four-yearly.

1973 Greater London Council election: Holborn and St Pancras South
Party	Candidate	Votes	%	±%
Labour	Alexander John Kazantzis	7,437	60.57	
Conservative	D. P. Weeks	3,520	28.67	
Liberal	A. Elithorn	1,085	8.84	
Socialist (GB)	D. M. Davies	99	0.81	
Independent	N. S. Fierz	72	0.59	
Independent	P. Goulstone	60	0.49	
Turnout				
Labour win (new seat)				

=== 1977 election ===
The fifth election to the GLC (and second using revised boundaries) was held on 5 May 1977. The electorate was 39,351 and one Labour Party councillor was elected. The turnout was 39.9%. The councillor was elected for a four-year term.

1977 Greater London Council election: Holborn and St Pancras South
Party	Candidate	Votes	%	±%
Labour	Richard Collins	7,099	45.21	
Conservative	C. D. Radmore	6,977	44.45	
Liberal	G. Knowles	776	4.94	
National Front	J. Lilburne-Philpot	698	4.44	
Socialist (GB)	P. M. Deutz	156	0.99	
Turnout				
Labour hold		Swing		

=== 1979 by-election ===
A by-election was held on 8 March 1979, following the death of Richard Collins. The electorate was 40,337 and one Labour Party councillor was elected. The turnout was 31.7%.

Holborn and St Pancras South by-election, 1979
Party	Candidate	Votes	%	±%
Labour	Charles Andrew Rossi	5,946	46.50	
Conservative	Christopher D. Radmore	5,833	45.63	
Liberal	Thomas Hibbert	437	3.42	
National Front	Francis T. Theobald	372	2.91	
Independent	Helen Bunney	200	1.56	
Turnout				
Labour hold		Swing		

=== 1981 election ===
The sixth and final election to the GLC (and third using revised boundaries) was held on 7 May 1981. The electorate was 38,339 and one Labour Party councillor was elected. The turnout was 38.5%. The councillor was elected for a four-year term, extended by an extra year by the Local Government (Interim Provisions) Act 1984, ahead of the abolition of the council.

1981 Greater London Council election: Holborn and St Pancras South
Party	Candidate	Votes	%	±%
Labour	Charles Andrew Rossi	7,796	52.83	
Conservative	Richard G. Bull	5,051	34.24	
Liberal	Roger Karn	1,694	11.48	
Constitutional Movement	Paul T. Kavanagh	218	1.48	
Turnout				
Labour hold		Swing		
