= Streatham (electoral division) =

Electoral division in Greater London, 1973–1986

- Former electoral division for the Greater London Council
- District: Lambeth
- Electorate: 57,924 (1973); 55,965 (1977); 52,078 (1981)
- Major settlements: Streatham
- Area: 821 hectares (8.21 km^{2})

Former electoral division
- Created: 1973
- Abolished: 1986
- Member: 1
- Created from: Lambeth

Streatham was an electoral division for the purposes of elections to the Greater London Council. The constituency elected one councillor for a four-year term in 1973, 1977 and 1981, with the final term extended for an extra year ahead of the abolition of the Greater London Council.

== History ==
It was planned to use the same boundaries as the Westminster Parliament constituencies for election of councillors to the Greater London Council (GLC), as had been the practice for elections to the predecessor London County Council, but those that existed in 1965 crossed the Greater London boundary. Until new constituencies could be settled, the 32 London boroughs were used as electoral areas. The London Borough of Lambeth formed the Lambeth electoral division. This was used for the Greater London Council elections in 1964, 1967 and 1970.

The new constituencies were settled following the Second Periodic Review of Westminster constituencies and the new electoral division matched the boundaries of the Streatham parliamentary constituency.

The area was in a long-term period of population decline that was yet to reverse. The electorate reduced from 57,924 in 1973 to 52,078 in 1981. It covered an area of 821 hectares (8.21 km^{2}).

== Elections ==
The Streatham constituency was used for the Greater London Council elections in 1973, 1977 and 1981. One councillor was elected at each election using first-past-the-post voting.

=== 1973 election ===
The fourth election to the GLC (and first using revised boundaries) was held on 12 April 1973. The electorate was 57,924 and one Conservative Party councillor was elected. The turnout was 38.3%. The councillor was elected for a three-year term. This was extended for an extra year in 1976 when the electoral cycle was switched to four-yearly.

1973 Greater London Council election: Streatham
Party	Candidate	Votes	%	±%
Conservative	Diana Elizabeth Geddes	10,492	47.25	
Labour	Hugh H. Walker	9,426	42.44	
Liberal	Allan Mitchell	2,114	9.52	
Socialist (GB)	F. W. Simkins	120	0.54	
Independent	William George Boaks	57	0.26	
Turnout				
Conservative win (new seat)				

=== 1977 election ===
The fifth election to the GLC (and second using revised boundaries) was held on 5 May 1977. The electorate was 55,965 and one Conservative Party councillor was elected. The turnout was 40.7%. The councillor was elected for a four-year term.

1977 Greater London Council election: Streatham
Party	Candidate	Votes	%	±%
Conservative	Frederick W. Weyer	14,236	62.64	
Labour	D. J. Dahl	5,934	26.11	
Liberal	A. J. Mould	1,285	5.66	
National Front	Vera F. Lillington	1,041	4.58	
GLC Abolitionist Campaign	P. J. Moncrieff	224	0.99	
Turnout				
Conservative hold		Swing		

=== 1981 election ===
The sixth and final election to the GLC (and third using revised boundaries) was held on 7 May 1981. The electorate was 52,078 and one Conservative Party councillor was elected. The turnout was 47.9%. The councillor was elected for a four-year term, extended by an extra year by the Local Government (Interim Provisions) Act 1984, ahead of the abolition of the council.

1981 Greater London Council election: Streatham
Party	Candidate	Votes	%	±%
Conservative	Frederick W. Weyer	13,340	53.62	
Labour	Michael Frederick Drake	7,259	29.17	
Liberal	Christine L. Headley	3,732	14.99	
National Front	John G. Wright	344	1.38	
Independent	M. C. Gowar	126	0.51	
Independent	William George Boaks	82	0.33	
Turnout				
Conservative hold		Swing		
