= Ted Knight (politician) =

British politician (1933–2020)

Leader of Lambeth Council
- In office 1978 – May 1982
- Preceded by: David Stimpson
- Succeeded by: Robin Pitt
- In office November 1982 – 1986
- Preceded by: Robin Pitt
- Succeeded by: Linda Bellos

Member of Lambeth Council for Knight's Hill
- In office 2 May 1974 – 4 May 1978

Member of Lambeth Council for Ferndale
- In office 4 May 1978 – 8 May 1986

Personal details
- Born: 13 June 1933 Brixton, London, England
- Died: 30 March 2020 (aged 86) London, England
- Party: Labour

Edward Robert Knight (13 June 1933 – 30 March 2020) was a local politician in London, England, who was leader of Lambeth London Borough Council from 1978 until he was disqualified as a councillor in 1986.

== Early years ==
Edward Knight was born in Brixton in 1933. After leaving Strand Grammar School in Tulse Hill, he was employed as an insurance clerk. He joined ASSET, which later became the ASTMS trade union, and was a member of the Labour League of Youth from the age of 15. In 1954, Knight was expelled from the Labour Party after the National Executive Committee accused him of supporting Socialist Outlook, a proscribed newspaper whose editorial policy was controlled by a covert Trotskyist organisation known as The Club. With his fellow expellees, he was then involved in establishing the Socialist Labour League (SLL), becoming one of its full-time organisers in Glasgow for three years. He left the SLL in 1964, but was only re-admitted to the Norwood Constituency Labour Party in 1970.

== Lambeth Council ==
As a member of Norwood Labour Party, Knight met Ken Livingstone – later Leader of the Greater London Council and Mayor of London – and the two formed an alliance to influence the selection of candidates in Norwood for the council elections in 1974. After that, they jostled for the leadership of the left within the Labour Group on Lambeth London Borough Council but Livingstone's later move to Camden in North London left the way open for Knight to become the leading left-winger within the Labour Group and Leader of the Council.

Once positioned as leader, Knight moved the local party away from a class-based, workerist position and towards more radical cultural causes, embracing the struggles of minority groups as well as the sociological concerns of the New Left. This made him unusual amongst pre-1968 figures on the Labour left, as did his emphasis on combatting Thatcherite authoritarian populism 'from below' by spearheading municipally-led grassroots initiatives rather than by advocating a centralised, Bennite command-and-control economy.

When the Conservative Government took powers through the Rates Act 1984 to limit the budgets of local councils, several left-wing Labour councils organised a rate-capping rebellion in which they refused to set a budget. All the councils eventually backed down except Liverpool City Council and Lambeth. The district auditor found that the council had lost interest on tax payments as a result, which was held to be due to the "wilful misconduct" of Knight and 31 other councillors. Each was required to repay the amount of lost interest in a surcharge and banned from holding office for five years from 1986. The Labour Party's leader, Neil Kinnock, blamed local leaders like Knight and Linda Bellos from Lambeth, for bringing the Labour Party into disrepute.

Knight was the Labour candidate for the marginal Hornsey constituency in the 1979 general election but lost. He stood unsuccessfully in 1981 Greater London Council election for Norwood. Prior to the 1987 general election, Knight was a potential candidate for Coventry North East: a runner-up at the Constituency Labour Party selection meeting, he lost out to John Hughes.

== After Lambeth ==
Knight took a break from politics after being expelled from office as a result of the rate-capping rebellion. He pursued various business interests, including managing a restaurant in Clapham, and remained treasurer of the town hall social club until it closed in 1994. He remained active within his union, Unite.

Knight was elected to the National Committee of the Labour Representation Committee at their AGM on 17 November 2007.

After the election of Jeremy Corbyn as leader of the Labour Party, Knight again became active in Lambeth Labour, securing the post of ward chair in Gipsy Hill ward in November 2016.

Knight died in March 2020.
