= Stephen Haseler =

British politician (1942–2017)

Stephen Michael Alan Haseler (9 January 1942 – 20 July 2017) was a British academic and advocate for a British republic. He was a Professor of Government, author of many books on contemporary politics and economics.

== Personal life and education ==
Born in Colchester, Essex, Haseler attended Westcliff High School for Boys, Southend, and then University College London and the London School of Economics (LSE). He was awarded a BSc(Econ.) in 1963 and a PhD in 1967 for his thesis on Revisionism in the British Labour Party during the post-war period. Haseler married (Roberta) Bay Haseler from New York City in 1967, and they lived together in London and Washington, D.C.

== Political involvement ==
Haseler had a long record of political involvement in Britain, having stood for election to the House of Commons for the Labour Party in Saffron Walden at the 1966 general election, coming second to Peter Kirk while also being the youngest candidate in the country, and in the 1970 general election for the Maldon constituency, coming second to Brian Harrison. He was elected to the Greater London Council for the Wood Green division in 1973, where he was appointed chairman of the General Purposes Committee.

In June 1975 he became a founder and joint secretary of the Social Democratic Alliance (SDA), a grassroots organisation established on the right of the party to combat "entryism" by extra-parliamentary Marxist and Trotskyist organisations, such as Militant and the International Socialists. Although the new group was supported by the Cabinet minister Reg Prentice, who declared that he would speak in its support on "any platform", the decision to criticise mainstream Labour politicians and trade unionists – including Michael Foot and the railwaymen's leader Sid Weighell – for writing opinion pieces in Communist-backed newspapers did not go down well. Harold Wilson, in his last Labour Party Conference speech as Prime Minister, attacked the SDA as an "anti-party group which has been disporting itself in Blackpool this weekend, leaking… their smears to an ever-ready Tory press."

Haseler was expelled from the Labour Party in 1980, after the NEC decided by a majority of 23 to 2 that membership of the group was incompatible with party values. He went on to become a founder member of the Social Democratic Party (SDP) the following year, and in 1982 stood to become the party's president, but took last place with 14.8% of the vote. He later became co-chair of the Radical Society (1988–96) and Chair of the pressure group Republic (1990–2004) and honorary chair from 2004 to 2007. He was on the Pro-Euro Conservative Party list for the London constituency in the 1999 European Parliament elections.

Although initially an opponent of Britain's membership of the European Economic Community (as it was then), he later became a staunch European federalist who believed that the only credible future for the UK was in the European Union, and that the only viable future for the peoples of Europe lay in a United States of Europe.

== Academic interests ==
His specialisms were British politics, the UK Constitution, transatlantic relations and European defence. However, following the publication of his book The Super-Rich (Macmillan 2001), he wrote and lectured on the 2008 financial crisis and Global Politics and rising economic inequality. Haseler was also an authority on the monarchy of the United Kingdom and as an advocate of radical constitutional change, including a written constitution and a republican form of government. He regularly appeared on national television and radio in the UK and wrote for national newspapers on these subjects. He served on the board of The American International University in London, and was a senior fellow at the Federal Trust.

Formerly the director of The Global Policy Institute based at London Metropolitan University, he held visiting professorships at Georgetown University, Johns Hopkins University, George Mason University and the University of Maryland-Baltimore County. He was an emeritus professor at London Metropolitan University.

== Publications ==
Haseler published extensively, including The Gaitskellites (Macmillan, 1969), The Death of British Democracy (Elek, 1976), The Tragedy of Labour (Blackwells, Oxford, 1981), The Battle for Britain: Thatcher and the New Liberals (I.B. Tauris, 1989), The End of the House of Windsor (I.B. Tauris, 1993), The English Tribe: Identity, Nation and the New Europe (Macmillan, 1996), The Super-Rich: The Unjust World of Global Capital (Macmillan, 2001), Super-State: The New Europe and the Challenge to America (I.B. Tauris, 2004), Sidekick: British Global Strategy from Churchill to Blair (Forum Press, 2006, Meltdown: How the Masters of the Universe Destroyed the West's Power and Prosperity (Forum Press, 2008) and Meltdown UK (Forum Press, 2010). His book Grand Delusion: Britain in the Age of Elizabeth II (IB Tauris, 2012), was written to coincide with the Diamond Jubilee of Queen Elizabeth II.
