= Lambeth (electoral division) =

Electoral division in Greater London, 1965–1973

- Former electoral division for the Greater London Council
- Lambeth electoral division boundaries
- District: London Borough of Lambeth
- Population: 325,070 (1969 estimate)
- Electorate: 227,546 (1964); 218,745 (1967); 216,642 (1970)
- Area: 6,738.2 acres (27.269 km^{2})

Former electoral division
- Created: 1965
- Abolished: 1973
- Member: 4
- Replaced by: Lambeth Central, Norwood, Streatham and Vauxhall

Lambeth was an electoral division for the purposes of elections to the Greater London Council. The constituency elected four councillors for a three-year term in 1964, 1967 and 1970.

== History ==
It was planned to use the same boundaries as the Westminster Parliament constituencies for election of councillors to the Greater London Council (GLC), as had been the practice for elections to the predecessor London County Council, but those that existed in 1965 crossed the Greater London boundary. Until new constituencies could be settled, the 32 London boroughs were used as electoral areas which therefore created a constituency called Lambeth.

The electoral division was replaced from 1973 by the single-member electoral divisions of Lambeth Central, Norwood, Streatham and Vauxhall.

== Elections ==
The Lambeth constituency was used for the Greater London Council elections in 1964, 1967 and 1970. Four councillors were elected at each election using first-past-the-post voting.

=== 1964 election ===
The first election was held on 9 April 1964, a year before the council came into its powers. The electorate was 227,546 and four Labour Party councillors were elected. With 91,952 people voting, the turnout was 40.4%. The councillors were elected for a three-year term.

1964 Greater London Council election: Lambeth
Party	Candidate	Votes	%	±%
Labour	Robert William George Humphreys	46,240		
Labour	Victor Mishcon	46,056		
Labour	Beatrice Serota	45,492		
Labour	Sidney Aubrey Melman	45,125		
Conservative	L. Iremonger	37,812		
Conservative	Gerard Folliott Vaughan	37,358		
Conservative	A. M. Tennant	37,122		
Conservative	I. N. Samuel	37,057		
Liberal	D. R. Chapman	4,860		
Liberal	W. B. Mattinson	4,606		
Liberal	J.H. Gardner	4,451		
Liberal	I. Shaw	4,116		
Communist	J. Lawrence	2,416		
Communist	T. Gorringe	2,052		
Independent	William George Boaks	1,282		
Independent	A. C. Osman	1,103		
Turnout				
Labour win (new seat)				
Labour win (new seat)				
Labour win (new seat)				
Labour win (new seat)				

=== 1967 election ===
The second election was held on 13 April 1967. The electorate was 218,745 and four Conservative Party councillors were elected. With 84,141 people voting, the turnout was 38.5%. The councillors were elected for a three-year term.

1967 Greater London Council election: Lambeth
Party	Candidate	Votes	%	±%
Conservative	Muriel Gumbel	45,371		
Conservative	William Wycliffe Livingston	45,140		
Conservative	Gerard Folliott Vaughan	44,912		
Conservative	Geoffrey Edwin Pattie	44,438		
Labour	Robert William George Humphreys	32,332		
Labour	Victor Mishcon	31,706		
Labour	Sidney Aubrey Melman	31,220		
Labour	Beatrice Serota	31,079		
Liberal	C. W. E. Dudley	4,428		
Liberal	E. Hawthorne	4,267		
Liberal	A. C. Monteath	3,580		
Liberal	A. P. Wagman	3,457		
Communist	S. G. Hope	1,620		
Socialist (GB)	J. A. Garnham	1,362		
Communist	J. E. Styles	1,361		
Socialist (GB)	H. Baldwin	1,202		
Socialist (GB)	V. W. Phillips	970		
Socialist (GB)	M. E. Sansum	806		
Turnout				
Conservative gain from Labour		Swing		
Conservative gain from Labour		Swing		
Conservative gain from Labour		Swing		
Conservative gain from Labour		Swing		

=== 1970 election ===
The third election was held on 9 April 1970. The electorate was 216,642. One Labour Party and three Conservative Party councillors were elected. With 72,702 people voting, the turnout was 33.5%. The councillors were elected for a three-year term.

1970 Greater London Council election: Lambeth
Party	Candidate	Votes	%	±%
Conservative	Diana Elizabeth Geddes	34,111		
Labour	Anna Lloyd Grieves	33,936		
Conservative	Malby Sturges Crofton	33,918		
Conservative	William Wycliffe Livingston	33,868		
Conservative	Muriel Gumbel	33,774		
Labour	D. A. N. Jones	33,738		
Labour	D. P. Chesworth	33,645		
Labour	T. Ponsonby	33,045		
Liberal	D. E. Delaney	1,952		
Liberal	S. J. Beaven	1,847		
Liberal	E. D. Larkin	1,784		
Liberal	T. J. Barker	1,781		
Homes before Roads	P. Grier	1,186		
Homes before Roads	J. L. Keelan	1,100		
Homes before Roads	A. J. Luckett	1,004		
Homes before Roads	R. W. Thomas	956		
Communist	S. G. Hope	888		
Communist	J. E. Styles	745		
Socialist (GB)	J. A. Garnham	620		
Socialist (GB)	V. W. Phillips	620		
Independent	William George Boaks	366		
Socialist (GB)	M. E. Sansum	337		
Socialist (GB)	F. W. Simkins	295		
Union Movement	J. Archer	293		
Turnout				
Conservative hold		Swing		
Labour gain from Conservative		Swing		
Conservative hold		Swing		
Conservative hold		Swing		
