= Mike Tuffrey =

British Liberal Democrat politician

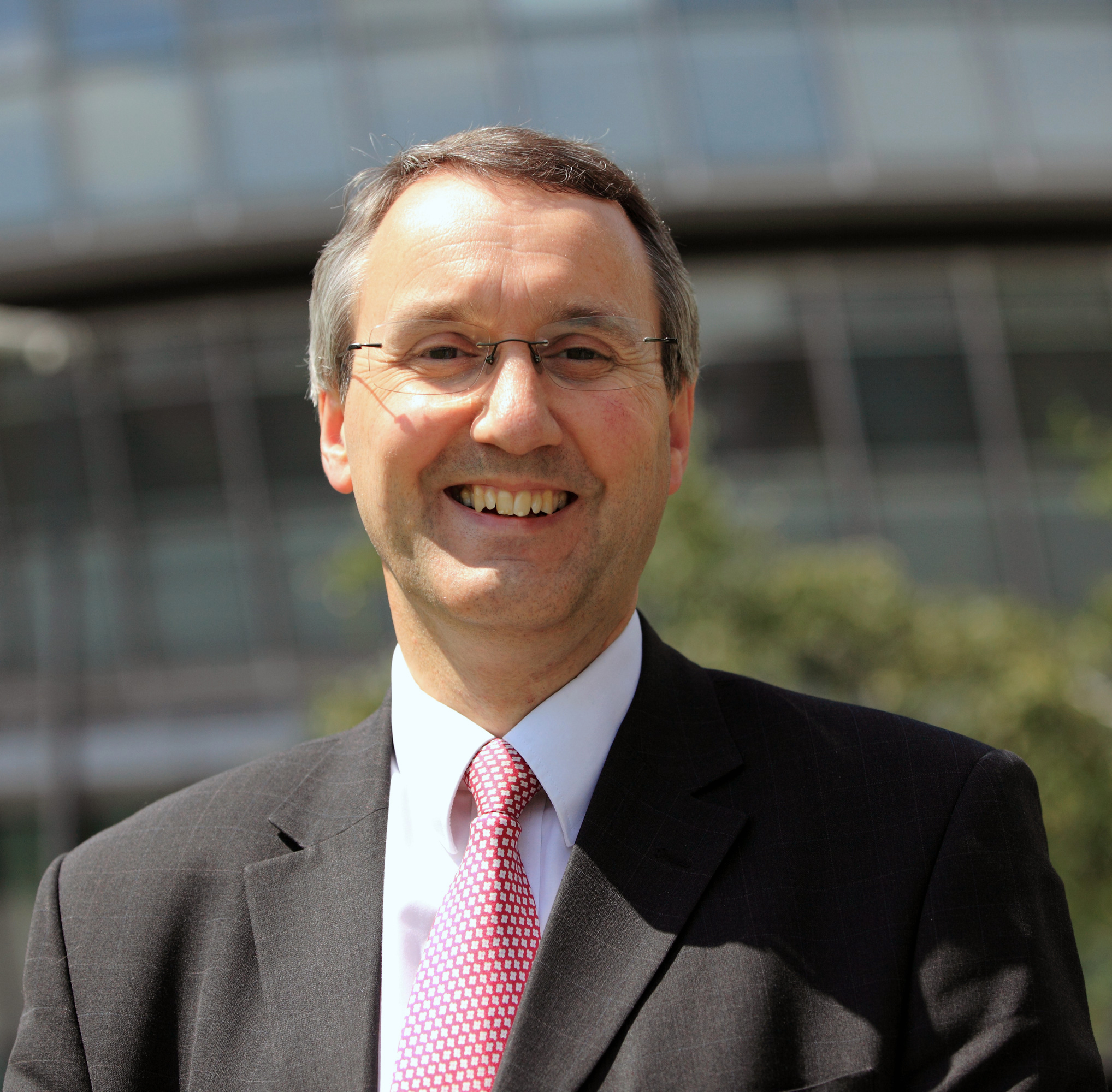
- Tuffrey in 2011

Member of the London Assembly as an additional member
- In office 18 February 2002 – 3 May 2012
- Preceded by: Louise Bloom
- Succeeded by: Stephen Knight

Member of Greater London Council for Vauxhall
- In office 1985–1986

Member of Lambeth London Borough Council
- In office 1990–2002

Personal details
- Born: 30 September 1959 (age 67) Orpington, England
- Party: Liberal Democrats

Michael William Tuffrey is a British businessman and former Liberal Democrat politician who served as a member of the London Assembly (AM) from 2002 to 2012. He took his seat on 18 February 2002 replacing Louise Bloom who had resigned. He was re-elected in 2004 and 2008 leading the Liberal Democrat group and chairing various London Assembly committees.

== Early life and education ==
Tuffrey was born in Orpington and grew up in Bromley. He was educated at Douai School, an independent Catholic school in Woolhampton. He then studied economics at Durham University. (1978–81) He moved to Brixton when he got his first job as a trainee accountant at Peat Marwick, later KPMG.

== Political career ==
He started his political life as a member of the Greater London Council for Vauxhall (1985-6) and was a councillor of the London Borough of Lambeth from 1990 to 2002 during the second half of which period the council had no overall political control and the Liberal Democrats were the largest single party. During this time he represented Lambeth at London Councils and served as a board member of London Development Partnership, Business Link London, Brixton City Challenge, Cross River Partnership and Central London Partnership.

He stood for election to parliament for Streatham in 1987, in the 1989 Vauxhall by-election and again in Vauxhall in the 1992 General Election.

== London Assembly ==
Michael Tuffrey was a member of the London Assembly from 2002 to 2012 and led the Liberal Democrat group from May 2006 until May 2012 [7]. He was a member of the Assembly's Environment, Planning and Housing, and Budget and Performance Management Committees.

He was also a member of the London Fire and Emergency Planning Authority, first appointed in 2002 and serving as leader of the Liberal Democrat Group 2006 to 2008. Tuffrey was appointed to the London Sustainable Development Commission in 2004 by Ken Livingstone and reappointed by Boris Johnson for a second term in 2008

== London Mayoral campaign ==
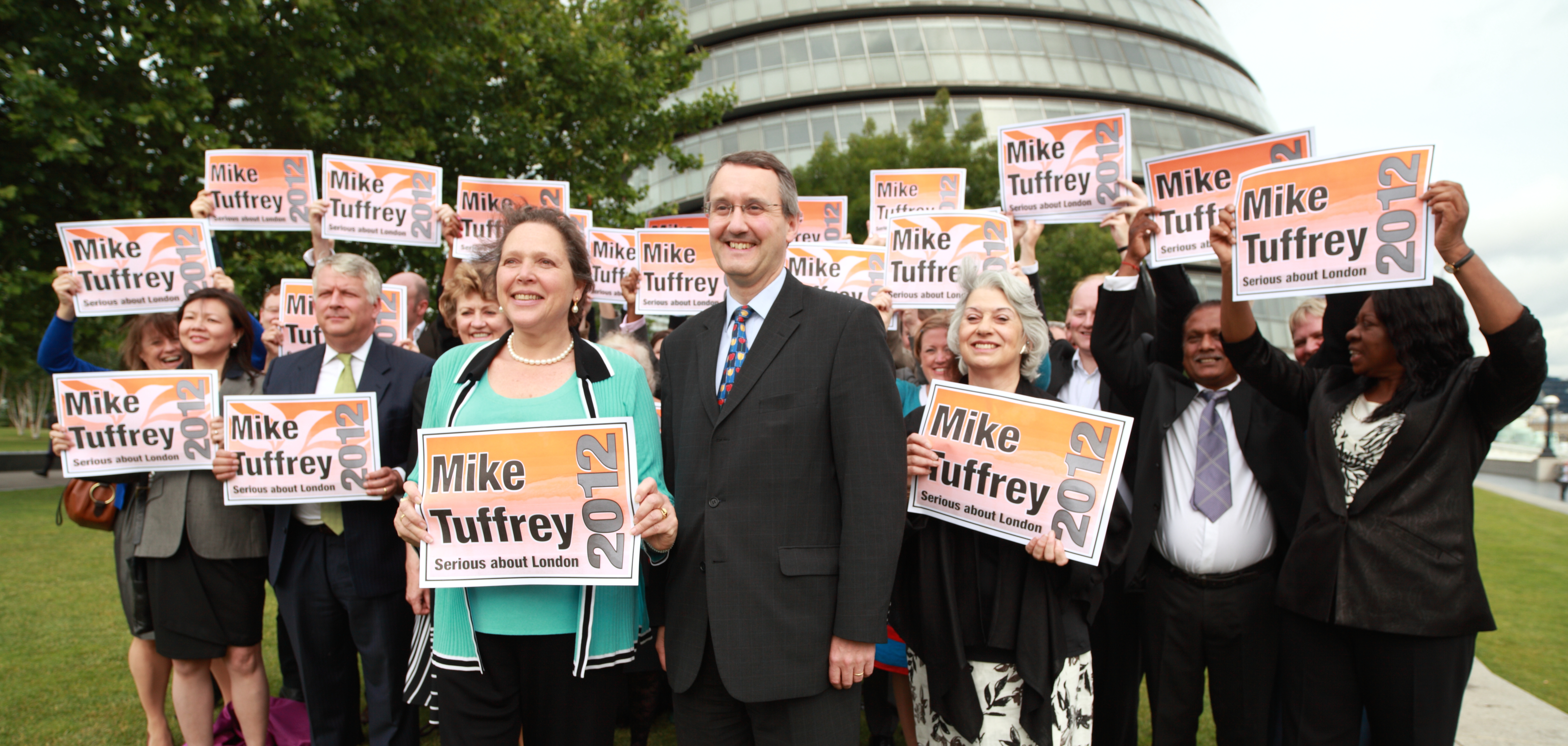
Mike Tuffrey launches his campaign to become London Mayor with Susan Kramer and his team of London Liberal Democrats campaigners at City Hall

After setting out a plan for London Tuffrey launched his bid to become the Liberal Democrat candidate for Mayor of London in the 2012 election. Running against Lembit Öpik, Tuffrey was "widely tipped to become the Liberal Democrats' candidate". He emerged after nominations were reopened as the "anyone-but-Lembit" candidate, with Öpik's detractors claiming that he 'lacked gravitas' . However, in the event Tuffrey was narrowly beaten by former Metropolitan Police officer Brian Paddick.

== Professional career ==
Tuffrey is a qualified Chartered Accountant, and has worked as a finance director for a major national charity before starting up a consultancy business, Corporate Citizenship. In 2021 the business was acquired by SLR, an environmental consulting firm. He is also a non-executive director, and chairs the boards of the London Film Academy and the Restart Project. He has contributed to the Guardian on business matters.

== Personal life ==
Tuffrey has lived in Lambeth since 1982 and is married to Irene Tuffrey-Wijne, Professor of Intellectual Disability and Palliative Care.

== Bibliography ==
- Who's Who 2008, (A. & C. Black, 2007)
