= Manor (Barking and Dagenham ward) =

Electoral ward in London, England

- Former electoral ward for the Barking and Dagenham London Borough Council
- Borough: Barking and Dagenham
- County: Greater London

Former electoral ward
- Created: 1965
- Abolished: 2002

Manor was an electoral ward in the London Borough of Barking and Dagenham from 1965 to 2002.

== 1978–2002 Barking and Dagenham council elections ==
There was a revision of ward boundaries in Barking in 1978. The name of the borough and council changed from Barking to Barking and Dagenham on 1 January 1980.

=== 1998 election ===
The election took place on 7 May 1998.

1998 Barking and Dagenham London Borough Council election: Manor
Party	Candidate	Votes	%	±%
Labour	June Conyard	803	77.5	−3.2
Labour	Rita Hannah-Rogers	753		
Liberal Democrats	David Boorman	233	22.5	+3.2
Turnout		1,080	22.9	−15.4
Registered electors		4,710		
Labour hold		Swing		
Labour hold		Swing		

=== 1995 by-election ===
The by-election took place on 9 November 1995, following the resignation of Alastair Hannah-Rogers.

1995 Manor by-election
Party	Candidate	Votes	%	±%
Labour	June Conyard	657	86.7	+6.0
Liberal Democrats	David Oram	101	13.3	−6.0
Majority		556	73.4	N/A
Turnout			16.6	−21.7
Registered electors				
Labour hold		Swing		

=== 1994 election ===
The election took place on 5 May 1994.

=== 1990 election ===
The election took place on 3 May 1990.

=== 1986 election ===
The election took place on 8 May 1986.

=== 1982 by-election ===
The by-election took place on 15 July 1982, following the death of Albert Ball.

1982 Manor by-election
Party	Candidate	Votes	%	±%
Labour	Brian Walker	625	60.6	−6.6
Conservative	Leonard Nelson	205	19.9	−8.4
Alliance	David Kingaby	202	19.6	+19.6
Majority		420	40.7	N/A
Turnout			21.1	−12.2
Registered electors		4,930		
Labour hold		Swing		

=== 1982 election ===
The election took place on 6 May 1982.

=== 1978 election ===
The election took place on 4 May 1978.

1978 Barking London Borough Council election: Manor
Party	Candidate	Votes	%	±%
Labour	Albert Ball	1,118	63.8	+17.0
Labour	James Mannering	1,043		N/A
Conservative	Bernadette Long	462	26.4	+7.2
Liberal	Muriel Stolton	172	9.8	N/A
Turnout			34.1	+26.6
Registered electors		4,957		
Labour hold		Swing		
Labour hold		Swing		

== 1964–1978 Barking council elections ==
=== 1974 election ===
The election took place on 2 May 1974.

1974 Barking London Borough Council election: Manor
Party	Candidate	Votes	%	±%
Labour	Maud Ball	796	80.8	−6.6
Labour	Eric Mansell	648		N/A
Labour	M Arnold	623		N/A
Labour	M Preston	519		N/A
Conservative	R Pool	189	19.2	+6.6
Turnout			7.5	−21.0
Registered electors		9,230		
Labour hold		Swing		
Labour hold		Swing		
Labour hold		Swing		
Labour hold		Swing		

=== 1971 election ===
The election took place on 13 May 1971.

1971 Barking London Borough Council election: Manor
Party	Candidate	Votes	%	±%
Labour	Maud Ball	2,747	87.4	+10.8
Labour	L Blake	2,656		N/A
Labour	Eric Mansell	2,656		N/A
Labour	Millicent Preston	2,466		N/A
Conservative	B Long	396	12.6	−10.8
Turnout			28.5	+6.1
Registered electors		9,573		
Labour hold		Swing		
Labour hold		Swing		
Labour hold		Swing		
Labour hold		Swing		

=== 1968 election ===
The election took place on 9 May 1968.

1968 Barking London Borough Council election: Manor
Party	Candidate	Votes	%	±%
Labour	Maud Ball	1,600	76.6	−9.5
Labour	Gilbert Beane	1,551		N/A
Labour	Millicent Preston	1,509		N/A
Labour	L Blake	1,505		N/A
Conservative	A Beasley	489	23.4	+9.5
Conservative	I Fuller	401		N/A
Conservative	J Eden	399		N/A
Conservative	F Tisdell	392		N/A
Turnout			22.4	−0.8
Registered electors		9,231		
Labour hold		Swing		
Labour hold		Swing		
Labour hold		Swing		
Labour hold		Swing		

=== 1964 election ===
The election took place on 7 May 1964.

1964 Barking London Borough Council election: Manor
Party	Candidate	Votes	%	±%
Labour	Albert Ball	1,893	86.1	N/A
Labour	Maud Ball	1,888		N/A
Labour	G Beane	1,748		N/A
Labour	M Preston	1,678		N/A
Conservative	J Broadbridge	305	13.9	N/A
Turnout		2,221	23.2	N/A
Registered electors		9,582		
Labour win (new seat)				
Labour win (new seat)				
Labour win (new seat)				
Labour win (new seat)				
