= Sidcup (disambiguation) =

Sidcup is an area of south-east London, England.

Sidcup may also refer to:

- Sidcup (electoral division), former Greater London Council electoral division
- Sidcup (UK Parliament constituency), former constituency centred on the London area
- Sidcup (ward), Bexley London Borough Council ward
- Sidcup, Alberta, Canada
