= Hayes and Harlington =

Hayes and Harlington may refer to:

- Hayes and Harlington Urban District, in west Middlesex, England, from 1930 to 1965
- Hayes and Harlington (UK Parliament constituency), a constituency in Greater London in the House of Commons of the UK Parliament
- Hayes and Harlington (electoral division), Greater London Council
- Hayes & Harlington railway station, a railway station in Hayes and Harlington in the London Borough of Hillingdon
