= Lewisham East =

Lewisham East could refer to:

- Lewisham East (UK Parliament constituency)
- Lewisham East (electoral division), Greater London Council
- Lewisham East (London County Council constituency)
