= Ruislip-Northwood =

Ruislip-Northwood may refer to:

- Ruislip-Northwood Urban District
- Ruislip-Northwood (UK Parliament constituency)
- Ruislip-Northwood (electoral division), Greater London Council
