= Bexleyheath (disambiguation) =

Bexleyheath is a town in southeast London, England.

Bexleyheath may also refer to:

- Bexleyheath (constituency), former UK Parliament constituency
- Bexleyheath (electoral division), former Greater London Council electoral division
- Bexleyheath (ward), Bexley London Borough Council electoral ward
