= Brent South (electoral division) =

Electoral division in Greater London, 1973–1986

- Former electoral division for the Greater London Council
- Brent South electoral division boundaries
- District: Brent
- Electorate: 61,915 (1973); 59,158 (1977); 59,140 (1981)
- Area: 1,319 hectares (13.19 km^{2})

Former electoral division
- Created: 1973
- Abolished: 1986
- Member: 1
- Created from: Brent

Brent South was an electoral division for the purposes of elections to the Greater London Council. The constituency elected one councillor for a four-year term in 1973, 1977 and 1981, with the final term extended for an extra year ahead of the abolition of the Greater London Council.

== History ==
It was planned to use the same boundaries as the Westminster Parliament constituencies for election of councillors to the Greater London Council (GLC), as had been the practice for elections to the predecessor London County Council, but those that existed in 1965 crossed the Greater London boundary. Until new constituencies could be settled, the 32 London boroughs were used as electoral areas. The London Borough of Brent formed the Brent electoral division. This was used for the Greater London Council elections in 1964, 1967 and 1970.

The new constituencies were settled following the Second Periodic Review of Westminster constituencies and the new electoral division matched the boundaries of the Brent South parliamentary constituency.

It covered an area of 1,319 hectares (13.19 km^{2}).

== Elections ==
The Brent South constituency was used for the Greater London Council elections in 1973, 1977 and 1981. One councillor was elected at each election using first-past-the-post voting.

=== 1973 election ===
The fourth election to the GLC (and first using revised boundaries) was held on 12 April 1973. The electorate was 61,915 and one Labour Party councillor was elected. The turnout was 34.4%. The councillor was elected for a three-year term. This was extended for an extra year in 1976 when the electoral cycle was switched to four-yearly.

1973 Greater London Council election: Brent South
Party	Candidate	Votes	%	±%
Labour	Illtyd Harrington	14,190	66.57	
Conservative	R. G. N. Taylor	6,635	31.11	
Communist	L. G. Burt	503	2.36	
Turnout				
Labour win (new seat)				

=== 1977 election ===
The fifth election to the GLC (and second using revised boundaries) was held on 5 May 1977. The electorate was 59,158 and one Labour Party councillor was elected. The turnout was 38.9%. The councillor was elected for a four-year term.

1977 Greater London Council election: Brent South
Party	Candidate	Votes	%	±%
Labour	Illtyd Harrington	10,893	47.31	
Conservative	R. W. S. Allason	9,027	39.20	
National Front	G. W. Bryant	1,461	6.34	
Liberal	J. H. Gover	941	4.09	
Communist	L. G. Burt	410	1.78	
Independent	I. Gottlieb	290	1.26	
Turnout				
Labour hold		Swing		

=== 1981 election ===
The sixth and final election to the GLC (and third using revised boundaries) was held on 7 May 1981. The electorate was 59,140 and one Labour Party councillor was elected. The turnout was 42.4%. The councillor was elected for a four-year term, extended by an extra year by the Local Government (Interim Provisions) Act 1984, ahead of the abolition of the council.

1981 Greater London Council election: Brent South
Party	Candidate	Votes	%	±%
Labour	Illtyd Harrington	16,827	67.11	
Conservative	Sujan S. Raizada	4,365	17.41	
Liberal	John H. Gover	3,316	13.23	
Workers Revolutionary	Robert P. Myers	399	1.59	
Constitutional Movement	Roger Tainton	165	0.66	
Turnout				
Labour hold		Swing		
