= Acton (electoral division) =

Electoral division in Greater London, 1973–1986

- Former electoral division for the Greater London Council
- Acton electoral division boundaries
- District: Ealing
- Electorate: 56,841 (1973); 58,633 (1977); 51,903 (1981)
- Major settlements: Acton
- Area: 1,450 hectares (14.5 km^{2})

Former electoral division
- Created: 1973
- Abolished: 1986
- Member: 1
- Created from: Ealing

Acton was an electoral division for the purposes of elections to the Greater London Council. The constituency elected one councillor for a four-year term in 1973, 1977 and 1981, with the final term extended for an extra year ahead of the abolition of the Greater London Council.

== History ==
It was planned to use the same boundaries as the Westminster Parliament constituencies for election of councillors to the Greater London Council (GLC), as had been the practice for elections to the predecessor London County Council, but those that existed in 1965 crossed the Greater London boundary. Until new constituencies could be settled, the 32 London boroughs were used as electoral areas. The London Borough of Ealing formed the Ealing electoral division. This was used for the Greater London Council elections in 1964, 1967 and 1970.

The new constituencies were settled following the Second Periodic Review of Westminster constituencies and the new electoral division matched the boundaries of the Acton parliamentary constituency.

It covered an area of 1,450 hectares (14.5 km^{2}).

== Elections ==
The Acton constituency was used for the Greater London Council elections in 1973, 1977 and 1981. One councillor was elected at each election using first-past-the-post voting.

=== 1973 election ===
The fourth election to the GLC (and first using revised boundaries) was held on 12 April 1973. The electorate was 56,841 and one Conservative Party councillor was elected. The turnout was 40.7%. The councillor was elected for a three-year term. This was extended for an extra year in 1976 when the electoral cycle was switched to four-yearly.

1973 Greater London Council election: Acton
Party	Candidate	Votes	%	±%
Conservative	John Chaytor Dobson	10,576	45.67	
Labour	O. P. Stutchbury	9,665	41.72	
Liberal	N. J. Reed	2,616	11.30	
Communist	H. A. Tank	303	1.31	
Turnout				
Conservative win (new seat)				

=== 1977 election ===
The fifth election to the GLC (and second using revised boundaries) was held on 5 May 1977. The electorate was 58,633 and one Conservative Party councillor was elected. The turnout was 46.2%. The councillor was elected for a four-year term.

1977 Greater London Council election: Acton
Party	Candidate	Votes	%	±%
Conservative	John Chaytor Dobson	16.005	59.24	
Labour	P. C. Eckles	8,276	30.63	
Liberal	S. J. Rowley	1,438	5.32	
National Front	C. B. Wakley	896	3.32	
Communist	M. Mitchell	295	1.09	
Independent	K. S. Blakebrough	119	0.44	
Turnout				
Conservative hold		Swing		

=== 1981 election ===
The sixth and final election to the GLC (and third using revised boundaries) was held on 7 May 1981. The electorate was 51,903 and one Labour Party councillor was elected. The turnout was 51.6%. The councillor was elected for a four-year term, extended by an extra year by the Local Government (Interim Provisions) Act 1984, ahead of the abolition of the council.

1981 Greater London Council election: Acton
Party	Candidate	Votes	%	±%
Conservative	John Chaytor Dobson	12,599	47.23	
Labour	Jennifer Fletcher	10,208	38.25	
Liberal	Simon K. Rowley	2,918	10.94	
Ecology	Paul Gorka	310	1.16	
Independent	James O'Leary	214	0.80	
Save London Action Group	Helen N. Elliott	182	0.68	
Communist	Jerome C. Spring	139	0.52	
Workers Revolutionary	Martin Larkin	118	0.44	
Turnout				
Conservative hold		Swing		
