= Harrow (electoral division) =

Electoral division in Greater London, 1965–1973

- Former electoral division for the Greater London Council
- Harrow electoral division boundaries
- District: London Borough of Harrow
- Population: 207,700 (1969 estimate)
- Electorate: 145,864 (1964); 146,937 (1966); 143,881 (1967); 153,192 (1970)
- Area: 12,555.4 acres (50.810 km^{2})

Former electoral division
- Created: 1965
- Abolished: 1973
- Member(s): 3
- Replaced by: Harrow Central, Harrow East and Harrow West.

Harrow was an electoral division for the purposes of elections to the Greater London Council. The constituency elected three councillors for a three-year term in 1964, 1967 and 1970.

== History ==
It was planned to use the same boundaries as the Westminster Parliament constituencies for election of councillors to the Greater London Council (GLC), as had been the practice for elections to the predecessor London County Council, but those that existed in 1965 crossed the Greater London boundary. Until new constituencies could be settled, the 32 London boroughs were used as electoral areas which therefore created a constituency called Harrow.

The electoral division was replaced from 1973 by the single-member electoral divisions of Harrow Central, Harrow East and Harrow West.

== Elections ==
The Harrow constituency was used for the Greater London Council elections in 1964, 1967 and 1970. Three councillors were elected at each election using first-past-the-post voting. Horace Cutler, who was successful at all three elections was later elected to represent Harrow West in 1973, 1977 and 1981. He was Leader of the Greater London Council from 1973 to 1977.

=== 1964 election ===
The first election was held on 9 April 1964, a year before the council came into its powers. The electorate was 145,864 and three Conservative Party councillors were elected. With 80,742 people voting, the turnout was 55.4%. The councillors were elected for a three-year term.

1964 Greater London Council election: Harrow
Party	Candidate	Votes	%	±%
Conservative	Horace Walter Cutler	37,895		
Conservative	Oliver John Galley	37,021		
Conservative	William Emlyn Jones	35,577		
Labour	A. J. Lovell	27,000		
Labour	T. T. Swan	25,995		
Labour	A. R. Judge	24,684		
Liberal	M. D. Colne	14,447		
Liberal	D. F. Joyner	13,333		
Liberal	C. M. Hawkings	13,151		
Communist	R. A. Ward	3,426		
Turnout				
Conservative win (new seat)				
Conservative win (new seat)				
Conservative win (new seat)				

=== 1966 by-election ===
A by-election was held on 27 January 1966, following the death of Oliver John Galley. The electorate was 146,937 and one Conservative Party councillor was elected. With 16,632 voting, the turnout was 14.9%

Harrow by-election, 1966
Party	Candidate	Votes	%	±%
Conservative	Harold Trevor Mote	18,490		
Communist	R.A. Ward	1,858		
Union Movement	R.C. Ramage	1,539		
Turnout				
Conservative hold		Swing		

=== 1967 election ===
The second election was held on 13 April 1967. The electorate was 143,881 and three Conservative Party councillors were elected. With 83,534 people voting, the turnout was 47.5%. The councillors were elected for a three-year term.

1967 Greater London Council election: Harrow
Party	Candidate	Votes	%	±%
Conservative	Horace Walter Cutler	39,791		
Conservative	William Emlyn Jones	39,405		
Conservative	Harold Trevor Mote	39,003		
Labour	A. R. Judge	18,106		
Labour	A. J. Lovell	17,066		
Labour	A. H. Tidmarsh	16,447		
Liberal	W. R. Westaway	8,026		
Liberal	M. E. Wakefield	7,247		
Liberal	A. J. Wilson	7,074		
Communist	R. A. Ward	3,778		
Union Movement	R. C. Ramage	1,512		
Turnout				
Conservative hold		Swing		
Conservative hold		Swing		
Conservative hold		Swing		

=== 1970 election ===
The third election was held on 9 April 1970. The electorate was 153,192 and three Conservative Party councillors were elected. With 60,074 people voting, the turnout was 39.2%. The councillors were elected for a three-year term.

1970 Greater London Council election: Harrow
Party	Candidate	Votes	%	±%
Conservative	William Sydney Clack	37,370		
Conservative	Horace Walter Cutler	37,113		
Conservative	Harold Trevor Mote	36,867		
Labour	A. J. Lovell	16,449		
Labour	A. S. How	15,867		
Labour	J. P. Brophy	15,079		
Liberal	K. Higgins	4,985		
Liberal	A. H. J. Miller	4,530		
Liberal	J. F. Smith	4,491		
Homes before Roads	J. W. Jones	964		
Communist	R. A. Ward	851		
Homes before Roads	M. C. Mayer	652		
Homes before Roads	C. McSherry	508		
Union Movement	R. C. Ramage	478		
Turnout				
Conservative hold		Swing		
Conservative hold		Swing		
Conservative hold		Swing		
