= Bexley (electoral division) =

Electoral division in Greater London, 1965–1973

- Former electoral division for the Greater London Council
- Bexley electoral division boundaries
- District: London Borough of Bexley
- Population: 215,610 (1969 estimate)
- Electorate: 149,461 (1964); 149,025 (1967); 159,305 (1970)
- Area: 14,985.7 acres (60.645 km^{2})

Former electoral division
- Created: 1965
- Abolished: 1973
- Member(s): 3
- Replaced by: Bexleyheath, Erith and Crayford and Sidcup

Bexley was an electoral division for the purposes of elections to the Greater London Council. The constituency elected three councillors for a three-year term in 1964, 1967 and 1970.

== History ==
It was planned to use the same boundaries as the Westminster Parliament constituencies for election of councillors to the Greater London Council (GLC), as had been the practice for elections to the predecessor London County Council, but those that existed in 1965 crossed the Greater London boundary. Until new constituencies could be settled, the 32 London boroughs were used as electoral areas which therefore created a constituency called Bexley.

The electoral division was replaced from 1973 by the single-member electoral divisions of Bexleyheath, Erith and Crayford and Sidcup.

== Elections ==
The Bexley constituency was used for the Greater London Council elections in 1964, 1967 and 1970. Three councillors were elected at each election using first-past-the-post voting.

=== 1964 election ===
The first election was held on 9 April 1964, a year before the council came into its powers. The electorate was 149,461 and three Labour Party councillors were elected. With 83,062 people voting, the turnout was 55.6%. The councillors were elected for a three-year term.

1964 Greater London Council election: Bexley
| Party | Candidate | Votes | % | ±% |
|---|---|---|---|---|
| Labour | Edwin Furness | 41,300 | | |
| Labour | John Nicoll Powrie | 39,079 | | |
| Labour | Robin Beauchamp Thompson | 37,314 | | |
| Conservative | Douglas Melville Fielding | 33,958 | | |
| Conservative | A. F. Cobbold | 33,906 | | |
| Conservative | R. J. F. Monk | 31,939 | | |
| Liberal | R. J. Marsh | 7,435 | | |
| Liberal | R. H. A. Saunders | 6,770 | | |
| Liberal | C. E. Wright | 5,991 | | |
| Communist | L. H. Smith | 2,929 | | |
| Turnout | | | | |
| Labour win (new seat) | | | | |
| Labour win (new seat) | | | | |
| Labour win (new seat) | | | | |

=== 1967 election ===
The second election was held on 13 April 1967. The electorate was 149,025 and three Conservative Party councillors were elected. With 83,323 people voting, the turnout was 55.9%. The councillors were elected for a three-year term.

1967 Greater London Council election: Bexley
| Party | Candidate | Votes | % | ±% |
|---|---|---|---|---|
| Conservative | Douglas Melville Fielding | 45,792 | | |
| Conservative | Victor Rae Muske Langton | 45,052 | | |
| Conservative | John Mason | 45,036 | | |
| Labour | Edwin Furness | 31,087 | | |
| Labour | John Nicoll Powrie | 29,907 | | |
| Labour | Robin Beauchamp Thompson | 28,966 | | |
| Liberal | R. F. Lloyd | 4,781 | | |
| Liberal | S. Burraston | 4,296 | | |
| Liberal | L. W. Rogers | 4,217 | | |
| Independent | E. H. Taylor | 2,338 | | |
| Communist | W. E. Turner | 1,734 | | |
| Turnout | | | | |
| Conservative gain from Labour | | Swing | | |
| Conservative gain from Labour | | Swing | | |
| Conservative gain from Labour | | Swing | | |

=== 1970 election ===
The third election was held on 9 April 1970. The electorate was 159,305 and three Conservative Party councillors were elected. With 69,707 people voting, the turnout was 43.8%. The councillors were elected for a three-year term.

1970 Greater London Council election: Bexley
| Party | Candidate | Votes | % | ±% |
|---|---|---|---|---|
| Conservative | Douglas Melville Fielding | 38,956 | | |
| Conservative | Victor Rae Muske Langton | 38,764 | | |
| Conservative | John Mason | 38,554 | | |
| Labour | C. F. Hargrave | 26,985 | | |
| Labour | S. W. Mayne | 26,186 | | |
| Labour | F. W. Styles | 25,968 | | |
| Liberal | S. Burraston | 2,738 | | |
| Liberal | W. A. King | 2,594 | | |
| Liberal | L. W. Rogers | 2,319 | | |
| Union Movement | M. I. Marsh | 673 | | |
| Communist | M. K. Bellsham-Revell | 624 | | |
| Homes before Roads | J. Lowe | 623 | | |
| Homes before Roads | A. D. Savil | 479 | | |
| Homes before Roads | V. R. Lowe | 455 | | |
| Turnout | | | | |
| Conservative hold | | Swing | | |
| Conservative hold | | Swing | | |
| Conservative hold | | Swing | | |
