= Constitutional Movement =

British right wing political group

- Leader: Andrew Fountaine
- Founded: 1979
- Dissolved: 1984
- Split from: National Front
- Merged into: British National Party
- Headquarters: Excalibur House, London
- Newspaper: Frontline News; Excalibur
- Ideology: British nationalism

The Constitutional Movement was a right wing political group in the United Kingdom. It was formed in 1979 by Andrew Fountaine as the National Front Constitutional Movement, a splinter group from the National Front. Offering a more moderate alternative to the NF, the Constitutional Movement claimed to have 2,000 members by 1980.

== Formation ==
Within the National Front in the late 1970s there was a growing disaffection with the leadership of John Tyndall and his associate Martin Webster and in particular their adherence to neo-Nazi principles rather than what the critics believed to be the vote-winning alternative of a more populist British nationalism. Already by 1978, Fountaine had become the focal point for a number of members of the anti-Tyndall faction and their position was strengthened by the 1979 general election in which the NF put forward the greatest number of candidates in its history but failed to make any headway with the electorate.

The party was born at a time of serious division in the British far right and competed with a number of other parties for attention. Such was the confusion at the time that party operations were even based at Excalibur House (London, EC2), which continued to be the HQ of the main NF. Fountaine had split from the NF in opposition to what he claimed was the increasing Nazism amongst the leadership, the encouragement of links with violent subcultures such as football hooliganism and Nazi skinheads as well as a strong current of homosexuality which he claimed existed amongst the leadership. The new party ambitiously launched itself as an alternative to the Conservative Party and hoped to win votes and members from the right wing of the Tories. Like the British Democratic Party, which broke away from the NF at the same time, it sought to distance itself from the vote-losing open Nazism that both groups associated with Tyndall, Webster and the other leaders of the NF. The Movement produced its own newspaper, Frontline News as well as a magazine Excalibur, the latter edited by Terry Savage, a veteran of the National Labour Party.

== Development ==
The party campaigned for the 1981 Greater London Council election although the results proved disappointing and during the course of the campaign its Excalibur House HQ was damaged by a fire and a campaigner, Anthony Donnelly, was murdered in Hackney. Following this disastrous election, Fountaine announced his retirement from politics, leaving the Constitutional Movement without a strong leader.

The failure of this campaign, in which the party lost out to both the original NF and the New National Front, saw the party go into decline. Not long after this the party was contacted by Tyndall, Ray Hill and Charles Parker as part of their Committee for Nationalist Unity initiative in which they were aiming to forge a united far-right group from the NNF, Hill's wing of the British Movement and other groups such as the Constitutional Movement. Although the group did not join this initiative it lost Robin May, its main organiser in the East End of London, to Tyndall's group. A number of party members followed May and joined him in attending the March 1982 meeting at the Charing Cross Hotel in which Tyndall, Parker, Hill, Kenneth McKilliam and John Peacock announced the conversion of the Committee for Nationalist Unity into the British National Party.

== Disappearance ==
The Constitutional Movement changed its name to the Nationalist Party soon after the formation of the BNP and under this title it contested five seats in the 1983 general election. It performed very poorly and the next time the party hit the headlines was when a former member, Richard Franklin, was revealed as a Conservative candidate in local elections in 1983.

The Nationalist Party made its last appearance in a 1984 by-election in the Southgate constituency, with James Kershaw polling only 80 votes in a seat won by Michael Portillo. The party was gone soon after this, with most of the members joining the British National Party.

== Elections contested ==
House of Commons of the United Kingdom
Election year	# of total votes	% of overall vote	# of seats won	# rank
1983	874 ▲	0.0% ▲	0 / 650	25/29

=== 1981 Greater London Council election ===
23 candidates stood as Constitutional Movement and 2 candidates (Owen Hawke and Alan Wilkens) stood as National Front Constitution Movement.

Constituency	Candidate	Votes	Percentage
Barking	B White	104	0.5
Bethnal Green and Bow	Alan J Wilkens	257	1.3
Brent East	RJ Marsh	328	1.5
Brent North	M Stubbs	226	0.7
Brent South	R Tainton	165	0.7
Brentford and Isleworth	GD Pearce	104	0.3
Dagenham	M Sowerby	91	0.4
Deptford	TM Smith	91	0.4
Ealing North	JA Murphy	159	0.4
Edmonton	D Izzard	145	0.6
Enfield North	RP Johns	130	0.4
Erith and Crayford	Owen Hawke	559	1.9
Harrow East	Leslie ED Le Croisette	296	1.3
Harrow West	BW Robinson	271	1.0
Holborn and St Pancras South	Paul T Kavanagh	218	1.5
Islington Central	P Holden	118	0.8
Islington North	SP Bowdidge	152	0.9
Islington South and Finsbury	FT Theobald	109	0.8
Lewisham West	Susan C. McKenzie	100	0.4
Newham North East	TS Bennett	173	0.7
Ruislip-Northwood	GW Bryant	196	0.7
Southall	R Franklin	132	0.4
Southgate	Mrs JE Izzard	189	0.7
Tottenham	A Clark	277	1.7
Uxbridge	Jane O. Stubbs	148	0.5

=== 1983 general election ===
Constituency	Candidate	Votes	%
Coventry South West	M Williamson	214	0.43
Hendon North	Bernard Franklin	194	0.52
Kingston upon Hull North	Robert Tenney	222	0.44
Stockport	Ken Walker	194	0.44
Southwark and Bermondsey	Susan McKenzie	50	0.15

=== 1981 Croydon North West by-election ===
Candidate	Votes	%
Susan McKenzie	111	0.3

=== 1984 Enfield Southgate by-election ===
Candidate	Votes	%
James Kershaw	80	0.2
