= Edmonton (electoral division) =

Electoral division in Greater London, 1973–1986

- Former electoral division for the Greater London Council
- District: Enfield
- Electorate: 61,148 (1973); 60,839 (1977); 59,287 (1981); 60,798 (1984)
- Major settlements: Edmonton
- Area: 1,539 hectares (15.39 km^{2})

Former electoral division
- Created: 1973
- Abolished: 1986
- Member: 1
- Created from: Enfield

Edmonton was an electoral division for the purposes of elections to the Greater London Council. The constituency elected one councillor for a four-year term in 1973, 1977 and 1981, with the final term extended for an extra year ahead of the abolition of the Greater London Council.

== History ==
It was planned to use the same boundaries as the Westminster Parliament constituencies for election of councillors to the Greater London Council (GLC), as had been the practice for elections to the predecessor London County Council, but those that existed in 1965 crossed the Greater London boundary. Until new constituencies could be settled, the 32 London boroughs were used as electoral areas. The London Borough of Enfield formed the Enfield electoral division. This was used for the Greater London Council elections in 1964, 1967 and 1970.

The new constituencies were settled following the Second Periodic Review of Westminster constituencies and the new electoral division matched the boundaries of the Edmonton parliamentary constituency.

It covered an area of 1,539 hectares (15.39 km^{2}).

== Elections ==
The Edmonton constituency was used for the Greater London Council elections in 1973, 1977 and 1981. One councillor was elected at each election using first-past-the-post voting.

=== 1973 election ===
The fourth election to the GLC (and first using revised boundaries) was held on 12 April 1973. The electorate was 61,148 and one Labour Party councillor was elected. The turnout was 33.8%. The councillor was elected for a three-year term. This was extended for an extra year in 1976 when the electoral cycle was switched to four-yearly.

1973 Greater London Council election: Edmonton
Party	Candidate	Votes	%	±%
Labour	Bernard Stephen Mason	11,058	53.60	
Conservative	John William Victor Attwood	7,256	35.14	
Liberal	Ralph J R Scott	1,870	9.05	
Action	Martin F. Moloney	457	2.21	
Turnout				
Labour win (new seat)				

=== 1977 election ===
The fifth election to the GLC (and second using revised boundaries) was held on 5 May 1977. The electorate was 60,839 and one Conservative Party councillor was elected. The turnout was 42.8%. The councillor was elected for a four-year term.

1977 Greater London Council election: Edmonton
Party	Candidate	Votes	%	±%
Conservative	Harry William Corpe	12,429	47.78	
Labour	John Golden Warren	9,480	36.45	
National Front	Royston Clive Pert	2,545	9.78	
Liberal	J. Simkins	1,064	4.09	
GLC Abolitionist Campaign	Terence Jiggins	507	1.95	
Turnout				
Conservative gain from Labour		Swing		

=== 1981 election ===
The sixth and final election to the GLC (and third using revised boundaries) was held on 7 May 1981. The electorate was 59,287 and one Labour Party councillor was elected. The turnout was 42.0%. The councillor was elected for a four-year term, extended by an extra year by the Local Government (Interim Provisions) Act 1984, ahead of the abolition of the council.

1981 Greater London Council election: Edmonton
Party	Candidate	Votes	%	±%
Labour	Kenneth Watson Little	13,831	55.59	
Conservative	Ellen E. Saul	7,813	31.41	
Liberal	Barbara G. Adams	2,360	9.48	
NNF	David J. Bruce	496	1.99	
Abolish the GLC	Pamela J. Adams	235	0.94	
Constitutional Movement	David Izzard	145	0.58	
Turnout				
Labour gain from Conservative		Swing		

=== 1984 by-election ===
A by-election was held on 20 September 1984, following the resignation of Kenneth Watson Little. The by-election coincided with others in Hayes and Harlington, Lewisham West and Paddington.

The electorate was 60,798 and one Labour Party councillor was elected. The turnout was 20.4%.

Edmonton by-election, 1984
Party	Candidate	Votes	%	±%
Labour	Kenneth Watson Little	9,340	75.32	
Alliance	Alan J. Wall	2,007	16.18	
Ind. Conservative	Kevin Miller	802	6.47	
National Front	Brent A. Cheetham	167	1.35	
Ecology	Stephen Rooney	87	0.70	
Turnout				
Labour hold		Swing		
