= Brent (electoral division) =

Electoral division in Greater London, 1965–1973

- Former electoral division for the Greater London Council
- Brent electoral division boundaries
- District: London Borough of Brent
- Population: 281,530 (1969 estimate)
- Electorate: 206,110 (1964); 199,119 (1967); 204,089 (1970)
- Area: 10,923.6 acres (44.206 km^{2})

Former electoral division
- Created: 1965
- Abolished: 1973
- Member(s): 4
- Replaced by: Brent East, Brent North and Brent South

Brent was an electoral division for the purposes of elections to the Greater London Council. The constituency elected four councillors for a three-year term in 1964, 1967 and 1970.

== History ==
It was planned to use the same boundaries as the Westminster Parliament constituencies for election of councillors to the Greater London Council (GLC), as had been the practice for elections to the predecessor London County Council, but those that existed in 1965 crossed the Greater London boundary. Until new constituencies could be settled, the 32 London boroughs were used as electoral areas which therefore created a constituency called Brent.

The electoral division was replaced from 1973 by the single-member electoral divisions of Brent East, Brent North and Brent South.

== Elections ==
The Brent constituency was used for the Greater London Council elections in 1964, 1967 and 1970. Four councillors were elected at each election using first-past-the-post voting.

=== 1964 election ===
The first election was held on 9 April 1964, a year before the council came into its powers. The electorate was 206,110 and four Labour Party councillors were elected. With 100,538 people voting, the turnout was 48.8%. The councillors were elected for a three-year term.

1964 Greater London Council election: Brent
| Party | Candidate | Votes | % | ±% |
|---|---|---|---|---|
| Labour | Muriel Rose Forbes | 46,786 | | |
| Labour | Peter Otwell | 46,307 | | |
| Labour | Illtyd Harrington | 46,284 | | |
| Labour | Frank Towell | 45,552 | | |
| Conservative | Ruby Georgina Nancy Taylor | 38,500 | | |
| Conservative | C. H. Ansted | 38,221 | | |
| Conservative | H. J. C. Faulkner | 38,079 | | |
| Conservative | Alfred Abram Berney | 37,892 | | |
| Liberal | E. Baker | 11,180 | | |
| Liberal | J. E. C. Perry | 10,727 | | |
| Liberal | G. Phelps | 10,416 | | |
| Liberal | M. R. Uziell-Hamilton | 8,029 | | |
| Communist | M. E. Alcock | 3,574 | | |
| Communist | L. G. Burt | 2,722 | | |
| Turnout | | | | |
| Labour win (new seat) | | | | |
| Labour win (new seat) | | | | |
| Labour win (new seat) | | | | |
| Labour win (new seat) | | | | |

=== 1967 election ===
The second election was held on 13 April 1967. The electorate was 199,119 and four Conservative Party councillors were elected. With 91,460 people voting, the turnout was 45.9%. The councillors were elected for a three-year term.

1967 Greater London Council election: Brent
| Party | Candidate | Votes | % | ±% |
|---|---|---|---|---|
| Conservative | Ruby Georgina Nancy Taylor | 47,901 | | |
| Conservative | Alfred Abram Berney | 47,305 | | |
| Conservative | Alan Hardy | 46,596 | | |
| Conservative | Ann McVicker Forbes-Cockell | 43,709 | | |
| Labour | Muriel Rose Forbes | 36,799 | | |
| Labour | Illtyd Harrington | 32,185 | | |
| Labour | C. Shaw | 31,184 | | |
| Labour | Frank Towell | 30,678 | | |
| Liberal | V. E. Bennett | 6,914 | | |
| Liberal | J. A. Bunce | 6,408 | | |
| Liberal | D. de Vere Webb | 5,689 | | |
| Liberal | M. J. Mole | 5,588 | | |
| Communist | L. Bridges | 2,765 | | |
| Conservative gain from Labour | | Swing | | |
| Conservative gain from Labour | | Swing | | |
| Conservative gain from Labour | | Swing | | |
| Conservative gain from Labour | | Swing | | |

=== 1970 election ===
The third election was held on 9 April 1970. The electorate was 204,089 and four Conservative Party councillors were elected. With 78,004 people voting, the turnout was 38.2%. The councillors were elected for a three-year term.

1970 Greater London Council election: Brent
| Party | Candidate | Votes | % | ±% |
|---|---|---|---|---|
| Conservative | Ann McVicker Forbes-Cockell | 38,517 | | |
| Conservative | Ruby Georgina Nancy Taylor | 38,312 | | |
| Conservative | Alfred Abram Berney | 38,114 | | |
| Conservative | Alan Hardy | 38,060 | | |
| Labour | Muriel Rose Forbes | 32,424 | | |
| Labour | Illtyd Harrington | 32,082 | | |
| Labour | R. Thompson | 31,180 | | |
| Labour | Y. Sieve | 31,015 | | |
| Liberal | V. E. Bennett | 3,683 | | |
| Liberal | C. Coburn | 3,470 | | |
| Liberal | G. F. Elmer | 3,182 | | |
| Liberal | J. R. Kingsbury | 3,147 | | |
| Communist | L. G. Burt | 1,386 | | |
| Communist | L. Bridges | 1,354 | | |
| Homes before Roads | M. Hawkes | 1,175 | | |
| Homes before Roads | J. M. T. Hope | 1,110 | | |
| Homes before Roads | R. T. Webster | 1,006 | | |
| Homes before Roads | K. M. Runcie | 958 | | |
| Union Movement | R. J. Noble | 366 | | |
| Turnout | | | | |
| Conservative hold | | Swing | | |
| Conservative hold | | Swing | | |
| Conservative hold | | Swing | | |
