= Illtyd Harrington =

Welsh politician

- Harrington in 1998
- Born: 14 July 1931; Merthyr Tydfil, Wales
- Died: 1 October 2015 (aged 84)
- Education: Dowlais School, Trinity University College, Carmarthen
- Occupation: politician
- Known for: Greater London Council
- Notable work: Freedom Pass, saved Regent's Canal
- Political party: Labour Party
- Partner: Christopher "Chris" Downes
- Parents: Timothy Harrington (father); Sarah (née Burchell) Harrington (mother)
- Relatives: Richard Harrington (nephew)

Illtyd Harrington (14 July 1931 – 1 October 2015) was a British Labour Party politician who served as deputy leader of the Greater London Council (1981–84) and then subsequently as chairman (1984–85). He was a political ally of Ken Livingstone.

== Personal life ==
Harrington was a Welshman born in Merthyr Tydfil to Timothy and Sarah (née Burchell) Harrington. It was a mixed marriage; his mother was a devout Catholic. His father was an atheist and Communist, who fought against the Fascists in the Spanish Civil War. His mother, known as "Sally", was also an anti-fascist. In the poverty of the 1930s, she also sold her wedding ring to keep the family for a week, telling her husband it had dropped down the sink.

"She beat up the national organiser of the British Union of Fascists – she was a woman not of reflection, but of action. He was coming out with all this racist filth and she went for him with her shoe. And then she took off with the fascists chasing her."

Harrington was educated at St Illtyds Roman Catholic School Dowlais before going up to Trinity University College, Carmarthen (now part of University of Wales Trinity Saint David) to become a teacher. There he became a friend of Dylan Thomas. He moved to London after gaining employment in Brixton, before becoming a geography teacher at Kennington Secondary school. Then he moved on to become head of English at Daneford School in Bethnal Green. His friends in the East End had included Reggie and Ronnie Kray, the gangsters. He learnt the arts of welterweight boxing, plus watching his team West Ham United on a Saturday.

Harrington was openly gay and lived for fifty years with his partner, Christopher "Chris" Downes, who worked as a theatrical dresser for Laurence Olivier and Maggie Smith. Downes became a board director of the National Theatre on the South Bank. Both men were active members of the board of trustees of the National Youth Theatre. They shared a house in London and later in Brighton, where they entertained the glitterati. Actors were welcome in their house. Both were heavily involved as writers and editors of The Camden New Journal and West End Extra. Downes died in 2003. Harrington died on 1 October 2015, aged 84. He is survived by two siblings, Kathleen and Paul.

Harrington's nephew is actor Richard Harrington.

== Political career ==
Harrington's political career started with election to Paddington Borough Council in 1959 for the Harrow Road ward. Harrington was responsible for exposing the racketeering landlord Peter Rachman. In 1964, he moved to the newly formed Westminster City Council, representing the new Harrow Road ward. He lost his seat in 1968, but returned to it in 1971, remaining a councillor until 1978.

He was elected in 1964 to represent Brent on the Greater London Council. He lost his seat at the 1967 election and stood unsuccessfully in 1970. He served as an alderman on the council from 1970 to 1973. He was elected to the new seat of Brent South in 1973 and was re-elected in 1977 and 1981.

He was rejected as a potential parliamentary candidate for Merthyr Tydfil. He coveted the chance to represent his cherished Merthyr and was "bitterly disappointed" to not be selected.

He was deputy leader of the GLC from 1973 to 1977 and again from 1981. He was chairman of the council's policy and resources committee from 4 May 1973. He was a member of Harold Wilson's kitchen cabinet when Labour returned to power in 1974. It was promulgated that he might be offered a peerage, but both MI5 and MI6 were investigating the cabinet for suspected incidents of Soviet espionage, and he was refused.

In 1980, the leader of the GLC, Sir Reg Goodwin retired. Harrington tried to become leader of the group on the council on the centre-left, but became deputy to Andrew McIntosh. He had perhaps not anticipated the flood of hard left councillors elected in 1981, who staged a coup to oust McIntosh in favour of Ken Livingstone. Livingstone told Harrington, "Of course I am not going to oust you as deputy leader, you are the acceptable face of extremism".

Early in his career, Harrington developed the Freedom Pass, which gave free travel on London buses to the elderly and disabled. Harrington worked to save the Regent's Canal from demolition and was appointed as the first president of Inland Waterways Amenity Advisory Council, which became a model for the Rail Passenger's User Council introduced under Tony Blair's premiership. Harrington was chosen a member of the British Waterways Board.

He was the penultimate Chairman of the Greater London Council from 1984 to 1985.

Civic offices
Preceded by Harvey Hinds	Chairman of the Greater London Council; 1984–1985	Succeeded by Tony Banks
