= Harrow West (electoral division) =

Electoral division in Greater London, 1973–1986

- Former electoral division for the Greater London Council
- District: Harrow
- Electorate: 56,676 (1973); 56,711 (1977); 57,172 (1981)
- Area: 1,789 hectares (17.89 km^{2})

Former electoral division
- Created: 1973
- Abolished: 1986
- Member: 1
- Created from: Harrow

Harrow West was an electoral division for the purposes of elections to the Greater London Council. The constituency elected one councillor for a four-year term in 1973, 1977 and 1981, with the final term extended for an extra year ahead of the abolition of the Greater London Council.

== History ==
It was planned to use the same boundaries as the Westminster Parliament constituencies for election of councillors to the Greater London Council (GLC), as had been the practice for elections to the predecessor London County Council, but those that existed in 1965 crossed the Greater London boundary. Until new constituencies could be settled, the 32 London boroughs were used as electoral areas. The London Borough of Harrow formed the Harrow electoral division. This was used for the Greater London Council elections in 1964, 1967 and 1970.

The new constituencies were settled following the Second Periodic Review of Westminster constituencies and the new electoral division matched the boundaries of the Harrow West parliamentary constituency.

It covered an area of 1,789 hectares (17.89 km^{2}).

== Elections ==
The Harrow West constituency was used for the Greater London Council elections in 1973, 1977 and 1981. One councillor was elected at each election using first-past-the-post voting. Horace Cutler, who was successful at all three elections, was Leader of the Greater London Council from 1973 to 1977. He was previously elected to represent Harrow in 1964, 1967 and 1970.

=== 1973 election ===
The fourth election to the GLC (and first using revised boundaries) was held on 12 April 1973. The electorate was 56,676 and one Conservative Party councillor was elected. The turnout was 42.5%. The councillor was elected for a three-year term. This was extended for an extra year in 1976 when the electoral cycle was switched to four-yearly.

1973 Greater London Council election: Harrow West
Party	Candidate	Votes	%	±%
Conservative	Horace Walter Cutler	12,498	51.90	
Labour	N. A. Hyman	5,407	22.45	
Liberal	Henry Young	5,230	21.73	
Action Party for Britain First	R. C. Ramage	947	3.93	
Turnout				
Conservative win (new seat)				

=== 1977 election ===
The fifth election to the GLC (and second using revised boundaries) was held on 5 May 1977. The electorate was 56,711 and one Conservative Party councillor was elected. The turnout was 46.1%. The councillor was elected for a four-year term.

1977 Greater London Council election: Harrow West
Party	Candidate	Votes	%	±%
Conservative	Horace Walter Cutler	19,136	66.50	
Labour	Alan G. M. Kinchin	4,748	16.49	
Liberal	James S. S. Bond	3,567	12.39	
National Front	B. V. Maisey	1,339	4.65	
Turnout				
Conservative hold		Swing		

=== 1981 election ===
The sixth and final election to the GLC (and third using revised boundaries) was held on 7 May 1981. The electorate was 57,172 and one Conservative Party councillor was elected. The turnout was 46.1%. The councillor was elected for a four-year term, extended by an extra year by the Local Government (Interim Provisions) Act 1984, ahead of the abolition of the council.

1981 Greater London Council election: Harrow West
Party	Candidate	Votes	%	±%
Conservative	Horace Walter Cutler	14,524	55.27	
Labour	Kerry Underwood	6.542	24.90	
Liberal	Ronald Fraser Dick	4,943	18.81	
Constitutional Movement	Bernard W. Robinson	271	1.03	
Turnout				
Conservative hold		Swing		
