= Enfield North (electoral division) =

Electoral division in Greater London, 1973–1986

- Former electoral division for the Greater London Council
- Enfield North electoral division boundaries
- District: Enfield
- Electorate: 67,728 (1973); 67,685 (1977); 67,256 (1981)
- Area: 3,696 hectares (36.96 km^{2})

Former electoral division
- Created: 1973
- Abolished: 1986
- Member: 1
- Created from: Enfield

Enfield North was an electoral division for the purposes of elections to the Greater London Council. The constituency elected one councillor for a four-year term in 1973, 1977 and 1981, with the final term extended for an extra year ahead of the abolition of the Greater London Council.

== History ==
It was planned to use the same boundaries as the Westminster Parliament constituencies for election of councillors to the Greater London Council (GLC), as had been the practice for elections to the predecessor London County Council, but those that existed in 1965 crossed the Greater London boundary. Until new constituencies could be settled, the 32 London boroughs were used as electoral areas. The London Borough of Enfield formed the Enfield electoral division. This was used for the Greater London Council elections in 1964, 1967 and 1970.

The new constituencies were settled following the Second Periodic Review of Westminster constituencies and the new electoral division matched the boundaries of the Enfield North parliamentary constituency.

It covered an area of 3,696 hectares (36.96 km^{2}).

== Elections ==
The Enfield North constituency was used for the Greater London Council elections in 1973, 1977 and 1981. One councillor was elected at each election using first-past-the-post voting.

=== 1973 election ===
The fourth election to the GLC (and first using revised boundaries) was held on 12 April 1973. The electorate was 67,728 and one Labour Party councillor was elected. The turnout was 44.6%. The councillor was elected for a three-year term. This was extended for an extra year in 1976 when the electoral cycle was switched to four-yearly.

1973 Greater London Council election: Enfield North
Party	Candidate	Votes	%	±%
Labour	John Howard White	11,202	37.09	
Liberal	L. Eric L. Ridge	11,062	36.63	
Conservative	Bryan Michael Deece Cassidy	6,725	22.28	
National Front	Kenneth Thomas Robinson	1,204	3.99	
Turnout				
Labour win (new seat)				

=== 1977 election ===
The fifth election to the GLC (and second using revised boundaries) was held on 5 May 1977. The electorate was 67,685 and one Conservative Party councillor was elected. The turnout was 49.1%. The councillor was elected for a four-year term.

1977 Greater London Council election: Enfield North
Party	Candidate	Votes	%	±%
Conservative	John Alfred Boris Connors	14,975	45.09	
Labour	John Howard White	9,311	28.05	
Liberal	L. Eric L. Ridge	6,342	19.10	
National Front	Keith Davies	2,414	7.27	
GLC Abolitionist Campaign	Dennis J. E. Keighley	163	0.49	
Turnout				
Conservative gain from Labour		Swing		

=== 1981 election ===
The sixth and final election to the GLC (and third using revised boundaries) was held on 7 May 1981. The electorate was 67,256 and one Labour Party councillor was elected. The turnout was 45.1%. The councillor was elected for a four-year term, extended by an extra year by the Local Government (Interim Provisions) Act 1984, ahead of the abolition of the council.

1981 Greater London Council election: Enfield North
Party	Candidate	Votes	%	±%
Labour	Anthony McBrearty	12,994	42.82	
Conservative	John Alfred Boris Connors	12,249	40.35	
Liberal	David R. Affleck	3,982	13.12	
Ecology	David J. Merryweather	446	1.47	
NNF	David G. Robinson	377	1.24	
Abolish the GLC	Dennis J. E. Keighley	186	0.61	
Constitutional Movement	Ramon P. Johns	130	0.43	
Turnout				
Labour gain from Conservative		Swing		
