= Lewisham (electoral division) =

Electoral division in Greater London, 1965–1973

- Former electoral division for the Greater London Council
- District: London Borough of Lewisham
- Population: 282,080 (1969 estimate)
- Electorate: 201,636 (1964); 195,144 (1967); 201,497 (1970)
- Area: 8,581.2 acres (34.727 km^{2})

Former electoral division
- Created: 1965
- Abolished: 1973
- Member(s): 4
- Replaced by: Deptford, Lewisham East, Lewisham West

Lewisham was an electoral division for the purposes of elections to the Greater London Council. The constituency elected four councillors for a three-year term in 1964, 1967 and 1970.

== History ==
It was planned to use the same boundaries as the Westminster Parliament constituencies for election of councillors to the Greater London Council (GLC), as had been the practice for elections to the predecessor London County Council, but those that existed in 1965 crossed the Greater London boundary. Until new constituencies could be settled, the 32 London boroughs were used as electoral areas which therefore created a constituency called Lewisham.

The electoral division was replaced from 1973 by the single-member electoral divisions of Deptford, Lewisham East, Lewisham West.

== Elections ==
The Lewisham constituency was used for the Greater London Council elections in 1964, 1967 and 1970. Four councillors were elected at each election using first-past-the-post voting.

=== 1964 election ===
The first election was held on 9 April 1964, a year before the council came into its powers. The electorate was 201,636 and four Labour Party councillors were elected. With 87,184 people voting, the turnout was 43.2%. The councillors were elected for a three-year term.

1964 Greater London Council election: Lewisham
| Party | Candidate | Votes | % | ±% |
|---|---|---|---|---|
| Labour | David Walter Chalkley | 50,103 | | |
| Labour | Alec Alan Grant | 49,756 | | |
| Labour | John Charles Henry | 49,373 | | |
| Labour | Harold Charles Shearman | 48,631 | | |
| Conservative | N. W. Farmer | 33,614 | | |
| Conservative | N. D. Banks | 32,809 | | |
| Conservative | J. B. W. Holderness | 32,461 | | |
| Conservative | Mrs. D. E. New | 32,199 | | |
| Communist | S. P. Bent | 4,159 | | |
| Christian Independent | F. A. Harvie | 2,895 | | |
| Turnout | | | | |
| Labour win (new seat) | | | | |
| Labour win (new seat) | | | | |
| Labour win (new seat) | | | | |
| Labour win (new seat) | | | | |

=== 1967 election ===
The second election was held on 13 April 1967. The electorate was 195,144 and four Conservative Party councillors were elected. With 82,357 people voting, the turnout was 42.2%. The councillors were elected for a three-year term.

1967 Greater London Council election: Lewisham
| Party | Candidate | Votes | % | ±% |
|---|---|---|---|---|
| Conservative | Christopher Bland | 39,817 | | |
| Conservative | Michael John Wheeler | 39,684 | | |
| Conservative | Arthur James Hichisson | 39,070 | | |
| Conservative | Frederick Walter Weyer | 38,678 | | |
| Labour | David Walter Chalkley | 35,552 | | |
| Labour | Alec Alan Grant | 35,469 | | |
| Labour | John Charles Henry | 35,035 | | |
| Labour | Sir Harold Shearman | 34,968 | | |
| Liberal | J. D. Eagle | 4,451 | | |
| Liberal | R. P. Grundon | 4,344 | | |
| Liberal | R. Sizeland | 4,143 | | |
| Liberal | G. A. H. Kiloh | 3,639 | | |
| Communist | J. M. Delahoy | 2,221 | | |
| Communist | H. Barr | 2,043 | | |
| Union Movement | A. G. Nicholson | 1,729 | | |
| Turnout | | | | |
| Conservative gain from Labour | | Swing | | |
| Conservative gain from Labour | | Swing | | |
| Conservative gain from Labour | | Swing | | |
| Conservative gain from Labour | | Swing | | |

=== 1970 election ===
The third election was held on 9 April 1970. The electorate was 201,497 and four Labour Party councillors were elected. With 81,513 people voting, the turnout was 40.4%. The councillors were elected for a three-year term.

1970 Greater London Council election: Lewisham
| Party | Candidate | Votes | % | ±% |
|---|---|---|---|---|
| Labour | John Charles Henry | 40,682 | | |
| Labour | Brian Bastin | 40,646 | | |
| Labour | David Chalkley | 40,625 | | |
| Labour | Alec Grant | 40,422 | | |
| Conservative | Arthur James Hichisson | 35,943 | | |
| Conservative | J. C. Fairhead | 35,813 | | |
| Conservative | P. T. James | 35,646 | | |
| Conservative | Michael John Wheeler | 35,492 | | |
| Homes before Roads | K. P. Brem-Wilson | 1,763 | | |
| Homes before Roads | F. Davies | 1,724 | | |
| Homes before Roads | L. F. Hollingsworth | 1,580 | | |
| Liberal | A. R. P. Ley | 1,410 | | |
| Homes before Roads | R. Thompson | 1,261 | | |
| Independent Liberal | C. L. Morris | 1,250 | | |
| Liberal | D. Ruel-Bentall | 1,222 | | |
| Communist | M. H. Robinson | 1,159 | | |
| Liberal | I. S. T. Senior | 1,097 | | |
| Communist | L. F. Stannard | 1,063 | | |
| Liberal | C. J. Lazaro | 770 | | |
| Union Movement | A. J. Andrews | 360 | | |
| Independent | B. Ward | 303 | | |
| Turnout | | | | |
| Labour gain from Conservative | | Swing | | |
| Labour gain from Conservative | | Swing | | |
| Labour gain from Conservative | | Swing | | |
| Labour gain from Conservative | | Swing | | |
