= Horace Cutler =

British politician

Sir Horace Cutler OBE JP
- Cutler in 1977

4th Leader of the Greater London Council
- In office 1977–1981
- Preceded by: Reg Goodwin
- Succeeded by: Ken Livingstone

Member of the Greater London Council for Harrow West
- In office 12 April 1973 – 31 March 1986

Member of the Greater London Council for Harrow
- In office 9 April 1964 – 12 April 1973

Personal details
- Born: Horace Walter Cutler; 28 July 1912 Tottenham, Middlesex, England
- Died: 2 March 1997 (aged 84) Gerrards Cross, Buckinghamshire, England
- Party: Conservative
- Spouses: Betty Martin (m. 1934; div. 1954); Christine Muthesius (m. 1957)
- Children: 5

Sir Horace Walter Cutler OBE JP (28 July 1912 – 2 March 1997) was a British Conservative politician who served as leader of the Greater London Council from 1977 to 1981. He was noted for his showmanship and flair for publicity, and some of his right-wing economic views were seen as forerunners of Thatcherism.

== Early life ==
Cutler was born in Tottenham, one of seven children born to a wealthy family. He went to Harrow County School for Boys and Hereford Cathedral School, later joining his father's building business, which he helped lead after his father's death in 1934. He spent World War II in the Royal Naval Volunteer Reserve.

== Local politics ==
Cutler became involved in politics due to dissatisfaction with the strictness of building laws. In 1952, he first went into politics when he was elected as a Conservative member of Harrow Borough Council, where he became Leader of the Council in 1961. He was also elected to Middlesex County Council and was its last Leader, in 1963, before it was abolished to make way for the Greater London Council.

== Greater London Council ==
Cutler took one of the Harrow seats on the GLC at its first election, switching to Harrow West from 1973. He remained a member of it throughout its existence, one of only eight people to do so. His prominence at Middlesex made him well-known and he served as Deputy Leader under Sir Desmond Plummer when the Conservatives were in control from 1967. Plummer gave Cutler the Chairmanship of the Housing Committee which gave him responsibility for the GLC's hundreds of thousands of units of council housing.

Cutler believed that local authorities had no role in housing, and instituted a scheme to allow tenants to buy their own homes at a discounted price, which later became one of the tenets of Thatcherism. He also forcibly transferred much of the GLC housing stock to the London Boroughs. Cutler was for many years a member of the Conservative Monday Club, and wrote a booklet in 1970 entitled Rents – Chaos or Commonsense? for the club.

=== Leader of the GLC ===
When the Conservatives lost control of the GLC in 1973 and Sir Desmond Plummer resigned as their Leader in 1974, Cutler was chosen as his successor. When he won the 1977 GLC elections he became Leader. He was sceptical of the merits of the GLC, seeing it as "too big, too remote and too shadowy", and set up an inquiry under Sir Frank Marshall into its powers and existence; Marshall found enough to justify the continuation of the GLC.

Cutler wanted to extend the Jubilee line into Docklands but was refused the money by the Labour Government. Investment on the London Underground was not substantial and decisions taken during his period of office have been criticised subsequently for leading to poor infrastructure in the long term. Cutler was also noted for meddling in detailed Underground management, which London Transport Chairman Peter Masefield had to persuade him to stop. He also made a bid to host the 1988 Summer Olympics, but the national government were not supportive of this.

Horace Cutler was knighted in the 1979 Birthday Honours with the support of Margaret Thatcher, whom he had deeply admired.

Cutler was the last Conservative leader of the GLC, and the last elected leader of the party in London-wide government until Boris Johnson in 2008.

=== Loss of power ===
In the 1981 GLC elections, Cutler made a great deal of the fact that if Labour won, its local leader, Andrew McIntosh, was likely to be replaced by the more left-wing Ken Livingstone. He concentrated on attacking Livingstone during the campaign, saying that he wished to establish a Marxist power-base in London. Nevertheless, Labour won, and McIntosh was duly voted out in favour of Livingstone. Cutler gave up the Conservative leadership in 1982. The Conservatives added a pledge to abolish the GLC in their next election manifesto. Cutler was not informed of this before it was published; he viewed this as a profound betrayal by Thatcher, and a permanent rift formed between the two. After the GLC was abolished in 1986, he left politics.

== Personal life ==
In 1934, Cutler married Betty Martin; they had one son and divorced in 1954. In 1957, he married Christine Muthesius, with whom he had four children. In retirement, Cutler lived in Ibiza for many years, but returned to England at the end of his life, dying at a care home in Gerrards Cross, Buckinghamshire, on 2 March 1997, aged 84.

Political offices
Preceded by Sir Reg Goodwin	Leader of the Greater London Council; 1977–1981	Succeeded by Ken Livingstone
Party political offices
Preceded by Desmond Plummer	Leader of the Conservative Party on the Greater London Council; 1974–1982	Succeeded by Alan Greengross
