= Trixie Gardner, Baroness Gardner of Parkes =

Australian-born British politician (1927–2024)

The Right Honourable The Baroness Gardner of Parkes AM JP
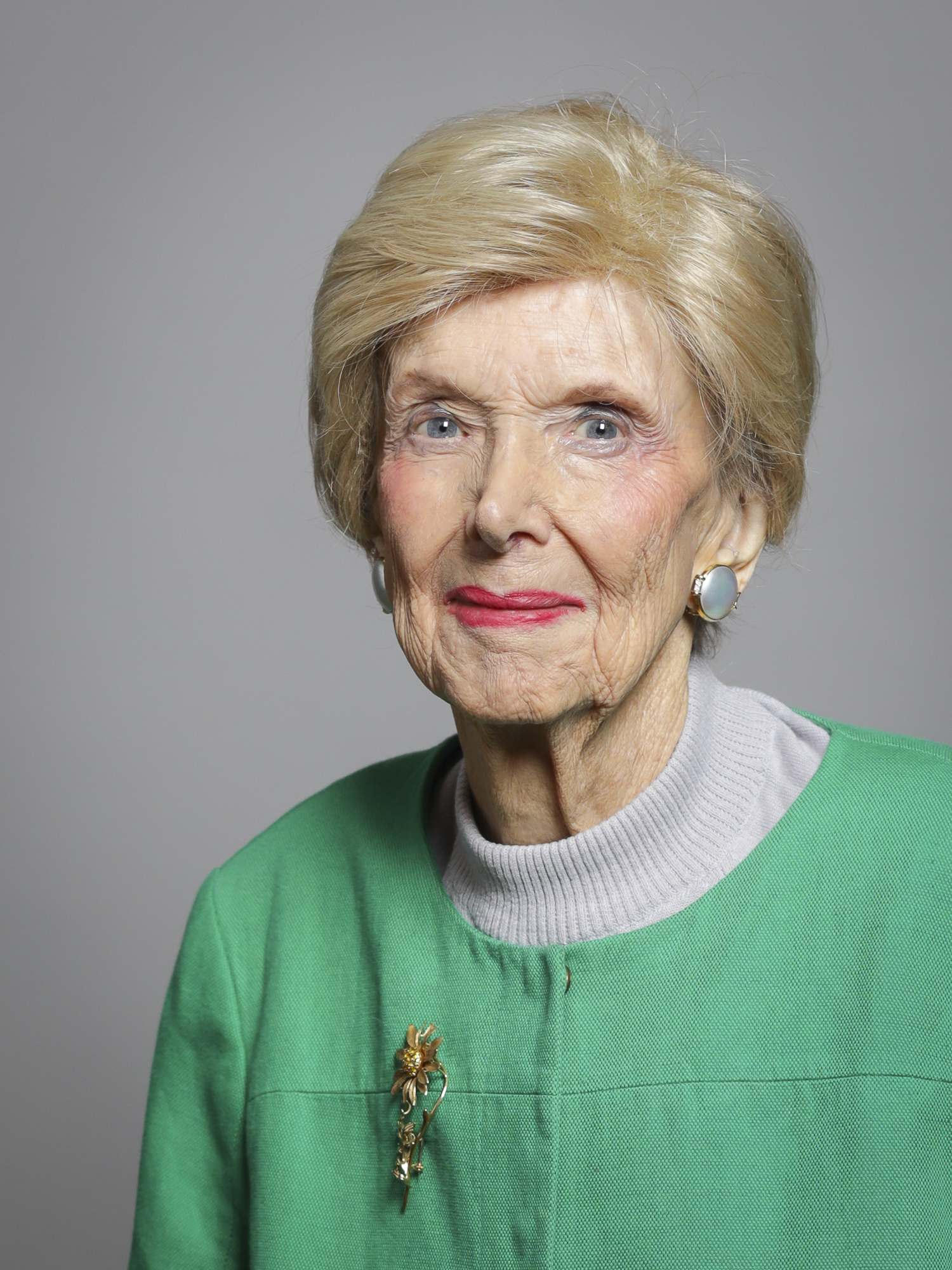
- Official portrait, 2019

Member of the House of Lords
- Lord Temporal
- Life peerage 19 June 1981 – 14 April 2024

Personal details
- Born: Rachel Trixie Anne McGirr; 17 July 1927 Parkes, New South Wales, Australia
- Died: 14 April 2024 (aged 96) London, England
- Citizenship: Australia; United Kingdom
- Party: Conservative
- Spouse: Kevin Gardner (m. 1956; died 2007)
- Relations: Jim McGirr (uncle); Patrick McGirr (uncle); Joe McGirr (nephew)
- Parent: Greg McGirr (father)
- Education: University of Sydney

Rachel Trixie Anne Gardner, Baroness Gardner of Parkes, AM, JP (née McGirr; 17 July 1927 – 14 April 2024) was an Australian-born British dentist and Conservative member of the House of Lords, in which she served for over 40 years. She was the first Australian woman to have been elevated to the peerage, and was the senior life peer in the House of Lords at the time of her death.

== Biography ==
=== Early life and education ===
Baroness Gardner was born in Parkes, New South Wales, the daughter of Greg McGirr, a former leader of the New South Wales Labor Party, and Rachel Rittenburg Miller (OBE). She earned a Bachelor of Dental Surgery (BDS) in 1954 from the University of Sydney, where she was a resident at Sancta Sophia College, and studied in Paris at Le Cordon Bleu. She moved to the UK in 1957.

=== Politics ===
Gardner was a councillor of Westminster City Council from 1968 to 1978 and was Lady Mayoress (when her husband was Lord Mayor) during 1987–88. In 1970, she stood for Parliament for the Conservative Party against Labour's Barbara Castle in Blackburn, and in February 1974 stood against the Liberal John Pardoe in North Cornwall. In 1971, she was made a Justice of the Peace. In addition, she was elected as a member of the Greater London Council (GLC) representing Havering (1970-1973) and Southgate (1977–1986) until the GLC's abolition. She held various directorships and was the UK Representative on the United Nations Status of Women Commission 1982–1988.

On 19 June 1981, Gardner was created a life peeress of the United Kingdom as Baroness Gardner of Parkes, of Southgate in Greater London, and of Parkes in the State of New South Wales and Commonwealth of Australia. She was ennobled for her two decades of community and local government work as a Conservative, the first Australian woman to be so honoured. On 4 April 2007, she was made an Honorary Fellow of the University of Sydney.

== Background ==
Gardner's father, Gregory, led the New South Wales Labor Party from March to July 1923. An uncle, James McGirr, was also in Labor politics, serving as Premier of New South Wales from 1947 to 1952. A nephew, Dr Jack McGirr, is a dentist in Lane Cove, a Sydney suburb, and is a former Mayor of Lane Cove Council.

== Personal life ==
Her husband, Kevin Gardner, was also a native of Australia. He was educated at Waverley College and won a scholarship to the University of Sydney to study dentistry, winning the Arnott Prize for oral surgery in 1954. He spent a year on the university teaching staff at the Sydney Dental Hospital before going to London in 1955. He married Trixie McGirr in 1956 in Paris, and they set up their home in London.

In May 1982, the year after she joined the House of Lords, Kevin was elected to Westminster City Council, where Trixie had been a councillor since 1968. He was the first Australian to be the Lord Mayor of Westminster. He was re-elected as a councillor in 2006 at age 75. Kevin Gardner died the following year, in 2007. The couple had three daughters: Joanna, Rachel and Sarah. Joanna was Mayor (2008–09) of the Royal Borough of Kensington and Chelsea, London. The Gardner family is devoutly Catholic.

Baroness Gardner was appointed Member of the Order of Australia (AM) in the 2003 Birthday Honours "for service to the promotion of Australian interests in parliamentary and government circles in the United Kingdom, and to the community."

Baroness Gardner died in London on 14 April 2024, at the age of 96.

== Oral History ==
Gardner was interviewed in 2016 by Caroline Baum. The recording can be found at the National Library of Australia.

== Arms ==
Coat of arms of Trixie Gardner, Baroness Gardner of Parkes
Notes Arms here displayed on a male escutcheon, with an inescutcheon argent Coronet Coronet of a Baron Escutcheon Per fess Azure and Vert in chief a representation of the constellation of the Southern Cross Argent issuing in base a Sun in Splendour Or all within a Bordure indented Gold Supporters Dexter: a Kangaroo Or gorged with a Crown Pallisado Vert grasping in the sinister forepaw a Branch of Tudor Roses slipped and leaved proper; Sinister: a Lion Or gorged with a Crown Pallisado Vert grasping in the dexter forepaw a Branch of Wattle slipped and leaved proper Compartment A Grassy Mount growing therefrom two Waratah Flowers slipped and leaved proper Motto Keep Going

== Bibliography ==
- They Work For You: UK Parliament voting, speaking search engine
- Elizabeth Sleeman (2001). The International Who's Who of Women 2002. Routledge. p. 198. ISBN 978-1-85743-122-3.
- The Long Table. Couper Street Books. November 2019. ISBN 978-1-99934-777-2.
