= Lewisham West (electoral division) =

Electoral division in Greater London, 1973–1986

- Former electoral division for the Greater London Council
- District: Lewisham
- Electorate: 62,835 (1973); 60,354 (1977); 59,303 (1980); 59,842 (1981); 60,128 (1984)
- Area: 1,151 hectares (11.51 km^{2})

Former electoral division
- Created: 1973
- Abolished: 1986
- Member: 1
- Created from: Lewisham

Lewisham West was an electoral division for the purposes of elections to the Greater London Council. The constituency elected one councillor for a four-year term in 1973, 1977 and 1981, with the final term extended for an extra year ahead of the abolition of the Greater London Council.

== History ==
It was planned to use the same boundaries as the Westminster Parliament constituencies for election of councillors to the Greater London Council (GLC), as had been the practice for elections to the predecessor London County Council, but those that existed in 1965 crossed the Greater London boundary. Until new constituencies could be settled, the 32 London boroughs were used as electoral areas. The London Borough of Lewisham formed the Lewisham electoral division. This was used for the Greater London Council elections in 1964, 1967 and 1970.

The new constituencies were settled following the Second Periodic Review of Westminster constituencies and the new electoral division matched the boundaries of the Lewisham West parliamentary constituency.

It covered an area of 1,151 hectares (11.51 km^{2}).

== Elections ==
The Lewisham West constituency was used for the Greater London Council elections in 1973, 1977 and 1981. One councillor was elected at each election using first-past-the-post voting.

=== 1973 election ===
The fourth election to the GLC (and first using revised boundaries) was held on 12 April 1973. The electorate was 62,835 and one Labour Party councillor was elected. The turnout was 41.7%. The councillor was elected for a three-year term. This was extended for an extra year in 1976 when the electoral cycle was switched to four-yearly.

1973 Greater London Council election: Lewisham West
| Party | Candidate | Votes | % | ±% |
|---|---|---|---|---|
| Labour | William Colbert Simson | 13,930 | 53.15 | |
| Conservative | Michael John Wheeler | 11,667 | 44.51 | |
| Communist | M. H. Robinson | 621 | 2.37 | |
| Turnout | | | | |
| Labour win (new seat) | | | | |

=== 1977 election ===
The fifth election to the GLC (and second using revised boundaries) was held on 5 May 1977. The electorate was 60,354 and one Conservative Party councillor was elected. The turnout was 48.4%. The councillor was elected for a four-year term.

1977 Greater London Council election: Lewisham West
| Party | Candidate | Votes | % | ±% |
|---|---|---|---|---|
| Conservative | Roger Eden Hiskey | 15,100 | 51.70 | |
| Labour | William Colbert Simson | 10,938 | 37.48 | |
| National Front | Leigh J Taylor | 1,202 | 4.12 | |
| Liberal | J. D. Eagle | 1,160 | 3.97 | |
| Communist | M. H. Robinson | 458 | 1.57 | |
| National Party | Sydney G Avis | 211 | 0.72 | |
| GLC Abolitionist Campaign | B. M. Smoker | 127 | 0.44 | |
| Turnout | | | | |
| Conservative gain from Labour | | Swing | | |

=== 1980 by-election ===
A by-election was held on 24 April 1980, following the death of Roger Eden Hiskey. The electorate was 59,303 and one Labour Party councillor was elected. The turnout was 36.5%.

Lewisham West by-election, 1980
| Party | Candidate | Votes | % | ±% |
|---|---|---|---|---|
| Labour | Alan Lewis Herbert | 11,004 | 50.77 | |
| Conservative | Robin F. Pitt | 9,322 | 43.01 | |
| Liberal | Godfrey A. Payne | 988 | 4.56 | |
| National Front | Lynda L. Mirabita | 361 | 1.67 | |
| Turnout | | | | |
| Labour gain from Conservative | | Swing | | |

=== 1981 election ===
The sixth and final election to the GLC (and third using revised boundaries) was held on 7 May 1981. The electorate was 59,842 and one Labour Party councillor was elected. The turnout was 44.9%. The councillor was elected for a four-year term, extended by an extra year by the Local Government (Interim Provisions) Act 1984, ahead of the abolition of the council.

1981 Greater London Council election: Lewisham West
| Party | Candidate | Votes | % | ±% |
|---|---|---|---|---|
| Labour | Alan Lewis Herbert | 12,984 | 48.35 | |
| Conservative | Robin F. Pitt | 10,709 | 39.85 | |
| Liberal | Gwilym J. Savell | 2,333 | 8.68 | |
| NNF | Ramon F. Hoy | 511 | 1.90 | |
| Ecology | Susan M. Kennedy | 242 | 0.90 | |
| Constitutional Movement | Susan C. McKenzie | 100 | 0.37 | |
| Turnout | | | | |
| Labour hold | | Swing | | |

=== 1984 by-election ===
A by-election was held on 20 September 1984, following the resignation of Alan Lewis Herbert. The by-election coincided with others in Edmonton, Hayes and Harlington and Paddington.

The electorate was 60,128 and one Labour Party councillor was elected. The turnout was 26.2%.

Lewisham West by-election, 1984
| Party | Candidate | Votes | % | ±% |
|---|---|---|---|---|
| Labour | Alan Lewis Herbert | 10,432 | 66.32 | |
| Liberal | Julian M. Davies | 4,715 | 29.98 | |
| Pro-Abolition Alliance | Michael Moore | 330 | 2.10 | |
| National Front | John G. Wright | 266 | 1.69 | |
| Turnout | | | | |
| Labour hold | | Swing | | |
