= Southgate (electoral division) =

Electoral division in Greater London, 1973–1986

- Former electoral division for the Greater London Council
- Southgate electoral division boundaries
- District: Enfield
- Electorate: 70,560 (1973); 69,919 (1977); 67,662 (1981)
- Major settlements: Southgate
- Area: 2,884 hectares (28.84 km^{2})

Former electoral division
- Created: 1973
- Abolished: 1986
- Member: 1
- Created from: Enfield

Southgate was an electoral division for the purposes of elections to the Greater London Council. The constituency elected one councillor for a four-year term in 1973, 1977 and 1981, with the final term extended for an extra year ahead of the abolition of the Greater London Council.

== History ==
It was planned to use the same boundaries as the Westminster Parliament constituencies for election of councillors to the Greater London Council (GLC), as had been the practice for elections to the predecessor London County Council, but those that existed in 1965 crossed the Greater London boundary. Until new constituencies could be settled, the 32 London boroughs were used as electoral areas. The London Borough of Enfield formed the Enfield electoral division. This was used for the Greater London Council elections in 1964, 1967 and 1970.

The new constituencies were settled following the Second Periodic Review of Westminster constituencies and the new electoral division matched the boundaries of the Southgate parliamentary constituency.

It covered an area of 2,884 hectares (28.84 km^{2}).

== Elections ==
The Southgate constituency was used for the Greater London Council elections in 1973, 1977 and 1981. One councillor was elected at each election using first-past-the-post voting.

=== 1973 election ===
The fourth election to the GLC (and first using revised boundaries) was held on 12 April 1973. The electorate was 70,560 and one Conservative Party councillor was elected. The turnout was 38.4%. The councillor was elected for a three-year term. This was extended for an extra year in 1976 when the electoral cycle was switched to four-yearly.

1973 Greater London Council election: Southgate
Party	Candidate	Votes	%	±%
Conservative	Thomas Broughton Mitcheson	15,857	58.54	
Liberal	Dennis Alan Coberman	5,896	21.77	
Labour	B. M. Barbuk	5,342	19.69	
Turnout				
Conservative win (new seat)				

=== 1977 election ===
The fifth election to the GLC (and second using revised boundaries) was held on 5 May 1977. The electorate was 69,919 and one Conservative Party councillor was elected. The turnout was 45.5%. The councillor was elected for a four-year term.

1977 Greater London Council election: Southgate
Party	Candidate	Votes	%	±%
Conservative	Rachel Trixie Anne Gardner	21,902	68.78	
Labour	Robert A. Dick	5,042	15.83	
Liberal	Cyril S. Pike	3,031	9.52	
National Front	Trevor M. Smith	1,576	4.95	
GLC Abolitionist Campaign	B. Stein	297	0.93	
Turnout				
Conservative hold		Swing		

=== 1981 election ===
The sixth and final election to the GLC (and third using revised boundaries) was held on 7 May 1981. The electorate was 67,662 and one Conservative Party councillor was elected. The turnout was 43.6%. The councillor was elected for a four-year term, extended by an extra year by the Local Government (Interim Provisions) Act 1984, ahead of the abolition of the council.

1981 Greater London Council election: Southgate
Party	Candidate	Votes	%	±%
Conservative	Rachel Trixie Anne Gardner	17,538	59.41	
Labour	Gladys E. M. Stanbridge	7,141	24.18	
Liberal	Alan M. Abrahams	3,997	13.54	
NNF	Mark W. Lavine	334	1.13	
Abolish the GLC	Colin Sibley	330	1.12	
Constitutional Movement	Janice E. Izzard	189	0.64	
Turnout				
Conservative hold		Swing		
