= Hillingdon (electoral division) =

Electoral division in Greater London, 1965–1973

- Former electoral division for the Greater London Council
- Hillingdon electoral division boundaries
- District: London Borough of Hillingdon
- Population: 237,050 (1969 estimate)
- Electorate: 153,060 (1964); 154,011 (1967); 167,046 (1970)
- Area: 27,266.3 acres (110.343 km^{2})

Former electoral division
- Created: 1965
- Abolished: 1973
- Member(s): 3
- Replaced by: Hayes and Harlington, Ruislip-Northwood and Uxbridge

Hillingdon was an electoral division for the purposes of elections to the Greater London Council. The constituency elected three councillors for a three-year term in 1964, 1967 and 1970.

== History ==
It was planned to use the same boundaries as the Westminster Parliament constituencies for election of councillors to the Greater London Council (GLC), as had been the practice for elections to the predecessor London County Council, but those that existed in 1965 crossed the Greater London boundary. Until new constituencies could be settled, the 32 London boroughs were used as electoral areas which therefore created a constituency called Hillingdon.

The electoral division was replaced from 1973 by the single-member electoral divisions of Hayes and Harlington, Ruislip-Northwood and Uxbridge.

== Elections ==
The Hillingdon constituency was used for the Greater London Council elections in 1964, 1967 and 1970. Three councillors were elected at each election using first-past-the-post voting.

=== 1964 election ===
The first election was held on 9 April 1964, a year before the council came into its powers. The electorate was 153,060 and three Labour Party councillors were elected. With 78,460 people voting, the turnout was 51.3%. The councillors were elected for a three-year term.

1964 Greater London Council election: Hillingdon
Party	Candidate	Votes	%	±%
Labour	William John Lipscombe	34,728		
Labour	Frank Herbert Rapley	33,216		
Labour	David John Davies	32,898		
Conservative	E. L. Ing	32,091		
Conservative	G. Corran	32,072		
Conservative	Leslie Freeman	31,715		
Liberal	S. H. Davidson	7,299		
Liberal	J. B. Leno	7,112		
Liberal	J. A. Friedlander	6,545		
Independent	T. H. Barnard	5,020		
Communist	F. Stanley	3,240		
Turnout				
Labour win (new seat)				
Labour win (new seat)				
Labour win (new seat)				

=== 1967 election ===
The second election was held on 13 April 1967. The electorate was 154,011 and three Conservative Party councillors were elected. With 81,699 people voting, the turnout was 53.0%. The councillors were elected for a three-year term.

1967 Greater London Council election: Hillingdon
Party	Candidate	Votes	%	±%
Conservative	Bernard John Brown	46,443		
Conservative	Andre William Potier	46,101		
Conservative	Christopher Charles Henry Chalker	45,237		
Labour	William John Lipscombe	27,394		
Labour	S. F. G. Walker	27,144		
Labour	Frank Herbert Rapley	25,412		
Liberal	P. G. Baker	5,420		
Liberal	S. H. Davidson	4,975		
Liberal	Miss B. Channon	4,898		
Communist	P. R. Pink	1,678		
Turnout				
Conservative gain from Labour		Swing		
Conservative gain from Labour		Swing		
Conservative gain from Labour		Swing		

=== 1970 election ===
The third election was held on 9 April 1970. The electorate was 167,046 and three Conservative Party councillors were elected. With 73,793 people voting, the turnout was 44.1%. The councillors were elected for a three-year term.

1970 Greater London Council election: Hillingdon
Party	Candidate	Votes	%	±%
Conservative	Bernard Joseph Brown	42,631		
Conservative	John Rowland Wilton Cox	42,058		
Conservative	George William Tremlett	40,640		
Labour	Frank Arthur Cooper	26,710		
Labour	A. J. Beasley	26,345		
Labour	A. J. Potts	25,033		
Liberal	S. H. Davidson	3,763		
Liberal	J. B. Leno	3,707		
Liberal	B. Outhwaite	3,308		
Communist	P. R. Pink	1,061		
Union Movement	M. J. Goodchild	685		
Turnout				
Conservative hold		Swing		
Conservative hold		Swing		
Conservative hold		Swing		
