= Ealing (electoral division) =

Electoral division in Greater London, 1965–1973

- Former electoral division for the Greater London Council
- Ealing electoral division boundaries
- District: London Borough of Ealing
- Population: 297,910 (1969 estimate)
- Electorate: 207,455 (1964); 204,223 (1967); 217,027 (1970)
- Area: 13,707.9 acres (55.474 km^{2})

Former electoral division
- Created: 1965
- Abolished: 1973
- Member(s): 4
- Replaced by: Acton, Ealing North and Southall

Ealing was an electoral division for the purposes of elections to the Greater London Council. The constituency elected four councillors for a three-year term in 1964, 1967 and 1970.

== History ==
It was planned to use the same boundaries as the Westminster Parliament constituencies for election of councillors to the Greater London Council (GLC), as had been the practice for elections to the predecessor London County Council, but those that existed in 1965 crossed the Greater London boundary. Until new constituencies could be settled, the 32 London boroughs were used as electoral areas which therefore created a constituency called Ealing.

The electoral division was replaced from 1973 by the single-member electoral divisions of Acton, Ealing North and Southall.

== Elections ==
The Ealing constituency was used for the Greater London Council elections in 1964, 1967 and 1970. Four councillors were elected at each election using first-past-the-post voting.

=== 1964 election ===
The first election was held on 9 April 1964, a year before the council came into its powers. The electorate was 207,455 and four Labour Party councillors were elected. With 107,455 people voting, the turnout was 51.8%. The councillors were elected for a three-year term.

1964 Greater London Council election: Ealing
| Party | Candidate | Votes | % | ±% |
|---|---|---|---|---|
| Labour | Peter Ernest Anderson | 50,949 | | |
| Labour | Christopher Thomas Higgins | 49,655 | | |
| Labour | George Francis Palmer | 49,304 | | |
| Labour | Ethel Winifred Jones | 49,253 | | |
| Conservative | Rose Henniker Heaton | 45,688 | | |
| Conservative | J. H. Ward | 43,971 | | |
| Conservative | E. L. Prodham | 43,118 | | |
| Conservative | R. F. Tovell | 42,894 | | |
| Liberal | H. C. N. Baylis | 8,649 | | |
| Liberal | J. E. Elsom | 8,272 | | |
| Liberal | S. E. Smith | 7,448 | | |
| Liberal | J. A. Sullivan | 7,299 | | |
| Independent | J. McConville | 3,311 | | |
| Communist | H. A. Tank | 3,137 | | |
| Turnout | | | | |
| Labour win (new seat) | | | | |
| Labour win (new seat) | | | | |
| Labour win (new seat) | | | | |
| Labour win (new seat) | | | | |

=== 1967 election ===
The second election was held on 13 April 1967. The electorate was 204,223 and four Conservative Party councillors were elected. With 98,420 people voting, the turnout was 48.2%. The councillors were elected for a three-year term.

1967 Greater London Council election: Ealing
| Party | Candidate | Votes | % | ±% |
|---|---|---|---|---|
| Conservative | Antony Thomas Reid Fletcher | 53,539 | | |
| Conservative | Maurice Patrick Gaffney | 52,965 | | |
| Conservative | John Graham | 52,142 | | |
| Conservative | Robin Hubert Leach | 51,912 | | |
| Labour | M. Franks | 35,468 | | |
| Labour | Peter Ernest Anderson | 35,379 | | |
| Labour | Christopher Thomas Higgins | 35,141 | | |
| Labour | George Francis Palmer | 34,512 | | |
| Liberal | R. A. P. Carden | 5,201 | | |
| Liberal | E. A. Lewisohn | 4,937 | | |
| Liberal | B. Stewart-Deane | 4,753 | | |
| Liberal | S. E. Smith | 4,643 | | |
| National Front | J. E. Bean | 2,164 | | |
| National Front | B. E. Holbrook | 1,690 | | |
| National Front | G. H. Kemp | 1,665 | | |
| Union Movement | M. P. Dowton | 1,290 | | |
| Communist | H. A. Tank | 1,274 | | |
| Socialist (GB) | L. J. Cox | 1,250 | | |
| Socialist (GB) | P. L. George | 1,107 | | |
| Socialist (GB) | W. Rose | 611 | | |
| Socialist (GB) | A. Waite | 441 | | |
| Turnout | | | | |
| Conservative gain from Labour | | Swing | | |
| Conservative gain from Labour | | Swing | | |
| Conservative gain from Labour | | Swing | | |

=== 1970 election ===
The third election was held on 9 April 1970. The electorate was 217,027 and four Conservative Party councillors were elected. With 85,800 people voting, the turnout was 39.5%. The councillors were elected for a three-year term.

1970 Greater London Council election: Ealing
| Party | Candidate | Votes | % | ±% |
|---|---|---|---|---|
| Conservative | John Chaytor Dobson | 43,219 | | |
| Conservative | Michael William Walter Farrow | 43,130 | | |
| Conservative | Mark Jonathan David Damian Lister Patterson | 42,904 | | |
| Conservative | George Samuel Knatchbull Young | 41,608 | | |
| Labour | G. N. Hughes | 35,206 | | |
| Labour | P. C. Eccles | 34,983 | | |
| Labour | D. M. Mason | 34,955 | | |
| Labour | T. W. Newson | 34,299 | | |
| Liberal | E. A. Lewisohn | 3,195 | | |
| Liberal | R. W. Davies | 3,165 | | |
| Liberal | P. C. D. Hankinson | 3,026 | | |
| Liberal | A. D. Bailey | 2,804 | | |
| Homes before Roads | G. P. Foley | 2,010 | | |
| Homes before Roads | T. A. Greeves | 1,683 | | |
| Homes before Roads | A. G. St. George | 1,626 | | |
| Homes before Roads | E. M. Spence | 1,594 | | |
| Communist | H. A. Tank | 1,190 | | |
| Socialist (GB) | P. L. George | 735 | | |
| Union Movement | D. J. Wilson | 708 | | |
| Socialist (GB) | W. Buchanan | 695 | | |
| Socialist (GB) | W. Rose | 392 | | |
| Socialist (GB) | D. C. Sawyer | 293 | | |
| Turnout | | | | |
| Conservative hold | | Swing | | |
| Conservative hold | | Swing | | |
| Conservative hold | | Swing | | |
| Conservative hold | | Swing | | |
