= Brent North (electoral division) =

Electoral division in Greater London, 1973–1986

- Former electoral division for the Greater London Council
- Brent North electoral division boundaries
- District: Brent
- Electorate: 72,142 (1973); 71,268 (1977); 71,203 (1981)
- Area: 2,067 hectares (20.67 km^{2})

Former electoral division
- Created: 1973
- Abolished: 1986
- Member: 1
- Created from: Brent

Brent North was an electoral division for the purposes of elections to the Greater London Council. The constituency elected one councillor for a four-year term in 1973, 1977 and 1981, with the final term extended for an extra year ahead of the abolition of the Greater London Council.

== History ==
It was planned to use the same boundaries as the Westminster Parliament constituencies for election of councillors to the Greater London Council (GLC), as had been the practice for elections to the predecessor London County Council, but those that existed in 1965 crossed the Greater London boundary. Until new constituencies could be settled, the 32 London boroughs were used as electoral areas. The London Borough of Brent formed the Brent electoral division. This was used for the Greater London Council elections in 1964, 1967 and 1970.

The new constituencies were settled following the Second Periodic Review of Westminster constituencies and the new electoral division matched the boundaries of the Brent North parliamentary constituency.

It covered an area of 2,067 hectares (20.67 km^{2}).

== Elections ==
The Brent North constituency was used for the Greater London Council elections in 1973, 1977 and 1981. One councillor was elected at each election using first-past-the-post voting.

=== 1973 election ===
The fourth election to the GLC (and first using revised boundaries) was held on 12 April 1973. The electorate was 72,142 and one Conservative Party councillor was elected. The turnout was 42.1%. The councillor was elected for a three-year term. This was extended for an extra year in 1976 when the electoral cycle was switched to four-yearly.

1973 Greater London Council election: Brent North
Party	Candidate	Votes	%	±%
Conservative	Alan Hardy	14,941	49.22	
Labour	M. H. Rosen	10,143	33.44	
Liberal	G. Phelps	5,262	17.34	
Turnout				
Conservative win (new seat)				

=== 1977 election ===
The fifth election to the GLC (and second using revised boundaries) was held on 5 May 1977. The electorate was 71,268 and one Conservative Party councillor was elected. The turnout was 50.3%. The councillor was elected for a four-year term.

1977 Greater London Council election: Brent North
Party	Candidate	Votes	%	±%
Conservative	Alan Hardy	22,754	63.48	
Labour	Lawrence M. Nerva	9,031	25.19	
Liberal	C. F. Scofield	2,067	5.77	
National Front	G. John	1,763	4.91	
GLC Abolitionist Campaign	G. G. Fiegel	243	0.68	
Turnout				
Conservative hold		Swing		

=== 1981 election ===
The sixth and final election to the GLC (and third using revised boundaries) was held on 7 May 1981. The electorate was 71,203 and one Conservative Party councillor was elected. The turnout was 46.4%. The councillor was elected for a four-year term, extended by an extra year by the Local Government (Interim Provisions) Act 1984, ahead of the abolition of the council.

1981 Greater London Council election: Brent North
Party	Candidate	Votes	%	±%
Conservative	Alan Hardy	17,602	53.24	
Labour	Lawrence M. Nerva	11,165	33.77	
Liberal	Ann S. Arthur	4,072	12.32	
Constitutional Movement	Michael Stubbs	226	0.68	
Turnout				
Conservative hold		Swing		
