= Enfield (electoral division) =

Electoral division in Greater London, 1965–1973

- Former electoral division for the Greater London Council
- Enfield electoral division boundaries
- District: London Borough of Enfield
- Population: 265,600 (1969 estimate)
- Electorate: 194,535 (1964); 190,217 (1967); 201,300 (1970)
- Area: 20,060.0 acres (81.180 km^{2})

Former electoral division
- Created: 1965
- Abolished: 1973
- Member(s): 3
- Replaced by: Edmonton, Enfield North and Southgate

Enfield was an electoral division for the purposes of elections to the Greater London Council. The constituency elected three councillors for a three-year term in 1964, 1967 and 1970.

== History ==
It was planned to use the same boundaries as the Westminster Parliament constituencies for election of councillors to the Greater London Council (GLC), as had been the practice for elections to the predecessor London County Council, but those that existed in 1965 crossed the Greater London boundary. Until new constituencies could be settled, the 32 London boroughs were used as electoral areas which therefore created a constituency called Enfield.

The electoral division was replaced from 1973 by the single-member electoral divisions of Edmonton, Enfield North and Southgate.

== Elections ==
The Enfield constituency was used for the Greater London Council elections in 1964, 1967 and 1970. Three councillors were elected at each election using first-past-the-post voting.

=== 1964 election ===
The first election was held on 9 April 1964, a year before the council came into its powers. The electorate was 194,535 and three Conservative Party councillors were elected. With 87,772 people voting, the turnout was 45.1%. The councillors were elected for a three-year term.

1964 Greater London Council election: Enfield
Party	Candidate	Votes	%	±%
Conservative	Stanley Graham Rowlandson	37,527		
Conservative	Gordon Laurence Dixon	37,284		
Conservative	Thomas Broughton Mitcheson	36,947		
Labour	E. L. Mackenzie	36,576		
Labour	E. V. Gorton	35,260		
Labour	H. S. Newman	34,906		
Liberal	D. M. Gilbert	11,240		
Liberal	E. B. Pearce	10,782		
Liberal	R. F. Skinner	10,599		
Communist	R. A. Leeson	2,449		
Turnout				
Conservative win (new seat)				
Conservative win (new seat)				
Conservative win (new seat)				

=== 1967 election ===
The second election was held on 13 April 1967. The electorate was 190,217 and three Conservative Party councillors were elected. With 89,779 people voting, the turnout was 47.2%. The councillors were elected for a three-year term.

1967 Greater London Council election: Enfield
Party	Candidate	Votes	%	±%
Conservative	Stanley Graham Rowlandson	49,708		
Conservative	Gordon Laurence Dixon	49,426		
Conservative	Thomas Broughton Mitcheson	49,275		
Labour	B.S. Mason	27,790		
Labour	A.P. Daines	27,780		
Labour	R. L. Dubow	26,899		
Liberal	J. G. Cox	9,721		
Liberal	D. A. Coberman	8,728		
Liberal	J. P. J. Ellis	8,711		
Communist	J. A. Hiles	1,607		
Turnout				
Conservative hold		Swing		
Conservative hold		Swing		
Conservative hold		Swing		

=== 1970 election ===
The third election was held on 9 April 1970. The electorate was 201,300 and three Conservative Party councillors were elected. With 75,607 people voting, the turnout was 37.5%. The councillors were elected for a three-year term.

1970 Greater London Council election: Enfield
Party	Candidate	Votes	%	±%
Conservative	Stanley Graham Rowlandson	44,120		
Conservative	Thomas Broughton Mitcheson	43,657		
Conservative	Thomas Charles Hudson	43,332		
Labour	M. Simpson	24,815		
Labour	B. S. Mason	24,509		
Labour	A. E. Tomlinson	24,457		
Liberal	J. F. Burnett	4,380		
Liberal	D. A. Coberman	4,376		
Liberal	J. C. Buhagiar	4,059		
Communist	M. Riley	929		
Homes before Roads	M. J. Fry	705		
Homes before Roads	J. R. B. King	603		
Homes before Roads	A. J. Lyon	537		
Union Movement	S. N. Greenacre	259		
Turnout				
Conservative hold		Swing		
Conservative hold		Swing		
Conservative hold		Swing		
