= Muriel Forbes =

English politician and magistrate

Muriel Rose Forbes CBE JP (20 April 1894 – 18 April 1991) was a British Labour Party politician and magistrate.

== Early life ==
Forbes was born on 20 April 1894 to John Cheeseright. She married Charles Gilbert Forbes in 1923, with whom she had two daughters. She was educated at Gateshead Grammar School and Southlands Teacher Training College. She worked as a mathematics teacher, and would later take an interest in education policy.

== Political career ==
Forbes joined Willesden Borough Council in 1936, staying in this role until 1947. Alongside this, she was a member of Middlesex County Council from 1934 to 1965. In 1946 she was made a justice of the peace for Middlesex. She was chair of the Middlesex education committee from 1946 to 1949 and 1958 to 1959. She was elected as its chair, serving from 1960 to 1961. She was the first woman to be elected as chair of Middlesex County Council.

In 1956, she proposed a motion at a Labour Party women's conference condemning the Soviet Union's response to the Hungarian Revolution of 1956, which passed.

She was elected to the Greater London Council in 1964, serving as vice-chair for the first two years of her term, while Harold Shearman served as chair. She lost her Brent seat in 1967. She served on the governing committees of St Charles' Hospital, Paddington General Hospital and Central Middlesex Hospital. She was made an alderman of Brent London Borough Council in 1972, holding the role until 1974.

She supported Reg Freeson in the 1983 United Kingdom general election.

== Honours ==
Forbes was made a Commander of the British Empire in 1963 for services to the community. She was awarded an honorary Doctor of Technology degree from Brunel University London in 1966.
