= Brent East (electoral division) =

Electoral division in Greater London, 1973–1986

- Former electoral division for the Greater London Council
- Brent East electoral division boundaries
- District: Brent
- Electorate: 64,225 (1973); 57,041 (1977); 54,845 (1981)
- Area: 1,034 hectares (10.34 km^{2})

Former electoral division
- Created: 1973
- Abolished: 1986
- Member: 1
- Created from: Brent

Brent East was an electoral division for the purposes of elections to the Greater London Council. The constituency elected one councillor for a four-year term in 1973, 1977 and 1981, with the final term extended for an extra year ahead of the abolition of the Greater London Council.

== History ==
It was planned to use the same boundaries as the Westminster Parliament constituencies for election of councillors to the Greater London Council (GLC), as had been the practice for elections to the predecessor London County Council, but those that existed in 1965 crossed the Greater London boundary. Until new constituencies could be settled, the 32 London boroughs were used as electoral areas. The London Borough of Brent formed the Brent electoral division. This was used for the Greater London Council elections in 1964, 1967 and 1970.

The new constituencies were settled following the Second Periodic Review of Westminster constituencies and the new electoral division matched the boundaries of the Brent East parliamentary constituency.

It covered an area of 1,034 hectares (10.34 km^{2}).

== Elections ==
The Brent East constituency was used for the Greater London Council elections in 1973, 1977 and 1981. One councillor was elected at each election using first-past-the-post voting.

=== 1973 election ===
The fourth election to the GLC (and first using revised boundaries) was held on 12 April 1973. The electorate was 64,225 and one Labour Party councillor was elected. The turnout was 35.7%. The councillor was elected for a three-year term. This was extended for an extra year in 1976 when the electoral cycle was switched to four-yearly.

1973 Greater London Council election: Brent East
Party	Candidate	Votes	%	±%
Labour	Norman Howard	14,123	61.57	
Conservative	A. A. Berney	7,232	31.53	
Liberal	M. H. Habib	1,115	4.86	
Action Party for Britain First	R. J. Noble	467	2.04	
Turnout				
Labour win (new seat)				

=== 1977 election ===
The fifth election to the GLC (and second using revised boundaries) was held on 5 May 1977. The electorate was 57,041 and one Labour Party councillor was elected. The turnout was 41.0%. The councillor was elected for a four-year term.

1977 Greater London Council election: Brent East
Party	Candidate	Votes	%	±%
Labour	Norman Howard	11,005	47.09	
Conservative	Arthur R. Steel	9,377	40.12	
National Front	J. R. Davies	1,097	4.69	
Ind. Conservative	Gerard Pierre-Michel	1,025	4.39	
Liberal	William Henry Pitt	868	3.71	
Turnout				
Labour hold		Swing		

=== 1981 election ===
The sixth and final election to the GLC (and third using revised boundaries) was held on 7 May 1981. The electorate was 54,845 and one Labour Party councillor was elected. The turnout was 41.4%. The councillor was elected for a four-year term, extended by an extra year by the Local Government (Interim Provisions) Act 1984, ahead of the abolition of the council.

1981 Greater London Council election: Brent East
Party	Candidate	Votes	%	±%
Labour	Norman Howard	14,399	63.42	
Conservative	Arthur R. Steel	7,181	31.63	
Workers Revolutionary	Gerald J. Downing	434	1.91	
Ind. Conservative	Gerard Pierre-Michel	362	1.59	
Constitutional Movement	Raymond J. Marsh	328	1.44	
Turnout				
Labour hold		Swing		
