= Ealing North (electoral division) =

Electoral division in Greater London, 1973–1986

- Former electoral division for the Greater London Council
- District: Ealing
- Electorate: 73,161 (1973); 74,149 (1977); 74,981 (1981)
- Area: 2,404 hectares (24.04 km^{2})

Former electoral division
- Created: 1973
- Abolished: 1986
- Member: 1
- Created from: Ealing

Ealing North was an electoral division for the purposes of elections to the Greater London Council. The constituency elected one councillor for a four-year term in 1973, 1977 and 1981, with the final term extended for an extra year ahead of the abolition of the Greater London Council.

== History ==
It was planned to use the same boundaries as the Westminster Parliament constituencies for election of councillors to the Greater London Council (GLC), as had been the practice for elections to the predecessor London County Council, but those that existed in 1965 crossed the Greater London boundary. Until new constituencies could be settled, the 32 London boroughs were used as electoral areas. The London Borough of Ealing formed the Ealing electoral division. This was used for the Greater London Council elections in 1964, 1967 and 1970.

The new constituencies were settled following the Second Periodic Review of Westminster constituencies and the new electoral division matched the boundaries of the Ealing North parliamentary constituency.

It covered an area of 2,404 hectares (24.04 km^{2}).

== Elections ==
The Ealing North constituency was used for the Greater London Council elections in 1973, 1977 and 1981. One councillor was elected at each election using first-past-the-post voting.

=== 1973 election ===
The fourth election to the GLC (and first using revised boundaries) was held on 12 April 1973. The electorate was 73,161 and one Labour Party councillor was elected. The turnout was 47.4%. The councillor was elected for a three-year term. This was extended for an extra year in 1976 when the electoral cycle was switched to four-yearly.

1973 Greater London Council election: Ealing North
Party	Candidate	Votes	%	±%
Labour	D. M. Mason	19,013	55.31	
Conservative	M. W. W. Farrow	15,361	44.69	
Turnout				
Labour win (new seat)				

=== 1977 election ===
The fifth election to the GLC (and second using revised boundaries) was held on 5 May 1977. The electorate was 74,149 and one Conservative Party councillor was elected. The turnout was 51.7%. The councillor was elected for a four-year term.

1977 Greater London Council election: Ealing North
Party	Candidate	Votes	%	±%
Conservative	Malby S. Crofton	20,485	53.50	
Labour	P. Downham	13,303	34.71	
Liberal	J. L. Salmon	2,338	6.11	
National Front	R. J. Marsh	1,528	3.99	
National Party	T. Connolly	657	1.72	
Turnout				
Conservative gain from Labour		Swing		

=== 1981 election ===
The sixth and final election to the GLC (and third using revised boundaries) was held on 7 May 1981. The electorate was 74,981 and one Labour Party councillor was elected. The turnout was 53.0%. The councillor was elected for a four-year term, extended by an extra year by the Local Government (Interim Provisions) Act 1984, ahead of the abolition of the council.

1981 Greater London Council election: Ealing North
Party	Candidate	Votes	%	±%
Labour	Gareth J. Daniel	16,681	41.97	
Conservative	Malby S. Crofton	16,297	41.00	
Liberal	Brian R. Pollock	5,702	14.35	
NNF	James Shaw	500	1.26	
Irish National Party	Daniel P. O'Brien	235	0.59	
Independent	John A. Torrance	164	0.41	
Constitutional Movement	John A. Murphy	159	0.40	
Turnout				
Labour gain from Conservative		Swing		
