= Deptford (electoral division) =

Electoral division in Greater London, 1973–1986

- Former electoral division for the Greater London Council
- Deptford electoral division boundaries
- District: Lewisham
- Electorate: 61,632 (1973); 56,156 (1977); 55,273 (1981)
- Major settlements: Deptford
- Area: 969 hectares (9.69 km^{2})

Former electoral division
- Created: 1973
- Abolished: 1986
- Member: 1
- Created from: Lewisham

Deptford was an electoral division for the purposes of elections to the Greater London Council. The constituency elected one councillor for a four-year term in 1973, 1977 and 1981, with the final term extended for an extra year ahead of the abolition of the Greater London Council.

== History ==
It was planned to use the same boundaries as the Westminster Parliament constituencies for election of councillors to the Greater London Council (GLC), as had been the practice for elections to the predecessor London County Council, but those that existed in 1965 crossed the Greater London boundary. Until new constituencies could be settled, the 32 London boroughs were used as electoral areas. The London Borough of Lewisham formed the Lewisham electoral division. This was used for the Greater London Council elections in 1964, 1967 and 1970.

The new constituencies were settled following the Second Periodic Review of Westminster constituencies and the new electoral division matched the boundaries of the Deptford parliamentary constituency.

It covered an area of 969 hectares (9.69 km^{2}).

== Elections ==
The Deptford constituency was used for the Greater London Council elections in 1973, 1977 and 1981. One councillor was elected at each election using first-past-the-post voting.

=== 1973 election ===
The fourth election to the GLC (and first using revised boundaries) was held on 12 April 1973. The electorate was 61,632 and one Labour Party councillor was elected. The turnout was 32.0%. The councillor was elected for a three-year term. This was extended for an extra year in 1976 when the electoral cycle was switched to four-yearly.

1973 Greater London Council election: Deptford
Party	Candidate	Votes	%	±%
Labour	David Walter Chalkley	13,159	66.79	
Conservative	I. M. Andrews	4,805	24.38	
Liberal	Eric Reginald Lubbock	1,747	8.86	
Turnout				
Labour win (new seat)				

=== 1977 election ===
The fifth election to the GLC (and second using revised boundaries) was held on 5 May 1977. The electorate was 56,156 and one Labour Party councillor was elected. The turnout was 36.2%. The councillor was elected for a four-year term.

1977 Greater London Council election: Deptford
Party	Candidate	Votes	%	±%
Labour	David Walter Chalkley	9,336	45.88	
Conservative	J. R. S. Egerton	7,217	35.46	
National Party	M. L. Dixon	1,496	7.35	
National Front	Richard C. Edmonds	1,463	7.19	
Liberal	F. G. Wise	843	4.14	
Turnout				
Labour hold		Swing		

=== 1981 election ===
The sixth and final election to the GLC (and third using revised boundaries) was held on 7 May 1981. The electorate was 55,273 and one Labour Party councillor was elected. The turnout was 44.5%. The councillor was elected for a four-year term, extended by an extra year by the Local Government (Interim Provisions) Act 1984, ahead of the abolition of the council.

1981 Greater London Council election: Deptford
Party	Candidate	Votes	%	±%
Labour	Alexander Charles Mackay	11,698	47.55	
Liberal	Hilary J. Kramer	7,479	30.40	
Conservative	William A. A. Wells	4,438	18.04	
NNF	Richard C. Edmonds	487	1.98	
Ecology	Elaine A. Gibson	406	1.65	
Constitutional Movement	Trevor M. Smith	91	0.37	
Turnout				
Labour hold		Swing		
