= Hayes and Harlington (electoral division) =

Electoral division in Greater London, 1973–1986

- Former electoral division for the Greater London Council
- District: Hillingdon
- Electorate: 55,817 (1973); 55,848 (May 1977); 55,587 (Dec 1977); 56,693 (1981); 58,107 (1984)
- Major settlements: Hayes and Harlington
- Area: 3,705 hectares (37.05 km^{2})

Former electoral division
- Created: 1973
- Abolished: 1986
- Member: 1
- Created from: Hillingdon

Hayes and Harlington was an electoral division for the purposes of elections to the Greater London Council. The constituency elected one councillor for a four-year term in 1973, 1977 and 1981, with the final term extended for an extra year ahead of the abolition of the Greater London Council.

== History ==
It was planned to use the same boundaries as the Westminster Parliament constituencies for election of councillors to the Greater London Council (GLC), as had been the practice for elections to the predecessor London County Council, but those that existed in 1965 crossed the Greater London boundary. Until new constituencies could be settled, the 32 London boroughs were used as electoral areas. The London Borough of Hillingdon formed the Hillingdon electoral division. This was used for the Greater London Council elections in 1964, 1967 and 1970.

The new constituencies were settled following the Second periodic review of Westminster constituencies and the new electoral division matched the boundaries of the Hayes and Harlington parliamentary constituency.

It covered an area of 3,705 hectares (37.05 km^{2}).

== Elections ==
The Hayes and Harlington constituency was used for the Greater London Council elections in 1973, 1977 and 1981. One councillor was elected at each election using first-past-the-post voting.

=== 1973 election ===
The fourth election to the GLC (and first using revised boundaries) was held on 12 April 1973. The electorate was 55,817 and one Labour Party councillor was elected. The turnout was 38.3%. The councillor was elected for a three-year term. This was extended for an extra year in 1976 when the electoral cycle was switched to four-yearly.

1973 Greater London Council election: Hayes and Harlington
Party	Candidate	Votes	%	±%
Labour	P. F. N. Russell	13,576	63.58	
Conservative	R. G. Hughes	5,637	26.40	
National Front	J. S. Fairhurst	1,821	8.53	
Communist	P. R. Pink	317	1.49	
Turnout				
Labour win (new seat)				

=== 1977 election ===
The fifth election to the GLC (and second using revised boundaries) was held on 5 May 1977. The electorate was 55,848 and one Conservative Party councillor was elected. The turnout was 47.1%. The councillor was elected for a four-year term.

1977 Greater London Council election: Hayes and Harlington
Party	Candidate	Votes	%	±%
Conservative	Albert James Retter	12,740	48.53	
Labour	P. F. N. Russell	9,625	36.65	
Liberal	A. H. Rowland	2,077	7.91	
National Front	J. S. Fairhurst	1,410	5.37	
Communist	J. C. Mansfield	284	1.08	
National Party	F. Muter	122	0.46	
Turnout				
Conservative gain from Labour		Swing		

=== 1977 by-election ===
A by-election was held on 15 December 1977, following the death of Albert James Retter. The electorate was 55,587 and one Labour Party councillor was elected. The turnout was 24.0%.

Hayes and Harlington by-election, 1977
Party	Candidate	Votes	%	±%
Conservative	Arthur Horace Sydney Hull	6,142	46.18	
Labour	P. F. N. Russell	6,055	45.52	
National Front	Peter Marsh	585	4.39	
Liberal	A. H. Rowland	522	3.92	
Turnout				
Conservative hold		Swing		

=== 1981 election ===
The sixth and final election to the GLC (and third using revised boundaries) was held on 7 May 1981. The electorate was 56,693 and one Labour Party councillor was elected. The turnout was 44.8%. The councillor was elected for a four-year term, extended by an extra year by the Local Government (Interim Provisions) Act 1984, ahead of the abolition of the council.

1981 Greater London Council election: Hayes and Harlington
Party	Candidate	Votes	%	±%
Labour	John McDonnell	12,871	50.83	
Conservative	Arthur Horace Sydney Hull	8,525	33.67	
Liberal	Alan H. Rowland	3,628	14.33	
Communist	John C. Mansfield	299	1.18	
Turnout				
Labour gain from Conservative		Swing		

=== 1984 by-election ===
A by-election was held on 20 September 1984, following the resignation of John McDonnell. The by-election coincided with others in Edmonton, Paddington and Lewisham West.

The electorate was 58,107 and one Labour Party councillor was elected. The turnout was 28.3%.

Hayes and Harlington by-election, 1984
Party	Candidate	Votes	%	±%
Labour	John McDonnell	11,279	68.90	
Alliance	Peter F. N. Russell	4,870	29.74	
National Front	Mark T. Spong	227	1.39	
Turnout				
Labour hold		Swing		

John McDonnell was elected MP for Hayes and Harlington in 1997.
