= Lewisham East (electoral division) =

Electoral division in Greater London, 1973–1986

- Former electoral division for the Greater London Council
- District: Lewisham
- Electorate: 69,643 (1973); 67,694 (1977); 67,526 (1981)
- Area: 1,350 hectares (13.5 km^{2})

Former electoral division
- Created: 1973
- Abolished: 1986
- Member: 1
- Created from: Lewisham

Lewisham East was an electoral division for the purposes of elections to the Greater London Council. The constituency elected one councillor for a four-year term in 1973, 1977 and 1981, with the final term extended for an extra year ahead of the abolition of the Greater London Council.

== History ==
It was planned to use the same boundaries as the Westminster Parliament constituencies for election of councillors to the Greater London Council (GLC), as had been the practice for elections to the predecessor London County Council, but those that existed in 1965 crossed the Greater London boundary. Until new constituencies could be settled, the 32 London boroughs were used as electoral areas. The London Borough of Lewisham formed the Lewisham electoral division. This was used for the Greater London Council elections in 1964, 1967 and 1970.

The new constituencies were settled following the Second Periodic Review of Westminster constituencies and the new electoral division matched the boundaries of the Lewisham East parliamentary constituency.

It covered an area of 1,350 hectares (13.5 km^{2}).

== Elections ==
The Lewisham East constituency was used for the Greater London Council elections in 1973, 1977 and 1981. One councillor was elected at each election using first-past-the-post voting.

=== 1973 election ===
The fourth election to the GLC (and first using revised boundaries) was held on 12 April 1973. The electorate was 69,643 and one Labour Party councillor was elected. The turnout was 43.5%. The councillor was elected for a three-year term. This was extended for an extra year in 1976 when the electoral cycle was switched to four-yearly.

1973 Greater London Council election: Lewisham East
Party	Candidate	Votes	%	±%
Labour	John Charles Henry	16,721	55.22	
Conservative	T. M. Aitken	8,913	29.43	
Liberal	L. Spicer	4,182	13.81	
Communist	Michael Power	461	1.52	
Turnout				
Labour win (new seat)				

=== 1977 election ===
The fifth election to the GLC (and second using revised boundaries) was held on 5 May 1977. The electorate was 67,694 and one Conservative Party councillor was elected. The turnout was 45.4%. The councillor was elected for a four-year term.

1977 Greater London Council election: Lewisham East
Party	Candidate	Votes	%	±%
Conservative	Sonia Copland	13,760	44.80	
Labour	John Charles Henry	12,663	41.22	
Liberal	J. Spicer	1,923	6.26	
National Front	Michael T Ashmore	1,822	5.93	
Communist	Michael Power	365	1.19	
National Party	A. H. Whitmore	181	0.59	
Turnout				
Conservative gain from Labour		Swing		

=== 1981 election ===
The sixth and final election to the GLC (and third using revised boundaries) was held on 7 May 1981. The electorate was 67,526 and one Labour Party councillor was elected. The turnout was 46.0%. The councillor was elected for a four-year term, extended by an extra year by the Local Government (Interim Provisions) Act 1984, ahead of the abolition of the council.

1981 Greater London Council election: Lewisham East
Party	Candidate	Votes	%	±%
Labour	Paul Nigel Rossi	15,887	51.16	
Conservative	Jonathan Sayeed	10,758	34.63	
Liberal	John R. Hassall	3,005	9.68	
NNF	Stephen P. Greene	719	2.32	
Abolition of Rates	Fannie E. Saffery	272	0.88	
Communist	Michael Power	267	0.86	
Workers Revolutionary	Donovan H. S. Chapman	143	0.46	
Turnout				
Labour gain from Conservative		Swing		
