= Bexleyheath (electoral division) =

Electoral division in Greater London, 1973–1986

- Former electoral division for the Greater London Council
- Bexleyheath electoral division boundaries
- District: Bexley
- Electorate: 50,978 (1973); 50,813 (1977); 51,739 (1981)
- Major settlements: Bexleyheath
- Area: 1,380 hectares (13.8 km^{2})

Former electoral division
- Created: 1973
- Abolished: 1986
- Member: 1
- Created from: Bexley

Bexleyheath was an electoral division for the purposes of elections to the Greater London Council. The constituency elected one councillor for a four-year term in 1973, 1977 and 1981, with the final term extended for an extra year ahead of the abolition of the Greater London Council.

== History ==
It was planned to use the same boundaries as the Westminster Parliament constituencies for election of councillors to the Greater London Council (GLC), as had been the practice for elections to the predecessor London County Council, but those that existed in 1965 crossed the Greater London boundary. Until new constituencies could be settled, the 32 London boroughs were used as electoral areas. The London Borough of Bexley formed the Bexley electoral division. This was used for the Greater London Council elections in 1964, 1967 and 1970.

The new constituencies were settled following the Second Periodic Review of Westminster constituencies and the new electoral division matched the boundaries of the Bexleyheath parliamentary constituency.

It covered an area of 1,380 hectares (13.8 km^{2}).

== Elections ==
The Bexleyheath constituency was used for the Greater London Council elections in 1973, 1977 and 1981. One councillor was elected at each election using first-past-the-post voting.

=== 1973 election ===
The fourth election to the GLC (and first using revised boundaries) was held on 12 April 1973. The electorate was 50,978 and one Conservative Party councillor was elected. The turnout was 45.6%. The councillor was elected for a three-year term. This was extended for an extra year in 1976 when the electoral cycle was switched to four-yearly.

1973 Greater London Council election: Bexleyheath
Party	Candidate	Votes	%	±%
Conservative	V. R. M. Langton	10,025	43.13	
Labour	S. W. Mayne	8,924	38.40	
Liberal	W. Pickard	4,297	18.47	
Turnout		23,246	45.6	
Registered electors		50,978		
Conservative win (new seat)				

=== 1977 election ===
The fifth election to the GLC (and second using revised boundaries) was held on 5 May 1977. The electorate was 50,813 one Conservative Party councillor was elected. The turnout was 46.9%. The councillor was elected for a four-year term.

1977 Greater London Council election: Bexleyheath
Party	Candidate	Votes	%	±%
Conservative	V. R. M. Langton	13,737	57.73	▲14.6
Labour	E. M. Marsh	6,861	28.82	▼9.6
Liberal	J. H. Crowhurst	1,855	7.79	▼10.7
National Front	A. J. Wilkens	1,069	4.49	New
National Party	J. D. Turner	287	1.21	New
Turnout		23,809	46.9	+1.3
Registered electors		50,813		–165
Conservative hold		Swing	+12.1	

=== 1981 election ===
The sixth and final election to the GLC (and third using revised boundaries) was held on 7 May 1981. The electorate was 51,739 and one Conservative Party councillor was elected. The turnout was 47.5%. The councillor was elected for a four-year term, extended by an extra year by the Local Government (Interim Provisions) Act 1984, ahead of the abolition of the council.

1981 Greater London Council election: Bexleyheath
Party	Candidate	Votes	%	±%
Conservative	V. R. M. Langton	11,087	45.08	▼12.6
Labour	J. A. Dowson	8,562	34.82	▲6.0
Liberal	C. E. Wright	4,550	18.50	▲10.7
Ecology	L. A. Sturrock	389	1.58	New
Turnout		24,588	47.5	+0.6
Registered electors		51,739		+926
Conservative hold		Swing	–9.3	
