= List of Greater London Council by-elections =

This is a list of local by-elections to the Greater London Council between 1964 and 1986.

== First session ==
| By-election | Date | Incumbent | Party | Winner | Party | Cause |
|---|---|---|---|---|---|---|
| Hammersmith | 18 June 1964 | Marjorie McIntosh | Labour | Iris Mary Caroline Bonham | Labour | Death |
| Harrow | 27 January 1966 | Oliver John Galley | Conservative | Harold Trevor Mote | Conservative | Death |

== Second session ==
| By-election | Date | Incumbent | Party | Winner | Party | Cause |
|---|---|---|---|---|---|---|
| Greenwich | 29 June 1967 | Sheila Bradley | Conservative | John William Andrews | Labour | Resignation |
| Bromley | 7 November 1968 | Robert Joseph Turner | Conservative | David Anthony Harris | Conservative | Death |
| Havering | 12 December 1968 | David Thornton | Conservative | William Alfred Sibley | Conservative | Resignation |

== Third session ==
| By-election | Date | Incumbent | Party | Winner | Party | Cause |
|---|---|---|---|---|---|---|
| Kensington and Chelsea | 2 December 1971 | Seton Forbes-Cockell | Conservative | Muriel Gumbel | Conservative | Death |
| Wandsworth | 1 June 1972 | Norman George Mollett Prichard | Labour | Alexander McLaughlin | Labour | Death |
| Barnet | 19 October 1972 | Arthur Sidney Peacock | Conservative | Rita Maisie Levy | Conservative | Death |

== Fourth session ==
| By-election | Date | Incumbent | Party | Winner | Party | Cause |
|---|---|---|---|---|---|---|
| Croydon North East | 5 September 1974 | David Howard Simpson | Labour | Gladys Emma Morgan | Conservative | Previous election declared void |
| Greenwich | 24 October 1974 | Peggy Arline Middleton | Labour | Frederick William Styles | Labour | Death |
| Dagenham | 30 January 1975 | Robert John Crane | Labour | Harry Kay | Labour | Death |
| Finchley | 15 May 1975 | Jean Leslie Scott | Conservative | Roland John Michael Freeman | Conservative | Resignation |
| St Marylebone | 8 April 1976 | Arthur Desmond Herne Plummer | Conservative | Herbert Henry Sandford | Conservative | Resignation |

== Fifth session ==
| By-election | Date | Incumbent | Party | Winner | Party | Cause |
|---|---|---|---|---|---|---|
| Hayes and Harlington | 15 December 1977 | Albert James Retter | Conservative | Arthur Horace Sydney Hull | Conservative | Death |
| Holborn and St Pancras South | 8 March 1979 | Richard Collins | Labour | Charles Andrew Rossi | Labour | Death |
| Vauxhall | 21 February 1980 | Ewan Geddes Carr | Labour | Brinley Howard Davies | Labour | Death |
| Croydon Central | 20 March 1980 | Gordon William Herbert Taylor | Conservative | Robert Gurth Hughes | Conservative | Resignation |
| Croydon North East | 20 March 1980 | Gladys Emma Morgan | Conservative | Arthur James Rolfe | Conservative | Death |
| Lewisham West | 24 April 1980 | Roger Eden Hiskey | Conservative | Alan Lewis Herbert | Labour | Death |

== Sixth session ==
| By-election | Date | Incumbent | Party | Winner | Party | Cause |
|---|---|---|---|---|---|---|
| St Pancras North | 29 October 1981 | Anne Sofer | Labour | Anne Sofer | Alliance | Resigned to recontest following changing parties |
| Tottenham | 5 May 1983 | Andrew McIntosh | Labour | Jennifer Fletcher | Labour | Resignation |
| Surbiton | 15 September 1983 | Geoffrey Seaton | Conservative | Anthony Francis Arbour | Conservative | Resignation |
| Edmonton | 20 September 1984 | Kenneth Watson Little | Labour | Kenneth Watson Little | Labour | Resigned to recontest |
| Hayes and Harlington | 20 September 1984 | John McDonnell | Labour | John Martin McDonnell | Labour | Resigned to recontest |
| Lewisham West | 20 September 1984 | Alan Lewis Herbert | Labour | Alan Lewis Herbert | Labour | Resigned to recontest |
| Paddington | 20 September 1984 | Ken Livingstone | Labour | Kenneth Robert Livingstone | Labour | Resigned to recontest |
| Battersea North | 27 June 1985 | Gladys Felicia Dimson | Labour | John Vincent Norman Lucas | Labour | Resignation |
| Putney | 11 July 1985 | Andrew Phillip Harris | Labour | Margaret Anne Jenkins | Labour | Resignation |
| Romford | 11 July 1985 | Bernard Brook-Partridge | Conservative | Robert James MacGillivray Neill | Conservative | Resignation |
| Vauxhall | 11 July 1985 | Brinley Howard Davies | Labour | Michael William Tuffrey | Alliance | Resignation |

== Aldermen ==
| Date | Term ending | Incumbent | Party | Winner | Party | Cause |
|---|---|---|---|---|---|---|
| 6 July 1965 | 1967 | Donald Oliver Soper | Labour | Frederick Lionel Tonge | Labour | Resignation |
| 8 October 1968 | 1973 | Nelly Margaret Walton | Conservative | Richard Maddock Brew | Conservative | Resignation |
| 29 April 1969 | 1973 | Timothy James Bligh | Conservative | Maurice Stephenson | Conservative | Death |
| 28 April 1970 | 1973 | David Gilbert Baker | Conservative | Ewan Geddes Carr | Labour | Resignation |
| 28 April 1970 | 1973 | Brian Caldwell Cook Batsford | Conservative | Illtyd Harrington | Labour | Resignation |
| 28 April 1970 | 1973 | Christopher John Chataway | Conservative | William Watts | Labour | Resignation |
| 4 May 1971 | 1976 (extended to 1977) | Reginald Ernest Prentice | Labour | Alfred Frederick Joseph Chorley | Labour | Resignation |
| 19 October 1971 | 1973 | Timothy Charles Farmer | Labour | Bernard James Perkins | Labour | Resignation |
| 3 October 1972 | 1976 (extended to 1977) | Gerard Folliott Vaughan | Conservative | Gordon William Herbert Taylor | Conservative | Resignation |
| 21 September 1976 | 1979 (shortened to 1977) | Oliver Piers Stutchbury | Labour | David Howard Simpson | Labour | Resignation |
