= Greater London Council elections =

Local government elections in London, England

The Greater London Council was elected every three years from 1964 and every four years from 1973.

- 1964 Greater London Council election
- 1967 Greater London Council election
- 1970 Greater London Council election
- 1973 Greater London Council election (three year term extended to four)
- 1977 Greater London Council election
- 1981 Greater London Council election (four year term extended to five)

== By-elections ==
- List of Greater London Council by-elections
