= Battersea North =

Battersea North could refer to:

- Battersea North (UK Parliament constituency)
- Battersea North (London County Council constituency)
- Battersea North (electoral division), Greater London Council
