= Battersea South =

Battersea North could refer to:

- Battersea South (UK Parliament constituency)
- Battersea South (London County Council constituency)
- Battersea South (electoral division), Greater London Council
