= R (Wilson) v Prime Minister =

United Kingdom constitutional law case

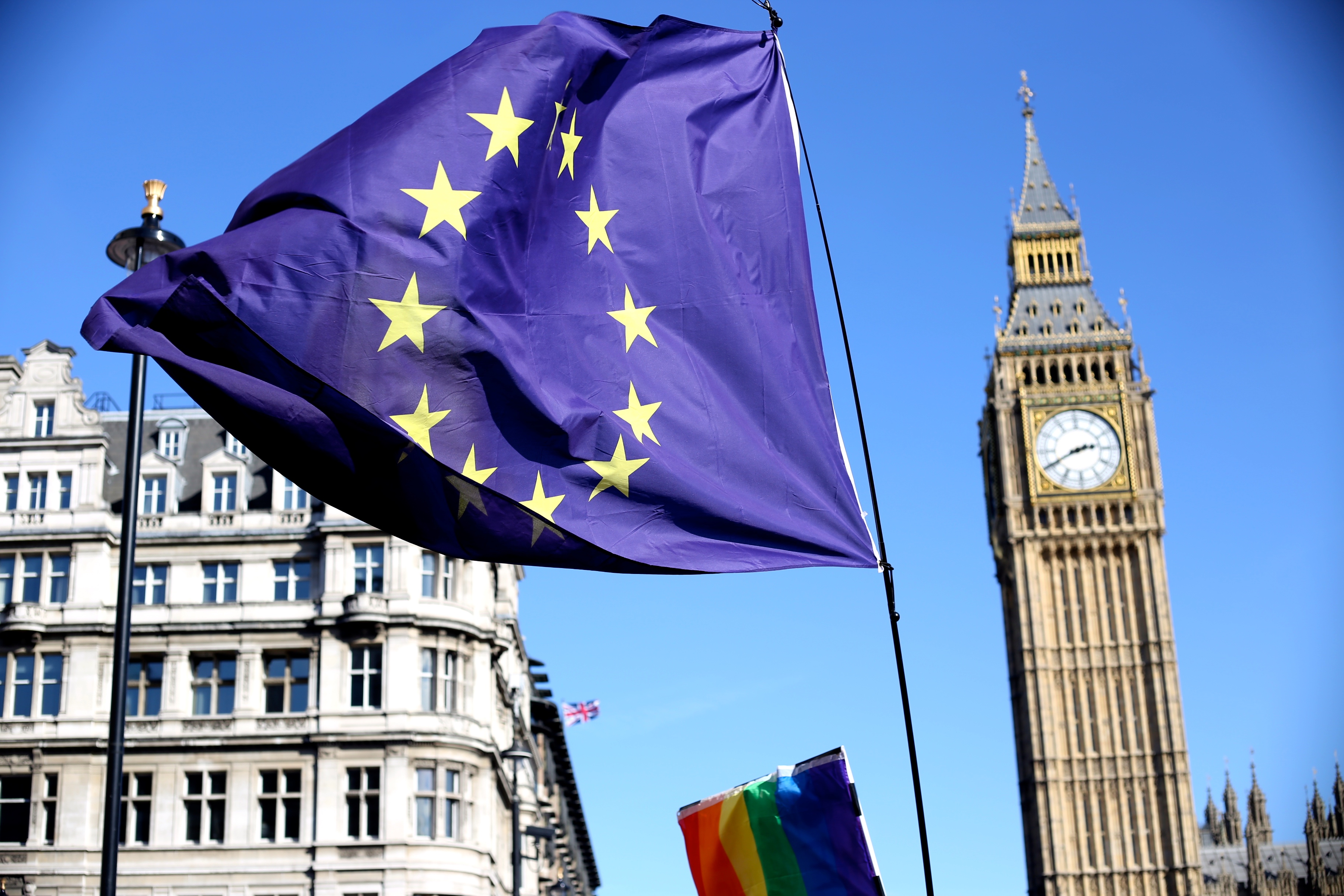
- Court: High Court, Queen’s Bench Division (Administrative Court)
- Citations: [2019] EWCA Civ 304, [2018] EWHC 3520 (Admin)

Keywords
- Judicial review, Brexit, fraud, Russia interference

R (Wilson) v Prime Minister [2019] EWCA Civ 304 is a UK constitutional law case, involving judicial review of the Brexit referendum in 2016. The claimants, including Wilson, argued that illegality through Russian interference, criminal overspending by Vote Leave and criminal investigation into the largest donor, Arron Banks, before and during the referendum undermined the integrity of the result, and rendered the decision to leave void. The application was refused in the High Court. In December 2018, the claimants lodged an appeal to the Court of Appeal. This was rejected on 21 February.

== Facts ==
Wilson and three others claimed that the Prime Minister's notice to the European Union of the United Kingdom's intention to leave under Article 50 of the Treaty on European Union was invalid because of multiple findings fraud in the conduct of the referendum. These included, first, the findings of the Electoral Commission that "Vote Leave" officials were guilty of criminal offences for overspending nearly £450,000, second, the Information Commissioner Office criminal penalty against Facebook for enabling unlawful appropriation of UK voters' personal data and use in targeted political advertising, and third, the conclusion of the House of Commons Digital, Culture, Media and Sport Committee on ‘Fake News’ that Russia had engaged in "unconventional warfare" through social media to manipulate UK voters. It was also submitted that it was relevant that the National Crime Agency was investigating Arron Banks, the largest donor to Brexit, for being unable to show that his donation came from UK sources. The claimants argued that, on the basis of Ashby v White and Morgan v Simpson that the irregularities in the vote rendered the process of the referendum unlawful at common law: the extensive fraud that had been uncovered corrupted the integrity of the vote. It followed that the decision by the prime minister, Theresa May, to notify the EU of the intention to leave was based on a flawed premise that the referendum could be said to reflect the "will of the people". The Prime Minister argued that the application for judicial review was out of time, that the problems of fraud were well known, and that the Prime Minister had not, therefore, been irrational.

== Judgment ==
=== High Court ===
Ouseley J held that the claim was unduly delayed, and further added that the basis for judicial review lacked "merit". The Court of Appeal decision in Morgan v Simpson, where Lord Denning MR held that votes must be declared void if they substantially violate the law, "relies on quite old cases" and "none of which deal with a referendum". The Venice Commission requirements for a fair question in a referendum and the European Convention on Human Rights added "nothing in this context".

50. There is no question but that time under CPR 54.5(1) runs from when grounds to make the claim arose. Time does not run from when the general public discover grounds or when they could have done so using reasonable diligence. Still less does it do so on a basis varying with the knowledge or means of knowledge of individual claimants. A time limit in relation to judicially reviewable decisions by a public body could not possibly achieve the purpose of its relative shortness if the commencement date was so variable and uncertain. The grounds here arose by the time of the certification of the referendum outcome in relation to excess or unlawful expenditure, or by the time of filing of returns in so far as the challenge relates to unlawfulness based on the content of the returns. The claimants do not provide such dates, but it is clear that they were shortly after the referendum result itself.

51. The fact that the claimants are out of time and require an extension of time plainly means that there has been undue delay for the purposes of s.31(6)(a) of the Senior Courts Act 1981, as R (Caswell) v Dairy Produce Quota Tribunal for England and Wales [1990] 2 AC 738 shows. Even if there were good reason for delay, a permission may still be refused where the grant of relief is likely to cause prejudice or to be detrimental to good public administration. So an extension of the order of two years is required to bring the claim that the referendum is vitiated, and good reason has to be shown for such an extension of time. I refuse the extension of time which is sought.

52. First, the time limits, both under the Referendum Act itself and under the RPA are short. No statutory provision contemplates anything remotely like this delay. The prejudice to others and the impact on good public administration is obvious and serious. Notice was given nine months after the outcome of the referendum and following an Act of Parliament authorising notice being given.

53. Negotiations with the EU 27 over a period of nearly two years and with the exit deadline nearing, have been undertaken at an international level plainly, with a competence, good faith, time and resources of the negotiators on both sides engaged. Arrangements for the consequences of an agreement or no agreement have been considered. Businesses, authorities and individuals, both in the UK and in the EU, have made or begun to make arrangements for the departure of the UK from the EU and have incurred expenditure in consequence.

54. It is difficult to see how Government could proceed if it had to wait before proceeding with Article 50 until the conclusion of an Electoral Commission investigation, keeping everyone, including the EU 27 on the hook whilst waiting to see what the United Kingdom was going to do, or had to wait until the conclusion of other investigations, even without allowing for appeals. Moreover, the claimants did not even move promptly after allegations surfaced about excess expenditure, co-working and return problems. It was on 2 August 2016 that Buzzfeed News, and indeed The Independent, reported that Darren Grimes had received over £625,000 from Vote Leave, reporting it with apparent incredulity. There must have been an announcement about the Electoral Commission investigation which concluded in October, and about the Commission investigation which had begun in time to conclude before 29 March 2017. None were running at the time notice was given, as I have said. The Electoral Commission started its investigation again in November 2017, and in its press notice of November 2017 referred to widespread public interest in issues concerning Vote Leave's referendum campaign expenditure.

55. On 20 March 2018 counsel for the DCMS Committee provided a legal opinion which in para.176 referred to strong evidence of offences being committed by the Leave campaign under the PPERA. On 27 March 2018, there was a debate in the House of Commons about the alleged breach of electoral law in the referendum which included reference to four hours of testimony which had previously been given before the Digital, Culture, Media and Sport Committee talking of clear evidence of systemic law breaking by Vote Leave and others; the Government response was to say that the Electoral Commission’s conclusions had to be awaited before anything was concluded. It stated that the Government would still be proceeding with the process. Even after the report by the Electoral Commission of 11 May 2018, proceedings were not commenced for more than three months.

56. The claimants have simply ignored the obligation to justify the grant of an extension of time, if they are doing so by reference to what was public knowledge and what knowledge was available. The fact that knowledge of the existence of grounds was not available, or not obtainable with reasonable diligence, may constitute good grounds for an extension of time. But that cannot be done without evidence as to the public state of knowledge on an issue as public as this. The evidence they did produce, cursory and patchy as it was, shows that there was widespread knowledge of the issue well before three months before they began these proceedings. And, indeed, they say nothing themselves about their own state of knowledge. So there is no ground for an extension of time by reference to the state of knowledge of the public or of the claimants.

57. The claimants contend that there was no undue delay because they had to wait until the Electoral Commission reports were produced before they had a case which would not be thrown out at the very outset. I do not accept that submission.

58. First, it is plain that the claimants never tried and tested the waters to see what would happen. Second, I am sceptical about such a contention when they waited more than three months after the first report. Given that delay, I would not extend time for the grounds on its own, even if they were in time in relation to the later reports. The rules in relation to undue delay may mean that some acts of public authorities are put beyond legal challenge anyway, and it is the consequential criminal or civil proceedings alone which can be pursued. Delay until satisfactory evidence is available may be a good reason for an extension in certain circumstances but it is not here, because of the prejudicial effect and the effect on good public administration. I emphasise that time does not begin to run from the moment of the discovery of what the claimants regard as sufficient evidence to proceed. I also note, as I shall come to, the nature of the evidence which the claimants clearly regard as sufficient for the purposes of pressing ground 2, as they call it.

59. It follows, in my judgment, that the claimants cannot challenge the outcome of the referendum under ground 1. If that is so, it follows as well, to my mind, that no further challenge can be brought under grounds 2 to 4 because the challenge to the referendum which was never made is an essential ingredient of the challenges under grounds 2 to 4. The referendum and it outcome must be treated as lawful even if there have been breaches of electoral law, and the criminal law, in the process.

60. However, even if time ran from the giving of the notice on 29 March 2017 for grounds 3 and 4, that is still over 16 months before the start of proceedings. The problems in the way of an extension of time in relation to public or personal knowledge are not altered. The prejudice to individuals and bodies and the harm to good administration are still just as potent, and I would refuse an extension of time even if that were where the time began to run.

...

64 I shall, however, say a few words in relation to the merits. I do not regard it as an unarguable proposition that a challenge to the referendum could have been launched on common law grounds. There is no provision for the common law being saved but there is no express exclusion of it either, and no statutory alternative exists. The fact that the statutory challenge grounds are limited to ballots counted and votes cast does not necessarily and unarguably of itself lead to the conclusion that the common law is excluded in all respects.

65 However, the common law would probably have to draw the line differently from that drawn by the Representation of the People Act because the RPA is not incorporated and deliberately not incorporated, and because this case deals with a referendum and not constituency based elections. It is striking that if Parliament had meant the common law to operate as a substitute for the RPA, that it did not say so and incorporate the RPA with adjustments to its language instead. But that it plainly did not do. However, whatever the arguable role of the common law might be, I consider it hugely improbable, to the extent of being unarguable, that the common law would in those circumstances operate so as to void a referendum on the basis upon which the RPA would void a constituency election, even if the electoral offences are equivalent to corrupt and illegal practices which under the RPA would have had that effect.

66 This is because, as I have indicated, such an approach would be in reality to incorporate the RPA and incorporate it for a referendum when Parliament has not done so. And it is obvious that the common law developed in relation to constituency or ward based elections is inapplicable without adjustment to a nationwide referendum. The decision in Morgan v Simpson [1974] 1 QB 151, which sets out the common law, relies on quite old cases, understandably in view of statutory interventions between them, but obviously none of which deal with a referendum, and which draw a distinction at para.164 E-H between acts which vitiate and acts which do not vitiate a result. Moohan v The Lord Advocate [2014] UKSC 67, [2015] AC 901 concerned the right of prisoners to vote in the Scottish independence referendum. The common law did not give a right to vote to them. The conclusion of Lord Hodge was that the right to vote was a fundamental or constitutional right but it was a right controlled by statute controlling "the modalities of the expression of democracy. It is not appropriate for the courts to develop the common law in order to supplement or override the statutory rules..."

67 If the common law is not excluded, though I think it exceeding unlikely but arguable, the extent to which the common law is operative is unclear. It is obviously that there are political issues that would be extremely difficult to be brought before the court. It is difficult to see that one would be able to substitute without some adaptation the terms of the RPA. But, in my judgment, were the common law to have a role to play in relation to avoiding elections or referenda because of an absence of statutory provision, the common law would require there to be some effect upon the outcome of the referendum no less demanding than, by way of example, soundly based grounds for believing that the outcome would have been different had the illegal acts not taken place. There is, however, no such evidence....

68 In the upshot, it is my judgment that it is very unlikely that the common law did survive to play a role in vitiating the referendum, but if it did it would only do so where there was sound evidence for believing that the outcome would have been different without that unlawfulness.... This is a very difficult and contentious task which could itself reinforce the view that the common law did not intervene in these circumstances, leaving it to Parliament to evaluate all that in deciding what to do. These allegations have been around for a long time. Parliament decided to enact the authority required for Article 50 without imposing any conditions.

...

76 Article 3 of Protocol 1 to the ECHR adds nothing in this context, nor does the thinking of

the Venice Commission.

=== Court of Appeal ===
The Court of Appeal of two judges rejected an appeal from Ouseley J's refusal to allow permission on 21 February, holding that the claim was both out of time and lacked merit, and it further refused to appeal to the Supreme Court. Its written judgment was reserved, and did not give reasons at the oral hearing for its decision.

== See also ==
- UK constitutional law
- Russian interference in the 2016 Brexit referendum
