= St Pancras North =

St Pancras North could refer to:

- St Pancras North (UK Parliament constituency)
- St Pancras North (electoral division), Greater London Council
- St Pancras North (London County Council constituency)
