= Croydon South =

Croydon South could refer to

- Croydon South, Victoria, Australia, a suburb of Melbourne
- Croydon South (UK Parliament constituency)
- Croydon South (electoral division), Greater London Council

== See also ==
- South Croydon
