= Tooting (electoral division) =

Electoral division in Greater London, 1973–1986

- Former electoral division for the Greater London Council
- District: Wandsworth
- Electorate: 54,088 (1973); 51,563 (1977); 50,769 (1981)
- Area: 780 hectares (7.8 km^{2})

Former electoral division
- Created: 1973
- Abolished: 1986
- Member: 1
- Created from: Wandsworth

Tooting was an electoral division for the purposes of elections to the Greater London Council. The constituency elected one councillor for a four-year term in 1973, 1977 and 1981, with the final term extended for an extra year ahead of the abolition of the Greater London Council.

== History ==
It was planned to use the same boundaries as the Westminster Parliament constituencies for election of councillors to the Greater London Council (GLC), as had been the practice for elections to the predecessor London County Council, but those that existed in 1965 crossed the Greater London boundary. Until new constituencies could be settled, the 32 London boroughs were used as electoral areas. The London Borough of Wandsworth formed the Wandsworth electoral division. This was used for the Greater London Council elections in 1964, 1967 and 1970.

The new constituencies were settled following the Second Periodic Review of Westminster constituencies and the new electoral division matched the boundaries of the Tooting parliamentary constituency.

It covered an area of 780 hectares (7.8 km^{2}).

== Elections ==
The Tooting constituency was used for the Greater London Council elections in 1973, 1977 and 1981. One councillor was elected at each election using first-past-the-post voting.

=== 1973 election ===
The fourth election to the GLC (and first using revised boundaries) was held on 12 April 1973. The electorate was 54,088 and one Labour Party councillor was elected. The turnout was 33.9%. The councillor was elected for a three-year term. This was extended for an extra year in 1976 when the electoral cycle was switched to four-yearly.

1973 Greater London Council election: Tooting
Party	Candidate	Votes	%	±%
Labour	Lilias Girdwood Gillies	11,783	64.20	
Conservative	N. R. Berry	6,162	33.58	
Communist	R. E. Lewis	417	2.27	
Turnout				
Labour win (new seat)				

=== 1977 election ===
The fifth election to the GLC (and second using revised boundaries) was held on 5 May 1977. The electorate was 51,563 and one Conservative Party councillor was elected. The turnout was 39.5%. The councillor was elected for a four-year term.

1977 Greater London Council election: Tooting
Party	Candidate	Votes	%	±%
Conservative	Thomas Alfred Leefe Ham	9,787	48.04	
Labour	Lilias Girdwood Gillies	8,426	41.37	
Liberal	R. I. M. Fife	1,058	5.19	
National Front	D. L. Simons	791	3.88	
Communist	R. E. Lewis	319	1.56	
Turnout				
Conservative gain from Labour		Swing		

=== 1981 election ===
The sixth and final election to the GLC (and third using revised boundaries) was held on 7 May 1981. The electorate was 50,769 and one Labour and Co-operative Party councillor was elected. The turnout was 45.0%. The councillor was elected for a four-year term, extended by an extra year by the Local Government (Interim Provisions) Act 1984, ahead of the abolition of the council.

1981 Greater London Council election: Tooting
Party	Candidate	Votes	%	±%
Labour Co-op	Anthony Louis Banks	12,127	53.05	
Conservative	Thomas Alfred Leefe Ham	7,268	31.79	
Liberal	Ian D. Mason	2,278	9.97	
National Front	Peter Berbridge	443	1.94	
Ecology	Donald J. Valentine	314	1.37	
Communist	Robert E. Lewis	281	1.23	
Workers Party	Adrian L. Greeman	145	0.63	
Turnout				
Labour gain from Conservative		Swing		
