= Bernard Brook-Partridge =

British politician

Councillor on St Pancras Metropolitan Borough Council for No. 1 Ward
- In office 1959–1963

Councillor on Greater London Council for Romford Havering (1967–1973)
- In office 1967–1985

Chairman of the Greater London Council
- In office 1980–1981

Personal details
- Born: 1927
- Died: 2018
- Party: Conservative

Bernard Brook-Partridge was a politician in London.

== Political career ==
At the 1958 London County Council election, Brook-Partridge unsuccessfully stood in St Pancras North. He was elected a councillor for Ward No. 1 (Highgate area) on St Pancras Borough Council in the 1959 London local elections. He held the seat until 1962.

He was elected to represent Havering on the Greater London Council (GLC) in 1967 and was returned at the election in 1970. He represented the replacement seat of Romford from 1973 and was re-elected in 1977 and 1981.

In January 1974, Brook-Partridge resigned from the GLC film viewing board, which had the power to censor films that were not certified for general release by the British Board of Film Censors. He said he felt he was being "corrupted" by the films he had reviewed.

He was the Conservative Party candidate for Nottingham Central at the 1970 general election.

In May 1977, Brook-Partridge became chairman of the council arts committee. In this role he attempted to close down Soho sex cinemas by refusing licenses. He threatened smaller and experimental arts organisations with the removal of their grants. £1,800,000 of the £2,100,000 arts grant budget for 1977/1978 went to four large established bodies. (Note: They were the National Theatre, the London Orchestral Concert Board, the London Festival Ballet and the English National Opera.) He was moved away from the arts brief in May 1978.

He was chairman of the public services and safety committee from May 1978. Part of the job was to oversee the construction of the Thames Barrier. He resigned as committee chairman in February 1979 after disclosing to a journalist information about the project that the GLC leader Horace Cutler had not yet reported to the UK government.

He was chairman of the GLC for the 1980/1981 municipal year. He was one of the Conservative GLC members who opposed abolition of the council against the policy of the UK government. He resigned from the GLC in 1985.

== Punk music ==
In a television interview Brook-Partridge said of punk music, "Most of these groups would be vastly improved by sudden death. The worst of the punk rock groups I suppose currently are the Sex Pistols. They are unbelievably nauseating ... the antithesis of humankind. I would like to see somebody dig a very, very large, exceedingly deep hole and drop the whole bloody lot down it."

== Notes ==
Civic offices
Preceded by Robert Vigars	Chairman of the Greater London Council; 1980–1981	Succeeded by John Ward
