= Duncan Ouseley =

British judge (born 1950)

Sir Duncan Brian Walter Ouseley (born 24 February 1950), styled The Hon. Mr Justice Ouseley, is a retired High Court judge in England and Wales, Queen's Bench Division. He is notable for involvement in many legal cases reported in law reports and the British press.

== Early life ==
The only son of Maurice Henry Ouseley and his wife Margaret Helen Irene Vagts, the young Ouseley was educated at Trinity School of John Whitgift, Croydon, Fitzwilliam College, Cambridge, where he graduated BA in 1971, and then at University College London, where he gained the degree of LLM. He was awarded the Oxford MA by seniority in 1975.

== Career ==
Ouseley was called to the Bar in 1973, and became a Queen's Counsel in 1992. He was appointed a Recorder in 1994 and a Bencher in 2000.

In 1992, as a Queen's Counsel, Ouseley represented the Chief Adjudication Officer for Social Security Administration.

In 2000, Ouseley was appointed as a judge of the Queen’s Bench Division and was knighted, remaining in office until he retired in May 2019. He was Chairman of the Special Immigration Appeal Commission from 2003 to 2006 and President of the Immigration Appeal Tribunal from 2003 to 2005. He was Lead Judge of the Administrative Court from 2010 to 2015.

== Notable cases as judge ==
Ouseley’s judgments have included rejecting appeals by suspected international terrorists against indefinite detention; a view overturned in 2004, when the House of Lords ruled that it violates the Human Rights Act and the European Convention on Human Rights.

In 2002, in the case Theakston v Mirror Group Newspapers Ltd, the television presenter Jamie Theakston sought an injunction against The Sunday People claiming publication of details of his visit to a brothel infringed his right to privacy under Article 8 of the European Convention on Human Rights. Refusing to impose the injunction, Ouseley ruled "It is not inherent in the nature of a brothel that all or anything that transpires within is confidential.

In February 2012, an atheist councillor and the National Secular Society took Bideford Town Council to the English High Court to challenge the saying of prayers at council meetings. Ouseley ruled that the town council was acting unlawfully, citing the Local Government Act 1972, and ordered that prayers should stop. This decision affects all councils in England and Wales. The ruling was welcomed by the British Humanist Association, but was criticised by Christians, religious groups, and bishops, who felt Christianity was being "marginalised", or was "under attack" in the United Kingdom.

In October 2015, in Transport for London v Uber London Ltd [2015] EWHC 2918 (Admin), Transport for London took Uber, the Licensed Taxi Drivers Association, and the Licensed Private Car Hire Association to the High Court of Justice to receive clarification about whether Uber fell within section 11 of the Private Hire Vehicles (London) Act 1998 and was therefore operating unlawfully. Ouseley ruled that "A taximeter, for the purposes of Section 11 of the Private Hire Vehicles (London) Act 1998, does not include a device that receives GPS signals in the course of a journey, and forwards GPS data to a server located outside of the vehicle, which server calculates a fare that is partially or wholly determined by reference to distance travelled and time taken, and sends the fare information back to the device." Thereby ruling that Uber did not fall foul of the Private Hire Vehicles (London) Act 1998 and was therefore lawful.

Ouseley was the judge in the case of Dr Bawa-Garba in 2017. Despite considerable failings at her hospital on the day Jack Adcock died, such as short staffing and computer system malfunction, Dr Bawa-Garba was charged with manslaughter by gross negligence and was struck off the medical register. She successfully appealed that decision in the Court of Appeal, which upheld her appeal on 13 August 2019.

In HJ Banks & Co Ltd v Secretary of State for Housing and Local Government [2018] EWHC 3141 (Admin) Ouseley overturned the refusal of a coal mine on the ground that not enough justifications were given for how renewable energy could replace coal.

In R (Wilson) v Prime Minister [2018] EWHC 3520 (Admin), a challenge to the outcome of the 2016 United Kingdom European Union membership referendum, Ouseley found that the claim was unduly delayed and that the basis for judicial review lacked merit. The applicant relied on old cases, "none of which deal with a referendum". The Venice Commission requirements for a fair question in a referendum and the European Convention on Human Rights added "nothing in this context". This was later upheld in the Court of Appeal.

== Personal life ==
In 1974, Ouseley married Suzannah Price. They had three sons.

His father died in 1978 and his mother in 1997.
