= Shelagh Roberts =

British politician

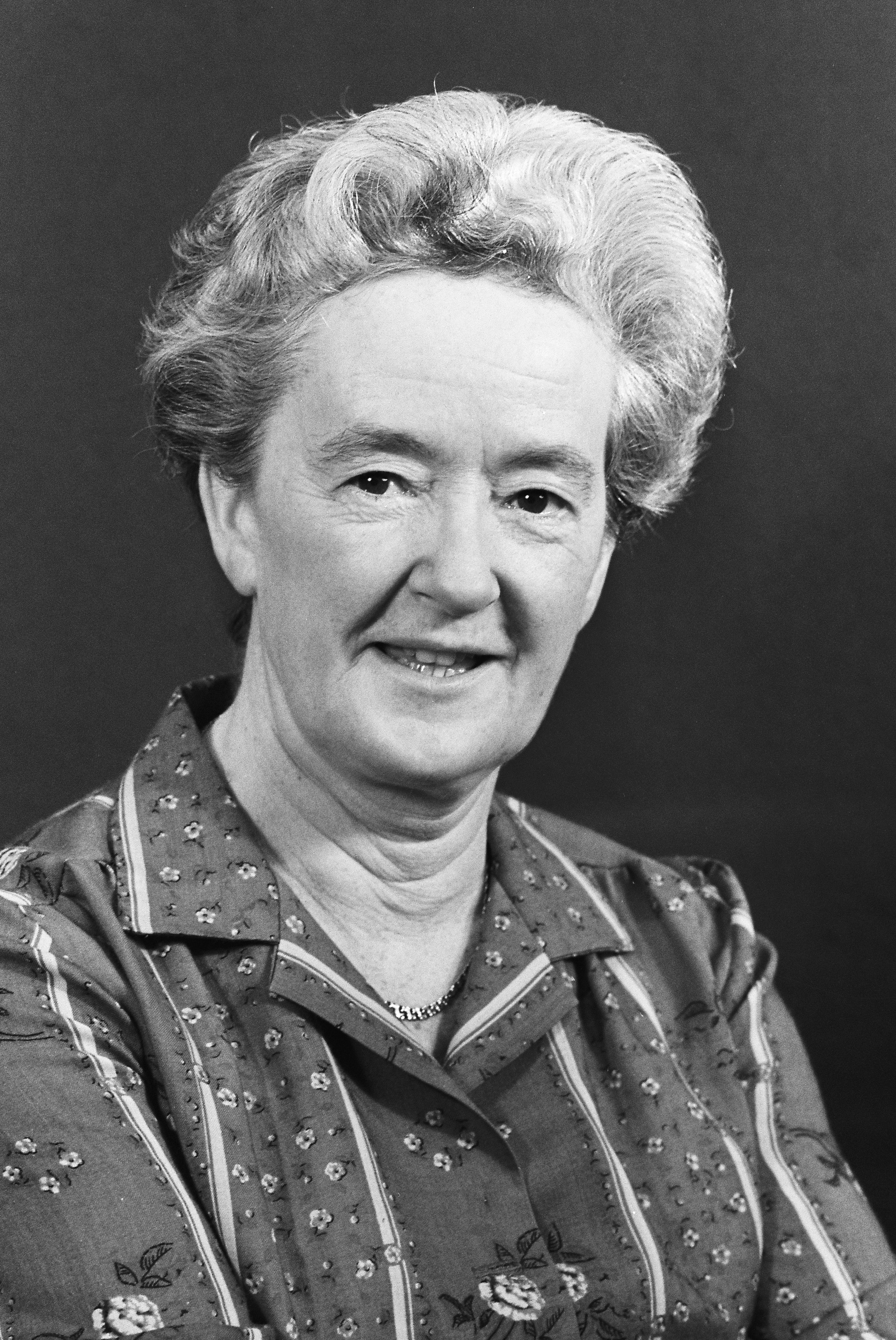
Shelagh Roberts

Dame Shelagh Marjorie Roberts DBE (13 October 1924 – 16 January 1992) was a British Conservative party politician who served on the Greater London Council from 1970–81 and represented London South West in the European Parliament from 1979–89.

Her service in the European Parliament was briefly interrupted in 1979 when it was discovered that she held an office of profit under the Crown and was disqualified from serving. She then resigned the office of profit, and was re-elected as an MEP a few months later. After failing to be re-elected to the European Parliament in 1989 she was made Chairman of the London Tourist Board, serving until her death. It was announced on 31 December 1991 that she was to be created a life peer, but she died before this process could be completed.

== Early life ==
Roberts was born in Port Talbot, Wales on 13 October 1924 and was educated at Milford Haven County School, Ystalyfera School and then St. Wyburn School at Birkdale. After leaving school she started work with the Inland Revenue in Liverpool.

== Politics ==
In 1964 Roberts was a general election candidate for Caernarfon, but was heavily defeated by the incumbent Goronwy Roberts, then a Minister of State in the Labour government.

Roberts was a member of Kensington Borough Council from 1953 to 1971 and of the Greater London Council for Havering from 1970 to 1973 and Upminster from 1973 to 1981. In 1981 she was appointed a Dame Commander of the Order of the British Empire for her political work. She was a member of Port of London Authority, Basildon Development Corporation and the Race Relations Board, and in October 1989 was appointed chairman of the London Tourist Board.

== Europe ==
In 1979, in the first direct elections to the European Parliament, Roberts became a member of the European Parliament (MEP) representing London South West. When it was discovered that she was a member of the Occupational Pensions Board, for which she received a small salary from the Crown, her election as an MEP was declared invalid. She resigned from the Board and was elected again to the European Parliament. She lost her seat to Labour in 1989.

== Life Peer ==
In recognition of her political work, she was appointed a Life Peer in the 1992 New Year Honours, but died from cancer on 16 January 1992, aged 67, before she could take her seat in the House of Lords, and the peerage became a Ghost Honour. Roberts had never married.

== Links ==
- Profile, qub.ac.uk; accessed 15 May 2016.
