= Co-operative Correspondence Club =

UK magazine

The Cooperative Correspondence Club (CCC) was a group of approximately twenty-four women, living all over the United Kingdom, who wrote to each other in the form of a private correspondence magazine from 1936 to 1990.

== Origin ==
The CCC began in 1935 after one woman, writing under the pen name "Ubique," wrote the following cry for help into the motherhood magazine the Nursery World. “Can any mother help me? I live a very lonely life as I have no near neighbours. I cannot afford to buy a wireless . . . I get so down and depressed after the children are in bed and I am alone in the house . . . Can any reader suggest an occupation that will intrigue me and exclude "thinking" and cost nothing! A hard problem I admit."

Mothers from all over the country replied to Ubique’s letter, expressing that they too were struggling with similar feelings of boredom and loneliness. The women suggested that, as a way to combat this, they write to one another. So many women replied that they decided to write in the form of a correspondence magazine so that everyone could be included.

== Background ==
At the time that the women of the CCC came together, marriage bars were in place which meant that women in public service jobs were no longer legally allowed to work once they were married. Alongside this was enormous societal pressure for women to be in the home and to spend their time working hard to be “ideal” housewives and mothers. Strict housekeeping and childrearing regimes were the norm. Typical days were filled by maintaining the household and religiously following the rules outlined by the childrearing expert of the time, Truby King, whose practices are seen as quite severe in modern times.

This was also a difficult time for middle-class women in the UK because they were the first generation who chose to move away from their family homes to start their married life. Although this was their preference, it meant that the women did not have their mothers or grandmothers near them (as previous generations had) so they had limited support with raising their families. All of these circumstances resulted in many well educated, bright women, like those in the CCC, who were relegated to the home feeling generally dissatisfied and lacking intellectual stimulation and adult companionship.

== CCC Magazine ==
=== Distribution and circulation ===
When they got together in 1935, every member of the CCC agreed to write an article, fortnightly, using a nom de plume, and mail it to the editor, who would compile all of the contributions and hand-stitch them together in a decorative linen cover. There was only one copy of each edition of the magazine. The editor would mail the completed magazine to the first woman on a pre-arranged list, who had a set amount of time to read it and to respond to the articles by commenting directly on the pages. That member would forward it on to the next woman, and so on, until every person had received the magazine.

The same group of women did this twice a month for 54 years until only seven of the women were still writing. Throughout this entire time, the women fiercely upheld the rule that the magazine would be written exclusively for, and read exclusively by, the members of the club.

=== Membership ===
The one commonality amongst the women in the CCC was that they were all mothers. Other than that, they were a diverse group of women. In fact, diversity was a requirement for new members to the club because the magazine was intended to be a place to discuss and debate, and the women wanted members who would be able to challenge one another and teach each other about different lifestyles and ideas. The club therefore consisted of soldiers’ wives and conscientious objectors’ wives, liberals, conservatives and communists, women of different faiths, communities, and educational backgrounds.

The women also ranged across the middle class, with some of the women coming from working-class families and at least one member whose family considered themselves a part of the aristocracy. As a further example of how keen they were to bring in different types of women, in 1938, after some women in the group made anti-Semitic remarks, they specifically recruited a Jewish woman to join the club.

=== Pseudonyms ===
Every woman in the CCC chose a pen name when they joined the group. These names did not hide the women's identities because they all had to know each other's real names in order to send the magazine along in the post. However, it was a way for the women to represent themselves in the magazine. Elektra (Rose Hacker), for example, chose her pen name because she “was madly in love with her father.” Cotton Goods chose her pseudonym because she was from Lancashire and all of her family was in the cotton industry. The CCC also included the writer Elaine Morgan (writer).
