= Croydon (electoral division) =

Electoral division in Greater London, 1965–1973

- Former electoral division for the Greater London Council
- Croydon electoral division boundaries from 1969 to 1973
- District: London Borough of Croydon
- Population: 327,130 (1969 estimate)
- Electorate: 224,135 (1964); 222,385 (1967); 241,110 (1970)
- Area: 21,395.0 acres (86.582 km^{2})

Former electoral division
- Created: 1965
- Abolished: 1973
- Member: 4
- Replaced by: Croydon Central, Croydon North East, Croydon North West and Croydon South

Croydon was an electoral division for the purposes of elections to the Greater London Council. The constituency elected four councillors for a three-year term in 1964, 1967 and 1970.

== History ==
It was planned to use the same boundaries as the Westminster Parliament constituencies for election of councillors to the Greater London Council (GLC), as had been the practice for elections to the predecessor London County Council, but those that existed in 1965 crossed the Greater London boundary. Until new constituencies could be settled, the 32 London boroughs were used as electoral areas which therefore created a constituency called Croydon.

The boundaries of the electoral division were adjusted on 1 April 1969.

The electoral division was replaced from 1973 by the single-member electoral divisions of Croydon Central, Croydon North East, Croydon North West and Croydon South.

== Elections ==
The Croydon constituency was used for the Greater London Council elections in 1964, 1967 and 1970. Four councillors were elected at each election using first-past-the-post voting.

=== 1964 election ===
The first election was held on 9 April 1964, a year before the council came into its powers. The electorate was 224,135 and four Conservative Party councillors were elected. With 105,514 people voting, the turnout was 47.1%. The councillors were elected for a three-year term.

1964 Greater London Council election: Croydon
Party	Candidate	Votes	%	±%
Conservative	John Leonard Aston	57,625		
Conservative	Geoffrey Weston Aplin	57,237		
Conservative	Paul Alexander Saunders	53,828		
Conservative	Keith Andrew Edwards	50,866		
Labour	Arthur G. Edwards	34,927		
Labour	F. T. Cole	31,840		
Labour	J. A. Clinch	28,957		
Labour	S. Sutcliffe	27,752		
Liberal	R. E. J. Banks	13,445		
Liberal	Mrs. B. M. Bashford	12,731		
Liberal	L. G. Pine	10,398		
Liberal	R. F. Tapsell	10,112		
Communist	M. Rapaport	3,498		
Independent	S. B. Stray	2,998		
Independent	Jesse T. E. A. Waddell	2,578		
Turnout				
Conservative win (new seat)				
Conservative win (new seat)				
Conservative win (new seat)				
Conservative win (new seat)				

=== 1967 election ===
The second election was held on 13 April 1967. The electorate was 222,835 and four Conservative Party councillors were elected. With 91,212 people voting, the turnout was 41.0%. The councillors were elected for a three-year term.

1967 Greater London Council election: Croydon
Party	Candidate	Votes	%	±%
Conservative	John Leonard Aston	62,116		
Conservative	Geoffrey Weston Aplin	61,627		
Conservative	Stephen James Stewart	59,652		
Conservative	Miss Gladys Emma Morgan	59,385		
Labour	F. T. Cole	16,264		
Labour	V. Burgos	15,990		
Labour	A. G. Edwards	15,613		
Labour	J. A. Clinch	14,712		
Liberal	K. H. Legge	8,674		
Liberal	M. A. Green	8,048		
Liberal	M. E. Thomas	7,847		
Liberal	H. A. Rivers	7,685		
National Union of Council Tenants	Mrs. M. V. Barnet	2,984		
Communist	Dr. M. Rapoport	1,999		
National Union of Council Tenants	W. J. Debenham	1,977		
National Union of Council Tenants	Mrs. C. A. Field	1,596		
Independent	J. T. E. A. Waddell	1,411		
Independent	S. B. Stray	1,358		
National Union of Council Tenants	R. G. Field	1,352		
Turnout				
Conservative hold		Swing		
Conservative hold		Swing		
Conservative hold		Swing		
Conservative hold		Swing		

=== 1970 election ===
The third election was held on 9 April 1970. The electorate was 241,110 and four Conservative Party councillors were elected. With 86,889 people voting, the turnout was 36.0%. The councillors were elected for a three-year term.

1970 Greater London Council election: Croydon
Party	Candidate	Votes	%	±%
Conservative	Vivian Bendall	56,478		
Conservative	Miss Gladys Emma Morgan	56,441		
Conservative	Stephen James Stewart	56,182		
Conservative	Geoffrey Weston Aplin	51,194		
Labour	F. T. Cole	19,915		
Labour	V. Burgos	19,854		
Labour	J. M. Bloom	19,844		
Labour	A. G. Edwards	19,661		
Liberal	Mrs. B. M. Bashford	7,312		
Liberal	G. A. Davidson	5,681		
Liberal	A. F. Reeves	5,630		
Liberal	H. A. Rivers	5,386		
Homes before Roads	Mrs. B. Brittian	1,895		
Homes before Roads	P. A. Brittian	1,816		
Homes before Roads	L. G. Coat	1,807		
Homes before Roads	G. Druce	1,579		
Communist	Mrs. A. Waddell	1,144		
Independent	S. B. Stray	682		
Union Movement	D. Godfrey	417		
Turnout				
Conservative hold		Swing		
Conservative hold		Swing		
Conservative hold		Swing		
Conservative hold		Swing		
