= Croydon North West (electoral division) =

Electoral division in Greater London, 1973–1986

- Former electoral division for the Greater London Council
- Croydon North West electoral division boundaries
- District: Croydon
- Electorate: 55,312 (1973); 55,002 (1977); 54,704 (1981)
- Area: 1,098 hectares (10.98 km^{2})

Former electoral division
- Created: 1973
- Abolished: 1986
- Member: 1
- Created from: Croydon

Croydon North West was an electoral division for the purposes of elections to the Greater London Council. The constituency elected one councillor for a four-year term in 1973, 1977 and 1981, with the final term extended for an extra year ahead of the abolition of the Greater London Council.

== History ==
It was planned to use the same boundaries as the Westminster Parliament constituencies for election of councillors to the Greater London Council (GLC), as had been the practice for elections to the predecessor London County Council, but those that existed in 1965 crossed the Greater London boundary. Until new constituencies could be settled, the 32 London boroughs were used as electoral areas. The London Borough of Croydon formed the Croydon electoral division. This was used for the Greater London Council elections in 1964, 1967 and 1970.

The new constituencies were settled following the Second Periodic Review of Westminster constituencies and the new electoral division matched the boundaries of the Croydon North West parliamentary constituency.

It covered an area of 1,098 hectares (10.98 km^{2}).

== Elections ==
The Croydon North West constituency was used for the Greater London Council elections in 1973, 1977 and 1981. One councillor was elected at each election using first-past-the-post voting.

=== 1973 election ===
The fourth election to the GLC (and first using revised boundaries) was held on 12 April 1973. The electorate was 55,312 and one Labour Party councillor was elected. The turnout was 38.9%. The councillor was elected for a three-year term. This was extended for an extra year in 1976 when the electoral cycle was switched to four-yearly.

1973 Greater London Council election: Croydon North West
Party	Candidate	Votes	%	±%
Labour	Dudley Eric Reynolds Barker	9,458	43.99	
Conservative	Stephen James Stewart	8,965	41.71	
Liberal	Leo C. E. Held	3,074	14.30	
Turnout				
Labour win (new seat)				

=== 1977 election ===
The fifth election to the GLC (and second using revised boundaries) was held on 5 May 1977. The electorate was 55,002 and one Conservative Party councillor was elected. The turnout was 41.1%. The councillor was elected for a four-year term.

1977 Greater London Council election: Croydon North West
Party	Candidate	Votes	%	±%
Conservative	Stephen James Stewart	13,668	60.54	
Labour	A. M. Simpson	6,479	28.65	
Liberal	Janet R. Pitt	1,575	6.96	
National Front	P. J. Weedon	604	2.67	
National Party	T. Lamb	206	0.91	
GLC Abolitionist Campaign	D. P. Furderer	67	0.30	
Turnout				
Conservative gain from Labour		Swing		

=== 1981 election ===
The sixth and final election to the GLC (and third using revised boundaries) was held on 7 May 1981. The electorate was 54,704 and one Conservative Party councillor was elected. The turnout was 44.3%. The councillor was elected for a four-year term, extended by an extra year by the Local Government (Interim Provisions) Act 1984, ahead of the abolition of the council.

1981 Greater London Council election: Croydon North West
Party	Candidate	Votes	%	±%
Conservative	Stephen James Stewart	10,891	44.93	
Labour	Mary M. Walker	10,072	41.55	
Liberal	William Henry Pitt	2,878	11.88	
National Front	Keith E. J. Martin	395	1.63	
Turnout				
Conservative hold		Swing		
