= Upminster (electoral division) =

Electoral division in Greater London, 1973–1986

- Former electoral division for the Greater London Council
- Upminster electoral division boundaries
- District: Havering
- Electorate: 63,922 (1973); 64,627 (1977); 66,127 (1981)
- Major settlements: Upminster
- Area: 5,679 hectares (56.79 km^{2})

Former electoral division
- Created: 1973
- Abolished: 1986
- Member: 1
- Created from: Havering

Upminster was an electoral division for the purposes of elections to the Greater London Council. The constituency elected one councillor for a four-year term in 1973, 1977 and 1981, with the final term extended for an extra year ahead of the abolition of the Greater London Council.

== History ==
It was planned to use the same boundaries as the Westminster Parliament constituencies for election of councillors to the Greater London Council (GLC), as had been the practice for elections to the predecessor London County Council, but those that existed in 1965 crossed the Greater London boundary. Until new constituencies could be settled, the 32 London boroughs were used as electoral areas. The London Borough of Havering formed the Havering electoral division. This was used for the Greater London Council elections in 1964, 1967 and 1970.

The new constituencies were settled following the Second Periodic Review of Westminster constituencies and the new electoral division matched the boundaries of the Upminster parliamentary constituency.

It covered an area of 5,679 hectares (56.79 km^{2}).

== Elections ==
The Upminster constituency was used for the Greater London Council elections in 1973, 1977 and 1981. One councillor was elected at each election using first-past-the-post voting. Shelagh Roberts, who won the seat at the 1973 and 1977 elections, had also been elected to the predecessor Havering electoral division in 1970.

=== 1973 election ===
The fourth election to the GLC (and first using revised boundaries) was held on 12 April 1973. The electorate was 63,922 and one Conservative Party councillor was elected. The turnout was 41.5%. The councillor was elected for a three-year term. This was extended for an extra year in 1976 when the electoral cycle was switched to four-yearly.

1973 Greater London Council election: Upminster
Party	Candidate	Votes	%	±%
Conservative	Shelagh Marjorie Roberts	11,425	43.08	
Labour	Maureen Harwood	10,687	40.29	
Liberal	R. E. Jenking	4,408	16.63	
Turnout				
Conservative win (new seat)				

=== 1977 election ===
The fifth election to the GLC (and second using revised boundaries) was held on 5 May 1977. The electorate was 64,627 and one Conservative Party councillor was elected. The turnout was 49.0%. The councillor was elected for a four-year term.

1977 Greater London Council election: Upminster
Party	Candidate	Votes	%	±%
Conservative	Shelagh Marjorie Roberts	18,820	59.57	
Labour	R. E. Whitworth	8,742	27.65	
National Front	J. Roberts	2,325	7.36	
Liberal	David J. Ingle	1,715	5.43	
Turnout				
Conservative hold		Swing		

=== 1981 election ===
The sixth and final election to the GLC (and third using revised boundaries) was held on 7 May 1981. The electorate was 66,127 and one Conservative Party councillor was elected. The turnout was 48.2%. The councillor was elected for a four-year term, extended by an extra year by the Local Government (Interim Provisions) Act 1984, ahead of the abolition of the council.

1981 Greater London Council election: Upminster
Party	Candidate	Votes	%	±%
Conservative	Anthony William Bays	14,549	45.76	
Labour	Graham W. Allen	12,391	38.97	
Liberal	David J. Ingle	4,213	13.24	
National Front	William J. Neary	655	2.06	
Turnout				
Conservative hold		Swing		
