= Rose Hacker =

British politician (1906–2008)

Rose Hacker (3 March 1906 – 4 February 2008) was a British socialist, writer, sex educator and campaigner for social justice. At her death, aged 101, she was the world's oldest newspaper columnist.

== Life ==
Hacker was born in central London. Her parents were middle class Jewish immigrants, and her father ran a business making women's clothes. She studied art, design, French and German at the Regent Street Polytechnic, but was a voracious learner outside formal education, aided by an incredible memory. After leaving polytechnic, she worked for her father as a model, designer and assistant, while keeping up a full social life in London. She had to give up her first love, a doctor, because the social mores and economic realities of the day forced him to choose between marriage and a career. She was outraged that life should create such situations, but later had a happy marriage with Mark Hacker, an accountant. They had two sons and adopted a daughter.

She developed her talents as an artist and sculptor, having a piece displayed in the British Museum. She remained active even late in life, practising belly-dancing, tai chi and the Alexander Technique, and swimming most days. In 2007, she and two fellow care home residents performed a dance choreographed specially for them at The Place, in Euston.

== Work ==
Hacker became a pacifist and socialist in her teens, having seen wounded soldiers returning from World War I, and hunger marchers from Wales and the Midlands in Oxford Street. In the 1930s she worked against fascism and to relieve the sufferings of the working class during the Great Depression. In 1931, at the height of Joseph Stalin's purges, she visited the USSR along with the Sydney & Beatrice Webb. Writing of her trip in the Camden New Journal, Hacker said: 'of course we didn't know what he (Stalin) was doing then' seemingly indicating that, like many people on the left at that time, she did not believe the atrocity stories circulating about the regime. The phrase 'we did not know' in regard to Stalin's terror has to be set alongside the fact that, also in 1931, a conference against 'slavery in Russia' took place at London's Royal Albert Hall. Hacker's activism continued as she became involved with the Co-operative Correspondence Club, and she became more involved with education, counselling and helping the disadvantaged through her work as a relationship counsellor with the Marriage Guidance Council after the Second World War. This led to work in prisons, mental hospitals and with the disabled, and she also championed housing rights and equality for all.

In 1949, she was one of the researchers for a study on sexual behaviour in Britain, dubbed "Little Kinsey" after the 1948 American Kinsey Report. The study grew out of Britain's Mass Observation programme and was partly funded by the Daily Mirror's Sunday Pictorial. It went further than the first Kinsey Report by interviewing women as well as men, but its findings were deemed shocking and few were made public.

One of the biggest problems she uncovered was that of unconsummated marriages. Hacker wrote several books, but it was her sex education book, Telling the Teenagers: A guide to parents, teachers and youth leaders (1957), that became a best seller. It was revised and republished in 1960 as The Opposite Sex: Vital knowledge about adult relationships – from your first "date" to married life and love.

After years of serving on voluntary and local government organisations, Hacker was elected to the Greater London Council as Labour Party member for St Pancras. Her election slogan was "bring the countryside to London". She was also chair of the Thames Waterways Board.

She wanted her great-grandchildren to know that right up to the end she had fought to leave a better world for them than the one she felt politicians and financial interests were creating.

— Bernard Miller, Camden New Journal

When the editor of her local North London newspaper, the Camden New Journal heard her speak on nuclear disarmament, he offered her a fortnightly column in the paper. The column first appeared in September 2006 and generated considerable interest. For the last 18 months of her life she was in great demand for television, radio and magazine interviews and articles. She wrote the column as a personal testament to the truth, and was disappointed to discover no one had written in to complain about it.

Hacker died in hospital in 2008 after a fortnight's illness.

Assembly seats
New constituency	Member of the Greater London Council for St Pancras North; 1973 – 1977	Succeeded by Anne Sofer
