= Morgan v Simpson =

1975 UK constitutional law case

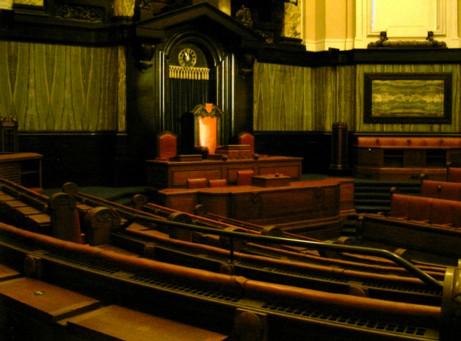
- Greater London Council
- Court: Court of Appeal
- Citation: [1975] QB 151; [1974] 3 WLR 517; [1974] 3 All ER 722; 72 LGR 715; (1974) 118 SJ 736

Keywords
- Voting, elections, integrity, democracy

Morgan v Simpson [1975] QB 151 is a UK constitutional law case, concerning the right to vote and the integrity of votes and elections in the United Kingdom.

== Facts ==
Gladys Morgan and four voters in the 1973 election for the Greater London Council petitioned that the election for the seat of Croydon North East was invalid as 44 unstamped ballot papers were not counted. At 18 polling stations, official counters had inadvertently not stamped papers with the official marks. The Labour candidate declared ‘duly elected’, David Simpson, had a majority of only 11, and if the uncounted papers were included, Morgan (the Conservative candidate, and an incumbent) would have won instead by 7 votes. They claimed there was an ‘act or omission’ in breach of an officer’s official duty, and that it affected the result under section 37 of the Representation of the People Act 1949.

The Divisional Court held the election was conducted ‘substantially in accordance with the law as to elections’ and the fact that small errors affected the result was not enough. Morgan appealed. Anthony Scrivener appeared for the Director of Public Prosecutions.

== Judgment ==
The Court of Appeal declared the election invalid, because the result would have been affected. On the proper construction of the Representation of the People Act 1949 section 37(1), any breach of local election rules was enough to compel the court to declare the election void.

Lord Denning MR said the following:

... I should think that the 44 mistakes were due largely to the fault of the officers in the polling stations and very little to the fault of the voters. If their votes are not to count, they are disfranchised without any real blame attaching to them.

Such being the facts, I turn to the law. It depends on section 37 of the Representation of the People Act 1949. It says:

"(1) No local government election shall be declared invalid by reason of any act or omission of the returning officer or any other person in breach of his official duty in connection with the election or otherwise of the local elections rules if it appears to the tribunal having cognizance of the question that the election was so conducted as to be substantially in accordance with the law as to elections and that the act or omission did not affect its result."

That section is expressed in the negative. It says when an election is not to be declared invalid. The question of law in this case is whether it should be transformed into the positive so as to show when an election is to be declared invalid. So that it would run:

"A local government election shall be declared invalid (by reason of any act or omission of the returning officer or any other person in breach of his official duty in connection with the election or otherwise of the local election rules) if it appears to the tribunal having cognisance of the question that the election was not so conducted as to be substantially in accordance with the law as to elections or that the act or omission did affect the result."

I think that the section should be transformed so as to read positively in the way I have stated. I have come to this conclusion from the history of the law as to elections and the cases under the statutes to which I now turn, underlining the important points.

The common law method of election was by show of hands. But if a poll was demanded, the election was by poll: see Anthony v Seger (1789) 1 Hag.Con. 9, 13. A poll was taken in this way: the returning officer or his clerk had a book in which he kept a record of the votes cast. Each voter went up to the clerk, gave his name, and stated his qualification. The clerk wrote down his name. The voter stated the candidate for whom he voted. The poll clerk recorded his vote. (Sometimes the voter went up with a card on which the particulars were written: and these were written down by the poll clerk.) After the poll was concluded, the votes were counted and the result announced. But the poll book was open to inspection. Then, if required, there was a scrutiny at which a vote could be challenged, for example, by showing that a voter was not qualified to vote. In that event his vote was not counted. So the result was decided according to the number of votes cast which were valid votes. Sometimes the returning officer or his clerk might refuse to record some of the votes without good cause. If it were found that the rejected votes would have given a different result, the election would be vitiated: see Faulkner v Elger (1825) 4 B. & C. 449. If they would not have affected the result, the election was good, but the rejected voter could have an action for damages against the returning officer: see Ashby v White (1703) 2 Ld. Raym. 938.

Such was the method of election at common law. It was open. Not by secret ballot. Being open, it was disgraced by abuses of every kind, especially at parliamentary elections. Bribery, corruption, treating, personation, were rampant. These were not investigated by the courts of law. They were the subject of petition to Parliament itself. Often members were unseated and elections declared invalid. If you should wish to know what happened, you will find it in Power, Rodwell & Dew Reports of Controverted Elections (1848-1853) and in Charles Dickens' account of the election at Eatanswill.

In 1868 the judges were brought in for the first time. By the Parliamentary Elections Act 1868, a petition to unseat a member was to be tried by a judge of one of the superior courts. He was to make a report to the Speaker: and his report had the same effect as that of an Election Committee previously. After that Act, the judges tried many election petitions. Nearly all of them were for bribery, corruption and treating. Most of them will be found in O'Malley & Hardcastle's Reports (1869-1874). There is one relevant to our present case. It arose out of an election at Taunton in 1868. It shows that, when a petition alleged that the unsuccessful candidate had the majority of legal votes, the manner of ascertaining the truth was by a scrutiny of the votes. If, on the scrutiny, it was found that he had obtained the majority of legal votes, the sitting member was unseated and the defeated candidate was returned: see Leigh & Le Marchant's Election Law, 2nd ed. (1874), p. 75, where this proposition is better stated than in the report of In re Taunton Election Petition; Waygood v James (1869) L.R. 4 C.P. 361.

Then in 1872 Parliament passed the Ballot Act 1872 [Parliamentary and Municipal Elections Act]. It revolutionised the system of voting at elections. It provided for voting by secret ballot. It prescribed rules and set out forms of ballot papers. It contained a provision as to noncompliance with the rules. It is the forerunner of the section which we have to consider today. Section 13 of the Act of 1872 said:

"No election shall be declared invalid by reason of a non-compliance with the rules contained in Schedule 1 to this Act, or any mistake in the use of the forms in Schedule 2 to this Act, if it appears to the tribunal having cognizance of the question that the election was conducted in accordance with the principles laid down in the body of this Act, and that such non-compliance or mistake did not affect the result of the election."

Soon after that Act was passed, Leigh and Le Marchant published a valuable commentary on it. They transformed the negative into the positive in the way I have suggested [ Leigh & Le Marchant's Election Law], at p. 97:

"A non-compliance with the provisions of the Ballot Act 1872, and Schedules 1 and 2, or a mistake at the poll, will vitiate the election, if it should appear that the result of the election was affected thereby, but not otherwise, provided the election was conducted in accordance with the principles laid down in the body of the Act."

A little later, the Act was considered by Grove J. in 1874 in In re Hackney Election Petition: Gill v Reed (1874) 2 O'M. & H. 77. In that case there were 19 polling stations, but two were closed all day, and three others were only open for part of the day. The result was that 5,000 persons (out of 41,000) were unable to vote. Grove J. held at p. 84 that the election was not "conducted in accordance with the principles laid down in the body of the Act" and was therefore void. He said that the object of the provision was, at p. 85:

"an election is not to be upset for an informality or for a triviality, it is not to be upset because the clerk of one of the polling stations was five minutes too late, or because some of the polling papers were not delivered in a proper manner, or were not marked in a proper way. The objection must be something substantial,..."

The Act was soon afterwards considered in 1875 by the Court of Common Pleas in Woodward v Sarsons (1875) L.R. 10 C.P. 733. A polling officer made this mistake. He wrote, on each of the ballot papers, the voter's number as it appeared on the electoral roll. That rendered the ballot papers void. There were 294 of them, 234 for Woodward and 60 for Sarsons. The returning officer, quite properly, rejected them. On his count, Sarsons got 965 and Woodward 775. Woodward asked the court to declare that, for breach of the rules, the election should be declared invalid. The Court of Common Pleas had a scrutiny and went into all the alleged breaches. (There were some others besides the 294.) They found that the errors did not affect the result. Even if the polling officer had made no mistakes, the result would have been Sarsons 1,025 and Woodward 1,008. So Sarsons would have won anyway. The court said, at p. 750:

"the errors of the presiding officers at the polling stations... did not affect the result of the election, and did not prevent the majority of electors from effectively exercising their votes in favour of the candidate they preferred, and therefore that the election cannot be declared void...."

But if the errors had affected the result (in other words, if Woodward would have won but for the mistakes of the polling officers), the court, as I read the judgment, would have declared the election void. Whilst I agree with the passage which I have quoted, there are other passages with which I do not agree. Some of them are erroneous, as Stephenson L.J. will point out. Others are not sense, as Lawton L.J. will observe. In future, the case should be regarded as authority only for what it decided, and not for what was said in it.

Next comes In re Islington West Division; Medhurst v Lough (1901) 17 TLR 210. A presiding officer, in breach of the rules, gave out 14 ballot papers after 8 p.m., which was closing time. They were invalid and ought not to have been counted. But they were counted. Lough was declared elected by 19 votes. Medhurst, the other candidate, sought to have the election declared void. The court went into the details. They said that even if all the votes on the 14 papers given out after 8 p.m. were given for Mr. Lough, there was a majority of five for him. The irregularity did not affect the result of the election. So it was not avoided.

In 1949 came the Representation of the People Act 1949. Section 37 is in substantially the same terms as section 13 of the Act of 1872. Under it there is a good illustration in Gunn v Sharpe [1974] Q.B. 808, decided earlier this year. At 10 polling stations ballot papers were issued for the election of three councillors. The polling clerks made mistakes in that they issued 102 ballot papers without stamping them with the official mark. These were rejected and not counted. The court looked to see whether the mistakes in those 102 did affect the result....

Accordingly, if the unmarked papers had been counted, nos. 2 and 3 would have been unsuccessful. The court declared the election of those two to be void. They put it on the ground that the election was not so conducted as to be substantially in accordance with the law as to elections. But I think it should have been put on the ground that the mistakes did affect the result of the election.

Collating all these cases together, I suggest that the law can be stated in these propositions:

1. If the election was conducted so badly that it was not substantially in accordance with the law as to elections, the election is vitiated, irrespective of whether the result was affected or not. That is shown by the Hackney case, 2 O'M. & H. 77, where two out of 19 polling stations were closed all day, and 5,000 voters were unable to vote.

2 If the election was so conducted that it was substantially in accordance with the law as to elections, it is not vitiated by a breach of the rules or a mistake at the polls - provided that it did not affect the result of the election. That is shown by the Islington case, 17 T.L.R. 210, where 14 ballot papers were issued after 8 p.m.

3. But, even though the election was conducted substantially in accordance with the law as to elections, nevertheless if there was a breach of the rules or a mistake at the polls - and it did affect the result - then the election is vitiated. That is shown by Gunn v Sharpe [1974] Q.B. 808, where the mistake in not stamping 102 ballot papers did affect the result.

Applying these propositions, it is clear that in this case, although the election was conducted substantially in accordance with the law, nevertheless the mistake in not stamping 44 papers did affect the result. So the election is vitiated. The election of Mr. Simpson must be declared invalid.

I would allow the appeal, accordingly.

Stephenson LJ concurred and said the following in conclusion:

I now answer my four main questions as follows:

1 and 2. Any breach of the local elections rules which affects the result of an election is by itself enough to compel the tribunal to declare the election void. It is not also necessary that the election should be conducted not substantially in accordance with the law as to local elections. As such a significant breach of the rules is admitted, the appeal must be allowed on that ground.

3 and 4. For an election to be conducted substantially in accordance with that law there must be a real election by ballot and no such substantial departure from the procedure laid down by Parliament as to make the ordinary man condemn the election as a sham or a travesty of an election by ballot. Instances of such a substantial departure would be allowing voters to vote for a person who was not in fact a candidate or refusing to accept a qualified candidate on some illegal ground or disfranchising a substantial proportion of qualified voters, but not such an irregularity as was committed in this case or perhaps in Gunn v. Sharpe.

These last answers are not necessary to the decision of this appeal if I am right in my construction of the section, but as I may be wrong in disagreeing as I have with the Divisional Court's interpretation, I have thought it right to state my agreement with their decision that this election was conducted substantially in accordance with the law as to elections and to give my reasons for agreeing as well as for disagreeing with the judgment under appeal. But what is substantial is a question of degree and I find it easier to give instances of what is and is not substantial than to define precisely in other words what the language of the section means.

I would add that if the result of our decision and questions of public interest are to be considered, the reasons for granting this petition seem to me to outweigh such reasons as the Divisional Court gave for rejecting it. In my judgment Mr. Simpson was not duly elected and I would allow this appeal and declare the election void.

Lawton LJ gave a concurring opinion, and said the following:

Before the Parliamentary Elections Act 1868, the House of Commons itself had dealt with election petitions. It had acted on the report of one of its committees and sometimes judges were called in to advise. The principles upon which Parliament proceeded were considered by the Court of Common Pleas in Woodward v Sarsons (1875) L.R. 10 C.P. 733. The judgment was delivered by Lord Coleridge C.J. The broad issue was whether under the Ballot Act 1872 municipal elections were to be declared invalid on the same or different principles from those followed for parliamentary elections at common law, there being no evidence at all that such irregularities as had been proved would have affected the result. The court adjudged that the common law principles and those to be applied under section 13 of the Ballot Act 1872 were the same. Lord Coleridge CJ stated the common law rule for parliamentary elections as follows, at p. 743:

"... the true statement is that an election is to be declared void by the common law applicable to parliamentary elections, if it was so conducted that the tribunal which is asked to avoid it is satisfied, as matter of fact, either that there was no real electing at all, or that the election was not really conducted under the subsisting election laws."

It is important to bear in mind that the Court of Common Pleas did not consider what was the practice of Parliament in cases where, although the election had been conducted substantially in accordance with the subsisting election laws, the proven irregularities had affected the result. Counsel, whose researches had been thorough, were unable to cite any case before 1872 in which such an issue had been considered.

It seems to me likely that Parliament in 1872 intended to apply to the new system of voting the same principles for declaring elections invalid as the House of Commons had applied before 1868. This was certainly so for elections in which the irregularities did not affect the result. If the scheme of the Act of 1872 was to envisage that irregularities would render an election invalid unless specific circumstances existed (as I adjudge it to have been) the word "and" presents no difficulty and can be construed gammatically both in the Act of 1872 and in section 37 (1) of the Act of 1949 since both sets of circumstances have to exist to avoid the consequences of irregularity. In this case there was only one. A declaration of invalidity must follow.

The Divisional Court decided otherwise, finding their answer to the problem presented by this case in a passage in the judgment of Lord Coleridge C.J. in Woodward v. Sarsons at p. 751. That judge referred to the construction of the Act of 1872 which I favour, and went on as follows:

"If this proposition be closely examined, it will be found to be equivalent to this, that the non-observance of the rules or forms which is to render the election invalid, must be so great as to amount to a conducting of the election in a manner contrary to the principle of an election by ballot, and must be so great as to satisfy the tribunal that it did affect or might have affected the majority of the voters, or, in other words, the result of the election. It therefore is, as has been said, an enactment ex abundanti cautela, declaring that to be the law applicable to elections under the Ballot Act which would have been the law to be applied if this section had not existed. It follows that, for the same reasons which prevent us from holding that this election was void at common law, we must hold that it is not void under the statute."

This passage does not make sense to me no matter how closely I examine it. I accept that at common law the irregularities had to be substantial to render an election invalid if, as in Woodward v. Sarsons, the irregularities did not affect the result. As I would have expected from a principle evolved from the practice of the House of Commons, this accords with common sense. But when irregularities affect the result, as in this case, I cannot see why a principle applicable to wholly different circumstances should operate to produce a result which many reasonable people would regard as unjust.

The Divisional Court found support for their decision in what they thought would be the undesirable consequences of construing section 37 (1) of the Act of 1949 in the way I find it should be construed. I am not satisfied, as the Divisional Court seems to have been, that this construction would be likely to result in many more election petitions where majorities have been small. In cases where majorities are small, say under 100, the unsuccessful candidates may seek to have the election declared invalid. In these days of voting rights for all persons aged 18 and over such small majorities are rare anyway, and even more rare would be the cases in which the unmarked ballot papers would have affected the result; but even if they are not, the unattractive possibility of more election petitions cannot be a sound reason for giving section 37 (1) a meaning other than that which the words themselves bear....
