= Croydon Central (electoral division) =

Electoral division in Greater London, 1973–1986

- Former electoral division for the Greater London Council
- Croydon Central electoral division boundaries
- District: Croydon
- Electorate: 66,479 (1973); 67,070 (1977); 67,107 (1980); 66,585 (1981)
- Area: 2,604 hectares (26.04 km^{2})

Former electoral division
- Created: 1973
- Abolished: 1986
- Member: 1
- Created from: Croydon

Croydon Central was an electoral division for the purposes of elections to the Greater London Council. The constituency elected one councillor for a four-year term in 1973, 1977 and 1981, with the final term extended for an extra year ahead of the abolition of the Greater London Council.

== History ==
It was planned to use the same boundaries as the Westminster Parliament constituencies for election of councillors to the Greater London Council (GLC), as had been the practice for elections to the predecessor London County Council, but those that existed in 1965 crossed the Greater London boundary. Until new constituencies could be settled, the 32 London boroughs were used as electoral areas. The London Borough of Croydon formed the Croydon electoral division. This was used for the Greater London Council elections in 1964, 1967 and 1970.

The new constituencies were settled following the Second Periodic Review of Westminster constituencies and the new electoral division matched the boundaries of the Croydon Central parliamentary constituency.

It covered an area of 2,604 hectares (26.04 km^{2}).

== Elections ==
The Croydon Central constituency was used for the Greater London Council elections in 1973, 1977 and 1981. One councillor was elected at each election using first-past-the-post voting.

=== 1973 election ===
The fourth election to the GLC (and first using revised boundaries) was held on 12 April 1973. The electorate was 66,479 and one Labour Party councillor was elected. The turnout was 42.3%. The councillor was elected for a three-year term. This was extended for an extra year in 1976 when the electoral cycle was switched to four-yearly.

1973 Greater London Council election: Croydon Central
Party	Candidate	Votes	%	±%
Labour	David Frank White	13,029	46.30	
Conservative	Sonia Copland	10,914	38.78	
Liberal	Roy A. Lightwing	3,965	14.09	
Independent	J. T. E. A. Waddell	241	0.86	
Turnout				
Labour win (new seat)				

=== 1977 election ===
The fifth election to the GLC (and second using revised boundaries) was held on 5 May 1977. The electorate was 67,070 and one Conservative Party councillor was elected. The turnout was 46.2%. The councillor was elected for a four-year term.

1977 Greater London Council election: Croydon Central
Party	Candidate	Votes	%	±%
Conservative	Gordon William Herbert Taylor	17,964	57.94	
Labour Co-op	D. F. White	10,340	33.36	
Liberal	Roy A. Lightwing	1,713	5.52	
National Front	P. W. Moss	687	2.22	
National Party	W. H. Porter	299	0.96	
Turnout				
Conservative gain from Labour		Swing		

=== 1980 by-election ===
A by-election was held on 20 March 1980, following the resignation of Gordon William Herbert Taylor. The by-election coincided with one in Croydon North East. The electorate was 67,107 and one Conservative Party councillor was elected. The turnout was 28.4%.

Croydon Central by-election, 1980
Party	Candidate	Votes	%	±%
Conservative	Robert Gurth Hughes	9,345	49.04	
Labour	A. Ebsworth	7,768	40.78	
Liberal	J. P. Johnson	1,659	8.70	
National Front	K. Field	280	1.47	
Turnout				
Conservative hold		Swing		

=== 1981 election ===
The sixth and final election to the GLC (and third using revised boundaries) was held on 7 May 1981. The electorate was 66,585 and one Conservative Party councillor was elected. The turnout was 43.9%. The councillor was elected for a four-year term, extended by an extra year by the Local Government (Interim Provisions) Act 1984, ahead of the abolition of the council.

1981 Greater London Council election: Croydon Central
Party	Candidate	Votes	%	±%
Conservative	Robert Gurth Hughes	14,058	48.07	
Labour	John K.P. Evers	11,231	38.44	
Liberal	Patrick S. Ryan	3,947	13.49	
Turnout				
Conservative hold		Swing		
