= Norman Prichard =

British politician

Sir Norman George Mollett Prichard
- Born: 14 April 1895
- Died: 10 April 1972 (aged 76)
- Citizenship: British
- Occupations: Politician, barrister, civil servant
- Known for: Chairman of the London County Council
- Political party: Labour
- Children: Brian Norman Christopher Prichard CBE
- Awards: Knight Bachelor

Norman George Mollett Prichard (14 April 1895 – 10 April 1972) was a British politician, who chaired London County Council.

== Early life ==
Born in Denton, Norfolk, Prichard was the son of the Reverend Alfred G. Prichard, a minister and politician. Alfred Prichard served as a member of the London County Council for West Islington 1928-1945. Prichard House on Georges Road, Lower Holloway, is named after him, as was the former Alfred Prichard school, also on Georges Road, whose site is now part of Sacred Heart Primary School.

Norman grew up in London, and was educated at the Henry Thornton School in Clapham, then at King's College, London. He found work with the Inland Revenue, and became a supporter of the Labour Party. He also qualified as a barrister, and was accepted at Lincoln's Inn in 1924.

== Political career ==
In 1927, Prichard wished to follow his father and stand for the London County Council, but he was refused permission by his employer. Instead, he focused on more local government, winning election to Battersea Metropolitan Borough Council, and serving as Mayor of Battersea in 1935/36. From 1949, he led the joint standing committee of the London boroughs. In 1950, the government decided to permit its employees to sit on London County Council, and Prichard was elected as an alderman, and by 1955/56 was the council's chair.

He later served as chairman of the LCC Housing Committee, overseeing the building of new housing estates. In 1963, he spoke of plans for the Lansbury Estate, Poplar; This is the new East End, an area in which the old communities are being preserved but in a new physical environment worthy of the pride and spirit of the people who live there.

In 1965, London's local government was restructured. Prichard won a seat on the new Greater London Council, and he also became the first chair of the London Boroughs Association. He left the council in 1967, but was re-elected to it in 1970, representing Wandsworth. In his last years, he advocated for free public transport.

Civic offices
Preceded by Alfred Bailey	Mayor of Battersea; 1935–1936	Succeeded by Charles Barrington
Preceded by Victor Mishcon	Chair of London County Council; 1955–1956	Succeeded by Helen Bentwich
Political offices
Preceded by Donald Daines	Chairman of the Finance Committee of London County Council; 1956–1961	Succeeded by Reg Goodwin
