= Robert Hughes (Conservative politician) =

British politician

Robert Gurth Hughes (born 14 July 1951) is a British Conservative Party politician, who was a Government Minister in the 1990s.

== Parliamentary career ==
Hughes was unsuccessful as a candidate for Stepney and Poplar in the 1979 general election. In 1980 Hughes was elected to the Greater London Council representing Croydon Central, serving until 1986. He was the Conservative candidate in the 1983 Bermondsey by-election, and contested that constituency's successor seat of Southwark and Bermondsey at the 1983 general election.

In 1987 he was elected as the Member of Parliament (MP) for Harrow West. He successfully defended his seat at the 1992 election but at the 1997 election his 18,000 majority swung to a Labour majority of 1,240 votes for Gareth Thomas. Hughes' Parliamentary Aide in the Commons until May 1997 was fellow Harrow politician, Councillor Mark Versallion.

He served as a Government Whip in 1993 when the Maastricht bill went through the House, and was promoted to Parliamentary Under Secretary of State at the Office of Public Service and Science in the Cabinet Office in 1994 with responsibility for the Science Research Councils and the Medical Research Council.

On 6 March 1995, Hughes resigned as Minister responsible for the Citizen's Charter over an affair with a constituency worker who had come to him for help from an abusive relationship. Hughes confessed the affair and resigned when he believed that the liaison was about to be exposed in a Sunday newspaper.

He opposed the Conservative party line in 1996 by supporting a total ban on handguns in the wake of the Dunblane Massacre. Robert Hughes is a keen supporter of Land value tax to eliminate income and sales taxes.

== Post-political career ==
Upon leaving the Commons he became General Secretary and then Executive Director of the optical trade body, the Federation of Ophthalmic & Dispensing Opticians. He became the Chief Executive of the Association of Optometrists (AOP) in 2004. In 2011 he left AOP to become the Chief Executive of the Surrey Association for Visual Impairment. He served as chair of the Guildford Conservative association from 2017 to 2024, succeeded by Thom Van Every .

In May 2021 he was elected as a Conservative county councillor for Shere in the Surrey County Council election.

Parliament of the United Kingdom
Preceded by John Page	Member of Parliament for Harrow West; 1987–1997	Succeeded by Gareth Thomas
