= Romford (electoral division) =

Electoral division in Greater London, 1973–1986

- Former electoral division for the Greater London Council
- Romford electoral division boundaries
- District: Havering
- Electorate: 55,550 (1973); 54,662 (1977); 55,660 (1981); 56,587 (1985)
- Major settlements: Romford
- Area: 2,569 hectares (25.69 km^{2})

Former electoral division
- Created: 1973
- Abolished: 1986
- Member: 1
- Created from: Havering

Romford was an electoral division for the purposes of elections to the Greater London Council. The constituency elected one councillor for a four-year term in 1973, 1977 and 1981, with the final term extended for an extra year ahead of the abolition of the Greater London Council.

== History ==
It was planned to use the same boundaries as the Westminster Parliament constituencies for election of councillors to the Greater London Council (GLC), as had been the practice for elections to the predecessor London County Council, but those that existed in 1965 crossed the Greater London boundary. Until new constituencies could be settled, the 32 London boroughs were used as electoral areas. The London Borough of Havering formed the Havering electoral division. This was used for the Greater London Council elections in 1964, 1967 and 1970.

The new constituencies were settled following the Second Periodic Review of Westminster constituencies and the new electoral division matched the boundaries of the Romford parliamentary constituency.

It covered an area of 2,569 hectares (25.69 km^{2}).

== Elections ==
The Romford constituency was used for the Greater London Council elections in 1973, 1977 and 1981. One councillor was elected at each election using first-past-the-post voting. Bernard Brook-Partridge, who won the seat at all three elections, had also been elected to the predecessor Havering electoral division in 1967 and 1970.

=== 1973 election ===
The fourth election to the GLC (and first using revised boundaries) was held on 12 April 1973. The electorate was 55,550 and one Conservative Party councillor was elected. The turnout was 39.5%. The councillor was elected for a three-year term. This was extended for an extra year in 1976 when the electoral cycle was switched to four-yearly.

1973 Greater London Council election: Romford
Party	Candidate	Votes	%	±%
Conservative	Bernard Brook-Partridge	9,697	44.16	
Labour	K. St. J. D'Cruze	7,219	32.87	
Liberal	T. E. Hurlstone	4,693	21.38	
Communist	C. R. Harper	347	1.58	
Turnout				
Conservative win (new seat)				

=== 1977 election ===
The fifth election to the GLC (and second using revised boundaries) was held on 5 May 1977. The electorate was 54,662 and one Conservative Party councillor was elected. The turnout was 44.3%. The councillor was elected for a four-year term.

1977 Greater London Council election: Romford
Party	Candidate	Votes	%	±%
Conservative	Bernard Brook-Partridge	15,189	62.82	
Labour	M. J. Spencer	5,369	22.19	
Liberal	P. A. Longhorn	1,590	6.57	
National Front	M. P. V. Caine	1,392	5.76	
People and Agrarian Party	C. W. R. Goodwin	352	1.45	
Communist	C. R. Harper	300	1.24	
Turnout				
Conservative hold		Swing		

=== 1981 election ===
The sixth and final election to the GLC (and third using revised boundaries) was held on 7 May 1981. The electorate was 55,660 and one Conservative Party councillor was elected. The turnout was 44.5%. The councillor was elected for a four-year term, extended by an extra year by the Local Government (Interim Provisions) Act 1984, ahead of the abolition of the council.

1981 Greater London Council election: Romford
Party	Candidate	Votes	%	±%
Conservative	Bernard Brook-Partridge	12,041	48.64	
Labour	Jack Hoepelman	9,029	36.48	
Liberal	Pauline A. Longhorn	3,123	12.62	
National Front	Madeline P. Caine	562	2.27	
Turnout				
Conservative hold		Swing		

=== 1985 by-election ===
A by-election was held on 11 July 1985, following the resignation of Bernard Brook-Partridge. The by-election coincided with others in Putney and Vauxhall. The electorate was 56,587 and one Conservative Party councillor was elected. The turnout was 29.5%.

Romford by-election, 1985
Party	Candidate	Votes	%	±%
Conservative	Bob Neill	7,122	42.70	
Labour	Gillian Hannah-Rogers	4,793	28.74	
Liberal Alliance Focus Team	Pauline Longhorn	4,332	25.98	
Ecology	Diane Burgess	431	2.58	
Turnout				
Conservative hold		Swing		

Bob Neill would be elected in 2000 to the London Assembly from the Bexley and Bromley constituency.
