= Anne Sofer =

British politician (born 1937)

Anne Hallowell Sofer (born 19 April 1937) is a former British politician.

The daughter of Geoffrey Crowther, Sofer was educated at Swarthmore College in Pennsylvania, and then at Somerville College, Oxford. In 1972, she became the secretary of the National Association of Governors and Managers. She stood for the Labour Party in St Pancras North at the 1977 Greater London Council election, winning the seat. In 1981, she resigned from the Labour Party and joined the new Social Democratic Party (SDP). She resigned from the council, then stood in a by-election under her new party label, retaining the seat.

In 1982, Sofer was elected to the executive of the SDP. She stood in Hampstead and Highgate at the 1983 and 1987 UK general elections, taking third place on each occasion. The Greater London Council was abolished in 1986, following which Sofer stood in Hampstead and Highgate at the 1986 Inner London Education Authority election, but was defeated. She later supported the merger of the SDP into the new Liberal Democrats.

Sofer also served as a director of Channel 4 from 1981 to 1983. In 1983, she became a columnist with The Times. From 1989 until 1997, she served as the chief education officer of the London Borough of Tower Hamlets. Following her retirement, she founded the London Accord, which aimed to get businesses involved in the most disadvantaged schools, and also served on the Hackney Improvement Team.

Assembly seats
Preceded by Rose Hacker	Member of the Greater London Council for St Pancras North; 1977–1986	Succeeded by Council abolished
