= Croydon North East (electoral division) =

Electoral division in Greater London, 1973–1986

- Former electoral division for the Greater London Council
- Croydon North East electoral division boundaries
- District: Croydon
- Electorate: 58,784 (1973); 58,015 (1974); 57,163 (1977); 56,223 (1980); 56,008 (1981)
- Area: 2,604 hectares (26.04 km^{2})

Former electoral division
- Created: 1973
- Abolished: 1986
- Member: 1
- Created from: Croydon

Croydon North East was an electoral division for the purposes of elections to the Greater London Council. The constituency elected one councillor for a four-year term in 1973, 1977 and 1981, with the final term extended for an extra year ahead of the abolition of the Greater London Council.

== History ==
It was planned to use the same boundaries as the Westminster Parliament constituencies for election of councillors to the Greater London Council (GLC), as had been the practice for elections to the predecessor London County Council, but those that existed in 1965 crossed the Greater London boundary. Until new constituencies could be settled, the 32 London boroughs were used as electoral areas. The London Borough of Croydon formed the Croydon electoral division. This was used for the Greater London Council elections in 1964, 1967 and 1970.

The new constituencies were settled following the Second Periodic Review of Westminster constituencies and the new electoral division matched the boundaries of the Croydon North East parliamentary constituency.

It covered an area of 2,604 hectares (26.04 km^{2}).

== Elections ==
The Croydon North East constituency was used for the Greater London Council elections in 1973, 1977 and 1981. One councillor was elected at each election using first-past-the-post voting.

=== 1973 election ===
The fourth election to the GLC (and first using revised boundaries) was held on 12 April 1973. The electorate was 58,784 and one Labour Party councillor was elected. The turnout was 40.2%. The councillor was elected for a three-year term. This was extended for an extra year in 1976 when the electoral cycle was switched to four-yearly.

1973 Greater London Council election: Croydon North East
Party	Candidate	Votes	%	±%
Labour	David Howard Simpson	10,340	43.81	
Conservative	Gladys Emma Morgan	10,329	43.76	
Liberal	B. F. Steggles	2,940	12.45	
Turnout				
Labour win (new seat)				

=== 1974 by-election ===
A by-election was held on 5 September 1974, following the judgement of the 1973 election result as void. The electorate was 58,015 and one Conservative Party councillor was elected. The turnout was 35.4%.

Croydon North East by-election, 1974
Party	Candidate	Votes	%	±%
Conservative	Gladys Emma Morgan	10,176	49.51	
Labour	David Howard Simpson	8,543	41.57	
Liberal	J. H. Hamilton	1,831	8.91	
Turnout				
Conservative gain from Labour		Swing		

=== 1977 election ===
The fifth election to the GLC (and second using revised boundaries) was held on 5 May 1977. The electorate was 57,163 and one Conservative Party councillor was elected. The turnout was 43.4%. The councillor was elected for a four-year term.

1977 Greater London Council election: Croydon North East
Party	Candidate	Votes	%	±%
Conservative	Gladys Emma Morgan	15,135	60.96	
Labour	David Howard Simpson	7,591	30.58	
Liberal	Alan Taylor	1,472	5.93	
National Party	S. J. Brady	479	1.93	
GLC Abolitionist Campaign	Anthony J Cordle	158	0.64	
Turnout				
Conservative hold		Swing		

=== 1980 by-election ===
A by-election was held on 20 March 1980, following the death of Gladys Emma Morgan. The by-election coincided with one in Croydon Central. The electorate was 56,223 and one Conservative Party councillor was elected. The turnout was 27.6%.

Croydon North East by-election, 1980
Party	Candidate	Votes	%	±%
Conservative	Arthur James Rolfe	7,351	47.36	
Labour	K. R. Veness	6,701	43.18	
Liberal	P. T. Humphrey	1,469	9.46	
Turnout				
Conservative hold		Swing		

=== 1981 election ===
The sixth and final election to the GLC (and third using revised boundaries) was held on 7 May 1981. The electorate was 56,008 and one Conservative Party councillor was elected. The turnout was 43.4%. The councillor was elected for a four-year term, extended by an extra year by the Local Government (Interim Provisions) Act 1984, ahead of the abolition of the council.

1981 Greater London Council election: Croydon North East
Party	Candidate	Votes	%	±%
Conservative	Arthur James Rolfe	11,486	47.28	
Labour	Peter L. Spalding	9,308	38.33	
Liberal	Leslie Anthony Rowe	3,506	14.42	
Turnout				
Conservative hold		Swing		
