= Wandsworth (electoral division) =

Electoral division in Greater London, 1965–1973

- Former electoral division for the Greater London Council
- Wandsworth electoral division boundaries
- District: London Borough of Wandsworth
- Population: 319,190 (1969 estimate)
- Electorate: 223,185 (1964); 216,617 (1967); 223,189 (1970); 216,934 (1972)
- Area: 8,628.0 acres (34.916 km^{2})

Former electoral division
- Created: 1965
- Abolished: 1973
- Member(s): 4
- Replaced by: Battersea North, Battersea South, Putney and Tooting

Wandsworth was an electoral division for the purposes of elections to the Greater London Council. The constituency elected four councillors for a three-year term in 1964, 1967 and 1970.

== History ==
It was planned to use the same boundaries as the Westminster Parliament constituencies for election of councillors to the Greater London Council (GLC), as had been the practice for elections to the predecessor London County Council, but those that existed in 1965 crossed the Greater London boundary. Until new constituencies could be settled, the 32 London boroughs were used as electoral areas which therefore created a constituency called Wandsworth.

The electoral division was replaced from 1973 by the single-member electoral divisions of Battersea North, Battersea South, Putney and Tooting.

== Elections ==
The Wandsworth constituency was used for the Greater London Council elections in 1964, 1967 and 1970. Four councillors were elected at each election using first-past-the-post voting.

=== 1964 election ===
The first election was held on 9 April 1964, a year before the council came into its powers. The electorate was 223,185 and four Labour Party councillors were elected. With 102,915 people voting, the turnout was 46.1%. The councillors were elected for a three-year term.

1964 Greater London Council election: Wandsworth
Party	Candidate	Votes	%	±%
Labour	Mrs. M. C. Jay	53,747		
Labour	Norman George Mollett Prichard	52,606		
Labour	George Frederick Rowe	51,857		
Labour	Joseph Simeon Samuels	51,292		
Conservative	Miss M. Bowen	37,459		
Conservative	J. I. Tweedie-Smith	37,292		
Conservative	F. L. Abbott	37,258		
Conservative	D. Y. Fell	36,776		
Liberal	A. Cowen	8,630		
Liberal	R. A. Locke	8,443		
Liberal	M. E. Lawson	7,897		
Liberal	C. V. Gittins	7,716		
Communist	Mrs. G. M. Easton	3,116		
Communist	D. J. Welsh	2,143		
Turnout				
Labour win (new seat)				
Labour win (new seat)				
Labour win (new seat)				
Labour win (new seat)				

=== 1967 election ===
The second election was held on 13 April 1967. The electorate was 216,167 and four Conservative Party councillors were elected. With 91,236 people voting, the turnout was 42.1%. The councillors were elected for a three-year term.

1967 Greater London Council election: Wandsworth
Party	Candidate	Votes	%	±%
Conservative	Frank Lewis Abbott	45,133		
Conservative	Anthony Vincent Bradbury	45,003		
Conservative	William J. Shelton	44,383		
Conservative	Jack Elmer Swanson	43,424		
Labour	Mrs. M. C. Jay	37,956		
Labour	Joseph Simeon Samuels	36,649		
Labour	S. F. C. Sporle	36,284		
Labour	Norman G. M. Prichard	31,672		
Liberal	C. H. Pritchard	11,319		
Liberal	Mrs. E. K. Benest	5,058		
Liberal	D. J. A. Livingstone	4,500		
Liberal	Mrs. A. P. Uziell-Hamilton	4,448		
Communist	Mrs. G. M. Easton	1,754		
Commonwealth Party of Great Britain	T. A. Cox	1,371		
Communist	D. J. Welsh	1,188		
Independent	T. Lamb	1,139		
Independent	E. D. Larkin	953		
Commonwealth Party of Great Britain	P. A. Head	634		
Commonwealth Party of Great Britain	H. Petts	619		
Commonwealth Party of Great Britain	R. D. Wagenaar	230		
Turnout				
Conservative gain from Labour		Swing		
Conservative gain from Labour		Swing		
Conservative gain from Labour		Swing		
Conservative gain from Labour		Swing		

=== 1970 election ===
The third election was held on 9 April 1970. The electorate was 223,189 and four Labour Party councillors were elected. With 83,107 people voting, the turnout was 37.2%. The councillors were elected for a three-year term.

1970 Greater London Council election: Wandsworth
Party	Candidate	Votes	%	±%
Labour	Mrs. Marie Jenkins	40,940		
Labour	Sir Norman Prichard	40,345		
Labour	Mrs. Gladys Felicia Dimson	40,330		
Labour	Joseph Simeon Samuels	40,097		
Conservative	William Jeremy Masefield Shelton	36,927		
Conservative	Jack Elmer Swanson	36,470		
Conservative	W. T. O. Wallace	36,307		
Conservative	Frank Lewis Abbott	36,140		
Liberal	R. C. H. Boddington	2,971		
Liberal	D. J. Livingstone	2,865		
Liberal	J. P. Grisewood	2,746		
Liberal	M. Findley	2,736		
Communist	Mrs. M. G. Easton	1,397		
Homes before Roads	J. K. Sheppard	1,127		
Communist	D. J. Welsh	1,098		
Homes before Roads	J. Bottomley	981		
Homes before Roads	P. Whelan	560		
Homes before Roads	W. Konopka-Nowina	508		
Union Movement	G. R. Wren	150		
Turnout				
Labour gain from Conservative		Swing		
Labour gain from Conservative		Swing		
Labour gain from Conservative		Swing		
Labour gain from Conservative		Swing		

=== 1972 by-election ===
A by-election was held on 15 June 1972, following the death of Sir Norman Prichard. The electorate was 216,934 and one Labour Party councillor was elected. With 39,699 voting, the turnout was 18.3%

Wandsworth by-election, 1972
Party	Candidate	Votes	%	±%
Labour	Alexander McLaughlin	26,537		
Conservative	Mrs. L. Chalker	12,767		
Union Movement	D. R. Gerlach	395		
Turnout				
Labour hold		Swing		
