= Putney (electoral division) =

Electoral division in Greater London, 1973–1986

- Former electoral division for the Greater London Council
- District: Wandsworth
- Electorate: 66,809 (1973); 64,969 (1977); 63,402 (1981)
- Area: 1,385 hectares (13.85 km^{2})

Former electoral division
- Created: 1973
- Abolished: 1986
- Member: 1
- Created from: Wandsworth

Putney was an electoral division for the purposes of elections to the Greater London Council. The constituency elected one councillor for a four-year term in 1973, 1977 and 1981, with the final term extended for an extra year ahead of the abolition of the Greater London Council.

== History ==
It was planned to use the same boundaries as the Westminster Parliament constituencies for election of councillors to the Greater London Council (GLC), as had been the practice for elections to the predecessor London County Council, but those that existed in 1965 crossed the Greater London boundary. Until new constituencies could be settled, the 32 London boroughs were used as electoral areas. The London Borough of Wandsworth formed the Wandsworth electoral division. This was used for the Greater London Council elections in 1964, 1967 and 1970.

The new constituencies were settled following the Second Periodic Review of Westminster constituencies and the new electoral division matched the boundaries of the Putney parliamentary constituency.

It covered an area of 1,385 hectares (13.85 km^{2}).

== Elections ==
The Putney constituency was used for the Greater London Council elections in 1973, 1977 and 1981. One councillor was elected at each election using first-past-the-post voting.

=== 1973 election ===
The fourth election to the GLC (and first using revised boundaries) was held on 12 April 1973. The electorate was 66,809 and one Labour Party councillor was elected. The turnout was 46.0%. The councillor was elected for a three-year term. This was extended for an extra year in 1976 when the electoral cycle was switched to four-yearly.

1973 Greater London Council election: Putney
Party	Candidate	Votes	%	±%
Labour	Ethel Marie Jenkins	15,449	50.24	
Conservative	M. Williams	11,282	36.70	
Liberal	W. V. Hain	3,649	11.87	
Communist	D. J. Welsh	375	1.22	
Turnout				
Labour win (new seat)				

=== 1977 election ===
The fifth election to the GLC (and second using revised boundaries) was held on 5 May 1977. The electorate was 64,969 and one Conservative Party councillor was elected. The turnout was 50.1%. The councillor was elected for a four-year term.

1977 Greater London Council election: Putney
Party	Candidate	Votes	%	±%
Conservative	John Leonard Harris	17,838	54.79	
Labour	G. Dyke	10,681	32.82	
Liberal	J. Horrocks	2,500	7.68	
National Front	C. Lewis	1,160	3.56	
Communist	D. J. Welsh	251	0.77	
GLC Abolitionist Campaign	J. E. Juszt	132	0.41	
Turnout				
Conservative gain from Labour		Swing		

=== 1981 election ===
The sixth and final election to the GLC (and third using revised boundaries) was held on 7 May 1981. The electorate was 63,402 and one Labour Party councillor was elected. The turnout was 54.1%. The councillor was elected for a four-year term, extended by an extra year by the Local Government (Interim Provisions) Act 1984, ahead of the abolition of the council.

1981 Greater London Council election: Putney
Party	Candidate	Votes	%	±%
Labour	Andrew Phillip Harris	14,488	42.26	
Conservative	Jeffrey Gordon	13,741	40.09	
Liberal	Colin G. Darracott	3,813	11.12	
Social Democrat	Michael J. Burton	1,555	4.53	
National Front	Shirley Attree	393	1.15	
Ecology	Geraldine A. Goller	240	0.70	
Save London Action Group	Mary M. Giles	53	0.15	
Turnout				
Labour gain from Conservative		Swing		

=== 1985 by-election ===
A by-election was held on 11 July 1985, following the resignation of Andrew Phillip Harris. The by-election coincided with others in Romford and Vauxhall. The electorate was 63,753 and one Labour Party councillor was elected. The turnout was 22.2%.

Putney by-election, 1985
Party	Candidate	Votes	%	±%
Labour	Margaret Anne Jenkins	8,680	61.40	
SDP	Jeremy N Ambache	4,900	34.63	
Ecology	Christopher Cantwell	392	2.77	
Pro-Abolition Alliance	Mark W Hatherell	171	1.21	
Turnout				
Labour hold		Swing		
