= Battersea South (electoral division) =

Electoral division in Greater London, 1973–1986

- Former electoral division for the Greater London Council
- Battersea South electoral division boundaries
- District: Wandsworth
- Electorate: 47,252 (1973); 44,511 (1977); 42,431 (1981)
- Area: 684 hectares (6.84 km^{2})

Former electoral division
- Created: 1973
- Abolished: 1986
- Member: 1
- Created from: Wandsworth

Battersea South was an electoral division for the purposes of elections to the Greater London Council. The constituency elected one councillor for a four-year term in 1973, 1977 and 1981, with the final term extended for an extra year ahead of the abolition of the Greater London Council.

== History ==
It was planned to use the same boundaries as the Westminster Parliament constituencies for election of councillors to the Greater London Council (GLC), as had been the practice for elections to the predecessor London County Council, but those that existed in 1965 crossed the Greater London boundary. Until new constituencies could be settled, the 32 London boroughs were used as electoral areas. The London Borough of Wandsworth formed the Wandsworth electoral division. This was used for the Greater London Council elections in 1964, 1967 and 1970.

The new constituencies were settled following the Second Periodic Review of Westminster constituencies and the new electoral division matched the boundaries of the Battersea South parliamentary constituency.

It covered an area of 684 hectares (6.84 km^{2}).

== Elections ==
The Battersea South constituency was used for the Greater London Council elections in 1973, 1977 and 1981. One councillor was elected at each election using first-past-the-post voting.

=== 1973 election ===
The fourth election to the GLC (and first using revised boundaries) was held on 12 April 1973. The electorate was 47,252 and one Labour Party councillor was elected. The turnout was 36.4%. The councillor was elected for a three-year term. This was extended for an extra year in 1976 when the electoral cycle was switched to four-yearly.

1973 Greater London Council election: Battersea South
Party	Candidate	Votes	%	±%
Labour	Stephen Robert Hatch	8,601	49.98	
Conservative	L. Chalker	6,224	36.17	
Liberal	C. V. Gittins	1,559	9.06	
National Front	T. Lamb	826	4.80	
Turnout				
Labour win (new seat)				

=== 1977 election ===
The fifth election to the GLC (and second using revised boundaries) was held on 5 May 1977. The electorate was 44,511 and one Conservative Party councillor was elected. The turnout was 44.5%. The councillor was elected for a four-year term.

1977 Greater London Council election: Battersea South
Party	Candidate	Votes	%	±%
Conservative	Margaret Williams	11,018	55.56	
Labour	M. Ward	6,666	33.61	
Liberal	R. Lewis	1,129	5.69	
National Front	R. A. Noyce	916	4.62	
GLC Abolitionist Campaign	J. M. Burroughes	100	0.50	
Turnout				
Conservative gain from Labour		Swing		

=== 1981 election ===
The sixth and final election to the GLC (and third using revised boundaries) was held on 7 May 1981. The electorate was 42,431 and one Labour Party councillor was elected. The turnout was 50.6%. The councillor was elected for a four-year term, extended by an extra year by the Local Government (Interim Provisions) Act 1984, ahead of the abolition of the council.

1981 Greater London Council election: Battersea South
Party	Candidate	Votes	%	±%
Labour	Valerie Wise	9,525	44.36	
Conservative	Margaret Williams	8,956	41.68	
Liberal	Charles S. Welchman	2,359	10.98	
Ecology	Bruce MacKenzie	337	1.57	
National Front	Anthony W. Perry	275	1.28	
Save London Action Group	Catherine D. Kennington	35	0.16	
Turnout				
Labour gain from Conservative		Swing		
