= Havering (electoral division) =

Electoral division in Greater London, 1965–1973

- Former electoral division for the Greater London Council
- Havering electoral division boundaries
- District: London Borough of Havering
- Population: 252,860 (1969 estimate)
- Electorate: 162,724 (1964); 162,807 (1967); 166,892 (1968); 178,278 (1970)
- Major settlements: Hornchurch, Romford, Upminster
- Area: 29,109.9 acres (117.804 km^{2})

Former electoral division
- Created: 1965
- Abolished: 1973
- Member: 3
- Replaced by: Hornchurch, Romford and Upminster

Havering was an electoral division for the purposes of elections to the Greater London Council. The constituency elected three councillors for a three-year term in 1964, 1967 and 1970. Bill Fiske, the first leader of the Greater London Council, was elected from the division.

== History ==
It was planned to use the same boundaries as the Westminster Parliament constituencies for election of councillors to the Greater London Council (GLC), as had been the practice for elections to the predecessor London County Council, but those that existed in 1965 crossed the Greater London boundary. Until new constituencies could be settled, the 32 London boroughs were used as electoral areas which therefore created a constituency called Havering.

The electoral division was replaced from 1973 by the single-member electoral divisions of Hornchurch, Romford and Upminster.

== Elections ==
The Havering constituency was used for the Greater London Council elections in 1964, 1967 and 1970. Three councillors were elected at each election using first-past-the-post voting. Bill Fiske, who was successful at the first election, was the first Leader of the Greater London Council.

=== 1964 election ===
The first election was held on 9 April 1964, a year before the council came into its powers. The electorate was 162,724 and three Labour Party councillors were elected. With 80,168 people voting, the turnout was 49.3%. The councillors were elected for a three-year term.

1964 Greater London Council election: Havering
| Party | Candidate | Votes | % | ±% |
|---|---|---|---|---|
| Labour | Bill Fiske | 36,280 | | |
| Labour | William Arthur Gillman | 34,915 | | |
| Labour | Bertie Edwin Roycraft | 32,150 | | |
| Conservative | N. L. Anfilogoff | 29,590 | | |
| Conservative | E. H. Dean | 29,394 | | |
| Conservative | E. T. Davies | 28,835 | | |
| Liberal | D. M. Hardy | 11,705 | | |
| Liberal | C. W. Brewster | 10,437 | | |
| Liberal | G. M. Horey | 8,930 | | |
| Communist | F. Barlow | 4,000 | | |
| Turnout | | | | |
| Labour win (new seat) | | | | |
| Labour win (new seat) | | | | |
| Labour win (new seat) | | | | |

=== 1967 election ===
The second election was held on 13 April 1967. The electorate was 162,807 and three Conservative Party councillors were elected. With 83,534 people voting, the turnout was 51.3%. The councillors were elected for a three-year term.

1967 Greater London Council election: Havering
| Party | Candidate | Votes | % | ±% |
|---|---|---|---|---|
| Conservative | Bernard Brook-Partridge | 44,535 | | |
| Conservative | David Thornton | 43,899 | | |
| Conservative | Jeffrey Archer | 43,379 | | |
| Labour | Bill Fiske | 31,263 | | |
| Labour | W.A. Gillman | 30,032 | | |
| Labour | M. J. Ward | 29,567 | | |
| Liberal | B. A. Grant | 6,336 | | |
| Liberal | A. C. Stubbs | 5,232 | | |
| Liberal | J. W. South | 4,670 | | |
| Communist | L. Cohen | 2,982 | | |
| Turnout | | | | |
| Conservative gain from Labour | | Swing | | |
| Conservative gain from Labour | | Swing | | |
| Conservative gain from Labour | | Swing | | |

=== 1968 by-election ===
A by-election was held on 12 December 1968, following the resignation of David Thornton. The electorate was 166,892 and one Conservative Party councillor was elected. With 7,811 voting, the turnout was 12.2%

Havering by-election, 1968
| Party | Candidate | Votes | % | ±% |
|---|---|---|---|---|
| Conservative | William Alfred Sibley | 13,480 | | |
| Labour | B. K. Lowton | 5,669 | | |
| Liberal | T. N. Willis | 1,253 | | |
| Turnout | | | | |
| Conservative hold | | Swing | | |

=== 1970 election ===
The third election was held on 9 April 1970. The electorate was 178,278 and three Conservative Party councillors were elected. With 63,465 people voting, the turnout was 35.6%. The councillors were elected for a three-year term.

1970 Greater London Council election: Havering
| Party | Candidate | Votes | % | ±% |
|---|---|---|---|---|
| Conservative | Bernard Brook-Partridge | 33,297 | | |
| Conservative | Trixie Gardner | 32,227 | | |
| Conservative | Shelagh Roberts | 31,642 | | |
| Labour | S. Dougherty | 25,601 | | |
| Labour | P. Downham | 25,460 | | |
| Labour | K. S. D'Cruze | 25,307 | | |
| Liberal | M. Benson | 3,449 | | |
| Liberal | J. R. Bastick | 3,158 | | |
| Liberal | B. A. Grant | 3,130 | | |
| Communist | C. R. Harper | 837 | | |
| Union Movement | R. Harris | 343 | | |
| Turnout | | | | |
| Conservative hold | | Swing | | |
| Conservative hold | | Swing | | |
| Conservative hold | | Swing | | |
