= 1959 London local elections =

Local elections in England

- 7 May 1959

All 1,336 councillors in all 28 metropolitan boroughs
	First party	Second party
Party	Labour	Conservative
Councils	18	10
Councils +/–	▼2	▲2
Councillors	853	479
Councillors +/–	▼59	▲47

Local elections were held in London on 7 May 1959.

== Electoral arrangements ==
The County of London, outside of the City of London, was divided into 28 metropolitan boroughs. Each borough was divided into a number of multi-member electoral wards.

Councillors were elected to serve a three year term, to go out of office in 1962.

Ward boundaries were changed in Stepney (60 councillors decreased to 40) and Westminster. Total councillors were reduced by 20 from 1,356 to 1,336.

== Results ==
Labour lost control of two councils, Lewisham and St Pancras, to the Conservatives. However, in Lewisham they were able to retain control of the council following the election of the mayor and aldermen.

The results for each borough were as follows:

Borough	Previous control	New control	Labour	Conservative	Communist	Independent	Total	Details
Battersea	Labour	Labour	34	21			55	
Bermondsey	Labour	Labour	45				45	Details
Bethnal Green	Labour	Labour	30				30	
Camberwell	Labour	Labour	48	12			60	
Chelsea	Conservative	Conservative	6	30			36	
Deptford	Labour	Labour	33	3			36	
Finsbury	Labour	Labour	29	5			34	
Fulham	Labour	Labour	31	9			40	
Greenwich	Labour	Labour	29	6			35	
Hackney	Labour	Labour	48				48	
Hammersmith	Labour	Labour	33	6			39	
Hampstead	Conservative	Conservative	6	36			42	
Holborn	Conservative	Conservative	3	39			42	
Islington	Labour	Labour	60				60	
Kensington	Conservative	Conservative	12	48			60	
Lambeth	Labour	Labour	46	14			60	
Lewisham	Labour	Conservative	27 (Note: Labour retained control of Lewisham council following the election of the mayor and aldermen.)	28			55	
Paddington	Conservative	Conservative	23	37			60	
Poplar	Labour	Labour	42				42	
Shoreditch	Labour	Labour	33				33	
Southwark	Labour	Labour	60 (Note: In Southwark the election was delayed until 26 May for one ward with seven seats due to the death of a candidate.)				60	Details
Stepney	Labour	Labour	37		2	1	40 (Note: The number of councillors elected in Stepney was reduced from 60 to 40.)	
St Marylebone	Conservative	Conservative	10	50			60	
Stoke Newington	Labour	Labour	30				30	
St Pancras	Labour	Conservative	27	33			60	
Wandsworth	Conservative	Conservative	25	35			60	
Westminster	Conservative	Conservative	6	53		1	60	
Woolwich	Labour	Labour	40	14			54	
Total			853	479	2	2	1,336	
