= St Pancras North (electoral division) =

Electoral division in Greater London, 1973–1986

- Former electoral division for the Greater London Council
- St Pancras North electoral division boundaries
- District: Camden
- Electorate: 41,733 (1973); 40,535 (1977); 41,183 (May 1981); 41,335 (Oct 1981)
- Area: 727 hectares (7.27 km^{2}) (1973); 729 hectares (7.29 km^{2}) (1977/1981)

Former electoral division
- Created: 1973
- Abolished: 1986
- Member: 1
- Created from: Camden

St Pancras North was an electoral division for the purposes of elections to the Greater London Council. The constituency elected one councillor for a four-year term in 1973, 1977 and 1981, with the final term extended for an extra year ahead of the abolition of the Greater London Council.

== History ==
It was planned to use the same boundaries as the Westminster Parliament constituencies for election of councillors to the Greater London Council (GLC), as had been the practice for elections to the predecessor London County Council, but those that existed in 1965 crossed the Greater London boundary. Until new constituencies could be settled, the 32 London boroughs were used as electoral areas. The London Borough of Camden formed the Camden electoral division. This was used for the Greater London Council elections in 1964, 1967 and 1970.

The new constituencies were settled following the Second Periodic Review of Westminster constituencies and the new electoral division matched the boundaries of the St Pancras North parliamentary constituency.

It covered an area of 727 hectares (7.27 km^{2}) in 1973. Revisions to ward boundaries in the London Borough of Camden changed the area of the division to 729 hectares (7.29 km^{2}) for the 1977 and 1981 elections.

== Elections ==
The St Pancras North constituency was used for the Greater London Council elections in 1973, 1977 and 1981. One councillor was elected at each election using first-past-the-post voting.

=== 1973 election ===
The fourth election to the GLC (and first using revised boundaries) was held on 12 April 1973. The electorate was 41,733 and one Labour Party councillor was elected. The turnout was 35.1%. The councillor was elected for a three-year term. This was extended for an extra year in 1976 when the electoral cycle was switched to four-yearly.

1973 Greater London Council election: St Pancras North
Party	Candidate	Votes	%	±%
Labour	Rose Hacker	9,915	67.72	
Conservative	N. J. Bennett	4,226	28.87	
Communist	V. A. Heath	497	3.39	
Turnout				
Labour win (new seat)				

=== 1977 election ===
The fifth election to the GLC (and second using revised boundaries) was held on 5 May 1977. The electorate was 40,535 and one Labour Party councillor was elected. The turnout was 39.8%. The councillor was elected for a four-year term.

1977 Greater London Council election: St Pancras North
Party	Candidate	Votes	%	±%
Labour	Anne Sofer	7,902	48.96	
Conservative	M. J. Frost	6,461	40.05	
Liberal	J. Mather	803	4.98	
National Front	L. D. Evans	599	3.71	
Communist	V. A. Heath	371	2.30	
Turnout				
Labour hold		Swing		

=== 1981 election ===
The sixth and final election to the GLC (and third using revised boundaries) was held on 7 May 1981. The electorate was 41,183 and one Labour Party councillor was elected. The turnout was 40.8%. The councillor was elected for a four-year term, extended by an extra year by the Local Government (Interim Provisions) Act 1984, ahead of the abolition of the council.

1981 Greater London Council election: St Pancras North
Party	Candidate	Votes	%	±%
Labour	Anne Sofer	9,935	59.14	
Conservative	Ian Pasley-Tyler	5,202	30.98	
Liberal	Dennis G. Strojwas	1,506	8.97	
Workers Revolutionary	Cornelius P. Murphy	148	0.88	
Turnout				
Labour hold		Swing		

=== 1981 by-election ===
A by-election was held on 29 October 1981, caused by the resignation of Anne Sofer. The electorate was 41,335 and one SDP–Liberal Alliance councillor was elected. The turnout was 38.4%.

St Pancras North by-election, 1981
Party	Candidate	Votes	%	±%
Alliance	Anne Sofer	6,919	43.58	
Labour	Mildred Gordon	6,181	38.93	
Conservative	Ian Pasley-Tyler	2,684	16.91	
Abolish the GLC	John J. de R. West	92	0.58	
Turnout				
