= Battersea North (electoral division) =

Electoral division in Greater London, 1973–1986

- Former electoral division for the Greater London Council
- Battersea North electoral division boundaries
- District: Wandsworth
- Electorate: 44,573 (1973); 42,897 (1977); 40,512 (1981); 41,454 (1985)
- Area: 646 hectares (6.46 km^{2})

Former electoral division
- Created: 1973
- Abolished: 1986
- Member: 1
- Created from: Wandsworth

Battersea North was an electoral division for the purposes of elections to the Greater London Council. The constituency elected one councillor for a four-year term in 1973, 1977 and 1981, with the final term extended for an extra year ahead of the abolition of the Greater London Council.

== History ==
It was planned to use the same boundaries as the Westminster Parliament constituencies for election of councillors to the Greater London Council (GLC), as had been the practice for elections to the predecessor London County Council, but those that existed in 1965 crossed the Greater London boundary. Until new constituencies could be settled, the 32 London boroughs were used as electoral areas. The London Borough of Wandsworth formed the Wandsworth electoral division. This was used for the Greater London Council elections in 1964, 1967 and 1970.

The new constituencies were settled following the Second Periodic Review of Westminster constituencies and the new electoral division matched the boundaries of the Battersea North parliamentary constituency.

It covered an area of 646 hectares (6.46 km^{2}).

== Elections ==
The Battersea North constituency was used for the Greater London Council elections in 1973, 1977 and 1981. One councillor was elected at each election using first-past-the-post voting.

=== 1973 election ===
The fourth election to the GLC (and first using revised boundaries) was held on 12 April 1973. The electorate was 44,573 and one Labour Party councillor was elected. The turnout was 33.5%. The councillor was elected for a three-year term. This was extended for an extra year in 1976 when the electoral cycle was switched to four-yearly.

1973 Greater London Council election: Battersea North
Party	Candidate	Votes	%	±%
Labour	Gladys Felicia Dimson	11,542	77.23	
Conservative	D. J. Wedgwood	3,407	22.77	
Turnout				
Labour win (new seat)				

=== 1977 election ===
The fifth election to the GLC (and second using revised boundaries) was held on 5 May 1977. The electorate was 42,897 and one Labour Party councillor was elected. The turnout was 37.8%. The councillor was elected for a four-year term.

1977 Greater London Council election: Battersea North
Party	Candidate	Votes	%	±%
Labour	Gladys Felicia Dimson	7,748	47.80	
Conservative	A. R. Jackson	6,228	38.43	
National Front	G. J. Acres	1,415	8.73	
Liberal	James G. Caple	818	5.05	
Turnout				
Labour hold		Swing		

=== 1981 election ===
The sixth and final election to the GLC (and third using revised boundaries) was held on 7 May 1981. The electorate was 40,512 and one Labour Party councillor was elected. The turnout was 43.9%. The councillor was elected for a four-year term, extended by an extra year by the Local Government (Interim Provisions) Act 1984, ahead of the abolition of the council.

1981 Greater London Council election: Battersea North
Party	Candidate	Votes	%	±%
Labour	Gladys Felicia Dimson	11,143	62.64	
Conservative	Margaret Riddell	4,760	26.77	
Liberal	James G. Caple	981	5.51	
National Front	Michael J. Salt	493	2.77	
Ecology	Paul W. Ekins	299	1.68	
Workers Revolutionary	Sandra Baker	70	0.39	
South London Action Group	Ralston L. Winn	43	0.24	
Turnout				
Labour hold		Swing		

=== 1985 by-election ===
A by-election was held on 27 June 1985, following the resignation of Gladys F. Dimson. The electorate was 41,454 and one Labour Party councillor was elected. The turnout was 23.1%.

Battersea North by-election, 1985
Party	Candidate	Votes	%	±%
Labour	J. V. N. Lucas	7,321	76.33	
Alliance	S. J. Pearson	1,877	19.56	
Ecology	S. G. Willington	397	4.14	
Turnout				
Labour hold		Swing		
