= Highbury East =

Electoral ward in the London Borough of Islington

- Former electoral ward for the Islington London Borough Council
- Highbury East ward boundaries from 2002 to 2022
- Borough: Islington
- County: Greater London
- Population: 11,634 (2011)
- Electorate: 9,083 (2018)

Former electoral ward
- Created: 2002
- Abolished: 2022
- Councillors: 3
- Replaced by: Highbury, Mildmay
- ONS code: 00AUGD
- GSS code: E05000372

Highbury East was an electoral ward in the London Borough of Islington from 2002 to 2022. The ward was first used in the 2002 elections and last used at the 2018 elections. It returned councillors to Islington London Borough Council.

== List of councillors ==
Term	Councillor	Party
2002–2006	David Barnes (Note: David Barnes changed parties in 2006)	Liberal Democrats
2002–2006	David Barnes	Conservative
2002–2010	Laura Willoughby	Liberal Democrats
2002–2014	Terry Stacy	Liberal Democrats
2006–2014	John Gilbert	Liberal Democrats
2010–2014	Julie Horten	Liberal Democrats
2014–2022	Osh Gantly	Labour
2014–2018	Aysegul Erdogan	Labour
2014–2022	Caroline Russell	Green
2018–2022	Sue Lukes	Labour

== Islington council elections ==
=== 2018 election ===
The election took place on 3 May 2018.

2018 Islington London Borough Council election: Highbury East
Party	Candidate	Votes	%	±%
Green	Caroline Russell	2,307	52.1	
Labour	Sue Lukes	1,641	37.0	
Labour	Osh Gantly	1,628	36.7	
Green	Benali Hamdache	1,555	35.1	
Labour	Chris Russell	1,546	34.9	
Green	Ernestas Jegorovas	1,533	34.6	
Liberal Democrats	Terry Stacy	887	20.0	
Liberal Democrats	Kate Pothalingam	775	17.5	
Liberal Democrats	Nathan Hill	575	13.0	
Conservative	Connor Coleman	239	5.4	
Conservative	Riddhi Bhalla	204	4.6	
Conservative	Jianjun Xi	142	3.2	
Turnout				
Green hold		Swing		
Labour hold		Swing		
Labour hold		Swing		

=== 2014 election ===
The election took place on 22 May 2014.

2014 Islington London Borough Council election: Highbury East
Party	Candidate	Votes	%	±%
Labour	Osh Gantly	1,514		
Labour	Aysegul Erdogan	1,430		
Green	Caroline Russell	1,214		
Labour	Muhammed Kalaam	1,206		
Liberal Democrats	Julie Horten	1,204		
Liberal Democrats	Terry Stacy	1,185		
Liberal Democrats	John Gilbert	1,138		
Green	Charlie Kiss	867		
Green	Susanna Rustin	721		
Conservative	Connor Coleman	411		
Conservative	Christopher Williams	375		
UKIP	Greg Clough	247		
Turnout		4,051	44.2	−23.4
Labour gain from Liberal Democrats		Swing		
Labour gain from Liberal Democrats		Swing		
Green gain from Liberal Democrats		Swing		

=== 2010 election ===
The election on 6 May 2010 took place on the same day as the United Kingdom general election.

2010 Islington London Borough Council election: Highbury East
Party	Candidate	Votes	%	±%
Liberal Democrats	Julie Horten	2,506		
Liberal Democrats	John Gilbert	2,484		
Liberal Democrats	Terry Stacy	2,160		
Labour	Matt Creamer	1,772		
Labour	Clare Jeapes	1,747		
Labour	Regine Kaseki	1,391		
Green	Emma Dixon	1,117		
Conservative	Stephen Brindle	837		
Conservative	James Barker	809		
Conservative	Neil Lindsay	733		
Green	Andrew Myer	657		
Green	James Humphreys	639		
Turnout		16,852	67.6	+31.1
Liberal Democrats hold		Swing		
Liberal Democrats hold		Swing		
Liberal Democrats hold		Swing		

=== 2006 election ===
The election took place on 4 May 2006.

2006 Islington London Borough Council election: Highbury East
Party	Candidate	Votes	%	±%
Liberal Democrats	Laura Willoughby	976	33.9	
Liberal Democrats	Terry Stacy	870		
Liberal Democrats	John Gilbert	836		
Labour	Stephen Molyneaux	726	25.2	
Labour	Leo Schulz	726		
Labour	Michael Gilgunn	696		
Green	Emma Dixon	637	22.1	
Conservative	David Barnes	540	18.8	
Conservative	Martine Oborne	493		
Green	Andrew Myer	491		
Green	James Humphreys	479		
Conservative	Tim Newark	450		
Turnout		7,920	36.5	+3.2
Liberal Democrats gain from Conservative		Swing		
Liberal Democrats hold		Swing		
Liberal Democrats hold		Swing		

=== 2002 election ===
The election took place on 2 May 2002.

2002 Islington London Borough Council election: Highbury East
Party	Candidate	Votes	%	±%
Liberal Democrats	David Barnes	1,385		
Liberal Democrats	Laura Willoughby	1,378		
Liberal Democrats	Terry Stacy	1,307		
Labour	Theresa Debono	757		
Labour	Timothy Clark	730		
Labour	David Poyser	726		
Green	Christopher Ashby	378		
Green	Sara Meidan	317		
Green	Patricia Tuson	288		
Conservative	Mark Riddleston	152		
Conservative	John Wilkin	147		
Conservative	Tristan Rudgard	144		
Turnout		7,709	33.3	
Liberal Democrats win (new seat)				
Liberal Democrats win (new seat)				
Liberal Democrats win (new seat)				
