= Tollington =

- Electoral ward for the Islington London Borough Council
- Tollington ward boundaries since 2022
- Borough: Islington
- County: Greater London
- Population: 13,764 (2021) (Note: 2021 Census data reported for 2022 ward boundaries)
- Electorate: 9,695 (2022)
- Area: 0.8088 square kilometres (0.3123 sq mi)

Current electoral ward
- Created: 1965
- Councillors: 3
- GSS code: E05013712 (2022–present); E05000381 (2002–2022)
- ONS code: 00AUGN (2002–2022)

Tollington is an electoral ward in the London Borough of Islington. The ward was first used in the 1978 elections. It returns three councillors to Islington London Borough Council.

It is part of the Islington North constituency. The population of this ward at the 2011 Census was 13,211. The ward is represented by three councillors, whose elections are held every four years. The ward is a very safe Labour seat, and stayed Labour even during the years when Islington Council was won by the Liberal Democrats. As of 2022, the councillors are Mick Gilgunn, Anjna Khurana and Flora Williamson.

== Background ==
The ward is named after the only other place in the historic parish of Islington mentioned as a separate manor in the Domesday Book, in the old form Tolentone. The manor house was located beside present day Hornsey Road (known as Tollington Lane as late as 1740) and was purchased in 1271 by the priory of St John at Clerkenwell after which the manor's name fell into disuse.

== Islington council elections since 2022 ==
There was a revision of ward boundaries in Islington in 2022.

=== 2022 election ===
The election took place on 5 May 2022.

2022 Islington London Borough Council election: Tollington (3)
Party	Candidate	Votes	%	±%
Labour	Anjna Khurana	2,148	63.1	
Labour	Flora Suzanne Williamson	2,093	61.5	
Labour	Mick Gilgunn	2,018	59.3	
Green	Ann Boater	1,064	31.3	
Green	Jonathan Barnaby Ward	767	22.5	
Green	Robin Walter Latimer	710	20.9	
Liberal Democrats	Lidia Ivona Erlichman	286	8.4	
Liberal Democrats	Julian Thomas Gregory	256	7.5	
Liberal Democrats	Jame Alun Nicolov	234	6.9	
Conservative	Steve McMinnies	220	6.5	
Conservative	Andrea O'Halloran	214	6.3	
Conservative	Retha Mhach	203	6.0	
Turnout			36.2	
Labour win (new boundaries)				
Labour win (new boundaries)				
Labour win (new boundaries)				

== 2002–2022 Islington council elections ==
Tollington ward boundaries from 2002 to 2022

There was a revision of ward boundaries in Islington in 2002.

=== 2018 election ===
The election took place on 3 May 2018.

2018 Islington London Borough Council election: Tollington
Party	Candidate	Votes	%	±%
Labour	Anjna Khurana	2,764	71.8	
Labour	Richard Watts	2,727	70.8	
Labour	Flora Williamson	2,707	70.3	
Green	Lilli Geissendorfer	674	17.5	
Green	Robin Latimer	456	11.8	
Green	Zachary Gomperts-Mitchelson	380	9.9	
Liberal Democrats	Jane Nicolov	328	8.5	
Liberal Democrats	Julian Gregory	322	8.4	
Liberal Democrats	George Allan	278	7.2	
Conservative	Nicholas Bennett	216	5.6	
Conservative	Chris Williams	212	5.5	
Conservative	Stephen Ward	200	5.2	
Turnout				
Labour hold		Swing		
Labour hold		Swing		
Labour hold		Swing		

=== 2014 election ===
The election took place on 22 May 2014.

2014 Islington London Borough Council election: Tollington (3)
Party	Candidate	Votes	%	±%
Labour	Richard Watts	2,355		
Labour	Flora Williamson	2,320		
Labour	Jean-Roger Kaseki	2,302		
Green	Ann Boater	1,006		
Green	Rosie Green	951		
Green	Stephen Horne	752		
Liberal Democrats	Ruth Polling	400		
Liberal Democrats	George Allan	393		
Liberal Democrats	David Thorpe	313		
Turnout		3,525	38.2	−22.3
Labour hold		Swing		
Labour hold		Swing		
Labour hold		Swing		

=== 2010 election ===
The election on 6 May 2010 took place on the same day as the United Kingdom general election.

2010 Islington London Borough Council election: Tollington (3)
Party	Candidate	Votes	%	±%
Labour	Catherine West	2,476		
Labour	Richard Watts	2,350		
Labour	Jean-Roger Kaseki	2,263		
Liberal Democrats	Alexander Ollier	1,604		
Liberal Democrats	Juliet Makhapila	1,466		
Liberal Democrats	Robert Smith	1,425		
Green	Ann Boater	1,199		
Green	Carina Dunkerley	1,044		
Green	Stephen Horne	883		
Conservative	Alex Gregg	732		
Conservative	Robert Millen	642		
Conservative	Christopher Williams	547		
Turnout		16,631	60.5	+26.5
Labour hold		Swing		
Labour hold		Swing		
Labour hold		Swing		

=== 2006 election ===
The election took place on 4 May 2006.

2006 Islington London Borough Council election: Tollington (3)
Party	Candidate	Votes	%	±%
Labour	Catherine Elizabeth West	1,338	45.8	
Labour	Richard Charles Watts	1,312		
Labour	Daniel Robert Hulls	1,270		
Liberal Democrats	Khalid Said Oumar	827	28.3	
Liberal Democrats	Harriet Ellen Richmond	790		
Liberal Democrats	David Charles Tibbs	757		
Green	Alison Ann Boater	531	18.2	
Green	Peter William Jones	429		
Green	Christine Fiona Muirhead	408		
Conservative	Duncan Philip Connors	226	7.7	
Conservative	Fraser Anthony Crawford	222		
Conservative	Maria Psatha	183		
Turnout		8,293	34.0	+8.5
Labour hold		Swing		
Labour hold		Swing		
Labour hold		Swing		

=== 2002 election ===
The election took place on 2 May 2002.

2002 Islington London Borough Council election: Tollington (3)
Party	Candidate	Votes	%	±%
Labour	Daniel Bonner	1,185		
Labour	Derek Sawyer	1,176		
Labour	Catherine West	1,168		
Save Arthur Simpson Library	Jonathan Rutherford	437		
Green	Alison Boater	364		
Liberal Democrats	Robert Smith	356		
Liberal Democrats	Alanna Coombes	325		
Green	Denise Bennett	319		
Liberal Democrats	Mark Platt	304		
Green	Robin Latimer	245		
Socialist Alliance	Eric Bailey	191		
Turnout		6,070	25.5	
Labour win (new boundaries)				
Labour win (new boundaries)				
Labour win (new boundaries)				

== 1978–2002 Islington council elections ==
Tollington ward boundaries from 1978 to 1994

There was a revision of ward boundaries in Islington in 1978. There was a very minor adjustment to the Tollington ward boundary in 1994.
