= Bunhill (ward) =

Electoral division in the London Borough of Islington

- Electoral ward for the Islington London Borough Council
- Bunhill ward boundaries since 2022
- Borough: Islington
- County: Greater London
- Population: 11,164 (2021) (Note: 2021 Census data reported for 2022 ward boundaries)
- Electorate: 7,159 (2022)
- Major settlements: St Luke's
- Area: 0.8542 square kilometres (0.3298 sq mi)

Current electoral ward
- Created: 1965
- Number of members: 1965–1978: 2; 1978–present: 3
- Councillors: Troy Gallagher; Phil Graham; Valerie Bossman-Quarshie
- GSS code: E05013699 (2022–present)

Bunhill is an electoral ward in the London Borough of Islington. The ward has existed since the creation of the borough on 1 April 1965 and was first used in the 1964 elections. It returns councillors to Islington London Borough Council.

== Islington council elections since 2022 ==
There was a revision of ward boundaries in Islington in 2022.

=== 2022 election ===
The election took place on 5 May 2022.

2022 Islington London Borough Council election: Bunhill (3)
Party	Candidate	Votes	%	±%
Labour	Valerie Bossman-Quarshie	1,277	61.5	
Labour	Troy Gallagher	1,174	56.6	
Labour	Phil Graham	1,057	50.9	
Green	Catherine Louise Webb	382	18.4	
Conservative	Max Campbell	379	18.3	
Conservative	Zak Vora	337	16.2	
Conservative	Alyson Theresa Prince	336	16.2	
Green	Andrew Richard Myer	285	13.7	
Liberal Democrats	John Kenny	252	12.1	
Liberal Democrats	Adrian Charles Reeves Hall	245	11.8	
Green	Andrew Tobert	210	10.1	
Liberal Democrats	Robert Minikin	206	9.9	
Reform	David Angus Small	51	2.5	
SDP	Jake Painter	34	1.6	
Turnout			30.3	
Labour hold		Swing		
Labour hold		Swing		
Labour hold		Swing		

== 2002–2022 Islington council elections ==
Bunhill ward boundaries from 2002 to 2022

There was a revision of ward boundaries in Islington in 2002.

=== 2021 by-election ===
The by-election took place on 6 May 2021, following the resignation of Claudia Webbe. It was held on the same day as the 2021 London mayoral election and 2021 London Assembly election.

2021 Bunhill by-election
Party	Candidate	Votes	%	±%
Labour	Valerie Bossman-Quarshie	1,960	48.4	−4.7
Conservative	Zak Vora	744	18.4	+3.9
Green	Catherine Webb	590	14.6	+1.9
Liberal Democrats	Maxx Turing	572	14.1	+2.0
Independent	Martyn Perks	181	4.5	+4.5
Majority		1,216	30.0	
Turnout		4,047		
Labour hold		Swing		

=== 2018 election ===
The election took place on 3 May 2018.

2018 Islington London Borough Council election: Bunhill (3)
Party	Candidate	Votes	%	±%
Labour	Troy Gallagher	1,832	56.9	
Labour	Phil Graham	1,725	53.5	
Labour	Claudia Webbe	1,704	52.9	
Conservative	Orson Francescone	501	15.5	
Conservative	Mick Collins	473	14.7	
Green	Sebastian Sandys	439	13.6	
Green	Catherine Webb	437	13.6	
Liberal Democrats	Adrian Hall	417	12.9	
Green	Ben Hickey	413	12.8	
Liberal Democrats	Pat Treacy	364	11.3	
Conservative	Mark Lim	345	10.7	
Liberal Democrats	Tom Hemsley	339	10.5	
UKIP	Pete Muswell	163	5.1	
Democrats and Veterans	Jake Painter	98	3.0	
Turnout				
Labour hold		Swing		
Labour hold		Swing		
Labour hold		Swing		

=== 2014 election ===
The election took place on 22 May 2014.

2014 Islington London Borough Council election: Bunhill
Party	Candidate	Votes	%	±%
Labour	Troy Gallagher	1,762		
Labour	Claudia Webbe	1,663		
Labour	Robert Khan	1,541		
Conservative	Craig John Francis Barber	663		
Conservative	Flora Nancy Joyce Plumstead Coleman	618		
Conservative	Orson Francescone	570		
UKIP	Peter Spencer Muswell	525		
Green	Tom Bowker	455		
Green	Leigh Elston	429		
Green	Ben Hickey	425		
Liberal Democrats	Joseph Russell Trotter	352		
Liberal Democrats	Adrian Charles Reeves Hall	321		
Liberal Democrats	Kelly Ann-Marie Wright	308		
Turnout		3,535	33.8	−21.8
Labour hold		Swing		
Labour hold		Swing		
Labour hold		Swing		

=== 2010 election ===
The election on 6 May 2010 took place on the same day as the United Kingdom general election.

2010 Islington London Borough Council election: Bunhill (3)
Party	Candidate	Votes	%	±%
Labour	Claudia Webbe	2,177		
Labour	Troy Gallagher	2,056		
Labour	Robert Khan	1,812		
Liberal Democrats	Adrian Hall	1,745		
Liberal Democrats	Peter Muswell	1,702		
Liberal Democrats	Jyoti Vaja	1,623		
Conservative	Michael Moulder	1,119		
Conservative	Michael Bull	1,095		
Conservative	Sky Ciantar	950		
Green	Alison Hood	596		
Green	Rosalind Sharper	399		
Green	Adam Stacey	272		
BNP	Walter Barfoot	257		
Turnout		15,803	55.6	+26.2
Labour gain from Liberal Democrats		Swing		
Labour gain from Liberal Democrats		Swing		
Labour gain from Liberal Democrats		Swing		

=== 2006 election ===
The election took place on 4 May 2006.

2006 Islington London Borough Council election: Bunhill (3)
Party	Candidate	Votes	%	±%
Liberal Democrats	Donna Boffa	777	30.5	
Liberal Democrats	Ruth Polling	719		
Liberal Democrats	Jyoti Vaja	708		
Labour	Simon Charles	644	25.3	
Labour	Troy Gallagher	643		
Ind. Working Class	Ben Mackmurdie	566	22.2	
Labour	Samuel McBratney	563		
Ind. Working Class	Gary O'Shea	544		
Ind. Working Class	Andy Taylor	504		
Conservative	Guy Black	316	12.4	
Conservative	Nicholas Sheffield	300		
Conservative	Eve Gannon	291		
Green	Damien O'Farrell	247	9.7	
Green	Lyn Bliss	202		
Green	Angela Thomson	164		
Turnout		7,188	29.4	+8.7
Liberal Democrats hold		Swing		
Liberal Democrats hold		Swing		
Liberal Democrats hold		Swing		

=== 2002 election ===
The election took place on 2 May 2002.

2002 Islington London Borough Council election: Bunhill (3)
Party	Candidate	Votes	%	±%
Liberal Democrats	Joseph Trotter	942		
Liberal Democrats	Jyoti Vaja	909		
Liberal Democrats	Rosetta Wooding	908		
Labour	Jeremy Breaks	430		
Labour	Daniel Neidle	377		
Labour	William Croucher	355		
Independent	David Warby	185		
Green	Angela Thomson	154		
Conservative	John Brimacombe	118		
Conservative	Joseph Goldsmith	111		
Conservative	Nigel Watts	102		
Turnout		4,591	20.7	
Liberal Democrats win (new boundaries)				
Liberal Democrats win (new boundaries)				
Liberal Democrats win (new boundaries)				

== 1994–2002 Islington council elections ==
The boundaries of the ward were adjusted on 1 April 1994. In the Barbican area, the Golden Lane Estate (population 750) was transferred from the Bunhill ward in Islington to the Cripplegate ward in the City of London.

=== 1998 election ===
The election took place on 7 May 1998.

1998 Islington London Borough Council election: Bunhill (3)
Party	Candidate	Votes	%	±%
Liberal Democrats	Joseph Trotter	1,317		
Liberal Democrats	Rosetta Wooding	1,236		
Liberal Democrats	Jyoti Vaja	1,176		
Labour	Ian Darby	555		
Labour	Theresa Debono	487		
Labour	Hassan Asmal	480		
Socialist Labour	Sharon Hayward	154		
Green	Denise Bennett	94		
Conservative	Peter Cuthbert	78		
Conservative	Doris Daly	76		
Conservative	Alam-Zeb Khan	71		
Turnout		5,724		
Liberal Democrats gain from Labour		Swing		
Liberal Democrats gain from Labour		Swing		
Liberal Democrats hold		Swing		

== 1978–1994 Islington council elections ==
Bunhill ward boundaries from 1978 to 1994

There was a revision of ward boundaries in Islington in 1978.

== 1964–1978 Islington council elections ==
=== 1964 election ===
The election took place on 7 May 1964.

Bunhill (2)
Party	Candidate	Votes	%	±%
Labour	C. Payne	979		
Labour	A. A. Goldshaw	947		
Conservative	L. M. Baycock	250		
Conservative	W. D. Barrett	246		
Communist	F. O'Shea	124		
Liberal	E. Hull	114		
Liberal	S. Raphael	103		
Independent Communist	I. Kenna	79		
Turnout		1,479	23.3	
Labour win (new seat)				
Labour win (new seat)				
