= Bunhill =

Bunhill may refer to several locations in Islington, London, England:

- Bunhill Fields, a former burial ground
- Bunhill Row, a street running along the west side of Bunhill Fields
- Bunhill (ward), an electoral ward in Islington
