= 1998 Islington London Borough Council election =

1998 local election in England

- 7 May 1998

All 52 seats up for election to Islington London Borough Council 27 seats needed for a majority
- Registered: 118,034
- Turnout: 42,096, 35.66% (▼7.66)

| | First party | Second party |
|---|---|---|
| Party | Liberal Democrats | Labour |
| Last election | 12 seats, 29.14% | 39 seats, 52.49% |
| Seats before | 13 | 38 |
| Seats won | 26 | 26 |
| Seat change | ▲13 | ▼12 |
| Popular vote | 44,391 | 43,388 |
| Percentage | 43.98% | 42.99% |
| Swing | ▲14.84 | ▼9.50 |
| | Third party | Fourth party |
| Party | Conservative | Green |
| Last election | 1 seat, 12.47% | 0 seats, 3.06% |
| Seats before | 1 | 0 |
| Seats won | 0 | 0 |
| Seat change | ▼1 | Steady |
| Popular vote | 6,369 | 6,366 |
| Percentage | 6.31% | 6.31% |
| Swing | ▼6.16 | ▲3.25 |
Council control before election
Labour
Council control after election
No Overall Control

The 1998 Islington Council election took place on 7 May 1998 to elect members of Islington London Borough Council in London, England. The whole council was up for election and the Labour Party lost overall control of the council to no overall control.

== Election result ==
The results saw the Labour and Liberal Democrat parties finish tied on 26 seats each, after the Liberal Democrats gained 12 seats. The Liberal Democrat gains included taking the ward of Barnsbury, where the then Prime Minister Tony Blair had lived before becoming prime minister. In the final seat Labour won by 3 votes after 5 recounts to prevent the Liberal Democrats from winning a majority. This meant Labour was able to continue as the administration, relying on the casting vote of the Labour mayor Pat Haynes.

Reasons for the losses for Labour were reported as being the council tax level, which was the highest in London, poor schools and the council's £800 million debt.

At the same as the election Islington voted 81.55% in favour of the 1998 Greater London Authority referendum and 18.45% against, on a 34.15% turnout.

Islington local election result 1998
| Party | Seats | Gains | Losses | Net gain/loss | Seats % | Votes % | Votes | +/− |
|---|---|---|---|---|---|---|---|---|
| Liberal Democrats | 26 | 14 | 1 | ▲13 | 50.00 | 43.98 | 44,391 | ▲14.84 |
| Labour | 26 | 1 | 13 | ▼12 | 50.00 | 42.99 | 43,388 | ▼9.50 |
| Conservative | 0 | 0 | 1 | ▼1 | 0.00 | 6.31 | 6,369 | ▼6.16 |
| Green | 0 | 0 | 0 | Steady | 0.00 | 6.31 | 6,366 | ▲3.25 |
| Socialist Labour | 0 | 0 | 0 | Steady | 0.00 | 0.15 | 154 | New |
| Independent | 0 | 0 | 0 | Steady | 0.00 | 0.13 | 135 | ▼0.54 |
| Tenants & Residents | 0 | 0 | 0 | Steady | 0.00 | 0.13 | 131 | ▼2.04 |
| Total | 52 | | | | | | 100,934 | |

== Ward results ==
(*) - Indicates an incumbent candidate

(†) - Indicates an incumbent candidate standing in a different ward

=== Barnsbury ===
Barnsbury (3)
| Party | Candidate | Votes | % | ±% |
|---|---|---|---|---|
| Liberal Democrats | Bridget Fox | 1,725 | 54.28 | ▲30.22 |
| Liberal Democrats | Alastair Loraine | 1,623 | | |
| Liberal Democrats | Carol Powell | 1,575 | | |
| Labour | Paula Kahn | 929 | 30.21 | ▼27.34 |
| Labour | Steven Barnett | 914 | | |
| Labour | Lloyd Child | 897 | | |
| Green | Robert Pearce | 211 | 6.98 | New |
| Conservative | Christopher Cox | 174 | 4.20 | ▼14.19 |
| Tenants & Residents | John Worker | 131 | 4.33 | New |
| Conservative | Martin Moyes | 111 | | |
| Conservative | Jonathan Small | 96 | | |
| Registered electors | | 6,761 | | ▲254 |
| Turnout | | 2,978 | 44.05 | ▼0.04 |
| Rejected ballots | | 17 | 0.57 | ▲0.08 |
| Liberal Democrats gain from Labour | | | | |
| Liberal Democrats gain from Labour | | | | |
| Liberal Democrats gain from Labour | | | | |

=== Bunhill ===
Bunhill (3)
| Party | Candidate | Votes | % | ±% |
|---|---|---|---|---|
| Liberal Democrats | Joseph Trotter* | 1,317 | 59.95 | ▲0.31 |
| Liberal Democrats | Rosetta Wooding* | 1,236 | | |
| Liberal Democrats | Jyoti Vaja | 1,176 | | |
| Labour | Ian Darby | 555 | 24.47 | ▼10.29 |
| Labour | Theresa Debono | 487 | | |
| Labour | Hassan Asmal | 480 | | |
| Socialist Labour | Sharon Hayward | 154 | 7.43 | New |
| Green | Denise Bennett | 94 | 4.53 | New |
| Conservative | Peter Cuthbert | 78 | 3.62 | ▼1.98 |
| Conservative | Doris Daly | 76 | | |
| Conservative | Alam-Zeb Khan | 71 | | |
| Registered electors | | 5,460 | | ▼377 |
| Turnout | | 2,118 | 38.79 | ▼9.25 |
| Rejected ballots | | 8 | 0.38 | ▲0.34 |
| Liberal Democrats hold | | | | |
| Liberal Democrats hold | | | | |
| Liberal Democrats hold | | | | |

=== Canonbury East ===
Canonbury East (2)
| Party | Candidate | Votes | % | ±% |
|---|---|---|---|---|
| Liberal Democrats | Jonathan Dearth | 1,101 | 56.48 | ▲33.59 |
| Liberal Democrats | Richard Washington | 1,026 | | |
| Labour | Andrew Bosi* | 750 | 35.16 | ▼1.25 |
| Labour | Peter Lewis | 574 | | |
| Green | Judith Kleinman | 92 | 4.88 | ▼1.39 |
| Conservative | Timothy Devlin | 72 | 3.48 | ▼0.20 |
| Conservative | Duncan Reed | 59 | | |
| Registered electors | | 4,998 | | ▲29 |
| Turnout | | 2,015 | 40.32 | ▼4.94 |
| Rejected ballots | | 10 | 0.50 | ▲0.32 |
| Liberal Democrats gain from Labour | | | | |
| Liberal Democrats gain from Labour | | | | |

=== Canonbury West ===
Canonbury West (2)
| Party | Candidate | Votes | % | ±% |
|---|---|---|---|---|
| Liberal Democrats | Angela Ribezzo | 985 | 59.71 | ▲40.34 |
| Liberal Democrats | Barbara Smith | 955 | | |
| Labour | Diane Brace | 544 | 31.52 | ▼18.74 |
| Labour | Nicholas Stewart | 480 | | |
| Conservative | Carol-Anne Aitken | 89 | 5.45 | ▼18.45 |
| Conservative | Richard Campbell | 88 | | |
| Green | Robert Turner | 54 | 3.32 | ▼3.15 |
| Registered electors | | 4,153 | | ▼29 |
| Turnout | | 1,750 | 42.14 | ▼1.48 |
| Rejected ballots | | 23 | 1.31 | ▲1.09 |
| Liberal Democrats gain from Labour | | | | |
| Liberal Democrats gain from Labour | | | | |

=== Clerkenwell ===
Clerkenwell (3)
| Party | Candidate | Votes | % | ±% |
|---|---|---|---|---|
| Liberal Democrats | Sarah Ludford* | 1,783 | 59.29 | ▲0.22 |
| Liberal Democrats | Bruce Neave* | 1,449 | | |
| Liberal Democrats | George Allan | 1,427 | | |
| Labour | Timothy Clark | 762 | 25.58 | ▼0.94 |
| Labour | Harriet Quiney | 672 | | |
| Labour | David Northcott | 576 | | |
| Green | Raymond Cunningham | 259 | 9.89 | New |
| Conservative | Gordon Dear | 162 | 5.24 | ▲1.29 |
| Conservative | Nicholas Roberts | 132 | | |
| Conservative | Margaret Reese | 118 | | |
| Registered electors | | 7,908 | | ▲627 |
| Turnout | | 2,771 | 35.04 | ▼12.77 |
| Rejected ballots | | 15 | 0.54 | ▲0.17 |
| Liberal Democrats hold | | | | |
| Liberal Democrats hold | | | | |
| Liberal Democrats hold | | | | |

=== Gillespie ===
Gillespie (2)
| Party | Candidate | Votes | % | ±% |
|---|---|---|---|---|
| Labour | Richard Greening* | 966 | 55.30 | ▼9.91 |
| Labour | Nigel Mason | 751 | | |
| Liberal Democrats | Philip Middleton | 336 | 20.87 | ▲7.43 |
| Liberal Democrats | Elizabeth Rorison | 312 | | |
| Green | Sara Meidan | 276 | 17.78 | ▲5.68 |
| Conservative | John Shields | 101 | 6.05 | ▼3.20 |
| Conservative | Rifat Bairam | 87 | | |
| Registered electors | | 4,471 | | ▲453 |
| Turnout | | 1,540 | 34.44 | ▼8.39 |
| Rejected ballots | | 22 | 1.43 | ▲1.14 |
| Labour hold | | | | |
| Labour hold | | | | |

=== Highbury ===
Highbury (3)
| Party | Candidate | Votes | % | ±% |
|---|---|---|---|---|
| Labour | Mary Creagh | 1,107 | 48.69 | ▲5.13 |
| Labour | Maureen Leigh^{†} (Note: Leigh was a sitting councillor representing the Highview ward) | 1,052 | | |
| Labour | Jenny Rathbone | 1,033 | | |
| Green | Christopher Ashby | 748 | 27.20 | ▲0.49 |
| Green | Malcolm Powell | 522 | | |
| Green | Patricia Tuson | 513 | | |
| Liberal Democrats | Kathleen Williams | 330 | 14.70 | ▼2.07 |
| Liberal Democrats | Mark Hornby | 321 | | |
| Liberal Democrats | Sheila Thornton | 313 | | |
| Conservative | Andrew Brooke | 227 | 9.41 | ▼0.97 |
| Conservative | Jean-Paul Floru | 199 | | |
| Conservative | James Barbaras | 191 | | |
| Registered electors | | 6,951 | | ▲696 |
| Turnout | | 2,475 | 35.61 | ▼5.51 |
| Rejected ballots | | 14 | 0.57 | ▲0.41 |
| Labour hold | | | | |
| Labour hold | | | | |
| Labour hold | | | | |

=== Highview ===
Highview (2)
| Party | Candidate | Votes | % | ±% |
|---|---|---|---|---|
| Labour | Ruairi McCourt | 766 | 64.16 | ▼5.46 |
| Labour | Jennifer Sands | 720 | | |
| Green | Michael Holloway | 223 | 16.93 | ▲6.71 |
| Liberal Democrats | Jonathan Griffiths | 177 | 14.03 | ▲4.08 |
| Green | Michele Wilson | 169 | | |
| Liberal Democrats | Ursula Craig | 148 | | |
| Conservative | Simon Matthews | 58 | 4.88 | ▼5.34 |
| Conservative | Bruce Picking | 55 | | |
| Registered electors | | 3,875 | | ▲122 |
| Turnout | | 1,261 | 32.54 | ▼7.85 |
| Rejected ballots | | 20 | 1.59 | ▲1.06 |
| Labour hold | | | | |
| Labour hold | | | | |

=== Hillmarton ===
Hillmarton (2)
| Party | Candidate | Votes | % | ±% |
|---|---|---|---|---|
| Liberal Democrats | Doreen Scott | 1,028 | 49.93 | ▲30.02 |
| Liberal Democrats | Edward Featherstone | 998 | | |
| Labour | Antonia Benedek | 781 | 38.47 | ▼26.72 |
| Labour | Phil Kelly * | 780 | | |
| Green | Mark Chilver | 165 | 8.13 | New |
| Conservative | Roy Taft | 82 | 3.47 | ▼11.44 |
| Conservative | Mahendra Oza | 59 | | |
| Registered electors | | 4,913 | | ▼222 |
| Turnout | | 2,111 | 42.97 | ▼2.37 |
| Rejected ballots | | 7 | 0.33 | ▲0.14 |
| Liberal Democrats gain from Labour | | | | |
| Liberal Democrats gain from Labour | | | | |

=== Hillrise ===
Hillrise (3)
| Party | Candidate | Votes | % | ±% |
|---|---|---|---|---|
| Labour | Alan Clinton* | 1,036 | 54.23 | ▼7.76 |
| Labour | Milton Babulall^{†} (Note: Babulall was a sitting councillor representing the Highbury ward) | 948 | | |
| Labour | Sheila Camp | 940 | | |
| Liberal Democrats | Heather Eggins | 426 | 20.86 | ▲5.78 |
| Liberal Democrats | James Sanderson | 371 | | |
| Liberal Democrats | Philip Vaughan | 328 | | |
| Conservative | Maureen Campbell | 255 | 10.72 | ▲2.83 |
| Green | Victoria Olliver | 255 | 14.19 | ▲4.81 |
| Conservative | Simon Cooper | 180 | | |
| Conservative | Bryan Wilsher | 143 | | |
| Registered electors | | 6,600 | | ▲276 |
| Turnout | | 1,846 | 27.97 | ▼10.28 |
| Rejected ballots | | 6 | 0.33 | ▲0.08 |
| Labour hold | | | | |
| Labour hold | | | | |
| Labour hold | | | | |

=== Holloway ===
Holloway (3)
| Party | Candidate | Votes | % | ±% |
|---|---|---|---|---|
| Liberal Democrats | Margot Dunn* | 1,338 | 54.91 | ▲6.69 |
| Liberal Democrats | Barry Kempton* | 1,290 | | |
| Liberal Democrats | Douglas Taylor* | 1,262 | | |
| Labour | Catriona Munro | 838 | 35.23 | ▼7.52 |
| Labour | David Sayer | 830 | | |
| Labour | Robert Dowd | 828 | | |
| Green | Sheena Etches | 138 | 5.85 | ▲0.76 |
| Conservative | Alan Reese | 99 | 4.01 | ▲0.07 |
| Conservative | Mark Rittner | 94 | | |
| Conservative | James Rooke | 91 | | |
| Registered electors | | 6,258 | | ▲203 |
| Turnout | | 2,550 | 40.75 | ▼8.76 |
| Rejected ballots | | 13 | 0.51 | ▲0.41 |
| Liberal Democrats hold | | | | |
| Liberal Democrats hold | | | | |
| Liberal Democrats hold | | | | |

=== Junction ===
Junction (3)
| Party | Candidate | Votes | % | ±% |
|---|---|---|---|---|
| Labour | Janet Burgess* (Note: Burgess was elected in a by-election trigerred by the resignation of Cllr Michael Tal after his resignation in 1997) | 1,104 | 55.30 | ▼7.04 |
| Labour | Taha Karim* | 940 | | |
| Labour | Sandra Marks* | 934 | | |
| Liberal Democrats | Margaret Lally | 430 | 20.35 | ▲6.39 |
| Liberal Democrats | Elizabeth Sidney | 347 | | |
| Liberal Democrats | Alford Reeves | 319 | | |
| Green | Angela Royston | 284 | 15.46 | ▲2.24 |
| Green | Ajay Burlingham-Johnson | 271 | | |
| Conservative | Charles Sharman | 167 | 8.89 | ▼1.59 |
| Conservative | Anthea Ward | 152 | | |
| Registered electors | | 6,487 | | ▼1 |
| Turnout | | 1,892 | 29.17 | ▼10.66 |
| Rejected ballots | | 13 | 0.69 | ▲0.23 |
| Labour hold | | | | |
| Labour hold | | | | |
| Labour hold | | | | |

=== Mildmay ===
Mildmay (3)
| Party | Candidate | Votes | % | ±% |
|---|---|---|---|---|
| Labour | Patrick Haynes* | 1,056 | 44.99 | ▼6.68 |
| Labour | Jeanette Arnold | 1,022 | | |
| Labour | Michael Boye-Anawomah* | 941 | | |
| Liberal Democrats | Anna Berent | 621 | 24.05 | ▲10.68 |
| Liberal Democrats | Andrew Crudgington | 500 | | |
| Liberal Democrats | Derek Jackson | 493 | | |
| Green | Grant Gilbert | 290 | 12.97 | ▲0.84 |
| Conservative | Adam Duguid | 277 | 11.95 | ▼10.89 |
| Conservative | Oriel Hutchinson | 273 | | |
| Conservative | Gary Moores | 252 | | |
| Independent | Margaret McDonnell | 135 | 6.04 | New |
| Registered electors | | 7,995 | | ▲406 |
| Turnout | | 2,075 | 25.95 | ▼12.45 |
| Rejected ballots | | 27 | 1.30 | ▲1.06 |
| Labour hold | | | | |
| Labour hold | | | | |
| Labour hold | | | | |

=== Quadrant ===
Quadrant (2)
| Party | Candidate | Votes | % | ±% |
|---|---|---|---|---|
| Liberal Democrats | David Barnes* (Note: Barnes was elected as a Labour councillor in 1994 but decided to run as a Liberal Democrat this election) | 1,161 | 51.84 | ▲44.99 |
| Liberal Democrats | Laura Willoughby | 992 | | |
| Labour | Philip Bird | 689 | 30.29 | ▼12.22 |
| Labour | Caspar Bowden | 569 | | |
| Conservative | Rebecca Baty | 274 | 12.35 | ▼31.92 |
| Conservative | Oliver Judge | 239 | | |
| Green | Susan Wilkinson | 141 | 5.52 | ▼0.85 |
| Green | Stefan Tobler | 88 | | |
| Registered electors | | 5,228 | | ▲129 |
| Turnout | | 2,213 | 42.33 | ▼8.13 |
| Rejected ballots | | 10 | 0.45 | ▲0.10 |
| Liberal Democrats gain from Conservative | | | | |
| Liberal Democrats gain from Labour | | | | |

=== St George's ===
St George's (3)
| Party | Candidate | Votes | % | ±% |
|---|---|---|---|---|
| Labour | Rosemary Blackmore | 1,357 | 52.97 | ▲3.47 |
| Labour | Walter Burgess | 1,165 | | |
| Labour | Shonagh Methven | 1,147 | | |
| Liberal Democrats | Jody Beveridge | 503 | 19.90 | ▲7.27 |
| Liberal Democrats | Paul Fox | 464 | | |
| Green | Mary Adshead | 450 | 19.49 | ▲6.46 |
| Liberal Democrats | Julian Glover | 411 | | |
| Conservative | Allan Saile | 216 | 7.64 | ▼2.88 |
| Conservative | Rosemarie Totvanian | 161 | | |
| Conservative | Glenn Timmermans | 152 | | |
| Registered electors | | 6,931 | | ▲310 |
| Turnout | | 2,246 | 32.41 | ▼6.47 |
| Rejected ballots | | 22 | 0.98 | ▲0.86 |
| Labour hold | | | | |
| Labour hold | | | | |
| Labour hold | | | | |

=== St Mary ===
St Mary (3)
| Party | Candidate | Votes | % | ±% |
|---|---|---|---|---|
| Liberal Democrats | Isobel Cox | 1,299 | 55.21 | ▲37.89 |
| Liberal Democrats | Joan Coupland | 1,298 | | |
| Liberal Democrats | Richard Heseltine | 1,272 | | |
| Labour | Jessica Bawden | 815 | 34.35 | ▼17.79 |
| Labour | Paul Convery* | 796 | | |
| Labour | Paul Jackson* | 796 | | |
| Green | Mjka Scott | 149 | 6.38 | ▼1.73 |
| Conservative | Tracey Braddick | 118 | 4.07 | ▼18.36 |
| Conservative | Stephen McMinnies | 88 | | |
| Conservative | Lisa Ruffell | 79 | | |
| Registered electors | | 5,894 | | ▲532 |
| Turnout | | 2,433 | 41.28 | ▼2.29 |
| Rejected ballots | | 12 | 0.49 | ▲0.23 |
| Liberal Democrats gain from Labour | | | | |
| Liberal Democrats gain from Labour | | | | |
| Liberal Democrats gain from Labour | | | | |

=== St Peter ===
St Peter (3)
| Party | Candidate | Votes | % | ±% |
|---|---|---|---|---|
| Liberal Democrats | Maria Powell* | 1,548 | 67.57 | ▲5.44 |
| Liberal Democrats | Stephen Hitchins* | 1,480 | | |
| Liberal Democrats | Christopher Pryce* | 1,373 | | |
| Labour | Paula Beattie | 515 | 20.35 | ▼12.99 |
| Labour | Nicholas Butcher | 460 | | |
| Labour | Jenina Pendry | 350 | | |
| Green | Ura Kiefer | 155 | 7.14 | New |
| Conservative | Thomas Duke | 138 | 4.94 | ▲0.42 |
| Conservative | Peter Warren | 94 | | |
| Conservative | Ian Sparham-Souter | 90 | | |
| Registered electors | | 6,599 | | ▲192 |
| Turnout | | 2,294 | 34.76 | ▼14.08 |
| Rejected ballots | | 8 | 0.35 | ▼0.13 |
| Liberal Democrats hold | | | | |
| Liberal Democrats hold | | | | |
| Liberal Democrats hold | | | | |

=== Sussex ===
Sussex (2)
| Party | Candidate | Votes | % | ±% |
|---|---|---|---|---|
| Labour | Meg Hillier* | 884 | 49.21 | ▼10.75 |
| Labour | Daniel Bonner | 859 | | |
| Liberal Democrats | Graham Baker* (Note: Baker was elected in a by-election triggered by the resignation of Cllr Stephen Twigg in 1997) | 856 | 44.47 | ▲12.35 |
| Liberal Democrats | Hewa Jaff | 719 | | |
| Green | Robin Latimer | 99 | 4.32 | ▼1.93 |
| Green | Swadesh Poorun | 54 | | |
| Conservative | Raymond Muggeridge | 38 | 2.00 | ▼2.67 |
| Conservative | John Wilkin | 33 | | |
| Registered electors | | 4,668 | | ▲273 |
| Turnout | | 1,926 | 41.26 | ▼7.05 |
| Rejected ballots | | 19 | 0.99 | ▲0.61 |
| Labour hold | | | | |
| Labour gain from Liberal Democrats | | | | |

=== Thornhill ===
Thornhill (2)
| Party | Candidate | Votes | % | ±% |
|---|---|---|---|---|
| Labour | Ian Perry | 828 | 53.58 | ▼9.99 |
| Labour | Edna Griffiths | 735 | | |
| Liberal Democrats | Patricia Peel | 411 | 26.98 | ▲10.53 |
| Liberal Democrats | Michael Aspell | 376 | | |
| Green | Nicola Baird | 143 | 9.81 | ▲2.37 |
| Conservative | Stanley Morris | 142 | 9.63 | ▼2.90 |
| Conservative | Stephen Kreppel | 139 | | |
| Registered electors | | 4,721 | | ▲232 |
| Turnout | | 1,588 | 33.64 | ▼8.98 |
| Rejected ballots | | 19 | 1.20 | ▲0.89 |
| Labour hold | | | | |
| Labour hold | | | | |

=== Tollington ===
Tollington (3)
| Party | Candidate | Votes | % | ±% |
|---|---|---|---|---|
| Labour | Roger McKenzie* | 1,178 | 59.68 | ▲1.43 |
| Labour | Barbara Sidnell | 1,149 | | |
| Labour | Derek Sawyer* | 1,103 | | |
| Liberal Democrats | Elizabeth Macmillan | 418 | 20.22 | ▲9.20 |
| Liberal Democrats | Matthew Ryan | 386 | | |
| Green | James Goggin | 385 | 20.09 | ▲8.84 |
| Liberal Democrats | David Tibbs | 358 | | |
| Registered electors | | 7,163 | | ▲326 |
| Turnout | | 2,014 | 28.12 | ▼8.90 |
| Rejected ballots | | 42 | 2.09 | ▲1.77 |
| Labour hold | | | | |
| Labour hold | | | | |
| Labour hold | | | | |
