= 2018 Islington London Borough Council election =

2018 local election in England

2018 Islington Council election
- 3 May 2018

All 48 council seats

	First party	Second party
Party	Labour	Green
Last election	47 seats, 55.9%	1 seats, 19.3%
Seats won	47	1
Seat change	Steady	Steady
Popular vote	102,352	27,728
Percentage	60.6%	16.4%
Swing	▲4.7%	▼2.9%
- Map of the results of the 2018 Islington council election. Greens in green and Labour in red.
Council control before election
Labour
Subsequent Council control
Labour

The 2018 Islington Borough Council election took place on 3 May 2018 to elect members of Islington London Borough Council in England. This was on the same day as other local elections. The council had previously had elections in 2014. The Labour Party retained control of the council, winning 47 of the 48 seats. The sole non-Labour councillor elected was Caroline Russell of the Green Party.

== Election result ==
Islington Council Election Result 2018
Party	Seats	Gains	Losses	Net gain/loss	Seats %	Votes %	Votes	+/−
Labour	47	0	0	0	97.9	60.6	102,352	+4.7
Green	1	0	0	0	2.1	16.4	27,728	−2.9
Liberal Democrats	0	0	0	0	0.0	12.3	20,785	−2.3
Conservative	0	0	0	0	0.0	9.7	16,414	+0.3
Women's Equality	0	0	0	0	0.0	0.7	1,262	New
UKIP	0	0	0	0	0.0	0.1	244	-0.5
Democrats and Veterans	0	0	0	0	0.0	0.1	98	New
Socialist (GB)	0	0	0	0	0.0	0.0	52	New

== Ward results ==
=== Barnsbury ===
Barnsbury
Party	Candidate	Votes	%	±%
Labour	Rowena Champion	1,820	56.6	−1.8
Labour	Jilani Chowdhury	1,661	51.6	−2.3
Labour	Mouna Hamitouche	1,661	51.6	−1.3
Conservative	Edward Waldegrave	622	19.3	−0.3
Conservative	Imogen Atkinson	611	19.0	+2.3
Liberal Democrats	Natasha Broke	595	18.5	+7.4
Conservative	Peng Chou	555	17.3	+0.9
Green	Carmela Jones	455	14.1	+1.2
Liberal Democrats	Brian Tjugum	447	13.9	+5.3
Liberal Democrats	Imogen Wall	406	12.6	+4.7
Green	Jill Renwick	295	9.2	−3.2
Green	Roger Kitsis	287	8.9	−0.1
Turnout				
Labour hold		Swing		
Labour hold		Swing		
Labour hold		Swing		

=== Bunhill ===
Bunhill
Party	Candidate	Votes	%	±%
Labour	Troy Gallagher	1,832	56.9	+7.1
Labour	Phil Graham	1,725	53.5	+9.9
Labour	Claudia Webbe	1,704	52.9	+5.9
Conservative	Orson Francescone	501	15.5	−0.6
Conservative	Mick Collins	473	14.7	−4.1
Green	Sebastian Sandys	439	13.6	+0.7
Green	Catherine Webb	437	13.6	+1.5
Liberal Democrats	Adrian Hall	417	12.9	+3.8
Green	Ben Hickey	413	12.8	+0.8
Liberal Democrats	Pat Treacy	364	11.3	+1.3
Conservative	Mark Lim	345	10.7	−6.8
Liberal Democrats	Tom Hemsley	339	10.5	+1.8
UKIP	Pete Muswell	163	5.1	−9.8
Democrats and Veterans	Jake Painter	98	3.0	N/A
Turnout				
Labour hold		Swing		
Labour hold		Swing		
Labour hold		Swing		

=== Caledonian ===
Caledonian
Party	Candidate	Votes	%	±%
Labour	Paul Convery	2,158	67.5	+1.4
Labour	Sara Hyde	2,149	67.2	+12.8
Labour	Una O'Halloran	2,011	62.9	+9.8
Conservative	Peter Balchin	405	12.7	+0.6
Green	Alex Gordon	389	12.2	−6.5
Conservative	Stuart Cottis	365	11.4	−2.3
Conservative	Ashley Durwood-Thomas	334	10.4	−1.2
Liberal Democrats	Tricia Peel	329	10.3	−0.3
Liberal Democrats	Emma Borroff	314	9.8	+0.9
Green	Hannah Graham	307	9.6	−6.7
Green	Morgan Phillips	284	8.9	−3.4
Liberal Democrats	Hamir Patel	252	7.9	+0.9
Turnout				
Labour hold		Swing		
Labour hold		Swing		
Labour hold		Swing		

=== Canonbury ===
Canonbury
Party	Candidate	Votes	%	±%
Labour	Clare Jeapes	1,828	60.9	+14.6
Labour	John Woolf	1,725	57.5	+10.9
Labour	Nick Wayne	1,708	56.9	+14.9
Liberal Democrats	Barbara Smith	465	15.5	−5.8
Conservative	Louise Coleman	461	15.4	+1.5
Green	Talia Hussain	444	14.8	+1.0
Conservative	Henry Bunbury	422	14.1	+1.0
Liberal Democrats	Phil Stevens	369	12.3	−11.6
Green	Jonathan Wright	367	12.2	−1.6
Conservative	Mat Ilic	352	11.7	−0.7
Liberal Democrats	Ketish Pothalingam	352	11.7	−6.5
Green	Richard Halvorsen	297	9.9	−1.7
Turnout				
Labour hold		Swing		
Labour hold		Swing		
Labour hold		Swing		

=== Clerkenwell ===
Clerkenwell
Party	Candidate	Votes	%	±%
Labour	Ben Mackmurdie	1,568	58.1	+9.3
Labour	Kadeema Woodbyrne	1,487	55.1	+11.3
Labour	Matt Nathan	1,471	54.5	+11.0
Liberal Democrats	Sarah Ludford	479	17.7	−4.0
Liberal Democrats	Catriona McDougall	409	15.2	−6.2
Conservative	Laura Grayling	376	13.9	−3.7
Conservative	Simon Bone	372	13.8	−1.4
Green	Rosemary Sonnenschein	358	13.3	−5.5
Conservative	Walter Balmford	356	13.2	N/A
Liberal Democrats	Alan Muhammed	355	13.2	−4.4
Green	Cecilie Hestbaek	310	11.5	−2.8
Green	Miranda Perfitt	267	9.9	−2.5
UKIP	Charlotte Whitmore	81	3.0	N/A
Turnout				
Labour hold		Swing		
Labour hold		Swing		
Labour hold		Swing		

=== Finsbury Park ===
Finsbury Park
Party	Candidate	Votes	%	±%
Labour	Gary Heather	3,043	75.6	+9.3
Labour	Asima Shaikh	2,962	73.6	+13.3
Labour	Mick O'Sullivan	2,873	71.4	+9.3
Green	Ann Boater	608	15.1	−8.6
Green	Simon Carter	414	10.3	−9.3
Green	Nafisah Graham-Brown	408	10.1	−9.2
Liberal Democrats	Valentina Giordano	320	8.0	−2.0
Liberal Democrats	Matthew Phillips	250	6.2	−2.8
Liberal Democrats	Pierre Hausemer	244	6.1	−1.9
Conservative	Rachael Henry	216	5.4	N/A
Conservative	Brian McDonnell	197	4.9	N/A
Conservative	Stephen McMinnies	181	4.5	N/A
Turnout				
Labour hold		Swing		
Labour hold		Swing		
Labour hold		Swing		

=== Highbury East ===
Highbury East
Party	Candidate	Votes	%	±%
Green	Caroline Russell	2,307	52.1	+22.1
Labour	Sue Lukes	1,641	37.0	+1.7
Labour	Osh Gantly	1,628	36.7	−0.7
Green	Benali Hamdache	1,555	35.1	+13.7
Labour	Chris Russell	1,546	34.9	+5.1
Green	Ernestas Jegorovas	1,533	34.6	+16.8
Liberal Democrats	Terry Stacy	887	20.0	−9.3
Liberal Democrats	Kate Pothalingam	775	17.5	−12.2
Liberal Democrats	Nathan Hill	575	13.0	−15.1
Conservative	Connor Coleman	239	5.4	−4.7
Conservative	Riddhi Bhalla	204	4.6	−4.7
Conservative	Jianjun Xi	142	3.2	N/A
Turnout				
Green hold		Swing		
Labour hold		Swing		
Labour hold		Swing		

=== Highbury West ===
Highbury West
Party	Candidate	Votes	%	±%
Labour	Theresa Debono	3,002	62.5	+6.1
Labour	Andy Hull	2,784	58.0	+8.8
Labour	Roulin Khondoker	2,642	55.0	+1.3
Green	Nicola Baird	1,038	21.6	−0.4
Green	Rosalind Sharpe	694	14.4	−8.2
Liberal Democrats	Gabrielle Mann	612	12.7	+5.4
Green	Andrew Myer	584	12.2	−9.1
Liberal Democrats	Philip Middleton	561	11.7	+4.2
Women's Equality	Alison Marshall	444	9.2	N/A
Liberal Democrats	Robert Page	436	9.1	−0.1
Conservative	Tom Day	426	8.9	−9.4
Conservative	Ed McGuinness	390	8.1	−5.7
Conservative	Rob Deering	386	8.0	−3.6
Turnout				
Labour hold		Swing		
Labour hold		Swing		
Labour hold		Swing		

=== Hillrise ===
Hillrise
Party	Candidate	Votes	%	±%
Labour	Marian Spall	2,446	63.6	+7.9
Labour	Michelline Ngongo	2,443	63.6	+11.6
Labour	Dave Poyser	2,369	61.6	+9.7
Women's Equality	Nikki Uppal	818	21.3	N/A
Green	Anna Portch	486	12.6	−7.0
Green	Bernadette Wren	461	12.0	−7.2
Liberal Democrats	Lorraine Constantinou	423	11.0	−14.9
Liberal Democrats	Rosa Verity	403	10.5	−12.6
Green	Stephen Horne	345	9.0	−5.3
Liberal Democrats	Ursula Woolley	337	8.8	−11.7
Conservative	Julian Bridger	251	6.5	N/A
Conservative	Ben Goldring	246	6.4	N/A
Conservative	Zak Vora	196	5.1	N/A
Turnout				
Labour hold		Swing		
Labour hold		Swing		
Labour hold		Swing		

=== Holloway ===
Holloway
Party	Candidate	Votes	%	±%
Labour	Rakhia Ismail	2,764	66.6	+11.8
Labour	Paul Smith	2,695	64.9	+5.2
Labour	Diarmaid Ward	2,665	64.2	+10.5
Green	Claire Poyner	547	13.2	−8.7
Liberal Democrats	Mark Atkinson	495	11.9	−1.7
Liberal Democrats	Alice Meek	483	11.6	−2.0
Green	Robert Magowan	468	11.3	−12.8
Liberal Democrats	David Kelly	431	10.4	−2.2
Conservative	Jonathan Lui	414	10.0	N/A
Green	Jon Nott	379	9.1	−11.1
Conservative	Christina Michalos	368	8.9	N/A
Conservative	Ian Singlehurst	365	8.8	N/A
Turnout				
Labour hold		Swing		
Labour hold		Swing		
Labour hold		Swing		

=== Junction ===
Junction
Party	Candidate	Votes	%	±%
Labour	Janet Burgess	2,391	71.0	+7.3
Labour	Sheila Chapman	2,236	66.4	+15.5
Labour	Kaya Comer-Schwartz	2,192	65.1	+9.7
Green	Olivia Brunning	621	18.4	−2.2
Green	Paul Elliott	389	11.6	−8.9
Liberal Democrats	Stefan Kasprzyk	331	9.8	+0.3
Green	Eric Fabrizi	326	9.7	−8.1
Liberal Democrats	Kath Pollard	289	8.6	+0.1
Conservative	John Wilkin	280	8.3	−2.0
Liberal Democrats	Amy Vatcher	271	8.0	+1.0
Conservative	Toan Hoang	262	7.8	−1.3
Conservative	Chinwe Bunting	256	7.6	−1.4
Socialist (GB)	Bill Martin	52	1.5	−1.1
Turnout				
Labour hold		Swing		
Labour hold		Swing		
Labour hold		Swing		

=== Mildmay ===
Mildmay
Party	Candidate	Votes	%	±%
Labour	Jenny Kay	2,331	67.4	+10.9
Labour	Santiago Bell-Bradford	2,231	64.6	+7.5
Labour	Joe Caluori	2,209	63.9	+10.8
Green	Bob Barnes	547	15.8	−1.3
Green	Sarah Marks	520	15.0	−1.1
Green	Dudley Ross	407	11.8	−4.1
Liberal Democrats	Julie Whittaker	404	11.7	+1.8
Liberal Democrats	Baani Singh	319	9.2	+1.4
Liberal Democrats	Eleni Zodiates	309	8.9	+1.8
Conservative	Amber Sheridan	291	8.4	−1.8
Conservative	Alexandra Eldridge	286	8.3	−1.3
Conservative	Farakhan Coote	275	8.0	+0.6
Turnout				
Labour hold		Swing		
Labour hold		Swing		
Labour hold		Swing		

=== St George's ===
St George's
Party	Candidate	Votes	%	±%
Labour	Kat Fletcher	2,227	55.2	−5.9
Labour	Tricia Clarke	2,161	53.5	+3.2
Labour	Satnam Gill	2,031	50.3	−3.7
Green	Natasha Cox	1,512	37.5	+16.8
Green	Zoe O'Sullivan	1,366	33.8	+15.4
Green	Rod Gonggrijp	1,294	32.1	+14.7
Liberal Democrats	Nadine Mellor	251	6.2	−18.8
Liberal Democrats	David Wilson	248	6.1	−12.8
Conservative	Richard Bunting	216	5.4	N/A
Conservative	Andrew Kidd	191	4.7	N/A
Conservative	Mags Joseph	189	4.7	N/A
Liberal Democrats	Charles Radcliffe	179	4.4	−13.9
Turnout				
Labour hold		Swing		
Labour hold		Swing		
Labour hold		Swing		

=== St Mary's ===
St Mary's
Party	Candidate	Votes	%	±%
Labour	Angela Picknell	1,701	52.0	−0.7
Labour	Nurullah Turan	1,535	47.0	+2.2
Labour	Gary Poole	1,534	46.9	−1.6
Liberal Democrats	Pierre Delarue	904	27.7	+14.4
Liberal Democrats	Ilana Lever	882	27.0	+16.2
Liberal Democrats	Victor Kaufman	824	25.2	+16.3
Conservative	Alexander Baker	418	12.8	−4.4
Green	Alexandra Burton	397	12.1	−10.3
Conservative	James Kanagasooriam	379	11.6	−5.4
Conservative	Nigel Watts	343	10.5	−5.7
Green	Mike Crowson	317	9.7	−5.6
Green	Jonathan Hathaway	270	8.3	−6.7
Turnout				
Labour hold		Swing		
Labour hold		Swing		
Labour hold		Swing		

=== St Peter's ===
St Peter's
Party	Candidate	Votes	%	±%
Labour	Martin Klute	1,816	55.3	−4.8
Labour	Vivien Cutler	1,786	54.4	−4.8
Labour	Alice Clarke-Perry	1,762	53.7	−5.4
Liberal Democrats	Kathryn Davies	579	17.6	+5.9
Conservative	Christian Forsdyke	572	17.4	−3.1
Conservative	Muhammad Kalaam	558	17.0	−3.1
Liberal Democrats	Mark Burch	500	15.2	+4.2
Conservative	Evan Williams	499	15.2	−4.9
Liberal Democrats	David Sant	443	13.5	+4.4
Green	Michael Coffey	406	12.4	−6.7
Green	Wendy Proudfoot	355	10.8	−2.1
Green	Fabrice Ward	315	9.6	−2.3
Turnout				
Labour hold		Swing		
Labour hold		Swing		
Labour hold		Swing		

=== Tollington ===
Tollington
Party	Candidate	Votes	%	±%
Labour	Anjna Khurana	2,764	71.8	+12.6
Labour	Richard Watts	2,727	70.8	+10.3
Labour	Flora Williamson	2,707	70.3	+10.7
Green	Lilli Geissendorfer	674	17.5	−8.4
Green	Robin Latimer	456	11.8	−12.6
Green	Zachary Gomperts-Mitchelson	380	9.9	−9.4
Liberal Democrats	Jane Nicolov	328	8.5	−1.8
Liberal Democrats	Julian Gregory	322	8.4	−1.7
Liberal Democrats	George Allan	278	7.2	−0.8
Conservative	Nicholas Bennett	216	5.6	N/A
Conservative	Chris Williams	212	5.5	N/A
Conservative	Stephen Ward	200	5.2	N/A
Turnout				
Labour hold		Swing		
Labour hold		Swing		
Labour hold		Swing		

== By-elections 2018-2022 ==
St. George’s ward by-election, 12 December 2019
Party	Candidate	Votes	%	±%
Labour	Gulcin Ozdemir	2,918	45	▼8.2
Green	Natasha Cox	2,501	39	▲3.5
Liberal Democrats	Helen Redesdale	738	11	▲6.6
Women's Equality	Guilene Marco	268	4	N/A
Majority				
Turnout				
Labour hold		Swing		

Bunhill ward by-election, 6 May 2021
Party	Candidate	Votes	%	±%
Labour	Valerie Bossman	1,960	48.4	▼6.2
Conservative	Zak Vora	744	18.4	▲3.4
Green	Louise Webb	590	14.6	▲1.5
Liberal Democrats	Maxx Turing	572	14.1	▲1.7
Independent	Thomas Perks	181	4.5	N/A
Majority				
Turnout				
Labour hold		Swing		

Holloway ward by-election, 6 May 2021
Party	Candidate	Votes	%	±%
Labour	Jason Jackson	2,852	58.1	▼7.4
Green	Clare Poyner	792	16.1	▲3.2
Conservative	Harry Nugent	720	14.7	▲4.8
Liberal Democrats	Charles Hyett	548	11.2	▼0.6
Majority				
Turnout				
Labour hold		Swing		

Highbury West ward by-election, 6 May 2021
Party	Candidate	Votes	%	±%
Labour	Yassin Ibrahim	2,465	42.4	▼16.7
Green	Katie Dawson	1,799	30.9	▲10.5
Liberal Democrats	Terry Stacy	776	13.3	▲1.3
Conservative	Ben Jackson	733	13.3	▲4.9
Majority				
Turnout				
Labour hold		Swing		

Mildmay ward by-election, 6 May 2021
Party	Candidate	Votes	%	±%
Labour	Ricardo Weekes	2,307	55.7	▼9.5
Green	Zoe Alzamora	883	21.4	▲6.0
Conservative	Henry Woodroofe	603	14.6	▲6.4
Liberal Democrats	Phil Stevens	349	8.4	▼2.9
Majority				
Turnout				
Labour hold		Swing		

St Peter’s ward by-election, 6 May 2021
Party	Candidate	Votes	%	±%
Labour	Toby North	1,885	42.9	▼10.9
Liberal Democrats	Elizabeth Collins	876	19.9	▼2.8
Conservative	Abdul Kalaam	749	17.0	▼0.1
Green	Veronica Pasteur	567	12.9	▲0.9
Independent	Jody Graber	318	7.2	N/A
Majority				
Turnout				
Labour hold		Swing		

Tolligton ward by-election, 1 July 2021
Party	Candidate	Votes	%	±%
Labour	Mick Gilgunn	1,243	56.7	▼12.8
Green	Jon Ward	730	33.3	▲16.3
Conservative	Vanessa Carson	127	5.8	▲0.4
Liberal Democrats	Jane Nicolov	94	4.3	▼4.0
Majority				
Turnout				
Labour hold		Swing		
