= Claudia Webbe =

British politician (born 1965)

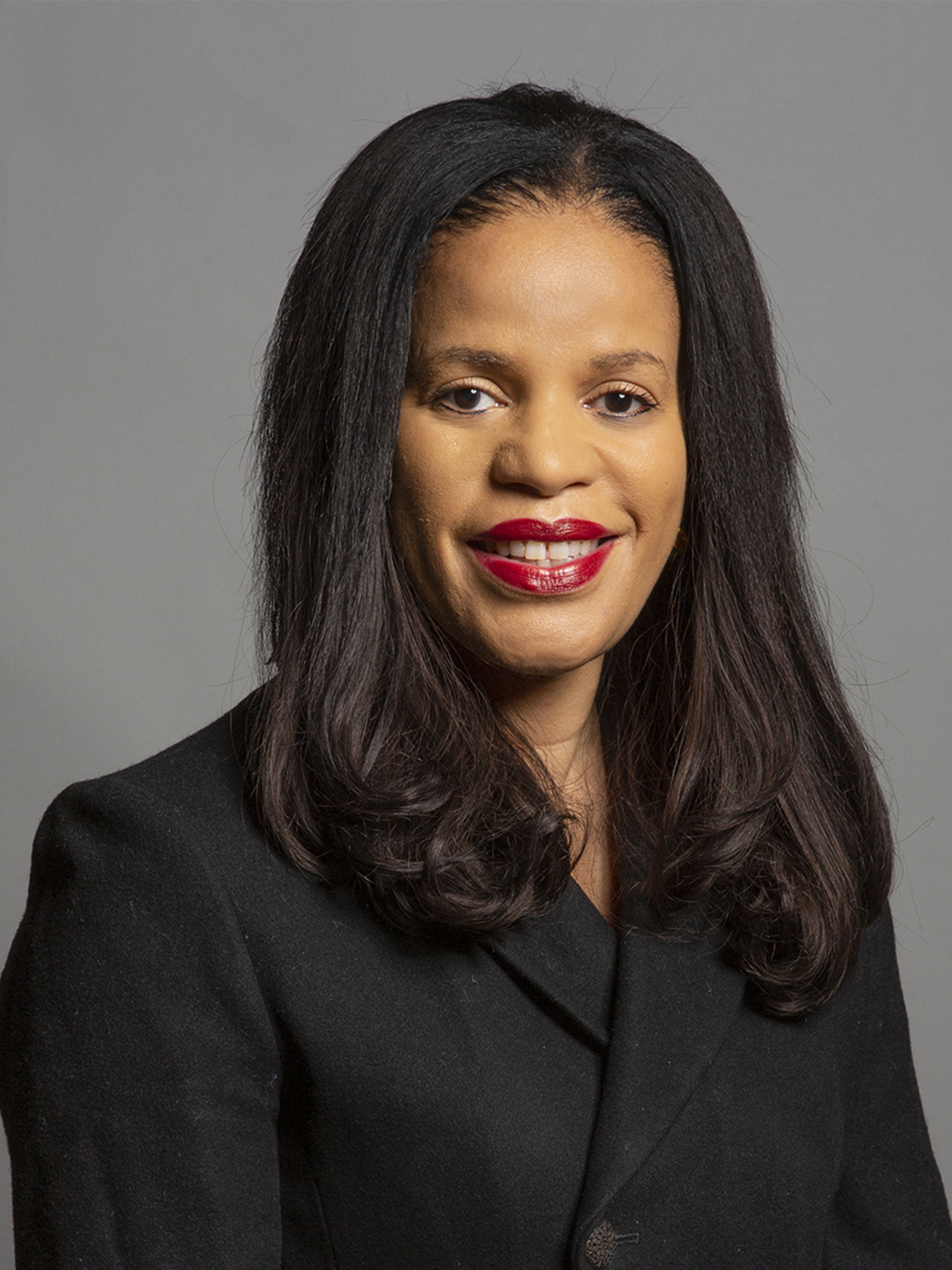
- Official portrait, 2019

Member of Parliament for Leicester East
- In office 12 December 2019 – 30 May 2024
- Preceded by: Keith Vaz
- Succeeded by: Shivani Raja

Member of Islington London Borough Council for Bunhill
- In office 6 May 2010 – 6 May 2021
- Preceded by: Donna Boffa

Personal details
- Born: Claudia Naomi Webbe; 8 March 1965 (age 61) Leicester, England
- Party: Your Party (2025–present)
- Other political affiliations: Labour (until 3 November 2021); Independent (2021–2025)
- Education: Lanchester Polytechnic (BSc); De Montfort University (BA); University of Birmingham; Birkbeck, University of London (MSc); University of Nottingham (PgDip)
- Website: Official website

Claudia Naomi Webbe (born 8 March 1965) is a British politician who served as the Member of Parliament (MP) for Leicester East from 2019 to 2024. Elected to Parliament as a Labour MP in 2019, she sat as an independent from 2021 until she lost her seat at the 2024 general election.

Born in Leicester, Webbe was a councillor in the London Borough of Islington from 2010 until her resignation in March 2021, having served as its cabinet member for environment and transport. She was a member of the National Executive Committee of the Labour Party from 2016 until her election to Parliament. Webbe was the first female MP for Leicester East.

She was suspended from the party whip in September 2020 after being charged with harassment of a woman who was having an affair with Webbe's then partner. Webbe was later expelled from the Labour Party on 3 November 2021 after being convicted in October 2021. Her appeal was partially dismissed on 26 May 2022, though her sentence was reduced to eighty hours of community service, and compensation to the victim reduced from £1,000 to £50. As Webbe's reduced sentence was not custodial, it did not trigger a constituency recall petition under the Recall of MPs Act 2015.

== Early life and career ==
Claudia Webbe was born on 8 March 1965 in Leicester. She has described how she was born and brought up in Leicester to parents of African descent who migrated from Nevis to the UK around the time of the Windrush generation.

She attended King Richard III Secondary school, now Fullhurst Community College, in south-west Leicester and Gateway Sixth Form College. She attended Lanchester Polytechnic from 1983 to 1986, gaining a BSc degree in mathematics, statistics and computers.

She studied Social Science at Leicester Polytechnic, a professional qualification in community and youth work at the University of Birmingham and a postgraduate diploma in socio-legal studies at the University of Nottingham, specialising in children, followed by race and ethnic relations at Birkbeck, University of London.

Webbe is a founder and former chair of Operation Trident, a community-led initiative created in the mid-1990s to tackle the disproportionate effects of gun violence on black communities. In 2010, it was reported that Operation Trident would be disbanded as part of spending cuts.

In February 2013, Trident was reformed as the Trident Gang Crime Command to focus on youth violence, with the police chairing the Trident Independent Advisory Group itself. Webbe opposed the change, and called it "a backwards step on race".

== Early political career ==
Webbe was a policy director and adviser to the Mayor of London, Ken Livingstone.

Webbe stood for election as a councillor in the Hillrise ward of Islington in 2006, but was unsuccessful. She was elected as a Labour councillor to Islington London Borough Council in 2010, representing Bunhill ward. She was re-elected in 2014 and 2018. She served as the council's executive member for the environment and transport. Webbe resigned as an Islington councillor in March 2021, following her election to Parliament.

Considered to be a close ally of the then Labour Party leader, Jeremy Corbyn, Webbe was elected to the party's National Executive Committee (NEC) with support from the Momentum organisation in 2016, finishing third in the ballot with 92,377 votes. In 2018, she was shortlisted to become the Labour candidate in the Lewisham East by-election, but finished third in a vote among local party members, and was not selected. In July 2018, she was elected as chair of the NEC Disputes Panel. In 2018, Webbe was re-elected to the NEC, finishing second in the ballot with 83,797 votes. She became ineligible to retain her NEC membership upon being elected to Parliament.

== Parliamentary career ==
She was selected as the Labour candidate for Leicester East for the 2019 general election; the party's incumbent MP, Keith Vaz, had stood down after being suspended from Parliament for six months. Her selection resulted in the resignation of the Constituency Labour Party chair, who described it as "a fix", and some in the local British Indian community were angry that one of their candidates was not interviewed. Some saw it as a Momentum-led imposition of a left-wing candidate on a traditionally centrist constituency party. Webbe was elected as MP for Leicester East with 50.8% of the vote and a majority of 6,019.

Webbe sat on the Backbench Business Committee in the House of Commons between March 2020 and April 2021. She later sat on the Environmental Audit Committee, the Foreign Affairs Committee, and the Committee of Arms Export Control. She was also an "alternate member" of the United Kingdom's delegation to the Organization for Security and Co-operation in Europe. She was a member of the Socialist Campaign Group of Labour MPs.

In February 2021, Webbe apologised after an investigation by the Parliamentary Commissioner for Standards found that she had broken the Code of Conduct for MPs by her late registrations of remunerations received for her role as a councillor in Islington. The Commissioner also noted the late registration of a payment received from a business. In April that year, Webbe stated on Twitter that "Earth is overpopulated; there are too many rich people. To solve the climate crisis; the rich must be abolished", a remark that drew criticism in view of her £81,000-per-year MP's salary.

In March 2023, a man who had bombarded Webbe with racist and misogynistic abuse was convicted of sending electronic communication intended to cause distress or anxiety and three counts of racially aggravated harassment. He was sentenced to 28 months' imprisonment.

In December 2023, Webbe expressed her support for South Africa's ICJ genocide case against Israel. Webbe also alleged genocide in a December 2023 ICC complaint, becoming the first United Kingdom parliamentarian on record to do so. Additionally, she called upon the UK government, the prime minister, and the leader of the Labour party to reassess their stance on the matter, urging for a ceasefire.

Webbe, in May 2024, announced that she would be running as an independent candidate in Leicester East at the 2024 general election. The Workers Party of Britain said it would not stand a candidate against Webbe and would support her if she chose to stand again. Webbe failed in her re-election bid, receiving just 11.8% of the total vote share and finishing fourth. In a shock outcome, despite national polling predicting a major nationwide shift away from the governing Conservative Party, its candidate, Shivani Raja, gained the seat; Webbe would emerge the only member of the 2019 parliamentary cohort to be unseated by a Conservative. In 2025, Webbe announced she had joined the newly formed Your Party.

== Harassment conviction ==
On 28 September 2020, Webbe was charged with harassment of a woman between 1 September 2018 and 26 April 2020. She was placed on unconditional bail to appear at Westminster Magistrates' Court. She was suspended from the Labour whip pending the outcome of the case. On 11 November 2020, Webbe pleaded not guilty. The harassment was directed at a woman who was having an affair with her partner, and allegedly based on hearsay included a threat to send 'naked' photographs of the victim to her children. The threats also allegedly included Webbe saying "You should be acid" [sic]. This was later found to be untrue and part of a false statement wrongly maintained by the Crown Prosecution Service

Webbe was found guilty on 13 October 2021. District Judge Paul Goldspring, the Chief Magistrate, said her evidence was "untruthful", and that her defence was "vague, incoherent and at times illogical". A further hearing took place on 4 November 2021, when she was sentenced to 10 weeks imprisonment, suspended for two years, and 200 hours of unpaid work. The Labour Party had called on her to resign from Parliament at the time of her conviction, and she was expelled from the party on the day she was sentenced.

Webbe appealed against the conviction, and the appeal hearing commenced at Southwark Crown Court on 19 May 2022. Her appeal was partially dismissed on 26 May 2022, though her sentence was reduced to eighty hours of community service, and compensation to the victim reduced from £1,000 to £50. The judge found that Webbe had not "made a threat to throw acid over" Michelle Merritt. The judge stated Merritt was an "unsatisfactory witness" who had "told lies". As Webbe's reduced sentence was not custodial, it did not trigger a constituency recall petition under the Recall of MPs Act 2015.

The CPS was later ordered to apologise to Webbe and ordered to pay a nominal goodwill compensation, following an investigation by the Independent Assessor of Complaint, stating that it is "clear" that Webbe suffered an injustice as a result of a "service failure" by the Crown Prosecution Service (CPS), the CPS statement "was both incorrect and reputationally damaging".

== Post-parliamentary career ==
Following her defeat at the 2024 general election, Webbe was appointed as a Patron of the Stop The War Coalition. She also writes a regular column for the Morning Star newspaper.

Parliament of the United Kingdom
Preceded by Keith Vaz	Member of Parliament for Leicester East; 2019–2024	Succeeded by Shivani Raja
