= Fullhurst Community College =

Location
- Imperial Avenue; Leicester, Leicestershire, LE3 1AH; England; 52°37′23″N 1°09′38″W

Information
- Type: Foundation school
- Local authority: Leicester
- Department for Education URN: 120298 Tables
- Ofsted: Reports
- Chair of Governors: Lynne Folwell
- Executive Headteacher: Christina Bailey
- Gender: Coeducational
- Age: 11 to 16
- Enrolment: 1358
- Website: www.fullhurst.leicester.sch.uk

Fullhurst Community College is an over-subscribed 11-16 comprehensive school in Braunstone, West Leicester. In September 2023, Ofsted graded the school 'Good', which reflects the continued improvements the school has made amid record summer examination results. The current Executive Headteacher is Christina Bailey.

Fullhurst Community College opened in 1991 following the closure of King Richard III School and Newarke School. It was initially located on the King Richard site while a significant refurbishment of the Newarke site took place. It moved into the Newarke buildings in 1992. After this, the college received funding from the Building Schools For The Future program. Under this, DRCC retained its 1930s red bricks and clocktower and was combined with a new, glass building 2 with 1st-century facilities to allow students to thrive. Recently, DRCC has inhabited Ellesmere College's old building and turned it into a £15 million new campus to house Year 7 and Year 8 students, also allowing the college to expand its student population to 1500 from September 2020.

The school has also won awards such as the Department For Education Pupil Premium Secondary Champion, Leicester Mercury School Of The Year, and finalists for Pearson's 2018 National School Of The Year.

== Notable pupils ==
=== King Richard III Secondary School ===
- Claudia Webbe, former MP for Leicester East, 2019—2024
