= Highbury (Islington ward) =

- Electoral ward for the Islington London Borough Council
- Highbury ward boundaries since 2022
- Borough: Islington
- County: Greater London
- Population: 13,808 (2021) (Note: 2021 Census data reported for 2022 ward boundaries)
- Electorate: 9,974 (2022)
- Area: 1.11 square kilometres (0.43 sq mi)

Current electoral ward
- Created: 1965–2002 (first creation); 2022 (second creation)
- Number of members: 1965–1978: 4; 1978–2002: 3; 2022–present: 3
- Councillors: Benali Hamdache; Talia Hussain; Jon Nott
- Created from: Highbury East, Highbury West and Mildmay in 2022
- GSS code: E05013704 (2022-present)

Highbury is an electoral ward in the London Borough of Islington. The ward was originally created in 1965 and abolished in 2002. It was created again for the 2022 elections. It returns councillors to Islington London Borough Council.

== Islington council elections since 2022 ==
There was a revision of ward boundaries in Islington in 2002. The ward of Highbury was recreated.

=== 2026 election ===
Highbury (3)
Party	Candidate	Votes	%	±%
Green	Benali Hamdache*	2,090		
Green	Talia Hussain	2,016		
Green	Jon Robert Nott	1,857		
Labour	Alastair Harper	1,481		
Labour	Michael Comba	1,468		
Labour	Tahreen Dewan	1,422		
Liberal Democrats	Julia Williams	417		
Conservative	Eileen Gallagher	377		
Liberal Democrats	Rowan James	370		
Reform	Joseph Wisepart	354		
Conservative	Philip Kelvin	338		
Liberal Democrats	Paul Symes	319		
Independent	Andrew Somerset	309		
Conservative	Carlien Sai	260		
Green hold		Swing		
Green hold		Swing		
Green hold		Swing		

=== 2022 election ===
The election took place on 5 May 2022.

2022 Islington London Borough Council election: Highbury (3)
Party	Candidate	Votes	%	±%
Green	Caroline Russell	2,282	52.5	
Green	Benali Hamdache	1,934	44.5	
Green	Ernestas Jegorovas-Armstrong	1,803	41.5	
Labour	Sue Lukes	1,574	36.2	
Labour	Minda Burgos-Lukes	1,507	34.7	
Labour	Talal Karim	1,367	31.5	
Liberal Democrats	Ketish Pothalingam	521	12.0	
Liberal Democrats	Philip Stevens	498	11.5	
Liberal Democrats	Paul Symes	408	9.4	
Conservative	Mark Eldridge	384	8.8	
Conservative	Robert Deering	381	8.8	
Conservative	Laura Knightley	379	8.7	
Turnout			44.7	
Green win (new seat)				
Green win (new seat)				
Green win (new seat)				
