= 2010 Islington London Borough Council election =

2010 Islington Council election
- 6 May 2010

All 48 council seats
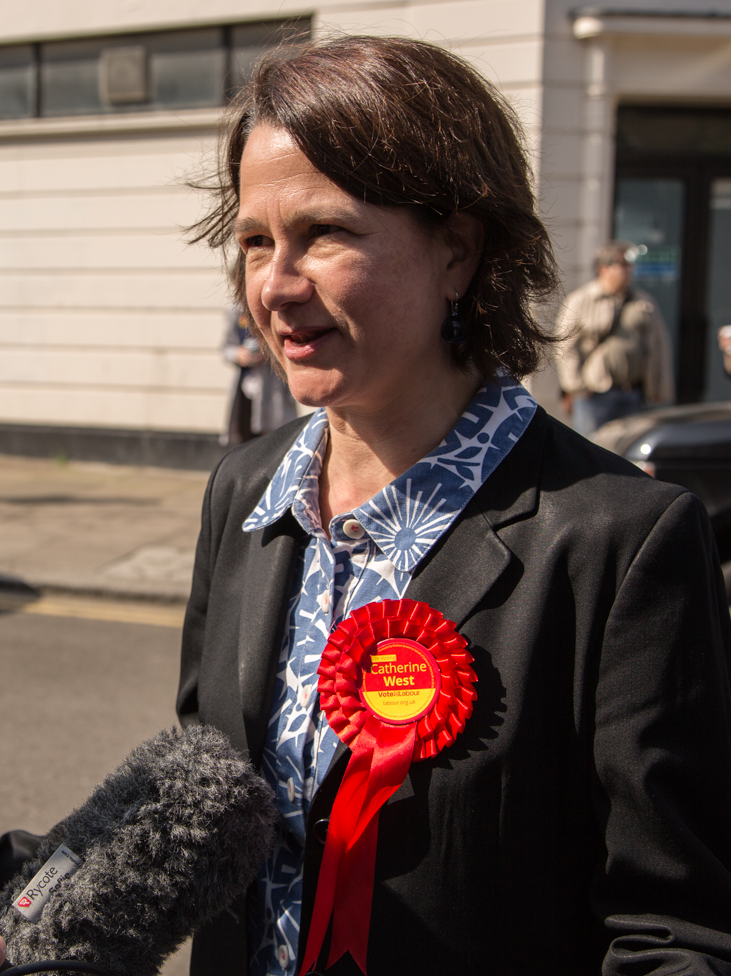

	First party	Second party
Leader	Catherine West	Terry Stacy
Party	Labour	Liberal Democrats
Leader since	2004	14 May 2009
Leader's seat	Tollington	Highbury East
Last election	23 seats, 34.9%	24 seats, 33.1%
Seats won	35	13
Seat change	▲12	▼11
Popular vote	103,282	82,794
Percentage	39.5%	31.6%
Swing	▲4.6%	▼1.5%
Leader of Largest Party before election
Terry Stacy
Liberal Democrats
Subsequent Leader of Largest Party
Catherine West
Labour

Map of the results of the 2010 Islington council election. Labour in red and Liberal Democrats in yellow.

The 2010 Islington Council election took place on 6 May 2010 to elect members of Islington London Borough Council in London, England. The whole council was up for election and the Labour Party gained overall control of the council from no overall control.

== Election result ==
Islington Council Election Result 2010
Party	Seats	Gains	Losses	Net gain/loss	Seats %	Votes %	Votes	+/−
Labour	35	12	0	+12	72.9	39.5	103,282	+4.6
Liberal Democrats	13	0	11	−11	27.1	31.6	82,794	−1.5
Green	0	0	1	−1	0.0	12.7	33,117	−3.9
Conservative	0	0	0	0	0.0	15.7	41,201	+4.8
Independent	0	0	0	0	0.0	0.3	791	−0.3
BNP	0	0	0	0	0.0	0.1	257	+0.1
UKIP	0	0	0	0	0.0	0.1	199	+0.1

== Ward results ==
Barnsbury (3)
Party	Candidate	Votes	%	±%
Labour	James Murray	2,399	43.4	
Labour	Jilani Chowdhury	2,165	39.1	
Labour	Mouna Hamitouche	2,064	37.3	
Liberal Democrats	Oliver Strong	1,460	26.4	
Liberal Democrats	Mark Davies	1,358	24.5	
Liberal Democrats	Shamima Begum	1,221	22.1	
Conservative	Flora Coleman	1,204	21.8	
Conservative	David Tucker	1,198	21.7	
Conservative	Duncan Webster	1,111	20.1	
Green	Sheena Etches	557	10.1	
Green	Claire Shepherd	528	9.5	
Green	Harry Hicks	490	8.9	
Independent	Ed Fredenburgh	87	1.6	
Turnout		5,532	64.3	+28.4
Labour hold		Swing		
Labour hold		Swing		
Labour hold		Swing		

Bunhill (3)
Party	Candidate	Votes	%	±%
Labour	Claudia Webbe	2,177	40.0	
Labour	Troy Gallagher	2,056	37.7	
Labour	Robert Khan	1,812	33.3	
Liberal Democrats	Adrian Hall	1,745	32.0	
Liberal Democrats	Peter Muswell	1,702	31.2	
Liberal Democrats	Jyoti Vaja	1,623	29.8	
Conservative	Michael Moulder	1,119	20.5	
Conservative	Michael Bull	1,095	20.1	
Conservative	Sky Ciantar	950	17.4	
Green	Alison Hood	596	10.9	
Green	Rosalind Sharper	399	7.3	
Green	Adam Stacey	272	5.0	
BNP	Walter Barfoot	257	4.7	
Turnout		5,449	55.6	+26.2
Labour gain from Liberal Democrats		Swing		
Labour gain from Liberal Democrats		Swing		
Labour gain from Liberal Democrats		Swing		

Caledonian (3)
Party	Candidate	Votes	%	±%
Labour	Rupert Perry	2,540	44.9	
Labour	Paul Convery	2,502	44.2	
Labour	Charlynne Pullen	2,245	39.7	
Liberal Democrats	Helen Walsh	1,762	31.1	
Liberal Democrats	Abdul Ahad	1,466	25.9	
Liberal Democrats	Mihir Magudia	1,404	24.8	
Conservative	David Cheape	880	15.6	
Conservative	Eve Gannon	867	15.3	
Conservative	Ramona Simms	776	13.7	
Green	Alex Gordon	640	11.3	
Green	Stephen Mooney	605	10.7	
Green	Christine Muirhead	440	7.8	
Turnout		5,658	60.0	+25.8
Labour hold		Swing		
Labour hold		Swing		
Labour hold		Swing		

Canonbury (3)
Party	Candidate	Votes	%	±%
Liberal Democrats	Paula Belford	2,012	34.8	
Labour	Wally Burgess	1,921	33.2	
Labour	Faye Whaley	1,905	32.9	
Liberal Democrats	Barbara Smith	1,816	31.4	
Labour	Tim McLoughlin	1,797	31.1	
Liberal Democrats	Farhana Hoque	1,632	28.2	
Conservative	John Devlin	1,093	18.9	
Conservative	Oriel Hutchinson	1,066	18.4	
Conservative	Anne Crossfield	1,059	18.3	
Green	Peter Bloor	608	10.5	
Green	Richard Halvorson	503	8.7	
Green	Jules Le Bihan	500	8.6	
UKIP	Rose-Marie McDonald	199	3.4	
Independent	Terry Comer	129	2.2	
Turnout		5,782	64.6	+32.9
Liberal Democrats hold		Swing		
Labour gain from Liberal Democrats		Swing		
Labour gain from Liberal Democrats		Swing		

Clerkenwell (3)
Party	Candidate	Votes	%	±%
Labour	Raphael Andrews	1,691	33.7	
Labour	Steph Charalambous	1,669	33.2	
Liberal Democrats	George Allan	1,622	32.3	
Labour	James Court	1,539	30.7	
Liberal Democrats	Dominic Curran	1,420	28.3	
Liberal Democrats	Marisha Ray	1,402	27.9	
Conservative	Simon Bone	1,053	21.0	
Conservative	Pauline Tucker	1,053	21.0	
Conservative	David Vaiani	905	18.0	
Green	Michael Coffey	552	11.0	
Green	William Barber	518	10.3	
Green	Stephen Oliver	484	9.6	
Independent	Helen Cagnoni	383	7.6	
Turnout		5,020	58.0	+26.7
Labour gain from Liberal Democrats		Swing		
Labour gain from Liberal Democrats		Swing		
Liberal Democrats hold		Swing		

Finsbury Park (3)
Party	Candidate	Votes	%	±%
Labour	Phil Kelly	2,908	52.7	
Labour	Barbara Sidnell	2,660	48.2	
Labour	Mick O'Sullivan	2,620	47.5	
Liberal Democrats	Euan Cameron	1,271	23.0	
Liberal Democrats	Heather Johnson	1,046	19.0	
Liberal Democrats	Rebecca Taylor	1,037	18.8	
Green	Nicola Baird	838	15.2	
Green	Rosemary House	712	12.9	
Conservative	Frank Hopkins	687	12.5	
Green	Robin Latimer	683	12.4	
Conservative	Anne Hudd	626	11.3	
Conservative	Nigel Watts	576	10.4	
Turnout		5,516	57.0	+26.4
Labour hold		Swing		
Labour hold		Swing		
Labour hold		Swing		

Highbury East (3)
Party	Candidate	Votes	%	±%
Liberal Democrats	Julie Horten	2,506	42.8	
Liberal Democrats	John Gilbert	2,484	42.4	
Liberal Democrats	Terry Stacy	2,160	36.9	
Labour	Matt Creamer	1,772	30.2	
Labour	Clare Jeapes	1,747	29.8	
Labour	Regine Kaseki	1,391	23.7	
Green	Emma Dixon	1,117	19.1	
Conservative	Stephen Brindle	837	14.3	
Conservative	James Barker	809	13.8	
Conservative	Neil Lindsay	733	12.5	
Green	Andrew Myer	657	11.2	
Green	James Humphreys	639	10.9	
Turnout		5,861	67.6	+31.1
Liberal Democrats hold		Swing		
Liberal Democrats hold		Swing		
Liberal Democrats hold		Swing		

Highbury West (3)
Party	Candidate	Votes	%	±%
Labour	Theresa Debono	3,030	44.3	
Labour	Richard Greening	2,882	42.2	
Labour	Andy Hull	2,508	36.7	
Green	Katie Dawson	2,020	29.5	
Liberal Democrats	Edward Cooke	1,639	24.0	
Green	Caroline Russell	1,500	21.9	
Liberal Democrats	Philip Middleton	1,290	18.9	
Green	Jon Nott	1,254	18.3	
Conservative	Thomas Duke	1,043	15.3	
Conservative	Edward Waldegrave	909	13.3	
Conservative	Jana Hrnciarove	902	13.2	
Liberal Democrats	Selim Yilmaz	900	13.2	
Turnout		6,837	63.9	+29.1
Labour hold		Swing		
Labour gain from Green		Swing		
Labour hold		Swing		

Hillrise (3)
Party	Candidate	Votes	%	±%
Labour	Marian Spall	2,147	40.4	
Liberal Democrats	Lorraine Constantinou	2,073	39.0	
Liberal Democrats	Greg Foxsmith	2,066	38.9	
Labour	Stephen Ng	2,017	38.0	
Labour	Tom Ogg	1,966	37.0	
Liberal Democrats	Julia Williams	1,846	34.8	
Green	Mary Adshead	606	11.4	
Green	Mick Holloway	579	10.9	
Green	Daniel Hudson	526	9.9	
Conservative	Chinwe Bunting	501	9.4	
Conservative	Joseph Eldridge	494	9.3	
Conservative	Jackie Fage	458	8.6	
Turnout		5,312	63.3	+29.2
Labour gain from Liberal Democrats		Swing		
Liberal Democrats hold		Swing		
Liberal Democrats hold		Swing		

Holloway (3)
Party	Candidate	Votes	%	±%
Labour	Barry Edwards	2,809	45.5	
Labour	Paul Smith	2,721	44.1	
Labour	Lucy Rigby	2,702	43.8	
Liberal Democrats	David Kelly	1,940	31.4	
Liberal Democrats	Andrea O'Halloran	1,715	27.8	
Liberal Democrats	Alan Muhammed	1,522	24.7	
Conservative	Elizabeth Eldridge	896	14.5	
Conservative	James Rooke	816	13.2	
Green	Claire Poyner	805	13.0	
Conservative	Paul Seligman	792	12.8	
Green	James O'Nions	646	10.5	
Green	Mark Chilver	636	10.3	
Turnout		6,169	59.8	+27.6
Labour hold		Swing		
Labour hold		Swing		
Labour hold		Swing		

Junction (3)
Party	Candidate	Votes	%	±%
Labour	Janet Burgess	2,338	42.6	
Liberal Democrats	Arthur Graves	2,182	39.8	
Liberal Democrats	Ursula Woolley	2,125	38.7	
Liberal Democrats	Stefan Kasprzyk	2,071	37.7	
Labour	Olly Parker	1,899	34.6	
Labour	Kaya Makarau-Schwartz	1,878	34.2	
Green	Sue Bineham	713	13.0	
Green	Becky Wright	597	10.9	
Conservative	Connor Coleman	556	10.1	
Conservative	Richard Campbell	533	9.7	
Green	Ken Burgess	529	9.6	
Conservative	James Kerby	480	8.7	
Turnout		5,489	63.9	+28.5
Labour hold		Swing		
Liberal Democrats hold		Swing		
Liberal Democrats hold		Swing		

Mildmay (3)
Party	Candidate	Votes	%	±%
Labour	Kate Groucutt	2,270	40.4	
Liberal Democrats	Rhodri Jamieson-Ball	2,167	38.6	
Labour	Joe Caluori	2,032	36.2	
Liberal Democrats	Philip Stevens	1,945	34.6	
Labour	Conor McGinn	1,939	34.5	
Liberal Democrats	Turhan Ozen	1,808	32.2	
Green	Francesca Hughes	809	14.4	
Conservative	Adam Berry	771	13.7	
Conservative	Andreas Heiner	661	11.8	
Conservative	James Thompson	649	11.6	
Green	Malcolm Powell	532	9.5	
Green	Dudley Ross	501	8.9	
Turnout		5,614	60.9	
Labour gain from Liberal Democrats		Swing		
Liberal Democrats hold		Swing		
Labour gain from Liberal Democrats		Swing		

St George's (3)
Party	Candidate	Votes	%	±%
Liberal Democrats	Tracy Ismail	2,571	44.8	
Liberal Democrats	David Wilson	2,473	43.1	
Labour	Jessica Asato	1,939	33.8	
Liberal Democrats	Caspar Woolley	1,872	32.6	
Labour	Gary Heather	1,817	31.7	
Labour	Alex Smith	1,802	31.4	
Green	Susan Roebuck	836	14.6	
Green	Deborah Maby	814	14.2	
Green	Richard Tate	664	11.6	
Conservative	Julian Nicholson	571	10.0	
Conservative	Chris Olson	552	9.6	
Conservative	Caroline Schwartz	480	8.4	
Turnout		5,738	64.0	+27.9
Liberal Democrats hold		Swing		
Liberal Democrats hold		Swing		
Labour hold		Swing		

St Mary's (3)
Party	Candidate	Votes	%	±%
Labour	Joan Coupland	1,984	34.6	
Liberal Democrats	Susan Buchanan	1,927	33.6	
Labour	Rhiannon Davis	1,869	32.6	
Liberal Democrats	Emily Fieran-Reed	1,839	32.1	
Labour	Gary Poole	1,774	30.9	
Liberal Democrats	Daniel Nicholls	1,667	29.1	
Conservative	Richard Bunting	1,210	21.1	
Conservative	Victoria Lim	1,170	20.4	
Conservative	Simon Toms	988	17.2	
Green	Caroline Allen	716	12.5	
Green	Susie Graves	612	10.7	
Green	Jonathan Hathaway	445	7.8	
Independent	Brian Potter	192	3.3	
Turnout		5,734	64.1	
Labour hold		Swing		
Liberal Democrats hold		Swing		
Labour gain from Liberal Democrats		Swing		

St Peter's (3)
Party	Candidate	Votes	%	±%
Labour	Shelley Coupland	2,117	36.9	
Labour	Gary Doolan	2,088	36.4	
Labour	Martin Klute	2,085	36.3	
Liberal Democrats	Barbara Coventry	1,781	31.0	
Conservative	Nicolas Clark	1,589	27.7	
Liberal Democrats	David Sant	1,530	26.7	
Conservative	Frances Wright	1,308	22.8	
Conservative	Yvette Pathare	1,254	21.8	
Liberal Democrats	Vamsi Velagapudi	1,201	20.9	
Green	Darryl Croft	564	9.8	
Green	Christian Spurrier	468	8.2	
Green	Richard Wood	281	4.9	
Turnout		5,740	64.0	+30.9
Labour hold		Swing		
Labour hold		Swing		
Labour hold		Swing		

Tollington (3)
Party	Candidate	Votes	%	±%
Labour	Catherine West	2,476	42.6	
Labour	Richard Watts	2,350	40.4	
Labour	Jean-Roger Kaseki	2,263	38.9	
Liberal Democrats	Alexander Ollier	1,604	27.6	
Liberal Democrats	Juliet Makhapila	1,466	25.2	
Liberal Democrats	Robert Smith	1,425	24.5	
Green	Ann Boater	1,199	20.6	
Green	Carina Dunkerley	1,044	18.0	
Green	Stephen Horne	883	15.2	
Conservative	Alex Gregg	732	12.6	
Conservative	Robert Millen	642	11.0	
Conservative	Christopher Williams	547	9.4	
Turnout		5,811	60.5	+26.5
Labour hold		Swing		
Labour hold		Swing		
Labour hold		Swing		
