= 2002 Islington London Borough Council election =

2002 Islington Council election
- 2 May 2002

All 48 council seats
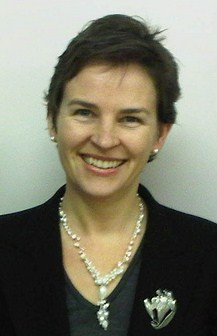
	First party	Second party	Third party
Leader	Steve Hitchins	Mary Creagh
Party	Liberal Democrats	Labour	Green
Leader since	1997	2000
Leader's seat	St. Peter's	Highbury West
Last election	26 seats, 41.4%	26 seats, 40.6%	0 seats, 6.3%
Seats won	38	10	0
Seat change	▲12	▼16	Steady
Popular vote	45,754	35,651	10,775
Percentage	45.8%	35.7%	10.8%
Swing	▲4.4%	▼4.9%	▲4.5%
Leader of Largest Party before election
Steve Hitchins
Liberal Democrats
Subsequent Leader of Largest Party
Steve Hitchins
Liberal Democrats

Map of the results of the 2002 Islington council election. Liberal Democrats in yellow and Labour in red.

The 2002 Islington Council election took place on 2 May 2002 to elect members of Islington London Borough Council in London, England. The whole council was up for election with boundary changes since the last election in 1998 reducing the number of seats by 4. The Liberal Democrats stayed in overall control of the council.

== Background ==
The 1998 election saw the Liberal Democrat and Labour parties finish on 26 seats each, with Labour continuing to run the council with the mayor's casting vote. However, in December 1999 the Liberal Democrats won a majority on the council after gaining a seat from Labour in a by-election. This meant that going into the election the Liberal Democrats had 27 seats, compared to 25 for Labour.

187 candidates stood in the election for the 48 seats being contested, after boundary changes reduced the number of seats by 4. The election was seen as a fight between the Liberal Democrat and Labour parties, with the Green Party aiming to win 1 or 2 seats. The Conservative Party did not put candidates for every seat being contested, while the Christian Peoples Alliance, Independent Working Class Association, Socialist Alliance and Socialist Labour Party all stood candidates, as well as several independents.

Issues in the election were reported as being crime, council housing repairs, asset sell-offs and the proposed new Arsenal stadium.

== Election result ==
The results saw the Liberal Democrats retain control of the council with an increased majority after gaining seats from Labour.

Islington local election result 2002
Party	Seats	Gains	Losses	Net gain/loss	Seats %	Votes %	Votes	+/−
Liberal Democrats	38			+11	79.2	45.8	45,754	+4.4
Labour	10			−15	20.8	35.7	35,651	−4.9
Green	0			0	0.0	10.8	10,775	+4.5
Conservative	0			0	0.0	4.2	4,150	−2.1
Independent	0			0	0.0	1.6	1,580	
Ind. Working Class	0			0	0.0	1.0	1,010	
Socialist Alliance	0			0	0.0	0.6	569	
CPA	0			0	0.0	0.2	242	
Socialist Labour	0			0	0.0	0.2	166	

== Ward results ==
* - Existing Councillor seeking re-election.

Barnsbury (3)
Party	Candidate	Votes	%	±%
Liberal Democrats	Bridget Fox *	1,127		
Liberal Democrats	Sylvia Wright	1,046		
Liberal Democrats	Ian Powney	1,036		
Labour	Jan Pitt	600		
Labour	Emily Thornberry	600		
Labour	Maureen Leigh	561		
Green	Ben Mulvey	238		
Green	Sarah Green	227		
Independent	Anthony Sellen	199		
Conservative	Jacqueline Fage	183		
Conservative	Michael Coney	174		
Conservative	Adam Bogdanor	153		
Turnout		6,144	28.0	
Liberal Democrats hold		Swing		
Liberal Democrats hold		Swing		
Liberal Democrats hold		Swing		

Bunhill (3)
Party	Candidate	Votes	%	±%
Liberal Democrats	Joseph Trotter *	942		
Liberal Democrats	Jyoti Vaja *	909		
Liberal Democrats	Rosetta Wooding *	908		
Labour	Jeremy Breaks	430		
Labour	Daniel Neidle	377		
Labour	William Croucher	355		
Independent	David Warby	185		
Green	Angela Thomson	154		
Conservative	John Brimacombe	118		
Conservative	Joseph Goldsmith	111		
Conservative	Nigel Watts	102		
Turnout		4,591	20.7	
Liberal Democrats hold		Swing		
Liberal Democrats hold		Swing		
Liberal Democrats hold		Swing		

Caledonian (3)
Party	Candidate	Votes	%	±%
Liberal Democrats	Carol Powell	1,074		
Liberal Democrats	Arnold Gibbons	1,018		
Liberal Democrats	Marie Valery	948		
Labour	Ian Perry	897		
Labour	Julia Mackenzie	876		
Labour	Trevor Carter	822		
Green	Sheena Etches	160		
Green	Mark Chilver	155		
Conservative	Christopher Cox	127		
Conservative	Andrew Hicks	101		
Conservative	Martine Oborne	96		
Socialist Labour	Michael Paschale	85		
Turnout		6,359	27.3	

Canonbury (3)
Party	Candidate	Votes	%	±%
Liberal Democrats	Barbara Smith *	1,200		
Liberal Democrats	Jonathan Dearth	1,142		
Liberal Democrats	Lucy Watt	1,088		
Labour	Michael Sharman	514		
Labour	Steven Powell	497		
Labour	Jonah Grunsell	481		
Independent	Ann-Marie Greensmith	218		
Green	Susan Wilkinson	199		
Green	Jeffrey Pike	195		
Conservative	James Candlin	128		
Conservative	Timothy Carrington	128		
Conservative	Andrew Conder	121		
CPA	Esame Diyan	40		
Turnout		5,951	26.8	

Clerkenwell (3)
Party	Candidate	Votes	%	±%
Liberal Democrats	George Allan *	853		
Liberal Democrats	Bruce Neave *	824		
Liberal Democrats	Marisha Ray	769		
Independent	Helen Cagnoni	541		
Ind. Working Class	Gary O'Shea	532		
Ind. Working Class	Lorna Reid	478		
Labour	Paul Jackson	409		
Labour	Harriet Quiney	367		
Labour	Ben Wardle	334		
Green	Kevin Fallon	183		
Green	Rebecca Whale	154		
Conservative	Lee Craven	136		
Conservative	Richard Campbell	129		
Conservative	Peter Warren	104		
Turnout		5,813	25.0	
Liberal Democrats hold		Swing		
Liberal Democrats hold		Swing		
Liberal Democrats hold		Swing		

Finsbury Park (3)
Party	Candidate	Votes	%	±%
Labour	Michael O'Sullivan	911		
Labour	Barbara Sidnell	889		
Labour	Richard Steer	887		
Green	Alice Maby	365		
Green	Nicola Baird	336		
Liberal Democrats	Patricia Peel	324		
Liberal Democrats	Mark Pack	294		
Liberal Democrats	Christopher Porter	274		
Green	Richard Steer	268		
Turnout		4,548	20.0	

Highbury East (3)
Party	Candidate	Votes	%	±%
Liberal Democrats	David Barnes	1,385		
Liberal Democrats	Laura Willoughby	1,378		
Liberal Democrats	Terry Stacy	1,307		
Labour	Theresa Debono	757		
Labour	Timothy Clark	730		
Labour	David Poyser	726		
Green	Christopher Ashby	378		
Green	Sara Meidan	317		
Green	Patricia Tuson	288		
Conservative	Mark Riddleston	152		
Conservative	John Wilkin	147		
Conservative	Tristan Rudgard	144		
Turnout		7,709	33.3	

Highbury West (3)
Party	Candidate	Votes	%	±%
Labour	Mary Creagh *	1,100		
Labour	Richard Greening *	1,038		
Labour	Adrian Pulham	896		
Green	Andrew Myer	748		
Green	Malcolm Powell	644		
Green	Jon Nott	631		
Liberal Democrats	Michael Brand	293		
Liberal Democrats	James King	278		
Liberal Democrats	Dominic Mathon	243		
Conservative	James Barabas	138		
Conservative	Bruce Picking	125		
Conservative	John Shields	112		
Turnout		6,246	25.9	

Hillrise (3)
Party	Candidate	Votes	%	±%
Liberal Democrats	Paul Fox *	1,308		
Liberal Democrats	Heather Johnson	1,205		
Liberal Democrats	Sarah Teather	1,142		
Labour	Alan Clinton *	1,033		
Labour	Beverley Bruce	951		
Labour	John Wyman-White	857		
Green	Michael Holloway	285		
Green	John White	199		
Green	Penelope Kemp	184		
Turnout		7,164	30.4	
Liberal Democrats hold		Swing		
Liberal Democrats gain from Labour		Swing		
Liberal Democrats gain from Labour		Swing		

Holloway (3)
Party	Candidate	Votes	%	±%
Liberal Democrats	Margot Dunn	1,103		
Liberal Democrats	Edward Featherstone *	1,052		
Liberal Democrats	Doreen Scott *	1,023		
Labour	Philip Kelly	632		
Labour	Michael Conneely	630		
Labour	Robert Marchant	585		
Green	Jennifer Chan	189		
Green	Claire Poyner	165		
Socialist Alliance	Elizabeth Clare	139		
CPA	David Curtis	122		
Socialist Alliance	Shirley Franklin	121		
Green	Neil Snaith	120		
Conservative	Kathryn Field	85		
Conservative	Stephen Phillips	83		
Conservative	Mark Seward	64		
Turnout		6,113	26.9	
Liberal Democrats gain from Labour		Swing		
Liberal Democrats gain from Labour		Swing		
Liberal Democrats gain from Labour		Swing		

Junction (3)
Party	Candidate	Votes	%	±%
Liberal Democrats	James Blanchard	1,219		
Liberal Democrats	Stefan Kasprzyk	1,137		
Liberal Democrats	Euan Cameron	1,132		
Labour	Janet Burgess *	1,035		
Labour	Patricia Clarke *	925		
Labour	Talal Karim *	864		
Green	Tania Stokes	261		
Green	Keith Magnum	207		
Green	Beatrice Sayers	204		
CPA	Pearl Grenardo	31		
Turnout		7,015	30.6	
Liberal Democrats gain from Labour		Swing		
Liberal Democrats gain from Labour		Swing		
Liberal Democrats gain from Labour		Swing		

Mildmay (3)
Party	Candidate	Votes	%	±%
Liberal Democrats	Anna Berent	1,120		
Liberal Democrats	Merel Ece	977		
Liberal Democrats	Graham Hay Smith	952		
Labour	Patrick Haynes *	689		
Labour	Glen Isaacs	578		
Labour	Errol Smalley	554		
Green	Christopher Smith	231		
Green	Richard Halvosen	227		
Green	Rosalind Sharpe	216		
Conservative	Andrew Brooke	132		
Conservative	James Brown	112		
Conservative	Nicholas Clements	107		
Socialist Labour	Joti Brar	81		
Turnout		5,976	24.9	
Liberal Democrats gain from Labour		Swing		
Liberal Democrats gain from Labour		Swing		
Liberal Democrats gain from Labour		Swing		

St George's (3)
Party	Candidate	Votes	%	±%
Liberal Democrats	Graham Baker	1,298		
Liberal Democrats	Angela Brook	1,258		
Labour	Walter Burgess	1,111		
Liberal Democrats	Philip Rau	1,091		
Labour	Jenny Rathbone	1,086		
Labour	Jasin Kaplan	995		
Green	James Goggin	309		
Green	Judith Kleinman	288		
Green	Vincent McGowan	239		
CPA	Oluwakemi Onanuga	49		
Turnout		7,724	31.9	

St Mary's (3)
Party	Candidate	Votes	%	±%
Liberal Democrats	Joan Coupland *	1,170		
Liberal Democrats	Richard Heseltine *	1,142		
Liberal Democrats	James Kempton	1,129		
Labour	Georgette Djaba	724		
Labour	Nicholas Milton	697		
Labour	Joseph Simpson	682		
Green	Niamh Burns	249		
Green	Saul Deason	176		
Conservative	Kim Anderson	158		
Conservative	Maui Millwood	128		
Conservative	Krystina Seward	125		
Socialist Alliance	Peter MacDonald	118		
Green	Jan Hallett	80		
Turnout		6,578	28.5	
Liberal Democrats hold		Swing		
Liberal Democrats hold		Swing		
Liberal Democrats hold		Swing		

St Peter's (3)
Party	Candidate	Votes	%	±%
Liberal Democrats	Maria Powell*	1,267		
Liberal Democrats	Stephen Hitchins *	1,266		
Liberal Democrats	Keith Sharp	1,118		
Labour	Elizabeth Bailey	549		
Labour	Martin Klute	456		
Labour	Alexander Whitehead	435		
Green	Douglas Allan	233		
Conservative	Tracey Braddick	155		
Conservative	Sinead Bryan	147		
Green	Swadesh Poorun	145		
Conservative	Matthew Priestley	125		
Turnout		5,896	25.9	
Liberal Democrats hold		Swing		
Liberal Democrats hold		Swing		
Liberal Democrats hold		Swing		

Tollington (3)
Party	Candidate	Votes	%	±%
Labour	Daniel Bonner	1,185		
Labour	Derek Sawyer *	1,176		
Labour	Catherine West	1,168		
Save Arthur Simpson Library	Jonathan Rutherford	437		
Green	Alison Boater	364		
Liberal Democrats	Robert Smith	356		
Liberal Democrats	Alanna Coombes	325		
Green	Denise Bennett	319		
Liberal Democrats	Mark Platt	304		
Green	Robin Latimer	245		
Socialist Alliance	Eric Bailey	191		
Turnout		6,070	25.5	
