= 2006 Islington London Borough Council election =

2006 Islington Council election
- 4 May 2006

All 48 council seats
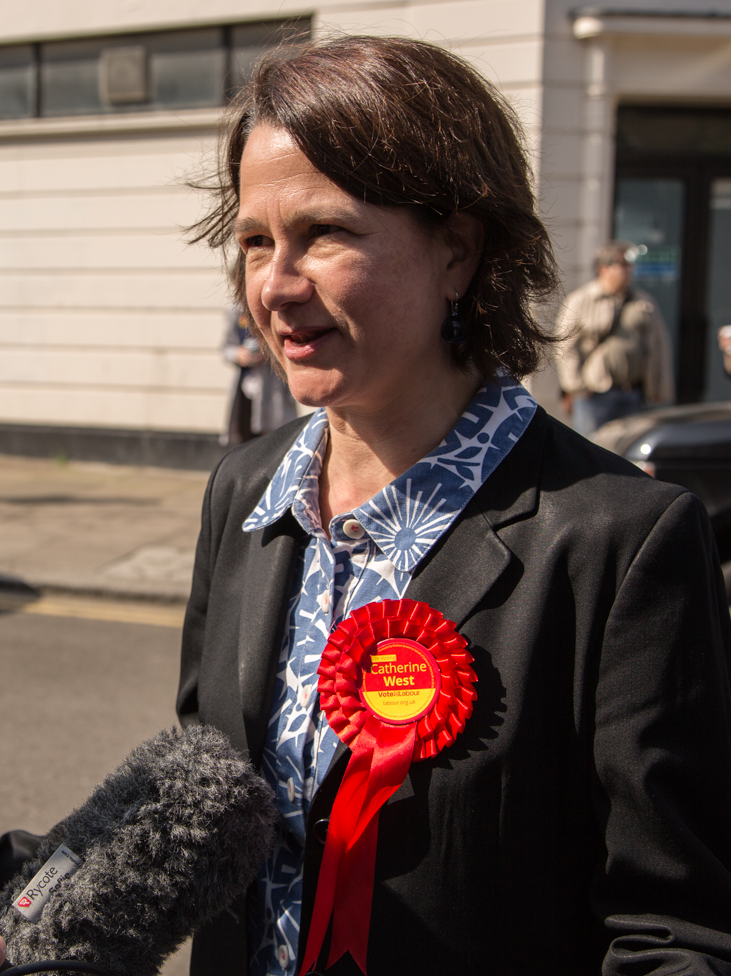
	First party	Second party
Leader	Steve Hitchins	Catherine West
Party	Liberal Democrats	Labour
Leader since	1997	2004
Leader's seat	St. Peter's (defeated)	Tollington
Last election	38 seats, 45.8%	10 seats, 35.7%
Seats won	24	23
Seat change	▼13	▲12
Popular vote	39,238	41,404
Percentage	33.1%	34.9%
Swing	▼12.7%	▼0.8%
	Third party	Fourth party
Leader	Katie Dawson	David Barnes
Party	Green	Conservative
Leader since	4 May 2006
Leader's seat	Highbury West	Highbury East (defeated)
Last election	0 seat, 10.8%	0 seats, 4.2%
Seats won	1	0
Seat change	▲1	Steady
Popular vote	19,736	14,121
Percentage	16.6%	11.9%
Swing	▲5.8%	▲7.7%
Leader of Largest Party before election
Steve Hitchins
Liberal Democrats
Subsequent Leader of Largest Party
James Kempton
Liberal Democrats

Map of the results of the 2006 Islington council election. Liberal Democrats in yellow, Labour in red and Green Party in green.

The 2006 Islington Council election took place on 4 May 2006 to elect members of Islington London Borough Council in London, England. The whole council was up for election and the Liberal Democrats lost overall control of the council to no overall control.

== Election result ==
The results saw the Liberal Democrats lose their majority on the council, after the Labour Party made a gain of 12 seats. The Green Party, meanwhile, gained a seat on the council.

Islington Council Election Result 2006
Party	Seats	Gains	Losses	Net gain/loss	Seats %	Votes %	Votes	+/−
Liberal Democrats	24	1	13	−12	50.0	33.1	39,238	−12.7%
Labour	23	13	1	+12	47.9	34.9	41,404	−0.8%
Green	1	1	0	+1	2.1	16.6	19,736	+5.8%
Conservative	0	0	1	−1	0.0	11.9	14,121	+7.7%
Ind. Working Class	0	0	0	0	0.0	2.6	3,142	+1.6%
Independent	0	0	0	0	0.0	0.6	658	−1.0%
CPA	0	0	0	0	0.0	0.2	289	+0.0%
Liberal	0	0	0	0	0.0	0.0	44	+0.0%

== Ward results ==
* – Existing Councillor seeking re-election.

Barnsbury (3)
Party	Candidate	Votes	%	±%
Labour	James Murray	1,072	37.8	
Labour	Jilani Chowdhury	986		
Labour	Mouna Hamitouche	973		
Liberal Democrats	Bridget Fox *	888	31.3	
Liberal Democrats	Emma Gowers	789		
Liberal Democrats	Linda Middleton	744		
Conservative	Martin Koder	445	15.7	
Conservative	Katherine Bereza	437		
Green	Nicola Baird	432	15.2	
Conservative	Lloyd Sampson	426		
Green	Elaine Londesborough	394		
Green	Jan Hallett	391		
Turnout		7,977	35.9	+7.9
Labour gain from Liberal Democrats		Swing		
Labour gain from Liberal Democrats		Swing		
Labour gain from Liberal Democrats		Swing		

Bunhill (3)
Party	Candidate	Votes	%	±%
Liberal Democrats	Donna Boffa	777	30.5	
Liberal Democrats	Ruth Polling	719		
Liberal Democrats	Jyoti Vaja *	708		
Labour	Simon Charles	644	25.3	
Labour	Troy Gallagher	643		
Ind. Working Class	Ben Mackmurdie	566	22.2	
Labour	Samuel McBratney	563		
Ind. Working Class	Gary O'Shea	544		
Ind. Working Class	Andy Taylor	504		
Conservative	Guy Black	316	12.4	
Conservative	Nicholas Sheffield	300		
Conservative	Eve Gannon	291		
Green	Damien O'Farrell	247	9.7	
Green	Lyn Bliss	202		
Green	Angela Thomson	164		
Turnout		7,188	29.4	+8.7
Liberal Democrats hold		Swing		
Liberal Democrats hold		Swing		
Liberal Democrats hold		Swing		

Caledonian (3)
Party	Candidate	Votes	%	±%
Labour	Paul Convery	1,025	40.5	
Labour	Ian Perry	1,022		
Labour	Lisa Spall	937		
Liberal Democrats	Dominic Curran	907	35.8	
Liberal Democrats	Carol Powell *	878		
Liberal Democrats	Adrian Hall	808		
Conservative	Stuart Cottis	310	12.3	
Conservative	Duncan Webster	305		
Conservative	Jacqueline Fage	299		
Green	Mark Chilver	288	11.4	
Green	Alexander Gordon	286		
Green	Sheena Etches	270		
Turnout		7,335	34.2	+6.9
Labour gain from Liberal Democrats		Swing		
Labour gain from Liberal Democrats		Swing		
Labour gain from Liberal Democrats		Swing		

Canonbury (3)
Party	Candidate	Votes	%	±%
Liberal Democrats	Lucy Watt *	994	39.9	
Liberal Democrats	Paula Belford	973		
Liberal Democrats	Barbara Smith *	959		
Labour	Melanie Rawlingson	740	29.7	
Labour	Timothy McLoughlin	682		
Labour	Christopher Roche	632		
Green	Christopher Hayles	400	16.1	
Conservative	Christopher Williams	357	14.3	
Conservative	Nckinsey Kerr	354		
Green	Jules Le Bihan	347		
Conservative	Nicholas Canty	346		
Green	Saif Osmani	279		
Turnout		7,063	31.7	+4.9
Liberal Democrats hold		Swing		
Liberal Democrats hold		Swing		
Liberal Democrats hold		Swing		

Clerkenwell (3)
Party	Candidate	Votes	%	±%
Liberal Democrats	George Allan *	753	29.4	
Liberal Democrats	Kelly Peasnell	662		
Liberal Democrats	Marisha Ray *	647		
Ind. Working Class	Sharon Hayward	542	21.2	
Ind. Working Class	Sarah Nash	525		
Labour	Timothy Clark	505	19.7	
Ind. Working Class	Lorna Reid	461		
Labour	Lydia Florence	457		
Labour	Daniel Neidle	436		
Conservative	Christopher Cameron-Doe	424	16.6	
Conservative	Simon Toms	369		
Conservative	David Vaiani	350		
Green	Michael Coffey	334	13.1	
Green	Pamela Nowicka	269		
Green	Gordon Ross	239		
Turnout		6,973	31.3	+6.3
Liberal Democrats hold		Swing		
Liberal Democrats hold		Swing		
Liberal Democrats hold		Swing		

Finsbury Park (3)
Party	Candidate	Votes	%	±%
Labour	Phil Kelly	938	38.7	
Labour	Michael O'Sullivan *	890		
Labour	Barbara Sidnell *	880		
Liberal Democrats	Andrea O'Halloran	769	31.7	
Liberal Democrats	Euan Cameron	726		
Liberal Democrats	Shahbaz Husain	708		
Green	Jane Hutchings	358	14.8	
Green	Deborah Maby	300		
Green	Charlotte Woodworth	295		
Conservative	Michael Heeneman	241	9.9	
Conservative	Smita Bhat	217		
Conservative	Oriel Clohessy	211		
CPA	Samantha Dixon	119	4.9	
CPA	Maria Aguiar	87		
CPA	Fernando Aguiar	83		
Turnout		6,822	30.6	+10.6
Labour hold		Swing		
Labour hold		Swing		
Labour hold		Swing		

Highbury East (3)
Party	Candidate	Votes	%	±%
Liberal Democrats	Laura Willoughby *	976	33.9	
Liberal Democrats	Terry Stacy *	870		
Liberal Democrats	John Gilbert	836		
Labour	Stephen Molyneaux	726	25.2	
Labour	Leo Schulz	726		
Labour	Michael Gilgunn	696		
Green	Emma Dixon	637	22.1	
Conservative	David Barnes *	540	18.8	
Conservative	Martine Oborne	493		
Green	Andrew Myer	491		
Green	James Humphreys	479		
Conservative	Tim Newark	450		
Turnout		7,920	36.5	+3.2
Liberal Democrats gain from Conservative		Swing		
Liberal Democrats hold		Swing		
Liberal Democrats hold		Swing		

Highbury West (3)
Party	Candidate	Votes	%	±%
Labour	Theresa Debono *	1,178	39.2	
Green	Katie Dawson	1,135	37.8	
Labour	Richard Greening *	1,119		
Green	Jon Nott	1,014		
Labour	Adrian Pulham *	944		
Green	Robin Latimer	935		
Conservative	Neil Lindsay	338	11.3	
Conservative	Anna-Lisa Ivin	309		
Liberal Democrats	Alison Marshall	307	10.2	
Conservative	Marie Philipsz	290		
Liberal Democrats	Nicky Bason	286		
Liberal Democrats	Philip Middleton	275		
Liberal	Paul Josling	44	1.5	
Turnout		8,174	34.8	+8.9
Labour hold		Swing		
Green gain from Labour		Swing		
Labour hold		Swing		

Hillrise (3)
Party	Candidate	Votes	%	±%
Liberal Democrats	Fiona Dunlop *	1,126	40.8	
Liberal Democrats	Greg Foxsmith	977		
Liberal Democrats	Julia Williams	958		
Labour	Marian Spall	920	33.3	
Labour	David Poyser	912		
Labour	Claudia Webbe	871		
Green	Michael Holloway	463	16.8	
Green	James North	373		
Green	Stephen Horne	329		
Conservative	Maureen Campbell	250	9.1	
Conservative	Paul Newman	190		
Turnout		7,369	34.1	+3.7
Liberal Democrats hold		Swing		
Liberal Democrats hold		Swing		
Liberal Democrats hold		Swing		

Holloway (3)
Party	Candidate	Votes	%	±%
Labour	Natasha Chatterjee	934	38.2	
Labour	Barry Edwards	921		
Labour	Paul Smith	911		
Liberal Democrats	Michelle Allison	842	34.5	
Liberal Democrats	Margot Dunn *	820		
Liberal Democrats	Iarla Kilbane-Dawe	732		
Green	Jennifer Chan	402	16.5	
Green	Claire Poyner	367		
Green	Pelham Davey	357		
Conservative	Andrew Austin	264	10.8	
Conservative	Paul Seligman	248		
Conservative	David Cheape	236		
Turnout		7,034	32.2	+5.3
Labour gain from Liberal Democrats		Swing		
Labour gain from Liberal Democrats		Swing		
Labour gain from Liberal Democrats		Swing		

Junction (3)
Party	Candidate	Votes	%	±%
Liberal Democrats	Ursula Woolley	1,015	35.9	
Liberal Democrats	Stefan Kasprzyk *	1,014		
Labour	Janet Burgess	936	33.1	
Liberal Democrats	Zubin Masani	873		
Labour	Patricia Clarke	870		
Labour	John Wyman	772		
Green	Rosemary House	386	13.6	
Green	Donald Lowe	320		
Green	Anthony Cooper	291		
Independent	Katharine Buffery	263	9.3	
Conservative	Mark Bennett	228	8.1	
Independent	Charles Ware	212		
Conservative	Francine Schwartz	200		
Conservative	Chris Skidmore	188		
Turnout		7,568	35.4	+4.8
Liberal Democrats hold		Swing		
Liberal Democrats hold		Swing		
Labour gain from Liberal Democrats		Swing		

Mildmay (3)
Party	Candidate	Votes	%	±%
Liberal Democrats	Anna Berent *	958	43.2	
Liberal Democrats	Rhodri Jamieson-Ball	818		
Liberal Democrats	Meral Ece *	814		
Labour	Beverley Bruce	793	35.8	
Labour	Conor McGinn	722		
Labour	Stuart Edwards	719		
Green	Ilana Morrissey	466	21.0	
Green	Christopher Ashby	441		
Green	Matthew Morrissey	365		
Turnout		6,096	27.5	+2.6
Liberal Democrats hold		Swing		
Liberal Democrats hold		Swing		
Liberal Democrats hold		Swing		

St George's (3)
Party	Candidate	Votes	%	±%
Liberal Democrats	Tracy Ismail	1,179	40.0	
Liberal Democrats	Andrew Cornwell	1,080		
Labour	Walter Burgess *	1,075	36.5	
Labour	Gary Heather	975		
Labour	Jacqueline Williams	938		
Liberal Democrats	Jennifer Smith	921		
Green	Kathryn Tansley	477	16.2	
Green	Judith Kleinman	474		
Green	Malcolm Powell	393		
Conservative	Patricia Napier	213	7.2	
Conservative	Hannah Hockey	212		
Conservative	John Wilkin	197		
Turnout		8,134	36.1	+4.2
Liberal Democrats hold		Swing		
Liberal Democrats hold		Swing		
Labour hold		Swing		

St. Mary's (3)
Party	Candidate	Votes	%	±%
Labour	Joan Coupland *	836	32.4	
Liberal Democrats	Emily Fieran-Reed	830	32.2	
Liberal Democrats	James Kempton *	809		
Liberal Democrats	Timothy Gordon	775		
Labour	John Greenshields	758		
Labour	Ian McLaughlin	718		
Conservative	Kim Anderson	447	17.3	
Conservative	Christopher Greenwood	403		
Conservative	Douglas Lloyd	403		
Green	Jonathan Hathaway	371	14.4	
Green	Eleanor Wood	371		
Green	Rosalind Sharpe	324		
Independent	Christopher Graham	95	3.7	
Independent	Richard Rosser	88		
Turnout		7,228	33.6	+5.1
Labour hold		Swing		
Liberal Democrats hold		Swing		
Liberal Democrats hold		Swing		

St. Peter's (3)
Party	Candidate	Votes	%	±%
Labour	Gary Doolan	849	32.4	
Labour	Michelle Coupland	823		
Labour	Martin Klute	817		
Liberal Democrats	Barbara Coventry	798	30.4	
Liberal Democrats	Stephen Hitchins *	791		
Liberal Democrats	Richard Washington	775		
Conservative	Victoria Chamberlin	496	18.9	
Conservative	Christopher Priestley	485		
Green	Agnes Buisson-Laing	480	18.3	
Conservative	David Shimwell	412		
Green	Susan Wilkinson	399		
Green	Richard Wood	333		
Turnout		7,458	33.1	+7.2
Labour gain from Liberal Democrats		Swing		
Labour gain from Liberal Democrats		Swing		
Labour gain from Liberal Democrats		Swing		

Tollington (3)
Party	Candidate	Votes	%	±%
Labour	Catherine West *	1,338	45.8	
Labour	Richard Watts	1,312		
Labour	Daniel Hulls	1,270		
Liberal Democrats	Khalid Oumar	827	28.3	
Liberal Democrats	Harriet Richmond	790		
Liberal Democrats	David Tibbs	757		
Green	Alison Boater	531	18.2	
Green	Peter Jones	429		
Green	Christine Muirhead	408		
Conservative	Duncan Connors	226	7.7	
Conservative	Fraser Crawford	222		
Conservative	Maria Psatha	183		
Turnout		8,293	34.0	+8.5
Labour hold		Swing		
Labour hold		Swing		
Labour hold		Swing		
