= Caroline Russell =

Green Party of England and Wales politician and activist (born 1962)

Caroline Russell AM
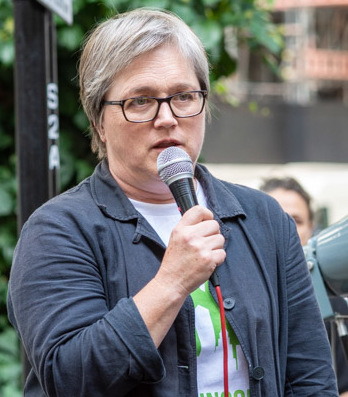
- Russell speaking at "Pedal on Parliament" in October 2018

Leader of the Greens in the London Assembly
- Incumbent
- Assumed office 19 October 2018
- Preceded by: Siân Berry

Member of the London Assembly as an additional member
- Incumbent
- Assumed office 6 May 2016

Councillor for Islington London Borough Council
- In office 22 May 2014 – 7 May 2026
- Ward: Highbury East (2014–2022); Highbury (2022–2026)
- Preceded by: John Gilbert

Personal details
- Born: 10 August 1962 (age 64)
- Party: Green Party of England and Wales
- Spouse: Sir Roly Keating (m. 1989)
- Children: 3
- Education: Goldsmiths, University of London; City University London
- Occupation: Politician, activist
- Website: caroline-russell.london

Caroline Russell (born 10 August 1962) is a British politician and activist serving as Leader of the Green Party in the London Assembly since October 2018, and a Member of the London Assembly (AM) as an additional since May 2016.

== Early life and education ==
Caroline Russell was born on 10 August 1962. She studied fine art at the Ruskin School of Drawing and Fine Art, University College, Oxford, and at Goldsmiths, University of London, graduating with a Master of Arts (MA) degree. She subsequently studied civil engineering at City, University of London, graduating with a Bachelor of Engineering (BEng) degree, and first moved to Islington in 1986.

== Political career ==
Russell became engaged in politics after the death of a young child in a traffic incident near where she lived. In 2012, Russell was serving as local transport spokesperson for the Green Party of England and Wales.

Russell was elected as a councillor for Highbury East on Islington Council in the May 2014 election by a margin of eight votes. She was the only member of the council not representing the Labour Party and so was the only opposition member. In October 2014, she called for Holloway Road to have a speed limit of 20 mph, a road controlled by Transport for London which had not been affected by Islington council's earlier 20 mph limit on all roads they controlled. In December of the same year, she criticised as "authoritarian" a Labour councillor's comments that cannabis users should not be allowed to live in council housing.

Russell stood for election in the 2015 general election for the Islington North constituency. The Labour candidate Jeremy Corbyn won, with Russell coming in third place with 5,043 votes and a voteshare of 10.2%. She was elected as a London-wide Member of the London Assembly in 2016, having been the second candidate on the Green Party list. In October 2018, she condemned the Labour mayor of London Sadiq Khan over plans for the Silvertown Tunnel, a new road tunnel under the Thames that she said would "lead to more pollution and congestion". She again contested the Islington North constituency in the 2017 general election, this time coming fourth with 2,229 votes constituting 4.1% of votes cast as Corbyn, by this time Labour's leader, won another mandate. In December 2017, she promoted and participated in a "human barrier" demonstration in favour of safer bike lanes. Russell was re-elected as an Islington councillor in the 2018 election. In July 2018, she called for Khan to reduce speed limits to 20 mph in outer London as well as inner London. In August 2018, she was chair of the environmental committee on the London Assembly. In December of the same year, she successfully proposed a motion at the London Assembly that brought forward the city's target to be carbon neutral from 2050 to 2030.

In April 2019, a report Russell commissioned into the impact of the climate crisis on London was released. In the following month, Transport for London suspended advertising from a list of countries with poor human rights records after Russell raised the issue. In August 2019, she was arrested at a protest against the prorogation of Parliament. In September of the same year, after flooding in London underground stations, she highlighted findings of her report from earlier in the year that 23 underground stations were vulnerable to flooding. She stood in the 2019 general election, again for Islington North, and came in 4th place with 4,326 votes making up 8.0% of the overall vote while Corbyn was re-elected. Russell was the second candidate on the Green Party list for the 2021 London Assembly election, which had been scheduled for 2020 before being delayed due to the COVID-19 pandemic. She won re-election. She stood down from Islington Council at the May 2026 local election to focus on her London Assembly role.

== Personal life ==
In 1989, Russell married Roly Keating. They have three children: one son and two daughters. Since her husband's knighthood, her legal title is "Lady Keating".
