= Benali Hamdache =

Green Party of England and Wales politician

Councillor Benali Hamdache AM
- Hamdache in 2026

Member of the London Assembly as an additional member
- Incumbent
- Assumed office 11 May 2026
- Preceded by: Zoë Garbett

Councillor for Islington London Borough Council
- Incumbent
- Assumed office 5 May 2022
- Ward: Highbury
- Preceded by: Sue Lukes

Personal details
- Born: Benali-Reda Hamdache
- Party: Green Party of England and Wales
- Occupation: Politician

Benali Reda Hamdache is a British politician who has served as a member of the London Assembly for the Green Party since May 2026. He has served as a councillor for Highbury ward on Islington London Borough Council since May 2022. As of 2025, he was leader of the Islington Green group.

== Early life ==
Hamdache was born to an Algerian father and an English mother who met at university and grew up in Nottingham. Hamdache graduated with a Bachelor of Science from Aston University in 2010 and began a PhD at the University of Sussex.

== Career ==
Hamdache stood in Islington South and Finsbury in the 2017 United Kingdom general election, coming fourth.

In September 2024, he helped found the Greens Organise pressure group.

Hamdache has been a Green Party list candidate in every London Assembly election since 2016. He was fifth on the Green London-wide list in the 2024 London Assembly election, in which three Green MLAs were elected — Siân Berry, Caroline Russell, and Zack Polanski. Berry resigned from the Assembly three days after being elected, being replaced by fourth-placed candidate Zoë Garbett.

On 11 May 2026, Hamdache became a Member of the London Assembly, after Garbett's resignation following her election as Mayor of Hackney.

== Personal life ==
Hamdache is openly gay.
