= 2014 Islington London Borough Council election =

2014 local election in England

2014 Islington Council election
- 22 May 2014

All 48 council seats

	First party	Second party	Third party
Party	Labour	Green	Liberal Democrats
Last election	35 seats, 39.5%	0 seats, 12.7%	13 seats, 31.6%
Seats won	47	1	0
Seat change	▲12	▲1	▼13
Popular vote	93,416	32,156	9,191
Percentage	55.9%	19.3%	14.9%
Swing	▲16.4%	▲6.6%	▼16.7%
- Map of the results of the 2014 Islington council election. Greens in green and Labour in red.
Council control before election
Labour
Subsequent Council control
Labour

The 2014 Islington Council election took place on 22 May 2014 to elect members of Islington Borough Council in London, England. This was on the same day as other local elections.

The final result was 47 seats for the Labour Party and 1 seat for the Green Party of England and Wales. The Labour Party received 56 per cent of the vote, its highest total in Islington since 1974. The Liberal Democrats lost all its seats despite having controlled the Council as a minority administration from 2006–2010.

== Election result ==
Islington Council Election Result 2014
Party	Seats	Gains	Losses	Net gain/loss	Seats %	Votes %	Votes	+/−
Labour	47	12	0	+12	97.9	55.9	93,416	+16.4
Green	1	1	0	+1	2.1	19.3	32,156	+6.6
Liberal Democrats	0	0	13	−13	0.0	14.6	24,372	−17.0
Conservative	0	0	0	0	0.0	9.4	15,681	−6.3
UKIP	0	0	0	0	0.0	0.6	1,049	+0.5
TUSC	0	0	0	0	0.0	0.4	259	N/A
Socialist (GB)	0	0	0	0	0.0	0.1	90	N/A

== Ward results ==
Barnsbury
Party	Candidate	Votes	%	±%
Labour	James Murray	2,110	58.4	+15.0
Labour	Jilani Chowdhury	1,948	53.9	+14.8
Labour	Mouna Hamitouche	1,910	52.9	+15.6
Conservative	Stuart Cullen	710	19.6	−2.2
Conservative	Joseph Eldridge	604	16.7	−5.0
Conservative	Alicia Simms	594	16.4	−3.7
Green	Harry Hicks	467	12.9	+4.0
Green	Rosie Magudia	447	12.4	+2.3
Liberal Democrats	David Christmas	400	11.1	−15.3
Green	Matthew Parsons	327	9.0	−0.5
Liberal Democrats	Kristina Lewis	309	8.6	−15.9
Liberal Democrats	Laura Willoughby	286	7.9	−14.2
TUSC	Lesley Woodburn	100	2.8	N/A
Turnout		3,614	39.8	−21.8
Labour hold		Swing		
Labour hold		Swing		
Labour hold		Swing		

Bunhill
Party	Candidate	Votes	%	±%
Labour	Troy Gallagher	1,762	49.8	+12.1
Labour	Claudia Webbe	1,663	47.0	+7.0
Labour	Robert Khan	1,541	43.6	+10.3
Conservative	Craig Barber	663	18.8	−1.7
Conservative	Flora Coleman	618	17.5	−2.6
Conservative	Orson Francescone	570	16.1	−1.3
UKIP	Peter Muswell	525	14.9	N/A
Green	Tom Bowker	455	12.9	+2.0
Green	Leigh Elston	429	12.1	+4.8
Green	Ben Hickey	425	12.0	+7.0
Liberal Democrats	Joseph Trotter	352	10.0	−21.2
Liberal Democrats	Adrian Hall	321	9.1	−22.9
Liberal Democrats	Kelly Wright	308	8.7	−21.1
Turnout		3,535	33.8	−21.8
Labour hold		Swing		
Labour hold		Swing		
Labour hold		Swing		

Caledonian
Party	Candidate	Votes	%	±%
Labour	Paul Convery	2,372	66.1	+21.9
Labour	Rupert Perry	1,954	54.4	+9.5
Labour	Una O'Halloran	1,907	53.1	+13.4
Green	Alex Gordon	670	18.7	+7.4
Green	Sarah Marks	585	16.3	+5.6
Conservative	Stuart Cottis	492	13.7	−1.9
Green	Ozoda Muminova	441	12.3	+4.5
Conservative	Duncan Webster	433	12.1	−3.2
Conservative	Richard Pinder	417	11.6	−2.1
Liberal Democrats	Iolanda Costide	382	10.6	−20.5
Liberal Democrats	Tim Johnson	320	8.9	−17.0
Liberal Democrats	Hannah Ridzuan-Allen	252	7.0	−17.8
Turnout		3,589	36.5	−23.5
Labour hold		Swing		
Labour hold		Swing		
Labour hold		Swing		

Canonbury
Party	Candidate	Votes	%	±%
Labour	Alexander Diner	1,569	46.6	+13.4
Labour	Clare Jeapes	1,556	46.3	+13.4
Labour	Nicholas Wayne	1,413	42.0	+10.9
Liberal Democrats	Alex Cox	805	23.9	−10.9
Liberal Democrats	Barbara Smith	716	21.3	−10.1
Liberal Democrats	Mihir Magudia	613	18.2	−10.0
Conservative	Amo Kalar	467	13.9	−5.0
Green	Lilli Geissendorfer	464	13.8	+3.3
Green	Georgina Turner	464	13.8	+5.2
Conservative	Nigel Watts	441	13.1	−5.3
Conservative	Jana Hrnciarova	418	12.4	−5.9
Green	Richard Halvorsen	391	11.6	+2.9
Turnout		3,364	37.1	−27.5
Labour hold		Swing		
Labour hold		Swing		
Labour gain from Liberal Democrats		Swing		

Clerkenwell
Party	Candidate	Votes	%	±%
Labour	Raphael Andrews	1,553	48.8	+15.1
Labour	Alice Donovan	1,395	43.8	+10.6
Labour	James Court	1,385	43.5	+12.8
Liberal Democrats	Tahmid Chowdhury	690	21.7	−10.6
Liberal Democrats	James Williamson	680	21.4	−6.9
Green	Rachel Darwazeh	599	18.8	+7.8
Liberal Democrats	Alan Muhammed	561	17.6	−10.3
Conservative	Pauline Tucker	559	17.6	−3.4
Conservative	Mark Lim	485	15.2	−5.8
Green	James Humphreys	455	14.3	+4.0
Green	Angela Thomson	394	12.4	+2.8
Turnout		3,183	37.7	−20.3
Labour hold		Swing		
Labour hold		Swing		
Labour gain from Liberal Democrats		Swing		

Finsbury Park
Party	Candidate	Votes	%	±%
Labour	Gary Heather	2,648	66.3	+13.6
Labour	Mick O'Sullivan	2,481	62.1	+14.6
Labour	Asima Shaikh	2,408	60.3	+12.1
Green	Nicola Baird	948	23.7	+8.5
Green	Robin Latimer	781	19.6	+7.2
Green	Fran Boait	771	19.3	+6.4
Liberal Democrats	Anna Habermann	400	10.0	−13.0
Liberal Democrats	Jack Fletcher	360	9.0	−10.0
Liberal Democrats	Hatty Richmond	318	8.0	−10.8
Turnout		3,993	37.1	−19.9
Labour hold		Swing		
Labour hold		Swing		
Labour hold		Swing		

Highbury East
Party	Candidate	Votes	%	±%
Labour	Osh Gantly	1,514	37.4	+7.2
Labour	Aysegul Erdogan	1,430	35.3	+5.5
Green	Caroline Russell	1,214	30.0	+10.9
Labour	Muhammed Kalaam	1,206	29.8	+6.1
Liberal Democrats	Julie Horten	1,204	29.7	−13.1
Liberal Democrats	Terry Stacy	1,185	29.3	−7.6
Liberal Democrats	John Gilbert	1,138	28.1	−14.3
Green	Charlie Kiss	867	21.4	+10.2
Green	Susanna Rustin	721	17.8	+6.9
Conservative	Connor Coleman	411	10.1	−4.2
Conservative	Christopher Williams	375	9.3	−4.5
UKIP	Greg Clough	247	6.1	N/A
Turnout		4,051	44.2	−23.4
Labour gain from Liberal Democrats		Swing		
Labour gain from Liberal Democrats		Swing		
Green gain from Liberal Democrats		Swing		

Highbury West
Party	Candidate	Votes	%	±%
Labour	Theresa Debono	2,680	56.4	+12.1
Labour	Richard Greening	2,549	53.7	+11.5
Labour	Andy Hull	2,336	49.2	+12.5
Green	Rosalind Sharpe	1,074	22.6	−6.9
Green	Ernestas Jegorovas	1,046	22.0	+0.1
Green	Andrew Mayer	1,011	21.3	+3.0
Conservative	Alex Burghart	869	18.3	+3.0
Conservative	James Rooke	653	13.8	+0.5
Conservative	Simon Philip	551	11.6	−1.6
Liberal Democrats	Ed Cooke	439	9.2	−14.8
Liberal Democrats	Philip Middleton	354	7.5	−11.4
Liberal Democrats	Gabby Mann	345	7.3	−5.9
Turnout		4,749	39.7	−24.2
Labour hold		Swing		
Labour hold		Swing		
Labour hold		Swing		

Hillrise
Party	Candidate	Votes	%	±%
Labour	Marian Spall	2,065	55.7	+15.3
Labour	Michelline Ngongo	1,930	52.0	+14.0
Labour	David Poyser	1,925	51.9	+14.9
Liberal Democrats	Lorraine Constantinou	959	25.9	−13.1
Liberal Democrats	Carl Quilliam	856	23.1	−15.8
Liberal Democrats	Victor Kaufman	761	20.5	−14.3
Green	Jayne Forbes	727	19.6	+8.7
Green	Mary Adshead	711	19.2	+7.8
Green	Alex Rendall	530	14.3	+4.4
Turnout		3,708	41.9	−21.4
Labour hold		Swing		
Labour gain from Liberal Democrats		Swing		
Labour gain from Liberal Democrats		Swing		

Holloway
Party	Candidate	Votes	%	±%
Labour	Paul Smith	2,470	59.7	+15.6
Labour	Rakhia Ismail	2,266	54.8	+9.3
Labour	Diarmaid Ward	2,222	53.7	+9.9
Green	Jenni Chan	996	24.1	+13.6
Green	Claire Poyner	905	21.9	+8.9
Green	Ciaran Whitehead	837	20.2	+9.9
Liberal Democrats	Paul Smith	564	13.6	−14.2
Liberal Democrats	Margot Dunn	564	13.6	−11.1
Liberal Democrats	David Kelly	519	12.6	−18.8
Turnout		4,135	36.9	−22.9
Labour hold		Swing		
Labour hold		Swing		
Labour hold		Swing		

Junction
Party	Candidate	Votes	%	±%
Labour	Janet Burgess	2,228	63.7	+21.1
Labour	Kaya Makarau-Schwartz	1,938	55.4	+21.2
Labour	Tim Nicholls	1,779	50.9	+16.3
Green	Jill Renwick	720	20.6	+7.6
Green	Mick Holloway	717	20.5	+9.6
Green	Daniel Hudson	621	17.8	+8.2
Conservative	Michael Collins	361	10.3	+0.2
Liberal Democrats	Stefan Kasprzyk	333	9.5	−28.2
Conservative	Riddhi Bhalla	320	9.1	−0.6
Conservative	Oliver Jonathan	314	9.0	+0.3
Liberal Democrats	Giorgia Gamba	297	8.5	−31.3
Liberal Democrats	Victoria Savvides	245	7.0	−31.7
Socialist (GB)	Bill Martin	90	2.6	N/A
Turnout		3,498	38.4	−25.5
Labour hold		Swing		
Labour gain from Liberal Democrats		Swing		
Labour gain from Liberal Democrats		Swing		

Mildmay
Party	Candidate	Votes	%	±%
Labour	Joe Caluori	2,041	57.1	+20.9
Labour	Jenny Kay	2,020	56.5	+16.1
Labour	Olly Parker	1,898	53.1	+18.6
Green	Jon Nott	613	17.1	+2.7
Green	Malcolm Powell	575	16.1	+6.6
Green	Dudley Ross	570	15.9	+7.0
Conservative	Benjamin Davies	366	10.2	−3.5
Liberal Democrats	Julie Whittaker	354	9.9	−28.7
Conservative	Alexandra Eldridge	343	9.6	−2.2
Liberal Democrats	Turhan Ozen	279	7.8	−24.4
UKIP	Angus Small	277	7.7	N/A
Conservative	Martin Moyes	265	7.4	−4.2
Liberal Democrats	Paul Symes	255	7.1	−27.5
TUSC	Omar Esen	159	4.4	N/A
Turnout		3,575	38.7	−21.4
Labour hold		Swing		
Labour gain from Liberal Democrats		Swing		
Labour hold		Swing		

St George's
Party	Candidate	Votes	%	±%
Labour	Kat Fletcher	2,402	61.1	+27.3
Labour	Satnam Gill	2,121	54.0	+22.3
Labour	Nick Ward	1,975	50.3	+18.9
Liberal Democrats	Tracy Ismail	984	25.0	−19.8
Green	Deborah Maby	814	20.7	+6.5
Liberal Democrats	Julian Gregory	743	18.9	−24.2
Green	Bernadette Wren	721	18.4	+3.8
Liberal Democrats	Alice Thomas	719	18.3	−14.3
Green	Benali Hamdache	683	17.4	+5.8
Turnout		3,929	42.1	−21.9
Labour hold		Swing		
Labour gain from Liberal Democrats		Swing		
Labour gain from Liberal Democrats		Swing		

St Mary's
Party	Candidate	Votes	%	±%
Labour	Angela Picknell	1,719	52.7	+18.1
Labour	Gary Poole	1,581	48.5	+17.6
Labour	Nurullah Turan	1,460	44.8	+12.2
Green	Caroline Allen	729	22.4	+9.9
Conservative	Thomas Duke	559	17.2	−3.9
Conservative	Mags Joseph	554	17.0	−0.2
Conservative	Victoria Lim	528	16.2	−4.2
Green	Sydney Leaman	498	15.3	+4.6
Green	Adrian Williams	490	15.0	+7.2
Liberal Democrats	Rosie Day	433	13.3	−20.3
Liberal Democrats	Richard Heseltine	353	10.8	−21.3
Liberal Democrats	Nick Manners	289	8.9	−20.2
Turnout		3,259	36.3	−27.8
Labour hold		Swing		
Labour hold		Swing		
Labour gain from Liberal Democrats		Swing		

St Peter's
Party	Candidate	Votes	%	±%
Labour	Martin Klute	2,117	60.1	+23.8
Labour	Gary Doolan	2,088	59.2	+22.8
Labour	Alice Perry	2,085	59.1	+22.2
Conservative	Evan Williams	724	20.5	−7.2
Conservative	Oriel Hutchinson	709	20.1	−2.7
Conservative	Patricia Napier	708	20.1	−1.7
Green	Michael Coffey	674	19.1	+9.3
Green	Veronica Pasteur	453	12.9	+8.0
Green	Christian Spurrier	418	11.9	+3.7
Liberal Democrats	Barbara Coventry	414	11.7	−19.3
Liberal Democrats	Anna Malone	389	11.0	−9.9
Liberal Democrats	David Sant	320	9.1	−17.6
Turnout		3,525	38.2	−25.8
Labour hold		Swing		
Labour hold		Swing		
Labour hold		Swing		

Tollington
Party	Candidate	Votes	%	±%
Labour	Richard Watts	2,355	60.5	+20.1
Labour	Flora Williamson	2,320	59.6	+17.0
Labour	Jean-Roger Kaseki	2,302	59.2	+20.3
Green	Ann Boater	1,006	25.9	+5.3
Green	Rosie Green	951	24.4	+6.4
Green	Stephen Horne	752	19.3	+4.1
Liberal Democrats	Ruth Polling	400	10.3	−17.3
Liberal Democrats	George Allan	393	10.1	−15.1
Liberal Democrats	David Thorpe	313	8.0	−16.5
Turnout		3,890	38.6	−21.9
Labour hold		Swing		
Labour hold		Swing		
Labour hold		Swing		
