= Richard Watts (politician) =

British politician

Mayor of London's Deputy Chief of Staff
- Incumbent
- Assumed office May 2021

Leader of Islington London Borough Council
- In office 10 October 2013 – 20 May 2021
- Deputy: Janet Burgess
- Preceded by: Catherine West
- Succeeded by: Kaya Comer-Schwartz

Councillor for Islington London Borough Council
- In office 4 May 2006 – 20 May 2021
- Ward: Tollington
- Preceded by: Daniel Bonner

Personal details
- Born: 1975 (age 50–51)
- Party: Labour
- Education: Durham University

Richard Watts (born 1975), is a Labour Party politician. He is currently Deputy Chief of Staff to the Mayor of London, Sadiq Khan.

He was previously Council Leader of Islington London Borough Council, England. He was elected to that role in October 2013. In the borough elections of May 2014 he led the Islington Labour Party to an increased majority on the council.

== Early life ==
Watts attended Haywood Comprehensive School, Nottingham. He graduated with a degree in politics from Durham University and before this worked in the Pretty Polly tights factory in Nottinghamshire.

== Career ==
Watts has lived in Islington since 1998. He represented the ultra-safe Tollington ward in the north of Islington from the 2006 until stepping down in 2021, during which time he led the council's Labour group.

Before becoming a full-time member of Islington Council's Executive, Watts ran the Children's Food Campaign, a national campaign to improve children's diets. Previously he worked for a number of different campaigns and a consultancy organisation, which led to some work in the Balkans, including working in Kosovo helping develop democratic political parties.

Watts is concerned about the effects of austerity on local government provision. Watts stated “unprecedented” funding pressure also demand for services addressing adult and children's social care and homelessness was “pushing councils to the limit. As a result less money is being spent on the other services that keep our communities running such as libraries, local roads, early intervention and local welfare support. Losing a further £1.3bn of central government funding at this time is going to tip many councils over the edge. Many local authorities will reach the point where they only have the funds to provide statutory responsibilities and it will be our local communities and economies that will suffer the consequences.”
