= James Humphreys (author) =

James Humphreys (born 1967) is a political analyst and author. He grew up in Cambridgeshire and studied Anglo-Saxon, Norse and Celtic Studies at Cambridge University.

== Civil service and political career ==
Humphreys worked as a civil servant, negotiating environmental legislation with the European Union and later becoming Head of Corporate Communications at the Prime Minister's Office. He was Professor of Government at City University London from 2005 to 2009.

He is a member of the Green Party and became chair of the party in 2008. He stood for election in Islington South and Finsbury in the 2005 and 2010 general elections and for Islington Council also in 2010. He was an adviser to the former Green Party Member of Parliament Caroline Lucas.

He works for the public policy consultancy Woodnewton, and was formerly a trustee of the Woodland Trust.

== Author ==
Humphreys is the author of Negotiating in the European Union: How to Make the Brussels Machine Work for You and collaborated with Caroline Lucas on two books, Honourable Friends?: Parliament and the Fight for Change and Another England: How to Reclaim our National Story.

Quite separately, Humphreys has pursued a career as writer of popular fiction. Starting with Sleeping Partner in 2000, he received praise from Colin Dexter, who stated that the book was: "[a] splendid debut in crime fiction – more please, Mr Humphreys".

Humphreys wrote Riptide in 2001, which The Observer said to be "an accomplished, intriguing story". In 2010, he published a book of ghost stories, called The Mincer and Other Stories to raise funds for the Woodland Trust.

Trade union offices
Preceded by Richard Mallender	Chair of the Green Party of England and Wales; 2008–2009	Succeeded by Jayne Forbes
