= Islington London Borough Council elections =

UK local government elections

A map showing the wards of Islington from 2002 to 2022

Islington London Borough Council in London, England is elected every four years. Since the last boundary changes in 2022, 51 councillors have been elected from 17 wards.

== Council elections ==
Year	Labour	Liberal Democrats (Note: Liberal Party, 1964–1978; SDP–Liberal Alliance, 1982–1986.)	Conservative	Green (Note: Green Party (UK), 1986–1990.)	Independent	Council control after election
1964	60	0	0	–	0	Labour
1968	10	0	47	–	3	Conservative
1971	60	0	0	–	0	Labour
1974	60	0	0	–	0	Labour
1978 (Note: Boundary changes reduced the number of seats by eight.)	50	0	2	–	0	Labour
1982	51	1	0	–	–	Labour
1986	36	16	0	0	–	Labour
1990	49	3	0	0	0	Labour
1994 (Note: Boundary changes took place but the number of seats remained the same. (Note: The City and London Borough Boundaries Order 1993) (Note: The Hackney, Haringey and Islington (London Borough Boundaries) Order 1993) (Note: The Haringey and Islington (London Borough Boundaries) Order 1993))	39	12	1	0	0	Labour
1998	26	26	0	0	0	No overall control
2002 (Note: Boundary changes reduced the number of seats by four.)	10	38	0	0	0	Liberal Democrats
2006	23	24	0	1	0	No overall control
2010	35	13	0	0	0	Labour
2014	47	0	0	1	–	Labour
2018	47	0	0	1	–	Labour
2022 (Note: Boundary changes increased the number of seats by three.)	48	0	0	3	0	Labour
2026	32	0	0	19	0	Labour

=== Borough result maps ===
2002 results map

2006 results map

2010 results map

2014 results map

2018 results map

2022 results map

2026 results map

== By-election results ==
=== 1964-1968 ===
There were no by-elections.

=== 1968-1971 ===
There were no by-elections.

=== 1971-1974 ===
Hillrise by-election, 15 June 1972
Party	Candidate	Votes	%	±%
Labour	J. Lethbridge	594		
Conservative	J. T. Hanvey	327		
Communist	J. E. Brady	71		
Turnout			17.2%	

Quadrant by-election, 15 June 1972
Party	Candidate	Votes	%	±%
Labour	C. Hasler	1,356		
Conservative	R. Devonald-Lewis	726		
Liberal	A. A. S. Butt Philip	133		
Liberal Party New Policy Group	R. E. Girolami	23		
Retail Distributor	F. G. S. White	6		
Turnout			20.9%	

Junction by-election, 16 November 1972
Party	Candidate	Votes	%	±%
Labour	M. McCann	700		
Conservative	R. R. F. Kinghorn	418		
Turnout			13.9%	

St George's by-election, 16 November 1972
Party	Candidate	Votes	%	±%
Labour	P. Kershaw	517		
Conservative	J. T. Hanvey	286		
Turnout			10.7%	

Barnsbury by-election, 12 April 1973
Party	Candidate	Votes	%	±%
Labour	M. P. Reynolds	1,097		
Labour	M. Watson	1,064		
Conservative	J. R. Rush	374		
Conservative	J. Szemerey	350		
Official Liberal	A. W. Capel	216		
Official Liberal	E. Jacomb	203		
Liberal	Alan Lomas	52		
Liberal	Elsie Girolami	36		
Turnout			33.1	

Highview by-election, 12 April 1973
Party	Candidate	Votes	%	±%
Labour	J. C. Evans	1,067		
Conservative	T. S. K. Yeo	473		
Liberal	M. J. Bird	238		
Communist	B. A. Brady	158		
Community-Oriented Independent	D. C. Thurnell	87		
Turnout			28.0%	

Canonbury by-election, 28 June 1973
Party	Candidate	Votes	%	±%
Labour	F. Johns	1,538		
Official Liberal	S. F. Hampson	393		
Conservative	N. B. Baile	240		
Turnout			21.4%	

=== 1974-1978 ===
Highbury by-election, 6 November 1975
Party	Candidate	Votes	%	±%
Labour	Christopher M. B. King	839		
Conservative	Arthur H. S. Hull	633		
Liberal	Margot J. Dunn	616		
National Front	Frank C. Newland	230		
Communist	David R. Wynn	71		
Independent Labour	Charles V. Connell	66		
Turnout			29.6	

Highview by-election, 26 May 1977
Party	Candidate	Votes	%	±%
Labour	Steve Bundred	998		
Conservative	Neil D. Kerr	834		
Liberal	Raymond C. James	261		
Turnout			31.6	

=== 1990-1994 ===
Holloway by-election, 25 July 1991
Party	Candidate	Votes	%	±%
Labour	Michael Boye-Anawomah	753	31.3	
Liberal Democrats	Margot J. Dunn	727	30.2	
Tenants' & residents' movement	Patrick McCann	468	19.5	
Conservative	Tracey A. Braddick	355	14.8	
Green	Ann C. Wainwright	79	3.3	
Independent	Anthony W. Bright	23	1.0	
Turnout			38.6	
Labour hold		Swing		

The by-election was called following the resignation of Cllr David Yorath.

Clerkenwell by-election, 7 November 1991
Party	Candidate	Votes	%	±%
Liberal Democrats	Sarah Ludford	969	34.4	
Labour	Christina L. Glover	867	30.8	
Tenants' & residents' movement	Helen M. Cagnoni	487	17.3	
Conservative	Mark Eldridge	383	13.6	
Independent Labour	Anthony W. Bright	59	2.1	
Green	Karen S. Stack	49		1.7
Turnout			39.5	
Liberal Democrats gain from Labour		Swing		

The by-election was called following the death of Cllr Paul Matthews.

Junction by-election, 9 July 1992
Party	Candidate	Votes	%	±%
Labour	Lydia A. Richards	847	64.7	
Green	Beatrice M. Rolph	193	14.7	
Conservative	William D. Thomas	189	14.4	
Liberal Democrats	Kenneth S. Tranter	81	6.2	
Turnout			20.2	
Labour hold		Swing		

The by-election was called following the resignation of Cllr Candy Atherton.

Quadrant by-election, 9 July 1992
Party	Candidate	Votes	%	±%
Conservative	Clive D. Blackwood	925	53.4	
Labour	Christina L. Glover	640	37.0	
Liberal Democrats	Elizabeth J. Rorison	126	7.3	
Green	John H. Ackers	40	2.3	
Turnout			34.9	
Conservative gain from Labour		Swing		

The by-election was called following the resignation of Cllr Jane Mackay.

Sussex by-election, 9 July 1992
Party	Candidate	Votes	%	±%
Labour	Stephen Twigg	700	47.2	
Liberal Democrats	Matthew T. Ryan	637	43.0	
Green	Ann C. Wainwright	82	5.5	
Conservative	Mahendra Oza	64	4.3	
Turnout			33.3	
Labour hold		Swing		

The by-election was called following the resignation of Cllr Christopher King.

St George's by-election, 27 May 1993
Party	Candidate	Votes	%	±%
Labour	Peter D. Chalk	1,264	50.4	
Liberal Democrats	Bridget C. Fox	560	22.3	
Conservative	Bairam Rifat	510	20.3	
Green	Beatrice M. Rolph	173	6.9	
Turnout			38.6	
Labour hold		Swing		

The by-election was called following the resignation of Cllr Chris Adamson.

=== 1994-1998 ===
Canonbury East by-election, 12 October 1995
Party	Candidate	Votes	%	±%
Labour	Terence J. Herbert	834	46.7	
Liberal Democrats	Margaret M. Lally	831	46.6	
Tenants & Residents	Ernest J. W. Bayliss	344		
Conservative	Richard Campbell	94	5.3	
Green	Susan Wilkinson	26	1.5	
Majority		3		
Turnout		1785	42	
Labour hold		Swing		

The by-election was called following the resignation of Cllr James Purnell.

Junction by-election, 10 July 1997
Party	Candidate	Votes	%	±%
Labour	Janet D. Burgess	793	72.6	+10.9
Conservative	Oliver S. P. Judge	134	12.3	+1.9
Liberal Democrats	Heija Jaff	90	8.2	−7.2
Green	Victoria Olliver	76	7.0	−5.7
Majority		659	60.3	
Turnout		1,093	17.0	
Labour hold		Swing		

The by-election was called following the resignation of Cllr Michael Tal.

Sussex by-election, 10 July 1997
Party	Candidate	Votes	%	±%
Liberal Democrats	Graham A. Baker	616	48.4	+15.8
Labour	Jenny Rathbone	567	44.5	−11.8
Green	Robin W. Latimer	49	3.8	−2.4
Conservative	Rebecca M. Baty	41	3.2	−1.8
Majority		49	3.8	
Turnout		1,273	27.7	
Liberal Democrats gain from Labour		Swing		

The by-election was called following the resignation of Cllr Stephen Twigg.

=== 1998-2002 ===
Clerkenwell by-election, 28 October 1999
Party	Candidate	Votes	%	±%
Liberal Democrats	Isabelle Humphreys	1,127	55.4	−4.7
Labour	Timothy Clark	536	26.4	+0.7
Independent	Helen M. Cagnoni	255	12.5	+12.5
Conservative	Gordon A. Dear	82	4.0	−1.5
Green	James L. Goggin	33	1.6	−7.1
Majority		591	29.1	
Turnout		2,033	27.8	
Liberal Democrats hold		Swing		

The by-election was called following the resignation of Cllr Sarah Ludford.

Hillrise by-election, 16 December 1999
Party	Candidate	Votes	%	±%
Liberal Democrats	Paul J. Fox	1,317	61.4	+39.8
Labour	Adrian M. J. Pulham	695	32.4	−20.1
Green	Michael H. W. Holloway	60	2.8	−10.1
Independent	Ann Wood	39	1.8	+1.8
Conservative	Maureen L. Campbell	33	1.5	−11.4
Majority		622	29.0	
Turnout		2,144	32.0	
Liberal Democrats gain from Labour		Swing		

The by-election was called following the death of Cllr Milton Babulall.

Junction by-election, 7 June 2001
Party	Candidate	Votes	%	±%
Labour	Patricia M. Clarke	1,661	47.1	−8.2
Liberal Democrats	Stefan A. Kaprzyk	1,253	35.5	+15.2
Green	Jon R. Nott	347	9.8	−5.6
Conservative	Abubaker S. Ajiya	266	7.5	−1.4
Majority		408	11.6	
Turnout		3,527	49.9	
Labour hold		Swing		

The by-election was called following the resignation of Cllr Sandra Marks.

=== 2002-2006 ===
Bunhill by-election, 23 January 2003
Party	Candidate	Votes	%	±%
Liberal Democrats	Donna Boffa	797	44.9	−6.6
Labour	Jasin Kaplan	412	23.2	−0.3
Ind. Working Class	Gary O'Shea	398	22.4	+22.4
Conservative	Matthew Priestley	111	6.3	−0.2
Green	Malcolm Powell	57	3.2	−5.2
Majority		385	21.7	
Turnout		1,775	22.2	
Liberal Democrats hold		Swing		

The by-election was called following the death of Cllr Rosetta Wooding.

Barnsbury by-election, 26 June 2003
Party	Candidate	Votes	%	±%
Liberal Democrats	Emma C. Gowers	940	59.9	+11.9
Labour	Joseph Simpson	311	19.8	−5.8
Conservative	Nicholas Millwood	182	11.6	+3.8
Green	Ben Mulvey	136	8.7	−1.4
Majority		629	40.1	
Turnout		1,569	20.7	
Liberal Democrats hold		Swing		

The by-election was called following the resignation of Cllr Ian Powney.

Hillrise by-election, 26 June 2003
Party	Candidate	Votes	%	±%
Liberal Democrats	Fiona Dunlop	983	47.4	−2.4
Labour	Alan M. Clinton	789	38.1	−1.2
Green	Michael H. W. Holloway	239	11.5	+0.6
Conservative	John A. Wilkin	62	3.0	+3.0
Majority		194	9.4	
Turnout		2,073	26.1	
Liberal Democrats hold		Swing		

The by-election was called following the resignation of Cllr Paul Fox.

Hillrise by-election, 30 October 2003
Party	Candidate	Votes	%	±%
Liberal Democrats	Jayashankar Sharma	795	48.7	−1.1
Labour	Janet D. Burgess	595	36.5	−2.8
Green	Robin W. Latimer	177	10.9	+0.0
Conservative	John A. Wilkin	64	4.0	+4.0
Majority		200	12.3	
Turnout		1.631	20.4	
Liberal Democrats hold		Swing		

The by-election was called following the resignation of Cllr Sarah Teather.

Highbury West by-election, 5 May 2005
Party	Candidate	Votes	%	±%
Labour	Theresa Debono	1,669	39.2	−9.1
Green	Jon Nott	1,043	24.5	−8.3
Liberal Democrats	Iarla Kilbane-Dawe	711	16.7	+3.8
Local Freedom for Islington Residents	Tim Newark	437	10.3	+10.3
Conservative	Simon Phillips	394	9.3	+3.2
Majority		626	14.7	
Turnout		4,254		
Labour hold		Swing		

The by-election was called following the resignation of Cllr Mary Creagh.

=== 2006-2010 ===
There were no by-elections.

=== 2010-2014 ===
St Peter's by-election, 11 August 2011
Party	Candidate	Votes	%	±%
Labour	Alice Perry	1,167	52.5	+17.5
Liberal Democrats	David Sant	440	19.8	−9.6
Conservative	Richard Bunting	381	17.1	−9.1
Green	Caroline Allen	176	7.9	−1.4
Independent	Martin Rutherford	59	2.7	+2.7
Majority		727	32.7	
Turnout		2,223	24.8	−39.2
Labour hold		Swing	13.55	

The by-election was called following the resignation of Cllr Michelle Coupland.

St Mary's by-election, 10 November 2011
Party	Candidate	Votes	%	±%
Labour	Gary Poole	1,128	47.1	+10.8
Liberal Democrats	Emily Fieran-Reed	641	26.7	−7.0
Green	Caroline Russell	317	13.2	+0.1
Conservative	Oriel Hutchinson	282	11.8	−10.3
BNP	Walter Barfoot	22	0.9	+0.9
Majority		487	20.3	
Turnout		2,397	23.64	
Labour hold		Swing	9.6%	

The by-election was called following the disqualification of Cllr Joan Coupland.

Holloway by-election, 3 May 2012
Party	Candidate	Votes	%	±%
Labour	Rakhia Ismail	2,352	57.0	+12.0
Conservative	Jonathan Edwards	671	16.3	+2.0
Green	Claire Poyner	613	14.8	+2.0
Liberal Democrats	David Kelly	490	11.8	−16.2
Majority		1,681		
Turnout		4,126		
Labour hold		Swing		

The by-election was called following the resignation of Cllr Lucy Rigby.

Junction by-election, 21 March 2013
Party	Candidate	Votes	%	±%
Labour	Kaya Makarau-Schwartz	1,343	61.60	+21.5
Green	Mick Holloway	381	17.47	+5.2
Liberal Democrats	Stefan Kasprzyk	276	12.66	−25.0
Conservative	Patricia Napier	120	5.50	−4.1
BNP	Gary Townsend	31	1.42	+1.42
Socialist (GB)	Bill Martin	18	0.82	+0.82
Majority		962	44.12	
Turnout		2,180	24.20	
Labour gain from Liberal Democrats		Swing		

The by-election was called following the resignation of Cllr Arthur Graves.

St George's by-election, 21 March 2013
Party	Candidate	Votes	%	±%
Labour	Kat Fletcher	1,698	71.01	+38.5
Liberal Democrats	Julian Gregory	371	15.51	−25.0
Green	Jon Nott	206	8.61	−5.5
Conservative	Evan Williams	87	3.63	−6.0
BNP	Walter Barfoot	20	0.83	+0.83
Majority		1,327	55.49	
Turnout		2,391	25.88	
Labour hold		Swing		

The by-election was called following the resignation of Cllr Jessica Asato.

=== 2014-2018 ===
Barnsbury by-election, 14 July 2016
Party	Candidate	Votes	%	±%
Labour	Rowena Champion	1,192	51.6	−4.1
Liberal Democrats	Bradley Hillier-Smith	409	17.7	+7.1
Conservative	Edward Waldegrave	367	15.0	−2.9
Green	Ernestas Jegorovas	302	13.1	+0.7
Independent	Robert Capper	40	1.7	N/A
Majority		783	33.9	
Turnout		2,316	25.43	
Labour hold		Swing	13.55	

The by-election was called following the resignation of Cllr James Murray.

=== 2018-2022 ===
St George's by-election, 12 December 2019
Party	Candidate	Votes	%	±%
Labour	Gulcin Ozdemir	2,918	45.4	−7.5
Green	Natasha Cox	2,501	38.9	+3.0
Liberal Democrats	Helen Redesdale	738	11.5	+5.5
Women's Equality	Guilene Marco	268	4.2	+4.2
Majority		417	6.5	
Turnout		6,425		
Labour hold		Swing		

The by-election was called following the resignation of Cllr Kat Fletcher.

Bunhill by-election, 6 May 2021
Party	Candidate	Votes	%	±%
Labour	Valerie Bossman-Quarshie	1,960	48.4	−4.7
Conservative	Zak Vora	744	18.4	+3.9
Green	Catherine Webb	590	14.6	+1.9
Liberal Democrats	Maxx Turing	572	14.1	+2.0
Independent	Martyn Perks	181	4.5	+4.5
Majority		1,216	30.0	
Turnout		4,047		
Labour hold		Swing		

The by-election was called following the resignation of Cllr Claudia Webbe MP.

Highbury West by-election, 6 May 2021
Party	Candidate	Votes	%	±%
Labour	Bashir Ibrahim	2,465	42.4	−12.0
Green	Katie Dawson	1,799	30.9	+12.1
Liberal Democrats	Terry Stacy	776	13.3	+2.2
Conservative	Ben Jackson	773	13.3	+5.6
Majority		666	11.5	
Turnout		5,813		
Labour hold		Swing		

The by-election was called following the resignation of Cllr Andy Hull.

Holloway by-election, 6 May 2021
Party	Candidate	Votes	%	±%
Labour	Jason Jackson	2,852	58.1	−7.4
Green	Claire Poyner	792	16.1	+3.1
Conservative	Harry Nugent	720	14.7	+4.9
Liberal Democrats	Andrew Hyett	548	11.2	−0.5
Majority		2,060	41.9	
Turnout		4,912		
Labour hold		Swing		

The by-election was called following the resignation of Cllr Paul Smith.

Mildmay by-election, 6 May 2021
Party	Candidate	Votes	%	±%
Labour	Angelo Weekes	2,307	55.7	−9.5
Green	Zoe Alzamora	883	21.3	+6.0
Conservative	William Woodroofe	603	14.6	+6.5
Liberal Democrats	Phil Stevens	349	8.4	−2.9
Majority		1,424	34.4	
Turnout		4,142		
Labour hold		Swing		

The by-election was called following the resignation of Cllr Joe Caluori.

St Peter's by-election, 6 May 2021
Party	Candidate	Votes	%	±%
Labour	Toby North	1,885	42.9	−10.9
Liberal Democrats	Victoria Collins	876	19.9	+2.7
Conservative	Muhammad Kalaam	749	17.0	+0.0
Green	Veronica Pasteur	567	12.9	+0.9
Independent	Jody Graber	318	7.2	+7.2
Majority		1,009	23.0	
Turnout		4,395		
Labour hold		Swing		

The by-election was called following the resignation of Cllr Vivien Cutler.

Tollington by-election, 1 July 2021
Party	Candidate	Votes	%	±%
Labour	Mick Gilgunn	1,243	56.7	−12.7
Green	Jonathan Ward	730	33.3	+16.4
Conservative	Vanessa Carson	127	5.8	+0.4
Liberal Democrats	Jane Nicolov	94	4.3	−3.9
Majority		513	23.4	
Turnout		2,194		
Labour hold		Swing		

The by-election was called following the resignation of Cllr Richard Watts.

=== 2022-2026 ===
Hillrise by-election, 2 May 2024
Party	Candidate	Votes	%	±%
Labour	Ollie Steadman	2,824	62.8	+0.4
Green	Alex Nettle	1,095	24.4	+3.0
Liberal Democrats	Rebecca Taylor	577	12.8	+3.0
Majority		1,729	38.5	
Turnout		4,496		
Labour hold		Swing		

The by-election was called following the resignation of Cllr Dave Poyser.

Hillrise by-election, 15 August 2024
Party	Candidate	Votes	%	±%
Labour	Shreya Nanda	968	43.3	−19.5
Independent	Alison Stoecker	539	24.1	+24.1
Liberal Democrats	Imogen Wall	350	15.7	+2.9
Green	Alex Nettle	322	14.4	−10.0
Independent	Maxim Parr-Reid	54	2.4	+2.4
Majority		429	19.2	
Turnout		2,233		
Labour hold		Swing		

The by-election was called following the resignation of Cllr Ollie Steadman.

Junction by-election, 28 November 2024
Party	Candidate	Votes	%	±%
Labour	James Potts	785	40.4	−21.9
Independent	Jackson Caines	550	28.3	+28.3
Green	Devon Osborne	219	11.3	−11.1
Liberal Democrats	Rebecca Jones	156	8.0	+0.9
Conservative	John Wilkin	113	5.8	−2.4
Independent	Brian Potter	97	5.0	+5.0
Socialist (GB)	Bill Martin	22	1.1	+1.1
Majority		235	12.1	
Turnout		1,942		
Labour hold		Swing		

The by-election was called following the resignation of Cllr Kaya Comer-Schwartz.
