= 2024 United Kingdom electoral calendar =

This is a list of elections in the United Kingdom scheduled to be held in 2024. Included are local elections, by-elections on any level, referendums and internal party elections.

== Dates ==
=== February ===
- 15 February – 2024 Wellingborough by-election and 2024 Kingswood by-election
- 29 February – 2024 Rochdale by-election

=== March ===
- 21 March – Yaxley and Farcet ward on Cambridgeshire County Council

=== 2 May – 2024 United Kingdom local elections ===
- 2024 London Assembly election
- 2024 England and Wales police and crime commissioner elections
- 2024 Blackpool South by-election

Council by-elections

48 Council by-elections were also held on 2 May 2024 in authorities otherwise without elections scheduled:

- Bournbrook and Selly Park ward for Birmingham
- Canford Cliffs ward for Bournemouth, Christchurch and Poole Council
- Kemptown and Queen's Park wards for Brighton & Hove
- Hackney – De Beauvoir; and Hoxton East and Shoreditch
- Knight's Hill and Streatham Common and Vale for Lambeth London Borough Council
- Deptford ward for Lewisham London Borough Council
- Chilton ward for Mid Suffolk District Council
- Bunwell ward for South Norfolk District Council
- Meir North ward for Stoke-on-Trent City Council
- Evesham North West division for Worcestershire County Council

==== Council by-elections ====
- 9 May – Kilwinning on North Ayrshire Council. Scottish Labour candidate Mary Hume gained the seat from the Scottish Conservatives.

=== June ===
- 6 June – Wellswood ward on Torbay Council.

=== July ===
- 4 July – The 2024 United Kingdom general election was held.
  - Council by-election in Madeley and Betley ward to elect two new councillors on Newcastle-under-Lyme Borough Council.
- 20 July – July 2024 Welsh Labour leadership election

=== August ===
- 15 August – Three council by-elections:
  - Islington London Borough Council – Shreya Nanda held the seat for Labour in Hillrise ward.
  - Caerphilly County Borough Council – Chris Bissex-Foster held the seat for Labour in Aberbargoed and Bargoed ward, by just one vote over the Plaid Cymru candidate.
  - Stirling Council – David Wilson held the seat for Labour in Dunblane and Bridge of Allan ward.

=== September ===
- 2024 Conservative Party leadership election
- 2024 Scottish Conservatives leadership election

=== October ===
- 2024 Montserratian general election.
- 2024 University of Oxford Chancellor election

== See also ==
- 2024 in the United Kingdom

== See also ==
- 2023 United Kingdom electoral calendar
- 2022 United Kingdom electoral calendar
