= Barnsbury (ward) =

Electoral ward in Greater London, England

- Electoral ward for the Islington London Borough Council
- Barnsbury ward boundaries since 2022
- Borough: Islington
- County: Greater London
- Population: 11,709 (2021) (Note: 2021 Census data reported for 2022 ward boundaries)
- Electorate: 8,463 (2022)
- Major settlements: Barnsbury
- Area: 0.8155 square kilometres (0.3149 sq mi)

Current electoral ward
- Created: 1965
- Councillors: 3
- GSS code: E05013698 (2022–present)

Barnsbury is an electoral ward in the London Borough of Islington. The ward has existed since the creation of the borough on 1 April 1965 and was first used in the 1964 elections. It returns three councillors to Islington London Borough Council.

== Islington council elections since 2022 ==
There was a revision of ward boundaries in Islington in 2022.

=== 2022 election ===
The election took place on 5 May 2022.

2022 Islington London Borough Council election: Barnsbury
Party	Candidate	Votes	%	±%
Labour	Rowena Champion	1,754	57.3	
Labour	Jilani Chowdhury	1,565	51.1	
Labour	Praful Nargund	1,425	46.6	
Green	Carmela Bromhead Jones	772	25.2	
Conservative	Vanessa Margaret Carson	560	18.3	
Conservative	Peter McMahon	505	16.5	
Conservative	Tam Kocak-Bass	498	16.3	
Liberal Democrats	Jeremy Arthur Hargreaves	454	14.8	
Green	John Ashton Hartley	440	14.4	
Liberal Democrats	Michael Benedict Champness	438	14.3	
Green	Jake Gerard Williams	412	13.5	
Liberal Democrats	Erwann Patrick Michel Le Lannou	360	11.8	
Turnout			37.1	
Labour win (new boundaries)				
Labour win (new boundaries)				
Labour win (new boundaries)				

== 2002–2022 Islington council elections ==
Barnsbury ward boundaries from 2002 to 2022

There was a revision of ward boundaries in Islington in 2002.

=== 2018 election ===
The election took place on 3 May 2018.

2018 Islington London Borough Council election: Barnsbury
Party	Candidate	Votes	%	±%
Labour	Rowena Champion	1,820	56.6	
Labour	Jilani Chowdhury	1,661	51.6	
Labour	Mouna Hamitouche	1,661	51.6	
Conservative	Edward Waldegrave	622	19.3	
Conservative	Imogen Atkinson	611	19.0	
Liberal Democrats	Natasha Broke	595	18.5	
Conservative	Peng Kiong Chou	555	17.3	
Green	Carmela Bromhead Jones	455	14.1	
Liberal Democrats	Brian Tjugum	447	13.9	
Liberal Democrats	Imogen Wall	406	12.6	
Green	Jill Renwick	295	9.2	
Green	Roger Kitsis	287	8.9	
Turnout				
Labour hold		Swing		
Labour hold		Swing		
Labour hold		Swing		

=== 2016 by-election ===
The by-election took place on 14 July 2016, following the resignation of James Murray.

2016 Barnsbury by-election
Party	Candidate	Votes	%	±%
Labour	Rowena Champion	1,192	51.6	−4.1
Liberal Democrats	Bradley Hillier-Smith	409	17.7	+7.1
Conservative	Edward Waldegrave	367	15.0	−2.9
Green	Ernestas Jegorovas	302	13.1	+0.7
Independent	Robert Capper	40	1.7	N/A
Majority		783	33.9	
Turnout		2,316	25.43	
Labour hold		Swing	13.55	

=== 2014 election ===
The election took place on 22 May 2014.

2014 Islington London Borough Council election: Barnsbury
Party	Candidate	Votes	%	±%
Labour	James Murray	2,110		
Labour	Jilani Chowdhury	1,948		
Labour	Mouna Hamitouche	1,910		
Conservative	Stuart Cullen	710		
Conservative	Joseph Eldridge	604		
Conservative	Alicia Ramona Simms	594		
Green	Harry Hicks	467		
Green	Rosie Magudia	447		
Liberal Democrats	David John Christmas	400		
Green	Matthew Parsons	327		
Liberal Democrats	Kristina Lewis	309		
Liberal Democrats	Laura Willoughby	286		
TUSC	Lesley Woodburn	100		
Turnout		3,614	39.8	−21.8
Labour hold		Swing		
Labour hold		Swing		
Labour hold		Swing		

=== 2010 election ===
The election on 6 May 2010 took place on the same day as the United Kingdom general election.

2010 Islington London Borough Council election: Barnsbury
Party	Candidate	Votes	%	±%
Labour	James Murray	2,399		
Labour	Jilani Chowdhury	2,165		
Labour	Mouna Hamitouche	2,064		
Liberal Democrats	Oliver Strong	1,460		
Liberal Democrats	Mark Davies	1,358		
Liberal Democrats	Shamima Begum	1,221		
Conservative	Flora Coleman	1,204		
Conservative	David Tucker	1,198		
Conservative	Duncan Webster	1,111		
Green	Sheena Etches	557		
Green	Claire Shepherd	528		
Green	Harry Hicks	490		
Independent	Ed Fredenburgh	87		
Turnout		15,842	64.3	+28.4
Labour hold		Swing		
Labour hold		Swing		
Labour hold		Swing		

=== 2006 election ===
The election took place on 4 May 2006.

2006 Islington London Borough Council election: Barnsbury
Party	Candidate	Votes	%	±%
Labour	James Murray	1,072	37.8	
Labour	Jilani Chowdhury	986		
Labour	Mouna Hamitouche	973		
Liberal Democrats	Bridget Fox	888	31.3	
Liberal Democrats	Emma Gowers	789		
Liberal Democrats	Linda Middleton	744		
Conservative	Martin Koder	445	15.7	
Conservative	Katherine Bereza	437		
Green	Nicola Baird	432	15.2	
Conservative	Lloyd Sampson	426		
Green	Elaine Londesborough	394		
Green	Jan Hallett	391		
Turnout		7,977	35.9	+7.9
Labour gain from Liberal Democrats		Swing		
Labour gain from Liberal Democrats		Swing		
Labour gain from Liberal Democrats		Swing		

=== 2003 by-election ===
The by-election took place on 26 June 2003, following the resignation of Ian Powney.

2003 Barnsbury by-election
Party	Candidate	Votes	%	±%
Liberal Democrats	Emma Gowers	940	59.9	+11.9
Labour	Joseph Simpson	311	19.8	−5.8
Conservative	Nicholas Millwood	182	11.6	+3.8
Green	Ben Mulvey	136	8.7	−1.4
Majority		629	40.1	
Turnout		1,569	20.7	
Liberal Democrats hold		Swing		

=== 2002 election ===
The election took place on 2 May 2002.

2002 Islington London Borough Council election: Barnsbury
Party	Candidate	Votes	%	±%
Liberal Democrats	Bridget Fox	1,127		
Liberal Democrats	Sylvia Wright	1,046		
Liberal Democrats	Ian Powney	1,036		
Labour	Jan Pitt	600		
Labour	Emily Thornberry	600		
Labour	Maureen Leigh	561		
Green	Ben Mulvey	238		
Green	Sarah Green	227		
Independent	Anthony Sellen	199		
Conservative	Jacqueline Fage	183		
Conservative	Michael Coney	174		
Conservative	Adam Bogdanor	153		
Turnout		6,144	28.0	
Liberal Democrats win (new boundaries)				
Liberal Democrats win (new boundaries)				
Liberal Democrats win (new boundaries)				

== 1978–2002 Islington council elections ==
Barnsbury ward boundaries from 1978 to 2002

There was a revision of ward boundaries in Islington in 1978.

=== 1998 election ===
The election took place on 7 May 1998.

1998 Islington London Borough Council election: Barnsbury
Party	Candidate	Votes	%	±%
Liberal Democrats	Bridget Fox	1,725		
Liberal Democrats	Alastair Loraine	1,623		
Liberal Democrats	Carol Powell	1,575		
Labour	Paula Kahn	929		
Labour	Steven Barnett	914		
Labour	Lloyd Child	897		
Green	Robert Pearce	211		
Conservative	Christopher Cox	174		
Tenants & Residents	John Worker	131		
Conservative	Martin Moyes	111		
Conservative	Jonathan Small	96		
Turnout		8,386		
Liberal Democrats gain from Labour		Swing		
Liberal Democrats gain from Labour		Swing		
Liberal Democrats gain from Labour		Swing		

=== 1994 election ===
The election took place on 5 May 1994.

1994 Islington London Borough Council election: Barnsbury
Party	Candidate	Votes	%
Labour	Winston Winston	1,556	57.5
Labour	Louisa Mallard	1,555	
Labour	Mark Stacey	1,487	
Liberal Democrats	Katherine Hall	669	24.1
Liberal Democrats	Isobel Cox	638	
Liberal Democrats	Jonathan Wright	617	
Conservative	Aidan Langley	505	18.4
Conservative	Charles Hoare	494	
Conservative	Martin Moyes	472	
Registered electors		6,507	
Turnout		2,869	44.09
Rejected ballots		14	0.49
Labour hold			
Labour hold			
Labour hold			

=== 1990 election ===
The election took place on 3 May 1990.

1990 Islington London Borough Council election: Barnsbury
Party	Candidate	Votes	%
Labour	Joan Herbert	1,537	44.30
Labour	Gordon Johnston	1,508	
Labour	Valda James	1,488	
SDP	Ann Brennan	793	20.76
SDP	George Lambillion	744	
SDP	Sylvia Smart	587	
Green	Annie Chipchase	496	14.54
Conservative	Alexandra Eldridge	469	12.63
Conservative	Martin Moyes	419	
Conservative	Irene Moore	404	
Tenants and Residents	Christine Rodgers	265	7.77
Registered electors		6,445	
Turnout		3,152	48.91
Rejected ballots		3	0.10
Labour gain from Liberal Democrats			
Labour gain from Liberal Democrats			
Labour gain from Liberal Democrats			

=== 1986 election ===
The election took place on 8 May 1986.

1986 Islington London Borough Council election: Barnsbury
Party	Candidate	Votes	%
Alliance	George Lambillion	1,659	
Alliance	Ann Brennan	1,507	
Alliance	Christopher Mularczyk	1,498	
Labour	Alexander Farrell	1,291	
Labour	Derek Hines	1,264	
Labour	John Worker	1,178	
Conservative	Reginald Brown	260	
Conservative	Neil Kerr	240	
Green	Caroline Clayton	212	
Conservative	Mark Rittner	204	
Communist	John Jones	138	
Registered electors		6,484	
Turnout			52.5
Alliance hold			
Alliance gain from Labour			
Alliance gain from Labour			

=== 1983 by-election ===
The by-election took place on 27 October 1983, following the resignation of Chris Smith.

1983 Barnsbury by-election
Party	Candidate	Votes	%	±%
Alliance	George Lambillion	1,439		
Labour	Christopher Adamson	1,116		
Conservative	Robin Hay	217		
Turnout				
Alliance gain from Labour		Swing		

=== 1982 election ===
The election took place on 6 May 1982.

1982 Islington London Borough Council election: Barnsbury
Party	Candidate	Votes	%
Labour	Alexander Farrell	1,637	56.2
Labour	Chris Smith	1,630	
Labour	Margaret Hodge	1,618	
Alliance	James Lawrie	733	25.1
Alliance	Anna Beaumont	701	
Alliance	Antony Martin	682	
Conservative	John Gallagher	544	18.7
Conservative	Simon Melhuish-Hancock	476	
Conservative	David Wedgwood	462	
Registered electors		6,745	
Turnout			45.5
Labour hold			
Labour hold			
Labour hold			

=== 1978 election ===
The election took place on 4 May 1978.

1978 Islington London Borough Council election: Barnsbury
Party	Candidate	Votes	%
Labour	Christopher Smith	1,257	
Labour	Cecilia McAskill	1,235	
Labour	Alexander Farrell	1,221	
Conservative	John Gallagher	923	
Conservative	Gillian Gallagher	915	
Conservative	George Skelly	882	
National Front	Lawrence O'Brien	171	
National Front	Arthur Jupp	164	
National Front	Frederick Atkin	163	
Liberal	John Hamilton	132	
Liberal	David Trillo	115	
Communist	Maria Loftus	107	
Registered electors		6,355	
Turnout			42.2
Labour win (new boundaries)			
Labour win (new boundaries)			
Labour win (new boundaries)			

== 1964–1978 Islington council elections ==
=== 1974 election ===
The election took place on 2 May 1974.

1974 Islington London Borough Council election: Barnsbury
Party	Candidate	Votes	%
Labour	M. Watson	836	
Labour	M. McAskill	830	
Labour	M. Conway	822	
Conservative	J. Field	421	
Conservative	L. McAfee	387	
Conservative	D. Taylor	386	
Liberal	M. Pears	327	
Liberal	M Oilard	305	
Liberal	H. Smith	266	
Communist	P. Sentinella	90	
Registered electors		5,322	
Turnout			31.6
Labour hold			
Labour hold			
Labour hold			

=== 1973 by-election ===
The by-election took place on 12 April 1973.

1973 Barnsbury by-election
Party	Candidate	Votes	%	±%
Labour	M. Reynolds	1,097		
Labour	M. Watson	1,064		
Conservative	J. Rush	374		
Conservative	J. Szemerey	350		
Official Liberal	A. Capel	216		
Official Liberal	E. Jacomb	203		
New Liberal	Alan Lomas	52		
New Liberal	R. Girolami	36		
Turnout			33.1	
Labour hold				
Labour hold				

=== 1971 election ===
The election took place on 13 May 1971.

Barnsbury
Party	Candidate	Votes	%
Labour	P. Milsom	1,620	
Labour	R. Madeley	1,580	
Labour	R. Wylie	1,570	
Conservative	A. Rose	600	
Conservative	C. Alexander	599	
Conservative	S. Dykes	587	
Communist	J. Jones	124	
Dwarf	L. Arnold	61	
Registered electors		6,220	
Turnout			38.7
Labour gain from Independent			
Labour gain from Independent			
Labour gain from Independent			

=== 1968 election ===
The election took place on 9 May 1968.

1968 Islington London Borough Council election: Barnsbury
Party	Candidate	Votes	%
Independent	B. Thompson	810	
Independent	T. Blyth	807	
Independent	M. Reynolds	805	
Labour	M. O'Donoghue	690	
Labour	D. Turner	575	
Labour	E. Ward	566	
Communist	J. Jones	124	
Islington Tenants & Ratepayers	J. Burgess	76	
Islington Tenants & Ratepayers	H. Twigg	62	
Islington Tenants & Ratepayers	D. Tidy	61	
Registered electors		7,013	
Turnout			23.5
Independent gain from Labour			
Independent gain from Labour			
Independent gain from Labour			

=== 1964 election ===
The election took place on 7 May 1964.

1964 Islington London Borough Council election: Barnsbury
Party	Candidate	Votes	%
Labour	M. O'Donoghue	1,155	
Labour	E. Brown	1,068	
Labour	C. Goddard	1,058	
Conservative	P. Postgate	191	
Conservative	G. Luttridge	183	
Conservative	F. Luttridge	174	
Communist	J. Jones	128	
Registered electors		8,081	
Turnout		1,428	17.7
Labour win (new seat)			
Labour win (new seat)			
Labour win (new seat)			
