= Junction (ward) =

Electoral ward in Islington, London, England

- Electoral ward for the Islington London Borough Council
- Junction ward boundaries since 2022
- Borough: Islington
- County: Greater London
- Population: 12,855 (2021) (Note: 2021 Census data reported for 2022 ward boundaries)
- Electorate: 8,979 (2022)
- Major settlements: Archway
- Area: 1.049 square kilometres (0.405 sq mi)

Current electoral ward
- Created: 1965
- Number of members: 1965–1978: 4; 1978–present: 3
- Councillors: Janet Burgess; Sheila Chapman; James Potts
- ONS code: 00AUGH (2002–2022)
- GSS code: E05013707 (2022–present); E05000376 (2002–2022)

Junction is an electoral ward in the London Borough of Islington. The ward has existed since the creation of the borough on 1 April 1965 and was first used in the 1964 elections. It returns councillors to Islington London Borough Council. The boundaries were redrawn in 1978, 2002 and 2022. The revision in 1978 reduced the number of councillors from four to three.

== List of councillors ==
The ward was initially represented by four councillors. This decreased to three in 1978.

Term	Councillor	Party
1964–1968	P. Grant	Labour
1964–1968	E. Plummer	Labour
1964–1968	L. Ross	Labour
1964–1968	C. Tarr	Labour
1968–1971	C. Bircher	Conservative
1968–1971	S. Bron	Conservative
1968–1971	R. Kinghorn	Conservative
1968–1971	J. Szemerey	Conservative
1971–1974	W. Musgrave	Labour
1971–1974	David Davies	Labour
1971–1972	George Barnard	Labour
1971–1974	D. Robinson	Labour
1972–1974	M. McCann	Labour
1974–1978	K. Donoghue	Labour
1974–1978	H. Metcalf	Labour
1974–1982	Mark Van de Weyer	Labour
1974–1978	V. Veness	Labour
1982–1990	Maurice Barnes	Labour
1982–2002	Taha Karim	Labour
1982–1986	Derek Sawyer	Labour
1986–1992	Candy Atherton	Labour
1990–1994	Robert Durack	Labour
1992–1994	Lydia Richards	Labour
1994–2001	Sandra Marks	Labour
1994–1997	Tal Michael	Labour
1998–2002	Janet Burgess	Labour
2006–present	Janet Burgess	Labour
2001–2002	Patricia Clarke	Labour
2002–2006	James Blanchard	Liberal Democrats
2002–2010	Stefan Kasprzyk	Liberal Democrats
2002–2006	Euan Cameron	Liberal Democrats
2006–2014	Ursula Woolley	Liberal Democrats
2010–2013	Arthur Graves	Liberal Democrats
2013–2024	Kaya Comer-Schwartz	Labour
2014–2018	Tim Nicholls	Labour
2018–present	Sheila Chapman	Labour
2024–present	James Potts	Labour

== Summary ==
Councillors elected by party at each general borough election.

- Labour
- Conservative
- Liberal Democrats

== Islington council elections since 2022 ==
There was a revision of ward boundaries in Islington in 2022. Junction ward gained the Miranda Estate from Hillrise.

=== 2024 by-election ===
The by-election took place on 28 November 2024, following the resignation of Kaya Comer-Schwartz.

2024 Junction by-election
Party	Candidate	Votes	%	±%
Labour	James Potts	785		
Independent	Jackson Caines	550		
Green	Devon Osborne	219		
Liberal Democrats	Rebecca Jones	156		
Conservative	John Wilkin	113		
Independent	Brian Potter	97		
Socialist (GB)	Bill Martin	22		
Turnout				
Labour hold		Swing		

=== 2022 election ===
The election took place on 5 May 2022.

2022 Islington London Borough Council election: Junction (3)
Party	Candidate	Votes	%	±%
Labour	Janet Burgess	2,111	68.0	
Labour	Kaya Comer-Schwartz	2,004	64.5	
Labour	Sheila Chapman	2,001	64.4	
Green	Olivia Brunning	761	24.5	
Green	Paul Elliott	545	17.6	
Green	David Zell	507	16.3	
Conservative	Kim Andrews	279	9.0	
Conservative	Jonathan Elvin	252	8.1	
Liberal Democrats	Stefan Kasprzyk	240	7.7	
Conservative	Nigel Seay	240	7.7	
Liberal Democrats	Jonathan Taylor	194	6.2	
Liberal Democrats	Ufi Ibrahim	182	5.9	
Turnout			35.3	
Labour win (new boundaries)				
Labour win (new boundaries)				
Labour win (new boundaries)				

== 2002–2022 Islington council elections ==
Junction ward boundaries from 2002 to 2022

There was a revision of ward boundaries in Islington in 2002.

=== 2018 election ===
The election took place on 3 May 2018.

2018 Islington London Borough Council election: Junction (3)
Party	Candidate	Votes	%	±%
Labour	Janet Burgess	2,391	71.0	
Labour	Sheila Chapman	2,236	66.4	
Labour	Kaya Comer-Schwartz	2,192	65.1	
Green	Olivia Brunning	621	18.4	
Green	Paul Elliott	389	11.6	
Liberal Democrats	Stefan Kasprzyk	331	9.8	
Green	Eric Fabrizi	326	9.7	
Liberal Democrats	Kath Pollard	289	8.6	
Conservative	John Wilkin	280	8.3	
Liberal Democrats	Amy Vatcher	271	8.0	
Conservative	Toan Hoang	262	7.8	
Conservative	Chinwe Bunting	256	7.6	
Socialist (GB)	Bill Martin	52	1.5	
Turnout				
Labour hold		Swing		
Labour hold		Swing		
Labour hold		Swing		

=== 2014 election ===
The election took place on 22 May 2014.

2014 Islington London Borough Council election: Junction (3)
Party	Candidate	Votes	%	±%
Labour	Janet Burgess	2,228		
Labour	Kaya Makarau-Schwartz	1,938		
Labour	Tim Nicholls	1,779		
Green	Jill Renwick	720		
Green	Mick Holloway	717		
Green	Daniel Hudson	621		
Conservative	Michael Collins	361		
Liberal Democrats	Stefan Kasprzyk	333		
Conservative	Riddhi Bhalla	320		
Conservative	Oliver Jonathan	314		
Liberal Democrats	Giorgia Gamba	297		
Liberal Democrats	Victoria Savvides	245		
Independent	Bill Martin	90		
Turnout		3,498	38.4	−25.5
Labour hold		Swing		
Labour gain from Liberal Democrats		Swing		
Labour gain from Liberal Democrats		Swing		

=== 2013 by-election ===
A by-election was held on 21 March 2013, following the resignation of Arthur Graves.

2013 Junction by-election
Party	Candidate	Votes	%	±%
Labour	Kaya Makarau-Schwartz	1,343	61.60	+21.5
Green	Mick Holloway	381	17.47	+5.2
Liberal Democrats	Stefan Kasprzyk	276	12.66	−25.0
Conservative	Patricia Napier	120	5.50	−4.1
BNP	Gary Townsend	31	1.42	+1.42
Socialist (GB)	Bill Martin	18	0.82	+0.82
Majority		962	44.12	
Turnout		2,180	24.20	
Labour gain from Liberal Democrats		Swing		

=== 2010 election ===
The election on 6 May 2010 took place on the same day as the United Kingdom general election.

2010 Islington London Borough Council election: Junction (3)
Party	Candidate	Votes	%	±%
Labour	Janet Burgess	2,338		
Liberal Democrats	Arthur Graves	2,182		
Liberal Democrats	Ursula Woolley	2,125		
Liberal Democrats	Stefan Kasprzyk	2,071		
Labour	Olly Parker	1,899		
Labour	Kaya Makarau-Schwartz	1,878		
Green	Sue Bineham	713		
Green	Becky Wright	597		
Conservative	Connor Coleman	556		
Conservative	Richard Campbell	533		
Green	Ken Burgess	529		
Conservative	James Kerby	480		
Turnout		15,901	63.9	+28.5
Labour hold		Swing		
Liberal Democrats hold		Swing		
Liberal Democrats hold		Swing		

=== 2006 election ===
The election took place on 4 May 2006.

2006 Islington London Borough Council election: Junction (3)
Party	Candidate	Votes	%	±%
Liberal Democrats	Ursula Woolley	1,015	35.9	
Liberal Democrats	Stefan Kasprzyk	1,014		
Labour	Janet Burgess	936	33.1	
Liberal Democrats	Zubin Masani	873		
Labour	Patricia Clarke	870		
Labour	John Wyman	772		
Green	Rosemary House	386	13.6	
Green	Donald Lowe	320		
Green	Anthony Cooper	291		
Independent	Katharine Buffery	263	9.3	
Conservative	Mark Bennett	228	8.1	
Independent	Charles Ware	212		
Conservative	Francine Schwartz	200		
Conservative	Chris Skidmore	188		
Turnout		7,568	35.4	+4.8
Liberal Democrats hold		Swing		
Liberal Democrats hold		Swing		
Labour gain from Liberal Democrats		Swing		

=== 2002 election ===
The election took place on 2 May 2002.

2002 Islington London Borough Council election: Junction (3)
Party	Candidate	Votes	%	±%
Liberal Democrats	James Blanchard	1,219		
Liberal Democrats	Stefan Kasprzyk	1,137		
Liberal Democrats	Euan Cameron	1,132		
Labour	Janet Burgess	1,035		
Labour	Patricia Clarke	925		
Labour	Talal Karim	864		
Green	Tania Stokes	261		
Green	Keith Magnum	207		
Green	Beatrice Sayers	204		
CPA	Pearl Grenardo	31		
Turnout		7,015	30.6	
Liberal Democrats win (new boundaries)				
Liberal Democrats win (new boundaries)				
Liberal Democrats win (new boundaries)				

== 1978–2002 Islington council elections ==
Junction ward boundaries from 1978 to 2002

There was a revision of ward boundaries in Islington in 1978.

=== 2001 by-election ===
The by-election was held on 7 June 2001, following the resignation of Sandra Marks.

2001 Junction by-election
Party	Candidate	Votes	%	±%
Labour	Patricia Clarke	1,661	47.1	−8.2
Liberal Democrats	Stefan Kaprzyk	1,253	35.5	+15.2
Green	Jon Nott	347	9.8	−5.6
Conservative	Abubaker Ajiya	266	7.5	−1.4
Majority		408	11.6	
Turnout		3,527	49.9	
Labour hold		Swing		

=== 1998 election ===
The election took place on 7 May 1998.

1998 Islington London Borough Council election: Junction (3)
Party	Candidate	Votes	%	±%
Labour	Janet Burgess	1,104		
Labour	Taha Karim	940		
Labour	Sandra Marks	934		
Liberal Democrats	Margaret Lally	430		
Liberal Democrats	Elizabeth Sidney	347		
Liberal Democrats	Alford Reeves	319		
Green	Angela Royston	284		
Green	Ajay Burlingham-Johnson	271		
Conservative	Charles Sharman	167		
Conservative	Anthea Ward	152		
Turnout		4,948		
Labour hold		Swing		
Labour hold		Swing		
Labour hold		Swing		

=== 1997 by-election ===
The by-election took place on 10 July 1997, following the resignation of Tal Michael.

1997 Junction by-election
Party	Candidate	Votes	%	±%
Labour	Janet Burgess	793	72.6	+10.9
Conservative	Oliver Judge	134	12.3	+1.9
Liberal Democrats	Heija Jaff	90	8.2	−7.2
Green	Victoria Olliver	76	7.0	−5.7
Majority		659	60.3	
Turnout		1,093	17.0	
Labour hold		Swing		

=== 1994 election ===
The election took place on 5 May 1994.

1994 Islington London Borough Council election: Junction (3)
Party	Candidate	Votes	%	±%
Labour	Sandra Marks	1,656	62.34	▲3.54
Labour	Taha Karim	1,630		
Labour	Tal Michael	1,497		
Liberal Democrats	Jane Little	415	13.96	New
Liberal Democrats	Pauline Callow	355		
Green	Angela Royston	338	13.22	▼10.30
Liberal Democrats	Alford Reeves	300		
Conservative	Victoria Lloyd	280	10.48	▼7.19
Conservative	Anthea Ward	268		
Conservative	Edward Scilloe	255		
Registered electors		6,488		▲47
Turnout		2,584	39.83	▼5.69
Rejected ballots		12	0.46	▲0.22
Labour hold				
Labour hold				
Labour hold				

=== 1992 by-election ===
A by-election took place on 9 July 1992, following the resignation of Candy Atherton.

1992 Junction by-election
Party	Candidate	Votes	%	±%
Labour	Lydia Richards	847	64.7	
Green	Beatrice Rolph	193	14.7	
Conservative	William Thomas	189	14.4	
Liberal Democrats	Kenneth Tranter	81	6.2	
Turnout			20.2	
Labour hold		Swing		

=== 1990 election ===
The election took place on 3 May 1990.

1990 Islington London Borough Council election: Junction (3)
Party	Candidate	Votes	%	±%
Labour	Candy Atherton	1,929	58.80	
Labour	Robert Durack	1,810		
Labour	Taha Karim	1,631		
Green	Mary Adshead	716	23.52	
Conservative	Kingsley Manning	567	17.67	
Conservative	Christine Cardow	553		
Conservative	Robin Cave	493		
Registered electors		6,441		
Turnout		2,932	45.52	
Rejected ballots		7	0.24	
Labour hold				
Labour hold				
Labour hold				

=== 1986 election ===
The election took place on 8 May 1986.

1986 Islington London Borough Council election: Junction (3)
Party	Candidate	Votes	%	±%
Labour	Maurice Barnes	1,813		
Labour	Candy Atherton	1,748		
Labour	Taha Karim	1,669		
Alliance	Patricia Julian	600		
Alliance	Stephen Cope	594		
Conservative	David Nicholson	545		
Alliance	Errol Smalley	523		
Conservative	Kingsley Manning	516		
Conservative	Nigel Boardman	491		
Green	Mary Adshead	206		
Registered electors		6,376		
Turnout			48.3	
Labour hold				
Labour hold				
Labour hold				

=== 1982 election ===
1982 Islington London Borough Council election: Junction (3)
Party	Candidate	Votes	%	±%
Labour	Maurice Barnes	1,450	36.11	
Labour Co-op	Taha Karim	1,376	33.13	
Labour Co-op	Derek Sawyer	1,283		
Conservative	Timothy Devlin	728	17.56	
Conservative	Kingsley Manning	712		
Conservative	David Nicholson	675		
Alliance	Mary McCann	558	13.20	
Alliance	Roy Lincoln	517		
Alliance	Patrick Sheeran	516		
Registered electors		6,341		
Turnout			44.7	
Labour hold				
Labour Co-op hold				
Labour Co-op hold				

=== 1978 election ===
The election took place on 4 May 1978.

1978 Islington London Borough Council election: Junction (3)
Party	Candidate	Votes	%	±%
Labour	Christopher King	1,504		
Labour	Catherine Kaplinsky	1,439		
Labour	Mark Van de Weyer	1,402		
Conservative	David Nicholson	1,088		
Conservative	Jonathan Sayeed	986		
Conservative	Michael Portillo	980		
National Front	Clifford Baker	97		
National Front	Anthony Hedge	97		
National Front	Ian Binnie	96		
Registered electors		6,428		
Turnout			44.2	
Labour win (new boundaries)				
Labour win (new boundaries)				
Labour win (new boundaries)				

== 1964–1978 Islington council elections ==
External images
- Junction ward boundaries from 1965 to 1978 (west)
- Junction ward boundaries from 1965 to 1978 (east)

=== 1974 election ===
The election took place on 2 May 1974.

1974 Islington London Borough Council election: Junction (4)
Party	Candidate	Votes	%	±%
Labour	K. Donoghue	1,161		
Labour	H. Metcalf	1,152		
Labour	Mark Van de Weyer	1,131		
Labour	V. Veness	1,089		
Conservative	R. Kinghorn	648		
Conservative	J. Hanvey	637		
Conservative	T. Northey	610		
Conservative	J. Sayeed	584		
Liberal	J. Froment	241		
Liberal	A. Brown	235		
Liberal	H. Barker	221		
Liberal	A. Toffel	216		
Registered electors		7,598		
Turnout			28.1	
Labour hold				
Labour hold				
Labour hold				
Labour hold				

=== 1972 by-election ===
The by-election took place on 16 November 1972.

1972 Junction by-election
Party	Candidate	Votes	%	±%
Labour	M. McCann	700		
Conservative	R. Kinghorn	418		
Turnout			13.9%	
Labour hold		Swing		

=== 1971 election ===
The election took place on 13 May 1971.

1971 Islington London Borough Council election: Junction (4)
Party	Candidate	Votes	%	±%
Labour	W. Musgrave	1,521		
Labour	David Davies	1,515		
Labour	George Barnard	1,497		
Labour	D. Robinson	1,447		
Conservative	R. Richardson	944		
Conservative	R. Kinghorn	939		
Conservative	C. Salaman	862		
Conservative	T. Yeo	851		
Registered electors		8,485		
Turnout			29.9	
Labour gain from Conservative		Swing		
Labour gain from Conservative		Swing		
Labour gain from Conservative		Swing		
Labour gain from Conservative		Swing		

=== 1968 election ===
The election took place on 9 May 1968.

1968 Islington London Borough Council election: Junction (4)
Party	Candidate	Votes	%	±%
Conservative	C. Bircher	1,359		
Conservative	S. Bron	1,327		
Conservative	R. Kinghorn	1,325		
Conservative	J. Szemerey	1,278		
Labour	P. Grant	934		
Labour	E. Hoodless	912		
Labour	A. White	881		
Labour	W. Musgrave	872		
Liberal	H. Barker	208		
Liberal	A. Mildren	157		
Communist	F. Rickett	89		
Registered electors		10,417		
Turnout			24.1	
Conservative gain from Labour		Swing		
Conservative gain from Labour		Swing		
Conservative gain from Labour		Swing		
Conservative gain from Labour		Swing		

=== 1964 election ===
The election took place on 7 May 1964.

1964 Islington London Borough Council election: Junction (4)
Party	Candidate	Votes	%	±%
Labour	P. Grant	1,229		
Labour	E. Plummer	1,221		
Labour	L. Ross	1,200		
Labour	C. Tarr	1,155		
Conservative	I. Akers	576		
Conservative	E. Ranson	527		
Conservative	J. Jones	523		
Conservative	H. Ranson	515		
Communist	K. Thomas	206		
Turnout		1,872	16.6	
Labour win (new seat)				
Labour win (new seat)				
Labour win (new seat)				
Labour win (new seat)				
