= Hillrise (ward) =

Electoral ward in the London Borough of Islington

- Electoral ward for the Islington London Borough Council
- Hillrise ward boundaries since 2022
- Borough: Islington
- County: Greater London
- Population: 14,970 (2021) (Note: 2021 Census data reported for 2022 ward boundaries)
- Electorate: 10,659 (2022)
- Area: 1.022 square kilometres (0.395 sq mi)

Current electoral ward
- Created: 1965
- Councillors: 3
- ONS code: 00AUGF (2002–2022)
- GSS code: E05000374 (2002–2022); E05013705 (2022–present)

Hillrise is an electoral ward in the London Borough of Islington. The ward has existed since the creation of the borough on 1 April 1965 and was first used in the 1964 elections. It returns councillors to Islington London Borough Council.

== Islington council elections since 2022 ==
There was a revision of ward boundaries in Islington in 2022. Hillrise gained some territory from Tollington ward and lost some territory to Junction ward.

=== August 2024 by-election ===
The by-election took place on 15 August 2024, following the resignation of Ollie Steadman. Shreya Nanda was elected.

August 2024 Hillrise by-election
Party	Candidate	Votes	%	±%
Labour	Shreya Nanda	968	43.35	−19.46
Independent	Alison Stoker	539	24.13	24.13
Liberal Democrats	Imogen Wall	350	15.67	+3.53
Green	Alex Nettle	322	14.42	−9.93
Independent	Maxim Parr-Reid	54	2.41	2.41
Turnout				
Labour hold		Swing		

=== May 2024 by-election ===
The by-election was held on 2 May 2024, following the resignation of former Mayor of Islington, Dave Poyser. It took place on the same day as the 2024 London mayoral election, the 2024 London Assembly election and 14 other borough council by-elections across London.

May 2024 Hillrise by-election
Party	Candidate	Votes	%	±%
Labour	Ollie Steadman	2,824	62.81	
Green	Alex Nettle	1,095	24.35	
Liberal Democrats	Rebecca Taylor	577	12.14	
Turnout				
Labour hold		Swing		

=== 2022 election ===
The election took place on 5 May 2022.

2022 Islington London Borough Council election: Hillrise
Party	Candidate	Votes	%	±%
Labour	Dave Poyser	2,453	66.3	
Labour	Michelline Safi-Ngongo	2,450	66.2	
Labour	Marian Spall	2,429	65.7	
Green	Susan Katherine Lees	840	22.7	
Green	Leah Natasha Partridge	701	18.9	
Green	Niall Creech	656	17.7	
Liberal Democrats	Mark Pack	386	10.4	
Liberal Democrats	Paul Massey	305	8.2	
Conservative	Jon Harrison	252	6.8	
Conservative	Janet Mary Cronshaw	250	6.8	
Conservative	Rastgon Aziz	238	6.4	
Liberal Democrats	Paul Martin Smith	139	3.8	
Turnout			36.4	
Labour win (new boundaries)				
Labour win (new boundaries)				
Labour win (new boundaries)				

== 2002–2022 Islington council elections ==
Hillrise ward boundaries from 2002 to 2022

There was a revision of ward boundaries in Islington in 2002.

=== 2018 election ===
The election took place on 3 May 2018.

2018 Islington London Borough Council election: Hillrise
Party	Candidate	Votes	%	±%
Labour	Marian Spall	2,446	63.6	
Labour	Michelline Ngongo	2,443	63.6	
Labour	Dave Poyser	2,369	61.6	
Women's Equality	Nikki Uppal	818	21.3	
Green	Anna Portch	486	12.6	
Green	Bernadette Wren	461	12.0	
Liberal Democrats	Lorraine Constantinou	423	11.0	
Liberal Democrats	Rosa Verity	403	10.5	
Green	Stephen Horne	345	9.0	
Liberal Democrats	Ursula Woolley	337	8.8	
Conservative	Julian Bridger	251	6.5	
Conservative	Ben Goldring	246	6.4	
Conservative	Zak Vora	196	5.1	
Turnout				
Labour hold		Swing		
Labour hold		Swing		
Labour hold		Swing		

=== 2014 election ===
The election took place on 22 May 2014.

2014 Islington London Borough Council election: Hillrise
Party	Candidate	Votes	%	±%
Labour	Marian Spall	2,065		
Labour	Michelline Ngongo	1,930		
Labour	David Poyser	1,925		
Liberal Democrats	Lorraine Constantinou	959		
Liberal Democrats	Carl Quilliam	856		
Liberal Democrats	Victor Kaufman	761		
Green	Jayne Forbes	727		
Green	Mary Adshead	711		
Green	Alex Rendall	530		
Turnout		3,708	41.9	−21.4
Labour hold		Swing		
Labour gain from Liberal Democrats		Swing		
Labour gain from Liberal Democrats		Swing		

=== 2010 election ===
The election on 6 May 2010 took place on the same day as the United Kingdom general election.

2010 Islington London Borough Council election: Hillrise
Party	Candidate	Votes	%	±%
Labour	Marian Spall	2,147		
Liberal Democrats	Lorraine Constantinou	2,073		
Liberal Democrats	Greg Foxsmith	2,066		
Labour	Stephen Ng	2,017		
Labour	Tom Ogg	1,966		
Liberal Democrats	Julia Williams	1,846		
Green	Mary Adshead	606		
Green	Mick Holloway	579		
Green	Daniel Hudson	526		
Conservative	Chinwe Bunting	501		
Conservative	Joseph Eldridge	494		
Conservative	Jackie Fage	458		
Turnout		15,279	63.3	+29.2
Labour gain from Liberal Democrats		Swing		
Liberal Democrats hold		Swing		
Liberal Democrats hold		Swing		

=== 2006 election ===
The election took place on 4 May 2006.

2006 Islington London Borough Council election: Hillrise
Party	Candidate	Votes	%	±%
Liberal Democrats	Fiona Dunlop	1,126	40.8	
Liberal Democrats	Greg Foxsmith	977		
Liberal Democrats	Julia Williams	958		
Labour	Marian Spall	920	33.3	
Labour	David Poyser	912		
Labour	Claudia Webbe	871		
Green	Michael Holloway	463	16.8	
Green	James North	373		
Green	Stephen Horne	329		
Conservative	Maureen Campbell	250	9.1	
Conservative	Paul Newman	190		
Turnout		7,369	34.1	+3.7
Liberal Democrats hold		Swing		
Liberal Democrats hold		Swing		
Liberal Democrats hold		Swing		

=== October 2003 by-election ===
The by-election took place on 30 October 2003, following the resignation of Sarah Teather.

October 2003 Hillrise by-election
Party	Candidate	Votes	%	±%
Liberal Democrats	Jayashankar Sharma	795	48.7	−1.1
Labour	Janet Burgess	595	36.5	−2.8
Green	Robin Latimer	177	10.9	+0.0
Conservative	John Wilkin	64	4.0	+4.0
Majority		200	12.3	
Turnout		1.631	20.4	
Liberal Democrats hold		Swing		

=== June 2003 by-election ===
The by-election took place on 26 June 2003, following the resignation of Paul Fox.

June 2003 Hillrise by-election
Party	Candidate	Votes	%	±%
Liberal Democrats	Fiona Dunlop	983	47.4	−2.4
Labour	Alan Clinton	789	38.1	−1.2
Green	Michael Holloway	239	11.5	+0.6
Conservative	John Wilkin	62	3.0	+3.0
Majority		194	9.4	
Turnout		2,073	26.1	
Liberal Democrats hold		Swing		

=== 2002 election ===
The election took place on 2 May 2002.

2002 Islington London Borough Council election: Hillrise
Party	Candidate	Votes	%	±%
Liberal Democrats	Paul Fox	1,308		
Liberal Democrats	Heather Johnson	1,205		
Liberal Democrats	Sarah Teather	1,142		
Labour	Alan Clinton	1,033		
Labour	Beverley Bruce	951		
Labour	John Wyman-White	857		
Green	Michael Holloway	285		
Green	John White	199		
Green	Penelope Kemp	184		
Turnout		7,164	30.4	
Liberal Democrats win (new boundaries)				
Liberal Democrats win (new boundaries)				
Liberal Democrats win (new boundaries)				

== 1978–2002 Islington council elections ==
There was a revision of ward boundaries in Islington in 1978.

=== 1999 by-election ===
The by-election took place on 16 December 1999, following the death of Milton Babulall. The result of the by-election caused control of Islington Council to be gained by the Liberal Democrats.

1999 Hillrise by-election
Party	Candidate	Votes	%	±%
Liberal Democrats	Paul Fox	1,317	61.4	+39.8
Labour	Adrian Pulham	695	32.4	−20.1
Green	Michael Holloway	60	2.8	−10.1
Independent	Ann Wood	39	1.8	+1.8
Conservative	Maureen Campbell	33	1.5	−11.4
Majority		622	29.0	
Turnout		2,144	32.0	
Liberal Democrats gain from Labour		Swing		

=== 1998 election ===
The election took place on 7 May 1998.

1998 Islington London Borough Council election: Hillrise
Party	Candidate	Votes	%	±%
Labour	Alan Clinton	1,036		
Labour	Milton Babulall	948		
Labour	Sheila Camp	940		
Liberal Democrats	Heather Eggins	426		
Liberal Democrats	James Sanderson	371		
Liberal Democrats	Philip Vaughan	328		
Conservative	Maureen Campbell	255		
Green	Victoria Olliver	255		
Conservative	Simon Cooper	180		
Conservative	Bryan Wilsher	143		
Turnout		4,882		
Labour hold		Swing		
Labour hold		Swing		
Labour hold		Swing		

=== 1994 election ===
The election took place on 5 May 1994.

1994 Islington London Borough Council election: Hillrise
Party	Candidate	Votes	%	±%
Labour	Alan Clinton	1,631	61.99	▲3.34
Labour	John Burke	1,591		
Labour	Ruth Steigman	1,378		
Liberal Democrats	Penelope Aitken	436	15.08	▲5.67
Liberal Democrats	Heather Eggins	372		
Liberal Democrats	James Upson	312		
Green	Judith Kleinman	232	9.38	▼8.90
Conservative	Neil Taylor	202	7.89	▼5.77
Conservative	Oriel Hutchinson	195		
Conservative	Jennifer Moody	189		
Residents	Derrick Heath	140	5.66	New
Registered electors		6,324		▲306
Turnout		2,419	38.25	▼6.08
Rejected ballots		6	0.25	▲0.06
Labour hold				
Labour hold				
Labour hold				

=== 1990 election ===
The election took place on 3 May 1990.

1990 Islington London Borough Council election: Hillrise
Party	Candidate	Votes	%
Labour	Alan Clinton	1,731	58.65
Labour	John Burke	1,664	
Labour	Dina Kleanthous	1,525	
Green	Roger Whitney	511	18.28
Conservative	Merryl Cave	391	13.66
Conservative	David Starkey	385	
Conservative	Elizabeth Stephens	371	
Liberal Democrats	Sarah Ludford	272	9.41
Liberal Democrats	Geoffrey Hubbard	254	
Registered electors		6,018	
Turnout		2,668	44.33
Rejected ballots		5	0.19
Labour hold			
Labour hold			
Labour hold			

=== 1986 election ===
The election took place on 8 May 1986.

1986 Islington London Borough Council election: Hillrise
Party	Candidate	Votes	%
Labour	Alan Clinton	1,757	
Labour	Milton Babulall	1,546	
Labour	Diana Coles	1,514	
Alliance	Geoffrey Hubbard	573	
Alliance	Daniel Janner	544	
Alliance	Sarah Ludford	522	
Conservative	Michael Dipre	413	
Conservative	Kenneth Hynes	389	
Conservative	Alexander Moody	338	
Green	Robin Macleod	187	
Registered electors		6.974	
Turnout			41.4
Labour hold			
Labour hold			
Labour hold			

=== 1982 election ===
The election took place on 6 May 1982.

1982 Islington London Borough Council election: Hillrise
Party	Candidate	Votes	%
Labour	Alan Clinton	1,426	
Labour Co-op	Milton Babulall	1,254	
Labour	William Sillett	1,220	
Conservative	Kenneth Graham	676	
Conservative	Michael Peters	653	
Conservative	Paul Ostway	635	
Alliance	Donald Hutchinson	512	
Alliance	Lize Evans	496	
Alliance	Efimia Marinos	443	
Registered electors		6,451	
Turnout			43.5
Labour hold			
Labour Co-op gain from Conservative			
Labour hold			

=== 1978 election ===
The election took place on 4 May 1978.

1978 Islington London Borough Council election: Hillrise
Party	Candidate	Votes	%
Labour	Mary McCann	858	
Conservative	Neil D. Kerr	843	
Labour	John Barnes	819	
Labour	Jack Lethbridge	808	
Conservative	Roman Kowalski	792	
Conservative	Timothy S.K. Yeo	730	
Socialist Unity	Kathryn Adams	110	
Socialist Unity	Michael P. Simpson	97	
National Front	Harold A. Farey	44	
National Front	John J. Taylor	40	
National Front	William Hall	34	
Registered electors		5,207	
Turnout			37.4
Labour win (new boundaries)			
Conservative win (new boundaries)			
Labour win (new boundaries)			

== 1964–1978 Islington council elections ==
External images
- Hillrise ward boundaries from 1965 to 1978 (west)
- Hillrise ward boundaries from 1965 to 1978 (east)

=== 1974 election ===
The election took place on 2 May 1974.

1974 Islington London Borough Council election: Hillrise
Party	Candidate	Votes	%
Labour	E. Brosnan	752	
Labour	M. McCann	745	
Labour	A. Murphy	737	
Conservative	A. Hathaway	246	
Conservative	E. Bull	235	
Conservative	R. Dunn	235	
Registered electors		4,689	
Turnout			23.1
Labour hold			
Labour hold			
Labour hold			

=== 1972 by-election ===
The by-election took place on 15 June 1972.

1972 Hillrise by-election
Party	Candidate	Votes	%	±%
Labour	J. Lethbridge	594		
Conservative	J. Hanvey	327		
Communist	J. Brady	71		
Turnout			17.2%	
Labour hold				

=== 1971 election ===
The election took place on 13 May 1971.

1971 Islington London Borough Council election: Hillrise
Party	Candidate	Votes	%
Labour	E. Brosnan	1,409	
Labour	A. Murphy	1,408	
Labour	L. Gyseman	1,367	
Conservative	A. Morris	633	
Conservative	R. Edmunds	612	
Conservative	W. Milner	609	
National Front	C. Boggs	79	
National Front	D. Lane-Walters	59	
Registered electors		6,574	
Turnout			33.2
Labour gain from Conservative			
Labour gain from Conservative			
Labour gain from Conservative			

=== 1968 election ===
The election took place on 9 May 1968.

1968 Islington London Borough Council election: Hillrise
Party	Candidate	Votes	%
Conservative	W. Finch	947	
Conservative	A. Forsyth	940	
Conservative	A. Morris	919	
Labour	S. Lubin	622	
Labour	A. Phillips	602	
Labour	L. Ross	600	
Registered electors		7,688	
Turnout			21.1
Conservative gain from Labour			
Conservative gain from Labour			
Conservative gain from Labour			

=== 1964 election ===
The election took place on 7 May 1964.

1964 Islington London Borough Council election: Hillrise
Party	Candidate	Votes	%
Labour	W. Hockin	1,037	
Labour	S. Ley	1,017	
Labour	A. White	982	
Conservative	G. Bennett	461	
Conservative	F. Markes	451	
Conservative	D. Whittington	442	
Communist	R. Bolster	110	
Registered electors		8,741	
Turnout		1,541	17.6
Labour win (new seat)			
Labour win (new seat)			
Labour win (new seat)			
