= Station (Islington ward) =

Electoral ward in London from 1965 to 1978

- Former electoral ward for the Islington London Borough Council
- Borough: Islington
- County: Greater London
- Population: 9,190 (1966 estimate)
- Electorate: 5,738 (1964); 4,913 (1968); 4,030 (1971); 3,307 (1974)
- Major settlements: Finsbury Park
- Area: 108 acres (0.44 km^{2})

Former electoral ward
- Created: 1965
- Abolished: 1978
- Councillors: 2

Station was an electoral ward in the London Borough of Islington from 1965 to 1978. The ward was first used in the 1964 elections and last used for the 1974 elections. The ward covered part of the Finsbury Park area to the west of Finsbury Park station. It returned two councillors to Islington London Borough Council. For elections to the Greater London Council, the ward was part of the Islington electoral division from 1965 and then the Islington North division from 1973.

== Islington council elections ==
=== 1974 election ===
The election took place on 2 May 1974.

1974 Islington London Borough Council election: Station (2)
Party	Candidate	Votes	%	±%
Labour	A. G. Smith	651		
Labour	A. Carty	643		
Conservative	K. N. Baxendale	92		
Turnout				
Labour hold		Swing		
Labour hold		Swing		

=== 1971 election ===
The election took place on 13 May 1971.

1971 Islington London Borough Council election: Station (2)
Party	Candidate	Votes	%	±%
Labour	A. Carty	941		
Labour	H. E. Jordan	907		
Conservative	D. W. J. Saunders	319		
Conservative	J. F. Saunders	298		
Turnout				
Labour hold		Swing		
Labour hold		Swing		

=== 1968 election ===
The election took place on 9 May 1968.

1968 Islington London Borough Council election: Station (2)
Party	Candidate	Votes	%	±%
Labour	M. O'Halloran	466		
Labour	D. B. Hoodless	450		
Conservative	N. S. Jamison	357		
Conservative	D. Tandy	344		
Communist	J. R. Bales	65		
Communist	A. Abatielos	52		
Turnout				
Labour hold		Swing		
Labour hold		Swing		

=== 1964 election ===
The election took place on 7 May 1964.

1964 Islington London Borough Council election: Station (2)
Party	Candidate	Votes	%	±%
Labour	W. Smith	605		
Labour	E. M. Simms	590		
Communist	C. Perry	87		
Turnout		687	12.0	
Labour win (new seat)				
Labour win (new seat)				
