= 1968 Islington London Borough Council election =

1968 local election in England

← 1964	9 May 1968	1971 →

All 60 council seats 31 seats needed for a majority
- Registered: 158,251
- Turnout: 22.5%
	First party	Second party	Third party
Party	Con	Lab	Ind
Seats before	0	60	0
Seats after	47	10	3
Seat change	▲47	▼50	▲3
Popular vote	56,613	42,725	2,438
Percentage	51.97%	39.22%	2.24%
Council control before election
Labour
Council control after election
Conservative

The 1968 Islington Council election took place on 9 May 1968 to elect members of Islington London Borough Council in London, England. The whole council was up for election and the Conservative party gained overall control of the council.

== Election result ==
1968 Islington London Borough Council election
Party	Seats	Gains	Losses	Net gain/loss	Seats %	Votes %	Votes	+/−
Conservative	47	47	0	▲47	78.33	51.97	56,613	
Labour	10	0	50	▼50	16.67	39.22	42,725	
Independent	3	3	0	▲3	5.00	2.24	2,438	
Liberal	0	0	0	Steady	0.00	2.58	2,813	
Islington Tenants & Ratepayers	0	0	0	Steady	0.00	1.96	2,133	
Communist	0	0	0	Steady	0.00	0.95	1,029	
Independent Labour	0	0	0	Steady	0.00	0.66	716	
Union Movement	0	0	0	Steady	0.00	0.42	460	
Total	60						108,927	

== Ward results ==
(*) - represents an incumbent councillor running for re-election

=== Barnsbury ===
Barnsbury (3)
Party	Candidate	Votes	%
Independent	Mrs B. Thompson	810	
Independent	T.W. Blyth	807	
Independent	M.P. Reynolds	805	
Labour	Dr M.G. O'Donoghue*	690	
Labour	D.J. Turner	575	
Labour	E.D. Ward	566	
Communist	J.W. Jones	124	
Islington Tenants & Ratepayers	J.A.R. Burgess	76	
Islington Tenants & Ratepayers	H.T. Twigg	62	
Islington Tenants & Ratepayers	D.G. Tidy	61	
Registered electors		7,013	
Turnout			23.5
Independent gain from Labour			
Independent gain from Labour			
Independent gain from Labour			

=== Bunhill ===
Bunhill (2)
Party	Candidate	Votes	%
Conservative	P.H.W. Britten	800	
Conservative	S.W. Morris	756	
Labour	George A.W. Ives	715	
Labour	A.E. Ley	675	
Communist	G.T.G. Jeffrey	127	
Registered electors		5,977	
Turnout			27.5
Conservative gain from Labour			
Conservative gain from Labour			

=== Canonbury ===
Canonbury (4)
Party	Candidate	Votes	%
Conservative	Mrs J.M. Baker	1,358	
Conservative	M.B.D. Halford	1,343	
Conservative	Miss E.M. Carlson	1,320	
Conservative	A.J.G. Hayes	1,295	
Labour	G.F. Chaloner*	1,036	
Labour	Mrs. M.M. Ford*	1,010	
Labour	Mrs A. Seeley*	1,003	
Labour	H.J. Robinson*	979	
Liberal	J.O. Carter	370	
Liberal	H.A. O'Shaughnessy	344	
Liberal	M. Paterson	340	
Liberal	J.P. Hudson	338	
Islington Tenants & Ratepayers	H.W. Bray	175	
Islington Tenants & Ratepayers	H. Bolger	143	
Islington Tenants & Ratepayers	A.N. Richardson	139	
Islington Tenants & Ratepayers	S.C. Herbert	111	
Independent	J.T. Yule	16	
Registered electors		11,528	
Turnout			25.7
Conservative gain from Labour			
Conservative gain from Labour			
Conservative gain from Labour			
Conservative gain from Labour			

=== Clerkenwell ===
Clerkenwell (3)
Party	Candidate	Votes	%
Labour	C. Slater*	842	
Labour	H.J. Stanfield	797	
Labour	J.T. Hanvey	777	
Conservative	C.J. Bacon	725	
Conservative	J.L. Tovell	696	
Conservative	K.J. O'Connor	695	
Registered electors		6,644	
Turnout			24.3
Labour hold			
Labour hold			
Labour hold			

=== Highbury ===
Highbury (4)
Party	Candidate	Votes	%
Conservative	Baile N.B.	1,192	
Conservative	Mrs. A.M.M. Beaumont	1,178	
Conservative	E.F. Bull	1,135	
Conservative	Mrs W.K.V. Milner	1,134	
Labour	G.A. Barnard*	811	
Labour	P.J. Blay	785	
Labour	A.G. Seeley*	724	
Labour	Mrs V.F. Prythergch	721	
Islington Tenants & Ratepayers	Mrs E.W. Lomas	105	
Islington Tenants & Ratepayers	E. Gray	90	
Islington Tenants & Ratepayers	T.D. White	87	
Islington Tenants & Ratepayers	R.F. Kattenhorn	80	
Registered electors		9,519	
Turnout			22.4
Conservative gain from Labour			
Conservative gain from Labour			
Conservative gain from Labour			
Conservative gain from Labour			

=== Highview ===
Highview (3)
Party	Candidate	Votes	%
Conservative	M.J. Bentley	1,183	
Conservative	M.W.L. Morris	1,163	
Conservative	J.T. Hanvey	1,161	
Labour	R.E.C. Jewell	633	
Labour	Mrs E.J. Walker	609	
Labour	A.A. Goldshaw	604	
Liberal	K.I. Parker	142	
Liberal	J.H. Phillips	140	
Communist	P. Lowman	111	
Registered electors		7,899	
Turnout			25.9
Conservative gain from Labour			
Conservative gain from Labour			
Conservative gain from Labour			

=== Hillmarton ===
Hillmarton (2)
Party	Candidate	Votes	%
Conservative	Mrs E.J. Pentecost	806	
Conservative	R.P.C. Taft	782	
Labour	A.E.J. Cannon*	507	
Labour	Mrs C.M. Colebeck	486	
Registered electors		6,309	
Turnout			21.8
Conservative gain from Labour			
Conservative gain from Labour			

=== Hillrise ===
Hillrise (3)
Party	Candidate	Votes	%
Conservative	W.M. Finch	947	
Conservative	A.E. Forsyth	940	
Conservative	Dr A.P. Morris	919	
Labour	S.C. Lubin	622	
Labour	Phillips A.W.	602	
Labour	L. Ross	600	
Registered electors		7,688	
Turnout			21.1
Conservative gain from Labour			
Conservative gain from Labour			
Conservative gain from Labour			

=== Holloway ===
Holloway (4)
Party	Candidate	Votes	%
Conservative	J.W.S. Bridgewater	523	
Labour	H.C. Beard	518	
Conservative	Mrs E. Bridgewater	509	
Conservative	Mrs M.E. Garner	490	
Conservative	Mrs M.P. Stubbs	483	
Labour	Miss J.E. Woodhall*	477	
Labour	C. Payne	461	
Labour	E. Holroyd-Doveton	460	
Union Movement	R.S. Pegg	460	
Communist	J.F. Moss	89	
Registered electors		8,921	
Turnout			13.1
Conservative gain from Labour			
Labour hold			
Conservative gain from Labour			
Conservative gain from Labour			

=== Junction ===
Junction (4)
Party	Candidate	Votes	%
Conservative	C.F. Bircher	1,359	
Conservative	Mrs S.R. Bron	1,327	
Conservative	R.R.F. Kinghorn	1,325	
Conservative	J. Szemerey	1,278	
Labour	P. Grant	934	
Labour	Mrs E.A. Hoodless	912	
Labour	A.E. White	881	
Labour	W.T. Musgrave	872	
Liberal	H.G. Barker	208	
Liberal	A.W. Mildren	157	
Communist	F. Rickett	89	
Registered electors		10,417	
Turnout			24.1
Conservative gain from Labour			
Conservative gain from Labour			
Conservative gain from Labour			
Conservative gain from Labour			

=== Mildmay ===
Mildmay (4)
Party	Candidate	Votes	%
Conservative	D.H. Bryant	1,953	
Conservative	R.E. Candlin	1,913	
Conservative	P.D. Bromley	1,898	
Conservative	E.D.R. Stone	1,886	
Labour	J.E. Payne	1,015	
Labour	Mrs Z. Bagnari	997	
Labour	J. Walker	996	
Labour	H.W.F. Ford	972	
Islington Tenants & Ratepayers	A.G. Batt	94	
Islington Tenants & Ratepayers	Mrs A. Inglott	82	
Islington Tenants & Ratepayers	A.J.W. Chavasse	80	
Islington Tenants & Ratepayers	R.J. Nabarro	76	
Registered electors		12,294	
Turnout			25.6
Conservative gain from Labour			
Conservative gain from Labour			
Conservative gain from Labour			
Conservative gain from Labour			

=== Parkway ===
Parkway (3)
Party	Candidate	Votes	%
Conservative	J.H. Preston	791	
Conservative	Mrs A.L. Sale	762	
Conservative	C.V. Carruthers-Watt	761	
Labour	Mrs D. King	567	
Labour	T.A. Clubb	546	
Labour	H.J. Reid	542	
Registered electors		8,299	
Turnout			17.1
Conservative gain from Labour			
Conservative gain from Labour			
Conservative gain from Labour			

=== Pentonville ===
Pentonville (3)
Party	Candidate	Votes	%
Conservative	Miss A.T. Callaghan	1,014	
Conservative	Miss E.A. Dudley	983	
Conservative	T.J.A. Northey	950	
Labour	R.J. Redrupp*	832	
Labour	W.C. Comley*	809	
Labour	J.F. Sabini*	760	
Registered electors		7,408	
Turnout			26.0
Conservative gain from Labour			
Conservative gain from Labour			
Conservative gain from Labour			

=== Quadrant ===
Quadrant (4)
Party	Candidate	Votes	%
Conservative	Mrs E.H. Archer	1,447	
Conservative	D.W. Bromfield	1,424	
Conservative	Miss P. Carr	1,410	
Conservative	R. Devonald-Lewis	1,380	
Labour	B.A. Bagnari	942	
Labour	L.S. Bailey	937	
Labour	W.G. Baker	925	
Labour	C.V.S. Connell	868	
Communist	D. Gilbert	105	
Islington Tenants & Ratepayers	Mrs G. Roberts	65	
Islington Tenants & Ratepayers	T.C. Maker	60	
Islington Tenants & Ratepayers	A.F. Fish	54	
Islington Tenants & Ratepayers	F. Watkins	44	
Registered electors		11,121	
Turnout			23.0
Conservative gain from Labour			
Conservative gain from Labour			
Conservative gain from Labour			
Conservative gain from Labour			

=== St George's ===
St George's (3)
Party	Candidate	Votes	%
Conservative	J.S. Horton-Hunter	895	
Conservative	R.E. Trott	893	
Labour	D.J. Davies	892	
Labour	D.M.J. Fallon	882	
Conservative	C.C. De Pass	881	
Conservative	R. Perry	870	
Registered electors		8,171	
Turnout			23.0
Conservative gain from Labour			
Conservative gain from Labour			
Labour hold			

=== St Mary ===
St Mary (3)
Party	Candidate	Votes	%
Conservative	Mrs R.J. Murray	948	
Conservative	Miss N. Morris	933	
Conservative	I.M. Thomas	932	
Labour	E.C. Gough	687	
Labour	R.L. Cross	686	
Labour	R. Mabey	674	
Communist	E.C. Archer	97	
Communist	M.R. Vodden	62	
Communist	P.J. Leppard	61	
Registered electors		8,138	
Turnout			22.4
Conservative gain from Labour			
Conservative gain from Labour			
Conservative gain from Labour			

=== St Peter ===
St Peter (3)
Party	Candidate	Votes	%
Conservative	D.J. James	1,036	
Conservative	N.D.E. Barran	1,023	
Conservative	Mrs N.D.W. Champ	977	
Labour	A.L. Bell	827	
Labour	R. Tollemache	813	
Labour	Mrs D.K.A. Rogers	775	77
Communist	Mrs M. Betteridge	164	
Registered electors		8,236	
Turnout			24.4
Conservative gain from Labour			
Conservative gain from Labour			
Conservative gain from Labour			

=== Station ===
Station (2)
Party	Candidate	Votes	%
Labour	M. O'Hallaran	466	
Labour	D.B. Hoodless	450	
Conservative	N.S. Jamison	357	
Conservative	D. Tandy	344	
Communist	J.R. Bales	65	
Communist	Mrs A. Abatielos	52	
Registered electors		4,913	
Turnout			19.1
Labour hold			
Labour hold			

=== Thornhill ===
Thornhill (3)
Party	Candidate	Votes	%
Labour	Mrs M.J. Harvey	384	
Labour	V. Martindale	365	
Labour	K. McGregor	355	
Liberal	P.J. Green	265	
Liberal	L.W. Eaks	264	
Independent Labour	Mrs I. Hagland	259	
Liberal	C.J.A. Rettie	245	
Independent Labour	V.J. Cordwell	232	
Independent Labour	T.F. Finch	225	
Islington Tenants & Ratepayers	A. Davis	155	
Islington Tenants & Ratepayers	Mrs J. Davis	147	
Islington Tenants & Ratepayers	A.E. Lomas	147	
Registered electors		7,756	
Turnout			14.8
Labour hold			
Labour hold			
Labour hold			
