= Pentonville (ward) =

Electoral ward in London from 1965 to 1978

- Former electoral ward for the Islington London Borough Council
- Borough: Islington
- County: Greater London
- Population: 10,980 (1966 estimate)
- Electorate: 6,169 (1964); 7,408 (1968); 6,663 (1971); 6,169 (1974)
- Major settlements: Pentonville
- Area: 182.2 acres (0.737 km^{2})

Former electoral ward
- Created: 1965
- Abolished: 1978
- Councillors: 3

Pentonville was an electoral ward in the London Borough of Islington from 1965 to 1978. The ward was first used in the 1964 elections and last used for the 1974 elections. It returned three councillors to Islington London Borough Council. For elections to the Greater London Council, the ward was part of the Islington electoral division from 1965 and then the Islington South and Finsbury division from 1973.

== Islington council elections ==
=== 1974 election ===
The election took place on 2 May 1974.

1974 Islington London Borough Council election: Pentonville (3)
| Party | Candidate | Votes | % | ±% |
|---|---|---|---|---|
| Labour | N. P. Riddell | 991 | | |
| Labour | J. F. Sabini | 907 | | |
| Labour | D. K. A. Rogers | 892 | | |
| Liberal | A. G. Richards | 348 | | |
| Liberal | S. W. Applin | 330 | | |
| Conservative | S. W. Morris | 328 | | |
| Liberal | B. S. Wright | 326 | | |
| Conservative | J. L. Tovell | 320 | | |
| Conservative | G. I. H. Traill | 301 | | |
| Communist | F. Cartwright | 52 | | |
| Turnout | | | | |
| Labour hold | | Swing | | |
| Labour hold | | Swing | | |
| Labour hold | | Swing | | |

=== 1971 election ===
The election took place on 13 May 1971.

1971 Islington London Borough Council election: Pentonville (3)
| Party | Candidate | Votes | % | ±% |
|---|---|---|---|---|
| Labour | R. J. Redrupp | 1,771 | | |
| Labour | N. P. Riddell | 1,673 | | |
| Labour | A. J. Coman | 1,637 | | |
| Conservative | A. T. Callaghan | 653 | | |
| Conservative | T. J. A. Northey | 641 | | |
| Conservative | E. A. Dudley | 622 | | |
| Turnout | | | | |
| Labour gain from Conservative | | Swing | | |
| Labour gain from Conservative | | Swing | | |
| Labour gain from Conservative | | Swing | | |

=== 1968 election ===
The election took place on 9 May 1968.

1968 Islington London Borough Council election: Pentonville (3)
| Party | Candidate | Votes | % | ±% |
|---|---|---|---|---|
| Conservative | A. T. Callaghan | 1,014 | | |
| Conservative | E. A. Dudley | 983 | | |
| Conservative | T. J. A. Northey | 950 | | |
| Labour | R. J. Redrupp | 832 | | |
| Labour | W. C. Comley | 809 | | |
| Labour | J. F. Sabini | 760 | | |
| Turnout | | | | |
| Conservative gain from Labour | | Swing | | |
| Conservative gain from Labour | | Swing | | |
| Conservative gain from Labour | | Swing | | |

=== 1964 election ===
The election took place on 7 May 1964.

1964 Islington London Borough Council election: Pentonville (3)
| Party | Candidate | Votes | % | ±% |
|---|---|---|---|---|
| Labour | R. J. Redrupp | 1,128 | | |
| Labour | W. C. Comley | 1,097 | | |
| Labour | J. F. Sabini | 1,073 | | |
| Conservative | W. A. Dudley | 370 | | |
| Conservative | A. H. Hull | 370 | | |
| Conservative | P. N. Gilbert | 360 | | |
| Liberal | A. S. Applin | 171 | | |
| Liberal | Mrs. J. Burns | 170 | | |
| Liberal | A. Cole | 169 | | |
| Turnout | | 1,686 | 18.9 | |
| Labour win (new seat) | | | | |
| Labour win (new seat) | | | | |
| Labour win (new seat) | | | | |
