= 1971 Islington London Borough Council election =

← 1968	13 May 1971	1974 →

All 60 Council seats 31 seats needed for a majority
- Registered: 144,653
- Turnout: 33.5%
	First party	Second party
Party	Labour	Conservative
Seats before	10	47
Seats after	60	0
Seat change	▲50	▼47
Popular vote	105,713	39,787
Percentage	71.29%	26.83%
Council control before election
Conservative
Council control after election
Labour

The 1971 Islington Council election took place on 13 May 1971 to elect members of Islington London Borough Council in London, England. The whole council was up for election and the Labour Party gained overall control of the council.

== Election result ==
1971 Islington London Borough Council election
Party	Seats	Gains	Losses	Net gain/loss	Seats %	Votes %	Votes	+/−
Labour	60	50	0	▲50	100.00	71.29	105,713	
Conservative	0	0	47	▼47	0.00	26.83	39,787	
Liberal	0	0	0	Steady	0.00	0.78	1,155	
Independent Labour	0	0	0	Steady	0.00	0.45	668	
Communist	0	0	0	Steady	0.00	0.36	533	
National Front	0	0	0	Steady	0.00	0.17	251	
Independent	0	0	3	▼3	0.00	0.05	67	
Dwarf	0	0	0	Steady	0.00	0.04	61	
Union Movement	0	0	0	Steady	0.00	0.03	43	
Total	60							

== Ward results ==
=== Barnsbury ===
Barnsbury (3)
Party	Candidate	Votes	%
Labour	Mrs P.J. Milsom	1,620	
Labour	Madeley R.J.	1,580	
Labour	R. Wylie	1,570	
Conservative	A.W. Rose	600	
Conservative	C.W. Alexander	599	
Conservative	Mrs S.M. Dykes	587	
Communist	J.W. Jones	124	
Dwarf	Miss L.E. Arnold	61	
Registered electors		6,220	
Turnout			38.7
Labour gain from Independent			
Labour gain from Independent			
Labour gain from Independent			

=== Bunhill ===
Bunhill (2)
Party	Candidate	Votes	%
Labour	Mrs E.K. Browning	1,579	
Labour	G.A.W. Ives	1,565	
Conservative	P.H.W. Britten*	518	
Conservative	S.W. Morris*	501	
Registered electors		5,635	
Turnout			38.1
Labour gain from Conservative			
Labour gain from Conservative			

=== Canonbury ===
Canonbury (4)
Party	Candidate	Votes	%
Labour	L.S. Bailey	2,749	
Labour	E.J.W. Bayliss	2,748	
Labour	V.J. Cordwell	2,655	
Labour	E.C. Gough	2,649	
Conservative	Miss E.M. Carlson*	792	
Conservative	Mrs G. Young	787	
Conservative	P.E.G. Kilmartin	775	
Conservative	J.A. Rooke	753	
Liberal	D.W.D. Ainger	144	
Liberal	A.W.R. Capel	135	
Liberal	J.O. Carter	118	
Liberal	J.P. Hudson	112	
Registered electors		10,494	
Turnout			36.2
Labour gain from Conservative			
Labour gain from Conservative			
Labour gain from Conservative			
Labour gain from Conservative			

=== Clerkenwell ===
Clerkenwell (3)
Party	Candidate	Votes	%
Labour	C. Slater	1,756	
Labour	G.D. Southgate	1,741	
Labour	H.J. Stanfield	1,732	
Conservative	Mrs A.A. Richards	302	
Conservative	P.A.T. Burman	286	
Conservative	R. Richards	283	
Communist	P.J. Leppard	77	
Registered electors		6,114	
Turnout			35.4
Labour hold			
Labour hold			
Labour hold			

=== Highbury ===
Highbury (4)
Party	Candidate	Votes	%
Labour	J.W. Straw	2,107	
Labour	H.C. Beard	2,104	
Labour	G.R. Taylor	2,097	
Labour	J. Walker	2,071	
Conservative	Mrs P.J. Wilsher	793	
Conservative	Miss L. Catterick	788	
Conservative	Mrs C.D.M. Jelbart	776	
Conservative	M.J. Prager	768	
Registered electors		9,161	
Turnout			33.4
Labour gain from Conservative			
Labour gain from Conservative			
Labour gain from Conservative			
Labour gain from Conservative			

=== Highview ===
Highview (3)
Party	Candidate	Votes	%
Labour	N.L. Hackett	1,587	
Labour	A.E.J. Cannon	1,525	
Labour	A.E. White	1,492	
Conservative	J.T. Hanvey*	629	
Conservative	M.J. Bentley*	616	
Conservative	Miss N. Morris	607	
Communist	Miss B.A. Brady	155	
Liberal	M.J. Bird	142	
Liberal	Mrs A.M. Brady	137	
Registered electors		7,775	
Turnout			31.7
Labour gain from Conservative			
Labour gain from Conservative			
Labour gain from Conservative			

=== Hillmarton ===
Hillmarton (2)
Party	Candidate	Votes	%
Labour	A.L. Bell	1,006	
Labour	M.A. Ogilvy-Webb	928	
Conservative	Mrs E.J. Pentecost*	534	
Conservative	R.P.C. Taft*	504	
Registered electors		4,721	
Turnout			33.7
Labour gain from Conservative			
Labour gain from Conservative			

=== Hillrise ===
Hillrise (3)
Party	Candidate	Votes	%
Labour	Miss E.M. Brosnan	1,409	
Labour	A.L. Murphy	1,408	
Labour	L.E. Gyseman	1,367	
Conservative	Dr A.P. Morris*	633	
Conservative	R.J. Edmunds	612	
Conservative	Mrs W.K.V. Milner	609	
National Front	C.W. Boggs	79	
National Front	D. Lane-Walters	59	
Registered electors		6,574	
Turnout			33.2
Labour gain from Conservative			
Labour gain from Conservative			
Labour gain from Conservative			

=== Holloway ===
Holloway (4)
Party	Candidate	Votes	%
Labour	Mrs. M.J. Harvey	1,479	
Labour	P.E. Haynes	1,453	
Labour	J.R.K. Peile	1,419	
Labour	E.M. Holroyd-Doveton	1,404	
Conservative	J.W.S. Bridgewater*	339	
Conservative	Mrs E.D. Bridgewater*	325	
Conservative	Mrs M.E. Garner*	321	
Conservative	B.J. Starkey	300	
Union Movement	A.J. SIbley	43	
Registered electors		8,223	
Turnout			23.8
Labour gain from Conservative			
Labour hold			
Labour gain from Conservative			
Labour gain from Conservative			

=== Junction ===
Junction (4)
Party	Candidate	Votes	%
Labour	W.T. Musgrave	1,521	
Labour	D.J. Davies	1,515	
Labour	G.A. Barnard	1,497	
Labour	D.J. Robinson	1,447	
Conservative	Mrs R. Richardson	944	
Conservative	R.R.F. Kinghorn*	939	
Conservative	C.F.A. Salaman	862	
Conservative	T.S.K. Yeo	851	
Registered electors		8,485	
Turnout			29.9
Labour gain from Conservative			
Labour gain from Conservative			
Labour gain from Conservative			
Labour gain from Conservative			

=== Mildmay ===
Mildmay (4)
Party	Candidate	Votes	%
Labour	Mrs P. Brown	2,744	
Labour	P.J.B. Dixon	2,663	
Labour	F.M. Perry	2,642	
Labour	D.A. Howell	2,592	
Conservative	P.D. Bromley*	1,403	
Conservative	N.B. Baile	1,400	
Conservative	R.E. Candlin*	1,395	
Conservative	D.H. Bryant*	1,361	
Independent	E.F. Bull	67	
Registered electors		12,089	
Turnout			36.3
Labour gain from Conservative			
Labour gain from Conservative			
Labour gain from Conservative			
Labour gain from Conservative			

=== Parkway ===
Parkway (3)
Party	Candidate	Votes	%
Labour	P. McKendry	1,573	
Labour	G.F. Flynn	1,521	
Labour	H.J. Reid	1,464	
Conservative	M.A. O'Leary	606	
Conservative	Mrs A.M.M. Beaumont	591	
Conservative	P.J.M. Sinclair	583	
Registered electors		7,705	
Turnout			30.5
Labour gain from Conservative			
Labour gain from Conservative			
Labour gain from Conservative			

=== Pentonville ===
Pentonville (3)
Party	Candidate	Votes	%
Labour	R.J. Redrupp	1,771	
Labour	N.P. Riddell	1,673	
Labour	A.J. Coman	1,637	
Conservative	Miss A.T. Callaghan*	653	
Conservative	T.J.A. Northey*	641	
Conservative	Miss E.A. Dudley*	622	
Registered electors		6,663	
Turnout			38.1
Labour gain from Conservative			
Labour gain from Conservative			
Labour gain from Conservative			

=== Quadrant ===
Quadrant (4)
Party	Candidate	Votes	%
Labour	Mrs P.A. Bradbury	2,480	
Labour	D. Gwyn-Jones	2,415	
Labour	P.L.B. Woodroffe	2,364	
Labour	Mrs R. Rogers	2,352	
Conservative	Mrs E.H. Archer*	1,031	
Conservative	R. Devonald-Lewis*	1,013	
Conservative	D.W. Bromfield*	1,011	
Conservative	R.C.J. Wright	1,000	
Registered electors		10,961	
Turnout			33.4
Labour gain from Conservative			
Labour gain from Conservative			
Labour gain from Conservative			
Labour gain from Conservative			

=== St George's ===
St George's (3)
Party	Candidate	Votes	%
Labour	Mrs H. Metcalf	1,404	
Labour	R. Perry	1,399	
Labour	O.J. Monaghan	1,393	
Conservative	J.S. Horton-Hunter	504	
Conservative	Mrs U.F. Barber	493	
Conservative	Mrs E.M. Stephens	463	
Liberal	A.G. Callegari	129	
Liberal	A.W. Mildren	127	
Liberal	J.M. Shields	111	
National Front	T.F. Savage	59	
National Front	G. Wilson	54	
Registered electors		7,562	
Turnout			29.0
Labour gain from Conservative			
Labour gain from Conservative			
Labour hold			

=== St Mary ===
St Mary (3)
Party	Candidate	Votes	%
Labour	R.J. Fairweather	1,938	
Labour	R.C. Mabey	1,793	
Labour	D.B. Hoodless	1,779	
Conservative	Mrs J.M. Baker	563	
Conservative	K.D. Boyd	548	
Conservative	R.H. Embleton	528	
Communist	Mrs M. Betteridge	177	
Registered electors		7,544	
Turnout			35.3
Labour gain from Conservative			
Labour gain from Conservative			
Labour gain from Conservative			

=== St Peter ===
St Peter (3)
Party	Candidate	Votes	%
Labour	Miss J. Gibson	2,053	
Labour	R.G. Lord	1,879	
Labour	A.E. Smith	1,844	
Conservative	P.R.C. Lloyd	1,004	
Conservative	W.G.M. Shipley	851	
Conservative	J. Szemerey	831	
Registered electors		7,853	
Turnout			38.5
Labour gain from Conservative			
Labour gain from Conservative			
Labour gain from Conservative			

=== Station ===
Station (2)
Party	Candidate	Votes	%
Labour	A. Carty	941	
Labour	H.E. Jordan	907	
Conservative	D.W.J. Saunders	319	
Conservative	Mrs J.F. Saunders	298	
Registered electors		4,030	
Turnout			32.7
Labour hold			
Labour hold			

=== Thornhill ===
Thornhill (3)
Party	Candidate	Votes	%
Labour	A. Baker	1,294	
Labour	Mrs I. Hagland	1,278	
Labour	Mrs D.K.A. Rogers	1,140	
Conservative	T.P. Kelly	461	
Conservative	J.R. Rush	426	
Conservative	D.T. Taylor	423	
Independent Labour	H.W. Bray	252	
Independent Labour	G.J. Nash	228	
Independent Labour	R.A. Nash	188	
Registered electors		6,844	
Turnout			30.1
Labour hold			
Labour hold			
Labour hold			
