= Parkway (ward) =

Electoral ward in London from 1965 to 1978

- Former electoral ward for the Islington London Borough Council
- Borough: Islington
- County: Greater London
- Population: 12,990 (1966 estimate)
- Electorate: 8,621 (1964); 8,299 (1968); 7,705 (1971); 6,803 (1974)
- Area: 168.4 acres (0.681 km^{2})

Former electoral ward
- Created: 1965
- Abolished: 1978
- Councillors: 3

Parkway was an electoral ward in the London Borough of Islington from 1965 to 1978. The ward was first used in the 1964 elections and last used for the 1974 elections. It returned three councillors to Islington London Borough Council. For elections to the Greater London Council, the ward was part of the Islington electoral division from 1965 and then the Islington North division from 1973.

== Islington council elections ==
=== 1974 election ===
The election took place on 2 May 1974.

1974 Islington London Borough Council election: Parkway (3)
Party	Candidate	Votes	%	±%
Labour	P. A. Holmes	1,049		
Labour	C. O'Brien	1,036		
Labour	F. W. H. Sandford	975		
National Front	E. Richardson	225		
National Front	D. F. Painter	196		
National Front	J. O. Wingrove	188		
Conservative	A. M. Furbank	185		
Conservative	J. M. G. Baile	172		
Turnout				
Labour hold		Swing		
Labour hold		Swing		
Labour hold		Swing		

=== 1971 election ===
The election took place on 13 May 1971.

1971 Islington London Borough Council election: Parkway (3)
Party	Candidate	Votes	%	±%
Labour	P. McKendry	1,573		
Labour	G. F. Flynn	1,521		
Labour	H. J. Reid	1,464		
Conservative	M. A. O'Leary	606		
Conservative	A. M. M. Beaumont	591		
Conservative	P. J. M. Sinclair	583		
Turnout				
Labour gain from Conservative		Swing		
Labour gain from Conservative		Swing		
Labour gain from Conservative		Swing		

=== 1968 election ===
The election took place on 9 May 1968.

1968 Islington London Borough Council election: Parkway (3)
Party	Candidate	Votes	%	±%
Conservative	J. H. Preston	791		
Conservative	A. L. Sale	762		
Conservative	C. V. Carruthers-Watt	761		
Labour	D. King	567		
Labour	T. A. Clubb	546		
Labour	H. J. Reid	542		
Turnout				
Conservative gain from Labour		Swing		
Conservative gain from Labour		Swing		
Conservative gain from Labour		Swing		

=== 1964 election ===
The election took place on 7 May 1964.

1964 Islington London Borough Council election: Parkway (3)
Party	Candidate	Votes	%	±%
Labour	T. A. Clubb	837		
Labour	H. J. Reid	832		
Labour	T. C. Rooney	831		
Conservative	D. Greenland	137		
Conservative	N. S. Jamison	130		
Communist	G. Riddell	124		
Conservative	M. Simmonds	124		
Turnout		1,065	12.4	
Labour win (new seat)				
Labour win (new seat)				
Labour win (new seat)				
