= 1964 Islington London Borough Council election =

← N/A	7 May 1964	1968 →

All 60 council seats 31 seats needed for a majority
- Registered: 174,595
- Turnout: 29,288, 16.8%
	First party	Second party
Party	Labour	Conservative
Seats before	New council
Seats after	60
Council control before election
Didn't exist
Council control after election
Labour

The 1964 Islington Council election took place on 7 May 1964 to elect members of Islington London Borough Council in London, England. The whole council was up for election and the Labour party gained control of the council.

== Background ==
These elections were the first to the newly formed borough. Previously elections had taken place in the Metropolitan Borough of Finsbury and Metropolitan Borough of Islington. These boroughs were joined to form the new London Borough of Islington by the London Government Act 1963.

A total of 171 candidates stood in the election for the 60 seats being contested across 19 wards. These included a full slate from the Labour party, while the Conservative and Liberal parties stood 55 and 18 respectively. Other candidates included 19 New Liberal candidates, 13 Communists, 1 Independent Communist, 1 Independent Labour, 1 Union Movement and 3 Independent P/Labour. There were 10 three-seat wards, 6 four-seat wards and 3 two-seat wards.

This election had aldermen as well as directly elected councillors. Labour got all 10 aldermen.

The Council was elected in 1964 as a "shadow authority" but did not start operations until 1 April 1965.

== Election result ==
The results saw Labour gain the new council after winning all 60 seats. Overall turnout in the election was 16.8%. This turnout included 461 postal votes.

1964 Islington London Borough Council election
Party	Seats	Gains	Losses	Net gain/loss	Seats %	Votes %	Votes	+/−
Total	60							

== Ward results ==
=== Barnsbury ===
Barnsbury (3)
Party	Candidate	Votes	%
Labour	Dr. M. G. O'Donoghue	1,155	
Labour	Mrs. E. Brown	1,068	
Labour	C. Goddard	1,058	
Conservative	P. E. Postgate	191	
Conservative	G. F. Luttridge	183	
Conservative	F. H. Luttridge	174	
Communist	J. W. Jones	128	
Registered electors		8,081	
Turnout		1,428	17.7
Labour win (new seat)			
Labour win (new seat)			
Labour win (new seat)			

=== Bunhill ===
Bunhill (2)
Party	Candidate	Votes	%
Labour	C. Payne	979	
Labour	A. A. Goldshaw	947	
Conservative	Mrs. L. M. Baycock	250	
Conservative	W. D. Barrett	246	
Communist	F. O'Shea	124	
Liberal	E. Hull	114	
Liberal	S. Raphael	103	
Independent Communist	I. Kenna	79	
Registered electors		6,355	
Turnout		1,479	23.3
Labour win (new seat)			
Labour win (new seat)			

=== Canonbury ===
Canonbury (4)
Party	Candidate	Votes	%
Labour	G. F. Chaloner	1,464	
Labour	H. J. Robinson	1,436	
Labour	Mrs. A. Seeley	1,431	
Labour	Mrs. M. M. Ford	1,423	
Conservative	J. P. Bennett	370	
Conservative	Miss E. M. Carlson	361	
Conservative	Miss D. Driscoll	350	
Conservative	P. E. Medlycott	322	
Liberal	C. Simpson	216	
Liberal	P. J. Hudson	213	
Liberal	D. A. Heigham	209	
Liberal	T. Tarling	205	
New Liberal	F. White	160	
New Liberal	A. Midson	158	
New Liberal	T. Savage	156	
New Liberal	S. Popkin	145	
Independent Labour	J. T. Yule	22	
Registered electors		11,887	
Turnout		2,193	18.4
Labour win (new seat)			
Labour win (new seat)			
Labour win (new seat)			
Labour win (new seat)			

=== Clerkenwell ===
Clerkenwell (3)
Party	Candidate	Votes	%
Labour	C. Slater	943	
Labour	J. Trotter	926	
Labour	S. W. Withey	886	
Conservative	Mrs. J. P. Smith	240	
Conservative	S. J. Thomas	240	
Conservative	Mrs. M. J. Mason	232	
Liberal	C. Wicker	137	
Liberal	H. Wilson	131	
Liberal	Miss D. Edwardes	106	
Registered electors		8,113	
Turnout		1,318	16.2
Labour win (new seat)			
Labour win (new seat)			
Labour win (new seat)			

=== Highbury ===
Highbury (4)
Party	Candidate	Votes	%
Labour	G. A. Barnard	1,127	
Labour	A. G. Seeley	1,103	
Labour	L. T. Coombs	1,100	
Labour	D. J. Lewis	1,094	
Conservative	Mrs. V. M. Brand	429	
Conservative	E. M. Williams	429	
Conservative	Mrs. C. D. Jelbart	424	
Conservative	K. J. Wenden	418	
New Liberal	F. Barrett	210	
New Liberal	A. G. Batt	194	
New Liberal	V. Babb	193	
New Liberal	A. White	174	
Registered electors		11,003	
Turnout		1,777	16.2
Labour win (new seat)			
Labour win (new seat)			
Labour win (new seat)			
Labour win (new seat)			

=== Highview ===
Highview (3)
Party	Candidate	Votes	%
Labour	S. C. Lubin	1,073	
Labour	D. J. Davies	1,065	
Labour	J. B. Thirlwell	1,055	
Conservative	D. W. Bromfield	711	
Conservative	Miss A. T. Callaghan	698	
Conservative	E. I. Jones	670	
Liberal	K. I. Parker	188	
Communist	J. Kean	95	
Registered electors		8,576	
Turnout		1,939	22.6
Labour win (new seat)			
Labour win (new seat)			
Labour win (new seat)			

=== Hillmarton ===
Hillmarton (2)
Party	Candidate	Votes	%
Labour	H. Brack	648	
Labour	A. J. Cannon	639	
Conservative	Mrs. M. H. Leeson	318	
Conservative	R. P. C. Taft	314	
Communist	R. Scaffardi	52	
Registered electors		6,498	
Turnout		1,024	15.8
Labour win (new seat)			
Labour win (new seat)			

=== Hillrise ===
Hillrise (3)
Party	Candidate	Votes	%
Labour	W. Hockin	1,037	
Labour	S. E. Ley	1,017	
Labour	A. E. White	982	
Conservative	G. W. Bennett	461	
Conservative	Mrs. F. P. Markes	451	
Conservative	Mrs. D. Whittington	442	
Communist	R. Bolster	110	
Registered electors		8,741	
Turnout		1,541	17.6
Labour win (new seat)			
Labour win (new seat)			
Labour win (new seat)			

=== Holloway ===
Holloway (4)
Party	Candidate	Votes	%
Labour	W. G. Baker	929	
Labour	Mrs. F. H. Cantwell	920	
Labour	Miss J. E. Woodhall	893	
Labour	Mrs. V. F. Prythergch	879	
Conservative	Mrs. M. M. Bourne	189	
Conservative	Mrs. N. D. Champ	181	
Conservative	Mrs. H. P. Stubbs	160	
Conservative	G. E. Leeson	149	
Communist	J. F. Moss	134	
Union Movement	R. S. Pegg	102	
Registered electors		10,256	
Turnout		1,242	12.1
Labour win (new seat)			
Labour win (new seat)			
Labour win (new seat)			
Labour win (new seat)			

=== Junction ===
Junction (4)
Party	Candidate	Votes	%
Labour	P. Grant	1,229	
Labour	Mrs. E. A. Plummer	1,221	
Labour	L. Ross	1,200	
Labour	C. S. Tarr	1,155	
Conservative	Mrs. I. M. Akers	576	
Conservative	E. J. Ranson	527	
Conservative	Mrs. J. Jones	523	
Conservative	H. J. Ranson	515	
Communist	Mrs. K. Thomas	206	
Registered electors		11,306	
Turnout		1,872	16.6
Labour win (new seat)			
Labour win (new seat)			
Labour win (new seat)			
Labour win (new seat)			

=== Mildmay ===
Mildmay (4)
Party	Candidate	Votes	%
Labour	H. W. F. Ford	1,248	
Labour	J. Walker	1,245	
Labour	Mrs. Z. Bagnari	1,241	
Labour	Mrs. M. M. Short	1,233	
Conservative	Miss P. Carr	619	
Conservative	Mrs. E. H. Archer	609	
Conservative	C. G. Roche	603	
Conservative	J. W. Nott	597	
Liberal	Mrs. U. F. Barber	240	
Liberal	C. S. Hatchard	216	
Liberal	K. Scriven	210	
Liberal	S. T. Leigh	205	
New Liberal	Miss E. Newman	147	
New Liberal	Mrs. Elsie W. Lomas	145	
New Liberal	S. Morris	140	
New Liberal	R. J. Nabarro	140	
Registered electors		12,502	
Turnout		2,247	18.0
Labour win (new seat)			
Labour win (new seat)			
Labour win (new seat)			
Labour win (new seat)			

=== Parkway ===
Parkway (3)
Party	Candidate	Votes	%
Labour	T. A. Clubb	837	
Labour	H. J. Reid	832	
Labour	T. C. Rooney	831	
Conservative	Mrs. D. Greenland	137	
Conservative	N. S. Jamison	130	
Communist	G. Riddell	124	
Conservative	Miss M. Simmonds	124	
Registered electors		8,621	
Turnout		1,065	12.4
Labour win (new seat)			
Labour win (new seat)			
Labour win (new seat)			

=== Pentonville ===
Pentonville (3)
Party	Candidate	Votes	%
Labour	R. J. Redrupp	1,128	
Labour	W. C. Comley	1,097	
Labour	J. F. Sabini	1,073	
Conservative	Mrs. W. A. Dudley	370	
Conservative	A. H. Hull	370	
Conservative	P. N. Gilbert	360	
Liberal	A. S. Applin	171	
Liberal	Mrs. J. Burns	170	
Liberal	A. Cole	169	
Registered electors		8,925	
Turnout		1,686	18.9
Labour win (new seat)			
Labour win (new seat)			
Labour win (new seat)			

=== Quadrant ===
Quadrant (4)
Party	Candidate	Votes	%
Labour	L. S. Bailey	1,252	
Labour	B. A. Bagnari	1,250	
Labour	C. V. Connell	1,212	
Labour	Mrs. B. Stradling	1,186	
Conservative	Miss L. O. Clark	564	
Conservative	Miss D. E. Nelson	551	
Conservative	Miss C. J. Wells	546	
Conservative	N. Victor	541	
New Liberal	Mrs. I. Barrett	288	
New Liberal	W. Eaton	246	
New Liberal	Mrs. E. White	245	
New Liberal	W. Wilsher	234	
Communist	Mrs. R. Apter	111	
Registered electors		11,930	
Turnout		2,120	17.8
Labour win (new seat)			
Labour win (new seat)			
Labour win (new seat)			
Labour win (new seat)			

=== St George's ===
St George's (3)
Party	Candidate	Votes	%
Labour	Mrs. E. J. Walker	964	
Labour	J. Barnes	957	
Labour	N. Hitchen	952	
Conservative	Mrs. L. R. Bennett	391	
Conservative	Miss R. Smith	372	
Conservative	Mrs. M. German	358	
Liberal	Mrs. D. Balden	176	
Registered electors		8,321	
Turnout		1,449	17.4
Labour win (new seat)			
Labour win (new seat)			
Labour win (new seat)			

=== St Mary ===
St Mary (3)
Party	Candidate	Votes	%
Labour	E. C. Gough	831	
Labour	R. L. Cross	814	
Labour	G. A. Ives	800	
Conservative	R. A. Baker	278	
Conservative	C. V. Bourne	269	
Conservative	Miss A. G. Leeson	262	
Communist	E. Collings	109	
Registered electors		8,608	
Turnout		1,181	13.7
Labour win (new seat)			
Labour win (new seat)			
Labour win (new seat)			

=== St Peter ===
St Peter (3)
Party	Candidate	Votes	%
Labour	A. L. Bell	1,250	
Labour	E. D. Ward	1,235	
Labour	Mrs. D. K. Rogers	1,224	
Conservative	G. P. Smith	268	
Conservative	E. A. Day	263	
Conservative	D. S. Manuel	233	
Communist	Mrs. M. Betteridge	102	
Registered electors		9,761	
Turnout		1,590	16.3
Labour win (new seat)			
Labour win (new seat)			
Labour win (new seat)			

=== Station ===
Station (2)
Party	Candidate	Votes	%
Labour	W. Smith	605	
Labour	Mrs. E. M. Simms	590	
Communist	Mrs. C. Perry	87	
Registered electors		5,738	
Turnout		687	12.0
Labour win (new seat)			
Labour win (new seat)			

=== Thornhill ===
Thornhill (3)
Party	Candidate	Votes	%
Labour	Mrs. E. M. Simpkins	800	
Labour	H. Beard	790	
Labour	W. E. Simpkins	769	
Independent P/Labour	A. Bennett	316	
Independent P/Labour	W. J. Morley	287	
Independent P/Labour	R. Morley	279	
New Liberal	Miss A. Lewis	247	
New Liberal	A. Davis	239	
New Liberal	Alan Ernest Lomas	234	
Communist	D. Dunn	90	
Registered electors		9,373	
Turnout		1,450	15.5
Labour win (new seat)			
Labour win (new seat)			
Labour win (new seat)			
