= 1974 Islington London Borough Council election =

← 1971	2 May 1974	1978 →

All 60 council seats 31 seats needed for a majority
- Registered: 129,353
- Turnout: 26.0%
	First party	Second party	Third party
Party	Labour	Conservative	Liberal
Last election	60 seats,	0 seats,	0 seats,
Seats before	60	0	0
Seats after	60	0	0
Popular vote	69,423	24,286	10,927
Percentage	65.26%	22.83%	10.27%
Council control before election
Labour
Council control after election
Labour

The 1974 Islington Council election took place on 2 May 1974 to elect members of Islington London Borough Council in London, England. The whole council was up for election and the Labour Party stayed in overall control of the council.

== Election result ==
1974 Islington Borough Council election
Party	Seats	Gains	Losses	Net gain/loss	Seats %	Votes %	Votes	+/−
Labour	60	0	0	Steady	100.00	65.26	69,423	
Conservative	0	0	0	Steady	3.84	22.83	24,286	
Liberal	0	0	0	Steady	0.00	10.27	10,927	
National Front	0	0	0	Steady	0.00	0.57	609	
Communist	0	0	0	Steady	0.00	0.56	601	
Independent Liberal	0	0	0	Steady	0.00	0.49	526	
Total	60						106,372	

== Ward results ==
(*) - Represents an incumbent councillor running for re-election

=== Barnsbury ===
Barnsbury (3)
Party	Candidate	Votes	%
Labour	Mrs. M.E. Watson	836	
Labour	M. McAskill	830	
Labour	M.B. Conway	822	
Conservative	J. A. A. Field	421	
Conservative	L.T.E. McAfee	387	
Conservative	D.T. Taylor	386	
Liberal	Mrs M.S.Pears	327	
Liberal	M.C. Oilard	305	
Liberal	Mrs H.S. Smith	266	
Communist	Mrs. P.S. Sentinella	90	
Registered electors		5,322	
Turnout			31.6
Labour hold			
Labour hold			
Labour hold			

=== Bunhill ===
Bunhill (2)
Party	Candidate	Votes	%
Labour	Mrs E.K. Browning*	1,044	
Labour	G.A.W. Ives*	1,037	
Conservative	A.H.S. Hull	382	
Conservative	D.A. Douglas	364	
Registered electors		5,652	
Turnout			26.3
Labour hold			
Labour hold			

=== Canonbury ===
Canonbury (4)
Party	Candidate	Votes	%
Labour	Mrs. E.J.W. Bayliss*	1,875	
Labour	L.S. Bailey*	1,801	
Labour	F. Johns	1,789	
Labour	J.C. Score	1,737	
Liberal	Mrs. B.J. Capel	476	
Liberal	S.F. Hampson	461	
Liberal	J.S Knight	446	
Liberal	R.G.L. Stileman	423	
Conservative	Miss E.M. Carlson	385	
Conservative	Mrs. B.A. Devonald-Lewis	374	
Conservative	J.A. Rooke	351	
Conservative	P.E.G. Kilmartin	340	
Registered electors		9,881	
Turnout			28.1
Labour hold			
Labour hold			
Labour hold			
Labour hold			

=== Clerkenwell ===
Clerkenwell (3)
Party	Candidate	Votes	%
Labour	G.D. Southgate*	939	
Labour	D. Hyams	936	
Labour	H.J. Stanfield*	914	
Conservative	Mrs. L.M. Rush	261	
Conservative	Mrs. M.G. Taylor	255	
Conservative	R.E. Trott	234	
Registered electors		5,694	
Turnout			22.2
Labour hold			
Labour hold			
Labour hold			

=== Highbury ===
Highbury (4)
Party	Candidate	Votes	%
Labour	Mrs P. Brown	1,296	
Labour	J. Walker*	1,270	
Labour	G.R. Taylor*	1,265	
Labour	J.W. Straw*	1,262	
Conservative	F.R. Garner	409	
Conservative	Mrs C.D.M. Jelbart	405	
Conservative	Mrs M.A.K. Malone	399	
Conservative	Mrs M.E. Garner	396	
Liberal	D.F. Davies	305	
Liberal	Mrs M.I. Campbell	302	
Liberal	Miss V.M. Brand	300	
Liberal	G.A. Dobison	271	
Registered electors		8,582	
Turnout			24.6
Labour hold			
Labour hold			
Labour hold			
Labour hold			

=== Highview ===
Highview (3)
Party	Candidate	Votes	%
Labour	J.C. Evans	1,154	
Labour	A.J. Kirby	1,127	
Labour	A.E. White*	1,085	
Conservative	H.A.C. Collingham	519	
Conservative	R.P.C. Taft	499	
Conservative	T.S.K Yeo	491	
Communist	Miss B.A. Brady	126	
Registered electors		7,313	
Turnout			23.1
Labour hold			
Labour hold			
Labour hold			

=== Hillmarton ===
Hillmarton (2)
Party	Candidate	Votes	%
Labour	A.L. Bell*	694	
Labour	Mrs P. Kershaw	658	
Conservative	Mrs E.D. Bridgewater	348	
Conservative	J.W.S. Bridgewater	346	
Registered electors		4,257	
Turnout			25.7
Labour hold			
Labour hold			

=== Hillrise ===
Hillrise (3)
Party	Candidate	Votes	%
Labour	Mrs E.M. Brosnan*	752	
Labour	Miss M. McCann	745	
Labour	A.L. Murphy*	737	
Conservative	Miss A.D. Hathaway	246	
Conservative	E.F. Bull	235	
Conservative	R.W. Dunn	235	
Registered electors		4,689	
Turnout			23.1
Labour hold			
Labour hold			
Labour hold			

=== Holloway ===
Holloway (4)
Party	Candidate	Votes	%
Labour	W. Moroney	717	
Labour	P.E. Haynes*	715	
Labour	E.M. Holroyd-Doveton*	704	
Labour	D. Aitchison	699	
Liberal	J.D. Carvel	295	
Liberal	Mrs M. Wilkins	287	
Liberal	Mrs C.H. Williams	285	
Liberal	G. Sattin	281	
Conservative	C.A. Amodio	135	
Conservative	Mrs S.J. Marcus	130	
Conservative	Mrs N.E. Sullivan	128	
Conservative	Mrs D.J. Suckling	121	
Registered electors		5.590	
Turnout			21.9
Labour hold			
Labour hold			
Labour hold			
Labour hold			

=== Junction ===
Junction (4)
Party	Candidate	Votes	%
Labour	Mrs K.P. Donoghue	1,161	
Labour	Mrs H. Metcalf	1,152	
Labour	M.S.B. Van de Weyer	1,131	
Labour	Mrs V.A. Veness	1,089	
Conservative	R.R.F. Kinghorn	648	
Conservative	J.T. Hanvey	637	
Conservative	T.J.A. Northey	610	
Conservative	J. Sayeed	584	
Liberal	J.W. Froment	241	
Liberal	A.E. Brown	235	
Liberal	H.G. Barker	221	
Liberal	A.J. Toffel	216	
Registered electors		7,598	
Turnout			28.1
Labour hold			
Labour hold			
Labour hold			
Labour hold			

=== Mildmay ===
Mildmay (4)
Party	Candidate	Votes	%
Labour	Mrs J.B. Gibson	1,653	
Labour	D.A. Howell*	1,640	
Labour	F.M. Perry*	1,631	
Labour	Mrs M.A. Ogilvy-Webb	1,597	
Conservative	Mrs A.M.M. Beaumont	779	
Conservative	A.E. Forsyth	756	
Conservative	C.S. Millar	740	
Conservative	N.B. Baile	732	
Liberal	Mrs P.M. Duncan	641	
Liberal	A.W.R. Capel	636	
Liberal	R.C. James	626	
Liberal	Mrs P.F. Stileman	564	
Registered electors		11,191	
Turnout			28.7
Labour hold			
Labour hold			
Labour hold			
Labour hold			

=== Parkway ===
Parkway (3)
Party	Candidate	Votes	%
Labour	P. A. Holmes	1,049	
Labour	C. O'Brien	1,036	
Labour	F. W. H. Sandford	975	
National Front	E. Richardson	225	
National Front	D. F. Painter	196	
National Front	J. O. Wingrove	188	
Conservative	A. M. Furbank	185	
Conservative	J. M. G. Baile	172	
Turnout			
Labour hold			
Labour hold			
Labour hold			

=== Pentonville ===
Pentonville (3)
Party	Candidate	Votes	%
Labour	N. P. Riddell*	991	
Labour	J. F. Sabini	907	
Labour	D. K. A. Rogers	892	
Liberal	A. G. Richards	348	
Liberal	S. W. Applin	330	
Conservative	S. W. Morris	328	
Liberal	B. S. Wright	326	
Conservative	J. L. Tovell	320	
Conservative	G. I. H. Traill	301	
Communist	F. Cartwright	52	
Turnout			
Labour hold			
Labour hold			
Labour hold			

=== Quadrant ===
Quadrant (4)
Party	Candidate	Votes	%
Labour	Mrs P.A. Bradbury*	2,480	
Labour	D. Gwyn-Jones	2,415	
Labour	P.L.B. Woodroffe	2,364	
Labour	Mrs R. Rogers	2,352	
Conservative	Mrs E.H. Archer	1,031	
Conservative	R. Devonald-Lewis	1,013	
Conservative	D.W. Bromfield	1,011	
Conservative	R.C.J. Wright	1,000	
Registered electors		10,233	
Turnout			23.8
Labour hold			
Labour hold			
Labour hold			
Labour hold			

=== St George's ===
St George's (3)
Party	Candidate	Votes	%
Labour	D.J. Davies	1,263	
Labour	H. Hodge	1,241	
Labour	Mrs J.L. Streather	1,204	
Conservative	J.S. Horton-Hunter	491	
Conservative	Mrs E.M. Stephens	481	
Conservative	G.M. Wolfson	461	
Registered electors		7,516	
Turnout			24.6
Labour hold			
Labour hold			
Labour hold			

=== St Mary ===
St Mary (3)
Party	Candidate	Votes	%
Labour	D.B. Hoodless*	987	
Labour	R.C. Mabey*	938	
Labour	A. Pedrick	910	
Liberal	R.G. Adams	361	
Conservative	M.D.M. Berkin	270	
Liberal	Mrs N. Heigham	270	
Liberal	R.E. Sanderson	266	
Conservative	J.R. Humber	265	
Conservative	R.H. Embleton	259	
Communist	Mrs M. Betteridge	184	
Registered electors		6,311	
Turnout			30.9
Labour hold			
Labour hold			
Labour hold			

=== St Peter ===
St Peter (3)
Party	Candidate	Votes	%
Labour	Mrs A.L. Page	1,229	
Labour	M.P. Reynolds	1,152	
Labour	A.E. Smith*	1,115	
Independent Liberal	T.J.M. Voelcker	526	
Conservative	F.A. Falk	441	
Conservative	J.R. Rush	390	
Conservative	W.G.M. Shipley	380	
Liberal	J.P. Hudson	357	
Liberal	H.W. Bray	355	
Communist	E.C. Archer	99	
Registered electors		7,525	
Turnout			29.4
Labour hold			
Labour hold			
Labour hold			

=== Station ===
Station (2)
Party	Candidate	Votes	%
Labour	A. G. Smith	651	
Labour	A. Carty*	643	
Conservative	K. N. Baxendale	92	
Turnout			
Labour hold			
Labour hold			

=== Thornhill ===
Thornhill (3)
Party	Candidate	Votes	%
Labour	Mrs A.T. MacDonald	725	
Labour	A. Baker	712	
Labour	L. Gerrans	698	
Conservative	T.P. Kelly	256	
Conservative	H.J.H. Pearson	238	
Conservative	F. Philpott	233	
Communist	Miss M. Foy	50	
Registered electors		5,720	
Turnout			19.4
Labour hold			
Labour hold			
Labour hold			
