= New Liberal =

1960s UK political group

New Liberal was a party description used by Alan Ernest Lomas (14 June 1918 – 25 January 2016) and his supporters, who were based in the London Borough of Islington in the 1960s. Despite the name, this was a racist and far right organisation.

== Inception ==
By occupation, Lomas was an electrician and then an electrical engineer, and he had been an Electrical Trades Union shop steward. Lomas had been a Labour Party member until not long after the Second World War, when he left because he disagreed with nationalisation. Lomas joined the Conservative Party at the time of the Suez Crisis in 1956; and he had been a Conservative candidate for Islington Borough Council in 1959.

From December 1961 onwards, Lomas set up an organisation in East Islington as part of the then locally-dormant Liberal Party. The London Liberal Party repudiated Lomas and five others who stood as 'Liberal' candidates in the May 1962 borough elections.

In November 1962, Lomas was ousted from his office as organiser and agent of the East Islington Liberal Association. The vote for his removal was 28 for, and 20 against. Following a protracted struggle, the New Liberals emerged as a separate organisation.

Evan Hawken, Chairman of the London Liberal Party, wrote to the North London Press on 30 November 1962, setting out the political differences between Lomas and mainstream Liberal policy. The four key issues were defence, industrial relations, the Common Market, and immigration. Hawken coutlined the differences as follows:

- Defence: Lomas had published a pamphlet arguing that Britain must never give up her independent means of defence. The Liberal Party said 'Britain should abandon her Bomb in favour of a joint Western Deterrent under NATO’.
- Industrial relations: Lomas wanted unofficial strikes and the closed shop to be made unlawful. The Liberal Party by contrast pursued a voluntary approach to trade union reform.
- Common Market: Lomas wanted Britain to go into the EEC with the Commonwealth together. Not Liberal policy - and ‘impossible and unworkable’.
- Immigration: Lomas had stated that nobody should be allowed in until they are able to support themselves. No entitlement to welfare without three years’ residence. Hawken's comment was,‘This is most illiberal’.

== Analysis ==
The journalist Paul Foot wrote that when Lomas and his group formed the New Liberal Party,

The choice of name was shrewd, for it disassociated him immediately from any unfashionable extremist party. The word ‘liberal’, after all, conjures up in the British mind all that is good, honest and decent in politics.

Although Lomas kept up a pretence of fighting on a broad political front, immigration was the only issue which really interested him. His journal, the Viewpoint and Islington Advertiser, a semi-literate sheet notably similar to British National Party propaganda, deals almost exclusively with immigration, rats, dysentery, overcrowding, and the 'Defence of England’. Describing the people of Islington in their overcrowded houses, it jibes: ‘Perhaps if they were not English, the Labour Council would help.’

Looking back, former MP and Liberal Party insider Michael Meadowcroft branded Lomas as 'far right and racist', and wrote that

Lomas cleverly latched on to the generous benefits of the 'Liberal' description while propagating wholly illiberal views. Lomas was eventually expelled from the party but carried his acolytes into an Islington East 'New Liberal' Association. At the subsequent Liberal Assembly, he managed to sneak into the conference hall during the lunch break. Party officials, including Frank Byers, fearful of a public scene, were all for leaving him there but, as Chief Steward, I was having none of it, being sure that he would try and intervene in the proceedings. I went over to where he was sitting and said firmly, "You - out, now!" To my surprise, and relief, he complied immediately and we heard no more of him.

== The New Liberals and elections ==
When Lomas and his team stood as Liberal candidates in Highbury Ward in May 1962, ‘Lomas's campaign platform had conflated the issues of commonwealth immigration and the housing problem’. The North London Press noted, ‘Mr Lomas, in an election statement claims that some tenants in Islington are being intimidated by immigrant landlords’

The New Liberals ran three candidates for the three Islington-wide seats in the 1964 Greater London Council election; and they took more votes than the official Liberal candidates.

The New Liberals stood 19 candidates in the first London Borough of Islington council election in 1964, running a full slate of candidates in five of the multi-member wards.

Lomas stood as the New Liberal parliamentary candidate for Islington East in 1964 and 1966. His vote was 2,053 (7.59%) in 1964, and 1,127 (4.35%) in 1966. In 1970, he stood in Islington South-West and took 1,161 votes (5.49%).

In the classic academic study of the 1964 General Election, Lomas was bracketed alongside John Bean of the British National Party (1960) in Southall, and the Independent Colin Atkins in Deptford as one of ‘the three London candidates, in Southall, Deptford and Islington East, who under different labels, fought on avowedly anti-immigrant platforms’.Note that Lomas was seen as anti-immigrant, and not just anti-immigration.

Nicholas Deakin wrote of the 1964 campaign that Lomas professed as his main objective ’In our lifetime Great Britain into SPACE with automation for all’, but in fact he ‘concentrated very largely on the immigration issue and in particular Labour's attitude’.

The New Liberals also ran three candidates in Islington at the Greater London Council elections of 1964, 1967 and 1970. In 1967 the name Islington Tenants and Ratepayers Political Association was used, but in 1970 these were New Liberal candidates.

== Work outside Islington, and far right links ==
In June 1964, The Norwood News reported that the Clapham Radical Liberal Association, which had split from the Liberal Party because of opposition to the Common Market, had united their efforts with the New Liberals of Islington; and 'the new organisation will be called the New Liberals and is representative of the new members of the Liberal Party'. Dr David Russell was to stand for Parliament in Clapham as a New Liberal. In the event, this arrangement fell through, and Dr. Russell stood in Clapham as a Radical Liberal instead.

By 1965, Lomas was close to the small, nationalistic and anti immigrant Patriotic Party (UK) of former Liberal election candidate Major Arthur Braybrooke, who claimed that at the next election, his party would 'have the support of the New Liberals, with whose policies the Patriotic Party is in sympathy’. In 1966, Braybrooke claimed that his party ‘now has the support of the New Liberals under Mr Alan Lomas, and the League of Empire Loyalists’

The New Liberals turned against the Liberal Party in particular, distributing posters and leaflets at the Hove, Leyton, Erith & Crayford, and Hull North by-elections in 1965 and 1966, seeking to dissuade people from voting Liberal, and calling out ‘the present top Liberals’ as ‘vague and bigoted’. ‘Two carloads from the South’ went up to Hull to campaign against the Liberal by-election candidate.

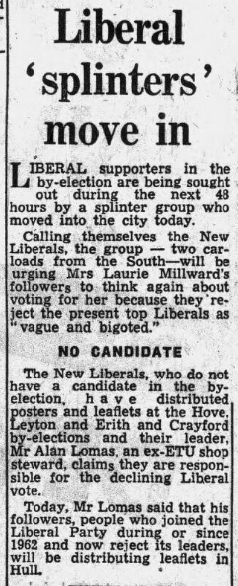
Hull Daily Mail, 24 January 1966

== 1970s and 1980s ==
Lomas and his first wife Elsie stood as 'Liberal' candidates in a double (two-seat) by-election for the Barnsbury Ward of Islington Borough Council in 1973. They were opposed by candidates using the description 'Official Liberal'.

Lomas and his second wife Valerie were 'Independent SDP' candidates for Thornhill Ward in the 1982 Islington Borough Council elections. They were opposed by Liberal Party and Social Democratic Party (UK) candidates, as part of the Liberal-SDP Alliance.

== Alan Lomas in Stroud ==
In later life, Lomas moved to Stroud, Gloucestershire, in 1979.

In 2004, Lomas was a UKIP candidate for the Nailsworth Ward on Stroud District Council.

Lomas stood as a British National Party candidate for Nailsworth in the 2008 Stroud District Council election. Lomas left the BNP in 2009 because "The party is divided between the ancient and the modern. Whereas I support some aspects of their policies, others are way out of date and unacceptable."

Lomas was an Independent candidate for Stroud at the 2010 United Kingdom general election advocating a referendum on EU membership, reviews of NHS middle management, and stricter immigration controls. At the age of 91, he was thought to be oldest candidate in the entire election. Lomas died in Gloucester in 2016, aged 97.
