= 1986 Islington London Borough Council election =

1986 Local election in England

- 8 May 1986

All 52 council seats 27 seats needed for a majority
- Registered: 119,144
- Turnout: 47.1%
	First party	Second party	Third party
Party	Labour	Alliance	Conservative
Seats before	40	2	0
Seats after	36	16	0
Seat change	▼4	▲14	Steady
Popular vote	66,679	48,491	19,156
Percentage	48.26%	35.09%	13.87%
Council control before election
Labour
Council control after election
Labour

The 1986 Islington Council election took place on 8 May 1986 to elect members of Islington London Borough Council in London, England. The whole council was up for election and the Labour party stayed in overall control of the council.

== Election result ==
1986 Islington London Borough Council election
Party	Seats	Gains	Losses	Net gain/loss	Seats %	Votes %	Votes	+/−
Labour	36	10	14	▼4	69.23	48.26	66,679	
Alliance	16	14	0	▲14	30.77	35.09	48,491	
Conservative	0	0	0	Steady	0.00	13.87	19,156	
Green	0	0	0	Steady	0.00	2.60	3,599	
Communist	0	0	0	Steady	0.00	0.10	138	
Revolutionary Communist	0	0	0	Steady	0.00	0.04	58	
Humanist	0	0	0	Steady	0.00	0.03	37	
Total	52						138,158	

== Ward results ==
(*) - Represents an incumbent Councillor

(†) - Represents a councillor who has swapped wards

=== Barnsbury ===
Barnsbury (3)
Party	Candidate	Votes	%
Alliance	George A. Lambillion*	1,659	
Alliance	Ann Brennan	1,507	
Alliance	Christopher Mularczyk	1,498	
Labour	Alexander J. Farrell*	1,291	
Labour	Derek R. Hines	1,264	
Labour	John A. Worker	1,178	
Conservative	Reginald H. Brown	260	
Conservative	Neil D. Kerr	240	
Green	Caroline M. Clayton	212	
Conservative	Mark A.H. Rittner	204	
Communist	John W. Jones	138	
Registered electors		6,484	
Turnout			52.5
Alliance hold			
Alliance gain from Labour			
Alliance gain from Labour			

=== Bunhill ===
Bunhill (3)
Party	Candidate	Votes	%
Alliance	Joseph R. Trotter	1,371	
Alliance	Jonathon P. Smith	1,311	
Labour	Terence J. Herbert*	1,272	
Labour	Christopher T. Calnan*	1,264	
Alliance	Peter Loizos	1,181	
Labour	Margaret L. Oliver	1,179	
Conservative	Arthur H.S. Hull	473	
Conservative	Nicholas B. Baile	445	
Conservative	Louise E. Bush	441	
Green	Christopher Ashby	118	
Registered electors		7,387	
Turnout			45.6
Alliance gain from Labour			
Alliance gain from Labour			
Labour hold			

=== Canonbury East ===
Canonbury East (2)
Party	Candidate	Votes	%
Alliance	James Doyle	1,101	
Alliance	Doris L.R. Allen	1,026	
Labour	Philip J. Kelly	1,010	
Labour	Teresa E. Seabourne	870	
Conservative	Robinn J. Cave	255	
Conservative	James A. Rooke	214	
Green	Rosemary Guest	82	
Registered electors		4,915	
Turnout			50.7
Alliance gain from Labour			
Alliance gain from Labour			

=== Canonbury West ===
Canonbury West (2)
Party	Candidate	Votes	%
Labour	Thomas J.W. Simpson	964	
Labour	Howard L. Mann	955	
Alliance	Trevor J. Davies	910	
Alliance	Jennifer A. Durlacher	867	
Conservative	Alan N. Spinney	487	
Conservative	Margaret D. Reese	464	
Green	Keith F. Towse	68	
Registered electors		4,681	
Turnout			53.6
Labour hold			
Labour gain from Labour Co-op			

=== Clerkenwell ===
Clerkenwell (3)
Party	Candidate	Votes	%
Alliance	David Hymns	1,990	
Alliance	Gerald D. Southgate	1,743	
Alliance	Sandra J. Brenner	1,739	
Labour	Paul Matthews	1,271	
Labour	Nicole E. Bishop	1,215	
Labour	Ian S. Wilson	1,046	
Conservative	Donald W. Bromfield	442	
Conservative	Rita Bromfield	376	
Conservative	Elizabeth M. Carlson	311	
Green	Elizabeth J. Arundel	190	
Registered electors		7,490	
Turnout			49.3
Alliance gain from Labour			
Alliance gain from Labour			
Alliance hold			

=== Gillespie ===
Gillespie (2)
Party	Candidate	Votes	%
Labour	Diane L. Burridge	1,242	
Labour	Bob Crossman†	1,196	
Alliance	Hilary J. Chell	400	
Conservative	Andrew G. Dekany	368	
Alliance	Charles M.W. Husbands	363	
Conservative	Adrianne L. Price-Thomas	353	
Green	Richard T. Halvorsen	208	
Registered electors		4,312	
Turnout			51.5
Labour hold			
Labour hold			

=== Highbury ===
Highbury (3)
Party	Candidate	Votes	%
Labour	Peter A. Broadbent*	1,514	
Labour	Michael J. Devenney	1,407	
Labour	Kevin S. Arthurs	1,369	
Alliance	William K. Harding	963	
Alliance	Stephen Hitchins	920	
Alliance	Patricia A. Tuson	905	
Conservative	Colin T. Dancer	426	
Conservative	Elizabeth B. Edmunds	408	
Conservative	Simon R. Matthews	398	
Green	Katharine L. Wicksteed	224	
Registered electors		6,672	
Turnout			45.8
Labour hold			
Labour hold			
Labour gain from Labour Co-op			

=== Highview ===
Highview (2)
Party	Candidate	Votes	%
Labour	Maureen M. Leigh*	936	
Labour	Valda L. James	872	
Alliance	Anthony D. Fenton	282	
Alliance	Joanne E. Michie	275	
Conservative	Clive D. Blackwood	198	
Conservative	Lucia G. Christodoulides	179	
Green	Roger B. Whitney	86	
Registered electors		3,640	
Turnout			43.4
Labour hold			
Labour hold			

=== Hillmarton ===
Hillmarton (2)
Party	Candidate	Votes	%
Labour	Arthur L. Bell*	1,043	
Labour	Janet H. Norden	973	
Alliance	Francis Vincent	645	
Alliance	Rosemary M. Caudwell	610	
Conservative	Oliver C. Carruthers	398	
Conservative	Roy P.C. Taft	337	
Green	Robert W. Latimer	115	
Registered electors		4,888	
Turnout			46.9
Labour hold			
Labour hold			

=== Hillrise ===
Hillrise (3)
Party	Candidate	Votes	%
Labour	Alan M. Clinton*	1,757	
Labour	Milton K. Babulall*	1,546	
Labour	Diana Coles	1,514	
Alliance	Geoffrey Hubbard	573	
Alliance	Daniel J.M. Janner	544	
Alliance	Sarah A. Ludford	522	
Conservative	Michael Dipre	413	
Conservative	Kenneth Hynes	389	
Conservative	Alexander B.G. Moody	338	
Green	Robin M. Macleod	187	
Registered electors		6.974	
Turnout			41.4
Labour hold			
Labour gain from Labour Co-op			
Labour hold			

=== Holloway ===
Holloway (3)
Party	Candidate	Votes	%
Labour	Rosemary Dale*	1,377	
Labour	Norman R. Beddington	1,254	
Labour	David L. Yorath*	1,164	
Alliance	Patrick McCann	1,006	
Alliance	Simon P. Bryceson	932	
Alliance	Margot J. Dunn	919	
Conservative	Noel T. Farrow	352	
Conservative	Andrew J. McHallam	328	
Conservative	Rene Y.L. Wong	318	
Green	Andrew R. Myer	147	
Registered electors		6,490	
Turnout			45.3
Labour hold			
Labour hold			
Labour hold			

=== Junction ===
Junction (3)
Party	Candidate	Votes	%
Labour	Maurice J. Barnes	1,813	
Labour	Candy Atherton	1,748	
Labour	Taha T. Karim	1,669	
Alliance	Patricia A. Julian	600	
Alliance	Stephen G. Cope	594	
Conservative	David J. Nicholson	545	
Alliance	Errol R. Smalley	523	
Conservative	Kingsley G. Manning	516	
Conservative	Nigel P.G. Boardman	491	
Green	Mary H. Adshead	206	
Registered electors		6,376	
Turnout			48.3
Labour hold			
Labour gain from Labour Co-op			
Labour gain from Labour Co-op			

=== Mildmay ===
Mildmay (3)
Party	Candidate	Votes	%
Labour	Patrick E. Haynes*	1,720	
Labour	Ayse Hasan	1,616	
Labour	Derek A. Sawyer	1,529	
Alliance	Anthony B.T. Davey	910	
Alliance	Sylvia M.L. Jones	890	
Alliance	Gretelmay A. Berent	874	
Conservative	Richard F. Hewitt	632	
Conservative	Margaret A. McCabe	575	
Conservative	Mahendra S. Oza	512	
Green	Sheila Freeman	334	
Registered electors		8,322	
Turnout			41.9
Labour hold			
Labour hold			
Labour gain from Labour Co-op			

=== Quadrant ===
Quadrant (2)
Party	Candidate	Votes	%
Labour	David P. Barnes	1,111	
Labour	Anne Green	995	
Alliance	Mary I. Campbell	908	
Alliance	Doris K.A. Rogers	852	
Conservative	William D. Thomas	491	
Conservative	Jennifer Moody	484	
Green	Adrian R. Williams	123	
Registered electors		5,330	
Turnout			49.6
Labour hold			
Labour gain from Labour Co-op			

=== St George's ===
St George's (3)
Party	Candidate	Votes	%
Labour	Peter B.H. Rees	1,480	
Labour	Chris Adamson	1,444	
Labour	Peter J. Murray	1,391	
Alliance	John W. Bryan	658	
Alliance	Shamshad Cockcroft	616	
Alliance	Andrew J.H. Stevens	615	
Conservative	Kenneth E.J. Graham	531	
Conservative	Thomas Ramsey	488	
Conservative	Andrew W. Savage	463	
Green	Robert K. Turner	315	
Registered electors		6,866	
Turnout			42.9
Labour hold			
Labour hold			
Labour hold			

=== St Mary's ===
St Mary (3)
Party	Candidate	Votes	%
Alliance	Richard M.H. Heseltine	1,165	
Alliance	Jeffrey Kelson	1,112	
Alliance	Pier M. Herbert	1,107	
Labour	Damien F.J. Welfare	1,014	
Labour	Paul E. Convery	1,012	
Labour	William S. Young	1,005	
Conservative	Mark Eldridge	370	
Conservative	Mary M. Fagg	347	
Conservative	Hugo H. Summerson	323	
Green	Helen Bailey	178	
Humanist	Mitchel B. Wicking	37	
Registered electors		5,546	
Turnout			50.2
Alliance gain from Labour			
Alliance gain from Labour			
Alliance gain from Labour			

=== St Peter ===
St Peter (3)
Party	Candidate	Votes	%
Alliance	Maria Powell	1.613	
Alliance	Christopher J. Pryce	1,610	
Alliance	Eileen F. Czwartos	1,491	
Labour	George R. Hayes	1,142	
Labour	Clive Jackson	1,064	
Labour	Andrew Bosi	1,028	
Conservative	Leonard A. Hatcher	358	
Conservative	Charles A. Micklewright	343	
Conservative	Sarah G.M. Ross Goobey	271	
Green	Paula V. Neuss	183	
Registered electors		6,574	
Turnout			49.2
Alliance gain from Labour			
Alliance gain from Labour			
Alliance gain from Labour			

=== Sussex ===
Sussex (2)
Party	Candidate	Votes	%
Labour	Margaret Hodge	1,209	
Labour	Christopher M.B. King	1,156	
Alliance	Howard Hyman	272	
Alliance	Eleftherios Georgoulas	240	
Conservative	Nigel V.A. Shervey	229	
Conservative	Elizabeth M. Stephens	206	
Green	Ann C. Wainwright	102	
Revolutionary Communist	Edward Branigan	58	
Registered electors		4,312	
Turnout			44.4
Labour gain from Labour Co-op			
Labour gain from Labour Co-op			

=== Thornhill ===
Thornhill (2)
Party	Candidate	Votes	%
Labour	Charles H. Chapman	1,130	
Labour	Saly E.A. Gilbert	1,027	
Alliance	Robert M. Bayliss	762	
Alliance	Patricia M. Peel	713	
Conservative	Stephen A. Kreppel	159	
Conservative	Irene Moore	157	
Green	Philip R. Lewis	79	
Registered electors		4,632	
Turnout			48.6
Labour hold			
Labour hold			

=== Tollington ===
Tollington (3)
Party	Candidate	Votes	%
Labour	Sandra Marks	1,860	
Labour	Frank C. Mort	1,839	
Labour	Eddie D.S. Niles	1,734	
Alliance	Matthew T.M. Ryan	921	
Alliance	Christopher B.D. Smith	890	
Alliance	Mark C. Thatcher	793	
Conservative	Diana Harrison	318	
Conservative	Foula Dancer	273	
Conservative	David R. Starkey	261	
Green	Janet L. Anderson	258	
Registered electors		7,523	
Turnout			46.4
Labour hold			
Labour hold			
Labour gain from Labour Co-op			
