= 2026 Islington London Borough Council election =

2026 English local government election

- 7 May 2026

All 51 seats to Islington London Borough Council 26 seats needed for a majority
	First party	Second party
Leader	Una O'Halloran	Benali Hamdache
Party	Labour	Green
Last election	48 seats, 54.6%	3 seats, 22.4%
Seats won	32	19
Seat change	▼16	▲16
Popular vote	67,994	64,815
Percentage	40.0%	38.1%
Swing	▼14.2%	▲15.7%
Leader before election
Una O'Halloran
Labour
Leader after election
Una O'Halloran
Labour

The 2026 Islington London Borough Council election took place on 7 May 2026. All 51 members of Islington London Borough Council were elected. The elections took place alongside local elections in the other London boroughs and elections to local authorities across the United Kingdom.

Prior to the election, the council was under Labour majority control. At this election, they lost 16 seats to the Green Party, but retained their majority. No other party won seats at this election.

== Background ==
Labour held control of the council in 2022. In 2026, councillor Sara Hyde was appointed to the House of Lords.

== Previous council composition ==
After 2022 election		Before 2026 election		After 2026 election	
Party	Seats	Party	Seats	Party	Seats
Labour	48	Labour	44	Labour	32
Green	3	Green	3 (Note: Sit as part of the Independent and Green Group.)	Green	19
Independent	0	Independent	4	Independent	0

Changes 2022–2026:

- March 2023: Matt Nathan (Labour) leaves party to sit as an independent
- November 2023: Asima Shaikh (Labour) leaves party to sit as an independent
- March 2024: Dave Poyser (Labour) resigns – by-election held May 2024
- May 2024:
  - Ollie Steadman (Labour) wins by-election
  - Philip Graham (Labour) suspended from party
- July 2024:
  - Ollie Steadman (Labour) resigns – by-election held August 2024
  - Ilkay Cinko-Oner (Labour) leaves party to sit as an independent
- August 2024: Shreya Nanda (Labour) wins by-election
- October 2024: Kaya Comer-Schwartz (Labour) resigns – by-election held November 2024
- November 2024: James Potts (Labour) wins by-election

== Results summary ==
Council composition after the 2022 election

Council composition after the 2026 election

2026 Islington London Borough Council
Party	Seats	Gains	Losses	Net gain/loss	Seats %	Votes %	Votes	+/−
Labour	32	0	16	▼16	62.7	38.54	67,994	-16.06
Green	19	16	0	▲16	37.3	36.74	64,815	+14.64
Liberal Democrats	0	0	0	Steady	0.0	8.27	14,597	-3.43
Conservative	0	0	0	Steady	0.0	6.67	11,764	-4.53
Reform	0	0	0	Steady	0.0	6.14	10,832	N/A
Independent	0	0	0	Steady	0.0	1.98	3,496	+1.78
Islington Community Independents	0	0	0	Steady	0.0	1.57	2,768	N/A
National Housing Party	0	0	0	Steady	0.0	0.04	68	N/A
CPA	0	0	0	Steady	0.0	0.03	54	N/A
SDP	0	0	0	Steady	0.0	0.02	37	N/A
Other parties	0	0	0	Steady	0.0	0.00	0	-0.20

== Results by ward ==
=== Arsenal ===
Arsenal (3)
Party	Candidate	Votes	%	±%
Labour	Fin Craig*	1,622	42.5	▼12.7
Green	Patrick Brighty	1,600	41.9	▲14.1
Green	Nafisah Brown	1,599	41.9	▲20.2
Green	Jo Dowbor	1,574	41.2	▲22.3
Labour	Thomas Doherty	1,566	41.0	▼14.0
Labour	Bashir Ibrahim*	1,466	38.4	▼13.8
Liberal Democrats	Jean-Philippe Chenot	241	6.3	▼8.0
Reform	John Dunton-Downer	240	6.3	N/A
Reform	Ian MacKee	232	6.1	N/A
Conservative	Nicholas Bennett	223	5.8	▼4.1
Liberal Democrats	Philip Middleton	220	5.8	▼6.2
Reform	Harry Ripp	209	5.5	N/A
Liberal Democrats	Paul Massey	201	5.3	▼5.9
Conservative	Rachael Henry	199	5.2	▼4.5
Conservative	Mark Edwards	190	5.0	▼4.0
Independent	Carol Louvet	69	1.8	N/A
Turnout			46.1	+9.2
Labour hold		Swing		
Green gain from Labour		Swing	16.2	
Green gain from Labour		Swing	16.2	

=== Barnsbury ===
Barnsbury (3)
Party	Candidate	Votes	%	±%
Labour	Rowena Champion	1,615	46.7	▼10.6
Labour	Jilani Chowdhury	1,394	40.3	▼10.8
Labour	Kane Emerson	1,355	39.2	▼7.4
Green	Amelia Bottomley	1,168	33.8	▲8.6
Green	Sara Mulatu	1,041	30.1	▲15.7
Green	Lucas Waelbroeck Boix	982	28.4	▲14.9
Conservative	Oliver Teller	482	13.9	▼4.4
Reform	Francis O'Brien	480	13.9	N/A
Conservative	Christopher McCann	447	12.9	▼3.6
Liberal Democrats	Jeremy Hargreaves	395	11.4	▼3.4
Liberal Democrats	Michael Champness	394	11.4	▼2.9
Conservative	Zak Vora	342	9.9	▼6.4
Liberal Democrats	Erwann Le Lannou	284	8.2	▼3.6
Turnout			47.3	+10.2
Labour hold		Swing		
Labour hold		Swing		
Labour hold		Swing		

=== Bunhill ===
Bunhill (3)
Party	Candidate	Votes	%	±%
Labour	Valerie Bossman-Quarshie	1,091	45.4	▼16.1
Labour	Troy Gallagher	928	38.6	▼18.0
Labour	Kiran Prasad	909	37.8	▼13.1
Green	Alan Clark Gutierrez	739	30.7	▲12.3
Green	Ava Lie	660	27.5	▲13.8
Green	David Wade	496	20.6	▲10.5
Reform	David Small	390	16.2	▲13.7
Reform	Andrew Watson	372	15.5	N/A
Conservative	Sara Abey	270	11.2	▼7.1
Islington Community Independents	Phil Graham	262	10.9	N/A
Liberal Democrats	Susan Beveridge	259	10.8	▼1.3
Conservative	Paul Carr	212	8.8	▼7.4
Liberal Democrats	John Kenny	210	8.7	▼3.1
Liberal Democrats	George Allan	196	8.2	▼1.7
Conservative	David Shovel	179	7.4	▼8.8
SDP	Jake Painter	37	1.5	▼0.1
Turnout			37.7	+7.4
Labour hold		Swing		
Labour hold		Swing		
Labour hold		Swing		

=== Caledonian ===
Caledonian (3)
Party	Candidate	Votes	%	±%
Labour	Paul Convery	1,201	43.7	▼23.1
Labour	Una O'Halloran	1,179	42.9	▼23.1
Labour	Md Rahman	1,053	38.3	▼25.9
Green	Sadia Ali	978	35.6	▲20.7
Green	Bryony Carney	941	34.2	▲20.5
Green	Clara Luz	918	33.4	▲21.0
Reform	Paul Lovell	361	13.1	N/A
Reform	Chris Pitt	342	12.4	N/A
Reform	Liz Snaith	322	11.7	N/A
Liberal Democrats	Euan Cameron	188	6.8	▼2.2
Conservative	Pete Backhouse	177	6.4	▼6.4
Conservative	Alex Challoner	165	6.0	▼6.3
Liberal Democrats	Walera Martynchyk	148	5.4	▼3.6
Liberal Democrats	Edward Mitford	142	5.2	▼2.6
Conservative	Harrison Woodin-Lygo	135	4.9	▼6.2
Turnout			42.0	+10.0
Labour hold		Swing		
Labour hold		Swing		
Labour hold		Swing		

=== Canonbury ===
Canonbury (3)
Party	Candidate	Votes	%	±%
Labour	Clare Jeapes*	1,343	39.6	▼14.8
Labour	Nick Wayne*	1,210	35.6	▼13.2
Green	Hayden Banks	1,207	35.6	▲17.3
Labour	John Woolf*	1,169	34.4	▼12.9
Green	Jorge Latter	1,131	33.3	▲15.5
Green	Chris Radway	1,108	32.6	▲18.7
Reform	Jason Corke	457	13.5	N/A
Reform	Laurence Glazier	427	12.6	N/A
Reform	Tessa Rawcliffe	421	12.4	N/A
Liberal Democrats	James Bacchus	321	9.5	▼6.4
Liberal Democrats	Barbara Smith	302	8.9	▼5.8
Liberal Democrats	Henry McMorrow	287	8.5	▼5.7
Conservative	Michael Chissick	241	7.1	▼11.7
Conservative	Haiwei Li	194	5.7	▼12.5
Conservative	Manuel Benito	191	5.6	▼12.1
Independent	Julliet Makhapila	97	2.9	N/A
Independent	Belinda Ackermann	78	2.3	N/A
Turnout			41.6	+7.8
Labour hold		Swing		
Labour hold		Swing		
Green gain from Labour		Swing	15.4	

=== Clerkenwell ===
Clerkenwell (3)
Party	Candidate	Votes	%	±%
Green	Jara Falkenburg	1,146	42.7	▲23.8
Labour	Ruth Hayes*	1,141	42.5	▼11.6
Green	Giulio Ferrini	1,073	40.0	▲21.9
Labour	Andrew Clark	1,047	39.0	▼9.4
Green	Martin Murray	969	36.1	▲22.5
Labour	Ben Mackmurdie*	949	35.3	▼12.7
Liberal Democrats	Kevin Chun	404	15.0	▼3.3
Liberal Democrats	Alessandro Bonetti	403	15.0	▼1.7
Reform	Bill Cove	379	14.1	N/A
Reform	Martine Paulmier	372	13.9	N/A
Liberal Democrats	Jason Vickers	337	12.5	▼3.7
Conservative	Karen Hutchinson	239	8.9	▼7.4
Conservative	Alexander Lusty	213	7.9	▼8.3
Conservative	Mark Eldridge	141	5.3	▼9.9
National Housing Party	Grant Shimmen	68	2.5	N/A
Turnout			43.9	+10.2
Green gain from Labour		Swing	17.1	
Labour hold		Swing		
Green gain from Labour		Swing	17.1	

=== Finsbury Park ===
Finsbury Park (3)
Party	Candidate	Votes	%	±%
Green	Caroline Allen	1,288	36.4	▲15.9
Green	Syreen Hassan	1,211	34.2	▲15.6
Labour	Mick O'Sullivan*	1,194	33.7	▼34.9
Labour	Gulcin Ozdemir	1,175	33.2	▼34.1
Green	Natalie Koffman	1,113	31.4	▲15.7
Labour	Portia Msimang	1,104	31.2	▼30.9
Independent	Sadiq Yusuf	763	21.5	N/A
Independent	Sharon Matthew	636	18.0	N/A
Islington Community Independents	Amu Gib	569	16.1	N/A
Reform	Jonathan Lang	253	7.1	N/A
Reform	Angela Nicolaou	248	7.0	N/A
Liberal Democrats	Amelia Mitford	217	6.1	▼2.5
Conservative	Stephen McMinnies	180	5.1	▼0.8
Liberal Democrats	Daniel Thomas	177	5.0	▼1.9
Conservative	Chris Williams	177	5.0	▼0.9
Conservative	Pauline Lewis	169	4.8	▼0.8
Liberal Democrats	Edwin Smith	148	4.2	▼0.7
Turnout			42.3	+10.4
Green gain from Labour		Swing	25.2	
Green gain from Labour		Swing	25.2	
Labour hold		Swing		

=== Highbury ===
Highbury (3)
Party	Candidate	Votes	%	±%
Green	Benali Hamdache*	2,090	47.9	▼4.6
Green	Talia Hussain	2,016	46.2	▲1.7
Green	Jon Robert Nott	1,857	42.6	▲1.1
Labour	Alastair Harper	1,481	34.0	▼2.2
Labour	Michael Comba	1,468	33.7	▼1.0
Labour	Tahreen Dewan	1,422	32.6	▲1.1
Liberal Democrats	Julia Williams	417	9.6	▼2.4
Conservative	Eileen Gallagher	377	8.6	▼0.2
Liberal Democrats	Rowan James	370	8.5	▼3.0
Reform	Joseph Wisepart	354	8.1	N/A
Conservative	Philip Kelvin	338	7.8	▼1.0
Liberal Democrats	Paul Symes	319	7.3	▼2.1
Independent	Andrew Somerset	309	7.1	N/A
Conservative	Carlien Sai	260	6.0	▼2.7
Turnout			49.6	+4.9
Green hold		Swing		
Green hold		Swing		
Green hold		Swing		

=== Hillrise ===
Hillrise (3)
Party	Candidate	Votes	%	±%
Labour	Shreya Nanda	1,732	41.5	▼24.8
Labour	Michelline Safi-Ngongo	1,594	38.2	▼28.0
Labour	Marian Spall	1,526	36.5	▼29.2
Green	Mimi Johnson	1,362	32.6	▲9.9
Green	Greg Foxsmith	1,316	31.5	▲12.6
Green	Liam Jones	1,230	29.5	▲11.8
Independent	Alison Stoecker	523	12.5	N/A
Liberal Democrats	Philip Hayden	380	9.1	▼1.3
Liberal Democrats	Imogen Wall	361	8.6	▲0.4
Liberal Democrats	Jason Devaney	348	8.3	▲4.5
Independent	Rupert Wilkinson	328	7.9	N/A
Islington Community Independents	Callum Waterhouse	320	7.7	N/A
Reform	Robert Drummond	305	7.3	N/A
Reform	Jan Manderson	271	6.5	N/A
Conservative	Daniel Cohen	264	6.3	▼0.5
Conservative	David Lewis	213	5.1	▼1.7
Independent	Vicky Laker	212	5.1	N/A
Conservative	William Howard	190	4.5	▼1.9
CPA	Nancy Momoh	54	1.3	N/A
Turnout			44.5	+8.1
Labour hold		Swing		
Labour hold		Swing		
Labour hold		Swing		

=== Holloway ===
Holloway (3)
Party	Candidate	Votes	%	±%
Labour	Jason Jackson	1,505	48.5	▼16.4
Labour	Claire Zammit	1,495	48.1	▼16.2
Labour	Joe Peck	1,330	42.8	▼19.6
Green	Claire Poyner	1,040	33.5	▲15.0
Green	Andrew Myer	1,007	32.4	▲13.9
Green	Ahmed Jaffer	978	31.5	▲19.2
Reform	Christopher Nicholas-Cavendish	351	11.3	N/A
Liberal Democrats	Bridget Fox	269	8.7	▼2.5
Conservative	Michael Scott	236	7.6	▼2.3
Conservative	Claudine Knight	221	7.1	▼1.8
Conservative	Nigel Watts	175	5.6	▼2.9
Liberal Democrats	David Kelly	170	5.5	▼3.7
Liberal Democrats	Tim Johnson	163	5.2	▼3.2
Islington Community Independents	Nathaniel Jones	150	4.8	N/A
Islington Community Independents	Anahita Zardoshti	149	4.8	N/A
Independent	George Papadopoullos	78	2.5	N/A
Turnout			43.8	+8.1
Labour hold		Swing		
Labour hold		Swing		
Labour hold		Swing		

=== Junction ===
Junction (3)
Party	Candidate	Votes	%	±%
Labour	Sheila Chapman	1,544	44.2	▼23.8
Labour	James Potts	1,348	38.6	▼25.9
Labour	Benjamin Gregg	1,319	37.7	▼26.7
Green	Florence Pollock	1,197	34.2	▲9.7
Green	Leon Graham	1,182	33.8	▲16.2
Green	Jaro Kubiak	988	28.3	▲12.0
Islington Community Independents	Ruth O'Dowd	354	10.1	N/A
Reform	John Clarke	328	9.4	N/A
Reform	Georgia Smith	302	8.6	N/A
Reform	Shaun O'Kane	296	8.5	N/A
Islington Community Independents	Faith Obiaka-Hayward	287	8.2	N/A
Islington Community Independents	Pat Prendergast	267	7.6	N/A
Conservative	Nicholas Brainsby	206	5.9	▼3.1
Liberal Democrats	Helen Redesdale	206	5.9	▼1.8
Conservative	Oliver Bandosz	184	5.3	▼2.8
Liberal Democrats	Ufi Ibrahim	170	4.9	▼1.3
Liberal Democrats	Caspar Woolley	168	4.8	▼1.1
Conservative	Sacha Varma	141	4.0	▼3.7
Turnout			42.4	+7.1
Labour hold		Swing		
Labour hold		Swing		
Labour hold		Swing		

=== Laycock ===
Laycock (3)
Party	Candidate	Votes	%	±%
Labour	Maia Hamilton	1,245	41.4	▼17.7
Labour	Heather Staff	1,210	40.2	▼18.2
Labour	Nurullah Turan	1,149	38.2	▼16.6
Green	Joy Hinson	1,137	37.8	▲15.8
Green	Rasan Naji	890	29.6	▲11.2
Green	Joseph Walker	847	28.2	▲14.0
Islington Community Independents	Ilkay Cinko-Oner	410	13.6	N/A
Reform	Cheryl Rands	387	12.9	N/A
Conservative	Andrew Harrison	308	10.2	▼3.2
Conservative	Margaret Joseph	267	8.9	▼4.5
Liberal Democrats	Sakina Chenot	262	8.7	▼3.7
Liberal Democrats	Matthew Dendy	246	8.2	▼2.8
Liberal Democrats	Patricia Peel	242	8.0	▼1.9
Conservative	Simon Toms	239	7.9	▼5.1
Independent	John Doherty	92	3.1	N/A
Independent	Andrew Parry	88	2.9	N/A
Turnout			40.5	+7.4
Labour hold		Swing		
Labour gain from Independent		Swing		
Labour hold		Swing		

=== Mildmay ===
Mildmay (3)
Party	Candidate	Votes	%	±%
Green	Sophia Brown	1,885	49.8	▲25.0
Green	Jackson Caines	1,637	43.3	▲25.1
Green	Carlos Valero	1,593	42.1	▲25.8
Labour	Jenny Kay*	1,542	40.8	▼21.5
Labour	Santiago Bell-Bradford*	1,407	37.2	▼23.0
Labour	Angelo Weekes*	1,308	34.6	▼20.6
Reform	Emma Smith	268	7.1	N/A
Reform	Paul Piacenti	267	7.1	N/A
Liberal Democrats	Nadine Mellor	234	6.2	▼4.6
Conservative	Thomas Hamilton	231	6.1	▼5.1
Conservative	John Wilkin	228	6.0	▼4.4
Conservative	Alyson Prince	227	6.0	▼4.0
Liberal Democrats	John Cotton	218	5.8	▼4.7
Liberal Democrats	Percy De Vries	185	4.9	▼5.2
Independent	Ray Alcock	118	3.1	N/A
Turnout			43.3	+9.6
Green gain from Labour		Swing	23.3	
Green gain from Labour		Swing	23.3	
Green gain from Labour		Swing	23.3	

=== St Mary's & St James' ===
St Mary's & St James' (3)
Party	Candidate	Votes	%	±%
Labour	Hannah McHugh	1,298	39.1	▼3.8
Labour	Joseph Croft	1,223	36.8	▼3.0
Labour	Saiqa Pandor	1,189	35.8	▼2.5
Green	Christopher Allen-Procter	989	29.8	▲12.8
Green	Jackie Kay	878	26.4	▲13.6
Liberal Democrats	Kate Pothalingam	842	25.4	▼9.5
Green	Solveig Herzum	815	24.5	▲14.7
Liberal Democrats	Rebecca Jones	774	23.3	▼7.2
Liberal Democrats	Terry Stacy	734	22.1	▼7.8
Reform	Michael King	396	11.9	N/A
Conservative	Jonathan Horsman	276	8.3	▼7.4
Conservative	Simon Johnson	274	8.3	▼6.6
Conservative	Alexandra Eldridge	167	5.0	▼8.5
Independent	Brian Potter	105	3.2	N/A
Turnout			46.0	+4.8
Labour hold		Swing		
Labour hold		Swing		
Labour hold		Swing		

=== St Peter's & Canalside ===
St Peter's & Canalside (3)
Party	Candidate	Votes	%	±%
Labour	Martin Klute	1,193	44.6	▼6.2
Labour	Toby North	1,166	43.6	▼5.3
Labour	Rosaline Ogunro	1,147	42.9	▼5.7
Green	Bronwen Jones	790	29.6	▲15.0
Green	Alexander Gordon	774	29.0	▲15.1
Green	John Sloboda	670	25.1	▲12.6
Reform	Thomas Hartley	440	16.5	N/A
Conservative	Vanessa Carson	380	14.2	▼8.6
Conservative	Jack Gilmore	368	13.8	▼7.9
Liberal Democrats	Simon Groom	306	11.5	▼7.1
Liberal Democrats	Edward Jenkyns	274	10.3	▼4.5
Conservative	James Mathieson	262	9.8	▼11.8
Liberal Democrats	Martin Lunnon	247	9.2	▼2.1
Turnout			39.6	+6.5
Labour hold		Swing		
Labour hold		Swing		
Labour hold		Swing		

=== Tollington ===
Tollington (3)
Party	Candidate	Votes	%	±%
Green	Elmedina Baptista-Mendes	2,262	51.0	▲19.7
Green	Jonathan Ward	2,138	48.2	▲25.7
Green	Alex Nettle	2,133	48.1	▲27.2
Labour	Flora Williamson*	1,663	37.5	▼25.6
Labour	Mick Gilgunn*	1,618	36.5	▼25.0
Labour	Anjna Khurana*	1,610	36.3	▼23.0
Reform	Andrew Brown	285	6.4	N/A
Reform	Kevin Jones	271	6.1	N/A
Liberal Democrats	Lidia Erlichman	229	5.2	▼3.2
Reform	Sasha Cuthbert	208	4.7	N/A
Liberal Democrats	Keith Sharp	208	4.7	▼2.8
Conservative	Kevin O'Neill	179	4.0	▼2.5
Conservative	Nigel Seay	144	3.2	▼3.1
Liberal Democrats	Paul Smith	143	3.2	▼3.7
Conservative	Abbas Fatah	137	3.1	▼2.9
Turnout			48.5	+12.3
Green gain from Labour		Swing	22.7	
Green gain from Labour		Swing	22.7	
Green gain from Labour		Swing	22.7	

=== Tufnell Park ===
Tufnell Park (3)
Party	Candidate	Votes	%	±%
Green	Sophia Andersson-Gylden	2,106	50.7	▲8.1
Green	Devon Osborne	2,052	49.4	▲7.8
Green	Sheridan Kates	2,014	48.5	▲11.5
Labour	Satnam Gill*	1,653	39.8	▼13.3
Labour	Jenevieve Treadwell	1,466	35.3	▼14.8
Labour	Buffy Sharpe	1,432	34.5	▼11.3
Reform	Paul Smith	300	7.2	N/A
Reform	Dominic Rayner	298	7.2	N/A
Liberal Democrats	Susan Atkinson	235	5.7	▲0.3
Liberal Democrats	Axel Koelsch	222	5.3	0.0
Conservative	Margaret Currie	199	4.8	▼0.7
Liberal Democrats	Rupert Redesdale	181	4.4	▼0.6
Conservative	Stephen Kreppel	156	3.8	▼0.7
Conservative	Regan King	151	3.6	▼0.7
Turnout			49.9	+5.8
Green gain from Labour		Swing	10.7	
Green gain from Labour		Swing	10.7	
Green gain from Labour		Swing	10.7	
