= Islington South and Finsbury =

UK Parliament constituency (since 1974)

Coordinates: 51.538°N 0.106°W

- Borough constituency for the House of Commons
- Interactive map of boundaries from 2024
- Location within Greater London
- County: Greater London
- Electorate: 75,905 (March 2020)

Current constituency
- Created: 1974
- Member of Parliament: Emily Thornberry (Labour)
- Seats: One
- Created from: Islington South West, and Shoreditch and Finsbury

Islington South and Finsbury is a constituency created in 1974 and represented in the House of Commons of the UK Parliament since 2005 by Emily Thornberry of the Labour Party. Thornberry served as Shadow Foreign Secretary from 2016 until 2020 and as Shadow Attorney General for England and Wales from 2021 to 2024.

== Constituency profile ==
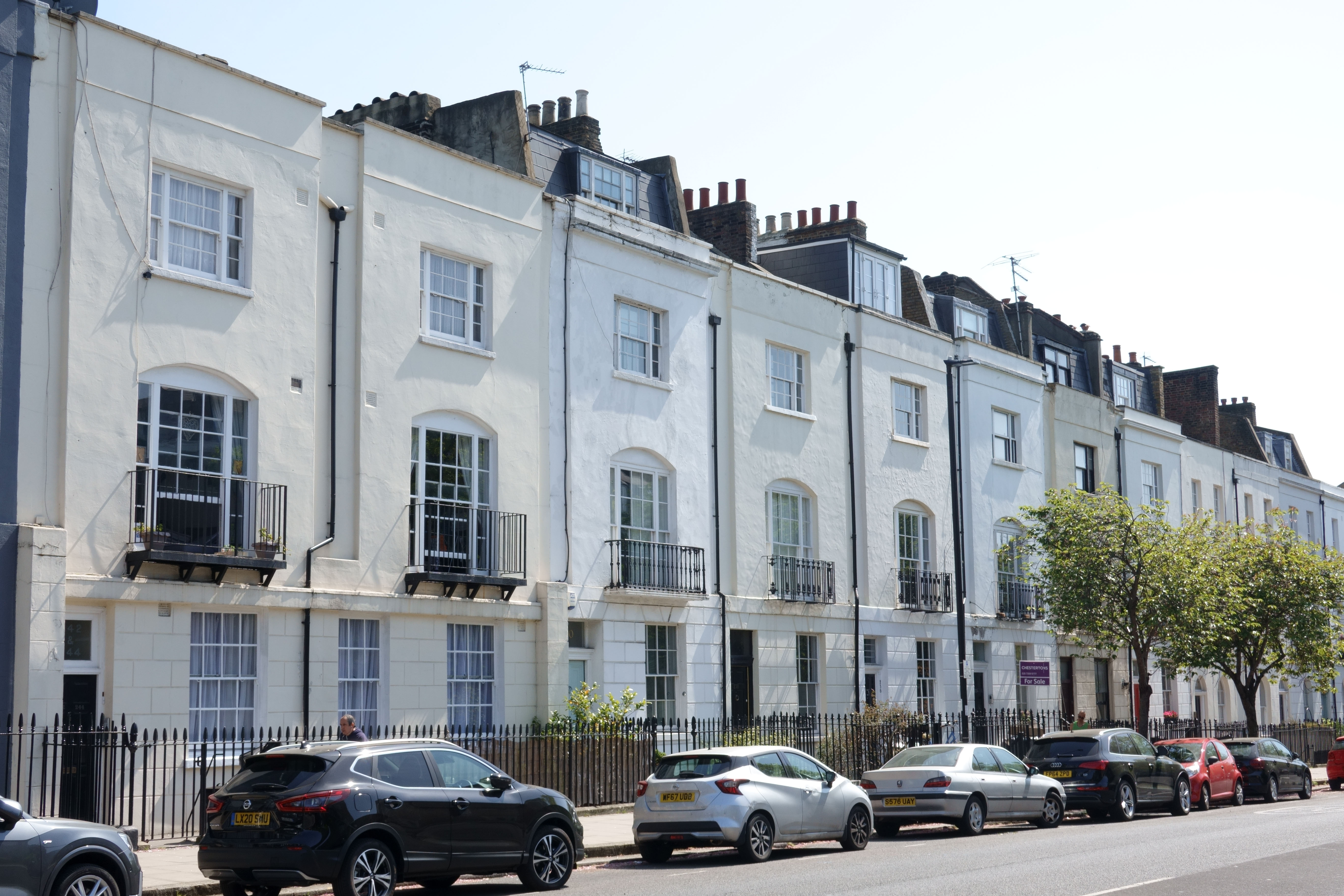
Typical housing in Islington South on Liverpool Road

Islington South and Finsbury is an urban constituency in Greater London, located around 2 miles (3.2 km) north of the centre of London. The constituency contains the Borough of Islington neighbourhoods of Islington, Barnsbury, Pentonville, Clerkenwell, Finsbury and parts of Holloway, and parts of Dalston in the neighbouring Borough of Hackney. This inner-city constituency is densely-populated and contains many Georgian townhouses. Islington was described in The Guardian as being "the spiritual home of Britain's left-wing intelligentsia". The constituency has average levels of wealth and deprivation, with some 20th-century social housing developments. House prices in the constituency are higher than the rest of London and almost three times the national average.

Residents of the constituency are very young and well-educated compared to the rest of the country. They are unlikely to be married and have low rates of homeownership. A high proportion of residents work in professional, scientific or technological occupations. White people made up 62% of the population at the 2021 census, a higher percentage than London as a whole. Around one-third of the White population are of non-British origin, including large Irish and American communities. Black people were the largest ethnic minority group at 12% and Asians were 11%. At the local borough council, all seats in the constituency are represented by Labour Party councillors. Voters in the constituency overwhelmingly supported remaining in the European Union in the 2016 referendum; an estimated 73% voted to remain compared to the nationwide figure of 48%, making Islington South and Finsbury one of the top-25 most Remain-supporting constituencies out of 650 across the United Kingdom.

== Boundaries ==
=== Historic ===
1974–1983: The London Borough of Islington wards of Barnsbury, Bunhill, Clerkenwell, Pentonville, St Mary, St Peter, and Thornhill.

1983–2010: As above, save that Pentonville was abolished and Canonbury East, Canonbury West, Hillmarton, Holloway were created or added to the seat.

2010–2024: The London Borough of Islington wards of Barnsbury, Bunhill, Caledonian, Canonbury, Clerkenwell, Holloway, St Mary's and St Peter's.

=== Current ===
Further to the 2023 review of Westminster constituencies, which came into effect for the 2024 general election, the constituency is composed of:

- The London Borough of Hackney ward of De Beauvoir; and
- The London Borough of Islington wards of Barnsbury, Bunhill, Caledonian, Canonbury, Clerkenwell, Holloway, Laycock, St Mary's and St James', and St Peter's and Canalside.

Expanded to bring its electorate within the permitted range by adding the Borough of Hackney ward of De Beauvoir. The area within the Borough of Islington was unchanged, but following a review of local authority ward boundaries which came into effect on 4 May 2022, some of the ward names have been modified.

The seat covers the southern part of the London Borough of Islington, including Barnsbury, Canonbury, major parts of Holloway, King's Cross and the former area of the Metropolitan Borough of Finsbury, which includes Bunhill, Pentonville and Clerkenwell. From 2024, it also includes the De Beauvoir Town neighbourhood in the Borough of Hackney.

== History ==
Islington South and Finsbury was created in 1974 from part of the former Islington South West and Shoreditch and Finsbury constituencies. In 1983, its boundaries changed when the Islington Central constituency was abolished and its area split between Islington South and Finsbury and Islington North.

Islington was an early stronghold for the SDP. All three sitting Labour MPs defected to the party together with a majority of the borough council. This was at the time when the Labour Party voted for in Conference leaving the European Economic Community (Common Market) and abolishing nuclear weapons during the Cold War which largely triggered the split. However, in spite of their less radical position than the Labour Party, they won only one seat to Labour's 59 in the 1982 Islington Council elections and at the 1983 general election, Labour managed to narrowly retain the seat. The new MP, Chris Smith was the first MP to come out as gay and was aligned with the Labour left, and retained the seat with a slight increase in his majority in 1987. By 1992, the post-merged SDP, the Liberal Democrats, had faded locally, and no longer had the former MP as a candidate, and Smith managed to win a majority exceeding 10,000 votes.

The Liberal Democrat revival in local elections in Islington, which saw them take control of the council in 2000, began to cross over to Parliamentary elections in 2001. In 2002, the Liberal Democrats won every council seat in Islington South and Finsbury, and Smith's subsequent retirement and the resultant loss of incumbency made the constituency vulnerable once again in 2005. However Smith's successor, Emily Thornberry, retained the seat with a narrow majority of 484 votes over the Liberal Democrat challenger, Barnsbury councillor Bridget Fox. — the seat therefore became one of the ten most marginal in Britain. However, in the local council elections a year later, Labour made an almost full recovery locally and won a majority of the seats in Islington South and Finsbury, defeating both Bridget Fox and the-then council leader Steve Hitchins. At the 2010 general election, Thornberry increased her majority over Fox. In 2014 the Liberal Democrats lost all their remaining seats on the council. The 2015 general election result made the seat the 93rd safest of Labour's 232 seats by percentage of majority.

== Members of Parliament ==
Election	Member	Party
Feb 1974	George Cunningham	Labour
1982	George Cunningham	SDP
1983	Chris Smith	Labour
2005	Emily Thornberry	Labour

== Election results ==
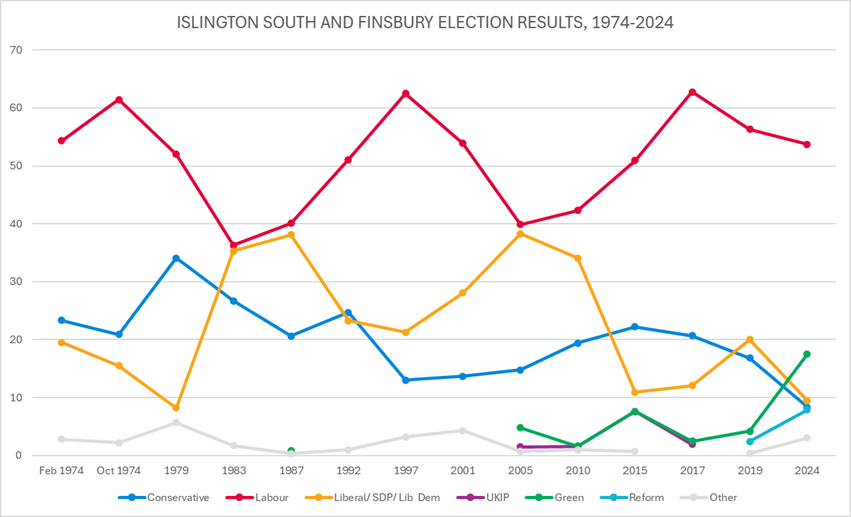
Election results (1974–2024)

=== Elections in the 2020s ===
General election 2024: Islington South and Finsbury
Party	Candidate	Votes	%	±%
Labour	Emily Thornberry	22,946	53.7	−3.3
Green	Carne Ross	7,491	17.5	+13.2
Liberal Democrats	Terry Stacy	4,045	9.5	−10.2
Conservative	Imogen Sinclair	3,584	8.4	−7.9
Reform	Max Nelson	3,388	7.9	+5.6
Independent	Andrew Parry	569	1.3	N/A
Party of Women	Lesley Woodburn	354	0.8	N/A
TUSC	Ethan Saunders	215	0.5	N/A
SDP	Jake Painter	162	0.4	N/A
Majority		15,455	36.2	–1.1
Turnout		42,754	57.7	−11.0
Registered electors		74,122		
Labour hold		Swing	−8.3	

=== Elections in the 2010s ===
2019 notional result
Party	Vote	%
Labour	29,728	57.0
Liberal Democrats	10,270	19.7
Conservative	8,518	16.3
Green	2,252	4.3
Brexit Party	1,193	2.3
Others	182	0.3
Turnout	52,143	68.7
Electorate	75,905	

General election 2019: Islington South and Finsbury
Party	Candidate	Votes	%	±%
Labour	Emily Thornberry	26,897	56.3	−6.5
Liberal Democrats	Kate Pothalingam	9,569	20.0	+7.9
Conservative	Jason Charalambous	8,045	16.8	−3.9
Green	Talia Hussain	1,987	4.2	+1.7
Brexit Party	Paddy Hannam	1,136	2.4	N/A
Monster Raving Loony	Sandys of Bunhill	182	0.4	N/A
Majority		17,328	36.3	−5.8
Turnout		47,816	67.8	−1.3
Registered electors		70,489		
Labour hold		Swing	-7.2	

General election 2017: Islington South and Finsbury
Party	Candidate	Votes	%	±%
Labour	Emily Thornberry	30,188	62.8	+11.9
Conservative	Jason Charalambous	9,925	20.7	−1.6
Liberal Democrats	Alain Desmier	5,809	12.1	+1.2
Green	Benali Hamdache	1,198	2.5	−5.1
UKIP	Pete Muswell	929	1.9	−5.7
Majority		20,263	42.1	+13.4
Turnout		48,049	69.1	+4.1
Registered electors		69,536		
Labour hold		Swing	+6.7	

General election 2015: Islington South and Finsbury
Party	Candidate	Votes	%	±%
Labour	Emily Thornberry	22,547	50.9	+8.7
Conservative	Mark Lim	9,839	22.2	+2.8
Liberal Democrats	Terry Stacy	4,829	10.9	−23.2
UKIP	Pete Muswell	3,375	7.6	+6.0
Green	Charlie Kiss	3,371	7.6	+6.0
CISTA	Jay Kirton	309	0.7	N/A
Majority		12,708	28.7	+20.5
Turnout		44,270	65.0	+0.6
Registered electors		68,127		
Labour hold		Swing	+3.0	

General election 2010: Islington South and Finsbury
Party	Candidate	Votes	%	±%
Labour	Emily Thornberry	18,407	42.3	+2.4
Liberal Democrats	Bridget Fox	14,838	34.1	−4.2
Conservative	Antonia Cox	8,449	19.4	+4.6
Green	James Humphreys	710	1.6	−3.2
UKIP	Rose-Marie McDonald	701	1.6	+0.1
English Democrat	John Dodds	301	0.7	N/A
Animal Welfare	Richard Deboo	149	0.3	N/A
Majority		3,569	8.2	+6.6
Turnout		43,555	64.4	+10.8
Registered electors		67,650		
Labour hold		Swing	+3.3	

=== Elections in the 2000s ===
General election 2005: Islington South and Finsbury
Party	Candidate	Votes	%	±%
Labour	Emily Thornberry	12,345	39.9	−14.0
Liberal Democrats	Bridget Fox	11,861	38.3	+10.2
Conservative	Melanie McLean	4,594	14.8	+1.1
Green	James Humphreys	1,471	4.8	N/A
UKIP	Patricia Theophanides	470	1.5	N/A
Monster Raving Loony	Andy "the Hat" Gardner	189	0.6	N/A
Independent	Chris Gidden	31	0.1	N/A
Majority		484	1.6	−24.2
Turnout		30,961	53.6	+6.2
Registered electors		57,748		
Labour hold		Swing	−12.1	

General election 2001: Islington South and Finsbury
Party	Candidate	Votes	%	±%
Labour	Chris Smith	15,217	53.9	−8.6
Liberal Democrats	Keith Sharp	7,937	28.1	+6.8
Conservative	Nicky Morgan	3,860	13.7	+0.7
Socialist Alliance	Janine Booth	817	2.9	N/A
Independent	Thomas McCarthy	276	1.0	+0.5
Stuckist Party	Charles Thomson	108	0.4	N/A
Majority		7,280	25.8	−15.4
Turnout		28,215	47.4	−16.3
Registered electors		59,516		
Labour hold		Swing	-7.7	

=== Elections in the 1990s ===
General election 1997: Islington South and Finsbury
Party	Candidate	Votes	%	±%
Labour	Chris Smith	22,079	62.5	+11.4
Liberal Democrats	Sarah Ludford	7,516	21.3	−2.0
Conservative	David Berens	4,587	13.0	−11.7
Referendum	Jane Bryett	741	2.1	N/A
Independent	Alan Laws	171	0.5	N/A
Natural Law	Martin Creese	121	0.3	+0.09
Independent	Erol Basarik	101	0.3	N/A
Majority		14,563	41.2	+14.76
Turnout		35,316	63.7	−8.82
Registered electors		55,468		
Labour hold		Swing	+6.6	

General election 1992: Islington South and Finsbury
Party	Candidate	Votes	%	±%
Labour	Chris Smith	20,586	51.1	+11.0
Conservative	Mark Jones	9,934	24.7	+4.1
Liberal Democrats	Christopher Pryce	9,387	23.3	−14.8
Justice From British Rail	Rhona Hersey	149	0.4	N/A
Monster Raving Loony	Marie Avino	142	0.4	N/A
Natural Law	Michael Spinks	83	0.2	N/A
Majority		10,652	26.4	+24.4
Turnout		40,281	72.5	+1.3
Registered electors		55,541		
Labour hold		Swing		

=== Elections in the 1980s ===
General election 1987: Islington South and Finsbury
Party	Candidate	Votes	%	±%
Labour	Chris Smith	16,511	40.1	+3.8
SDP	George Cunningham	15,706	38.1	+2.8
Conservative	Andrew Mitchell	8,482	20.6	−6.1
Green	Peter Powell	382	0.9	N/A
Socialist (GB)	Stephen Dowsett	81	0.2	0.0
Humanist	Judith Early	56	0.1	N/A
Majority		805	2.0	+1.0
Turnout		41,218	71.2	+9.2
Registered electors		57,910		
Labour hold		Swing	+0.5	

General election 1983: Islington South and Finsbury
Party	Candidate	Votes	%	±%
Labour	Chris Smith	13,460	36.3	−15.7
SDP	George Cunningham	13,097	35.3	N/A
Conservative	Arthur Johnston	9,894	26.7	−7.4
National Front	John Donegan	341	0.9	−2.5
Islington and Finsbury Party	J. Murphy	102	0.3	N/A
BNP	D. Stentiford	94	0.3	N/A
Socialist (GB)	Clifford Slapper	85	0.2	−0.1
Majority		363	1.0	−17.0
Turnout		37,073	62.0	−0.9
Registered electors		59,795		
Labour hold		Swing		

=== Elections in the 1970s ===
General election 1979: Islington South and Finsbury
Party	Candidate	Votes	%	±%
Labour	George Cunningham	12,581	52.04	−9.41
Conservative	Nigel Waterson	8,237	34.07	+13.15
Liberal	Antony Dean	1,991	8.24	−7.23
National Front	Paul Kavanagh	824	3.41	N/A
Communist	Marie Betteridge	330	1.36	−0.80
New Britain	Dennis Delderfield	136	0.56	N/A
Socialist (GB)	Ralph Critchfield	78	0.32	N/A
Majority		4,344	17.97	−22.56
Turnout		24,177	62.92	+6.9
Registered electors		38,427		
Labour hold		Swing		

General election October 1974: Islington South and Finsbury
Party	Candidate	Votes	%	±%
Labour	George Cunningham	14,544	61.45	+7.1
Conservative	P. Hodgson	3,951	20.92	−2.4
Liberal	R. Adams	3,661	15.47	−4.1
Communist	Marie Betteridge	512	2.2	+0.4
Majority		9,593	40.5	+9.6
Turnout		22,668	56.0	−10.1
Registered electors		42,251		
Labour hold		Swing		

General election February 1974: Islington South and Finsbury
Party	Candidate	Votes	%	±%
Labour	George Cunningham	15,064	54.31	
Conservative	J. Szemerey	6,473	23.34	
Liberal	R. Adams	5,415	19.52	
Communist	Marie Betteridge	492	1.77	
Independent	A. Lomas	293	1.06	
Majority		8,591	30.97	
Turnout		27,737	66.06	
Registered electors		41,988		
Labour win (new seat)				

== See also ==
- Parliamentary constituencies in London
- List of parliamentary constituencies in Islington
