= 1994 Islington London Borough Council election =

1994 local election in England

- 5 May 1994

All 52 seats up for election to Islington London Borough Council 27 seats needed for a majority
- Registered: 113,589
- Turnout: 49,208, 43.32% (▼2.92)

	First party	Second party	Third party
Leader	Derek Sawyer	Steve Hitchins	Clive Blackwood (Note: Leader by default as he is the only conservative councillor)
Party	Labour	Liberal Democrats	Conservative
Last election	49 seats, 55.39%	3 seats, 7.61%	0 seats, 15.6%
Seats before	47	4	1
Seats won	39	12	1
Seat change	▼8	▲8	Steady
Popular vote	63,475	35,232	15,083
Percentage	52.49%	29.14%	12.47%
Council control before election
Labour
Council control after election
Alan Clinton
Labour

The 1994 Islington Council election took place on 5 May 1994 to elect members of Islington London Borough Council in London, England. The whole council was up for election and the Labour party stayed in overall control of the council.

== Election result ==
1994 Islington Borough Council election
Party	Seats	Gains	Losses	Net gain/loss	Seats %	Votes %	Votes	+/−
Labour	39	0	8	▼8	75.00	52.49	63,475	▼2.90
Liberal Democrats	12	0	8	▲8	23.08	29.14	35,232	▲21.53
Conservative	1	0	0	Steady	1.92	12.47	15,083	▼4.90
Green	0	0	0	Steady	0.00	3.06	3,697	▼3.74
Tenants and Residents	0	0	0	Steady	0.00	2.17	2,624	▼4.08
Independents	0	0	0	Steady	0.00	0.67	812	▲0.52
Total	52						120,923	

== Council Composition ==
Prior to the election the composition of the council was: (Note: Labour had lost 2 seats to by-elections in between the 1990 and 1994 elections. A seat in Clerkenwell ward was lost to the Lib Dems in 1991 and another was lost in Quadrant to the Conservatives in 1992)

↓
44	4	1	3
Labour	Lib Dem	Con	Vacant

After the election the composition of the council was

↓
39	12	1
Labour	Lib Dem	Con

== Ward results ==
(*) - Indicates an incumbent candidate

(†) - Indicates an incumbent candidate standing in a different ward

=== Barnsbury ===
Barnsbury (3)
Party	Candidate	Votes	%	±%
Labour	Winston Winston	1,556	57.55	▲13.25
Labour	Louisa Mallard	1,555		
Labour	Mark Stacey	1,487		
Liberal Democrats	Katherine Hall	669	24.06	New
Liberal Democrats	Isobel Cox	638		
Liberal Democrats	Jonathan Wright	617		
Conservative	Aidan Langley	505	18.39	▲5.76
Conservative	Charles Hoare	494		
Conservative	Martin Moyes	472		
Registered electors		6,507		▲62
Turnout		2,869	44.09	▼4.82
Rejected ballots		14	0.49	▲0.39
Labour hold				
Labour hold				
Labour hold				

=== Bunhill ===
Bunhill (3)
Party	Candidate	Votes	%	±%
Liberal Democrats	Joseph Trotter	1,662	59.64	New
Liberal Democrats	Rosetta Wooding	1,537		
Liberal Democrats	Ian Thorn	1,495		
Labour	Joan Herbert^{†} (Note: Joan was a sitting councillor representing the Barnsbury ward)	933	34.76	▼4.59
Labour	Terence Herbert*	924		
Labour	Anne Gilman^{†} (Note: Gilman was a sitting councillor representing the Canonbury East ward)	879		
Conservative	Richard Edwards	174	5.60	▼18.74
Conservative	Alam-Zeb Khan	136		
Conservative	Hugo Summerson	130		
Registered electors		5,837		▼1,022
Turnout		2,804	48.04	▲1.79
Rejected ballots		1	0.04	▼0.05
Liberal Democrats gain from Labour				
Liberal Democrats gain from Labour				
Liberal Democrats gain from Labour				

=== Canonbury East ===
Canonbury East (2)
Party	Candidate	Votes	%	±%
Labour	Andrew Bosi*	847	36.41	▲1.25
Labour	James Purnell	714		
Tenants and Residents	Ernest Bayliss	646	28.21	▲1.72
Liberal Democrats	James Doyle	595	22.89	New
Tenants and Residents	John Plummer	564		
Liberal Democrats	Jamshid Arfa	387		
Green	Susan Wilkinson	135	6.29	▼2.79
Conservative	Alan Johnson	90	3.68	▼5.66
Conservative	James Rooke	68		
Independent	Colin Dent	54	2.52	New
Registered electors		4,969		▲162
Turnout		2,249	45.26	▼4.33
Rejected ballots		4	0.18	▼0.11
Labour hold				
Labour hold				

=== Canonbury West ===
Canonbury West (2)
Party	Candidate	Votes	%	±%
Labour	Caroline Baggs	878	50.26	▲5.29
Labour	Thomas Simpson*	875		
Conservative	John Cable	429	23.90	▼2.85
Conservative	Margaret Reese	405		
Liberal Democrats	Gerald Sattin	350	19.37	▲5.62
Liberal Democrats	John Tasker	326		
Green	Adrian Williams	113	6.47	▼8.06
Registered electors		4,182		▼72
Turnout		1,824	43.62	▼5.53
Rejected ballots		4	0.22	▼0.07
Labour hold				
Labour hold				

=== Clerkenwell ===
Clerkenwell (3)
Party	Candidate	Votes	%	±%
Liberal Democrats	Sarah Ludford* (Note: Ludford replaced Cllr Paul Matthews after his death in 1991)	2,213	59.07	New
Liberal Democrats	Bruce Neave	1,952		
Liberal Democrats	David Tibbs	1,805		
Labour	Joseph Harris	936	26.92	▼5.91
Labour	Valda James	913		
Labour	Piers Herbert	871		
Tenants and Residents	Eileen O'Keefe	362	10.06	▼12.71
Tenants and Residents	Helen	315		
Conservative	Jane Langley	136	3.95	▼6.37
Conservative	Mark Eldridge	135		
Conservative	Reginald Brown	128		
Registered electors		7,267		▲218
Turnout		3,474	47.81	▼2.21
Rejected ballots		13	0.37	▲0.28
Liberal Democrats hold				
Liberal Democrats gain from Labour				
Liberal Democrats gain from Labour				

=== Gillespie ===
Gillespie (2)
Party	Candidate	Votes	%	±%
Labour	Jenette Golding	1,138	65.21	▲2.40
Labour	Richard Greening	1,104		
Liberal Democrats	Philip Middleton	257	13.44	▲6.54
Green	Sara Meidan	208	12.10	▼3.98
Liberal Democrats	Philip Moss	205		
Conservative	Anthony Williamson	171	9.25	▼5.33
Conservative	Mahendra Oza	146		
Registered electors		4,018		▲49
Turnout		1,721	42.83	▼4.16
Rejected ballots		5	0.29	▼0.09
Labour hold				
Labour hold				

=== Highbury ===
Highbury (3)
Party	Candidate	Votes	%	±%
Labour	Stewart Cross	1,318	43.56	▼2.71
Labour	Milton Babulall*	1,213		
Labour	Ansar Khan	1,182		
Green	Christopher Ashby	759	26.71	▲2.64
Liberal Democrats	Bridget Fox	399	12.63	▲5.67
Liberal Democrats	Nicholas Carlisle	381		
Tenants and Residents	Edward Beford	349	8.66	▼0.44
Liberal Democrats	Nigel Grinyer	297		
Conservative	Caroline Blackwood	266	8.44	▼5.16
Conservative	Simon Matthews	234		
Conservative	Nicholas Canty	221		
Tenants and Residents	William Maffrett	214		
Tenants and Residents	Daniel McMillan	174		
Registered electors		6,255		▼162
Turnout		2,572	41.12	▼5.27
Rejected ballots		4	0.16	▼0.14
Labour hold				
Labour hold				
Labour hold				

=== Highview ===
Highview (2)
Party	Candidate	Votes	%	±%
Labour	Maureen Leigh*	1,077	69.62	▲5.31
Labour	Robert Mowle*	967		
Conservative	Theresa Aldis	160	10.22	▼5.87
Green	Timothy Weekes	150	10.22	▼9.38
Liberal Democrats	Michael Verrier	148	9.95	New
Liberal Democrats	Sheila Verrier	144		
Conservative	Barry Gibbs	140		
Registered electors		3,753		▲157
Turnout		1,516	40.39	▼7.11
Rejected ballots		8	0.53	Steady
Labour hold				
Labour hold				

=== Hillmarton ===
Hillmarton (2)
Party	Candidate	Votes	%	±%
Labour	Arthur Bell*	1,317	65.19	▲7.44
Labour	Phil Kelly*	1,237		
Liberal Democrats	Tim Johnson	410	19.91	▲10.15
Liberal Democrats	Martin Case-Jones	369		
Conservative	Martin Hutchinson	295	14.91	▼4.65
Conservative	Roy Taft	288		
Registered electors		5,135		▲435
Turnout		2,085	40.60	▼5.08
Rejected ballots		4	0.19	▼0.14
Labour hold				
Labour hold				

=== Hillrise ===
Hillrise (3)
Party	Candidate	Votes	%	±%
Labour	Alan Clinton*	1,631	61.99	▲3.34
Labour	John Burke*	1,591		
Labour	Ruth Steigman	1,378		
Liberal Democrats	Penelope Aitken	436	15.08	▲5.67
Liberal Democrats	Heather Eggins	372		
Liberal Democrats	James Upson	312		
Green	Judith Kleinman	232	9.38	▼8.90
Conservative	Neil Taylor	202	7.89	▼5.77
Conservative	Oriel Hutchinson	195		
Conservative	Jennifer Moody	189		
Residents	Derrick Heath	140	5.66	New
Registered electors		6,324		▲306
Turnout		2,419	38.25	▼6.08
Rejected ballots		6	0.25	▲0.06
Labour hold				
Labour hold				
Labour hold				

=== Holloway ===
Holloway (3)
Party	Candidate	Votes	%	±%
Liberal Democrats	Margot Dunn	1,493	48.22	▲40.60
Liberal Democrats	Douglas Taylor	1,344		
Liberal Democrats	Barry Kempton	1,316		
Labour	Edna Griffiths*	1,236	42.75	▼8.10
Labour	Sheila Camp^{†} (Note: Camp was a sitting councillor representing Mildmay ward)	1,235		
Labour	Leo McKinstry*	1,210		
Green	Charmaine Charrier	146	5.09	▼5.65
Conservative	Evelyn Johnson	135	3.94	▼8.22
Conservative	Alan Reese	107		
Conservative	Mark Rittner	96		
Registered electors		6,055		▼193
Turnout		2,998	49.51	▲6.15
Rejected ballots		3	0.10	▼0.27
Liberal Democrats gain from Labour				
Liberal Democrats gain from Labour				
Liberal Democrats gain from Labour				

=== Junction ===
Junction (3)
Party	Candidate	Votes	%	±%
Labour	Sandra Marks^{†} (Note: Marks was a sitting councillor representing St George's ward)	1,656	62.34	▲3.54
Labour	Taha Karim*	1,630		
Labour	Tal Michael	1,497		
Liberal Democrats	Jane Little	415	13.96	New
Liberal Democrats	Pauline Callow	355		
Green	Angela Royston	338	13.22	▼10.30
Liberal Democrats	Alford Reeves	300		
Conservative	Victoria Lloyd	280	10.48	▼7.19
Conservative	Anthea Ward	268		
Conservative	Edward Scilloe	255		
Registered electors		6,488		▲47
Turnout		2,584	39.83	▼5.69
Rejected ballots		12	0.46	▲0.22
Labour hold				
Labour hold				
Labour hold				

=== Mildmay ===
Mildmay (3)
Party	Candidate	Votes	%	±%
Labour	Patrick E. Haynes*	1,595	51.67	▲0.61
Labour	Michael Boye-Anawomah	1,468		
Labour	Neil Mercer	1,438		
Conservative	Simon Cooper	674	22.84	▲4.09
Conservative	David Evans	669		
Conservative	Jose Chans	647		
Liberal Democrats	Anna Berent	423	13.37	▲2.12
Liberal Democrats	Derek Jackson	404		
Green	Karen Stack	352	12.13	▼6.80
Liberal Democrats	Adam Macgill	338		
Registered electors		7,589		▲257
Turnout		2,914	38.40	▼5.75
Rejected ballots		7	0.24	▲0.02
Labour hold				
Labour hold				
Labour hold				

=== Quadrant ===
Quadrant (2)
Party	Candidate	Votes	%	±%
Conservative	Clive Blackwood* (Note: Blackwood replaced Cllr Jane Mackay after her resignation in 1992)	1,218	44.27	▲19.11
Labour	David Barnes*	1,095	42.51	▼9.18
Labour	Jennifer Sands	1,027		
Conservative	Christopher Pincher	992		
Liberal Democrats	Elizabeth Rorison	182	6.85	▼3.49
Liberal Democrats	Raymond James	160		
Green	John Ackers	159	6.37	▼7.44
Registered electors		5,099		▲220
Turnout		2,573	50.46	▲3.52
Rejected ballots		9	0.35	▲0.13
Conservative hold				
Labour hold				

=== St George's ===
St George's (3)
Party	Candidate	Votes	%	±%
Labour	Peter Chalk* (Note: Chalk replaced Cllr Chris Adamson after his resignation in 1993)	1,528	49.50	▼6.56
Labour	Claire Gontier	1,402		
Labour	Paul Munim	1,207		
Liberal Democrats	Andrew Adonis	424	12.63	New
Independent	John Gallagher	399	14.32	New
Green	Mary Adshead	363	13.03	▼12.07
Liberal Democrats	Helen Thorn	327		
Conservative	Andrew McHallam	316	10.52	▼8.32
Liberal Democrats	Hilary Nimmo	305		
Conservative	Rifat Bairam	294		
Conservative	Charles Sharman	270		
Registered electors		6,621		▲310
Turnout		2,574	38.88	▼4.49
Rejected ballots		3	0.12	▼0.06
Labour hold				
Labour hold				
Labour hold				

=== St Mary ===
St Mary (3)
Party	Candidate	Votes	%	±%
Labour	Paul Jackson	1,195	52.14	▼4.30
Labour	Clare Jeapes*	1,184		
Labour	Paul Convery*	1,171		
Conservative	Tracey Braddick	528	22.43	▲4.97
Conservative	Alexandra Eldridge	500		
Conservative	Claire Denison	498		
Liberal Democrats	Nicola-Jane Taylor	421	17.32	New
Liberal Democrats	David Sterrett	383		
Liberal Democrats	Sidney Kimbrough	374		
Green	Jeremy Monson	184	8.11	▼7.96
Registered electors		5,362		▲449
Turnout		2,336	43.57	▼2.94
Rejected ballots		6	0.26	▼0.05
Labour hold				
Labour hold				
Labour hold				

=== St Peter ===
St Peter (3)
Party	Candidate	Votes	%	±%
Liberal Democrats	Maria Powell*	1,891	62.13	▲17.77
Liberal Democrats	Stephen Hitchins*	1,826		
Liberal Democrats	Christopher Pryce*	1,807		
Labour	Lloyd Child	1,028	33.34	▲3.90
Labour	Doreen Prichard	969		
Labour	Carol Rawlings	966		
Conservative	Thomas Duke	156	4.52	▼4.49
Conservative	Stephen McMinnies	128		
Conservative	Barry Mason	119		
Registered electors		6.407		▲93
Turnout		3,129	48.84	▼1.03
Rejected ballots		7	0.22	▼0.07
Liberal Democrats hold				
Liberal Democrats hold				
Liberal Democrats hold				

=== Sussex ===
Sussex (2)
Party	Candidate	Votes	%	±%
Labour	Meg Hillier	1,160	56.96	▼9.60
Labour	Stephen Twigg* (Note: Twigg replaced Cllr Christopher King after his resignation in 1992)	1,156		
Liberal Democrats	Matthew Ryan	671	32.12	New
Liberal Democrats	Sylvia Keenan	634		
Green	Paul Ward	127	6.25	▼12.23
Conservative	Juliet Blick	103	4.67	▼10.29
Conservative	Nigel Shervey	86		
Registered electors		4,395		▲109
Turnout		2,123	48.31	▲2.88
Rejected ballots		8	0.38	▼0.13
Labour hold				
Labour hold				

=== Thornhill ===
Thornhill (2)
Party	Candidate	Votes	%	±%
Labour	Ian Perry*	1,140	63.57	▼0.20
Labour	Alan Laws*	1,132		
Liberal Democrats	Patricia Peel	319	16.45	New
Liberal Democrats	Neil Buckley	268		
Conservative	Richard Campbell	259	12.53	▼5.43
Conservative	David Pittaway	189		
Green	Robin Latimer	133	7.44	▼10.83
Registered electors		4,489		▼86
Turnout		1,913	42.62	▼0.55
Rejected ballots		6	0.31	▲0.11
Labour hold				
Labour hold				

=== Tollington ===
Tollington (3)
Party	Candidate	Votes	%	±%
Labour	Elizabeth Davies*	1,644	58.25	▲1.61
Labour	Roger McKenzie	1,606		
Labour	Derek Sawyer^{†} (Note: Sawyer was a sitting councillor representing the Mildmay ward)	1,379		
Independent	Michael Rosenbaum	354	13.36	New
Liberal Democrats	Charles Cohen	353	11.02	▲4.68
Liberal Democrats	Elizabeth Mayer	314		
Green	Judith Benli	298	11.25	▼5.50
Liberal Democrats	Mark Thatcher	209		
Conservative	Raymond Muggeridge	192	6.12	▼4.29
Conservative	Joseph Owino	151		
Conservative	Allan Saile	144		
Registered electors		6,837		▲165
Turnout		2,531	37.02	▼6.09
Rejected ballots		8	0.32	▼0.55
Labour hold				
Labour hold				
Labour hold				
