= 1990 Islington London Borough Council election =

Local election in England

- 3 May 1990

All 52 seats up for election to Islington London Borough Council 27 seats needed for a majority
- Registered: 112,085
- Turnout: 51,827, 46.24%

	First party	Second party	Third party
Party	Labour	Liberal Democrats	Independent Liberal
Seats before	36	15	1
Seats after	49	3	0
Seat change	▲13	▼12	▼1
Popular vote	70,112	9,630	948
Percentage	55.39%	7.61%	0.70%
	Fourth party	Fifth party	Sixth party
Party	Conservative	Green	Tenants and Residents
Seats before	0	0	0
Seats after	0	0	0
Seat change	Steady	Steady	Steady
Popular vote	21,991	8,610	7,912
Percentage	17.37%	6.80%	6.25%
		Eighth party
Party		SDP
Seats before		0
Seats after		0
Seat change		Steady
Popular vote		7,186
Percentage		5.68%
Council control before election
Labour
Council control after election
Labour

The 1990 Islington Council election took place on 3 May 1990 to elect members of Islington Borough Council in London, England. The whole council was up for election and the Labour Party stayed in overall control of the council.

== Background ==
Council Composition just before the 3rd May election

== Election Results ==
1990 Islington London Borough Council Election
Party	Seats	Gains	Losses	Net gain/loss	Seats %	Votes %	Votes	+/−
Labour	49	13	0	▲13	94.23	55.39	70,112	
Liberal Democrats	3	0	12	▼12	5.77	7.61	9,630	
Conservative	0	0	0	Steady	0.00	17.37	21,991	
Green	0	0	0	Steady	0.00	6.80	8,610	
Tenants and Residents	0	0	0	Steady	0.00	6.25	7,912	
SDP	0	0	0	Steady	0.00	5.68	7,186	
Independent Liberal	0	0	1	▼1	0.00	0.75	948	
Independent	0	0	0	Steady	0.00	0.15	192	
Total	52						16,581	

== Ward Results ==
=== Barnsbury ===
Barnsbury (3)
Party	Candidate	Votes	%
Labour	Joan E. Herbert	1,537	44.30
Labour	Gordon Johnston	1,508	
Labour	Valda James	1,488	
SDP	Ann Brennan*	793	20.76
SDP	George A. Lambillion*	744	
SDP	Sylvia F. Smart	587	
Green	Annie Chipchase	496	14.54
Conservative	Alexandra C. Eldridge	469	12.63
Conservative	Martin R.C. Moyes	419	
Conservative	Irene G.L. Moore	404	
Tenants and Residents	Christine M.A. Rodgers	265	7.77
Registered electors		6,445	
Turnout		3,152	48.91
Rejected ballots		3	0.10
Labour gain from Liberal Democrats			
Labour gain from Liberal Democrats			
Labour gain from Liberal Democrats			

=== Bunhill ===
Bunhill (3)
Party	Candidate	Votes	%
Labour	Terence J. Herbert*	1,283	39.35
Labour	Peter J. Noble	1,224	
Labour	Michael J. Devenney	1,136	
SDP	Joseph R. Trotter*	979	26.87
SDP	Jennifer A. Durlacher	771	
Conservative	Tracey A. Braddick	761	24.34
Conservative	Michael I. Williams	759	
SDP	Gidon Z. Cohen	738	
Conservative	Stephen M. McMinnies	734	
Green	Jeremy Brooks	291	9.43
Registered electors		6,859	
Turnout		3,172	46.25
Rejected ballots		3	0.09
Labour gain from Liberal Democrats			
Labour gain from Liberal Democrats			
Labour hold			

=== Canonbury East ===
Canonbury East (2)
Party	Candidate	Votes	%
Labour	Andrew Bosi	863	35.16
Labour	Anne H.D. Gillman	809	
Tenants and Residents	Ernest J.W. Bayliss	670	26.49
Tenants and Residents	John E. Plummer	589	
Independent Liberal	James A. Doyle*	560	19.93
Independent Liberal	Alexander V. Miller	388	
Conservative	James A. Rooke	236	9.34
Green	Douglas F. Gleave	216	9.08
Conservative	Stanley H. Yass	207	
Registered electors		4,807	
Turnout		2,384	49.59
Rejected ballots		7	0.29
Labour gain from Independent Liberal			
Labour gain from Liberal Democrats			

=== Canonbury West ===
Canonbury West (2)
Party	Candidate	Votes	%
Labour	Thomas J. Simpson*	962	44.97
Labour	Howard L. Mann*	913	
Conservative	John E. Cable	577	26.75
Conservative	Margaret D. Reese	539	
Liberal Democrats	Rowan G. Menzies	314	13.75
Green	Peter C. Powell	303	14.53
Liberal Democrats	Margot Dunn	259	
Registered electors		4,254	
Turnout		2,091	49.15
Rejected ballots		6	0.29
Labour hold			
Labour hold			

=== Clerkenwell ===
Clerkenwell (3)
Party	Candidate	Votes	%
Labour	Paul A. Matthews	1,366	32.83
Labour	Mark R. Hill	1,232	
Labour	John A. Worker	1,160	
Tenants and Residents	Helen M. Cagnoni	907	22.77
Tenants and Residents	Frederick Johns	857	
Tenants and Residents	Timothy F. Finch	843	
SDP	Philip G. Moss	632	16.09
SDP	Kevin P. O'Keefe	619	
SDP	David C. Tibbs	590	
Green	Karen S. Stack	495	12.97
Conservative	Rita M. Bromfield	426	10.32
Conservative	Jennifer J.B. Beattie	406	
Conservative	Reginald H. Brown	349	
Independent	Anthony W. Bright	192	5.03
Registered electors		7,049	
Turnout		3,526	50.02
Rejected ballots		3	0.09
Labour gain from Liberal Democrats			
Labour gain from Liberal Democrats			
Labour gain from Liberal Democrats			

=== Gillespie ===
Gillespie (2)
Party	Candidate	Votes	%
Labour	Diane L. Burridge*	1,215	62.81
Labour	Jennifer M. Sands*	1,128	
Green	Andrew R. Myer	300	16.08
Conservative	Sylvia M.L. Macdonald-Jones	286	14.58
Conservative	William D. Thomas	258	
Liberal Democrats	Philip D. Middleton	136	6.54
Liberal Democrats	David N. Pollard	108	
Registered electors		3,969	
Turnout		1,865	46.99
Rejected ballots		7	0.38
Labour hold			
Labour hold			

=== Highbury ===
Highbury (3)
Party	Candidate	Votes	%
Labour	Kevin S. Arthurs*	1,662	46.27
Labour	Milton K. Babulall	1.507	
Labour	Bob Crossman†	1,495	
Green	Christopher M. Ashby	809	24.07
Conservative	Colin T. Dancer	497	13.60
Conservative	Richard J. Edmunds	457	
Conservative	Peter B. Moody	417	
Tenants and Residents	Edward G. Bedford	364	9.10
Tenants and Residents	George H. Howard	248	
Liberal Democrats	Patricia A. Tuson	239	6.96
Liberal Democrats	Liam P.B. Cowdrey	235	
Liberal Democrats	Richard Fernyhough	228	
Registered electors		6,417	
Turnout		2,977	46.39
Rejected ballots		9	0.30
Labour hold			
Labour hold			
Labour hold			

=== Highview ===
Highview (2)
Party	Candidate	Votes	%
Labour	Maureen Leigh*	1,203	64.31
Labour	Robert A. Mowle	994	
Green	Thurston G. Arrowsmith	335	19.60
Conservative	Barry J. Gibbs	285	16.09
Conservative	Caroline R. Whitfield	264	
Registered electors		3,596	
Turnout		1,708	47.50
Rejected ballots		10	0.53
Labour hold			
Labour hold			

=== Hillmarton ===
Hillmarton (2)
Party	Candidate	Votes	%
Labour	Arthur L. Bell*	1,286	57.75
Labour	Philip J. Kelly	1,187	
Conservative	Alan Johnson	427	19.56
Conservative	Roy P.C. Taft	410	
Green	Ann C. Wainwright	277	12.93
Liberal Democrats	Tim Johnson	252	9.76
Liberal Democrats	Elizabeth Sidney	165	
Registered electors		4,700	
Turnout		2,147	45.68
Rejected ballots		7	0.33
Labour hold			
Labour hold			

=== Hillrise ===
Hillrise (3)
Party	Candidate	Votes	%
Labour	Alan M. Clinton	1,731	58.65
Labour	John Burke	1,664	
Labour	Dina Kleanthous	1,525	
Green	Roger B. Whitney	511	18.28
Conservative	Merryl S. Cave	391	13.66
Conservative	David R. Starkey	385	
Conservative	Elizabeth M. Stephens	371	
Liberal Democrats	Sarah A. Ludford	272	9.41
Liberal Democrats	Geoffrey Hubbard	254	
Registered electors		6,018	
Turnout		2,668	44.33
Rejected ballots		5	0.19
Labour hold			
Labour hold			
Labour hold			

=== Holloway ===
Holloway (3)
Party	Candidate	Votes	%
Labour	Edna Griffiths	1,396	50.85
Labour	Leo J.C. McKinstry	1,295	
Labour	David L. Yorath	1,271	
Tenants and Residents	Patrick McCann	595	18.63
Tenants and Residents	Mary E. Churchward	436	
Tenants and Residents	John Saunders	421	
Conservative	Evelyn Johnson	351	12.16
Conservative	Alan J.M. Reese	322	
Green	Hilary A. Hutcheon	279	10.74
Conservative	Mark A.H. Rittner	276	
Liberal Democrats	Patricia M. Duncan	227	7.62
Liberal Democrats	Margaret H. Chester	189	
Liberal Democrats	Patricia M. Peel	178	
Registered electors		6,248	
Turnout		2,709	43.36
Rejected ballots		10	0.37
Labour hold			
Labour hold			
Labour hold			

=== Junction ===
Junction (3)
Party	Candidate	Votes	%
Labour	Candy Atherton*	1,929	58.80
Labour	Robert G. Durack	1,810	
Labour	Taha T. Karim*	1,631	
Green	Mary H. Adshead	716	23.52
Conservative	Kingsley G. Manning	567	17.67
Conservative	Christine P. Cardow	553	
Conservative	Robin J. Cave	493	
Registered electors		6,441	
Turnout		2,932	45.52
Rejected ballots		7	0.24
Labour hold			
Labour hold			
Labour hold			

=== Mildmay ===
Mildmay (3)
Party	Candidate	Votes	%
Labour	Patrick E. Haynes*	1,869	51.06
Labour	Sheila A. Camp	1,767	
Labour	Derek A. Sawyer*	1,551	
Conservative	Clive D. Blackwood	678	18.75
Conservative	Raymond L.J. Muggeridge	655	
Green	Richard C. Salmon	641	18.93
Conservative	Mahendra S. Oza	571	
Liberal Democrats	Anna Berent	446	11.25
Liberal Democrats	Stephen R. Hatch	356	
Liberal Democrats	John Tasker	341	
Registered electors		7,332	
Turnout		3,237	44.15
Rejected ballots		7	0.22
Labour hold			
Labour hold			
Labour hold			

=== Quadrant ===
Quadrant (2)
Party	Candidate	Votes	%
Labour	David P. Barnes*	1,246	51.69
Labour	Jane Mackay	1,111	
Conservative	Jennifer Moody	578	25.16
Conservative	Mark C. Field	569	
Green	John V. Hindes	315	13.81
Liberal Democrats	Pauline M. Callow	228	9.34
Liberal Democrats	Raymond C. James	198	
Registered electors		4,879	
Turnout		2,290	46.94
Rejected ballots		5	0.22
Labour hold			
Labour hold			

=== St George's ===
St George's (3)
Party	Candidate	Votes	%
Labour	Chris Adamson	1,748	56.06
Labour	Sandra Marks	1,611	
Labour	Avramakis P. Messis	1,454	
Green	Beatrice M. Rolph	718	25.10
Conservative	Kenneth E.J. Graham	555	18.84
Conservative	Nigel P.G. Boardman	549	
Conservative	Kenneth Hynes	513	
Registered electors		6,311	
Turnout		2,737	43.37
Rejected ballots		5	0.18
Labour hold			
Labour hold			
Labour hold			

=== St Mary ===
St Mary (3)
Party	Candidate	Votes	%
Labour	Clare E. Jeapes	1,157	47.84
Labour	Gregory J, Hayman	1,149	
Labour	Paul E. Convery	1,114	
Conservative	Mark Eldridge	451	17.46
Conservative	Barry F. Mason	405	
Conservative	Joshua R. Porter	391	
Green	Paul J. Gasson	383	16.07
SDP	Maureen Brennan	277	10.24
Tenants and Residents	Christine Clements	235	8.39
SDP	Fenella J. Durlacher	234	
SDP	Doris K.A. Rogers	222	
Tenants and Residents	William A. Maffreu	198	
Tenants and Residents	Sylvester Li	168	
Registered electors		4,913	
Turnout		2,285	46.51
Rejected ballots		7	0.31
Labour gain from Liberal Democrats			
Labour gain from Liberal Democrats			
Labour gain from Liberal Democrats			

=== St Peter ===
St Peter (3)
Party	Candidate	Votes	%
Liberal Democrats	Maria Powell*	1,648	44.36
Liberal Democrats	Christopher J. Pryce*	1,460	
Liberal Democrats	Stephen Hitchins	1,335	
Labour	Christina L. Glover	1,078	29.44
Labour	Piers M. Herbert	979	
Labour	Michael Boye-Anawomah	893	
Green	Hilary M. Nimmo	331	9.91
Conservative	Thomas R.M. Duke	315	9.01
Conservative	Alan M. Spinney	286	
Tenants and Residents	George A. Estcourt	243	7.28
Registered electors		6,314	
Turnout		3,149	49.87
Rejected ballots		9	0.29
Liberal Democrats hold			
Liberal Democrats hold			
Liberal Democrats hold			

=== Sussex ===
Sussex (2)
Party	Candidate	Votes	%
Labour	Margaret E. Hodge	1,261	66.56
Labour	Christopher M.B. King	1,194	
Green	Ronald I Fraser	341	18.48
Conservative	Ina Long	279	14.96
Conservative	Nigel V.A. Shervey	273	
Registered electors		4,286	
Turnout		1,947	45.43
Rejected ballots		10	0.51
Labour hold			
Labour hold			

=== Thornhill ===
Thornhill (2)
Party	Candidate	Votes	%
Labour	Ian P. Perry	1,301	63.77
Labour	Alan J. Laws	1,205	
Conservative	Stephen A. Kreppel	360	17.96
Green	Robin W. Latimer	359	18.27
Conservative	Stephen Heather	345	
Registered electors		4,575	
Turnout		1,975	43.17
Rejected ballots		4	0.20
Labour hold			
Labour hold			

=== Tollington ===
Tollington (3)
Party	Candidate	Votes	%
Labour	Elizabeth M. Davies	1,798	56.64
Labour	Susan A. Southgate	1,630	
Labour	Martin J. McCloghry	1,586	
Green	Janet L. Anderson	494	16.75
Tenants and Residents	Arthur Perry	327	9.86
Conservative	Diana Harrison	319	10.41
Conservative	Derek Harvey	314	
Conservative	Neil D. Kerr	289	
Tenant and Residents	Ramesh J. Joshi	288	
Tenants and Residents	Paul A. Stockton-Agostini	258	
Liberal Democrats	Elizabeth Mayer	217	6.34
Liberal Democrats	Matthew T. Ryan	181	
Liberal Democrats	Mark C. Thatcher	164	
Registered electors		6,672	
Turnout		2,876	43.11
Rejected ballots		25	0.87
Labour hold			
Labour hold			
Labour hold			
