= 2022 Islington London Borough Council election =

2022 local election in Islington

2022 Islington Council election
- 5 May 2022

All 51 council seats
	First party	Second party
Leader	Kaya Comer-Schwartz	Caroline Russell
Party	Labour	Green
Last election	47 seats, 60.6%	1 seat, 16.4%
Seats won	48	3
Seat change	▲1	▲2
Popular vote	80,582	33,279
Percentage	54.2%	22.4%
Swing	▼6.4%	▲6.0%
- Map of the results of the 2022 Islington council election. Greens in green and Labour in red.
council control before election
Labour
Subsequent council control
Labour

The 2022 Islington London Borough Council election took place on 5 May 2022. All 51 members of Islington London Borough Council were to be elected. The elections took place alongside local elections in the other London boroughs and elections to local authorities across the United Kingdom.

In the previous election in 2018, the Labour Party maintained its control of the council, winning 47 out of the 48 seats with the Green Party providing the only opposition councillor, Caroline Russell. The 2022 election took place under new election boundaries, with an increase in the number of councillors to 51.

== Background ==
=== History ===
Result of the 2018 borough election

The thirty-two London boroughs were established in 1965 by the London Government Act 1963. They are the principal authorities in Greater London and have responsibilities including education, housing, planning, highways, social services, libraries, recreation, waste, environmental health and revenue collection. Some of the powers are shared with the Greater London Authority, which also manages passenger transport, police and fire.

Since its formation, Islington has been under Labour control, Conservative control, Liberal Democrat control, Social Democratic Party control and no overall control. Labour most recently gained control of the council in the 2010 election, winning 35 seats to the Liberal Democrats' 13 seats. The Liberal Democrats lost all their remaining seats in the 2014 election, with Labour winning 47 and the Green Party's Caroline Russell winning a single seat in Highbury East. In the most recent election in 2018, Labour held their 47 seats with 60.6% of the vote across the borough while Russell held her seat for the Green Party, with the Greens winning 16.4% of the vote across the borough. The Liberal Democrats won 12.3% of the vote and the Conservatives won 9.7% of the vote, but neither won any seats.

=== Council term ===
A Labour councillor for St George's ward, Kat Fletcher, resigned in November 2019. A by-election to replace her was held on 12 December 2019, coinciding with the 2019 general election. The Labour candidate Gulcin Ozdemir, who worked as a social housing advocate, successfully defended the seat, with the Green Party candidate coming in second place.

Gary Poole, a Labour councillor, left his party to sit as an independent in July 2019 citing antisemitism, saying he hoped to rejoin in the future. In October 2020, the Labour councillor Rakhia Ismail left her party, saying she had faced racism in the party. She joined the Conservative Party in November 2020. A Labour councillor for Hollway ward, Paul Smith, resigned in January 2021.

A Labour councillor for Bunhill, Claudia Webbe, was elected as MP for Leicester East in the 2019 general election. She resigned as a councillor in March 2021 as a by-election to replace her was not possible until May 2021 due to the COVID-19 pandemic. In March 2021, three Labour councillors announced their resignations: Andy Hull of Highbury West ward because his family were moving to Morocco; Joe Calouri of Mildmay ward because of work and family commitments; and Vivien Cutler of St Peter's ward. By-elections for all five seats were held on 6 May 2021 alongside the 2021 London mayoral election and London Assembly election. Some of the elections were contested by independent candidates opposed to low traffic neighbourhoods. Labour held all five seats: Valerie Bossman-Quarshie won Bunhill, Bashir Ibrahim won Highbury West, Jason Jackson won Holloway, Angelo Weekes won Mildmay and Toby North won St Peter's. The Green Party came second in three wards and the Conservatives and Liberal Democrats came second in one ward each.

Richard Watts stood down as council leader and leader of the Labour group in 2021, and Kaya Comer-Schwartz was chosen unopposed to take over. Comer-Schwartz had served as deputy leader of the council since 2020 and had previously worked for a mental health charity.

As with most London boroughs, Islington will be electing its councillors under new boundaries decided by the Local Government Boundary Commission for England, which it produced after a period of consultation. The number of councillors will rise to 51, an increase from the previous 48, across seventeen three-councillor wards.

== Campaign ==
In March 2022, groups of residents supportive and opposed to Low Traffic Neighbourhood schemes protested Islington Town Hall ahead of a debate triggered by an anti-low traffic neighbourhood petition. One attendee, the driving instructor David Corringall, cited the schemes as the reason he was standing as a Conservative candidate.

== Electoral process ==
Islington, like other London borough councils, elects all of its councillors at once every four years. The previous election took place in 2018. This election used plurality block voting, with each ward being represented by three councillors. Electors had as many votes as there were councillors to be elected in their ward, with the top two or three being elected.

All registered electors (British, Irish, Commonwealth and European Union citizens) living in London aged 18 or over were entitled to vote in the election. People who lived at two addresses in different councils, such as university students with different term-time and holiday addresses, were entitled to be registered for and vote in elections in both local authorities. Voting in-person at polling stations took place from 7:00 to 22:00 on election day, and voters were able to apply for postal votes or proxy votes in advance of the election.

== Previous council composition ==
Council composition after the 2018 election

Council composition ahead of the 2022 election

After 2018 election		Before 2022 election	
Party	Seats	Party	Seats
Labour	47	Labour	45
Green	1	Green	1
		Conservative	1
		Independent	1

== Results summary ==
2022 Islington London Borough Council
Party	Seats	Gains	Losses	Net gain/loss	Seats %	Votes %	Votes	+/−
Labour	48	0	0	▲1	94.1	54.6	85,031	-6.0
Green	3	0	0	▲2	5.9	22.1	34,466	+5.7
Liberal Democrats	0	0	0	Steady	0.0	11.7	18,159	-0.6
Conservative	0	0	0	Steady	0.0	11.2	17,425	+1.5
Independent	0	0	0	Steady	0.0	0.2	270	N/A
Communist	0	0	0	Steady	0.0	0.1	97	N/A
TUSC	0	0	0	Steady	0.0	0.1	92	N/A
Reform	0	0	0	Steady	0.0	0.0	51	N/A
SDP	0	0	0	Steady	0.0	0.0	34	N/A

== Ward results ==
=== Arsenal ===
Arsenal (3)
Party	Candidate	Votes	%	±%
Labour	Fin Craig	1,808	55.2	
Labour	Bashir Ibrahim	1,801	55.0	
Labour	Roulin Khondoker	1,710	52.2	
Green	Nicola Baird	910	27.8	
Green	Mary De Cinque	710	21.7	
Green	Jeremy Drew	618	18.9	
Liberal Democrats	Gabby Mann	468	14.3	
Liberal Democrats	Barbara Smith	393	12.0	
Liberal Democrats	Philip Middleton	368	11.2	
Conservative	Mark Flynn	324	9.9	
Conservative	Rachel Henry	319	9.7	
Conservative	Ebu Cetinkaya	293	9.0	
Communist	Robin Talbot	97	3.0	
Turnout			36.9	
Labour win (new seat)				
Labour win (new seat)				
Labour win (new seat)				

=== Barnsbury ===
Barnsbury (3)
Party	Candidate	Votes	%	±%
Labour	Rowena Champion	1,754	57.3	
Labour	Jilani Chowdhury	1,565	51.1	
Labour	Praful Nargund	1,425	46.6	
Green	Carmela Jones	772	25.2	
Conservative	Vanessa Carson	560	18.3	
Conservative	Peter McMahon	505	16.5	
Conservative	Tam Kocak-Bass	498	16.3	
Liberal Democrats	Jeremy Hargreaves	454	14.8	
Green	John Hartley	440	14.4	
Liberal Democrats	Michael Champness	438	14.3	
Green	Jake Williams	412	13.5	
Liberal Democrats	Erwann Le Lannou	360	11.8	
Turnout			37.1	
Labour hold		Swing		
Labour hold		Swing		
Labour hold		Swing		

=== Bunhill ===
Bunhill (3)
Party	Candidate	Votes	%	±%
Labour	Valerie Bossman-Quarshie	1,277	61.5	
Labour	Troy Gallagher	1,174	56.6	
Labour	Philip Graham	1,057	50.9	
Green	Catherine Webb	382	18.4	
Conservative	Max Campbell	379	18.3	
Conservative	Zak Vora	337	16.2	
Conservative	Alyson Prince	336	16.2	
Green	Andrew Myer	285	13.7	
Liberal Democrats	John Kenny	252	12.1	
Liberal Democrats	Adrian Hall	245	11.8	
Green	Andrew Tobert	210	10.1	
Liberal Democrats	Robert Minikin	206	9.9	
Reform	David Small	51	2.5	
SDP	Jake Painter	34	1.6	
Turnout			30.3	
Labour hold		Swing		
Labour hold		Swing		
Labour hold		Swing		

=== Caledonian ===
Caledonian (3)
Party	Candidate	Votes	%	±%
Labour	Paul Convery	1,508	66.8	
Labour	Sara Hyde	1,490	66.0	
Labour	Una O'Halloran	1,450	64.2	
Green	Vivien Deloge	336	14.9	
Green	Alex Gordon	309	13.7	
Conservative	Stuart Cottis	289	12.8	
Green	Bernadette Wren	280	12.4	
Conservative	Simon Johnson	278	12.3	
Conservative	Amo Kalar	250	11.1	
Liberal Democrats	Madeleine Martin	204	9.0	
Liberal Democrats	Peter Bye	203	9.0	
Liberal Democrats	Walera Martynchyk	177	7.8	
Turnout			32.0	
Labour hold		Swing		
Labour hold		Swing		
Labour hold		Swing		

=== Canonbury ===
Canonbury (3)
Party	Candidate	Votes	%	±%
Labour	Clare Jeapes	1,609	54.4	
Labour	Nick Wayne	1,445	48.8	
Labour	John Woolf	1,401	47.3	
Conservative	Michael Jefferson	557	18.8	
Green	Talia Hussain	543	18.3	
Conservative	Haiwei Li	539	18.2	
Green	Chloe Rice	526	17.8	
Conservative	Joe Mehmet	524	17.7	
Liberal Democrats	Emma Richardson	470	15.9	
Liberal Democrats	James Bacchus	435	14.7	
Liberal Democrats	Samuel Coldicutt	419	14.2	
Green	Chris Radway	410	13.9	
Turnout			33.8	
Labour hold		Swing		
Labour hold		Swing		
Labour hold		Swing		

=== Clerkenwell ===
Clerkenwell (3)
Party	Candidate	Votes	%	±%
Labour	Ruth Hayes	1,352	54.1	
Labour	Ben Mackmurdie	1,209	48.4	
Labour	Matt Nathan	1,199	48.0	
Green	Bronwen James	473	18.9	
Liberal Democrats	George Allan	458	18.3	
Green	Janet Gormley	453	18.1	
Liberal Democrats	Helen Redesdale	416	16.7	
Conservative	Alexander Baker	406	16.3	
Liberal Democrats	Jason Vickers	405	16.2	
Conservative	Lewis Cox	404	16.2	
Conservative	Mags Joseph	379	15.2	
Green	Cecilie Hestbaek	340	13.6	
Turnout			33.7	
Labour hold		Swing		
Labour hold		Swing		
Labour hold		Swing		

=== Finsbury Park ===
Finsbury Park (3)
Party	Candidate	Votes	%	±%
Labour	Asima Shaikh	1,941	68.6	
Labour	Gary Heather	1,905	67.3	
Labour	Mick O'Sullivan	1,759	62.1	
Green	Helena McKeown	579	20.5	
Green	Natalie Koffman	527	18.6	
Green	Timothy Fry	444	15.7	
Independent	Sadia Ali	270	9.5	
Liberal Democrats	Heather Eggins	243	8.6	
Liberal Democrats	Keith Sharp	195	6.9	
Conservative	William Howard	166	5.9	
Conservative	Katherine Mulhern	166	5.9	
Conservative	Henry Mitson	158	5.6	
Liberal Democrats	Paul Smith	139	4.9	
Turnout			31.9	
Labour hold		Swing		
Labour hold		Swing		
Labour hold		Swing		

=== Highbury ===
Highbury (3)
Party	Candidate	Votes	%	±%
Green	Caroline Russell*	2,282	52.5	
Green	Benali Hamdache	1,934	44.5	
Green	Ernestas Jegorovas-Armstrong	1,803	41.5	
Labour	Sue Lukes*	1,574	36.2	
Labour	Minda Burgos-Lukes	1,507	34.7	
Labour	Talal Karim	1,367	31.5	
Liberal Democrats	Ketish Pothalingam	521	12.0	
Liberal Democrats	Philip Stevens	498	11.5	
Liberal Democrats	Paul Symes	408	9.4	
Conservative	Mark Eldridge	384	8.8	
Conservative	Robert Deering	381	8.8	
Conservative	Laura Knightley	379	8.7	
Turnout			44.7	
Green win (new seat)				
Green win (new seat)				
Green win (new seat)				

=== Hillrise ===
Hillrise (3)
Party	Candidate	Votes	%	±%
Labour	Dave Poyser	2,453	66.3	
Labour	Michelline Ngongo	2,450	66.2	
Labour	Marian Spall	2,429	65.7	
Green	Susan Lees	840	22.7	
Green	Leah Partridge	701	18.9	
Green	Niall Creech	656	17.7	
Liberal Democrats	Mark Pack	386	10.4	
Liberal Democrats	Paul Massey	305	8.2	
Conservative	Jon Harrison	252	6.8	
Conservative	Janet Cronshaw	250	6.8	
Conservative	Rastgon Aziz	238	6.4	
Liberal Democrats	Paul Smith	139	3.8	
Turnout			36.4	
Labour hold		Swing		
Labour hold		Swing		
Labour hold		Swing		

=== Holloway ===
Holloway (3)
Party	Candidate	Votes	%	±%
Labour	Jason Jackson	1,863	64.9	
Labour	Claire Zammit	1,847	64.3	
Labour	Diarmaid Ward	1,792	62.4	
Green	Claire Poyner	532	18.5	
Green	Nikita Desai	531	18.5	
Green	William English	352	12.3	
Liberal Democrats	Mark Atkinson	322	11.2	
Conservative	Andrew Harrison	284	9.9	
Liberal Democrats	Andrew Hyett	263	9.2	
Conservative	Justin Rigby	256	8.9	
Conservative	John Wilkin	243	8.5	
Liberal Democrats	Christopher Johnson	241	8.4	
TUSC	Omer Esen	92	3.2	
Turnout			35.7	
Labour hold		Swing		
Labour hold		Swing		
Labour hold		Swing		

=== Junction ===
Junction (3)
Party	Candidate	Votes	%	±%
Labour	Janet Burgess	2,111	68.0	
Labour	Kaya Comer-Schwartz	2,004	64.5	
Labour	Sheila Chapman	2,001	64.4	
Green	Olivia Brunning	761	24.5	
Green	Paul Elliott	545	17.6	
Green	David Zell	507	16.3	
Conservative	Kim Andrews	279	9.0	
Conservative	Jonathan Elvin	252	8.1	
Liberal Democrats	Stefan Kasprzyk	240	7.7	
Conservative	Nigel Seay	240	7.7	
Liberal Democrats	Jonathan Taylor	194	6.2	
Liberal Democrats	Ufi Ibrahim	182	5.9	
Turnout			35.3	
Labour hold		Swing		
Labour hold		Swing		
Labour hold		Swing		

=== Laycock ===
Laycock (3)
Party	Candidate	Votes	%	±%
Labour	Heather Staff	1,622	59.1	
Labour	Ilkay Cinko-Oner	1,603	58.4	
Labour	Nurullah Turan	1,506	54.8	
Green	Jenni Chan	603	22.0	
Green	Jara Falkenburg	506	18.4	
Green	Nathan Stilwell	390	14.2	
Conservative	David Corrigall	369	13.4	
Conservative	Alexandra Eldridge	367	13.4	
Conservative	Ewan MacLeod	358	13.0	
Liberal Democrats	Pierre Delarue	341	12.4	
Liberal Democrats	David Sant	302	11.0	
Liberal Democrats	Jack Taylor	273	9.9	
Turnout			33.1	
Labour win (new seat)				
Labour win (new seat)				
Labour win (new seat)				

=== Mildmay ===
Mildmay (3)
Party	Candidate	Votes	%	±%
Labour	Jenny Kay	1,960	62.3	
Labour	Santiago Bell-Bradford	1,893	60.2	
Labour	Angelo Weekes	1,737	55.2	
Green	Zoe Alzamora	780	24.8	
Green	Conor Moloney	571	18.2	
Green	Dudley Ross	513	16.3	
Conservative	Caroline Gallagher	351	11.2	
Liberal Democrats	Nadine Mellor	340	10.8	
Liberal Democrats	Julie Whittaker	330	10.5	
Conservative	Thomas Hamilton	328	10.4	
Liberal Democrats	John Cotton	319	10.1	
Conservative	Pedro Capitani	316	10.0	
Turnout			33.7	
Labour hold		Swing		
Labour hold		Swing		
Labour hold		Swing		

=== St Mary's & St James' ===
St Mary's & St James' (3)
Party	Candidate	Votes	%	±%
Labour	Hannah McHugh	1,421	42.9	
Labour	Joseph Croft	1,320	39.8	
Labour	Saiqa Pandor	1,269	38.3	
Liberal Democrats	Kate Pothalingam	1,158	34.9	
Liberal Democrats	Terry Stacy	1,011	30.5	
Liberal Democrats	Maxx Turing	991	29.9	
Green	Joy Hinson	564	17.0	
Conservative	Bex Kelly	519	15.7	
Conservative	Harry Nugent	494	14.9	
Conservative	Will Woodroofe	446	13.5	
Green	Chris Procter	423	12.8	
Green	Adrian Williams	324	9.8	
Turnout			41.2	
Labour win (new seat)				
Labour win (new seat)				
Labour win (new seat)				

=== St Peter's & Canalside ===
St Peter's & Canalside (3)
Party	Candidate	Votes	%	±%
Labour	Martin Klute	1,228	50.8	
Labour	Rosaline Ogunro	1,183	48.9	
Labour	Toby North	1,175	48.6	
Conservative	Muhammad Kalaam	551	22.8	
Conservative	Nick Brainsby	525	21.7	
Conservative	Jack Gilmore	522	21.6	
Liberal Democrats	Sarah Ludford	449	18.6	
Liberal Democrats	Hilly Janes	358	14.8	
Green	Sophie Van Der Ham	353	14.6	
Green	Wendy Proudfoot	336	13.9	
Green	Jonathan Deamer	302	12.5	
Liberal Democrats	Caspar Woolley	274	11.3	
Turnout			33.1	
Labour win (new seat)				
Labour win (new seat)				
Labour win (new seat)				

=== Tollington ===
Tollington (3)
Party	Candidate	Votes	%	±%
Labour	Anjna Khurana	2,148	63.1	
Labour	Flora Williamson	2,093	61.5	
Labour	Mick Gilgunn	2,018	59.3	
Green	Ann Boater	1,064	31.3	
Green	Jonathan Ward	767	22.5	
Green	Robin Latimer	710	20.9	
Liberal Democrats	Lidia Erlichman	286	8.4	
Liberal Democrats	Julian Gregory	256	7.5	
Liberal Democrats	Jame Nicolov	234	6.9	
Conservative	Steve McMinnies	220	6.5	
Conservative	Andrea O'Halloran	214	6.3	
Conservative	Retha Mhach	203	6.0	
Turnout			36.2	
Labour hold		Swing		
Labour hold		Swing		
Labour hold		Swing		

=== Tufnell Park ===
Tufnell Park (3)
Party	Candidate	Votes	%	±%
Labour	Tricia Clarke	2,002	53.1	
Labour	Satnam Gill	1,887	50.1	
Labour	Gulcin Ozdemir*	1,728	45.8	
Green	Devon Osborne	1,604	42.6	
Green	Rod Gonggrijp	1,568	41.6	
Green	Jon Nott	1,393	37.0	
Conservative	Tracy Flynn	208	5.5	
Liberal Democrats	Rupert Redesdale	202	5.4	
Liberal Democrats	David Wilson	201	5.3	
Liberal Democrats	Axel Koelsch	187	5.0	
Conservative	Caitlin Smith	168	4.5	
Conservative	Jonathan Lang	161	4.3	
Turnout			44.1	
Labour win (new seat)				
Labour win (new seat)				
Labour win (new seat)				

== Changes 2022–2026 ==
Hillrise by-election, 2 May 2024
Party	Candidate	Votes	%	±%
Labour	Ollie Steadman	2,824	62.8	▼3.3
Green	Alex Nettle	1,095	24.3	▲4.5
Liberal Democrats	Rebecca Taylor	577	12.8	▲5.3
Turnout		4,597	47.3	
Labour hold				

The Hillrise by-election was triggered by the resignation of Labour councillor Dave Poyser.

Hillrise by-election, 15 August 2024
Party	Candidate	Votes	%	±%
Labour	Shreya Nanda	968	43.35	▼19.5
Independent	Alison Stoker	539	24.1	N/A
Liberal Democrats	Imogen Wall	350	15.67	▲3.5
Green	Alex Nettle	322	14.42	▼9.9
Independent	Maxim Parr-Reid	54	2.4	N/A
Turnout		2,243	20.5	▼26.8
Labour hold				

The by-election took place on 15 August 2024, following the resignation of Labour Councillor Ollie Steadman after serving 69 days since the May 2024 by-election.

Junction by-election, 28 November 2024
Party	Candidate	Votes	%	±%
Labour	James Potts	785	40.4	▼22.0
Independent	Jackson Caines	550	28.3	N/A
Green	Devon Osborne	219	11.3	▼11.2
Liberal Democrats	Rebecca Jones	156	8.0	▲0.9
Conservative	John Wilkin	113	5.8	▼2.1
Independent	Brian Potter	97	5.0	N/A
Socialist (GB)	Bill Martin	22	1.1	N/A
Turnout		1946		
Labour hold				
