= St Peter's and Canalside =

- Electoral ward for the Islington London Borough Council
- St Peter's and Canalside ward boundaries since 2022
- Borough: Islington
- County: Greater London
- Population: 11,622 (2021) (Note: 2021 Census data reported for 2022 ward boundaries)
- Electorate: 7,627 (2022)
- Area: 0.6458 square kilometres (0.2493 sq mi)

Current electoral ward
- Created: 2022
- Councillors: 3
- Created from: Bunhill, Clerkenwell and St Peter's
- GSS code: E05013711

St Peter's and Canalside is an electoral ward in the London Borough of Islington. The ward was first used in the 2022 elections. It returns three councillors to Islington London Borough Council.

== List of councillors ==
Term	Councillor	Party
2022–present	Martin Klute	Labour
2022–present	Rosaline Ogunro	Labour
2022–present	Toby North	Labour

== Islington council elections ==
=== 2022 election ===
The election took place on 5 May 2022.

2022 Islington London Borough Council election: St Peter's and Canalside (3)
Party	Candidate	Votes	%	±%
Labour	Martin Klute	1,228	50.8	
Labour	Rosaline Ogunro	1,183	48.9	
Labour	Toby North	1,175	48.6	
Conservative	Muhammad Kalaam	551	22.8	
Conservative	Nick Brainsby	525	21.7	
Conservative	Jack Gilmore	522	21.6	
Liberal Democrats	Sarah Ludford	449	18.6	
Liberal Democrats	Hilly Janes	358	14.8	
Green	Sophie Van Der Ham	353	14.6	
Green	Wendy Proudfoot	336	13.9	
Green	Jonathan Deamer	302	12.5	
Liberal Democrats	Caspar Woolley	274	11.3	
Turnout			33.1	
Labour win (new seat)				
Labour win (new seat)				
Labour win (new seat)				
