= Finsbury Park (ward) =

Electoral ward in London, England

- Electoral ward for the Islington London Borough Council
- Borough: Islington
- County: Greater London
- Population: 14,646 (2021)
- Major settlements: Finsbury Park
- Area: 0.8489 km²

Current electoral ward
- Created: 2002
- Number of members: 3
- Councillors: Asima Shaikh; Gary Heather; Mick O'Sullivan

Finsbury Park is an electoral ward in the London Borough of Islington. The ward was first used in the 2002 elections and elects three councillors to Islington London Borough Council.

== Geography ==
The ward is named after Finsbury Park.

== Councillors ==
Election	Councillors		
2022	Gary Heather (Labour)	Michael O'Sullivan (Labour)	Asima Shaikh (Labour)

== Elections ==
=== 2026 ===
2026 Islington London Borough Council election in Finsbury Park (3)
Party	Candidate	Votes	%	±%
Green	Caroline Allen			
Islington Community Independents	Amu Gib			
Green	Syreen Hassan			
Green	Natalie Koffman			
Reform	Jonathan Lang			
Conservative	Pauline Lewis			
Independent	Sharon Matthew			
Conservative	Stephen McMinnies			
Liberal Democrats	Amelia Mitford			
Labour	Portia Msimang			
Reform	Angela Nicolaou			
Labour	Mick O'Sullivan			
Labour	Gulcin Ozdemir			
Liberal Democrats	Edwin Smith			
Liberal Democrats	Daniel Thomas			
Conservative	Chris Williams			
Independent	Sadiq Yusuf			

=== 2022 ===
Finsbury Park (3)
Party	Candidate	Votes	%	±%
Labour	Asima Shaikh	1,941	68.6	
Labour	Gary Heather	1,905	67.3	
Labour	Mick O'Sullivan	1,759	62.1	
Green	Helena McKeown	579	20.5	
Green	Natalie Koffman	527	18.6	
Green	Timothy Fry	444	15.7	
Independent	Sadia Ali	270	9.5	
Liberal Democrats	Heather Eggins	243	8.6	
Liberal Democrats	Keith Sharp	195	6.9	
Conservative	William Howard	166	5.9	
Conservative	Katherine Mulhern	166	5.9	
Conservative	Henry Mitson	158	5.6	
Liberal Democrats	Paul Smith	139	4.9	
Turnout			31.9	
Labour hold		Swing		
Labour hold		Swing		
Labour hold		Swing		

== See also ==
- List of electoral wards in Greater London
