= Arsenal (ward) =

- Electoral ward for the Islington London Borough Council
- Arsenal ward boundaries since 2022
- Borough: Islington
- County: Greater London
- Population: 13,125 (2021) (Note: 2021 Census data reported for 2022 ward boundaries)
- Electorate: 9,073 (2022)
- Area: 0.8155 square kilometres (0.3149 sq mi)

Current electoral ward
- Created: 2022
- Number of members: 3
- Councillors: Fin Craig; Patrick Brighty; Nafisah Brown
- Created from: Highbury West
- GSS code: E05013697

Arsenal is an electoral ward in the London Borough of Islington. The ward was first used in the 2022 elections. It returns three councillors to Islington London Borough Council.

== List of councillors ==
Election	Councillors		
2022	Fin Craig (Labour Party)	Bashir Ibrahim (Labour Party)	Roulin Khondoker (Labour Party)
2026	Fin Craig (Labour Party)	Patrick Brighty (Green Party)	Nafisah Brown (Green Party)

== Islington council elections ==
=== 2022 election ===
The election took place on 5 May 2022.

2022 Islington London Borough Council election: Arsenal (3)
Party	Candidate	Votes	%	±%
Labour	Fin Craig	1,808	55.2	
Labour	Bashir Ibrahim	1,801	55.0	
Labour	Roulin Khondoker	1,710	52.2	
Green	Nicola Baird	910	27.8	
Green	Mary De Cinque	710	21.7	
Green	Jeremy Drew	618	18.9	
Liberal Democrats	Gabby Mann	468	14.3	
Liberal Democrats	Barbara Smith	393	12.0	
Liberal Democrats	Philip Middleton	368	11.2	
Conservative	Mark Flynn	324	9.9	
Conservative	Rachel Henry	319	9.7	
Conservative	Ebu Cetinkaya	293	9.0	
Communist	Robin Talbot	97	3.0	
Turnout			36.9	
Labour win (new seat)				
Labour win (new seat)				
Labour win (new seat)				
