= Sara Hyde, Baroness Hyde of Bemerton =

British politician

The Right Honourable The Baroness Hyde of Bemerton
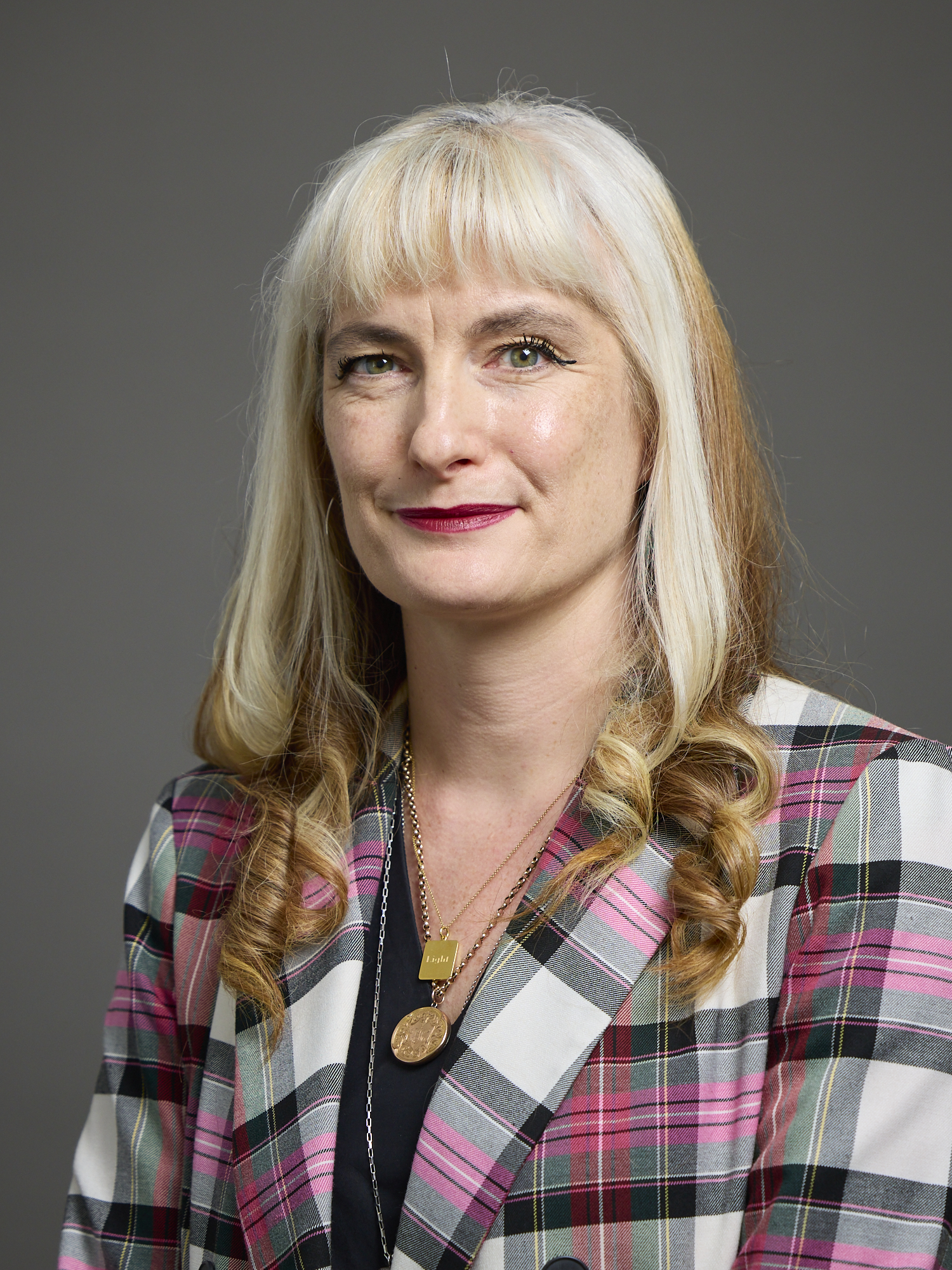
- Official portrait, 2026

Member of the House of Lords
- Lord Temporal
- Life peerage 12 January 2026

Member of Islington London Borough Council for Caledonian ward
- Incumbent
- Assumed office 3 May 2018

Personal details
- Party: Labour

Sara Kathryn Sabiers Hyde, Baroness Hyde of Bemerton is a British politician from the Labour Party.

== Career ==
Sara Hyde is chair of the Fabian Society. She is a former prison worker. She works with women in the criminal justice system and as a theatre maker.

Hyde is a member of Islington London Borough Council and Executive Member for Health and Social Care. She represents Caledonian ward. She was first elected in 2018.

Hyde was the Labour candidate in Bromley and Chislehurst in the 2017 United Kingdom general election. She was nominated for a life peerage in 2025 Political Peerages. On 12 January 2026, she was created Baroness Hyde of Bemerton, of King’s Cross in the London Borough of Islington. She made her maiden speech on 30 January 2026.

On 21 July 2026, she was appointed to the Burnham ministry as a Baroness in Waiting.
