= Tufnell Park (ward) =

Electoral ward in London, England

- Electoral ward for the Islington London Borough Council
- Borough: Islington
- County: Greater London
- Population: 12,395 (2021)
- Major settlements: Tufnell Park
- Area: 0.8459 km²

Current electoral ward
- Created: 2022
- Councillors: 3

Tufnell Park is an electoral ward in the London Borough of Islington. The ward was first used in the 2022 elections and elects three councillors to Islington London Borough Council.

== Geography ==
The ward is named after Tufnell Park.

== Councillors ==
Election	Councillors		
2022	Tricia Clarke (Labour)	Satnam Gill (Labour)	Gulcin Ozdemir (Labour)

== Elections ==
=== 2022 ===
Tufnell Park (3)
Party	Candidate	Votes	%	±%
Labour	Tricia Clarke	2,002	53.1	
Labour	Satnam Gill	1,887	50.1	
Labour	Gulcin Ozdemir*	1,728	45.8	
Green	Devon Osborne	1,604	42.6	
Green	Rod Gonggrijp	1,568	41.6	
Green	Jon Nott	1,393	37.0	
Conservative	Tracy Flynn	208	5.5	
Liberal Democrats	Rupert Redesdale	202	5.4	
Liberal Democrats	David Wilson	201	5.3	
Liberal Democrats	Axel Koelsch	187	5.0	
Conservative	Caitlin Smith	168	4.5	
Conservative	Jonathan Lang	161	4.3	
Turnout			44.1	
Labour win (new seat)				
Labour win (new seat)				
Labour win (new seat)				

== See also ==
- List of electoral wards in Greater London
