= Canonbury (ward) =

Electoral ward in London, England

- Electoral ward for the Islington London Borough Council
- Borough: Islington
- County: Greater London
- Population: 12,666 (2021)
- Major settlements: Canonbury
- Area: 0.8715 km²

Current electoral ward
- Created: 2002
- Number of members: 3 (since 2002); 4 (1964 to 1978)
- Councillors: Clare Jeapes; Nick Wayne; Hayden Banks

Canonbury is an electoral ward in the London Borough of Islington. The ward was first used in the 2002 elections and elects three councillors to Islington London Borough Council. It was previously used from 1965 to 1978.

== Geography ==
The ward is named after the area of Canonbury.

== Councillors ==
Election	Councillors		
2002	Jonathan Dearth (Lib Dem)	Lucy Watt (Lib Dem)	Barbara Smith (Lib Dem)
2006	Paula Belford (Lib Dem)	Lucy Watt (Lib Dem)	Barbara Smith (Lib Dem)
2010	Paula Belford (Lib Dem)	Wally Burgess (Labour)	Faye Whaley (Labour)
2014	Clare Jeapes (Labour)	Nick Wayne (Labour)	Alexander Diner (Labour)
2018	Clare Jeapes (Labour)	Nick Wayne (Labour)	John Woolf (Labour)
2022	Clare Jeapes (Labour)	Nick Wayne (Labour)	John Woolf (Labour)
2026	Clare Jeapes (Labour)	Nick Wayne (Labour)	Hayden Banks (Green)

== Elections ==
=== 2022 ===
Canonbury (3)
Party	Candidate	Votes	%	±%
Labour	Clare Jeapes	1,609	54.4	
Labour	Nick Wayne	1,445	48.8	
Labour	John Woolf	1,401	47.3	
Conservative	Michael Jefferson	557	18.8	
Green	Talia Joan Hussain	543	18.3	
Conservative	Haiwei Li	539	18.2	
Green	Chloe Rice	526	17.8	
Conservative	Joe Mehmet	524	17.7	
Liberal Democrats	Emma Elizabeth Victoria Richardson	470	15.9	
Liberal Democrats	James Robert Bacchus	435	14.7	
Liberal Democrats	Samuel James Addison Coldicutt	419	14.2	
Green	Chris Radway	410	13.9	
Turnout			33.8	
Labour hold		Swing		
Labour hold		Swing		
Labour hold		Swing		

== See also ==
- List of electoral wards in Greater London
