= Caledonian (ward) =

Electoral ward in London, England

- Electoral ward for the Islington London Borough Council
- Borough: Islington
- County: Greater London
- Population: 11,579 (2021)
- Major settlements: Caledonian Estate
- Area: 0.9012 km²

Current electoral ward
- Created: 2002
- Councillors: 3

Caledonian is an electoral ward in the London Borough of Islington. The ward was first used in the 2002 elections and elects three councillors to Islington London Borough Council.

== Geography ==
The ward is named after the Caledonian Road.

== Councillors ==
Election	Councillors		
2022	Paul Convery (Labour)	Sara Hyde (Labour)	Una O'Halloran (Labour)

== Elections ==
=== 2022 ===
Caledonian (3)
Party	Candidate	Votes	%	±%
Labour	Paul Edmond Convery	1,508	66.8	
Labour	Sara Kathryn Sabres Hyde	1,490	66.0	
Labour	Una Mary O'Halloran	1,450	64.2	
Green	Vivien Deloge	336	14.9	
Green	Alex Gordon	309	13.7	
Conservative	Stuart Cottis	289	12.8	
Green	Bernadette Ann Wren	280	12.4	
Conservative	Simon William Johnson	278	12.3	
Conservative	Amo Kalar	250	11.1	
Liberal Democrats	Madeleine Isobel Martin	204	9.0	
Liberal Democrats	Peter Gorden Bye	203	9.0	
Liberal Democrats	Walera Martynchyk	177	7.8	
Turnout			32.0	
Labour hold		Swing		
Labour hold		Swing		
Labour hold		Swing		

=== 2018 ===
Caledonian
Party	Candidate	Votes	%	±%
Labour	Paul Convery	2,158	67.5	+1.4
Labour	Sara Hyde	2,149	67.2	+12.8
Labour	Una O'Halloran	2,011	62.9	+9.8
Conservative	Peter Balchin	405	12.7	+0.6
Green	Alex Gordon	389	12.2	−6.5
Conservative	Stuart Cottis	365	11.4	−2.3
Conservative	Ashley Durwood-Thomas	334	10.4	−1.2
Liberal Democrats	Tricia Peel	329	10.3	−0.3
Liberal Democrats	Emma Borroff	314	9.8	+0.9
Green	Hannah Graham	307	9.6	−6.7
Green	Morgan Phillips	284	8.9	−3.4
Liberal Democrats	Hamir Patel	252	7.9	+0.9
Turnout				
Labour hold		Swing		
Labour hold		Swing		
Labour hold		Swing		

== See also ==
- List of electoral wards in Greater London
