= St Mary's and St James' =

Electoral ward in London, England

- Electoral ward for the Islington London Borough Council
- Borough: Islington
- County: Greater London
- Population: 11,888 (2021)
- Area: 0.7757 km²

Current electoral ward
- Created: 2022
- Councillors: 3

St Mary's and St James' is an electoral ward in the London Borough of Islington. The ward was first used in the 2022 elections and elects three councillors to Islington London Borough Council.

== Geography ==
The ward is named after St Mary's and St James'.

== Councillors ==
Election	Councillors		
2022	Hannah McHugh (Labour)	Joseph Croft (Labour)	Saiqa Pandor (Labour)

== Elections ==
=== 2022 ===
St Mary's & St James' (3)
Party	Candidate	Votes	%	±%
Labour	Hannah McHugh	1,421	42.9	
Labour	Joseph Croft	1,320	39.8	
Labour	Saiqa Pandor	1,269	38.3	
Liberal Democrats	Kate Pothalingam	1,158	34.9	
Liberal Democrats	Terry Stacy	1,011	30.5	
Liberal Democrats	Maxx Turing	991	29.9	
Green	Joy Hinson	564	17.0	
Conservative	Bex Kelly	519	15.7	
Conservative	Harry Nugent	494	14.9	
Conservative	Will Woodroofe	446	13.5	
Green	Chris Procter	423	12.8	
Green	Adrian Williams	324	9.8	
Turnout			41.2	
Labour win (new seat)				
Labour win (new seat)				
Labour win (new seat)				

== See also ==
- List of electoral wards in Greater London
