= Laycock (ward) =

Electoral ward in London, England

- Electoral ward for the Islington London Borough Council
- Borough: Islington
- County: Greater London
- Population: 12,441 (2021)
- Area: 0.8096 km²

Current electoral ward
- Created: 2022
- Number of members: 3
- Councillors: Heather Staff; Maia Hamilton; Nurullah Turan

Laycock is an electoral ward in the London Borough of Islington. The ward was first used in the 2022 elections and elects three councillors to Islington London Borough Council.

== Geography ==
The ward is named after Laycock Green.

== Councillors ==
Election	Councillors		
2022	Ilkay Cinko-Oner (Labour) (Independent since 2025)	Heather Staff (Labour)	Nurullah Turan (Labour)
2026	Maia Hamilton (Labour)	Heather Staff (Labour)	Nurullah Turan (Labour)

== Elections ==
=== 2026 ===
Laycock (3)
Party	Candidate	Votes	%	±%
Labour	Maia Hamilton	1,245	41.4	▼17.7
Labour	Heather Staff	1,210	40.2	▼18.2
Labour	Nurullah Turan	1,149	38.2	▼16.6
Green	Joy Hinson	1,137	37.8	▲15.8
Green	Rasan Naji	890	29.6	▲11.2
Green	Joseph Walker	847	28.2	▲14.0
Islington Community Independents	Ilkay Cinko-Oner	410	13.6	N/A
Reform	Cheryl Rands	387	12.9	N/A
Conservative	Andrew Harrison	308	10.2	▼3.2
Conservative	Margaret Joseph	267	8.9	▼4.5
Liberal Democrats	Sakina Chenot	262	8.7	▼3.7
Liberal Democrats	Matthew Dendy	246	8.2	▼2.8
Liberal Democrats	Patricia Peel	242	8.0	▼1.9
Conservative	Simon Toms	239	7.9	▼5.1
Independent	John Doherty	92	3.1	N/A
Independent	Andrew Parry	88	2.9	N/A
Turnout			40.5	+7.4
Labour hold		Swing		
Labour gain from Independent		Swing		
Labour hold		Swing		

=== 2022 ===
Laycock (3)
Party	Candidate	Votes	%	±%
Labour	Heather Staff	1,622	59.1	
Labour	Ilkay Cinko-Oner	1,603	58.4	
Labour	Nurullah Turan	1,506	54.8	
Green	Jenni Chan	603	22.0	
Green	Jara Falkenburg	506	18.4	
Green	Nathan Stilwell	390	14.2	
Conservative	David Corrigall	369	13.4	
Conservative	Alexandra Catherine Eldridge	367	13.4	
Conservative	Ewan MacLeod	358	13.0	
Liberal Democrats	Pierre Daniel Delarue	341	12.4	
Liberal Democrats	David Sant	302	11.0	
Liberal Democrats	Jack Charlie Taylor	273	9.9	
Turnout			33.1	
Labour win (new seat)				
Labour win (new seat)				
Labour win (new seat)				

== See also ==
- List of electoral wards in Greater London
