= Mildmay (ward) =

Electoral ward in London, England

- Electoral ward for the Islington London Borough Council
- Borough: Islington
- County: Greater London
- Population: 14,266 (2021)
- Major settlements: Mildmay, Islington
- Area: 0.8763 km²

Current electoral ward
- Created: 1965
- Councillors: 3 (since 1978); 4 (until 1978)

Mildmay is an electoral ward in the London Borough of Islington. The ward was first used in the 1964 elections and elects three councillors to Islington London Borough Council.

== Geography ==
The ward is named after Mildmay, Islington.

== Councillors ==
Election	Councillors		
2022	Jenny Kay (Labour)	Santiago Bell-Bradford (Labour)	Angelo Weekes (Labour)

== Elections ==
=== 2022 ===
Mildmay (3)
Party	Candidate	Votes	%	±%
Labour	Jenny Kay	1,960	62.3	
Labour	Santiago Jaime Andrew Bell-Bradford	1,893	60.2	
Labour	Angelo Ricardo Weekes	1,737	55.2	
Green	Zoe Esme Alzamora	780	24.8	
Green	Conor Moloney	571	18.2	
Green	Dudley Ross	513	16.3	
Conservative	Caroline Gallagher	351	11.2	
Liberal Democrats	Nadine Claire Mellor	340	10.8	
Liberal Democrats	Julie Yvonne Whittaker	330	10.5	
Conservative	Thomas Hamilton	328	10.4	
Liberal Democrats	John Cotton	319	10.1	
Conservative	Pedro Danilo Capitani	316	10.0	
Turnout			33.7	
Labour hold		Swing		
Labour hold		Swing		
Labour hold		Swing		

== See also ==
- List of electoral wards in Greater London
