= Holloway (ward) =

- Electoral ward for the Islington London Borough Council
- Holloway ward boundaries since 2022
- Borough: Islington
- County: Greater London
- Population: 12,737 (2021) (Note: 2021 Census data reported for 2022 ward boundaries)
- Electorate: 8,320 (2022)
- Major settlements: Holloway
- Area: 0.8069 square kilometres (0.3115 sq mi)

Current electoral ward
- Created: 1965
- Councillors: 1965–1978: 4; 1978–present: 3
- GSS code: E05013706 (2022–present)

Holloway is an electoral ward in the London Borough of Islington. The ward has existed since the creation of the borough on 1 April 1965 and was first used in the 1964 elections. It returns councillors to Islington London Borough Council.

It is part of the Islington South and Finsbury Parliamentary constituency and the North East London Assembly constituency. It is located in the lower Holloway area of Islington in North London in the United Kingdom. The population of the ward at the 2011 Census was 14,983. The ward is represented by three councillors, with elections held every four years.

== Islington council elections since 2022 ==
There was a revision of ward boundaries in Islington in 2022.

=== 2022 election ===
The election took place on 5 May 2022.

2022 Islington London Borough Council election: Holloway (3)
Party	Candidate	Votes	%	±%
Labour	Jason Jackson	1,863	64.9	
Labour	Claire Louise Zammit	1,847	64.3	
Labour	Diarmaid John Ward	1,792	62.4	
Green	Claire Louise Poyner	532	18.5	
Green	Nikita Hiren Desai	531	18.5	
Green	William Durrant English	352	12.3	
Liberal Democrats	Mark Atkinson	322	11.2	
Conservative	Andrew James Harrison	284	9.9	
Liberal Democrats	Andrew Charles Hyett	263	9.2	
Conservative	Justin Rigby	256	8.9	
Conservative	John Alan Wilkin	243	8.5	
Liberal Democrats	Christopher Timothy Forbes Johnson	241	8.4	
TUSC	Omer Esen	92	3.2	
Turnout			35.7	
Labour win (new boundaries)				
Labour win (new boundaries)				
Labour win (new boundaries)				

== 2002–2022 Islington council elections ==
Holloway ward boundaries from 2002 to 2022

There was a revision of ward boundaries in Islington in 2002.

=== 2018 election ===
The election took place on 3 May 2018.

2018 Islington London Borough Council election: Holloway (3)
Party	Candidate	Votes	%	±%
Labour	Rakhia Ismail	2,764	66.6	
Labour	Paul Smith	2,695	64.9	
Labour	Diarmaid Ward	2,665	64.2	
Green	Claire Poyner	547	13.2	
Liberal Democrats	Mark Atkinson	495	11.9	
Liberal Democrats	Alice Meek	483	11.6	
Green	Robert Magowan	468	11.3	
Liberal Democrats	David Kelly	431	10.4	
Conservative	Jonathan Lui	414	10.0	
Green	Jon Nott	379	9.1	
Conservative	Christina Michalos	368	8.9	
Conservative	Ian Singlehurst	365	8.8	
Turnout				
Labour hold		Swing		
Labour hold		Swing		
Labour hold		Swing		

In November 2020, Rakhia Ismail switched to the Conservative Party.

=== 2014 election ===
The election took place on 22 May 2014.

2014 Islington London Borough Council election: Holloway (3)
Party	Candidate	Votes	%	±%
Labour	Paul Smith	2,470		
Labour	Rakhia Ismail	2,266		
Labour	Diarmaid Ward	2,222		
Green	Jenni Chan	996		
Green	Claire Poyner	905		
Green	Ciaran Whitehead	837		
Liberal Democrats	Paul Martin Smith	564		
Liberal Democrats	Margot Dunn	564		
Liberal Democrats	David John Kelly	519		
Turnout		4,135	36.9	−22.9
Labour hold		Swing		
Labour hold		Swing		
Labour hold		Swing		

=== 2010 election ===
The election on 6 May 2010 took place on the same day as the United Kingdom general election.

2010 Islington London Borough Council election: Holloway (3)
Party	Candidate	Votes	%	±%
Labour	Barry Edwards	2,809		
Labour	Paul Smith	2,721		
Labour	Lucy Rigby	2,702		
Liberal Democrats	David Kelly	1,940		
Liberal Democrats	Andrea O'Halloran	1,715		
Liberal Democrats	Alan Muhammed	1,522		
Conservative	Elizabeth Eldridge	896		
Conservative	James Rooke	816		
Green	Claire Poyner	805		
Conservative	Paul Seligman	792		
Green	James O'Nions	646		
Green	Mark Chilver	636		
Turnout		18,000	59.8	+27.6
Labour hold		Swing		
Labour hold		Swing		
Labour hold		Swing		

=== 2006 election ===
The election took place on 4 May 2006.

2006 Islington London Borough Council election: Holloway (3)
Party	Candidate	Votes	%	±%
Labour	Natasha Chatterjee	934	38.2	
Labour	Barry Edwards	921		
Labour	Paul Smith	911		
Liberal Democrats	Michelle Allison	842	34.5	
Liberal Democrats	Margot Dunn	820		
Liberal Democrats	Iarla Kilbane-Dawe	732		
Green	Jennifer Chan	402	16.5	
Green	Claire Poyner	367		
Green	Pelham Davey	357		
Conservative	Andrew Austin	264	10.8	
Conservative	Paul Seligman	248		
Conservative	David Cheape	236		
Turnout		7,034	32.2	+5.3
Labour gain from Liberal Democrats		Swing		
Labour gain from Liberal Democrats		Swing		
Labour gain from Liberal Democrats		Swing		

=== 2002 election ===
The election took place on 2 May 2002.

2002 Islington London Borough Council election: Holloway (3)
Party	Candidate	Votes	%	±%
Liberal Democrats	Margot Dunn	1,103		
Liberal Democrats	Edward Featherstone	1,052		
Liberal Democrats	Doreen Scott	1,023		
Labour	Philip Kelly	632		
Labour	Michael Conneely	630		
Labour	Robert Marchant	585		
Green	Jennifer Chan	189		
Green	Claire Poyner	165		
Socialist Alliance	Elizabeth Clare	139		
CPA	David Curtis	122		
Socialist Alliance	Shirley Franklin	121		
Green	Neil Snaith	120		
Conservative	Kathryn Field	85		
Conservative	Stephen Phillips	83		
Conservative	Mark Seward	64		
Turnout		6,113	26.9	
Liberal Democrats win (new boundaries)				
Liberal Democrats win (new boundaries)				
Liberal Democrats win (new boundaries)				

== 1978–2002 Islington council elections ==
There was a revision of ward boundaries in Islington in 1978.

== 1964–1978 Islington council elections ==
=== 1964 election ===
The election took place on 7 May 1964.

1964 Islington London Borough Council election: Holloway (4)
Party	Candidate	Votes	%	±%
Labour	W. G. Baker	929		
Labour	F. H. Cantwell	920		
Labour	J. E. Woodhall	893		
Labour	V. F. Prythergch	879		
Conservative	M. M. Bourne	189		
Conservative	N. D. Champ	181		
Conservative	H. P. Stubbs	160		
Conservative	G. E. Leeson	149		
Communist	J. F. Moss	134		
Union Movement	R. S. Pegg	102		
Turnout		1,242	12.1	
Labour win (new seat)				
Labour win (new seat)				
Labour win (new seat)				
Labour win (new seat)				
