= Clerkenwell (ward) =

Electoral ward in North London, England

- Electoral ward for the Islington London Borough Council
- Clerkenwell ward boundaries since 2022
- Borough: Islington
- County: Greater London
- Population: 10,956 (2021) (Note: 2021 Census data reported for 2022 ward boundaries)
- Electorate: 7,597 (2022)
- Major settlements: Clerkenwell
- Area: 0.9316 square kilometres (0.3597 sq mi)

Current electoral ward
- Created: 1965
- Number of members: 3
- Councillors: Ruth Hayes; Jara Falkenburg; Giulio Ferrini
- GSS code: E05013702 (2022–present)

Clerkenwell is an electoral ward in the London Borough of Islington. The ward has existed since the creation of the borough on 1 April 1965 and was first used in the 1964 elections. It returns councillors to Islington London Borough Council.

== Islington council elections since 2022 ==
There was a revision of ward boundaries in Islington in 2022.

=== 2026 election ===
The election took place on 7 May 2026.

Clerkenwell (3)
Party	Candidate	Votes	%	±%
Green	Jara Falkenburg	1,146	42.7	▲23.8
Labour	Ruth Hayes*	1,141	42.5	▼11.6
Green	Giulio Ferrini	1,073	40.0	▲21.9
Labour	Andrew Clark	1,047	39.0	▼9.4
Green	Martin Murray	969	36.1	▲22.5
Labour	Ben Mackmurdie*	949	35.3	▼12.7
Liberal Democrats	Kevin Chun	404	15.0	▼3.3
Liberal Democrats	Alessandro Bonetti	403	15.0	▼1.7
Reform	Bill Cove	379	14.1	N/A
Reform	Martine Paulmier	372	13.9	N/A
Liberal Democrats	Jason Vickers	337	12.5	▼3.7
Conservative	Karen Hutchinson	239	8.9	▼7.4
Conservative	Alexander Lusty	213	7.9	▼8.3
Conservative	Mark Eldridge	141	5.3	▼9.9
National Housing Party	Grant Shimmen	68	2.5	N/A
Turnout			43.9	+10.2
Green gain from Labour		Swing	17.1	
Labour hold		Swing		
Green gain from Labour		Swing	17.1	

=== 2022 election ===
The election took place on 5 May 2022.

2022 Islington London Borough Council election: Clerkenwell (3)
Party	Candidate	Votes	%	±%
Labour	Ruth Hayes	1,352	54.1	
Labour	Ben Mackmurdie	1,209	48.4	
Labour	Matt Nathan	1,199	48.0	
Green	Bronwen James	473	18.9	
Liberal Democrats	George Edwin Allan	458	18.3	
Green	Janet Dowling Gormley	453	18.1	
Liberal Democrats	Helen Judith Redesdale	416	16.7	
Conservative	Alexander Jesse Baker	406	16.3	
Liberal Democrats	Jason Phillip Vickers	405	16.2	
Conservative	Lewis Anthony Cox	404	16.2	
Conservative	Mags Joseph	379	15.2	
Green	Cecilie Hestbaek	340	13.6	
Turnout			33.7	
Labour win (new boundaries)				
Labour win (new boundaries)				
Labour win (new boundaries)				

== 2002–2022 Islington council elections ==
Clerkenwell ward boundaries from 2002 to 2022

There was a revision of ward boundaries in Islington in 2002.

== 1978–2002 Islington council elections ==
Clerkenwell ward boundaries from 1978 to 1994

There was a revision of ward boundaries in Islington in 1978. There was a minor adjustment to the Clerkenwell ward boundary in 1994.

== 1964–1978 Islington council elections ==
=== 1964 election ===
The election took place on 7 May 1964.

1964 Islington London Borough Council election: Clerkenwell (3)
Party	Candidate	Votes	%	±%
Labour	C. Slater	943		
Labour	J. Trotter	926		
Labour	S. W. Withey	886		
Conservative	J. P. Smith	240		
Conservative	S. J. Thomas	240		
Conservative	M. J. Mason	232		
Liberal	C. Wicker	137		
Liberal	H. Wilson	131		
Liberal	D. Edwardes	106		
Turnout		1,318	16.2	
Labour win (new seat)				
Labour win (new seat)				
Labour win (new seat)				
