= Islington London Borough Council =

Government authority in England

Islington Council
- Coat of arms

Type
- Type: London borough council of the London Borough of Islington
- Houses: Unicameral

Leadership
- Mayor: Rosaline Ogunro, Labour since 27 May 2026
- Leader: Una O'Halloran, Labour since 19 November 2024
- Chief Executive: Victoria Lawson since 8 January 2024

Structure
- Seats: 51 councillors
- Political groups: Administration (32) Labour (32) Opposition (19) Green (19)
- Length of term: Whole council elected every four years

Elections
- Voting system: Plurality at-large (FPTP)
- Last election: 7 May 2026
- Next election: 2 May 2030

Meeting place
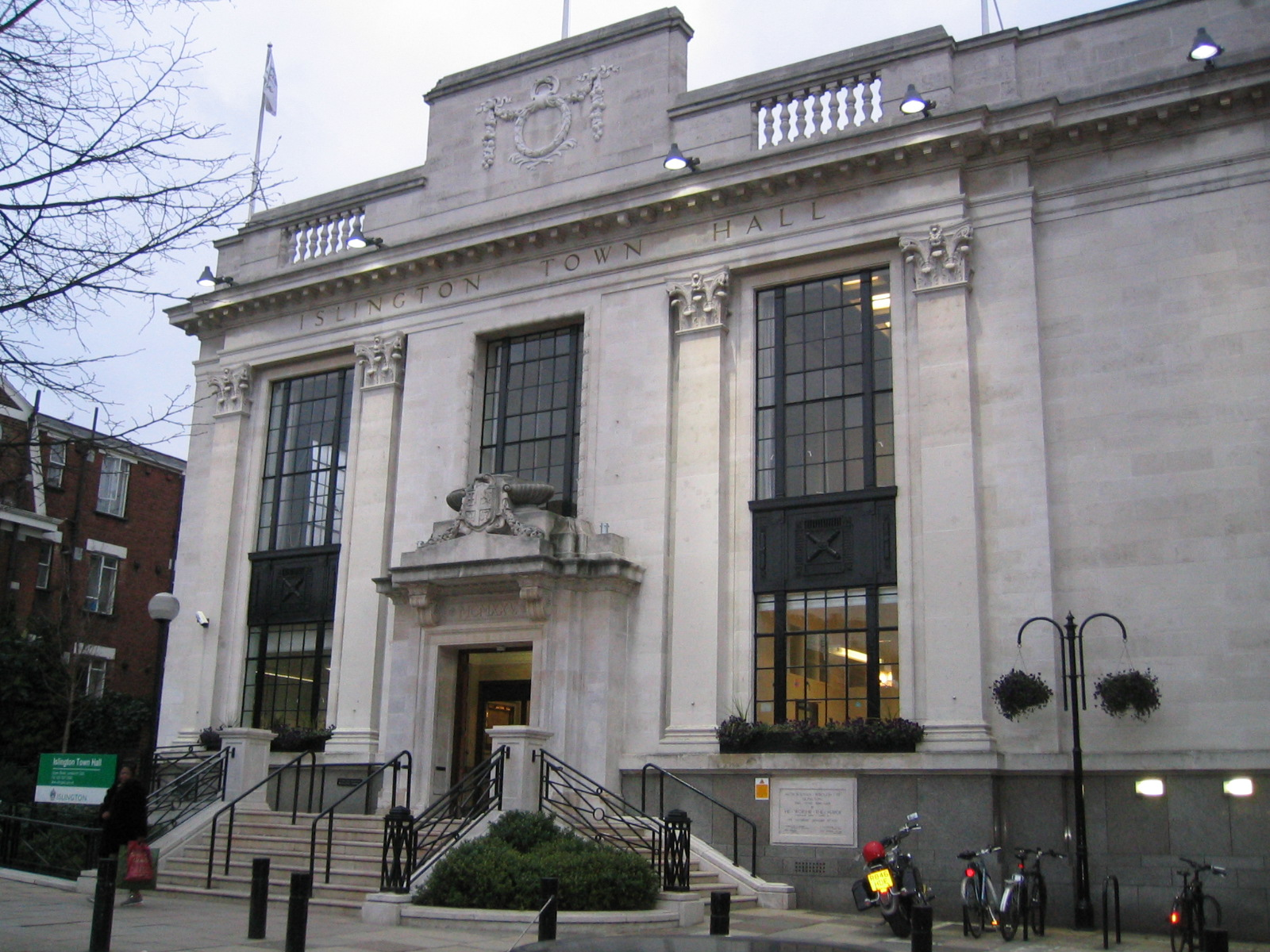
- Islington Town Hall, Upper Street, London, N1 2UD

Website
- www.islington.gov.uk

Islington London Borough Council, also known as Islington Council, is the local authority for the London Borough of Islington in Greater London, England. The council has been under Labour majority control since 2010. The council meets at Islington Town Hall.

== History ==
There has been an elected Islington local authority since 1856 when the vestry of the ancient parish of Islington was incorporated under the Metropolis Management Act 1855. The vestry served as one of the lower tier authorities within the area of the Metropolitan Board of Works, which was established to provide services across the metropolis of London. In 1889 the Metropolitan Board of Works' area was made the County of London. In 1900 the lower tier was reorganised into metropolitan boroughs, each with a borough council, two of which were called Islington (covering the parish of Islington) and Finsbury (covering a group of smaller parishes and territories south of Islington).

The London Borough of Islington and its council were created under the London Government Act 1963, with the first election held in 1964. For its first year the council acted as a shadow authority alongside the area's outgoing authorities, which were the councils of the two metropolitan boroughs of Islington and Finsbury. The new council formally came into its powers on 1 April 1965, at which point the old boroughs and their councils were abolished.

The council's full legal name is the "Mayor and Burgesses of the London Borough of Islington".

From 1965 until 1986 the council was a lower-tier authority, with upper-tier functions provided by the Greater London Council. The split of powers and functions meant that the Greater London Council was responsible for "wide area" services such as fire, ambulance, flood prevention, and refuse disposal; with the boroughs (including Islington) responsible for "personal" services such as social care, libraries, cemeteries and refuse collection. The Greater London Council was abolished in 1986 and its functions passed to the London Boroughs, with some services provided through joint committees. Islington became a local education authority in 1990 when the Inner London Education Authority was dissolved.

Since 2000 the Greater London Authority has taken some responsibility for highways and planning control from the council, but within the English local government system the council remains a "most purpose" authority in terms of the available range of powers and functions.

== Powers and functions ==
The local authority derives its powers and functions from the London Government Act 1963 and subsequent legislation, and has the powers and functions of a London borough council. It sets council tax and as a billing authority it also collects precepts for Greater London Authority functions and business rates. It sets planning policies which complement Greater London Authority and national policies, and decides on almost all planning applications accordingly. It is also the local education authority.

== Political control ==
The council has been under Labour majority control since 2010. The first election was held in 1964, initially operating as a shadow authority alongside the outgoing authorities until it came into its powers on 1 April 1965. Political control of the council since 1965 has been as follows:

Party in control	Years
Labour	1965–1968
Conservative	1968–1971
Labour	1971–1981
SDP	1981–1982
Labour	1982–1998
No overall control	1998–1999
Liberal Democrats	1999–2006
No overall control	2006–2010
Labour	2010–present

=== Leadership ===
The role of Mayor of Islington is largely ceremonial. Political leadership is instead provided by the leader of the council. The leaders since 1965 have been:

Councillor	Party	From	To
David Gwyn Jones	Labour	1965	1968
Donald Bromfield	Conservative	1968	1969
Michael Morris	Conservative	1969	1971
David Gwyn Jones	Labour	1971	1972
Gerry Southgate	Labour	1972	May 1981
Donald Hoodless	Labour	May 1981	Dec 1981
Jim Evans	SDP	Dec 1981	May 1982
Margaret Hodge	Labour	May 1982	May 1992
Derek Sawyer	Labour	May 1992	May 1994
Alan Clinton	Labour	May 1994	May 1997
Derek Sawyer	Labour	May 1997	Dec 1999
Steve Hitchins	Liberal Democrats	Dec 1999	May 2006
James Kempton	Liberal Democrats	16 May 2006	May 2009
Terry Stacy	Liberal Democrats	14 May 2009	May 2010
Catherine West	Labour	18 May 2010	10 Oct 2013
Richard Watts	Labour	10 Oct 2013	20 May 2021
Kaya Comer-Schwartz	Labour	20 May 2021	Oct 2024
Una O'Halloran	Labour	19 Nov 2024	

=== Composition ===
Following the May 2026 election, the composition of the council is as follows:

Party	Councillors
Labour	32
Green	19
Total	51

The next election is due in May 2030.

== Wards ==
The wards of Islington and the number of seats:

1. Arsenal (3)
2. Barnsbury (3)
3. Bunhill (3)
4. Caledonian (3)
5. Canonbury (3)
6. Clerkenwell (3)
7. Finsbury Park (3)
8. Highbury (3)
9. Hillrise (3)
10. Holloway (3)
11. Junction (3)
12. Laycock (3)
13. Mildmay (3)
14. St Mary's & St James' (3)
15. St Peter's & Canalside (3)
16. Tollington (3)
17. Tufnell Park (3)

== Elections ==
Since the last boundary changes in 2022 the council has comprised 51 councillors that represent 17 wards, with each ward electing three councillors. Elections are held every four years.

== Premises ==
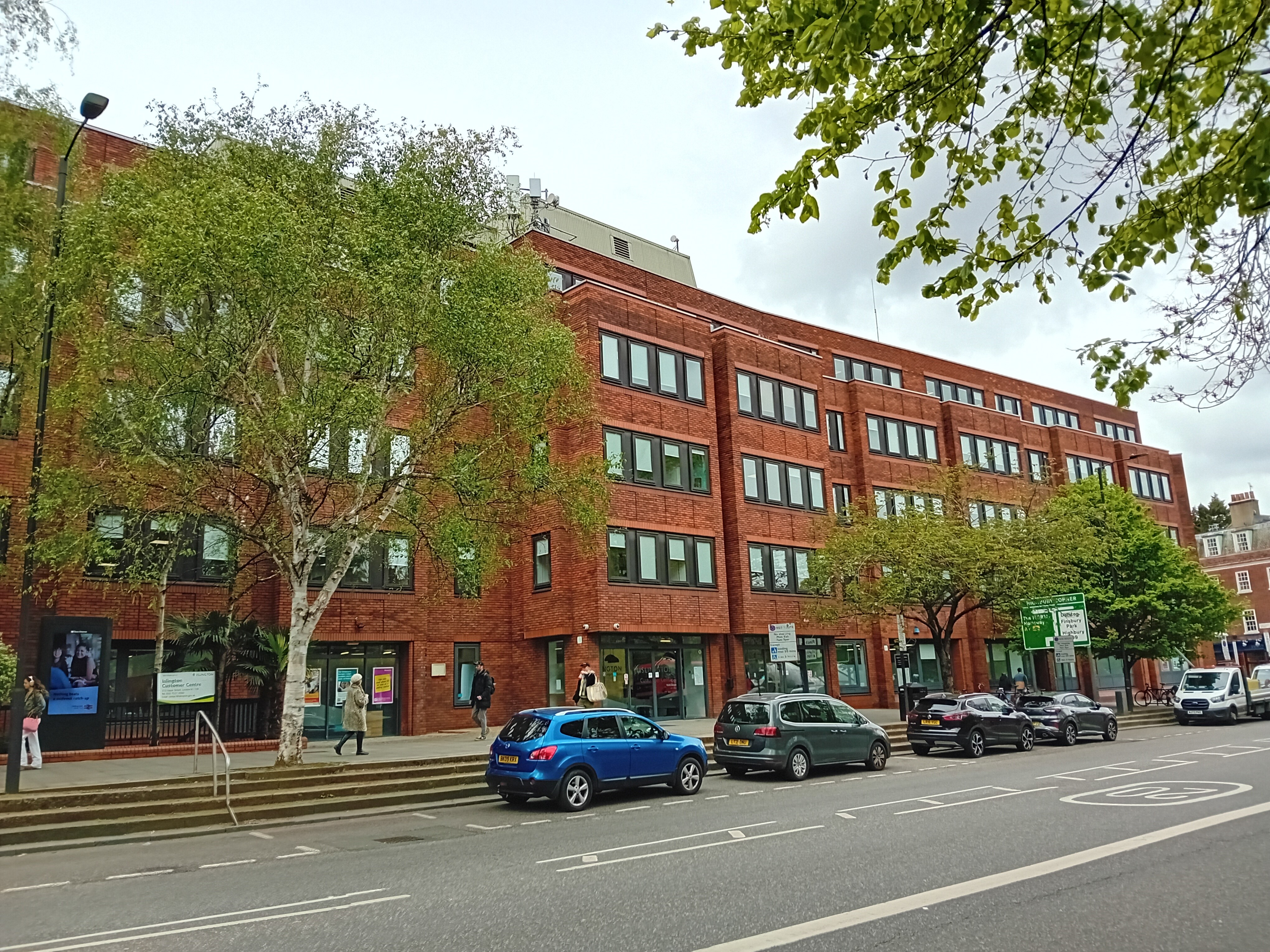
222 Upper Street, London, N1 1XR: Council offices, built 1983

The council meets and has some of its offices at Islington Town Hall on Upper Street, which was built in phases between 1922 and 1925 for the old Islington Borough Council. The council's other main offices are in a separate building nearby at 222 Upper Street, which was purpose-built for the council in 1983.

== See also ==
- London Capital Credit Union
