= Jo Richardson =

British Labour Party politician (1923–1994)

Chairman of the National Executive Committee
- In office 27 October 1989 – 1990
- Leader: Neil Kinnock
- Preceded by: Dennis Skinner
- Succeeded by: Tom Sawyer

Member of Parliament for Barking
- In office 28 February 1974 – 1 February 1994
- Preceded by: Tom Driberg
- Succeeded by: Margaret Hodge

Personal details
- Born: 28 August 1923 Newcastle-upon-Tyne, England
- Died: 1 February 1994 (aged 70) Barking, London, England
- Party: Labour

Josephine Richardson (28 August 1923 – 1 February 1994) was a British Labour Party politician. At the time of her death she was Member of Parliament for Barking, a post she had held almost exactly 20 years, since 1974.

== Early life ==
She was born in Newcastle upon Tyne, and attended Southend High School for Girls. Her father, a sales representative, had stood as a Liberal Party candidate in Darlington during the 1930s; he died while she was still young. Her mother was a member of the Congregational Church.

Despite her intellect, Richardson was unable to afford a university education, which she regretted throughout her life.

== Parliamentary career ==
Having joined the Labour Party in 1945, she began her political career as Ian Mikardo's secretary. Richardson co-ordinated the Keep Left Group within the party, and went on to become the secretary of the Tribune Group before co-ordinating the Victory for Socialism Campaign. In 1951 she was elected to Hornsey Borough Council and became Mikardo's full-time secretary and working partner in his business, which involved trade with eastern Europe. After unsuccessful campaigns as the Labour candidate in Monmouth in 1951 and 1955, Hornchurch in 1959, and Harrow East in 1964, Richardson was elected Member of Parliament for Barking in February 1974.

Richardson was seen as a peace campaigner on the hard left of the Labour Party. She was a member of the Socialist Campaign Group, but resigned in 1988 in protest at Tony Benn's decision to challenge Neil Kinnock for the leadership. Richardson also served as a member of the shadow cabinet. She was a central figure of the feminist left, helped to expand women's rights in Britain, and was the head of a group of women MPs that supported the anti-pornography position. She was also a pro-choice campaigner.

Richardson also served as an executive member of the National Council for Civil Liberties during a time in which the Paedophile Information Exchange (PIE), a pro-paedophile activist group, was affiliated with it. She wrote to PIE journal Childhood Rights, saying that she supported that organisation's campaign against corporal punishment.

She co-authored the pamphlet Keeping Left (1950) with Richard Crossman, Michael Foot and Ian Mikardo.

In 1985, KGB defector Oleg Gordievsky named Richardson and two other left-wing Labour MPs as confidential contacts of his embassy.

== Death and legacy ==
Amid complications of rheumatoid arthritis, Richardson's health declined precipitously in her last year of life, and she underwent spinal surgery. During this time, she was sometimes transported to the House of Commons by ambulance. She died from respiratory failure at her home on 1 February 1994, at the age of 70.

Jo Richardson Community School, in the London Borough of Barking and Dagenham, was named in her honour.

Parliament of the United Kingdom
Preceded by Tom Driberg	Member of Parliament for Barking; 1974–1994	Succeeded by Margaret Hodge
Party political offices
Preceded by Dennis Skinner	Chair of the Labour Party; 1989–1990	Succeeded by Tom Sawyer
