= The Battle for Barking =

- Directed by: Laura Fairrie
- Produced by: Laura Fairrie; Christopher Hird
- Starring: Margaret Hodge; Nick Griffin; Richard Barnbrook; Lawrence Rustem; Bob Bailey
- Cinematography: Laura Fairrie
- Edited by: John Mister
- Music by: Harry Escott; Molly Nyman
- Production company: Dartmouth Films
- Distributed by: More 4
- Release date: 4 November 2010
- Running time: 83 minutes
- Country: United Kingdom
- Language: English

The Battle for Barking is a 2010 British documentary film, chronologically filming the campaign for the election of MP to the Barking constituency. It won the Sheffield Youth Jury Award at Sheffield Doc/Fest in 2010.

== Reviews ==
Reviews were generally positive. The Telegraph took an anti-BNP stance writing that "the best thing about The Battle for Barking, was that it didn’t bash the BNP. Instead, it was quite happy to let the BNP bash themselves." The Guardian described the film as "altogether more substantial and red-blooded," attacking Griffin personally, writing that "the already overweight Griffin was seldom seen not scoffing a doughnut: he'd better start praying he finds a hospital without any black staff when he is eventually admitted for heart surgery." A review in the New Statesman praised the film as "revealing". A review in The Independent called the film "studiously even-handed" and remarked, "given 90 minutes of televisual rope, Griffin and co did a brilliant job of hanging themselves as credible political contenders."

The BNP's Deputy Chairman Simon Darby described on his blog how the documentary came about: "Well, was I right in trusting her (Fairrie), was the question I asked myself whilst brushing my teeth in the early hours of this morning. 'Yes.'"' However, the BNP's former National Organiser Eddy Butler wrote that "the overwhelming feeling after watching it is one of great sadness at the lost opportunity."
