= Margaret Hodge =

British politician and life peer (born 1944)

The Right Honourable The Baroness Hodge of Barking DBE PC
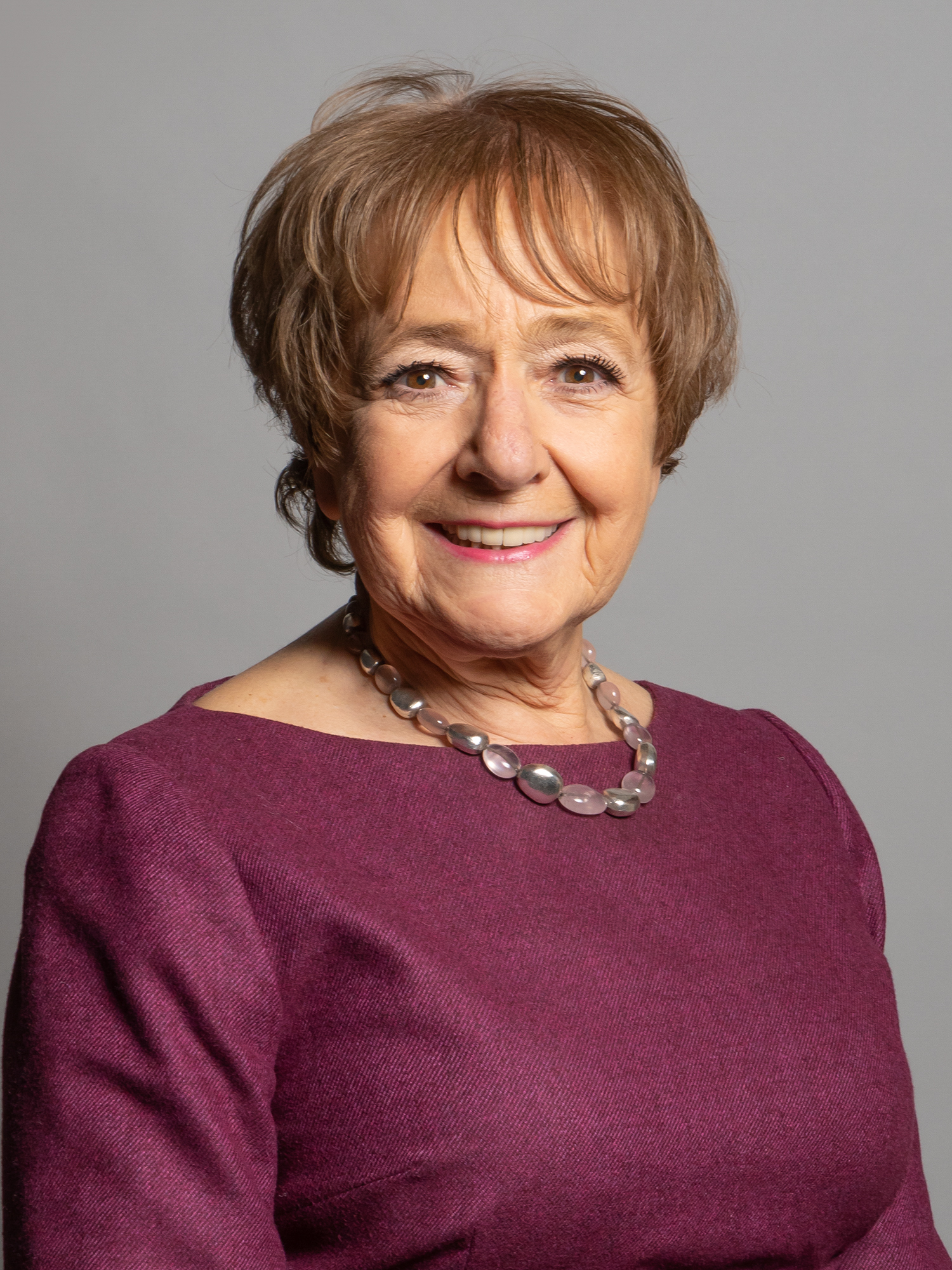
- Official portrait, 2020

Chair of the Public Accounts Committee
- In office 10 June 2010 – 30 March 2015
- Preceded by: Edward Leigh
- Succeeded by: Meg Hillier

Minister of State for Culture and Tourism
- In office 22 September 2009 – 11 May 2010
- Prime Minister: Gordon Brown
- Preceded by: Barbara Follett
- Succeeded by: John Penrose
- In office 27 June 2007 – 3 October 2008
- Prime Minister: Gordon Brown
- Preceded by: David Lammy
- Succeeded by: Barbara Follett

Minister of State for Industry and the Regions
- In office 5 May 2006 – 27 June 2007
- Prime Minister: Tony Blair
- Preceded by: Alun Michael
- Succeeded by: Office abolished

Minister of State for Work
- In office 9 May 2005 – 5 May 2006
- Prime Minister: Tony Blair
- Preceded by: Jane Kennedy
- Succeeded by: Jim Murphy

Minister of State for Universities
- In office 11 June 2001 – 13 June 2003
- Prime Minister: Tony Blair
- Preceded by: Tessa Jowell
- Succeeded by: Alan Johnson
Junior ministerial offices
Minister of State for Children
In office 13 June 2003 – 9 May 2005
| Prime Minister | Tony Blair |
| Preceded by | Office established |
| Succeeded by | Maria Eagle |
Parliamentary Under-Secretary of State for Disabled People
In office 29 July 1998 – 11 June 2001
| Prime Minister | Tony Blair |
| Preceded by | Paul Boateng |
| Succeeded by | Maria Eagle |

Member of the House of Lords
- Lord Temporal
- Life peerage 14 August 2024

Member of Parliament for Barking
- In office 9 June 1994 – 30 May 2024
- Preceded by: Jo Richardson
- Succeeded by: Nesil Caliskan

Personal details
- Born: Margaret Eve Oppenheimer; 8 September 1944 (age 82) Alexandria, Egypt
- Party: Labour
- Spouses: Andrew Watson (m. 1968; div. 1978) Henry Hodge (m. 1978; died 2009)
- Children: 4
- Education: London School of Economics (BA); Bedford College, London
- Website: Official website

Margaret Eve Hodge, Baroness Hodge of Barking DBE PC (née Oppenheimer, formerly Watson; born 8 September 1944), is a British politician and life peer, who served as Member of Parliament (MP) for Barking from 1994 to 2024. A member of the Labour Party, she was previously Leader of Islington London Borough Council from 1982 to 1992. She has held a number of ministerial roles and served as chair of the Public Accounts Committee from 2010 to 2015.

Hodge was born to German Jewish parents who fled the Nazis during the Holocaust, and her father was the co-founder of steel firm Stemcor. She was a councillor on Islington Council from 1973 to 1994, was chair of the Housing Committee, and then Council Leader from 1982 to 1992. Hodge later apologised for failing to ensure that allegations of serious child abuse in council-run homes were sufficiently investigated and for libelling a complainant.

Hodge was elected to parliament in a 1994 by-election. She was appointed Junior Minister for Disabled People in 1998 and promoted to Minister for Universities in 2001, subsequently becoming the first Children's Minister in 2003, joining the Privy Council. In 2005, Hodge became Minister of State for Work. Hodge served as Minister of State for Culture and Tourism from 2007 to 2008 and 2009 until Labour was defeated at the 2010 general election. Since then she has been known as a strong supporter of Israel and has made controversial accusations of antisemitism against other Labour party members. She remained as a backbench MP for Barking until 2024. She was awarded a life peerage in 2024 Dissolution Honours taking her seat in the House of Lords in September 2024.

== Early life ==
Hodge was born on 8 September 1944 in Alexandria, Egypt, to Jewish refugee parents Hans Oppenheimer, and his wife Lisbeth (née Hollitscher). Hans Oppenheimer left Stuttgart in Germany during the 1930s to join his uncle's metals business based in Cairo and Alexandria, where he met fellow émigrée, Austrian-born Lisbeth Hollitscher. Married in 1936, Hans and Lisbeth had five children.

At the outset of World War II, the couple and their eldest daughter were rendered stateless, effectively stranded in the Kingdom of Egypt for the duration of the War. They decided to leave Egypt in 1948, concerned that antisemitism had increased in the Middle East during the 1948 Arab–Israeli War. The family moved to Orpington, Kent (present-day Greater London), where they started their family-owned steel-trading corporation, Stemcor. It is now one of the world's largest privately held steel companies, with an annual turnover of over £6 billion in 2011. Hodge is a major shareholder, listing her holdings in the Parliamentary Register of Members' Interests. Stemcor was run by her brother, Ralph, until September 2013.

When Hodge was 10 years old, in 1954, her mother died of stomach cancer. Hodge attended Bromley High School, followed by Oxford High School as a boarder. She went on to study at the London School of Economics, graduating in 1966 with a third-class honours degree in government studies. After working briefly on television political programmes, she began, but did not complete, a master's degree in philosophy at Bedford College, London.

Hodge supported the CND Aldermaston Marches and protests over the Vietnam war.

== Early career ==
From 1966 to 1971, Hodge worked in market research at Unilever, and in PR at Weber Shandwick. From 1992 to 1994, she was a senior consultant at Price Waterhouse.

== Islington Council ==
Hodge was first elected as a Councillor for the London Borough of Islington at a by-election in 1973, representing the Barnsbury ward. She became chair of the Housing Committee in 1975. This was an important post in a local authority which had one of the worst set of housing statistics in London during a period when London boroughs were required to be housing providers and managers. Hodge's tenure as Housing Chairman oversaw the continuation of a large new housing programme. There was a change of emphasis to the refurbishment of sound older buildings (e.g. Charteris Road, Alexander Road areas), in response to a paper published by the Islington Housing Action Group.

The Islington Labour Party was badly affected by the defection of members and elected representatives to the Social Democratic Party. In the 1978 council election she was elected to Thornhill ward, before representing Barnsbury again at the 1982 election, and moving to Sussex ward at the 1986 election.

After Labour won all but one of the council seats in the 1982 council election on a strong left-wing manifesto, Hodge became Council Leader, a post she held until 1992. In 1984 Hodge was a public leader of Islington participating in the rate-capping rebellion to the Conservative government's imposition of spending restrictions on councils, setting no council rate. As with other councils, the district auditor ordered Islington to set a legal rate, which it complied with hours before the deadline. Hodge and the council were often portrayed as part of the "loony left" by some newspapers. In 1994 Hodge was disqualified as a councillor after not attending council meetings for over six months; Hodge stated she had not been active out of respect for the new council leadership.

=== Child abuse controversy ===
The end of Hodge's service on Islington Council, prior to her entering Parliament, was marred by the emergence of serious child abuse allegations concerning Council-run children's homes in Islington. She has apologised several times since the emergence of the scandal in the 1980s that directly linked her council tenure with what she admitted in 2014 was "shameful naivety" in ignoring the complaints of paedophile victims.

In 1985, Demetrios Panton wrote to Islington Council to complain about abuse suffered while in Council care during the 1970s and 1980s. Panton received an official response in 1989, in which the Council denied all responsibility. In 1990, Liz Davies, a senior social worker employed by the borough, with her manager, David Cofie, raised concerns about sexual abuse of children under the care of Islington Council. Correspondence between Hodge and the then Director of Social Work indicates that Hodge declined a request for extra investigative resources. Instead, the Cofie–Davies investigation was dismissed by council officials in May 1990 after the police declared they had found insufficient evidence of abuse; despite this, the two social workers continued their enquiries.

In 1992, the Evening Standard resumed reporting allegations of abuse in the Islington Care Homes. Its initial report was slated by Hodge as a "sensationalist piece of gutter journalism", although she has since apologised, claiming that her officials had given her false information. In 1995, the "White Report" into sexual abuse in Islington Care Homes confirmed that the council had failed to adequately investigate the allegations, claiming that its doctrinaire interpretation of equal opportunities created a climate of fear at being labelled homophobic.

In 2003, following Hodge's appointment as Minister for Children, Panton went public with his allegations that he had been the subject of abuse in Islington Council care and that, although he had repeatedly raised the matter, he had been ignored. He identified Hodge's complacency as ultimately responsible for the abuse that he alleged he had suffered. Liz Davies simultaneously went public regarding the concerns she had previously raised while working for the council. Following a media campaign by several national newspapers calling for Hodge to resign from her new post, she wrote to Panton, apologising for referring to him as "an extremely disturbed person" in an earlier letter to the Chairman of the BBC Gavyn Davies, which had been broadcast on Radio 4's Today programme. This was subsequently brought to the floor of the House of Commons in Prime Minister's Questions by opposition leader Michael Howard. A formal apology to Panton was made in the High Court on 19 November 2003 by Lady Hodge's barrister together with a financial settlement of £30,000.

In April 2014, Education Secretary Michael Gove instigated investigations into 21 children's homes nationally, where new evidence suggested Jimmy Savile might have abused young people, including one in Islington during the period Hodge was leader. This prompted Hodge to issue a further apology stating "our naivety was shameful". The investigation failed to reach any firm conclusions.

== Parliamentary career ==
Hodge served as the Labour MP for Barking after winning the by-election on 9 June 1994 following the death of Jo Richardson. Whilst still a new MP, she endorsed the candidature of Tony Blair, a former Islington neighbour, for the Labour Party leadership, following the sudden death of John Smith from a heart attack. In 2017, she had a majority of 21,608. On 2 December 2021 she announced she would not be standing at the next general election, and she ceased to be an MP in June 2024.

=== Ministerial roles ===
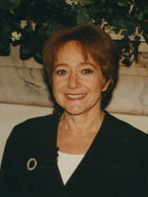
Margaret Hodge in 1998

Hodge was appointed Junior Minister for Disabled People in 1998 and was promoted Minister for Universities at the new Department for Education and Skills in 2001, in which capacity she piloted the controversial Higher Education Act 2004, remaining in post until 2003, when she became the inaugural Children's Minister. She was sworn into the Privy Council on 22 June 2003.

In 2003, Hodge was appointed to the newly created high-profile role of Children's minister, which included responsibility for Special Education, Early Years Education and Childcare, the Young People's Unit, teenage pregnancy, the Family Policy Unit, and general responsibility for child welfare.

In 2005, Hodge was moved to become Minister of State for Work. On 17 June 2005, she was criticised for saying that former employees of MG Rover would be able to obtain jobs at Tesco, a local supermarket. Later, she claimed that this was not what she meant, rather that she had empathy for those losing their jobs, and was pointing to a new Tesco supermarket as an example of new jobs being created in the area in face of the redundancies at the car manufacturing plant.

On 27 June 2007, Hodge was reappointed Minister of State in the Department for Culture by new Prime Minister Gordon Brown. As Minister of State for Culture, Creative Industries and Tourism, she was quick to criticise Britain's foremost classical music festival, The Proms, for not being sufficiently inclusive, instead praising popular television shows such as Coronation Street. Following the Cabinet reshuffle of 3 October 2008, it was announced that Hodge was "temporarily leaving Government on compassionate grounds of family illness and will return to Government in the Spring". While she was absent from the Government, she was temporarily replaced as Minister of State by Barbara Follett. Hodge was reappointed Minister of State responsible for Culture and Tourism on 22 September 2009. In January 2010, Hodge announced that Royal Parks, which manages Richmond Park and Bushy Park in the London Borough of Richmond upon Thames among others, was to be allowed to charge car drivers £2 per visit. This announcement sparked protests in South London and was opposed by local politicians including Conservative Zac Goldsmith, Liberal Democrats Vince Cable and Susan Kramer.

=== Barking and the BNP ===
Hodge once called for British-born families to have priority on council house waiting lists over immigrants. This comment received praise from the far-right political party the BNP and led to calls for Hodge to resign. However, her comments would be defended by her colleagues.

In April 2006, Hodge commented in an interview with The Sunday Telegraph that eight out of ten white working class voters in her constituency might be tempted to vote for the British National Party (BNP) at the May 2006 local elections because "no one else is listening to them" about their concerns over unemployment, high house prices and the housing of asylum seekers in the area. She said the Labour Party must promote "very, very strongly the benefits of the new, rich multi-racial society which is part of this part of London for me". There was widespread media coverage of her remarks, and Hodge was strongly criticised for giving the BNP publicity. The BNP went on to gain eleven council seats at the 2006 election out of a total of 51, making them the second-largest party. It was reported that Labour activists accused Hodge of generating hundreds of extra votes for the BNP, and that local members began to privately discuss the possibility of a move to deselect her. The GMB wrote to Hodge in May 2006, demanding her resignation.

Writing in The Observer on 20 May 2007 Hodge argued that established families should take priority in the allocation of social housing over new economic migrants, stating that "We should look at policies where the legitimate sense of entitlement felt by the indigenous family overrides the legitimate need demonstrated by the new migrants." Her comments were condemned by the Refugee Council and other representative bodies.

In November 2009, the Leader of the BNP, Nick Griffin, announced that he intended to contest the Barking seat at the 2010 general election. In spite of the union's position, Hodge was the Labour candidate and was returned as the Member of Parliament, doubling her majority, whilst Griffin finished in third place behind the Conservatives. The BNP lost all their council seats in the 2010 election.

=== Public Accounts Committee ===
On 10 June 2010 Hodge was elected by MPs to the Chair of the Public Accounts Committee in the fifth round of voting using the single transferable vote system. According to Peter Riddell, under Hodge's leadership, the PAC has held civil servants to account using procedure contrary to established practice. Gus O'Donnell, then head of the civil service, accused her of presiding over a "theatrical exercise in public humiliation", while Alan Duncan accused her of being "abusive and bullying" towards Rona Fairhead.

The Oppenheimers' family company, Stemcor, which had been founded by Hodge's father, Hans Oppenheimer, was run by her brother, Ralph, until September 2013. In November 2012, Helia Ebrahimi, The Daily Telegraph's City Correspondent, raised the issue of Hodge's suitability as chair of the Public Accounts Committee, reporting that her family's company "pays just 0.01pc tax on £2.1bn of business generated in the UK". This led to an investigation into the tax arrangements of a number of American companies operating in the United Kingdom. In April 2015, The Times reported that Hodge had benefited from the closure in 2011 of a Liechtenstein foundation which held shares in Stemcor, using the Liechtenstein Disclosure Facility, a legal means of returning undisclosed assets to the UK with reduced penalties. Hodge gained 96,000 shares worth £1,500,000 as a result. Hodge said she had played no part in administering or establishing the scheme. She explained: "All I could do as a shareholder in a company not run by me, and over which I had no influence or control, was to ensure that any shares I held were above board and that I paid all relevant taxes in full. Every time I received any benefit from the company this happened."

Shortly after Labour's defeat at the 2015 general election, it emerged that Hodge would not be standing for re-election to the Public Accounts Committee. She was succeeded as chair in June 2015 by Meg Hillier. Hodge has since written a book about her time as chair of the Public Accounts Committee entitled Called to Account.

=== Garden Bridge Project review ===
In September 2016, London Mayor Sadiq Khan asked Hodge to review the Garden Bridge project. Hodge was tasked with determining whether value for money was achieved from the taxpayers' £60 million contribution to the bridge, as well as investigating whether transparency standards were met by public bodies. Hodge's review was published in April 2017. Hodge recommended that 'It would be better for the taxpayer to accept the financial loss of cancelling the project than to risk the potential uncertain additional costs to the public purse if the project proceeds.' The report found that decisions on the Garden Bridge were driven more by electoral cycles than value for taxpayers' money, and that there was not an open, fair and competitive process around two procurements. In response, the BBC's transport correspondent, Tom Edwards, reported that 'I can't remember reading a report so damning of a transport project.'

In June 2017, Andrew Boff, a Conservative member of the London Assembly, criticised Margaret Hodge's report on the Garden Bridge, and claimed that she broke Parliamentary rules during her research. In December 2017, the Parliamentary Standards Committee found that Hodge had breached the MPs' code of conduct. The code states MPs should use public resources only "in support of parliamentary duties". The committee ruled that, because the review had been commissioned by an outside body, it had not been carried out as part of Hodge's parliamentary activities. The committee recommended that Hodge apologise to the House of Commons for the breach on a point of order. Hodge subsequently apologised and said "I carried out this inquiry in good faith and in the public interest. "I think all MPs would benefit from greater clarity in the rules governing the use of offices." Hodge later repaid £2.97, which represented the cost of House of Commons stationery, after the committee's report found that she should not have used Parliamentary resources for her review. In response to the findings of the Parliamentary Standards Committee's investigation, Andrew Boff said the committee's findings left "a sour taste", and claimed that he found it 'hard to believe [Hodge] was unaware of the rules."

=== Views ===
At a keynote speech to the Institute for Public Policy Research on 26 November 2004, Hodge defended the concept of greater state regulation of individuals' choices, asserting only that "some may call it the nanny state but I call it a force for good".

On 17 November 2006, it was reported by the Islington Tribune that Hodge described the Iraq War as a "big mistake in foreign affairs". This report, relayed by BBC News, appeared to cast doubt on Hodge's confidence in Tony Blair's foreign policy since 1998. A Downing Street spokesperson responded by pointing out that "Margaret Hodge voted for military action in Iraq. Since then, she has always spoken in favour of it."

In the 2015 Labour leadership election, she nominated Liz Kendall.

In June 2016, together with Ann Coffey, Hodge called for a motion of no confidence in party leader Jeremy Corbyn. The following month, she supported Owen Smith in the 2016 Labour leadership election. Hodge identifies as a Zionist.

==== Views on antisemitism in Labour ====
In July 2018, the National Executive Committee (NEC) adopted a code of conduct on antisemitism which was based on the IHRA's working definition while omitting or modifying examples of antisemitism, including defining how criticism of Israel can be antisemitic. Hodge subsequently said that Labour's refusal to adopt the full set of unamended examples for disciplinary purposes "make the party a hostile environment for Jews. It chose to entrench antisemitism ... This means that in 2018 a party member can call a Jew a Nazi and face little consequence." In contrast, a coalition of 36 international Jewish anti-Zionist groups signed a letter of opposition to the IHRA definition, calling it a "distorted definition of antisemitism to stifle criticism of Israel". Labour said all the examples were covered by other parts of the code. After the adoption of the new code, Hodge confronted Labour leader Jeremy Corbyn in parliament and called him "a fucking antisemite and a racist". The Party initiated a disciplinary investigation of the incident, with a spokesperson saying that "The rules of the Parliamentary Labour Party are quite clear, that colleagues have to treat each other with respect and not bring the party into disrepute and that is why action will be taken." The investigation was terminated following fears that MPs would resign had it continued. A Labour spokesperson said that Hodge "expressed regret" for her remarks: however, Hodge said that there were "no apologies, on either side". Hodge said that the prospect of an investigation had made her think about "what it felt like to be a Jew in Germany in the 30s".

Also in July 2018, she accepted an invitation to become an honorary patron of the Campaign Against Antisemitism (CAA). In the run-up to the 2019 general election, CAA asked her to resign because she was standing as a Labour Party candidate; she did so but described their decision as "both astonishing and wounding", showing a lack of respect and impugning her integrity.

In March 2019, Hodge made a secret recording of a meeting she had with Corbyn. The recording was later passed to The Sunday Times which published extracts. In the recording, Corbyn said that some evidence of complaints was being mislaid, ignored or not used, which was why he had asked Lord Falconer to review the process. Corbyn later wrote to Hodge to convey his disappointment at what he considered "to be a total breach of trust and privacy". In the same month, she proposed that the party close down constituencies that passed motions critical of individual investigations or of the IHRA's Working Definition.

In June 2019, Hodge condemned the reinstatement to Labour of Chris Williamson, who had been investigated for comments he had made on antisemitism in the Labour Party.

In July 2019, Hodge called for a new and entirely independent system to handle antisemitism disciplinary proceedings in the Labour party as, she said, political interference has corrupted the current system. The party rejected her claim as unfounded. She also stated that matters had only become worse since she confronted Corbyn a year before.

In July 2019, Charedi activist Shraga Stern filed a complaint with the Labour Party against Margaret Hodge after she tweeted about a meeting he had with Jeremy Corbyn which said "Having lunch & wondering why Corbyn wants to be seen talking to an anti-LGBT activist who doesn't represent the mainstream Jewish community yet chooses to sideline groups like Jewish Labour". No further public information was made available about the complaint process.

In September 2019, Hodge said "I'm not going to give up until Jeremy Corbyn ceases to be leader of the Labour Party."

Hodge is a supporter of Labour Friends of Israel.

=== Other events ===
In 2004, Fathers 4 Justice campaigner Jonathan Stanesby handcuffed Hodge, stating he was arresting her for child abuse. Fathers 4 Justice targeted Hodge perceiving her as the "bogeywoman of family law, who doesn't even believe in equal parenting". Stanesby and collaborator Jason Hatch were acquitted of the charge of false imprisonment which they successfully defended as a reasonable form of political protest.

In June 2019, the TSSA conference passed a motion criticising Hodge for "endorsing tactical voting, including voting for candidates other than Labour" in the 2019 European Parliament election, pointing out that this was a breach of party rules and should result in automatic removal of membership.

On 28 September 2019, Barking Labour members voted in a 'trigger ballot' to hold a full selection process to choose their parliamentary candidate for the next general election, rather than automatically reselecting Hodge. She said she wished to stand and was automatically included in an all woman shortlist. According to one local member, factors in the decision to hold a selection process included her age, the desire to have an MP who lives in the area and support for the principles of accountability and local democracy. On Monday 28 October 2019, Hodge was reselected.

== House of Lords ==
Hodge announced in 2021 that she would not seek re-election as MP for Barking and shortly after the 2024 general election, she was nominated for a life peerage in the 2024 Dissolution Honours. She was created Baroness Hodge of Barking, of Great Massingham in the County of Norfolk, on 14 August 2024. She was introduced to the House of Lords on 4 September 2024.

== Non-political roles ==
She is a vice president of the Fabian Society.

Since November 2018, Hodge has been Chair of Council at Royal Holloway, University of London, following the Privy Council consenting to the position being remunerated. Hitherto, this role had always been a voluntary position.

== Personal life ==
Hodge married Andrew Watson in 1968; the couple had one son and a daughter, Lizzi Watson, a BBC journalist. They divorced in 1978 and in the same year she married Henry Hodge (later Sir Henry), by whom she had two more daughters. He was a solicitor who was appointed as a High Court Judge in 2004. He died in 2009.

Hodge describes herself as a secular Jew, but that her religious background is "what defines me".

== Use of offshore tax haven ==
In 2015 there was considerable controversy about her benefiting, to the tune of £1.5 million, from assets repatriated from a Liechtenstein family trust in 2011 using the Liechtenstein disclosure facility, that reduced penalties and removed the risk of prosecution for Britons moving undeclared assets back to the UK. Coverage focused on the apparent hypocrisy in her condemnation of the use of tax havens. The Times reported that 75% of the shares in the family trust had previously been held in Panama, which Hodge had previously criticised for its financial secrecy and use as a tax haven. Hodge issued a statement that she had always fully declared the shareholding, never had a management role in the company, and had received assurances that the company always paid the appropriate tax.

== Honours ==
Hodge was appointed Member of the Order of the British Empire (MBE) in the 1978 Birthday Honours while a member of Islington Council. She was promoted to Dame Commander of the Order of the British Empire (DBE) in the 2015 Dissolution Honours for political service.

Hodge was made a freeman of the City of London in 2013.

Parliament of the United Kingdom
| Preceded by Jo Richardson | Member of Parliament for Barking; 1994–2024 | Succeeded by Nesil Caliskan |
Political offices
| Preceded by Paul Boateng | Parliamentary under-secretary of state for Disabled People; 1998–2001 | Succeeded by Maria Eagle |
| Preceded by Office created | Minister of State for Children; 2001–2005 | Succeeded by Maria Eagle |
| Preceded by Jane Kennedy | Minister of State for Work; 2005–2007 | Succeeded by Jim Murphy |
| Preceded by Barbara Follett | Minister of State for Culture and Tourism; 2009–2010 | Succeeded by Ed Vaizey |
| Preceded by Edward Leigh | Chair of the Public Accounts Committee; 2010–2015 | Succeeded by Meg Hillier |
Party political offices
| Preceded by Chris Smith | Chair of the Fabian Society; 1998–1999 | Succeeded by Tony Wright |
