= Nesil Caliskan =

British Labour politician

Nesil Caliskan MP
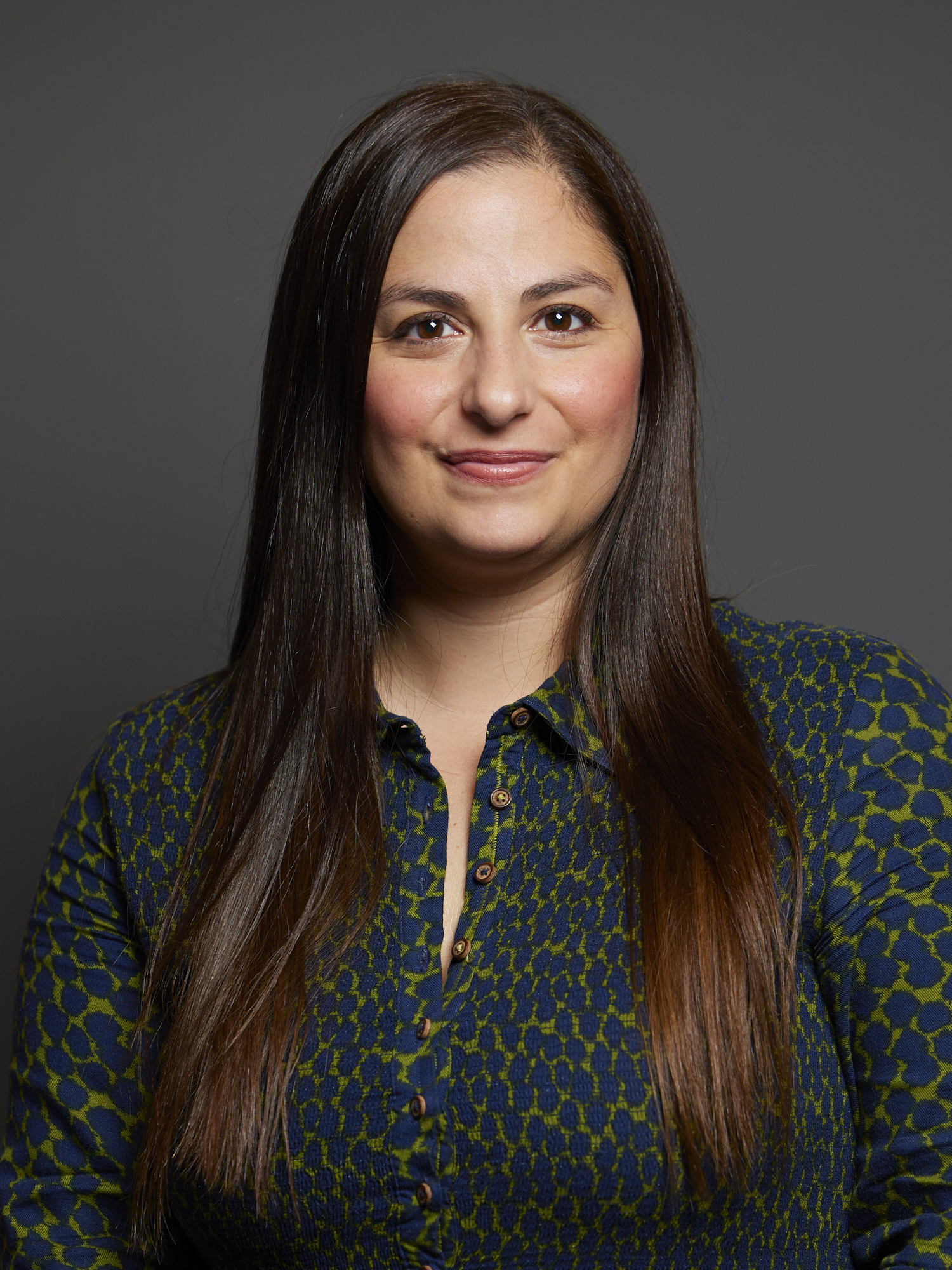
- Official portrait, 2024

Parliamentary Under-Secretary of State for Devolution, Local Growth and Communities
- In office 12 May 2026 – 22 July 2026
- Prime Minister: Keir Starmer
- Preceded by: Miatta Fahnbulleh
- Succeeded by: Jim McMahon (Devolution and Regional Growth); Florence Eshalomi (Communities)

Comptroller of the Household
- In office 7 September 2025 – 12 May 2026
- Prime Minister: Keir Starmer
- Preceded by: Chris Elmore
- Succeeded by: Gen Kitchen

Member of Parliament for Barking
- Incumbent
- Assumed office 4 July 2024
- Preceded by: Margaret Hodge
- Majority: 11,054 (30.3%)

Leader of Enfield Council
- In office 23 May 2018 – 9 August 2024
- Deputy: Ergin Erbil
- Preceded by: Doug Taylor
- Succeeded by: Ergin Erbil

Member of Enfield Council for Jubilee ward
- In office 7 May 2015 – October 2024
- Preceded by: Rohini Simbodyal
- Succeeded by: Ian Barnes

Personal details
- Born: Nesil Cazimoglu; 27 October 1988 (age 37) Enfield, London, England
- Party: Labour
- Spouse: Emre Caliskan
- Children: 1
- Parent: Alev Cazimoglu (mother)
- Education: University of Reading (BA); London School of Economics (MSc)
- Website: https://www.nesilcaliskan.com/

Nesil Caliskan (née Cazimoglu; born 1988) is a Labour politician who has been the Member of Parliament (MP) for Barking since 2024. She also served as Parliamentary Under-Secretary of State for Devolution, Local Growth and Communities in 2026.

== Early life ==
Caliskan was born in a family of Turkish Cypriot descent and raised in Enfield, London. She was privately educated and attended Palmers Green High School. In 2010, she graduated with a bachelor's degree in Politics and International Relations from the University of Reading, and graduated with a Master of Science degree in Politics and Communication from the London School of Economics in 2012. During her time at Reading University, Caliskan was vice president responsible for Democracy and Campaigns between 2010 and 2011, during which she participated in the 2010 United Kingdom student protests against increased tuition fees and spending cuts by the Conservative-Liberal Democrat coalition.

== Career outside Parliament ==
Caliskan joined the Labour Party aged 15 years old and has campaigned for Labour in every election since 2004. From 2013 to 2015, Caliskan was Cabinet Support Officer in Haringey Council and from June to December 2015 a Parliamentary Researcher in the House of Commons and also had roles in the NHS from 2016 to 2018. In a by-election in May 2015, Caliskan was elected as a member of Enfield Council for the Jubilee ward. In May 2018, aged 29, Caliskan was elected Leader of Enfield Council after unexpectedly defeating incumbent Doug Taylor, who had led the council for eight years, becoming the first female and Turkish-Cypriot council leader in Enfield and the youngest female council leader in the country at the time. Caliskan is currently a board member of ReLondon and Lee Valley Regional Park Authority, Chair of the Safer and Stronger Communities Board, and an Executive Member of London Councils. In May 2023, she was elected as Labour's chief of the Local Government Association (LGA) and has sat on Labour's governing National Executive Committee (NEC) since September 2023. From January to February 2024, deputy leader Ergin Erbil was temporarily made council leader after Caliskan took maternity leave.

== Parliamentary career ==
In June 2024, Caliskan was formally selected as the candidate for Barking for the 2024 general election to succeed veteran MP Margaret Hodge after the original candidate, Leader of Barking and Dagenham Council Darren Rodwell, withdrew his candidacy due to sexual harassment allegations against him, which Rodwell was nevertheless cleared of days afterwards. Caliskan is the first Turkish-Cypriot heritage Member of Parliament. On 4 July, Caliskan was elected Member of Parliament for Barking with an 11,054 majority, succeeding veteran MP Margaret Hodge who stood down. Shortly after being elected MP, Caliskan announced that she would stand down as Enfield Council leader as soon as a new leader is elected. On 9 August 2024, Caliskan resigned as leader of Enfield Council with Ergin Erbil made interim leader, but remained a councillor of Enfield Council. On 18 September, Ergin Erbil was formally elected leader of Enfield Council. Caliskan has after her election as MP effectively resigned as a National Executive Committee (NEC) member. On 28 November 2024, following her resignation as a councillor for Jubilee ward, Ian Barnes was elected to replace Caliskan.

=== Government experience ===
On 7 September 2025, Caliskan was given a new job as Comptroller of the Household, which means she was the third most senior UK Government Whip in the House of Commons; she is also the first Turkish-Cypriot heritage MP to be appointed a Government Whip.

On 12 May 2026, following multiple government resignations, Caliskan was appointed Parliamentary Under-Secretary of State in the Ministry of Housing, Communities and Local Government. She left government in July 2026.

== Personal life ==
Caliskan is married to Turkish international relations academic and author Emre Caliskan. In 2024, she gave birth to her first child. Her mother, Alev Cazimoglu, is also a member of Enfield Council.

== See also ==
- British Turks
- British Cypriots
- Turkish Cypriots
- List of Turkish Cypriots
- List of British people of Cypriot descent
- List of British Turks

Parliament of the United Kingdom
Preceded by Margaret Hodge	Member of Parliament for Barking; 2024–present	Incumbent
