= Fritz Kaiser =

Liechtenstein businessman (born 1955)

- Born: 22 March 1955 (age 71); Mauren, Liechtenstein
- Occupations: Entrepreneur, investor
- Employer: Kaiser Partner

Fritz Kaiser (born 22 March 1955) is a wealth management entrepreneur, investor and philanthropist from the Principality of Liechtenstein. He is married to Birgit and has four children. He is co-founder and executive chairman of Kaiser Partner, a wealth management firm that provides family office and wealth management services to private wealth owners and their advisors. Kaiser is an advocate for responsible wealth management and is well known for his innovation in this field. Specifically, in 2011, he won the Spear's Magazine "Wealth Management Innovator of the Year" award for the successful instigation and development of the Liechtenstein disclosure facility (LDF), a vehicle which promotes tax compliance by assisting British taxpayers in the declaration of previously untaxed assets. He also co-founded the Mentor Foundation, a leading international NGO voice of drug abuse prevention.

== Personal life ==
Fritz Kaiser is married and has four children. In 1976 he represented Liechtenstein in Judo at the Montreal Olympics and he has retained an interest in sport throughout his life. He is co-founder and trustee of the Mentor Foundation, a drug-prevention organization for children launched 1994 at the United Nations General Assembly in Geneva. The Foundation's current patron is Queen Silvia of Sweden. Fritz Kaiser is a member of the World Economic Forum (WEF). He is also an avid collector of Chinese Contemporary Art and has established the virtual museum "88 Mocca – The Museum of Chinese Contemporary Art on the web".

== Career ==
Fritz Kaiser completed a commerce degree (Handelsakademie) in Feldkirch, Austria and began his business career in 1977 at Präsidial-Anstalt, one of the leading trust firms in Liechtenstein. In 1982 he established his own business, the Fritz Kaiser Group (FKG), providing wealth management services to private wealth owners, entrepreneurs and internationally famous personalities from the worlds of sport and art. Kaiser continued to pursue this interest in financial services through his purchase of the Diners Club credit card business in Liechtenstein and Switzerland. He served as a member of the Diners Club International Strategic Council at its licensor Citibank, who he sold the company to in 1999. In 1995, Fritz Kaiser became co-owner of the Swiss Formula One racing team Sauber, of which he was chairman from 1997-1999. During his F1 partnership time he successfully secured a contract with Red Bull in 1995, negotiated the Malaysian petroleum company Petronas as the main sponsor and engineering joint venture partner and developed the engine partnership with Ferrari. In 1999 he sold his share in the team to his partners, Peter Sauber and Dietrich Mateschitz (from Red Bull)." In more recent years, Kaiser has worked to promote the cause of responsible wealth management with Kaiser Partner.

=== Role in Kaiser Partner ===
Kaiser Partner, the international wealth management firm of which Fritz Kaiser is currently Executive Chairman, is founded on the principle of responsibility in wealth management. Kaiser Partner comprises several companies which provide integrated wealth management solutions including private banking, fund administration, financial advisory, family office, trust and asset management services. At the heart of the services offered by Kaiser Partner is Fritz Kaiser's belief that it is the duty of wealth management firms to help families and their advisors responsibly grow and preserve private wealth. To support this mantra, Kaiser Partner runs a Responsible Investing blog which discusses global developments relating to sustainable and ethical investing.

=== Private Wealth Council ===
Kaiser Partner is also affiliated with the Private Wealth Council which was founded by Fritz Kaiser during the Annual Meeting of the World Economic Forum 2004 in Davos. It is an independent, international forum bringing together private wealth owners, experts and thought leaders from across the world to address issues pertaining to the responsible use of private wealth. Since 2008, the Private Wealth Council has published the findings of its work in its international publication Responsible Wealth Review. In the first issue, Al Gore, the former US Vice-President who now champions environmental issues, laid out nine drivers of global change which influence responsible wealth ownership. In an e-Financial News article from 2009, Kaiser commented that 'If you understand the drivers of change and navigate on the right side of change then you have a better chance of being a successful long-term investor rather than just another gambler in the market'.

== Role in the Liechtenstein Disclosure Facility ==
Well known for his commitment to compliance and responsibility, in 2008 Fritz Kaiser was invited to join the Liechtenstein Governments' Advisory board for the initiative "Futuro" to help set the direction for the future of the Liechtenstein financial centre. He headed the Liechtenstein task force to develop a solution for the financial centre in collaboration with The Organisation for Economic Co-operation and Development (OECD), the outcome of which was a unique pledge of transparency to the OECD, called the Liechtenstein Declaration. With many clients in the global offshore markets struggling to find fair solutions for untaxed funds, Kaiser instigated a solution with the British government known as the Liechtenstein Disclosure Facility (LDF). This agreement would assist British citizens with non-declared assets in their disclosure, making them HMRC compliant for a minimum penalty. This was clearly an attractive offering for those with offshore accounts, but its success could not have been predicted. British taxpayers recognized that this was a non-discriminatory solution which could facilitate long-term wealth preservation and compliance. It was for this work that Fritz Kaiser and his colleague, former Baker & McKenzie lawyer Philip Marcovici, won the Spear's Magazine Award for 'Wealth Management Innovator of the Year 2011'.

== In the media ==
Bilanz-Artikel: "Der Netzwerker" (www.kaiserritterpartner.com/uploads/media/Bilanz19_2007.pdf)
