= Stemcor =

British steel trading company

- Type: Private company
- Industry: Steel trading
- Predecessor: Coutinho, Caro & Co (London) Ltd
- Founded: 1951, London
- Headquarters: London, England
- Number of locations: 30 (in 24 countries)
- Area served: Worldwide
- Key people: Oppenheimer family
- Products: Semi-finished, flat, long tubes and pipes, stainless steel
- Services: Steel trading, shipping and logistics, distribution, stock holding, finance, mining and raw materials
- Revenue: ▲US$10 billion (2011)
- Number of employees: 300
- Website: stemcor.com

Stemcor is a British steel trading and distribution company. The company acts as an intermediary between buyers and sellers of steel and raw materials. It provides additional services, including logistics, price risk management and inventory management.

It is one of the world's largest independent steel traders and operates in 45 countries. In 2012, the company's turnover exceeded £5 billion. However, since then, the company has undergone a number of restructurings after the company built up large debts and defaulted on an $850 million debt.

The largest shareholder of Stemcor is the US distressed investment fund Apollo Global Management.

== History ==
Stemcor was founded in 1951 as the London subsidiary of the German trading company Coutinho, Caro & Co. The company was founded by Herbert Coutinho and German immigrant Hans Oppenheimer, each taking half a stake in the business.

Coutinho's stake was acquired by the US construction group McDermott International, then J McDermott, in 1984. In 1987, the Oppenheimer family gained full control of the business after buying out its American co-owner. On completion of the deal the company changed its name from Coutinho, Caro & Co to Stemcor, an abbreviation of Steel Marketing Corporation.

Ralph Oppenheimer, the son of the company's co-founder, was chairman of executive chairman of the company between 1982 and 2013. Margaret Hodge, chair of the Parliamentary Public Accounts Committee, is a sister of Ralph Oppenheimer and a shareholder in the company.

Oppenheimer drove expansion of the business through a series of acquisitions, including Steel Service Center, Aryan Mining & Trading Corporation, Barclay and Mathieson, Brahmani River Pellets and Steel Plate & Sections.

Between 2000 and 2012, the company's turnover grew from £1 billion to £5.1 billion. The growth and acquisitions were fueled by debt.

=== Financial difficulties and re-structuring ===
In 2013, due to high levels of debt, the company defaulted on an $850 million loan. The Financial Times said that falling steel prices has damaged the profitability of the business.

In 2014, Stemcor negotiated a restructuring deal on $1.3 billion of debt. The company agreed to repay $1.3 billion over two years by selling or closing a number of subsidiaries. As part of the deal, the Oppenheimers remained majority shareholders but lost control of the Board.

In 2015, a further restructuring of the business was announced, with debt holders agreeing to write off $1.5 billion. As part of the restructuring, the debt holders had their loans converted to equity and Apollo became the largest shareholder of the business.

The deal also led to a splitting of the business into two parts. The company was split into its steel and distribution business, which continued as Stemcor, and Moorgate Industries, which would hold a "troubled" Indian ore asset.

== Operations ==
The company is headquartered in Saint Helier, Jersey. It has operations in 45 countries, including in North America, South American, Europe, Africa, Asia and Australia.

=== Products and services ===
The company acts as an intermediary between steel suppliers and buyers. The company says that it offers customers 3,500 different grades of steel and raw materials.

As well as connecting suppliers and purchasers, the company also provides logistics (including handling, load and shipping), price risk management, stockholding and special products for the oil, gas and automotive industries.
