= Jubilee (ward) =

Electoral area in a London borough

- Electoral ward for the Enfield London Borough Council
- Jubilee ward boundaries since 2022
- Borough: Enfield
- County: Greater London
- Population: 16,546 (2021) (Note: 2021 Census data reported for 2022 ward boundaries)
- Electorate: 10,221 (2022)
- Area: 3.971 square kilometres (1.533 sq mi)

Current electoral ward
- Created: 1965
- Councillors: Chinelo Anyanwu; Alev Cazimoglu; Ian Barnes
- GSS code: E05013684 (2022–present)

Jubilee is an electoral ward in the London Borough of Enfield. The ward has existed since the creation of the borough on 1 April 1965 and was first used in the 1964 elections. It returns three councillors to Enfield London Borough Council.

== Enfield council elections since 2022 ==
There was a revision of ward boundaries in Enfield in 2022.

=== 2026 ===
Jubilee (3)
Party	Candidate	Votes	%	±%
Reform	Murat Alma			
Liberal Democrats	Tulay Bacak			
Labour	Ian Barnes			
Labour	Alev Cazimoglu			
Conservative	Lansana Conteh			
Enfield Community Independents	Kevin Cordes			
Reform	Candace Cruickshank			
Liberal Democrats	Ayse Ekici			
Liberal Democrats	Derya Ekici			
Labour	Susan Erbil			
Conservative	Josh Guillen-Caamano			
Green	Kay Heather			
Enfield Community Independents	Shehzad Jummun			
Reform	Sophie Kingsbury			
Conservative	Leonard Munasinghe			
Turnout				

=== 2024 by-election ===
The by-election took place on 28 November 2024, following the resignation of Nesil Caliskan.

2024 Jubilee by-election
Party	Candidate	Votes	%	±%
Labour	Ian Barnes	853		
Conservative	Mohammad Uddin	691		
Independent	Khalid Sadur	208		
Green	Katherine Knight	169		
Reform	Neville Watson	149		
Liberal Democrats	Timothy Martin	94		
Turnout				
Labour hold		Swing		

=== 2022 election ===
The election took place on 5 May 2022.

2022 Enfield London Borough Council election: Jubilee
Party	Candidate	Votes	%	±%
Labour	Nesil Caliskan	1,980	65.0	
Labour	Chinelo Anyanwu	1,855	60.9	
Labour	Alev Cazimoglu	1,852	60.8	
Conservative	Glenn Breslin	864	28.4	
Conservative	Frank Greene	786	25.8	
Conservative	Leonard Munasinghe	676	22.2	
Green	Rada Graovac	378	12.4	
Independent	Cemal Sazdili	263	8.6	
Liberal Democrats	Iman Saadoune	230	7.6	
Independent	Sherryton Lewis	129	4.2	
Independent	Don McGowan	121	4.0	
Turnout			32.3	
Labour win (new boundaries)				
Labour win (new boundaries)				
Labour win (new boundaries)				

== 2002–2022 Enfield council elections ==
Jubilee ward boundaries from 2002 to 2022

There was a revision of ward boundaries in Enfield in 2002.

=== 2018 election ===
The election took place on 3 May 2018.

2018 Enfield London Borough Council election: Jubilee
Party	Candidate	Votes	%	±%
Labour	Nesil Caliskan	2,132	64.5	
Labour	Alev Cazimoglu	2,132	64.5	
Labour	Bernie Lappage	2,110	63.8	
Conservative	Glenn James Breslin	772	23.4	
Conservative	Ratip Al Sulaimen	746	22.6	
Conservative	Eric Charles Jukes	712	21.5	
Green	Benjamin James Gill	248	7.5	
UKIP	Constantine Manuel Baritz	164	5.0	
Liberal Democrats	Richard Morgan-Ash	160	4.8	
Turnout		3,305	35.7	
Labour hold		Swing		
Labour hold		Swing		
Labour hold		Swing		

=== 2015 by-election ===
The by-election was held on 7 May 2015, on the same day as the 2015 United Kingdom general election. It followed the resignation of Rohini Simbodyal.

2015 Jubilee by-election
Party	Candidate	Votes	%	±%
Labour	Nesil Cazimoglu	3,313	59.2%	
Conservative	Nazim Celebi	1,339	23.9%	
UKIP	Sharon Downer	602	10.8%	
Green	Benjamin Maydon	229	4.2%	
Liberal Democrats	Matt McLaren	108	1.9%	
Majority		1,974	11.3	
Turnout		5,591	59.4	
Labour hold		Swing		

=== 2014 election ===
The election took place on 22 May 2014.

2014 Enfield London Borough Council election: Jubilee
Party	Candidate	Votes	%	±%
Labour	Alev Cazimoglu	2,142	24%	
Labour	Bernie Lappage	1,984	22%	
Labour	Rohini Simbodyal	1,939	22%	
Conservative	Nazim Celebi	730	8%	
UKIP	Clive Morrison	633	7%	
Conservative	Tom Waterhouse	604	7%	
Conservative	Alper Kurtaran	603	7%	
Green	Benjamin Maydon	299	3%	
Turnout		8,934		
Labour hold		Swing		
Labour hold		Swing		
Labour hold		Swing		
