= 1982 Islington London Borough Council election =

← 1978	6 May 1982	1986 →

All 52 council seats 27 seats needed for a majority
- Registered: 120,076
- Turnout: 40.1%
	First party	Second party	Third party
Party	Lab	Labour Co-op	Alliance
Last election	35 seats,	1 seat,	New party
Seats before	32	0	14
Seats after	41	10	1
Seat change	▲9	▲10	▼13
Popular vote	48,767	10,358	25,714
Percentage	42.47%	9.02%	22.39%
	Fourth party
Party	Con
Last election	1 seat,
Seats before	1
Seats after	0
Seat change	▼1
Popular vote	27,947
Percentage	24.34%
Council control before election
Labour
Council control after election
Labour

The 1982 Islington Council election took place on 6 May 1982 to elect members of Islington London Borough Council in London, England. The whole council was up for election and the Labour party regained overall control of the council from the Social Democratic Party.

== Background ==
Composition of the council just before the 1982 election

In March 1981 the SDP was founded. In May 1981 Donald Hoodless became the new Labour Leader and council leader. In September 1981, following the resignation of a Labour councillor, the SDP gained a council seat in Hillarton ward. In December 1981 over half of the Labour group on the council resigned the Labour whip and joined the SDP. This gave the SDP a majority of seats and their leader, Jim Evans, became the new council leader. Divisions within the SDP saw the emergence of a separate Social Democrat group that included four sitting SDP councillors. This group stood in the 1982 elections in opposition to official SDP candidates.

== Election result ==
1982 Islington Council election
Party	Seats	Gains	Losses	Net gain/loss	Seats %	Votes %	Votes	+/−
Labour	41	15	6	▲9	78.85	42.47	48,767	
Labour Co-op	10	10	0	▲10	19.23	9.02	10,358	
Alliance	1	0	13	▼13	1.92	22.39	25,714	
Conservative	0	0	1	▼1	0.00	24.34	27,947	
Social Democrat	0	0	5	▼4	0.00	1.17	1,342	
National Front	0	0	0	Steady	0.00	0.23	268	
Communist	0	0	0	Steady	0.00	0.21	239	
Independent SDP	0	0	0	Steady	0.00	0.10	111	
Workers Revolutionary	0	0	0	Steady	0.00	0.05	61	
Save London Action Group	0	0	0	Steady	0.00	0.02	18	
Total	52						114,825	

== Ward results ==
(*) – Indicates incumbent councillors standing for re-election

=== Barnsbury ===
Barnsbury (3)
Party	Candidate	Votes	%
Labour	Alexander J Farrell*	1,637	56.2
Labour	Christopher Robert Smith*	1,630	
Labour	Margaret Eve Hodge	1,618	
Alliance	James Lawrie	733	25.1
Alliance	Anna M M Beaumont	701	
Alliance	Antony J Martin	682	
Conservative	John D E Gallagher	544	18.7
Conservative	Simon Melhuish-Hancock	476	
Conservative	David J Wedgwood	462	
Registered electors		6,745	
Turnout			45.5
Labour hold			
Labour hold			
Labour hold			

=== Bunhill ===
Bunhill (3)
Party	Candidate	Votes	%
Labour	Kenneth D. Banham	936	40.06
Labour	Terence J. Herbert	905	
Labour	Christopher T.A. Calnan	905	
Conservative	Arthur H S Hull	778	32.79
Conservative	Patricia M Robertson	758	
Conservative	John G Watson	711	
Alliance	Christie Payne*	595	24.56
Alliance	George A.W. Ives*	560	
Alliance	Joseph R. Trotter	528	
National Front	John Hawkesworth	84	2.58
National Front	George Wilson	50	
National Front	Gordon W Strange	44	
Registered electors		6,838	
Turnout			37.3
Labour gain from Alliance			
Labour hold			
Labour gain from Alliance			

=== Canonbury East ===
Canonbury East (2)
Party	Candidate	Votes	%
Labour	James R Franklin	749	40.70
Labour	Gordon D Young	687	
Alliance	Christopher M. P. Huhne	464	24.32
Alliance	William Moroney	394	
Conservative	Robin J. Cave	357	19.05
Conservative	Alan J.M. Reese	314	
Social Democrat	Ernest J.W. Bayliss*	292	14.91
Social Democrat	Sybil P. James*	233	
Save London Action Group	Paul D. Jenkins	18	1.02
Registered electors		5,037	
Turnout			38.6
Labour gain from Social Democrat			
Labour gain from Social Democrat			

=== Canonbury West ===
Canonbury West (2)
Party	Candidate	Votes	%
Labour	Rosemary A. Nicholson	1,026	32.68
Labour Co-op	Joseph W.H. Simpson	844	26.88
Conservative	Margaret D. Reese	691	21.82
Conservative	Alan N. Spinney	679	
Alliance	James S. Knight	430	13.09
Alliance	Ralph F.W. Skilbeck	391	
Social Democrat	Frederick Johns	176	5.54
Social Democrat	Audrey Bayliss*	171	
Registered electors		4,884	
Turnout			49.5
Labour gain from Social Democrat			
Labour Co-op gain from Social Democrat			

=== Clerkenwell ===
Clerkenwell (3)
Party	Candidate	Votes	%
Labour	Anne Green	874	36.33
Labour	Margaret L. Oliver	864	
Alliance	David Hyams*	823	31.56
Labour	Nikolaos Barstow	822	
Conservative	Donald W. Bromfield	778	29.51
Alliance	Gerald D. Southgate*	701	
Alliance	Doris K.A. Rogers*	700	
Conservative	Reginald H. Brown	675	
Conservative	Arthur C.J. Bush	625	
Workers Revolutionary	Richard Price	61	2.60
Registered electors		7,068	
Turnout			35.8
Labour gain from Alliance			
Labour gain from Alliance			
Alliance hold			

=== Gillespie ===
Gillespie (2)
Party	Candidate	Votes	%
Labour	Eric W Brown	878	57.42
Labour	Carol O'Brien*	869	
Conservative	Andrew J.B. Mitchell	389	24.57
Conservative	Ann Comninos	358	
Alliance	Anna Berent	286	18.00
Alliance	Vernon Joynson	261	
Registered electors		4,178	
Turnout			41.0
Labour hold			
Labour hold			

=== Highbury ===
Highbury (3)
Party	Candidate	Votes	%
Labour	Peter A Broadbent	1,407	35.18
Labour	Smarajit Roy	1,309	
Labour Co-op	Derek Hines	1,308	33.89
Conservative	Simon R. Matthews	673	16.50
Conservative	Jennifer Moody	631	
Alliance	Margot Joan Dunn	626	14.43
Conservative	James A. Rooke	608	
Alliance	David A. Howell	546	
Alliance	James Picton	498	
Registered electors		6,706	
Turnout			41.5
Labour hold			
Labour hold			
Labour Co-op gain from Labour			

=== Highview ===
Highview (2)
Party	Candidate	Votes	%
Labour	Bob Crossman	891	61.85
Labour	Maureen Leigh	856	
Alliance	James C Evans*	328	22.72
Alliance	John D. Barnes	314	
Conservative	George F. Benham	245	15.43
Conservative	Max L.L. Termeer	190	
Registered electors		3,889	
Turnout			40.5
Labour gain from Alliance			
Labour hold			

=== Hillmarton ===
Hillmarton (2)
Party	Candidate	Votes	%
Labour	Arthur L. Bell*	1,162	60.66
Labour	Peter C. Powell	1,000	
Conservative	Lucia G. Chrisodouldes	438	20.37
Alliance	Tim Johnson	438	15.94
Alliance	Kevin O'Keefe*	414	
Conservative	Roy P.C. Taft	288	
Communist	Mark W. Page	54	3.03
Registered electors		5,204	
Turnout			43.5
Labour hold			
Labour gain from Alliance			

=== Hillrise ===
Hillrise (3)
Party	Candidate	Votes	%
Labour	Alan M. Clinton	1,426	
Labour Co-op	Milton K. Babulall	1,254	
Labour	William J. Sillett	1,220	
Conservative	Kenneth E.J. Graham	676	
Conservative	Michael J. Peters	653	
Conservative	Paul R. Ostway	635	
Alliance	Donald R.D. Hutchinson	512	
Alliance	Lize Evans	496	
Alliance	Efimia M. Marinos	443	
Registered electors		6,451	
Turnout			43.5
Labour hold			
Labour Co-op gain from Conservative			
Labour hold			

=== Holloway ===
Holloway (3)
Party	Candidate	Votes	%
Labour	Edward M Holroyd-Doveton*	1,083	56.67
Labour	Rosemary Dale	1,081	
Labour	David L Yorath	971	
Conservative	William H. Giles	431	20.77
Alliance	Patrick McCann	408	20.12
Conservative	Mark A.H. Rittner	369	
Alliance	John Dipre	354	
Alliance	Jeffrey J. Littman	352	
Conservative	Gail M. Ansel-Lilley	349	
National Front	Alan B. Butler	53	2.44
National Front	Harry Fenton	37	
Registered electors		6,862	
Turnout			31.5
Labour hold			
Labour hold			
Labour hold			

=== Junction ===
Junction (3)
Party	Candidate	Votes	%
Labour	Maurice J. Barnes	1,450	36.11
Labour Co-op	Taha T Karim	1,376	33.13
Labour Co-op	Derek A. Sawyer	1,283	
Conservative	Timothy R. Devlin	728	17.56
Conservative	Kingsley G. Manning	712	
Conservative	David J. Nicholson	675	
Alliance	Mary McCann	558	13.20
Alliance	Roy Albert James Lincoln	517	
Alliance	Patrick Sheeran	516	
Registered electors		6,341	
Turnout			44.7
Labour hold			
Labour Co-op gain from Labour			
Labour Co-op gain from Labour			

=== Mildmay ===
Mildmay (3)
Party	Candidate	Votes	%
Labour	Patrick E. Haynes	1,579	36.39
Labour	Marjorie A Ogilvy-Webb*	1,566	
Labour Co-op	Valerie A Veness*	1,354	31.32
Conservative	Leonard A. Hatcher	761	17.23
Conservative	Richard F. Hewitt	754	
Conservative	Stanley W. Morris	719	
Alliance	Stephen R. Hatch	591	13.44
Alliance	Zara D. Tracy	586	
Alliance	Raymond C. James	568	
Communist	William J. Norris	70	1.62
Registered electors		8,445	
Turnout			38.0
Labour hold			
Labour hold			
Labour Co-op gain from Labour			

=== Quadrant ===
Quadrant (2)
Party	Candidate	Votes	%
Labour	David G.S. Rees	1,085	33.65
Labour Co-op	Keith R. Veness	922	28.60
Conservative	Nicholas B. Baile	599	18.02
Alliance	Valerie M. Iles	592	17.90
Conservative	Merryl S. Cave	562	
Alliance	Mary I Campbell	561	
Social Democrat	Charles V. Connell	60	1.83
Social Democrat	Carole M. Murphy	57	
Registered electors		5,494	
Turnout			44.0
Labour hold			
Labour Co-op gain from Labour			

=== St George's ===
St George's (3)
Party	Candidate	Votes	%
Labour	Patricia J. Longman	1,401	51.83
Labour	Sandra Marks	1,388	
Labour	Victor I. McGeer	1,329	
Conservative	Albert V. Hiam	638	23.56
Conservative	Kenneth Hynes	629	
Conservative	Sally Mustoe	606	
Alliance	David J. Davies*	442	15.82
Alliance	Michele Byam	415	
Alliance	Piers M. Herbert	399	
Social Democrat	Gerard F. Flynn*	122	4.45
Social Democrat	Elizabeth Barry	118	
Communist	Angela M. Mason	115	4.34
Social Democrat	Hugh F. Flynn	113	
Registered electors		7,525	
Turnout			37.3
Labour gain from Alliance			
Labour gain from Social Democrat			
Labour hold			

=== St Mary ===
St Mary (3)
Party	Candidate	Votes	%
Labour	George R. Hayes	890	45.23
Labour	Barbara Rogers	825	
Labour	Mohammad A.K. Khan	791	
Conservative	Alistair R. Goobey	605	32.39
Conservative	Neil David Kerr	601	
Conservative	Edmund T.L. Holden	587	
Alliance	Alan Pedrick*	451	22.37
Alliance	Evelyn H. Jacomb	430	
Alliance	Niranjan S. Mukherjee	358	
Registered electors		5,529	
Turnout			37.5
Labour hold			
Labour hold			
Labour gain from Alliance			

=== St Peter ===
St Peter (3)
Party	Candidate	Votes	%
Labour	Anne L. Page*	1,069	42.52
Labour	Paul N. Mullin	979	
Labour	John A. Worker	929	
Alliance	Christopher J. Price*	711	28.76
Conservative	John L.K. Eden	702	
Conservative	Sarah G.M.R. Goobey	655	
Alliance	Robert N.W. Oakeshott	653	28.72
Conservative	Hugo H.F. Summerson	652	
Alliance	Diana M.S. Simpkins	648	
Registered electors		7,137	
Turnout			37.1
Labour hold			
Labour gain from Alliance			
Labour hold			

=== Sussex ===
Sussex (2)
Party	Candidate	Votes	%
Labour Co-op	Jan Whelan	1,012	64.19
Labour Co-op	Ian S. Wilson	1,005	
Alliance	Ellen M. Brosnan*	399	23.60
Alliance	Henry J Reid*	342	
Conservative	Nigel V.A. Shervey	270	12.21
Conservative	Elizabeth M. Stephens	244	
Conservative	Phillips A. Langton	62	
Registered electors		4,236	
Turnout			44.3
Labour Co-op gain from Alliance			
Labour Co-op gain from Alliance			

=== Thornhill ===
Thornhill (2)
Party	Candidate	Votes	%
Labour	Charles H. Chapman	882	59.25
Labour	Sally E.A. Gilbert	815	
Conservative	Terence P. Kelly	293	19.40
Conservative	Marina Y. Oliver	263	
Alliance	Particia M. Peel	255	17.45
Alliance	Valerie M. Bolitho	244	
Independent SDP	Alan Ernest Lomas	61	3.91
Independent SDP	Valerie Lomas	50	
Registered electors		4,570	
Turnout			35.0
Labour hold			
Labour hold			

=== Tollington ===
Tollington (3)
Party	Candidate	Votes	%
Labour	David Aitchison	1,701	41.88
Labour	Kathleen Bundred	1,699	
Labour Co-op	Christopher M. Bromley	1,583	39.00
Alliance	Andrew Carty*	507	12.15
Alliance	Arthur G. Smith*	490	
Alliance	Kathleen Carty	483	
Conservative	Edward F. Bull	377	6.97
Conservative	Abdul A. Siddiqui	247	
Conservative	Feeroz J. Siddiqui	225	
Registered electors		6,937	
Turnout			40.8
Labour gain from Alliance			
Labour gain from Alliance			
Labour Co-op gain from Labour			
