= Barking (constituency) =

Parliamentary constituency in the United Kingdom, 1945 onwards

Coordinates: 51.53°N 0.11°E

- Borough constituency for the House of Commons
- Interactive map of boundaries from 2024
- Location within Greater London
- County: Greater London
- Population: 134,500 (2022)
- Electorate: 71,822 (March 2020)
- Borough: London Borough of Barking and Dagenham
- Major settlements: Barking and Becontree

Current constituency
- Created: 1945
- Member of Parliament: Nesil Caliskan (Labour)
- Created from: Romford

Barking is a constituency (Note: A borough constituency (for the purposes of election expenses and type of returning officer)) in Greater London represented in the House of Commons of the UK Parliament since 2024 by Nesil Caliskan of the Labour Party.

== Constituency profile ==
The constituency is located in the east of Greater London within the London Borough of Barking and Dagenham. It is entirely urban and includes the town of Barking, the western part of Dagenham and the residential area of Becontree.

Economic activity in the area was historically dominated by fishing and shipbuilding. Becontree is the largest council estate in the country and, upon its completion in the 1930s, was said to be the largest in the world. Average household income in the constituency is similar to the rest of the country, but considerably lower than the rest of London. Residents are generally younger, more deprived and less likely to own a house than the national average. The constituency is ethnically diverse; 42% of residents are White, 28% are Asian and 22% are Black.

In the most recent borough council election in 2022, every seat in the constituency was won by the Labour Party. Unlike most of London, Barking constituency is estimated to have voted in favour of leaving the European Union in the 2016 referendum, with the option receiving around 60% of the vote.

== Political history ==
The area has elected Labour MPs since its creation in 1945, on strong majorities of over 20% of the vote, except for the results in 1983, 1987 and 1992. Margaret Hodge served as the MP for the seat from 1994 to 2024.

The rise in support for the British National Party since the turn of the 21st century saw the party attain 16.9% of the vote at the 2005 general election, with the Labour vote reduced by over 13% compared to the 2001. The BNP out-polled the Liberal Democrats for third place and were just 27 votes behind the Conservatives.

Party members and supporters were optimistic that the party would soon make a breakthrough into the UK parliament, and party leader Nick Griffin stood in Barking for the 2010 general election. However, his performance in Barking was poor, as he polled 14.6% of the vote (representing a decline in percentage terms compared to 2005), and Margaret Hodge retained the seat with 54.3% of the vote, doubling her majority. The Conservatives came second with 17.8%. During the run-up to the 2010 election, filmmaker Laura Fairrie had access to the British National Party and Labour Party campaigns, and later produced a documentary The Battle for Barking, which premiered on More 4 on 30 November 2010.

In 2015, the UKIP vote increased to almost 23%; this was predicted as they came the runners up in every ward in the 2014 Barking and Dagenham Council election, they came within 200 votes of winning 4 seats on the council.

In 2017, the UKIP vote collapsed, and Labour and the Conservatives both increased their share of the vote, although Labour's increase of 10.1% saw them claim 67.8% of the vote overall (their largest share in Barking at any election since the 1994 by-election and the greatest at a general election since 1970), increasing their majority from 35.5% to 45.3%. Despite a swing away from Labour in the 2019 election, its majority was still a healthy 34.7%.

Following Margaret Hodge's retirement as an MP, Labour's vote at the 2024 general election fell by 16.5%; however its majority only fell by 4.4% as the Conservative vote collapsed to 11.8%. Both Reform UK (14.2%) and the Green Party (13.7%) overtook the Conservatives, relegating them to fourth place. The Workers Party candidate took 9.8% of the vote.

== Boundaries ==
Dates	Areas	Maps	Boundary changes
1945–1974	The Municipal Borough of Barking.		Formerly part of the constituency of Romford.
1974–1983	The London Borough of Barking wards of Abbey, Cambell, Gascoigne, Longbridge, and Manor.		Minor changes following creation of London Borough of Barking.
1983–1997	The London Borough of Barking and Dagenham wards of Abbey, Cambell, Eastbury, Gascoigne, Goresbrook, Longbridge, Manor, Parsloes, and Thames.		Minor changes following changes to ward boundaries and names.
1997–2010	The London Borough of Barking and Dagenham wards of Abbey, Becontree, Cambell, Eastbury, Gascoigne, Goresbrook, Longbridge, Manor, Parsloes, and Thames.		Minor changes following changes to ward boundaries and names.
2010–2024	The London Borough of Barking and Dagenham (2010) wards of Abbey, Alibon, Becontree, Eastbury, Gascoigne, Goresbrook, Longbridge, Mayesbrook, Parsloes, Thames, and Valence. Note that the ward boundaries and some ward names changed in 2022.		Following their review of parliamentary representation the Boundary Commission for England recommended that the wards of Alibon, Parsloes and Valence be transferred from the old Dagenham constituency to Barking, and that following a review of ward boundaries a small part of River ward be transferred from Barking to help form the new Dagenham and Rainham constituency. These boundaries were first contested for the 2010 general election.
2024–present	The London Borough of Barking and Dagenham wards of Abbey; Alibon (majority); Barking Riverside; Becontree; Eastbury; Gascoigne; Goresbrook (most); Longbridge; Mayesbrook; Northbury; Parsloes (most); Thames View; Valence (part). (Note: Taking account of the revised ward boundaries from 2022)		Further to the 2023 review of Westminster constituencies, which came into effect for the 2024 general election, the Valence ward (as it existed on 1 December 2020) was moved to Dagenham and Rainham in order to bring the electorate within the permitted range.

== Members of Parliament ==
Election	Member	Party
1945	Somerville Hastings	Labour
1959	Tom Driberg	Labour
Feb 1974	Jo Richardson	Labour
1994 by-election	Margaret Hodge	Labour
2024	Nesil Caliskan	Labour

== Elections ==
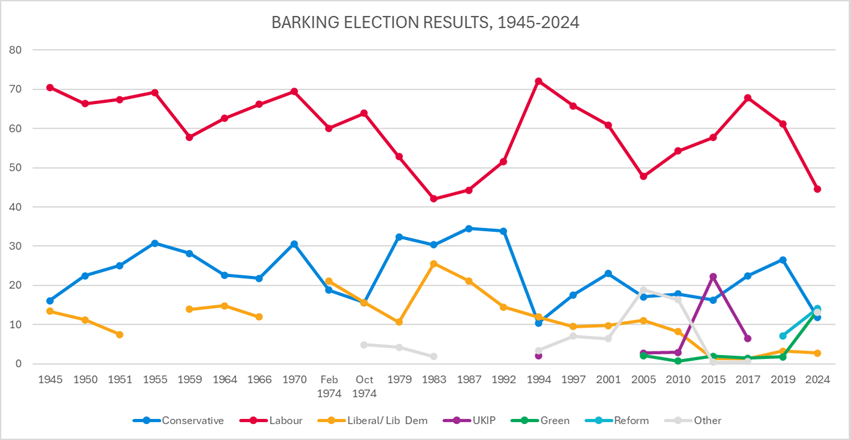
Election results 1945–2024

=== Elections in the 2020s ===
General election 2024: Barking
Party	Candidate	Votes	%	±%
Labour	Nesil Caliskan	16,227	44.5	−16.5
Reform	Clive Peacock	5,173	14.2	+7.1
Green	Simon Anthony	4,988	13.7	+11.8
Conservative	Julie Redmond	4,294	11.8	−15.1
Workers Party	Muhammad Asim	3,578	9.8	N/A
Liberal Democrats	Charley Hasted	1,015	2.8	−0.5
Independent	Dee Dias	753	2.1	N/A
CPA	Lucy Baiye-Gaman	449	1.2	N/A
Majority		11,054	30.3	−3.8
Turnout		36,477	45.7	−11.4
Registered electors		79,825		
Labour hold		Swing	−11.8	

=== Elections in the 2010s ===
2019 notional result (Note: Estimate of the 2019 general election result as if the revised boundaries recommended under the 2023 boundary review were in place)
Party	Vote	%
Labour	24,996	60.9
Conservative	11,003	26.8
Brexit Party	2,914	7.1
Liberal Democrats	1,356	3.3
Green	750	1.8
Majority	13,993	34.1
Turnout	41,019	57.1
Electorate	71,822	

General election 2019: Barking
Party	Candidate	Votes	%	±%
Labour	Margaret Hodge	27,219	61.2	−6.6
Conservative	Tamkeen Shaikh	11,792	26.5	+4.0
Brexit Party	Karen Batley	3,186	7.2	N/A
Liberal Democrats	Ann Haigh	1,482	3.3	+2.0
Green	Shannon Butterfield	820	1.8	+0.3
Majority		15,427	34.7	−10.7
Turnout		44,499	57.1	−4.8
Registered electors		77,946		
Labour hold		Swing	−5.3	

General election 2017: Barking
Party	Candidate	Votes	%	±%
Labour	Margaret Hodge	32,319	67.8	+10.1
Conservative	Minesh Talati	10,711	22.5	+6.2
UKIP	Roger Gravett	3,031	6.4	−15.8
Green	Shannon Butterfield	724	1.5	−0.5
Liberal Democrats	Pauline Pearce	599	1.3	–0.1
Independent	Noel Falvey	295	0.6	N/A
Majority		21,608	45.3	+9.8
Turnout		47,679	61.9	+3.7
Registered electors		77,022		
Labour hold		Swing	+2.0	

General election 2015: Barking
Party	Candidate	Votes	%	±%
Labour	Margaret Hodge	24,826	57.7	+3.4
UKIP	Roger Gravett	9,554	22.2	+19.3
Conservative	Mina Rahman	7,019	16.3	−1.5
Green	Tony Rablen	879	2.0	+1.3
Liberal Democrats	Peter Wilcock	562	1.3	−6.9
TUSC	Joseph Mambuliya	183	0.4	N/A
Majority		15,272	35.5	−1.0
Turnout		43,023	58.2	−3.2
Registered electors		73,977		
Labour hold		Swing	−8.0	

General election 2010: Barking
Party	Candidate	Votes	%	±%
Labour	Margaret Hodge	24,628	54.3	+7.6
Conservative	Simon Marcus	8,073	17.8	+1.8
BNP	Nick Griffin	6,620	14.6	−2.8
Liberal Democrats	Dominic Carman	3,719	8.2	−4.0
UKIP	Kellie Maloney	1,300	2.9	−0.2
Christian	George Hargreaves	482	1.1	N/A
Green	Jayne Forbes	317	0.7	−1.7
Monster Raving Loony	Crucial Chris Dowling	82	0.2	N/A
Independent	Thomas Darwood	77	0.2	N/A
Restoration Party	Dapo Sijuwola	45	0.1	N/A
Majority		16,555	36.5	+5.8
Turnout		45,343	61.4	+11.0
Registered electors		73,868		
Labour hold		Swing	+2.9	

=== Elections in the 2000s ===
2005 notional result
Party	Vote	%
Labour	17,760	46.7
BNP	6,608	17.4
Conservative	6,073	16.0
Liberal Democrats	4,622	12.2
Others	2,952	7.8
Turnout	38,015	50.4
Electorate	75,382	

General election 2005: Barking
Party	Candidate	Votes	%	±%
Labour	Margaret Hodge	13,826	47.8	−13.1
Conservative	Keith Prince	4,943	17.1	−5.9
BNP	Richard Barnbrook	4,916	17.0	+10.6
Liberal Democrats	Toby Wickenden	3,211	11.1	+1.4
UKIP	Terry Jones	803	2.8	N/A
Green	Laurie Cleeland	618	2.1	N/A
Independent	Demetrious Panton	530	1.8	N/A
Workers Revolutionary	Mick Saxby	59	0.2	N/A
Majority		8,883	30.7	−7.2
Turnout		28,906	50.1	+4.6
Registered electors		57,658		
Labour hold		Swing	−3.6	

General election 2001: Barking
Party	Candidate	Votes	%	±%
Labour	Margaret Hodge	15,302	60.9	−4.9
Conservative	Mike Weatherley	5,768	23.0	+5.4
Liberal Democrats	Anura Keppetipola	2,450	9.8	+0.3
BNP	Mark Tolman	1,606	6.4	+3.7
Majority		9,534	37.9	−10.3
Turnout		25,126	45.5	−16.2
Registered electors		55,229		
Labour hold		Swing	−5.1	

=== Elections in the 1990s ===
General election 1997: Barking
Party	Candidate	Votes	%	±%
Labour	Margaret Hodge	21,698	65.8	+13.6
Conservative	Keith Langford	5,802	17.6	−16.3
Liberal Democrats	Mark Marsh	3,128	9.5	−4.4
Referendum	Colin Taylor	1,283	3.9	N/A
BNP	Mark Tolman	894	2.7	N/A
ProLife Alliance	Damien Mearns	159	0.5	N/A
Majority		15,896	48.2	+29.8
Turnout		32,964	61.7	−7.4
Registered electors		53,458		
Labour hold		Swing	+14.9	

- Changes are based on the notional 1992 election result, not the 1994 by-election.

1992 notional result
Party	Vote	%
Labour	20,409	52.2
Conservative	13,229	33.9
Liberal Democrats	5,436	13.9
Turnout	39,074	69.1
Electorate	56,574	

1994 Barking by-election
Party	Candidate	Votes	%	±%
Labour	Margaret Hodge	13,704	72.1	+20.5
Liberal Democrats	Gary White	2,290	12.0	−2.5
Conservative	Theresa May	1,976	10.4	−23.5
National Front	Gary Needs	551	2.9	N/A
UKIP	Gerard Batten	406	2.1	N/A
Natural Law	Heather Butensky	90	0.5	N/A
Majority		11,414	60.0	+42.3
Turnout		19,017	38.3	−31.7
Registered electors		49,635		
Labour hold		Swing	+11.5	

General election 1992: Barking
Party	Candidate	Votes	%	±%
Labour	Jo Richardson	18,224	51.6	+7.3
Conservative	John Kennedy	11,956	33.9	−0.6
Liberal Democrats	Stephen Churchman	5,133	14.5	−6.8
Majority		6,268	17.8	+7.9
Turnout		35,313	70.0	+3.0
Registered electors		50,454		
Labour hold		Swing	+3.9	

=== Elections in the 1980s ===
General election 1987: Barking
Party	Candidate	Votes	%	±%
Labour	Jo Richardson	15,307	44.3	+2.2
Conservative	William Sharp	11,898	34.4	+4.1
Liberal	John Gibb	7,366	21.3	−4.3
Majority		3,409	9.8	−1.9
Turnout		34,541	66.9	+1.6
Registered electors		51,639		
Labour hold		Swing	−1.0	

General election 1983: Barking
Party	Candidate	Votes	%	±%
Labour	Jo Richardson	14,415	42.1	−11.3
Conservative	Hugo Summerson	10,389	30.4	−1.2
Liberal	John Gibb	8,770	25.6	+14.8
National Front	Ian Newport	646	1.9	−2.3
Majority		4,026	11.8	−10.1
Turnout		34,220	65.4	−5.7
Registered electors		52,362		
Labour hold		Swing	−5.1	

=== Elections in the 1970s ===
1979 notional result
Party	Vote	%
Labour	20,172	53.4
Conservative	11,906	31.5
Liberal	4,088	10.8
Others	1,591	4.2
Turnout	37,757	
Electorate		

General election 1979: Barking
Party	Candidate	Votes	%	±%
Labour	Jo Richardson	18,111	52.8	−11.1
Conservative	Marion Roe	11,103	32.4	+16.8
Liberal	Martin Taylor	3,679	10.7	−4.9
National Front	Ian Newport	1,021	3.0	−1.9
Independent Labour	John Barry	400	1.2	N/A
Majority		7,008	20.4	−27.9
Turnout		34,314	71.1	+3.7
Registered electors		48,289		
Labour hold		Swing	−14.0	

General election October 1974: Barking
Party	Candidate	Votes	%	±%
Labour	Jo Richardson	21,546	63.9	+3.8
Conservative	Eric Forth	5,256	15.6	−3.2
Liberal	Martin Taylor	5,245	15.6	−5.5
National Front	C. Bond	1,661	4.9	New
Majority		16,290	48.3	+9.3
Turnout		33,706	67.4	−9.2
Registered electors		50,039		
Labour hold		Swing	+3.5	

General election February 1974: Barking
Party	Candidate	Votes	%	±%
Labour	Jo Richardson	22,846	60.1	−9.3
Liberal	Martin Taylor	8,012	21.1	N/A
Conservative	Eric Forth	7,154	18.8	−11.8
Majority		14,834	39.0	+0.3
Turnout		38,012	76.6	+15.0
Registered electors		49,617		
Labour hold		Swing	−15.2	

General election 1970: Barking
Party	Candidate	Votes	%	±%
Labour	Tom Driberg	21,097	69.4	+3.2
Conservative	Geoffrey Pattie	9,309	30.6	+8.8
Majority		11,788	38.8	−5.6
Turnout		30,406	61.6	−10.4
Registered electors		49,363		
Labour hold		Swing	−2.8	

=== Elections in the 1960s ===
General election 1966: Barking
Party	Candidate	Votes	%	±%
Labour	Tom Driberg	22,994	66.2	+3.5
Conservative	Geoffrey Pattie	7,584	21.8	−0.7
Liberal	James Silvey	4,181	12.0	−2.8
Majority		15,410	44.4	+4.2
Turnout		34,759	72.0	−1.2
Registered electors		48,281		
Labour hold		Swing	+2.1	

General election 1964: Barking
Party	Candidate	Votes	%	±%
Labour	Tom Driberg	23,055	62.6	+4.8
Conservative	Geoffrey Waterer	8,296	22.6	−5.7
Liberal	Nicholas Donahue	5,463	14.8	+0.9
Majority		14,759	40.1	+10.5
Turnout		36,814	73.2	−5.4
Registered electors		50,326		
Labour hold		Swing	+5.3	

=== Elections in the 1950s ===
General election 1959: Barking
Party	Candidate	Votes	%	±%
Labour	Tom Driberg	23,454	57.8	−11.4
Conservative	Kenneth Dibben	11,454	28.2	−2.6
Liberal	David Evans	5,648	13.9	N/A
Majority		12,000	29.6	−8.8
Turnout		40,556	78.5	+5.0
Registered electors		51,654		
Labour hold		Swing	−4.4	

General election 1955: Barking
Party	Candidate	Votes	%	±%
Labour	Somerville Hastings	27,129	69.2	+1.8
Conservative	Bernard Massey	12,082	30.8	+5.7
Majority		15,047	38.4	−4.0
Turnout		39,211	73.5	−8.3
Registered electors		53,314		
Labour hold		Swing	−2.0	

General election 1951: Barking
Party	Candidate	Votes	%	±%
Labour	Somerville Hastings	30,486	67.4	+1.1
Conservative	Michael Underhill	11,340	25.1	+2.6
Liberal	Norman Cork	3,387	7.5	−3.7
Majority		19,146	42.3	−1.5
Turnout		45,213	81.9	−1.7
Registered electors		55,219		
Labour hold		Swing	−0.8	

General election 1950: Barking
Party	Candidate	Votes	%	±%
Labour	Somerville Hastings	30,299	66.3	−4.1
Conservative	Kenneth Glenny	10,269	22.5	+6.4
Liberal	Harry Willcock	5,109	11.2	−2.3
Majority		20,030	43.9	−10.5
Turnout		45,677	83.6	+10.8
Registered electors		54,627		
Labour hold		Swing	−5.3	

=== Elections in the 1940s ===
General election 1945: Barking
Party	Candidate	Votes	%
Labour	Somerville Hastings	24,504	70.5
Conservative	Kenneth Glenny	5,593	16.1
Liberal	Harry Willcock	4,674	13.4
Majority		18,911	54.4
Turnout		34,771	72.8
Registered electors		47,770	
Labour win (new seat)			
