= 1994 Barking by-election =

UK parliamentary by-election

- 9 June 1994

Barking parliamentary seat
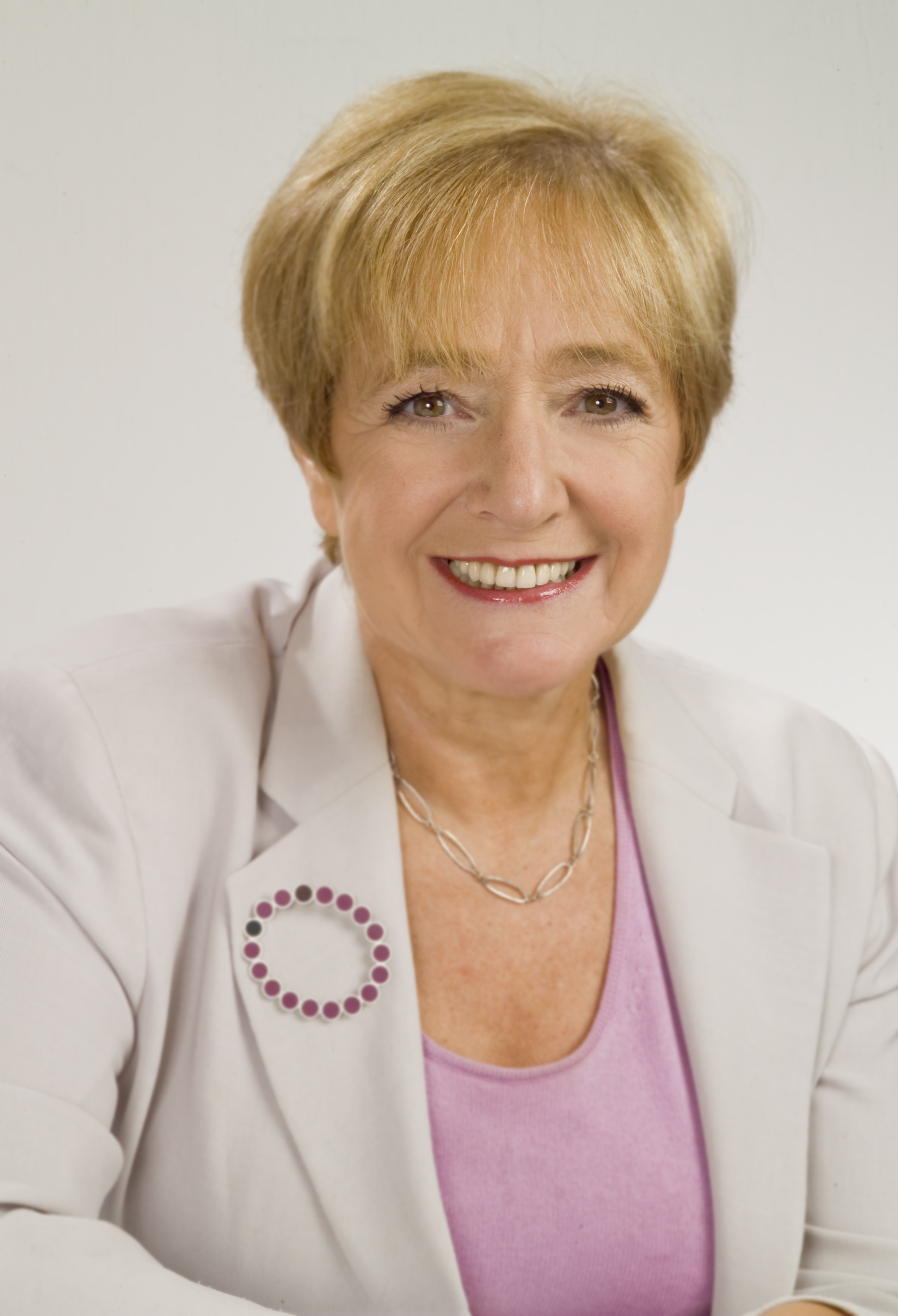

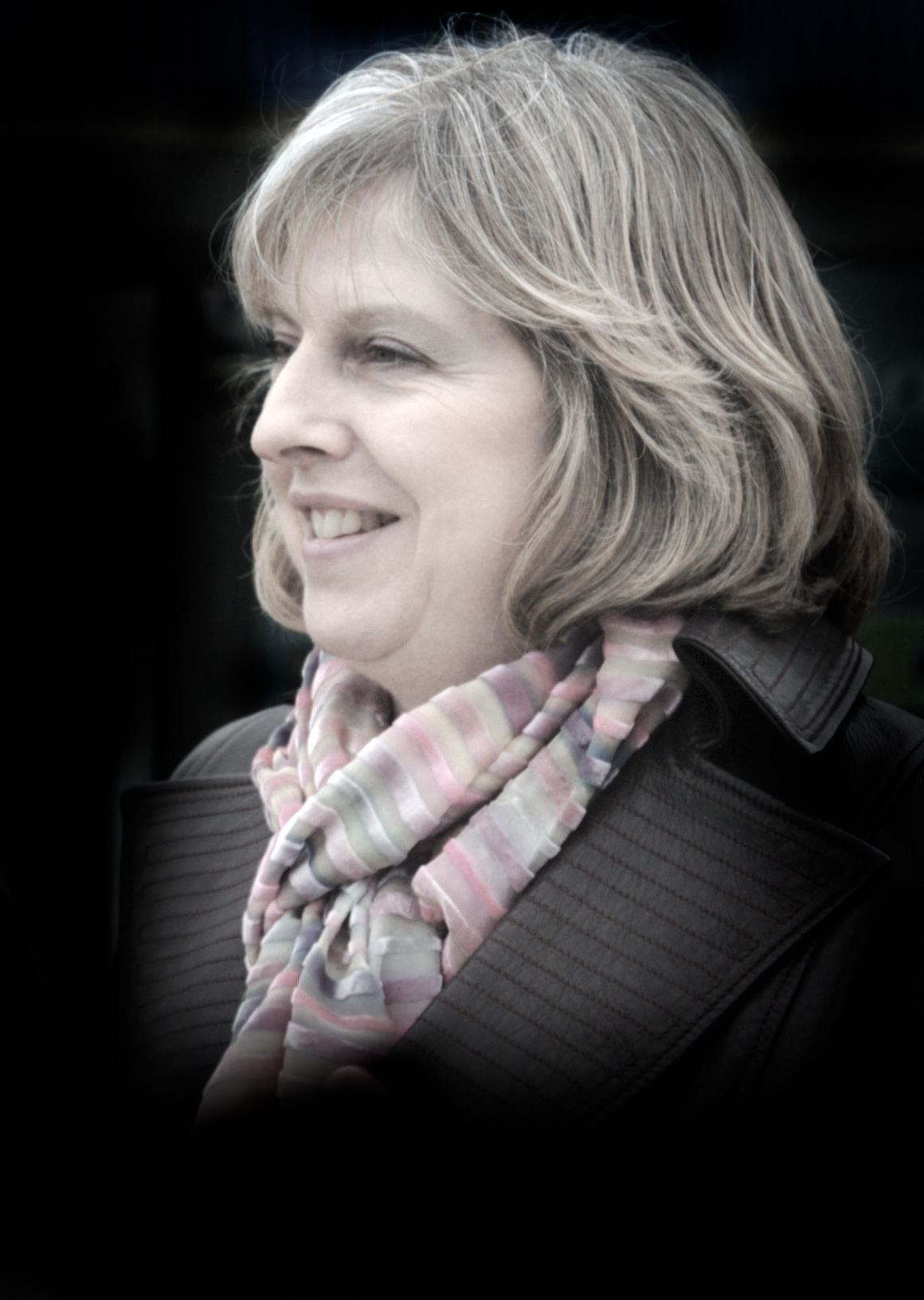
	First party	Second party	Third party
		LD
Candidate	Margaret Hodge	Gary White	Theresa May
Party	Labour	Liberal Democrats	Conservative
Popular vote	13,704	2,290	1,976
Percentage	72.06%	12.04%	10.39%
Swing	▲20.46 pp	▼2.50 pp	▼23.47 pp
MP before election
Jo Richardson
Labour
Subsequent MP
Margaret Hodge
Labour

The 1994 Barking by-election was held on 9 June 1994, following the death of Labour Party Member of Parliament for Barking Jo Richardson. Richardson had represented the seat since the February 1974 general election, following Tom Driberg.

The seat had been continuously held by Labour since it was created in 1945, and Richardson had retained her seat comfortably at the 1992 general election with an increased majority of over 6,000. Margaret Hodge, leader of Islington London Borough Council from 1982 to 1992, was selected as the Labour candidate and was the clear favourite to hold the seat at the by-election.

The Conservative Party had taken second place in 1992. John Kennedy, the candidate in 1992, was not selected to fight the 1994 by-election, the Conservative nomination going instead to Theresa May. She had been a councillor in the London Borough of Merton from 1986 to 1994, and had stood (and lost) in the safe Labour seat of North West Durham in 1992. Having lost two of the three previous by-elections of the Parliament to the Liberal Democrats, and failing to challenge Labour in the third, the Conservatives were not hopeful of gaining ground.

The Liberal Democrat candidate, Steve Churchman, had taken little more than a tenth of the votes cast in 1992, continuing a downward track since 1983. A new candidate, Garry White, at 21 the youngest parliamentary by-election candidate chosen by a British political party since universal suffrage, was chosen for the by-election.

Three other candidates stood: Gary Needs of the National Front, Gerard Batten of the UK Independence Party (UKIP), and HR Butensky of the Natural Law Party.

== Result ==
As expected, Hodge won the seat easily, with the Labour majority almost doubling, despite a turnout below 40%. The Liberal Democrats share of the votes declined slightly, but they still managed to push the Conservatives into third place, as they had a month before in Rotherham. The other three candidates all lost their deposits.

Barking by-election, 1994
Party	Candidate	Votes	%	±%
Labour	Margaret Hodge	13,704	72.1	+20.5
Liberal Democrats	Gary White	2,290	12.0	−2.5
Conservative	Theresa May	1,976	10.4	−23.5
National Front	Gary Needs	551	2.9	New
UKIP	Gerard Batten	406	2.1	New
Natural Law	HR Butensky	90	0.5	New
Majority		11,414	60.1	+42.4
Turnout		19,017	38.3	−31.7
Registered electors		49,635		
Labour hold		Swing	+22.0	

== Previous result ==
General election 1992: Barking
Party	Candidate	Votes	%	±%
Labour	Jo Richardson	18,224	51.6	+7.3
Conservative	John G. Kennedy	11,956	33.9	−0.6
Liberal Democrats	Stephen W. Churchman	5,133	14.5	−6.7
Majority		6,268	17.7	+7.9
Turnout		35,313	70.0	+3.1
Registered electors		50,454		
Labour hold		Swing	+3.9	

== Legacy ==
At the 1997 UK general election, Hodge retained the seat with an increased majority. May went on to be elected as MP for Maidenhead in 1997 and then became Prime Minister in 2016. Two other candidates in Barking in 1994 also stood in 1997: Needs contested Devon East for the National Democrats, and Batten contested Harlow for UKIP: both again secured only a few hundred votes. Batten was elected as a UKIP Member of the European Parliament for London in 2004. Batten and May both appeared on a ballot paper together again, 23 years later, when Batten stood against her in Maidenhead at the 2017 general election. Batten later became the Leader of the UK Independence Party in 2018.

== See also ==
- Barking (constituency)
- Barking
- Lists of United Kingdom by-elections
- By-election
