= Liechtenstein disclosure facility =

The Liechtenstein Disclosure Facility (LDF) is an agreement between the governments of Liechtenstein and the United Kingdom which enables UK citizens to declare previously undisclosed assets to Her Majesty's Revenue and Customs (HMRC). The LDF, which came into force on 1 September 2009, is a subsidy designed to encourage individuals voluntarily to regularize their affairs. The scheme offers more favourable terms than other tax investigations, with participants normally receiving a fine of 10 per cent of tax due instead of 100 per cent, with tax interest and penalties only sought for the previous 10 years rather than the previous 20 years.

== Background ==
Following the 2008 Liechtenstein tax affair, the Liechtenstein financial centre worked to develop a solution with the Organisation for Economic Co-operation and Development (OECD) to promote compliance within the country. The Liechtenstein task force was led by Fritz Kaiser, executive chairman at wealth management firm Kaiser Partner, and the conclusion was a pledge to transparency called the Liechtenstein Declaration. A direct outcome of this pledge was a solution for UK taxpayers to disclose previously undeclared offshore assets called the Liechtenstein Disclosure Facility, an approach to compliance developed by Philip Marcovici, a now retired tax lawyer, independent member of the board of Kaiser Partner and an advisor to the Liechtenstein Government. Philip Marcovici and Fritz Kaiser received an award from Spear's for their work in relation to the Liechtenstein Disclosure Facility and related arrangements.

== Structure of the LDF agreement ==
The details of the LDF are outlined in a ‘'Memorandum of Understanding'’ between the Liechtenstein authorities and HMRC. Under the agreement, Liechtenstein banks and other financial intermediaries are required to identify 'relevant persons' (i.e. accounts with UK addresses which might have UK tax liability) and contact them about their tax affairs. These 'relevant persons' must then register with HMRC that they wish to use the LDF and provide their financial institution with a relevant certificate. But for those with assets already in Liechtenstein or who create a 'footprint' in the country, disclosure can be made voluntarily without prior contact from a financial institution. This means those who have undeclared assets in another offshore jurisdiction can bring that account within the terms of the LDF by opening a new account in Liechtenstein. Once registered under the LDF, an individual has up to 10 months to complete their disclosure to HMRC. Tax liabilities declared under the LDF only need to cover the timeframe after 6 April 1999 rather than the standard 20 year assessment period. Furthermore, when under a tax investigation, an individual could be exposed to 20 years of back taxes plus interest, a potential 100 per cent penalty or criminal prosecution. However, under the LDF, there is normally only a 10 per cent penalty as well as assurance that no criminal investigation will be initiated.

== Outcome ==
Writing in STEP Magazine, Dr. Ariel Sergio Goekmen of Kaiser Partner Privatbank AG compared the benefits of the LDF with the UK-Swiss tax agreement. He writes that "It seems the view of the tax planning and accounting industry is that currently the LDF is the best and probably the cheapest route for concerned parties who wish to regularise their tax affairs and regain full control of the underlying assets". He notes that the success of the LDF is due to the fact that it is structured, safe, can be implemented very quickly and can be used to regain control over globally diversified assets.

In an interview with Accountancy Age, the UK's permanent secretary for tax, Dave Hartnett, estimated 1,200 people had now used the LDF and that returns from declarations might reach £3 billion rather than the £1 billion originally predicted. The popularity of the scheme resulted in an extension of the original 2015 deadline to 5 April 2016 however the Chancellor George Osborne used his final 2015 Budget statement of this Parliament to announce an unexpected early closure date of 31 December 2015.
