= 1978 Islington London Borough Council election =

← 1974	4 May 1978	1982 →

All 52 council seats up for election 27 seats needed for a majority
- Registered: 117,884
- Turnout: 38.7%
	First party	Second party	Third party
Party	Lab	Con	Labour Co-op
Last election	60 seats,	0 seats,	0 seats,
Seats before	52	0
Seats after	48	2	2
Seat change	▼12	▲2	▲2
Popular vote	54,262	42,014	1,804
Percentage	49.62%	38.42%	1.65%
	Fourth party
Party	National Front
Last election	0 seats
Seats before	0
Seats after	0
Popular vote	6,149
Percentage	5.62%
Council control before election
Labour
Council control after election
Labour

The 1978 Islington Council election took place on 4 May 1978 to elect members of Islington London Borough Council in London, England. The whole council was up for election and the Labour Party stayed in overall control of the council.

== Background ==
Since the last election, the council had changed the boundaries of their wards as such: Changes to wards from 1974 to 1978

Ward	1974 election	1978 election
Bunhill	2 seats	3 seats
Canonbury	4 seats	Ward divided
Canonbury East	Part of Canonbury Ward	2 seats
Canonbury West	Part of Canonbury Ward	2 seats
Gillespie	Didn't exist	2 seats
Highbury	4 seats	3 seats
Highview	3 seats	2 seats
Holloway	4 seats	3 seats
Junction	4 seats	3 seats
Mildmay	4 seats	3 seats
Parkway	3 seats	Ward abolished
Pentonville	3 seats	Ward abolished
Quadrant	4 seats	2 seats
Station	2 seats	Ward Abolished
Sussex	Didn't exist	2 seats
Tollington	Didn't exist	3 seats

Overall the size of the council shrunk by 8, going from 60 councillors to 52 councillors

== Election result ==
1978 Islington Borough Council election
Party	Seats	Gains	Losses	Net gain/loss	Seats %	Votes %	Votes	+/−
Labour	48	9	17	▼8	92.31	49.62	54,262	
Conservative	2	2	0	▲2	3.84	38.42	42,014	
Labour Co-op	2	2	0	▲2	3.84	1.65	1,804	
National Front	0	0	0	Steady	0.00	5.62	6,149	
Liberal	0	0	0	Steady	0.00	2.22	2,426	
Independent	0	0	0	Steady	0.00	1.20	1,315	
Communist	0	0	0	Steady	0.00	0.67	731	
Socialist Unity	0	0	0	Steady	0.00	0.55	603	
Workers Revolutionary	0	0	0	Steady	0.00	0.04	46	
Total	52						109,350	

== Ward results ==
(*) - Represents an incumbent candidate

(‡) - Represents an incumbent from a ward that was split into two separate wards

=== Barnsbury ===
Barnsbury (3)
Party	Candidate	Votes	%
Labour	Christopher R. Smith	1,257	
Labour	Cecilia McAskill	1,235	
Labour	Alexander J. Farrell	1,221	
Conservative	John D.E. Gallagher	923	
Conservative	Gillian A. Gallagher	915	
Conservative	George B. Skelly	882	
National Front	Lawrence O'Brien	171	
National Front	Arthur R. Jupp	164	
National Front	Frederick G. Atkin	163	
Liberal	John W. Hamilton	132	
Liberal	David J. Trillo	115	
Communist	Maria Loftus	107	
Registered electors		6,355	
Turnout			42.2
Labour hold			
Labour hold			
Labour hold			

=== Bunhill ===
Bunhill (3)
Party	Candidate	Votes	%
Labour	George A.W. Ives*	1,338	
Labour	Edna K. Browning*	1,326	
Labour	Christie Payne	1,317	
Conservative	Peter H. Britten	1,110	
Conservative	Patricia M. Robertson	1,070	
Conservative	John G. Watson	1,049	
National Front	Joseph Cohen	257	
National Front	Frank A. Benson	247	
National Front	Gordon H. Shergold	237	
Workers Revolutionary	Kay G. Wrightson	46	
Registered electors		7,135	
Turnout			40.1
Labour hold			
Labour hold			
Labour win (new seat)			

=== Canonbury East ===
Canonbury East (2)
Party	Candidate	Votes	%
Labour	Ernest J.W. Bayliss^{‡}	801	
Labour	Sybil P. James	708	
Conservative	Nicholas B. Baile	462	
Conservative	George H.C. Bennett	450	
National Front	Leslie A. Powell	109	
National Front	John R. Smith	99	
Liberal	John P. Hudson	76	
Liberal	John H. Marshall	50	
Registered electors		4,249	
Turnout			34.6
Labour win (new seat)			
Labour win (new seat)			

=== Canonbury West ===
Canonbury West (2)
Party	Candidate	Votes	%
Labour	Audrey Bayliss	865	
Conservative	Colin S. Miller	853	
Conservative	Alan J.M. Reese	820	
Labour	Frederick W.H. Sandford	766	
Liberal	Patricia M. Duncan	146	
Liberal	Philip G. Watkins	126	
National Front	Colin Woolgrove	104	
National Front	Robert Woolgrove	87	
Registered electors		4,689	
Turnout			42.9
Labour win (new seat)			
Conservative win (new seat)			

=== Clerkenwell ===
Clerkenwell (3)
Party	Candidate	Votes	%
Labour	David Hyams*	1,224	
Labour	Doris K.A. Rogers	1,088	
Labour	Gerald D. Southgate*	1,083	
Conservative	Donald W. Bromfield	1,082	
Conservative	Rita M. Bromfield	1,033	
Conservative	Stanley W. Morris	969	
National Front	Michael Harris	238	
National Front	Richard Chambers	235	
National Front	Edward Wilcox	191	
Liberal	Colin A. Muntzer	156	
Registered electors		7,804	
Turnout			35.3
Labour hold			
Labour hold			
Labour hold			

=== Gillespie ===
Gillespie (2)
Party	Candidate	Votes	%
Labour	Patricia A. Bradbury	864	
Labour	Carol O'Brien	814	
Conservative	Nigel J. Bradley	616	
Conservative	Marie B.T. Philipsz	499	
Liberal	Margot J. Dunn	127	
Liberal	Niranjian S. Mukherjee	111	
National Front	Stephen Boon	63	
National Front	Henry Green	51	
Communist	Sarah J. Benton	44	
Registered electors		4,562	
Turnout			38.8
Labour win (new seat)			
Labour win (new seat)			

=== Highbury ===
Highbury (3)
Party	Candidate	Votes	%
Labour	Patricia Brown*	1,537	
Labour	Jennifer Morris	1,414	
Labour	Catherine S. Powloski	1,371	
Conservative	Simon R. Matthews	1,179	
Conservative	Christina F. Rooke	1,104	
Conservative	Alan N. Spinney	1,082	
National Front	Anthony W. Perry	129	
National Front	Anthony R. Wood	127	
National Front	Rory A. Bevan	126	
Liberal	Muriel Pidcock	122	
Liberal	Michael R. Shipman	116	
Liberal	Arthur W.R. Capel	112	
Registered electors		7,268	
Turnout			43.0
Labour hold			
Labour hold			
Labour hold			
Labour loss (seat eliminated)			

=== Highview ===
Highview (2)
Party	Candidate	Votes	%
Labour	James C. Evans*	746	
Labour	Patrick Sheeran	643	
Conservative	Sheilagh M. Barrett	572	
Conservative	Douglas Gerrard-Reynolds	544	
Socialist Unity	Michael A. Sullivan	115	
Socialist Unity	James Gosling	105	
National Front	Harry Fenton	48	
Liberal	Lorna M. James	46	
National Front	Irene McCleod	45	
Liberal	Ruth C. Smith	36	
Registered electors		4,212	
Turnout			37.9
Labour hold			
Labour hold			
Labour loss (seat eliminated)			

=== Hillmarton ===
Hillmarton (2)
Party	Candidate	Votes	%
Labour	Arthur L. Bell*	987	
Labour	Crispin R. St. Hill	881	
Conservative	George H. Leeson	768	
Conservative	Roy P.C. Taft	714	
National Front	Terence F. Savage	120	
National Front	George Wilson	86	
Communist	Margaret S. Beardon	65	
Registered electors		5,212	
Turnout			38.8
Labour hold			
Labour hold			

=== Hillrise ===
Hillrise (3)
Party	Candidate	Votes	%
Labour	Mary McCann*	858	
Conservative	Neil D. Kerr	843	
Labour	John Barnes	819	
Labour	Jack Lethbridge	808	
Conservative	Roman Kowalski	792	
Conservative	Timothy S.K. Yeo	730	
Socialist Unity	Kathryn Adams	110	
Socialist Unity	Michael P. Simpson	97	
National Front	Harold A. Farey	44	
National Front	John J. Taylor	40	
National Front	William Hall	34	
Registered electors		5,207	
Turnout			37.4
Labour hold			
Conservative gain from Labour			
Labour hold			

=== Holloway ===
Holloway (3)
Party	Candidate	Votes	%
Labour	Patrick E. Haynes*	1,065	
Labour	William J.D. Moroney*	1,021	
Labour	Edward Holroyd-Doveton*	983	
Conservative	Anne V. Bradley	575	
Conservative	William H. Giles	573	
Conservative	Merryl S. Cave	545	
National Front	Sidney A. Chaney	146	
National Front	George W. Gilder	134	
National Front	Shaun P. Bowdidge	123	
Registered electors		6,019	
Turnout			33.5
Labour hold			
Labour hold			
Labour hold			
Labour loss (seat eliminated)			

=== Junction ===
Junction (3)
Party	Candidate	Votes	%
Labour	Christopher M.B. King	1,504	
Labour	Catherine D. Kaplinsky	1,439	
Labour	Mark S.B. Van de Weyer*	1,402	
Conservative	David J. Nicholson	1,088	
Conservative	Jonathan Sayeed	986	
Conservative	Michael D.X. Portillo	980	
National Front	Clifford NF Baker	97	
National Front	Anthony J. Hedge	97	
National Front	Ian Binnie	96	
Registered electors		6,428	
Turnout			44.2
Labour hold			
Labour hold			
Labour hold			
Labour loss (seat eliminated)			

=== Mildmay ===
Mildmay (3)
Party	Candidate	Votes	%
Labour	Marjorie A. Ogilvy-Webb	1,489	
Labour	Jane L. Streather	1,442	
Labour	Valerie A. Veness	1,383	
Conservative	Anne Felton-Gerber	1,037	
Conservative	Elizabeth M. Carlson	1,032	
Conservative	James A. Rooke	989	
Independent	Terence B. Hernstead	210	
National Front	Sandra McKenzie	209	
National Front	Alan B. Butler	202	
National Front	Derek J. McGranaghan	202	
Independent	Lawrence O'Shea	182	
Independent	John C. Score	165	
Liberal	Raymond C. James	150	
Liberal	Jannette Dawson	147	
Liberal	Peter Murphy	134	
Communist	William J. Norris	76	
Registered electors		8,467	
Turnout			46.9
Labour hold			
Labour hold			
Labour hold			
Labour loss (seat eliminated)			

=== Quadrant ===
Quadrant (2)
Party	Candidate	Votes	%
Labour	Anthony J. Mooney	1,179	
Labour	Janet B. Gibson	1,149	
Conservative	Arthur H.S. Hull	901	
Conservative	Marion J. Pike	872	
National Front	David F. Hammond	190	
National Front	Gordon W. Strange	157	
Registered electors		5,764	
Turnout			43.0
Labour hold			
Labour hold			
Labour loss (seat eliminated)			
Labour loss (seat eliminated)			

=== St George's ===
St George's (3)
Party	Candidate	Votes	%
Labour	David J. Davies*	1,199	
Labour	Gerrard F. Flynn	1,182	
Labour	Philomena Kershaw	1,169	
Conservative	Kenneth E.J. Graham	1,104	
Conservative	Albert V. Hiam	1,030	
Conservative	Edmund N.T. Tickell	1,005	
Communist	Angela Mason	212	
National Front	Andrew Desmond	135	
National Front	Terry List	112	
National Front	Thomas Pollard	99	
Registered electors		7,291	
Turnout			37.5
Labour hold			
Labour hold			
Labour hold			

=== St Mary ===
St Mary (3)
Party	Candidate	Votes	%
Labour	Alan Pedrick	1,027	
Labour	Donald B. Hoodless*	990	
Labour	Ian S. Wilson	981	
Conservative	Alistair R. Goobey	823	
Conservative	Christopher C. McCann	772	
Conservative	Michael A. Kuhn	744	
Communist	Marie Betteridge	196	
National Front	Richard B. Hughes	161	
National Front	Richard J. Tiley	123	
National Front	Alfred J. Aldris	119	
Liberal	Alison J. Norman	119	
Liberal	Ronald E. Sanderson	87	
Registered electors		6,017	
Turnout			37.7
Labour hold			
Labour hold			
Labour hold			

=== St Peter ===
St Peter (3)
Party	Candidate	Votes	%
Labour	Anne L. Page*	1,188	
Labour	Christopher J. Pryce	1,063	
Labour	Martin P. Reynolds*	1,014	
Conservative	Francis M. Haddon-Cave	958	
Conservative	Rupert M. Stephenson	955	
Conservative	Marten G. Tasker	947	
Liberal	William A.A. Bearnish	160	
Liberal	Norma Heigham	158	
National Front	David Faulkner	153	
National Front	Leonard Dark	147	
National Front	David Tedder	141	
Communist	Edward C. Archer	107	
Registered electors		7,228	
Turnout			36.7
Labour hold			
Labour hold			
Labour hold			

=== Sussex ===
Sussex (2)
Party	Candidate	Votes	%
Labour	Ellen M. Brosnan	887	
Labour Co-op	Henry J. Reid	781	
Conservative	Anthony B. Anderson	381	
Conservative	Nigel M. Cumber	354	
National Front	Ian J. Macarthur	70	
National Front	Graham P. Southern	51	
Registered electors		3,757	
Turnout			38.4
Labour win (new seat)			
Labour Co-op win (new seat)			

=== Thornhill ===
Thornhill (2)
Party	Candidate	Votes	%
Labour	Margaret Pitt	777	
Labour	Margaret Watson	736	
Conservative	Terence P. Kelly	521	
Conservative	Marina Y. Oliver	500	
Independent	Frederick Johns	388	
Independent	Timothy F. Finch	334	
Independent	Richard D. Gilbey	36	
Registered electors		4,289	
Turnout			42.2
Labour hold			
Labour hold			
Labour loss (seat eliminated)			

=== Tollington ===
Tollington (3)
Party	Candidate	Votes	%
Labour	Arthur G. Smith	1,027	
Labour Co-op	Andrew Carty	1,023	
Labour	Rose L. Evans	989	
Conservative	Edward F. Bull	455	
Conservative	Martyn D.M. Berkin	434	
Conservative	Abdul A. Siddiqui	392	
National Front	Frederick Shepherd	100	
Socialist Unity	Diana Udall	97	
National Front	Keith Squire	83	
Socialist Unity	Adrian E. Yeeles	79	
National Front	Mark Squire	77	
Registered electors		5,931	
Turnout			31.4
Labour win (new seat)			
Labour Co-op win (new seat)			
Labour win (new seat)			
