= Keeping Left =

1950 manifesto published in the UK by 12 Labour MPs

Keeping Left was a manifesto published in the United Kingdom in 1950 signed by 12 Labour Members of Parliament, 7 of whom had signed Keep Left three years before.
