= Keep Left (pamphlet) =

1947 manifesto advocating democratic socialism

Keep Left was a pamphlet published in the United Kingdom in 1947 by the New Statesman jointly written by Michael Foot, Richard Crossman and Ian Mikardo. It advocated a Social democratic and democratic socialist "third force" foreign policy, a socialist Europe acting independently from either the United States or the Soviet Union, against the pro-American foreign policy of Labour foreign secretary Ernest Bevin. Keep Left was a key statement of the Labour left's dissent from the 1945-51 Labour government.

== See also ==
- Keeping Left
