= Smith baronets of Keighley (1947) =

The Smith baronetcy of Keighley, Yorkshire was created on 28 June 1947 in the Baronetage of the United Kingdom for Bracewell Smith, a hotelier and Conservative politician. He was a Unionist Member of Parliament for Dulwich from 1932 to 1945, and Lord Mayor of London 1946–7.

== Smith baronets, of Keighley, Yorks (1947) ==
- Sir Bracewell Smith, 1st Baronet (1884–1966). Chairman of Park Lane Hotel Ltd and Ritz Hotel Ltd, he was in 1948 made Life President of Arsenal F.C.
- Sir George Bracewell-Smith, 2nd Baronet MBE (1912–1976).
- Sir Guy Bracewell-Smith, 3rd Baronet (1952–1983).
- Sir Charles Bracewell-Smith, 4th Baronet (born 1955), succeeded his brother the 3rd Baronet. He married, firstly in 1977, Carol Hough (died 1994), and secondly in 1996 Nina Kakkar.

There is no heir to the title.

== Extended family ==
Harry Lascelles Carr married in 1933 Eileen Bracewell Smith, daughter of the 1st Baronet. The company directors Clive Carr and Richard Carr are their sons.
