= Charles Bracewell-Smith =

British baronet

Sir Charles Bracewell-Smith, 4th Baronet (born 13 October 1955) is a British businessman. He is the founder of the Homestead Charitable Trust and author of The Song of the Saints.

Bracewell-Smith was educated at Harrow School. He is a grandson of Bracewell Smith and son of George Bracewell Smith. He succeeded to the baronetcy after the death of his brother Sir Guy Bracewell Smith in 1983 at the age of 30.

Bracewell-Smith married Carol Hough in 1977; Hough died in July 1994. He subsequently remarried, in 1996, to Nina Kakkar. He has no children.

Bracewell-Smith, along with cousins Richard Carr and Clive Carr, inherited major shareholdings in Arsenal Football Club from their grandfather Sir Bracewell Smith; Sir Charles transferred his shares to his wife who is now a non-executive director of the club.

Sir Charles and his wife were ranked 834th equal in the Sunday Times Rich List 2007 with an estimated family fortune of £80m.

Baronetage of the United Kingdom
Preceded by Guy Bracewell Smith	Baronet (of Keighley); 1983–present	Incumbent
