= Smith baronets =

Set index for Smith baronets

There have been 25 creations of baronets with the surname Smith (as distinct from Smyth and Smythe).

- Smith baronets of Crantock (1642)
- Smith baronets of Hatherton (1660)
- Smith baronets of Edmondthorpe (1661)
- Smith baronets of Long Ashton (first creation, 1661)
- Smith, later Bowyer-Smyth, baronets of Hill Hall (1661): see Bowyer-Smyth baronets
- Smith baronets of Isleworth (1694)
- Smith, later Bromley, baronets of East Stoke (1757): see Bromley baronets
- Smith baronets of Long Ashton (second creation, 1763)
- Smith, sometime Wyldebore-Smith, later Smith-Marriott baronets of Sydling St Nicholas (1774): see Smith-Marriott baronets
- Smith, later Smith-Dodsworth baronets (1784): see Smith-Dodsworth baronets
- Smith, later Cusack-Smith baronets, of Tuam (1799): see Cusack-Smith baronets
- Smith, later Eardley baronets, of Hadley (1802): see Eardley baronets
- Smith, later Spencer-Smith baronets, of Tring Park (1804): see Spencer-Smith baronets
- Smith baronets of Eardiston (1809)
- Smith baronets of Pickering, Canada (1821): see Sir David William Smith, 1st Baronet (1764–1837)
- Smith, later Smith-Gordon baronets (1838): see Smith-Gordon baronets
- Smith baronets of Aliwal, Punjab (1846): see Harry George Wakelyn Smith (1787–1860)
- Smith baronets of Stratford Place (1897)
- Smith, later Prince-Smith baronets, of Hillbrook (1911): see Prince-Smith baronets
- Smith, later Hamilton-Smith baronets, of Colwyn Bay (1912): see Baron Colwyn
- Smith baronets of Birkenhead (1918): see Baron Birkenhead
- Smith baronets of Kidderminster (1920)
- Smith, later Reardon Smith baronets, of Appledore (1922): see Reardon Smith baronets
- Smith baronets of Crowmallie (1945)
- Smith baronets of Keighley (1947)

== See also ==
- Smyth baronets
- Smythe baronets
