= Dulwich (disambiguation) =

Dulwich is a place in London.

Dulwich may also refer to:

- Dulwich (UK Parliament constituency)
- Dulwich (London County Council constituency)
- Dulwich, South Australia
