= George Aylwen =

621st Lord Mayor of London

Sir George Aylwen Bt
- Aylwen in c1948.

621st Lord Mayor of London
- In office 9 November 1948 – 9 November 1949
- Preceded by: Sir Frederick Wells
- Succeeded by: Sir Frederick Rowland

Personal details
- Born: 12 November 1880 Ilford, Essex
- Died: 27 September 1967 (aged 86) London, England
- Profession: Financier

Sir George Aylwen, 1st Baronet (12 November 1880 – 27 September 1967) was a British financier and the 621st Lord Mayor of London from 1948 to 1949.

== Career ==
In 1896, Aylwen began work as a clerk at stockbrokers J & A Scrimgeour, eventually rising to senior partner by 1948, the year he became Lord Mayor.

Shortly after beginning his career, he was sent to Africa during the Boer War with the Royal Fusiliers. He earned the Queen's Medal with four clasps. Despite being blinded in one eye, he returned to serve with the Royal Fusiliers during the First World War.

He was treasurer of St Bartholomew's Hospital from 1937. Girling Ball – dean of the hospital from 1930 to 1945 – recorded in his diary in 1939 that Aylen treated the clinical staff like children. Aylwen was initially concerned about plans for the development of a National Health Service in the 1940s, worried that it would impede the freedom of the voluntary hospitals and, though he came to support the plans, he used his position as chair of the Voluntary Hospitals Committee for London to ask for existing hospital boards to be kept on.

=== Lord Mayor of London ===
After a term as one of the two sheriffs of the City of London in 1946–7, he was elected Lord Mayor of London on 29 September 1948, to succeed Sir Frederick Wells, and took office on 9 November. Less than a week later, he was the second person to be officially notified of the birth of Charles, Prince of Wales on 14 November, after the Home Secretary, James Chuter Ede, who had to be officially notified himself as the centuries-old tradition that the Home Secretary be present in person for a royal birth was abolished.

In 1949, at the Savoy Hotel he toasted Danny Kaye with "I'd like to see every meeting of ministers preceded by a little turn of Danny Kaye. That might even have an effect on [then Foreign Minister] Mr. Vyshinsky of the Soviet Union". The toast and Kaye's response, beginning "I think emotions are the same the world over", were covered in the papers in both the UK and the US, a fact ridiculed by Life magazine.

At the Lord Mayor's Show on 9 November 1949, when he was being taken to the swearing-in of his successor, Sir Frederick Rowland, the two horses leading his coach bolted into the crowd, hospitalizing around a dozen people. He completed the journey in Sir Frederick's coach instead.

== Honours ==
Aylwen became a knight bachelor of the United Kingdom in the 1942 New Year Honours. He was made a hereditary (to male heirs only) baronet "of Saint Bartholomew's in the City of London" on 25 November 1949. The new baronetcy became extinct upon his death in 1967.

== Personal life ==
He had two daughters, Marjorie, born 1906, and Margaret, born 1909, and two grandchildren, Michael Lampson, born 1936, and David Lampson, born 1939. He divorced his first wife, Edith Eliza Caroline Hill, in 1951 and married playwright Ingraa Elena D'etter Bulgarides.

In 1963, he and his wife, Lady Ingraa Aylwen, employed Archibald Hall (alias Roy Fontaine) as their butler after he impersonated his own employer when Lady Aylwen called to take references. Hall claimed to have stolen jewellery from the Aylwens' guests and to have been seduced by Lady Aylwen. Hall was convicted of four murders in the 1970s, including that of MP Walter Scott-Elliot, and died in prison in 2002.

Civic offices
Preceded by Frederick Wells	Lord Mayor of London; 1948–1949	Succeeded by Frederick Rowland
Baronetage of the United Kingdom
New creation	Baronet (of St Bartholomew's in the City of London); 1949–1967	Extinct
