= Nina Bracewell-Smith =

Indian businesswoman (born 1955)

Lady Bracewell-Smith
- Born: Nina Kakkar; 14 November 1955 (age 70); New Delhi
- Years active: 1995–present
- Spouse: Charles Bracewell-Smith (m. 1996)

Nina, Lady Bracewell-Smith (née Kakkar; born 14 November 1955) is an Indian-born businesswoman who has since March 2013 been based in Monaco. She was a major shareholder and former non-executive director of the Premier League football club Arsenal.

== Background ==
Born in Bonn, she is the daughter of an Indian diplomat. In 1996 she married Sir Charles Bracewell-Smith, 4th Baronet (of Keighley in the County of Yorkshire) at Westminster Register Office. Her husband is the younger son of the former Arsenal director Sir George Bracewell-Smith, 2nd Baronet, who was on the Arsenal board of directors from May 1953 to September 1976. Sir George was in turn the son of the former Arsenal director Sir Bracewell Smith, 1st Baronet, who was chairman from 1948 to 1962.

== Arsenal FC ==
Lady Bracewell-Smith's share in Arsenal comes from the estate of Sir Bracewell Smith, which was split among his grandchildren, Sir Charles Bracewell-Smith, Clive Carr, Richard Carr and Sarah Carr, now Lady Phipps-Bagge. Sir Charles Bracewell-Smith transferred ownership of his shares to his wife, Lady Bracewell-Smith, and she was made a non-executive director of Arsenal in 2005; her appointment increased the membership of Arsenal's Board of Directors to ten.

As of September 2007, Lady Bracewell-Smith owned a 15.9% stake in the club and was the third largest shareholder in the club following Danny Fiszman, with 24.11%, and Red and White Holdings, which is co-owned by Farhad Moshiri and Alisher Usmanov, which owns 24.0% of the equity. In April 2007, she joined with the other board members, her husband’s cousins, as well as Danny Fiszman and the chairman, Peter Hill-Wood, in resisting a take-over by Usmanov, which was believed to have the support of former vice-chairman David Dein. On 17 December 2008 Arsenal Holdings PLC made this announcement: "Lady Nina Bracewell-Smith will be leaving the Boards of the Company and the Club with immediate effect."

On 11 April 2011, she sold her Arsenal shares amounting to 15.9% of club's stake to Stan Kroenke.

On 1 March 2012, she was appointed but removed now Honorary Vice-President of the Club.

== Other business interests ==
Lady Bracewell-Smith was also formerly a director of the Park Lane Sheraton Hotel. The Bracewell-Smith family has strong connections to hotels having previously owned the Ritz Hotel in London, which they sold in 1976, together with a large share of the Paris Ritz; they also held the majority of the shares in the Park Lane Hotel (built by Sir Bracewell Smith in 1920) until its £44m sale in 1996.

She and her husband were ranked 657th in the Sunday Times Rich List 2009 with an estimated family fortune of £85m. She is also 44th on The Sunday Times UK Asian rich list, 72nd on the women list and is in the European Rich List.
