= 1932 Dulwich by-election =

UK parliamentary by-election

← 1931	8 June 1932	1935 →
Candidate	Smith	Cooke-Taylor	Bentwich
Party	Conservative	Liberal	Labour
Popular vote	12,342	3,998	3,905
Percentage	61.0%	19.8%	19.3%
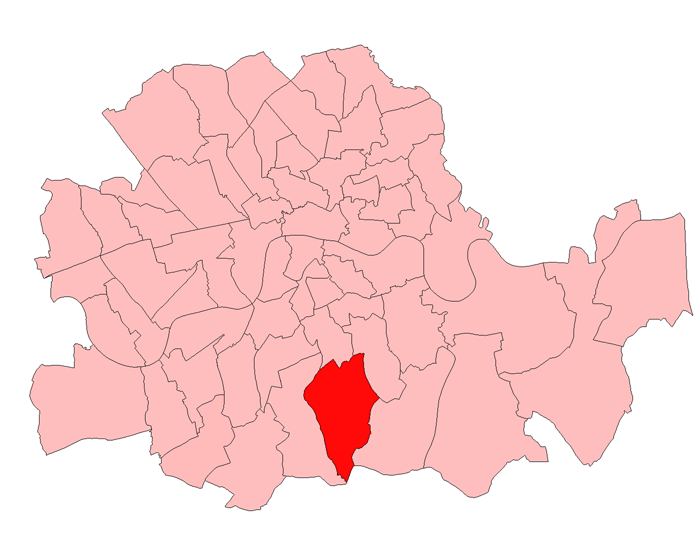
MP before election
Hall
Conservative
Subsequent MP
Smith
Conservative

The 1932 Dulwich by-election was a by-election held on 8 June 1932 for the British House of Commons constituency of Dulwich in South London.

== Vacancy ==
The by-election was triggered by the death of the serving Conservative Party Member of Parliament (MP), Sir Frederick Hall.

== Electoral history ==
The former Conservative member had a large majority and the seat was considered a safe seat for the party. The result of the last election was;

General election 1931: Dulwich
Party	Candidate	Votes	%	±%
Conservative	Frederick Hall	21,752	71.5	
Labour	F. Hughes	4,747	15.6	
Liberal	C. R. Cooke-Taylor	3,924	12.9	
Majority		17,005	55.9	
Turnout		30,423		
Conservative hold		Swing	+18.7	

== Candidates ==
- The Conservative and National candidate was 48-year-old Bracewell Smith, a member of Holborn Borough Council from 1922, serving as Mayor 1931–32, and he served on the London County Council from 1925 to 1928. Smith made his fortune in property. In particular he was a major hotel investor/owner and who built the Park Lane Hotel in 1920.
- The Labour candidate was 40-year-old Helen Bentwich, a trade unionist. She was a niece of the Home Secretary, Sir Herbert Samuel, and had recently returned from Palestine where her husband, Norman Bentwich, had been Attorney-General.
- The Liberal candidate was 49-year-old Dr Charles Cooke-Taylor, a psychiatrist. In 1910 Cooke-Taylor contested Holborn as a candidate of the Liberal Party. Between 1918 and 1931 he contested the Dulwich seat six times, though he never won.

== Campaign ==
The major issues were the stringent financial policies of the National Government, and for the Liberal candidate, opposition to protectionism.

== Result ==
The result was much as expected, with turnout around two-thirds of what it had been in the previous year's general election. The Conservative candidate's majority was slashed in half, but the Liberal candidate slightly increased his vote, pushing Labour into third place.

Dulwich by-election, 1932 Electorate
Party	Candidate	Votes	%	±%
Conservative	Bracewell Smith	12,342	61.0	−10.5
Liberal	C. R. Cooke-Taylor	3,998	19.8	+6.9
Labour	Helen Bentwich	3,905	19.3	+3.7
Majority		8,344	41.2	−14.7
Turnout		20,245	43.0	−27.7
Conservative hold		Swing		

== Aftermath ==
General election 1935: Dulwich Electorate 43,025
Party	Candidate	Votes	%	±%
Conservative	Bracewell Smith	16,870	60.8	
Labour	J V Delahaye	7,142	25.7	
Liberal	C. R. Cooke-Taylor	3,743	13.5	
Majority		9,728	35.1	
Turnout		27,755		
Conservative hold		Swing		

== See also ==
- List of United Kingdom by-elections
- Dulwich constituency
