= David James O'Donoghue =

Irish biographer & editor (1866–1917)

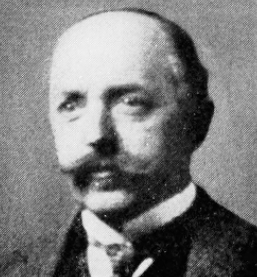
- Born: 22 July 1866; London, England
- Died: 27 June 1917 (aged 50)
- Education: Writer, editor

David James O'Donoghue (22 July 1866 – 27 June 1917) was an Irish biographer and editor.

== Early life ==
David James O'Donoghue was born in 1866 in Chelsea, London, to Irish parents, and grew up in the Hans Town area of Chelsea. He was the son of John O'Donoghue, a bricklayer from Rathkeale, County Limerick, and Bridget Griffin, who was from Kilworth, County Cork. He was the third of nine children, and had four brothers, Thomas, John, James, and Edmund, and four sisters, Mary, Ellen, Katherine, and Agnes. He was first an upholsterer's apprentice from the age of sixteen, before becoming a journalist and author.

== Career ==
He attended a Catholic school and furthered his own education at the British Museum. He began his journalistic work by writing for the Dublin papers upon subjects relating to Irish music, art, and literature. A founder-member of the Irish Literary Society in London, he was also vice president of the National Literary Society, Dublin, and the compiler of a biographical dictionary, The Poets of Ireland (1891–93; revised edition, 1912), with entries on 2,000 authors. He published also:

- Irish Poetry of the Nineteenth Century (1894)
- Humor of Ireland (1894; new edition, 1911)
- List of 1300 Irish Artists (1894)
- The Life and Writings of James Clarence Mangan (1897)
- Bibliographical Catalogue of Collections of Irish Music (1899)
- Geographical Distribution of Irish Ability (1906)

O'Donoghue published an edition of J. F. Lalor's writings (1895) and an edition of William Carleton's Traits and Stories of the Irish Peasantry (four volumes, 1896–97). He edited the works of Samuel Lover (six volumes, 1898–99) and the prose works (1903) and poems (1904) of James Clarence Mangan. He wrote biographies on William Carleton (1896) (whose sisters he rescued from poverty), Richard Pockrich (1899), and Robert Emmet (1902).

In 1896 he moved to Dublin. In 1909 he became librarian of University College Dublin. He was co-editor of Catalogue of the Gilbert Library (in Dublin; 1918). William Butler Yeats wrote of him in his Autobiographies (1938).

He died on 27 June 1917.
