= Richard Carr (businessman) =

British businessman (1938–2025)

Richard Charles Lascelles Carr (22 July 1938 – 11 August 2025) was a British businessman who was director of Arsenal Holdings PLC ("Arsenal") and a director and board member of Arsenal Football Club, which is a wholly owned subsidiary of Arsenal Holdings PLC. He held 2,722 shares (4.6%) in Arsenal until May 2008, when he sold them to Stan Kroenke.

== Life and career ==
Richard Carr was the grandson of former Arsenal Chairman Sir Bracewell Smith through his mother Eileen Smith. His father Henry Lascelles Carr played cricket for Glamorgan, served in the RAF in the Second World War and died in 1943. He married Edda Armbrust in 1960; their daughter, Sue Carr, Baroness Carr of Walton-on-the-Hill, is Lady Chief Justice of England and Wales. Carr remarried in 1968 in Marylebone London to actress Toni Gilpin (real name Antonia McGettigan) until her death in 2016. His half-sister, Sarah, Lady Bagge, held 2% of the shares in the club. His brother Clive Carr is the football club's former Life Vice-President.

Richard Carr had formerly held directorships of Lee Yang Enterprise Limited, the Park Lane Hotel Ltd and Tymals Investments Ltd. Tymals Investments Ltd was dissolved in 1999, the other director was fellow former Arsenal board member Nina Bracewell-Smith.

Carr died on 11 August 2025, at the age of 87.
