= 1887 Dulwich by-election =

UK parliamentary by-election

The 1887 Dulwich by-election was a by-election held on 30 November 1887 for the British House of Commons constituency of Dulwich in South London.

The by-election was triggered by the appointment of the serving Conservative Party Member of Parliament (MP), John Morgan Howard, as a judge in Cornwall.

The Conservative candidate was John Blundell Maple, who had unsuccessfully contested St Pancras South at the 1885 general election. The Liberal candidate was James Henderson.

The main issue in the by-election was the question of Irish Home Rule, which Henderson, a supporter of Gladstone, supported. The Liberal Unionists in the constituency supported Maple.

== Result ==
Dulwich by-election, 1887
Party	Candidate	Votes	%	±%
Conservative	John Blundell Maple	4,021	60.6	N/A
Liberal	James Henderson	2,609	39.4	New
Majority		1,412	21.2	N/A
Turnout		6,630	83.9	N/A
Conservative hold		Swing	N/A	

== See also ==
- List of United Kingdom by-elections
- Dulwich constituency
