= Mark F. Ryan =

Mark Francis Ryan (10 November 1844 – 17 June 1940), was an medical doctor, Irish revolutionary, a leading Member of the Irish Republican Brotherhood and author.

== Family ==
Mark Ryan was born in Uracly in the parish of Kilconly, a few miles from Tuam, County Galway. He was the eldest of eight children of John Ryan (died 1882), a tenant farmer and native of Kilconly, and Bridget Ryan (née Mullahy; died 1880), from Kilcommon, County Mayo. There were eight children, four boys and four girls.

John Ryan had farms in three different parts of Kilconly, one which was held from a landlord known as "French of Tirowen", which is near Gort. Mark was three or four years old when the family were evicted, which took place during the Famine years.

The second farm was in Uí Mháine, land held by a landlord by the name of Dominick Jennings. The family lived here for five or six years, until the landlord died and they were again evicted. They were given shelter for a time from an uncle, Michael Ryan, at Ballynagittagh. After some time John Ryan obtained another holding from Richard Jennings, brother of the late Dominick Jennings, in Ironpool. The family lived here for only a few years, until they were "once more thrown on the roadside", according to Ryan. After this, John Ryan took his family and emigrated to England.

== Education ==
In Uí Mháine, Ryan attended school held in a barn. The teaching was very poor, spelling being the only subject. The instruction was given entirely in English, a strap being used to punish the boys every time Irish was spoken. The second school he attended was in Kilconly, and was held in the chapel, with parish priest Father James Gibbons' permission. The instruction here was much better and consisted of reading, writing and arithmetic, again entirely in English.

He would go on to attend schools at Lissaleen (Lios an Lín) and at Tubberoe. As with the previous schools, instruction was entirely in English, although according to Ryan every child in the parish knew Irish.

The National School system at the time was strongly opposed by the Catholic Archbishop MacHale who claimed it was a Protestant proselytising agency. The first Commissioner appointed to serve on the National Board was the Protestant Archbishop of Dublin, Dr Richard Whately, who attempted to establish a national and non-sectarian system of education in Ireland, on the basis of common instruction for Protestants and Catholics alike in literary and moral subjects, religious instruction being taken apart, similar to the template, almost 200 years later, on which integrated education in Northern Ireland is based.

Catholic archbishop William Crolly offered conditional support but the opposition of the newly- appointed ultramontanist Catholic Archbishop of Dublin, Paul Cullen, made the plan impossible.

Ryan opined that Whately's system was "National" only in name.

== Irish Republican Brotherhood ==
Ryan was recruited to the Irish Republican Brotherhood by Michael Davitt in 1865. He was on the Supreme Council of the IRB in the 1870s, was leader of the Irish National Alliance (1895) and was a founder-member of the Irish Literary Society and the Gaelic League of London (GLL). The GLL had success in the Irish community of London. Ryan regarded the GLL as: "a powerful de-anglicizing and educational agency."

Ryan composed an autobiography entitled Fenian Memories. Ryan, in the forward to his autobiography wrote that, next to his religion, Fenianism had been the most important thing in his life.

== Sources ==
- Fenian Memories, Dr. Mark F. Ryan, Edited by T.F. O'Sullivan, M. H. Gill & Son, LTD, Dublin, 1945
