= Sir Frederick Wells, 1st Baronet =

British businessman and Lord Mayor of London

Sir Frederick Wells Bt

Lord Mayor of London
- In office 1947–1948
- Preceded by: Sir Bracewell Smith
- Succeeded by: Sir George Aylwen

Wells baronets
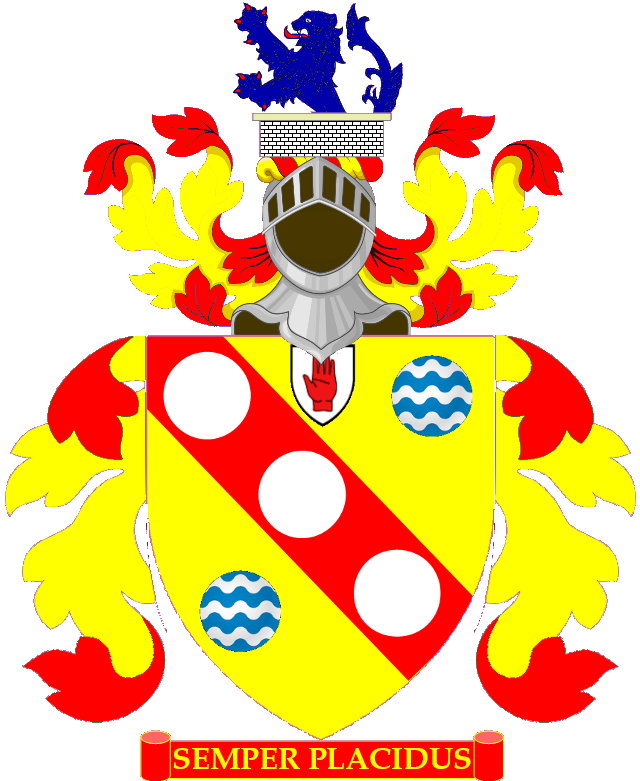
- Escutcheon of the Wells baronets of Hove
- Creation date: 1948
- Status: extinct
- Extinction date: 1966
- Motto: Semper Placidus (always courageous)
- Arms: Or on a bend Gules between two fountains three plates
- Crest: Issuant from a well Proper a demi-lion Azure.

Sir Frederick Michael Wells, 1st Baronet (11 March 1884 – 13 September 1966) was a British businessman who served as Lord Mayor of London from 1947 to 1948.

== Biography ==
The son of Henry Francis Wells, a City merchant, he was educated at St Bonaventure's and the City of London College. At one point, he worked as one of Sir Thomas Lipton's secretaries. He later became managing director of The Sanitas Co., Ltd. and all associated companies.

Wells was an alderman of the City of London from 1941, a sheriff of the City of London from 1945 to 1946, and Lord Mayor of London from 1947 to 1948. He was knighted in 1947 and created a baronet in 1948.

== See also ==
- Wells baronets
