= Sir Jarrit Smyth, 1st Baronet =

Sir Jarrit Smyth, 1st Baronet (1692–1783), previously known as Jarrit Smith, was a British Tory Member of Parliament for Bristol, from 1756 to 1768. He married Florence Smyth, daughter of Sir John Smyth, 3rd Baronet and Elizabeth Asthy.

In addition to being a member of parliament, he was also a lawyer and the first to mine the Long Ashton coalfield. In 1748 after various surveys Jarrit Smyth commissioned mine shafts to be dug at South Liberty Lane.

In 1760 he carried a bill through Parliament to replace the medieval Bristol Bridge which was in a bad state of repair.

His father-in-law died without male issue in 1741; on 27 January 1763 his 1661 baronetcy was recreated for Jarret Smyth as Baronet Smith (or Smyth) of Long Ashton, Somerset (1763) in the Baronetage of Great Britain. The first Baronet was succeeded by his son and subsequently by two nephews. Lack of male issue resulted in the extinction of the baronetcy in 1849.

== Personal papers ==
Bristol Archives holds personal, professional and Parliamentary papers relating to Jarrit Smyth amongst the archives of Ashton Court (Ref. AC/JS) (online catalogue).

Baronetage of Great Britain
New creation	Baronet (of Long Ashton); 1763–1783	Succeeded by John Hugh Smith
