= 1906 Dulwich by-election =

UK parliamentary by-election

← 1906	15 May 1906	1910 →

Candidate	Bonar Law	David Williamson
Party	Conservative	Liberal
Popular vote	6,709	5,430
Percentage	55.3%	44.7%
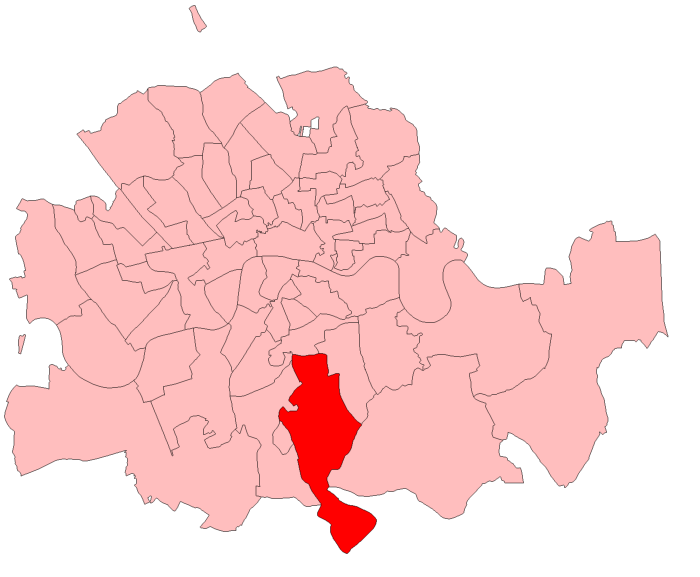
MP before election
Frederick Rutherfoord Harris
Conservative
Subsequent MP
Bonar Law
Conservative

The 1906 Dulwich by-election was a by-election held on 15 May 1906 for the British House of Commons constituency of Dulwich in South London.

The by-election was triggered by the resignation of the serving Conservative Party Member of Parliament (MP), Dr Frederick Rutherfoord Harris, who was moving back to South Africa where he had previously lived for many years. The Unionist candidate was Bonar Law, former Parliamentary Secretary to the Board of Trade who had lost his seat in the Liberal landslide in the February general election. The Liberal Party candidate was David Williamson, who had also contested the February election.

== Result ==
Dulwich by-election, 1906
Party	Candidate	Votes	%	±%
Conservative	Bonar Law	6,709	55.3	+3.9
Liberal	David Williamson	5,430	44.7	−3.9
Majority		1,279	10.6	+6.8
Turnout		12,139	79.4	−5.1
Conservative hold		Swing	+3.9	

The Conservative majority increased by over 900 votes, which the Times attributed not only to Bonar Law's candidature but also to the unpopularity of the Government's Education Bill, suggesting that the Catholic vote, estimated at 700, had gone mostly to the Conservatives as a result.

== See also ==
- List of United Kingdom by-elections
- Dulwich constituency
