= Aylwen baronets =

Extinct baronetcy in the Baronetage of the United Kingdom

The Aylwen baronetcy of St Bartholomew's in the City of London was a title in the Baronetage of the United Kingdom. It was created on 25 November 1949 for Sir George Aylwen, Lord Mayor of London 1948–1949. On his death on 27 September 1967, the baronetcy became extinct.
