= Wilfrid Vernon =

British politician (1882–1975)

Major Wilfrid Vernon

Member of Parliament for Dulwich
- In office 5 July 1945 – 5 October 1951
- Monarch: George VI
- Preceded by: Sir Bracewell Smith
- Succeeded by: Robert Christmas Dewar Jenkins

Personal details
- Born: Wilfrid Foulston Vernon; 1882
- Died: 1 December 1975 (aged 92–93) Bristol, United Kingdom
- Party: Labour

Military service
- Allegiance: United Kingdom
- Branch/service: Royal Naval Volunteer Reserve (RNVR); Royal Air Force (RAF)
- Rank: Major
- Unit: Royal Naval Air Service
- Battles/wars: World War I

Major Wilfrid Foulston Vernon (1882 – 1 December 1975) was a Labour Party politician in the United Kingdom who served as a Member of Parliament (MP) between 1945 and 1951.

== Early life ==
Educated in the Stationers' Company's School and the City and Guilds Technical College in London.

== Career ==
=== Military service ===
Vernon served in the RNVR during the First World War, before becoming a squadron major in the RNAS and was a major in the RAF in its early days.

During 1918 he worked in the flying boat section at Felixstowe airbase and after the war became the chief draughtsman for the British Aeroplane Company. From 1925 to 1937 he worked at the Royal Aircraft Establishment, from which he was dismissed for failing to take proper care of classified information. He had also been earlier implicated in encouraging sedition at the Aldershot army camp.

During the Second World War he was involved in the foundation of the Osterley Park Home Guard School and was an instructor at the Dorking Home Guard Training School until December 1942. He later became a WEA tutor in Bournemouth and Portsmouth.

=== Member of Parliament ===
He was elected MP for Dulwich in the 1945 general election, but lost the seat in the 1951 election. He later served as a member of the London County Council, representing Dulwich and as a councillor in Camberwell.

In January 1948, Vernon gave a speech on China in the House of Commons denouncing Chiang Kai-shek's Nationalist government and endorsing Mao Zedong's Communists. Vernon claimed that "the Chinese government are running one of the most ruthless and cruel police states in existence", and called for Britain to adopt "a policy of friendship and trade with the liberated areas" under Communist control.

Vernon was a member of the Fabian Society.

=== Spying for the Soviet Union ===
In February 1952, Vernon was interrogated by MI5 officer Jim Skardon and admitted having been part of a pre-war Soviet espionage ring.

== Personal life ==
He married Josephine Jervis in 1907, and again after the death of his first wife, to Laura Gladys Meade, in 1918. His second wife died in 1972. They had two children. He died in Bristol at the age of 93.

== Bibliography ==
- Obituary, The Times, 3 December 1975 and "The Very Strange case of Major Vernon – MP and Spy", Duncan Bowie, The Dulwich Society, Journal 205, Summer 2020.
- Leigh Rayment's Historical List of MPs

Parliament of the United Kingdom
Preceded by Sir Bracewell Smith	Member of Parliament for Dulwich; 1945–1951	Succeeded by Robert Christmas Dewar Jenkins
