= Rowland baronets =

Extinct baronetcy in the Baronetage of the United Kingdom

The Rowland Baronetcy, of Taunton in the County of Somerset, was a title in the Baronetage of the United Kingdom. It was created on 20 November 1950 for Sir Frederick Rowland, Lord Mayor of London between 1949 and 1950. The title became extinct on the death of the second Baronet in 1970.

== Rowland baronets, of Taunton (1950) ==
- Sir Frederick Rowland, 1st Baronet (1874–1959)
- Sir Wentworth Lowe Rowland, 2nd Baronet (1909–1970)
