= Samuel Silkin =

British politician and cricketer

The Right Honourable The Lord Silkin of Dulwich PC QC

Shadow Attorney General
- In office 4 May 1979 – 14 July 1979
- Leader: James Callaghan
- Preceded by: Michael Havers
- Succeeded by: John Morris

Attorney General for England and Wales; Attorney General for Northern Ireland
- In office 5 March 1974 – 4 May 1979
- Prime Minister: Harold Wilson; James Callaghan
- Preceded by: Peter Rawlinson
- Succeeded by: Michael Havers

Shadow Solicitor General
- In office 22 July 1970 – 4 March 1974
- Leader: Harold Wilson
- Preceded by: Arthur Irvine
- Succeeded by: Michael Havers

Member of Parliament for Dulwich
- In office 15 October 1964 – 13 May 1983
- Preceded by: Robert Jenkins
- Succeeded by: Gerald Bowden

Personal details
- Born: Samuel Charles Silkin; 6 March 1918 Neath, Wales
- Died: 17 August 1988 (aged 70) Oxford, England
- Party: Labour
- Spouses: Elaine Stamp (m. 1941; died 1984); Sheila Marian (m. 1985)
- Children: 4
- Education: Trinity Hall, Cambridge

Samuel Charles Silkin, Baron Silkin of Dulwich (6 March 1918 – 17 August 1988) was a British Labour Party politician and cricketer. He was the MP for Dulwich from 1964 to 1983, and served as Attorney General for England and Wales from 1974 to 1979.

== Early life ==
Silkin was born in Neath in 1918, the second son of Lewis Silkin (afterwards Baron Silkin), a Labour Member of Parliament (MP) and a minister in Clement Attlee's Cabinet from 1945 to 1950. His younger brother, John, was also an MP and Cabinet minister. He was educated at Dulwich College and Trinity Hall, Cambridge. He played two games of first-class cricket in 1938, one each for Cambridge University Cricket Club and Glamorgan County Cricket Club.

== Career ==
He became a lawyer and was called to the bar in 1941. He received a commission in the British Army in December 1941.

On 18 March 1946, Silkin, with the military rank of lieutenant colonel, presided over the Double Tenth war crimes trials at the Supreme Court Building in Singapore. Twenty-one Japanese Kenpeitai were accused of torturing 57 internees, resulting in the deaths of 15. On 15 April 1946, after a hearing lasting 21 days, eight were sentenced to death by hanging. Three others received life imprisonment, one a sentence of fifteen years, and two were given prison terms of eight years. Seven were acquitted.

In 1963, Silkin was raised to the rank of Queen's Counsel. He chaired the Society of Labour Lawyers. He served as a councillor on Camberwell Borough Council from 1953 until 1959.

== Parliamentary career ==
At the 1964 general election, Silkin was elected Member of Parliament for the Dulwich constituency, adjoining his father's former constituency of Peckham. He was subsequently re-elected in Dulwich and continued to serve until his retirement at the 1983 general election.

From 1974 to 1979, he served as Attorney General for England and Wales and Northern Ireland under Labour Prime Ministers Harold Wilson and James Callaghan. After his retirement from politics, he was created a life peer as Baron Silkin of Dulwich, of North Leigh in the County of Oxfordshire, on 13 May 1985.

== Family ==
In 1941, Silkin married Elaine Stamp, with whom he had two sons and two daughters. His first wife died in 1984, and the following year, he married Sheila Marian.

Silkin died at Churchill Hospital in Oxford on 17 August 1988, at the age of 70.

Parliament of the United Kingdom
Preceded by Robert Jenkins	Member of Parliament for Dulwich; 1964–1983	Succeeded by Gerald Bowden
Political offices
Preceded by Peter Rawlinson	Attorney General for England and Wales; 1974–1979	Succeeded by Michael Havers
Preceded by Peter Rawlinson	Attorney General for Northern Ireland; 1974–1979	Succeeded by Michael Havers
