= Richard Balfe =

British politician and life peer (born 1944)

The Right Honourable The Lord Balfe
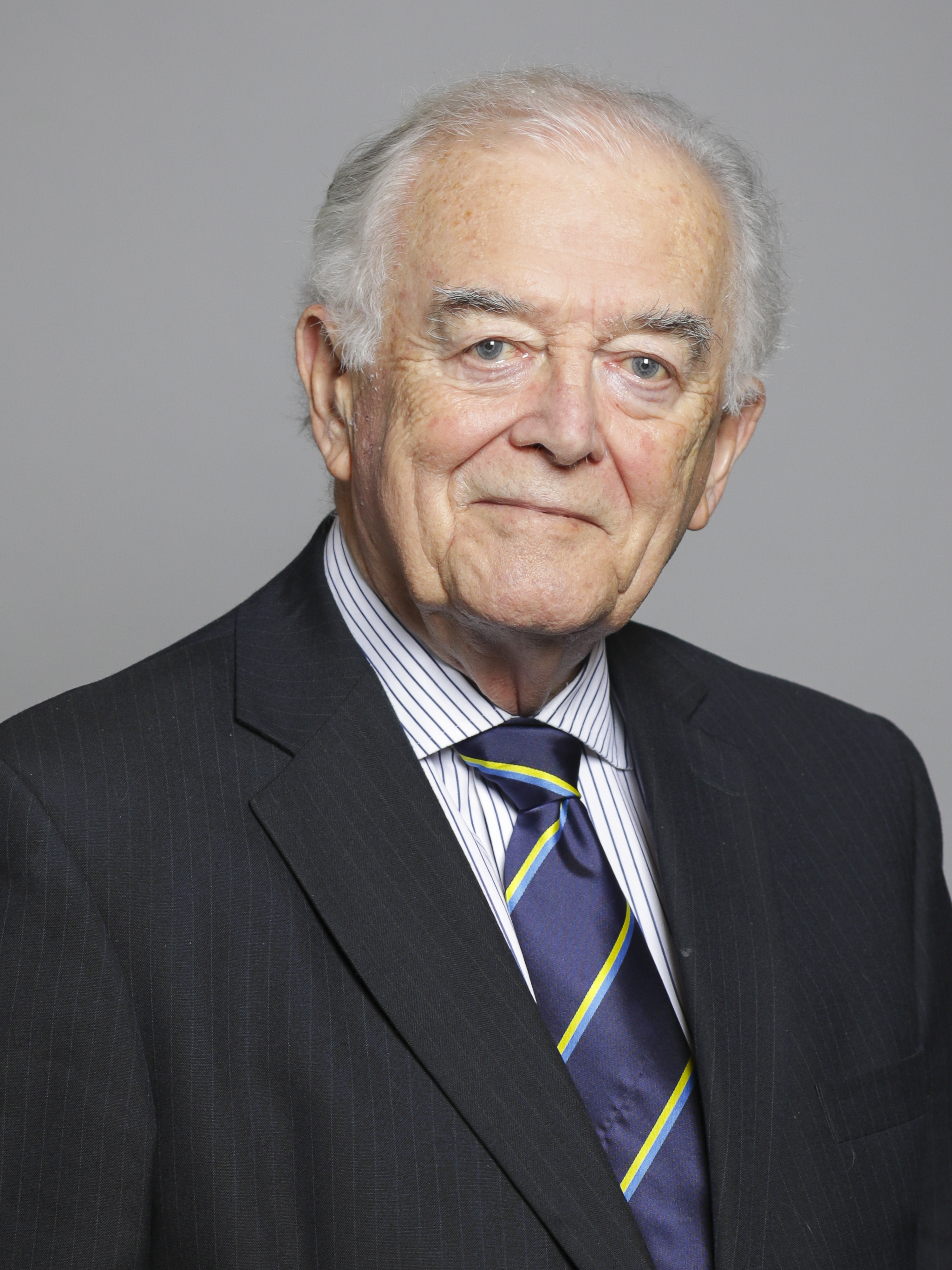
- Official portrait, 2019

Member of the House of Lords
- Lord Temporal
- Life peerage 19 September 2013

Member of the European Parliament for London London South Inner (1979–1999)
- In office 7 June 1979 – 10 June 2004
- Preceded by: Constituency established
- Succeeded by: Seat abolished

Personal details
- Born: Richard Andrew Balfe; 14 May 1944 (age 82) Barton Mills, Mildenhall, Suffolk
- Party: Conservative (since 2002)
- Other political affiliations: Labour (until 2002)
- Education: London School of Economics

Richard Andrew Balfe, Baron Balfe (born 14 May 1944) is a British politician and life peer. He was a Labour Party Member of the European Parliament (MEP) from 1979 but joined the Conservative Party in 2002, before standing down in 2004.

== Early life and career ==
Born in Barton Mills, Mildenhall, Suffolk, Balfe spent time in a children's home in Sheffield, and was educated at Brook Secondary School in the city. He began working in a bakery in 1960 and joined USDAW. The following year, he moved to London and worked first for the Crown Agents for Overseas Governments, then at the Foreign Office, before studying as a mature student at the London School of Economics, graduating BSc Hons. in 1971.

== Political career ==
In the 1970 general election, while a student, Balfe stood as the Labour Party candidate in Paddington South. He was unsuccessful, and instead became the Research Officer for the Finer Committee on One-Parent Families.

At the 1973 Greater London Council election, Balfe was elected as the member for Dulwich, serving until 1977. From 1975 until 1977 he was a member of the GLC Housing Committee. During this period, he was also political secretary (later director) of the Royal Arsenal Co-operative Society and chairman of the Thamesmead New Town Committee.

=== European Parliament ===
At the first direct elections to the European Parliament in 1979, Balfe was elected as the Member of the European Parliament (MEP) for London South Inner. He held his seat until its abolition in 1999, then won a seat from fourth place on the party list for London. He supported a single European currency and was a member of the European Movement.

In late 2001, Balfe stood for election to the post of quaestor in the European Parliament, against instructions from his party group. As a result, he was expelled in January 2002. In March, he joined the Conservative Party, the first elected Labour politician to do so since Reg Prentice in 1977.

Balfe stood down as an MEP in 2004. He then worked primarily as a Conservative campaigner in working-class areas of London, serving as Chair of Tottenham Conservative Association from 2005 to 2013, which he later described as a "hopeless cause". In 2008, he was appointed by David Cameron as the Conservatives' trade union envoy.

=== House of Lords ===
On 19 September 2013 he was created a life peer taking the title Baron Balfe, of Dulwich in the London Borough of Southwark. Balfe served as President of the Cambridge Conservative Association, the Honorary President of the British Dietetic Association and a member of the Advisory Board at the UK-based 'Polar Regions' think-tank Polar Research and Policy Initiative. Currently, he is President of the TUC affiliated Union BALPA (the British Airline Pilots Association).

On 4 June 2015, Balfe proposed "a bill to make provision to allow European Union citizens who are resident in the United Kingdom to vote in parliamentary elections and to become members of Parliament; and for connected purposes".

In line with his pro-EU views, in the run-up to the 2016 referendum Balfe took an active role in "Cambridge For Europe", a local campaign which cites as its purpose ensuring "that people in Cambridge and its wider region fully understand the arguments for continued membership of the European Union". In addition to being a member of the group's steering committee, he was also a patron. He is not associated with the Cambridge for Europe campaign that was relaunched in 2020, and which strongly advocates support for Ukraine's resistance to Russia's invasion.

On 22 June 2023, Balfe attended a party in London organised by Andrei Kelin, the Russian Ambassador to the United Kingdom on the occasion of Russia Day. Kelin gave a speech at the event in which he tried to justify his country's invasion of Ukraine.

Orders of precedence in the United Kingdom
Preceded by The Lord Haughey	Gentlemen; Baron Balfe	Followed by The Lord Allen of Kensington
