= Blakiston baronets of London (1763) =

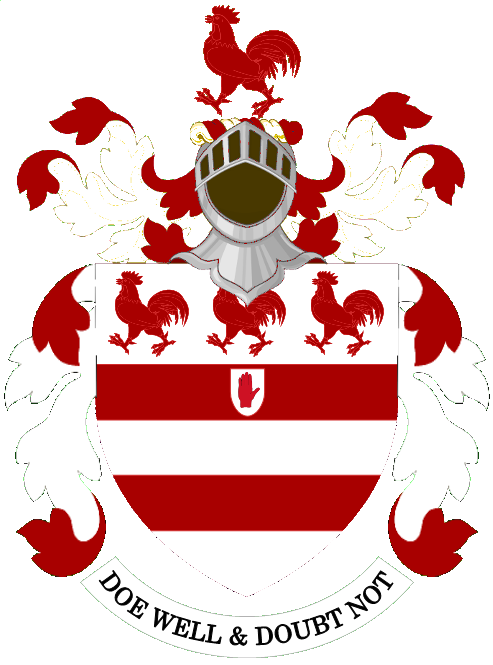
Coat of arms of the Blakiston baronets of London

The Blakiston baronetcy, of the City of London, was created in the Baronetage of Great Britain on 22 April 1763 for Matthew Blakiston, Lord Mayor of London from 1760 to 1761. (He was 3rd cousin of Sir Thomas Blakiston of Blakiston and 4th cousin of Sir Ralph Blakiston of Gibside.)

The title descended from father to son until the death of his great-grandson, the 4th Baronet, in 1883. He was unmarried and was succeeded by his nephew, Horace, the 5th Baronet. The latter died without issue in 1936 and was succeeded by his younger brother, Charles, the 6th Baronet. He also died childless and was succeeded by his nephew, Arthur, the 7th Baronet. He again was childless, and on his death in 1974 the title devolved on his second cousin, Norman, the 8th Baronet. He was the grandson of Charles Robert Blakiston, youngest son of the 3rd Baronet.

As of 2026 the title is held by the 8th Baronet's eldest son, Ferguson, the 9th Baronet, who succeeded in 1977.

== Blakiston baronets, of London (1763) ==
- Sir Matthew Blakiston, 1st Baronet (c. 1702–1774)
- Sir Matthew Blakiston, 2nd Baronet (1761–1806)
- Sir Matthew Blakiston, 3rd Baronet (1783–1862)
- Sir Matthew Blakiston, 4th Baronet (1811–1883)
- Sir Horace Nevile Blakiston, 5th Baronet (1861–1936)
- Sir Charles Edward Blakiston, 6th Baronet (1862–1941)
- Sir Arthur Frederick Blakiston, 7th Baronet (1892–1974)
- Sir (Arthur) Norman Hunter Blakiston, 8th Baronet (1899–1977)
- Sir Ferguson Arthur James Blakiston, 9th Baronet (born 1963)

The heir presumptive is the present holder's brother (Norman) John Balfour Blakiston (born 1964).

== Extended family ==
Thomas Blakiston, son of Major John Blakiston, second son of the 2nd Baronet, was an explorer and naturalist. John Blakiston-Houston, son of Richard Blakiston-Houston, younger son of the 2nd Baronet, was Member of Parliament for Down North. His third son Charles Blakiston-Houston was Member of the House of Commons of Northern Ireland for Belfast Dock from 1929 to 1933 while his fifth and youngest son John Blakiston-Houston (1882–1959) was a Major-General in the British Army. Rev. Herbert Edward Douglas Blakiston, grandson of Reverend Peyton Blakiston, youngest son of the 2nd Baronet, was President of Trinity College, Oxford, and Vice-Chancellor of Oxford University.

== Notes ==
Baronetage of Great Britain
Preceded by Smith baronets	Blakiston baronets of London; 22 April 1763	Succeeded by Fleming baronets
