= Sir Frederick Hall, 1st Baronet =

British politician (1864–1932)

Lieutenant-Colonel Sir Frederick Henry Hall, 1st Baronet, KBE, DSO (7 October 1864 – 28 April 1932) was a British businessman and politician. During World War I he was active in recruiting men for 'Kitchener's Army'.

== Early life ==
Hall was born on 7 October 1864, the son of Herbert William Hall, JP for Surrey. Frederick was educated privately and became a member of Lloyd's of London in 1896 and the Baltic Exchange in 1902. He was a member of the Committee of Lloyd's from 1921 to 1923. He was also a director of a number of companies, especially in the electricity supply industry.

== Political career ==
A personal friend of the politician Bonar Law, Hall succeeded him as Conservative Member of Parliament for Dulwich in the December, 1910 general election, and held the seat in succeeding elections until his death in 1932.

From 1907 to 1913 he was a member of London County Council for Dulwich, and was also a governor of Dulwich College Estates, a trustee of the Crystal Palace, and a magistrate in Surrey.

Of his service in parliament, the Times said: "he was known for his zeal in questioning ministers, and for his ingenuity in devising 'supplementaries'. He was a strong party man, and was accustomed to express his opinions with a vigour which sometimes aroused the anger of his opponents, though his genial personality made him genuinely popular."

== Military career ==
On the outbreak of World War I, Lord Kitchener issued his famous call to arms: 'Your King and Country Need You'. The flood of volunteers soon overwhelmed the ability of the Army to process them, and many units like the famous 'Pals Battalions' were raised under the auspices of mayors and corporations of towns up and down the country. On 14 January 1915 the War Office (WO) authorised Hall and the Mayor of Camberwell to recruit a brigade of four batteries of the Royal Field Artillery (RFA), to be numbered CLVI (156th), popularly known as the Camberwell Gun Brigade. Hall was commissioned as a Temporary Major on 5 February 1915 and promoted to Temporary Lieutenant-Colonel on 17 April. The local response was so prompt that in March another brigade was raised, numbered CLXII (162nd). The WO was then told that there were still enough would-be recruits in the Camberwell neighbourhood to raise the whole artillery for an infantry division. At once, authority was given to recruit the two remaining RFA brigades, CLXVI (166th) and CLXVII (167th) Howitzer Brigade, the 126th Heavy Battery of the Royal Garrison Artillery, and the Divisional Ammunition Column (a total of 17 batteries) for the 33rd Division composed of Pals Battalions such as the Public Schools Battalions and the Sportsmen's Battalions. Hall himself was the first commanding officer of CLVI Bde. All the men came from Camberwell and Dulwich, and the units were complete by 1 June.

33rd (Camberwell) Divisional Artillery embarked at Southampton for France on 12–13 December 1915 and fought on the Western Front for the rest of the war. As the units he had raised began to move into the line, Lt-Col Hall handed over command of CLVI Bde to a permanent officer and returned to Parliament. He was later awarded a Distinguished Service Order (DSO) and knighted (KBE) in the 1918 New Year Honours for his efforts.

After the war he was appointed (on 23 May 1923) Honorary Colonel of 53rd (City of London) Anti-Aircraft Brigade, Royal Artillery, a new Territorial Army unit that included a battery recruited from Lloyd's of London.

== Family life ==
Hall married in Annie Ellen, daughter of Dr Henry Hall of Plaistow, on 16 April 1892, and they had four children:

- Frederick Henry Hall (born 11 April 1899, died 22 June 1949), who succeeded to the baronetcy.
- Cecil Mortimer Hall (born 8 June 1908)
- Mildred Constance, who married firstly Horace Owen Whelan and secondly Henry Alexander Hewat
- Annie Elsie, who married Maurice Henry Drake

Sir Frederick Hall was created a baronet as Sir Frederick Hall of Grafham, Surrey on 5 March 1923.

Lady Hall died on 19 February 1929. Sir Frederick died at Hyde Park Gardens on 28 April 1932 and was buried at West Norwood Cemetery.

== Notes ==
Parliament of the United Kingdom
Preceded by Bonar Law	Member of Parliament for Dulwich; Dec. 1910 – 1932	Succeeded by Sir Bracewell Smith
Baronetage of the United Kingdom
New creation	Baronet (of Grafham, Surrey); 1923–1932	Succeeded by Frederick Henry Hall
