= Gerald Bowden =

British politician (1935–2020)

Member of Parliament for Dulwich
- In office 9 June 1983 – 16 March 1992
- Preceded by: Samuel Silkin
- Succeeded by: Tessa Jowell

Personal details
- Born: 26 August 1935
- Died: 7 January 2020 (aged 84)
- Party: Conservative
- Education: Magdalen College, Oxford

Gerald Francis Bowden (26 August 1935 – 7 January 2020) was a British Conservative MP, who represented Dulwich from 1983 until 1992. He was defeated by future Labour cabinet minister Tessa Jowell in the 1992 general election.

== Career ==
He graduated in Jurisprudence from Magdalen College, Oxford. He was called to the bar at Gray's Inn and qualified as a chartered surveyor at the College of Estate Management, practising part-time in these professions. Commissioned during National Service, he continued to serve in the Territorial Army, retiring in the rank of Lieutenant Colonel. He was also a principal lecturer in the law of property at London South Bank University (formerly South Bank Polytechnic) from 1971 to 1984.

Bowden represented Dulwich on the Greater London Council from 1977 to 1981.

He was MP for Dulwich from 1983 until 1992. On leaving Parliament he took up an academic appointment at Kingston University and resumed practice at the planning bar.

He was a trustee of the Royal Albert Hall, and was previously Chairman of the Dulwich Estate (Alleyn's College of God's Gift) and the Walcot Foundation, a trustee of the Magdalen College Development Trust, and the Oxford and Cambridge Club.

== Personal life ==
Bowden's daughter Emma died when the seaplane she was travelling in crashed into Cowan Creek, north of Sydney, Australia, on New Year's Eve, 2017. Emma was killed along with her fiancé Richard Cousins, her daughter, and Cousins's two sons.

== Sources ==
- Times Guide to the House of Commons 1992
- Hansard
- Who's Who

Parliament of the United Kingdom
Preceded by Samuel Silkin	Member of Parliament for Dulwich; 1983–1992	Succeeded by Tessa Jowell
