= Richard Barry O'Brien =

Richard Barry O'Brien (7 March 1847 – 17 March 1918) was a lawyer, historian, Irish journalist and prolific writer on Irish subjects.

He was born at Kilrush, County Clare. He studied law at the Catholic University, Dublin, after which he went to London. He was a founder-member there of the Irish Literary Society and also joined the London Gaelic League. He became political secretary to Patrick McMahon, a role which introduced him to senior British and Irish politicians.

He was loyal to, but not uncritical of, Charles Stuart Parnell, leader of the Irish Parliamentary Party at Westminster. Parnell wished to make him an MP, but he declined, as he preferred to remain focused on writing. He wrote a much-discussed biography of Parnell in 1898. O'Brien was a political insider and a committed Home Ruler and the biography throws light on the activities of Home Rule MPs and their links to the Fenian Movement.

He supported involvement in the First World War, where three of his sons fought.

He died in London and was buried in Glasnevin Cemetery, Dublin.

== Select works ==
- The Irish Land Question and English Public Opinion (1879)
- Fifty Years of Irish History (2 vols., 1883–85)
- Fifty Years of Concessions to Ireland (1883)
- Biography of Parnell (1898)
- Thomas Drummond: life and letters (1899)
- The Life of Lord Russell of Killowen (London, 1902)
- A Hundred Years of Irish History (1902)
- England's Claim to Ireland (1905)
- Fontenoy (1907)
- Dublin Castle and the Irish People (1909)
- The autobiography of Theobald Wolfe Tone, 1763-1798 (Ed., 1910)
- John Bright, a Monograph, with a preface by Augustine Birrell (London, 1910)
- The Home-Ruler's Manual
- Parliamentary History of the Irish Land Question
- Irish Memories (1918)
