= Smith baronets of Kidderminster (1920) =

Escutcheon of the Smith baronets of Kidderminster

The Smith baronetcy of Kidderminster, Worcestershire, was created on 30 June 1920 in the Baronetage of the United Kingdom for Herbert Smith. An industrialist, he chaired the wartime Board of Control of Wool and Textile Industries.

== Smith baronets, of Kidderminster (1920) ==
- Sir Herbert Smith, 1st Baronet (1872–1943)
- Sir Herbert Smith, 2nd Baronet (1903–1961), company director. The baronetcy became extinct on his death without a male heir.
