= John Morgan Howard =

British judge and Conservative Party politician

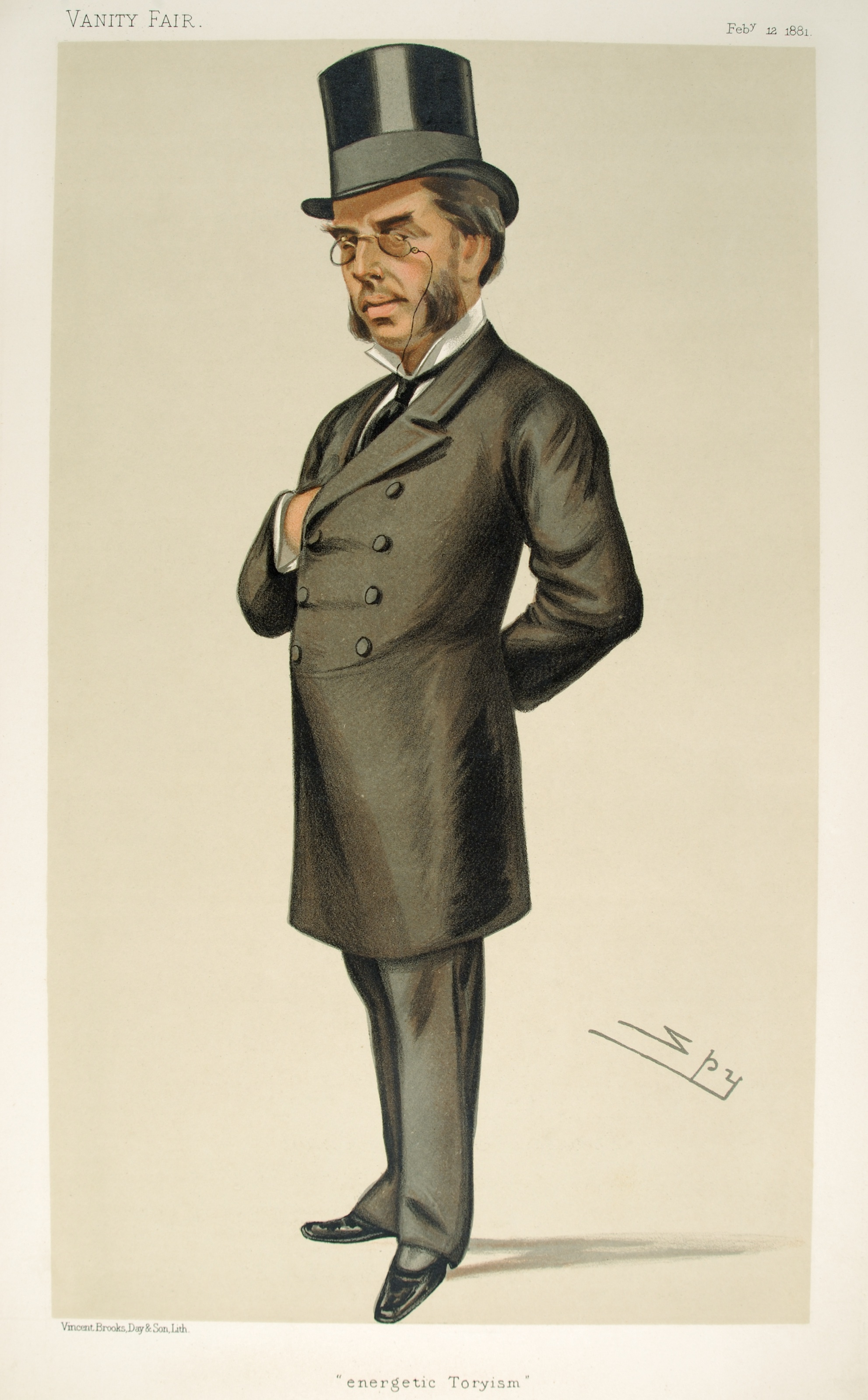
Caricature by Spy published in Vanity Fair in 1881.

John Morgan Howard (circa. 1832 – 10 April 1891) was a British judge and Conservative Party politician.

He was called to the bar in 1858, became a QC in 1874 and contested the Lambeth constituency in 1868, 1874 and 1880. In 1875 he was appointed Recorder of Guildford, and was finally elected Member of Parliament for Dulwich in the 1885 general election. He resigned from parliament in 1887 on being appointed Judge in the County Court circuit in Cornwall.

He married Ann Bowes (1827– ), daughter of George and Susanna Bowes, on 24 February 1857 at St Philip's Church, Dalston, London. They had one daughter, Ellen Theresa Howard (b. 1858, Islington, London). He died in Torquay on 10 April 1891.

Parliament of the United Kingdom
| New constituency | Member of Parliament for Dulwich; 1885 – 1887 | Succeeded by Sir John Blundell Maple |
