= Smith baronets of Edmondthorpe (1661) =

Escutcheon of the Smith baronets of Edmondthorpe

The Smith baronetcy, of Edmondthorpe (Edmundthorpe) in Leicestershire, was created on 20 March 1661 in the Baronetage of England for Edward Smith. He represented Leicestershire in the 1653 Barbon's Parliament.

== Smith baronets, of Edmondthorpe (1661) ==
- Sir Edward Smith, 1st Baronet (c.1630–1707), High Sheriff of Leicestershire, 1665.
- Sir Edward Smith, 2nd Baronet (c.1655–1721). The baronetcy was extinct on his death.
