= Sir Herbert Smith, 1st Baronet =

English carpet manufacturer

Sir Herbert Smith Bt
- Born: 22 June 1872
- Died: 14 July 1943 (aged 71)
- Occupation: Carpet manufacturer

Sir Herbert Smith, 1st Baronet (22 June 1872 – 14 July 1943), known as "Piggy" Smith, was an English carpet manufacturer.

Smith's business was based in Kidderminster. During the First World War he was chairman of the Carpet Trade Rationing Committee and the Man-Power and Protection Committee and was a member of the Board of Control of the Wool and Textile Industries. For these services he was created a baronet in the 1920 Birthday Honours.

From 1921 to 1938 he owned and lived at Witley Court, which partly burned down in 1937 and was never restored. He died at the age of 71 and was succeeded in the baronetcy by his son, also called Herbert.

== See also ==
- Smith of Kidderminster baronets

== Footnotes ==
Baronetage of the United Kingdom
New creation	Baronet (of Kidderminster); 1920–1943	Succeeded by Herbert Smith
