= Smith baronets of Long Ashton (second creation, 1763) =

Escutcheon of the Smith baronets of Long Ashton

The Smith baronetcy of Long Ashton, Somerset was created on 27 January 1763 for Jarrit Smyth, in the Baronetage of Great Britain. He was an attorney in Bristol, landowner and member of the Steadfast Society; and was Member of Parliament for Bristol from 1756 to 1768. The 1st Baronet was succeeded by his son and subsequently by two nephews.

== Smith (or Smyth) baronets of Long Ashton, Somerset (1763) ==
- Sir Jarrit Smith, 1st Baronet (c.1691–1783)
- Sir John Hugh Smith, 2nd Baronet (c.1735–1802)
- Sir Hugh Smyth, 3rd Baronet (1772–1824)
- Sir John Smyth, 4th Baronet (1776–1849). Absent male issue, the baronetcy became extinct in 1849.

There had been a previous 1661 baronetcy: Jarrit Smyth married Florence Smith, daughter and heiress of the 3rd Baronet of that creation. The family estates at Ashton Court and in Bristol and Gloucestershire passed in 1849 to Florence Smith, sister of the 3rd and 4th Baronets. She had married John Upton; and on her death in 1852 the estates passed to her grandson John Henry Greville Upton, for whom the baronetcy was recreated in 1859 as Smyth of Ashton Court.

== Notes ==
Baronetage of Great Britain
Preceded by Lloyd baronets	Smith baronets of Long Ashton; 27 January 1763	Succeeded by Blakiston baronets
