= David Williamson (British politician) =

British politician (1868–1955)

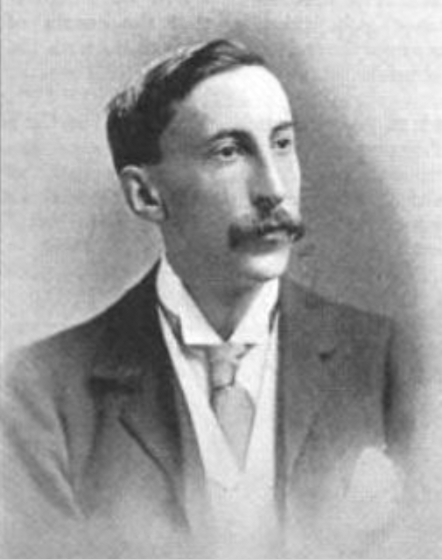
In The Sketch, 20 November 1895

David Williamson (16 November 1868 – 30 March 1955) was a British editor and politician.

== Electoral record ==
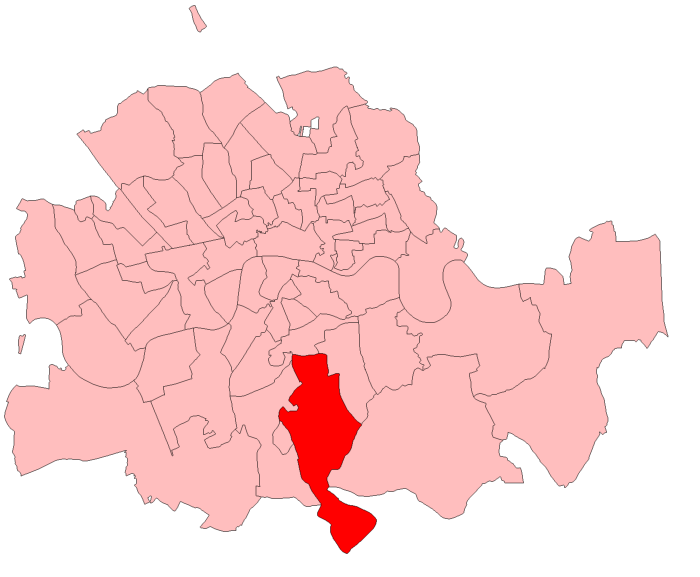
Dulwich in London 1906

General Election 1906: Dulwich
Party	Candidate	Votes	%	±%
Conservative	Frederick Rutherfoord Harris	6,639	51.4	−5.6
Liberal	David Williamson	6,282	48.6	+5.6
Majority		357	2.8	−11.2
Turnout		12,921	84.5	+9.0
Registered electors		15,286		
Conservative hold		Swing	-5.6	

1906 Dulwich by-election
Party	Candidate	Votes	%	±%
Conservative	Bonar Law	6,709	55.3	+3.9
Liberal	David Williamson	5,430	44.7	−3.9
Majority		1,279	10.6	+7.8
Turnout		12,139	79.4	−5.1
Registered electors		15,286		
Conservative hold		Swing	+3.9	
