= Sir Edward Smith, 1st Baronet =

English landowner and politician

Sir Edward Smith, 1st Baronet (c. 1630 – 6 September 1707) was an English landowner and politician who sat in the House of Commons in 1653.

Smith was the son of Edward Smith of Cressy Hall, Lincolnshire, and his wife Elizabeth Heron, daughter of Sir Edward Heron. His father died in 1632. He was admitted to Lincoln's Inn on 8 February 1649. In 1653, he was elected Member of Parliament for Leicestershire for the Barebones Parliament. He succeeded to the family estates of Edmondthorpe in 1655 on the death of his grandfather Sir Roger Smith. He was created a baronet on 16 August 1660. In 1666, he was High Sheriff of Leicestershire.

Smith married firstly Constance Spencer, daughter of Sir William Spencer, 2nd Baronet of Yarnton, Oxfordshire. He married secondly by licence dated 4 May 1682 Frances Lady Weston, widow of Sir Richard Weston and daughter of Sir George Marwood, 1st Baronet. His third wife was Bridget Baylis, widow of Richard Baylis of Woodford, Essex. He was succeeded in the baronetcy by his son Edward.

== See also ==
- Erasmus Smith

Parliament of England
Preceded by Sir Arthur Hesilrige; Henry Smith	Member of Parliament for Leicestershire; 1653; With: Henry Danvers; John Prat	Succeeded by Thomas Beaumont; Henry Grey, 1st Earl of Stamford; Lord Grey of Groby; Thomas Pochin
Baronetage of England
New creation	Baronet (of Edmondthorpe); 1660–1707	Succeeded by Edward Smith
