= Robert Jenkins (British politician) =

British politician

Robert Christmas Dewar Jenkins

Member of Parliament for Dulwich
- In office 1951–1964
- Preceded by: Wilfrid Vernon

Mayor of Kensington
- In office 1939–1945

Personal details
- Born: 29 September 1900
- Died: 25 June 1978 (aged 77)
- Party: Conservative
- Education: Latymer Upper School

Military service
- Allegiance: United Kingdom
- Branch/service: British Army
- Battles/wars: First World War

Robert Christmas Dewar Jenkins (29 September 1900 – 25 June 1978) was a British Conservative Party politician, and a Member of Parliament for 13 years.

The son of J Hamilton Jenkins, he was educated at Latymer Upper School.

During the First World War he served in the Inns of Court Officers' Training Corps and the King's Royal Rifle Corps.

In 1927 he was elected to Kensington Borough Council, remaining a member of the council until its abolition in 1965. He was mayor of Kensington from 1939–45 and leader of the Conservative group of the council from 1945–53, being appointed an alderman in 1947. When the successor Royal Borough of Kensington and Chelsea was formed in 1964, he was appointed an honorary alderman. He was appointed a justice of the peace for the County of London in 1946.

From 1934 - 1949 he was also a member of the London County Council, initially as a Municipal Reform Party councillor for Kensington South. In 1946 the Municipal Reformers, who had been the Conservative-backed party on the council, dissolved itself and he spent the final three years as a Conservative councillor.

At the 1950 general election, Jenkins stood as the Conservative candidate in the Dulwich constituency in South London, but lost by 1300 votes to the sitting Labour Party MP Wilfrid Vernon.

The next year, at the 1951 general election, he won the seat, with a majority of 691 over Vernon. Jenkins held the seat at the next two general elections, before retiring from the House of Commons at the 1964 general election.

Parliament of the United Kingdom
Preceded by Wilfrid Vernon	Member of Parliament for Dulwich; 1951–1964	Succeeded by Samuel Silkin
