= John Blundell Maple =

British politician (1845–1903)

Sir John Blundell Maple Bt
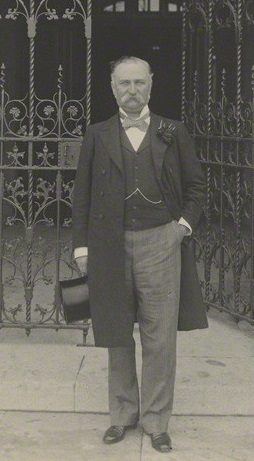

Member of Parliament for Dulwich
- In office 1887–1903
- Preceded by: John Morgan Howard
- Succeeded by: Frederick Rutherfoord Harris

Personal details
- Born: 1 March 1845
- Died: 24 November 1903 (aged 58)
- Spouse: Emily Harriet Merryweather
- Children: Grace Emily Blundell Maple

Sir John Blundell Maple, 1st Baronet (1 March 1845 – 24 November 1903) was an English business magnate who owned the furniture maker Maple & Co.

== Biography ==
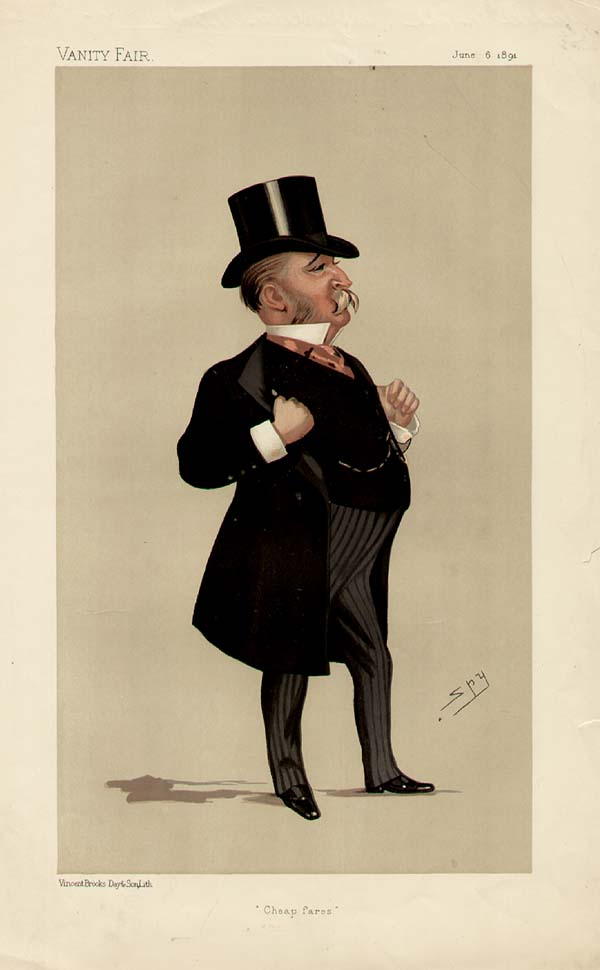
"Cheap fares". Caricature by Spy published in Vanity Fair in 1891

His father, John Maple (28 February 1815 – 4 March 1900), had a small furniture shop in Tottenham Court Road, London, and his business began to develop about the time that his son entered it. John Jr. was educated at King's College London. He soon took over the practical management of the company, and expanded it considerably. The firm became a limited liability company with a capital of two million pounds in 1890, with Maple as chairman.

He entered Parliament as Conservative member for Dulwich in 1887, serving until his death in 1903, was knighted in 1892, and was made a baronet on 30 August 1897. He was the developer of the Great Central Hotel at Marylebone station, which opened in 1899.

In Parliament, he sponsored bills in 1891 and 1893 to encourage cheaper train fares for working men, which would have favoured the many clerks in his constituency who commuted to the City.

He was the owner of Childwickbury Stud, a large Thoroughbred Horse breeding operation built on his estate. Appearing at first under the name of "Mr. Childwick," from 1885 onwards he won many important races including two of the British Classics.

His public benefactions included a hospital and a recreation ground to the city of St Albans, near which his residence, Childwickbury Manor, was situated, and the rebuilding, at a cost of more than £150,000, of University College Hospital, London.

Sir John Maple left a fortune of £2,153,000 at his death in 1903.

== Immediate family ==
Maple married Emily Harriet Merryweather, and the couple had one surviving daughter, Grace Emily (1876–1950). She was married twice and had four children, each by a different father.

In 1896, Grace married Baron Hermann von Eckardstein, who was First Secretary of the German Embassy in 1898 and later Ambassador to the Court of St James. They had one child together, Kathleen "Kit" (b. 1899).

In 1906, Grace had a child, Reginald Benwell, by another man, Dr. C. J. Williams; this child was adopted out secretly because Grace was still married to von Eckardstein. The date of their divorce is unknown.

On 16 August 1910, in Metheringham parish church, Lincolnshire, Grace, still known as "Baroness von Eckardstein", married William Ernest George Archibald Weigall, an MP and later governor of South Australia and a baronet. Six months into the marriage, Grace gave birth to her third child, Heather Campbell (b. March 1911). She was adopted out secretly because her father was Elidor Campbell, son of the 3rd Earl Cawdor, a fact Heather did not discover until very late in her own life. Heather married New Zealand artist Arthur Gordon Tovey and later published a memoir about trying to discover her parentage, Searching for Grace (2010). In 1914, Grace bore her husband a daughter, Priscilla Crystal Frances Blundell Weigall.

The Weigalls lived in a country house called Petwood at Woodhall Spa, Lincolnshire. Petwood is so called because Lady Weigall had it constructed of her favourite wood, her "pet wood". Lady Weigall turned her former home into a hotel in 1933 when the Weigalls moved to Ascot. Petwood was requisitioned by the RAF during World War II. Towards the end of the war it was used as the Officers' Mess for the famous Dambusters 617 Squadron, which was then based at nearby RAF Woodhall Spa. Inside the hotel, the Squadron bar is dedicated to the brave men of 617 Squadron and has memorabilia from that period.

=== Other descendants ===
Grace's granddaughter, Priscilla Weigall, was first wife (1935–1943) of the 6th Earl Howe (1908–1984) by whom she had two daughters. One of Sir John's great-great-grandsons is actor Jake Weber.

== Arms ==
Coat of arms of John Blundell Maple
Crest A squirrel sejant Or holding in the dexter paw a sprig of five maple leaves slipped Proper and resting the sinister on an escutcheon Azure charged with a bee volant Or. Escutcheon Or, on a chevron Azure between two horses' heads erased in chief Sable and a mount Vert in base thereon a maple tree Proper, a rose between two fleur-de-lis of the first. Motto Vi Et Prudentia (With Strength And Prudence)

== Notes ==
Parliament of the United Kingdom
Preceded by John Morgan Howard	Member of Parliament for Dulwich; 1887–1903	Succeeded by Frederick Rutherfoord Harris
Baronetage of the United Kingdom
New creation	Baronet (of Childwick Bury); 1897–1903	Extinct
Preceded by Reid baronets	Maple baronets of Childwick Bury; 30 August 1897	Succeeded by Gamble baronets
