= Irish Literary Society =

The Irish Literary Society was founded in London in 1892 by William Butler Yeats, T. W. Rolleston, and Charles Gavan Duffy. Members of the Southwark Irish Literary Club met in Clapham Reform Club and changed the name early in the year. On 13 February they met again to form a committee. Evelyn Gleeson became secretary. Stopford Brooke gave the inaugural lecture to the society, on 'The Need and Use of Getting Irish Literature into the English Tongue' (Bloomsbury House, 11 March 1893).

The Society developed a proposal for a New Irish Library, a series of books to honor Irish culture, with Rolleston and Douglas Hyde as editors. Limerick man Michael MacDonagh, author and Parliamentary correspondent for the Times, was an active member and editor of the Society's quarterly Gazette.

A Book of Irish Verse, designed to publicise the new societies, was published in 1895, edited by Yeats and dedicated 'To the Members of the National Literary Society of Dublin and the Irish Literary Society of London.' It featured poetry by Rolleston, Hyde, Katharine Tynan, Lionel Johnson, AE and several others, with notes and an introduction by himself.

Arthur Conan Doyle, of Irish descent, and with a keen interest in Ireland, chaired the Irish Literary Society's dinner on 13 February 1897. He spoke on 'The Irish Brigade'.

== Notable members ==
- D. P. Moran
- Ethel Rolt Wheeler (committee member)
- William Gibson, 2nd Baron Ashbourne (vice-president)
- David James O'Donoghue
- C. R. Cooke-Taylor (honorary secretary)
- Stephen Gwynn (secretary)
- Edmund Downey
- Michael MacDonagh (1862–1946)
- Peter Berresford Ellis
- Charles Russell, first Baron Russell of Killowen (vice-president)
- Richard Barry O'Brien (founder-member, chairman for twelve years and president for another six)
- John O'Connor Power
- Joseph R. Fisher, newspaper editor and Unionist representative on the Irish Boundary Commission
- Alfred Perceval Graves (president)
- Eleanor Hull (president)
- Laurence Ginnell
- Helen Waddell (vice-president)
- Mark F. Ryan
- Richard Ashe King (president 1925–1932)

== See also ==
- Irish Literary Revival
- National Literary Society
