= 1903 Dulwich by-election =

UK parliamentary by-election

← 1900	15 December 1903	1906 →

Candidate	Harris	Masterman
Party	Conservative	Liberal
Popular vote	5,819	4,382
Percentage	57.0%	43.0%
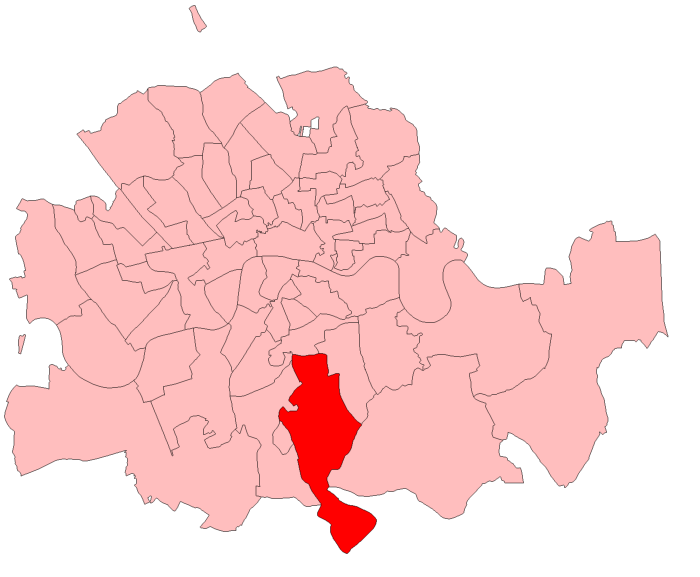
MP before election
Maple
Conservative
Subsequent MP
Harris
Conservative

The 1903 Dulwich by-election was a by-election held on 15 December 1903 for the British House of Commons constituency of Dulwich in South London.

== Vacancy ==
The by-election was triggered by the death of the serving Conservative Party Member of Parliament (MP), Sir John Blundell Maple.

== Candidates ==
- The Unionist (Conservative) candidate was Dr Frederick Rutherfoord Harris, who had previously been elected MP for Monmouth Boroughs in the 1900 general election but was disqualified the next year as a result of an election petition alleging irregularities.
- The Liberal Party candidate was Charles Masterman.

== Campaign ==
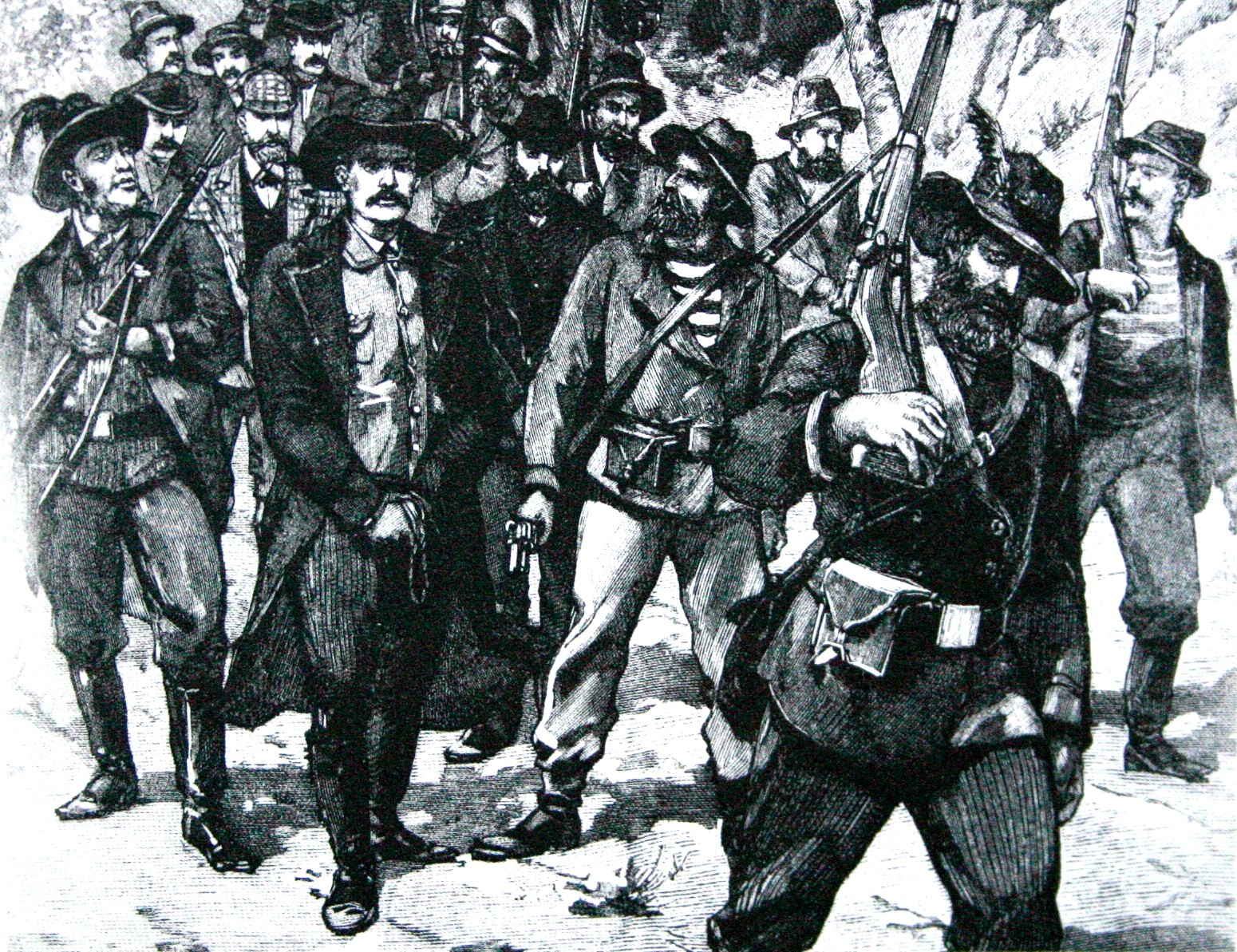
Arrest of Jameson after the raid - Petit Parisien 1896

The main issue in the by-election, as with the Lewisham by-election held on the same day, was tariff reform. Harris was a supporter of Joseph Chamberlain's proposals for Imperial Preference and was supported by the Tariff Reform League. Masterman was a supporter of the Liberal party policy of Free trade. Harris's involvement in the Jameson Raid affair was raised by his opponents.

== Result ==
Dulwich by-election, 1903
Party	Candidate	Votes	%	±%
Conservative	Frederick Rutherfoord Harris	5,819	57.0	N/A
Liberal	Charles Masterman	4,382	43.0	New
Majority		1,437	14.0	N/A
Turnout		10,201	75.5	N/A
Conservative hold		Swing	N/A	

== See also ==
- List of United Kingdom by-elections
- Dulwich constituency
