= London South Inner (European Parliament constituency) =

Former European Parliament constituency

- European Parliament constituency
- Boundary within London (1979-1984)
- Member state: United Kingdom
- Created: 1979
- Dissolved: 1999
- MEPs: 1

Prior to its uniform adoption of proportional representation in 1999, the United Kingdom used first-past-the-post for the European elections in England, Scotland and Wales. The European Parliament constituencies used under that system were smaller than the later regional constituencies and only had one Member of the European Parliament each. The constituency of London South Inner was one of them.

Boundary within South East England and London (1984-1994)

Boundary within South East England and London (1994-1999)

== Boundaries ==
1979-1984: Bermondsey; Dulwich; Greenwich; Lewisham Deptford; Lewisham East; Lewisham West; Norwood; Peckham; Streatham.

1984-1994: Dulwich; Lewisham Deptford; Lewisham East; Lewisham West; Norwood; Peckham; Southwark and Bermondsey; Streatham; Vauxhall.

1994-1999: Dulwich; Greenwich; Lewisham Deptford; Lewisham East; Lewisham West; Norwood; Peckham; Southwark and Bermondsey; Vauxhall.

== Members of the European Parliament ==
| Elected | Members | Party |
|---|---|---|
| 1979 | Richard Balfe | Labour Co-operative |
| 1984 | Richard Balfe | Labour Co-operative |
| 1989 | Richard Balfe | Labour Co-operative |
| 1994 | Richard Balfe | Labour Co-operative |
| 1999 | Constituency abolished: see London | |

== Election results ==
European Parliament election, 1979: London South Inner
| Party | Candidate | Votes | % | ±% |
|---|---|---|---|---|
| Labour | Richard Balfe | 67,830 | 48.8 | N/A |
| Conservative | J. V. Butterfill | 60,652 | 43.6 | N/A |
| Liberal | R. H. Insoll | 10,509 | 7.6 | N/A |
| Majority | | 7,178 | 5.2 | N/A |
| Turnout | | 138,991 | 27.3 | N/A |
| Labour win (new seat) | | | | |

European Parliament election, 1984: London South Inner
| Party | Candidate | Votes | % | ±% |
|---|---|---|---|---|
| Labour | Richard Balfe | 77,661 | 50.9 | ▲2.1 |
| Conservative | Mrs. Doreen Miller | 46,180 | 30.3 | ▼13.4 |
| SDP | Jim Daly | 25,391 | 16.6 | ▲9.1 |
| Ecology | Mrs. Janice Owens | 3,281 | 2.2 | N/A |
| Majority | | 31,481 | 20.6 | ▲15.5 |
| Turnout | | 152,513 | 28.7 | ▲1.4 |
| Labour hold | | Swing | ▲7.7 | |

European Parliament election, 1989: London South Inner
| Party | Candidate | Votes | % | ±% |
|---|---|---|---|---|
| Labour | Richard Balfe | 90,378 | 52.0 | ▲1.1 |
| Conservative | Robin J. P. Wheatley | 45,360 | 26.1 | ▼4.2 |
| Green | Miss Penny A. Shepherd | 26,230 | 15.1 | ▲12.9 |
| SLD | M. J. (John) Pindar | 10,277 | 5.9 | ▼10.7 |
| Communist | P. N. (Nigel) Power | 1,277 | 0.7 | N/A |
| Communist League | Mrs. D. Weppler | 323 | 0.2 | N/A |
| Majority | | 45,018 | 25.9 | ▲5.3 |
| Turnout | | 173,845 | 32.9 | ▲4.2 |
| Labour hold | | Swing | ▲2.6 | |

European Parliament election, 1994: London South Inner
| Party | Candidate | Votes | % | ±% |
|---|---|---|---|---|
| Labour | Richard Balfe | 85,079 | 61.0 | ▲9.0 |
| Conservative | Andrew Boff | 25,859 | 18.6 | ▼7.5 |
| Liberal Democrats | Adrian P. Graves | 20,708 | 14.9 | ▲8.9 |
| Green | W.S.B. (Shane) Collins | 6,570 | 4.7 | ▼10.4 |
| Natural Law | Mark C. Leighton | 1,179 | 0.8 | N/A |
| Majority | | 59,220 | 42.5 | ▲16.6 |
| Turnout | | 139,395 | 27.3 | ▼5.6 |
| Labour hold | | Swing | ▲8.3 | |
