= Dulwich (electoral division) =

Electoral division in Greater London, 1973–1986

- Former electoral division for the Greater London Council
- Dulwich electoral division boundaries
- District: Southwark
- Electorate: 68,617 (1973); 63,394 (1977); 61,857 (1981)
- Major settlements: Dulwich
- Area: 1,260 hectares (12.6 km^{2}) (1973); 1,315 hectares (13.15 km^{2}) (1977/1981)

Former electoral division
- Created: 1973
- Abolished: 1986
- Member: 1
- Created from: Southwark

Dulwich was an electoral division for the purposes of elections to the Greater London Council. The constituency elected one councillor for a four-year term in 1973, 1977 and 1981, with the final term extended for an extra year ahead of the abolition of the Greater London Council.

== History ==
It was planned to use the same boundaries as the Westminster Parliament constituencies for election of councillors to the Greater London Council (GLC), as had been the practice for elections to the predecessor London County Council, but those that existed in 1965 crossed the Greater London boundary. Until new constituencies could be settled, the 32 London boroughs were used as electoral areas. The London Borough of Southwark formed the Southwark electoral division. This was used for the Greater London Council elections in 1964, 1967 and 1970.

The new constituencies were settled following the Second Periodic Review of Westminster constituencies and the new electoral division matched the boundaries of the Dulwich parliamentary constituency.

It covered an area of 1,260 hectares (12.6 km^{2}) in 1973. Revisions to ward boundaries in the London Borough of Southwark changed the area of the division to 1,315 hectares (13.15 km^{2}) for the 1977 and 1981 elections.

== Elections ==
The Dulwich constituency was used for the Greater London Council elections in 1973, 1977 and 1981. One councillor was elected at each election using first-past-the-post voting.

=== 1973 election ===
The fourth election to the GLC (and first using revised boundaries) was held on 12 April 1973. The electorate was 68,617 and one Labour Party councillor was elected. The turnout was 38.9%. The councillor was elected for a three-year term. This was extended for an extra year in 1976 when the electoral cycle was switched to four-yearly.

1973 Greater London Council election: Dulwich
Party	Candidate	Votes	%	±%
Labour	Richard Andrew Balfe	14,184	53.18	
Conservative	A. P. Berend	9,222	34.56	
Liberal	C. M. Hall	2,853	10.70	
Communist	E. L. Hodson	431	1.61	
Turnout				
Labour win (new seat)				

=== 1977 election ===
The fifth election to the GLC (and second using revised boundaries) was held on 5 May 1977. The electorate was 63,394 and one Conservative Party councillor was elected. The turnout was 44.0%. The councillor was elected for a four-year term.

1977 Greater London Council election: Dulwich
Party	Candidate	Votes	%	±%
Conservative	Gerald Francis Bowden	12,729	45.81	
Labour	Richard Andrew Balfe	11,446	41.18	
Liberal	J. N. Hunt	1,695	6.10	
National Front	D. Thompson	1,272	4.58	
Communist	E. Hodson	353	1.27	
National Party	E. H. Arthurton	300	1.08	
Turnout				
Conservative gain from Labour		Swing		

Gerald Francis Bowden was elected MP for Dulwich in 1983.

=== 1981 election ===
The sixth and final election to the GLC (and third using revised boundaries) was held on 7 May 1981. The electorate was 61,857 and one Labour Party councillor was elected. The turnout was 45.2%. The councillor was elected for a four-year term, extended by an extra year by the Local Government (Interim Provisions) Act 1984, ahead of the abolition of the council.

1981 Greater London Council election: Dulwich
Party	Candidate	Votes	%	±%
Labour	Lesley Hammond	13,039	46.70	
Conservative	Gerald Francis Bowden	10,041	35.97	
Liberal	Jonathan Nigel Hunt	3,526	12.63	
National Front	Patrick McConnell	684	2.45	
Ecology	David A Smart	525	1.88	
Abolish the GLC	William E S Newton	110	0.39	
Turnout				
Labour gain from Conservative		Swing		
