= C. R. Cooke-Taylor =

British politician and psychiatrist

Charles Ralph Cooke-Taylor
- Born: Charles Ralph Cooke-Taylor; 24 August 1883
- Died: 24 May 1939 (aged 55); London, England
- Occupation(s): Psychiatrist and politician

Charles Ralph Cooke-Taylor, OBE (24 August 1883 – 24 May 1939) was a British psychiatrist and politician. He belonged to the Liberal Party and ran for public office several times.

== Biography ==
Born in 1883, C. R. Cooke-Taylor was the son of author and factory inspector Whateley Cooke-Taylor and the grandson of the author William Cooke Taylor; both known for their writings on the factory system. He was educated at Fettes College, and later at the University of Oxford where he studied law. He also studied at the Sorbonne in Paris and in Germany.

Cooke-Taylor was called to the Bar in 1910 but later studied medicine and became a specialist in nervous diseases. During the First World War, he joined a medical unit in Serbia and was awarded the Serbian Cross of Charity by the King of Serbia. Captured by the Bulgarians, he spent some time in captivity before returning to England where he worked with refugees. Having obtained a Diploma in Psychological Medicine, he worked at the Ex-Servicemen's Welfare Hospital in Beckenham, The British Hospital for Mental Disorders and Brain Diseases in Camden Town, and the Maudsley Hospital.

In 1910 Cooke-Taylor contested Holborn as a candidate of the Liberal Party. Between 1918 and 1935 he contested the Dulwich seat eight times, though he never won. In 1937 the Dulwich branch gave him a dinner to celebrate 25 years of service to the constituency. He was an active member of Liberal Party organisations and the British Legion and for a long time was honorary secretary of the Irish Literary Society. In 1937 he was awarded the OBE.

Cooke-Taylor died at University College Hospital, London. He was unmarried. The Times wrote of him that "he will live in the memory of humble folk whose lives he shaped and whose love he gained".

== Bibliography ==
- "Dr. Cooke-Taylor: The Liberal Tradition", The Times, Saturday, 27 May 1939
