= Frederick Rutherfoord Harris =

British politician

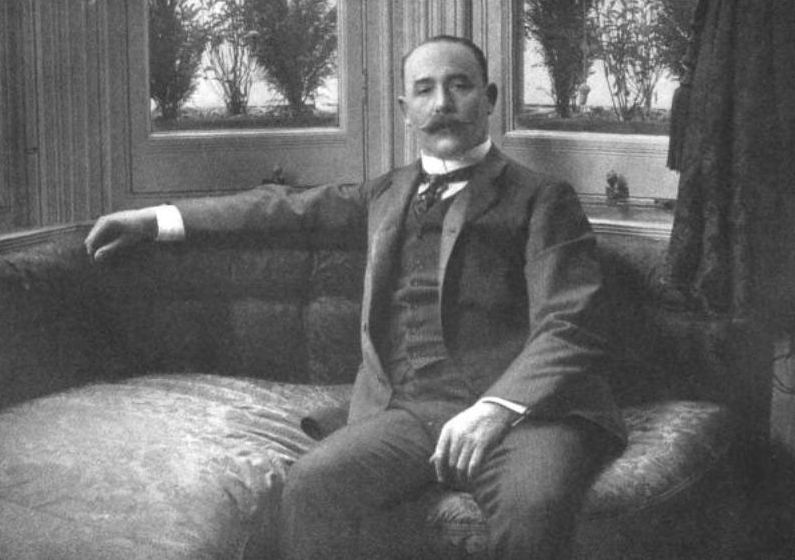
Harris photographed by E. H. Mills

Frederick Rutherfoord Harris (1 May 1856 – 2 September 1920) was a British Conservative Party politician who served as a member of parliament (MP) between 1900 and 1906.

== Biography ==
Harris was born in Madras, India, where his father, George Anstruther Harris, was a Supreme Court Judge, and was educated at Leatherhead Grammar School, in Baden, and at the University of Edinburgh, where he studied medicine.

In 1882 he began practising as a doctor in Kimberley, South Africa. He got to know Cecil Rhodes, who appointed him secretary of the British South Africa Company when it was set up. He became a member of the Cape Province House of Assembly, sitting for the Kimberley constituency. In 1895 he was involved in the controversy over the Jameson Raid, when on Rhodes' instructions he forwarded to The Times newspaper a message from the Reform Committee dated in such a way as to falsely suggest that Jameson was responding to an immediate request for help. "The cloud of this act of deception," The Times later wrote, "was heavy over Harris for the rest of his life".

Moving to England, he was first elected as MP for Monmouth Boroughs in the 1900 general election, winning the seat from the Liberal party, but was unseated after a lawsuit alleging electoral irregularities. Although he was disqualified by the court from standing again in the constituency for seven years, the judges insisted that no blame should attach to Harris personally. A local committee subsequently raised nearly a thousand pounds for a gift on his behalf.

He was elected MP for Dulwich at a by-election in 1903, but sat for only three years before resigning to return to South Africa. He died in Eastbourne on 2 September 1920 at the age of 64.

He was a descendant of General George Harris, victor of the Battle of Seringapatam, and a cousin of Lord Harris, the cricketer. In 1884 at St.Cyprian's Church, Kimberley he married Florence Ling. She hanged herself three months after his death, apparently overcome by grief.

Parliament of the United Kingdom
Preceded by Albert Spicer	Member of Parliament for Monmouth Boroughs; 1900 – 1901	Succeeded by Joseph Lawrence
Preceded by John Blundell Maple	Member of Parliament for Dulwich; 1903 – 1906	Succeeded by Bonar Law
