= Smith baronets of Crowmallie (1945) =

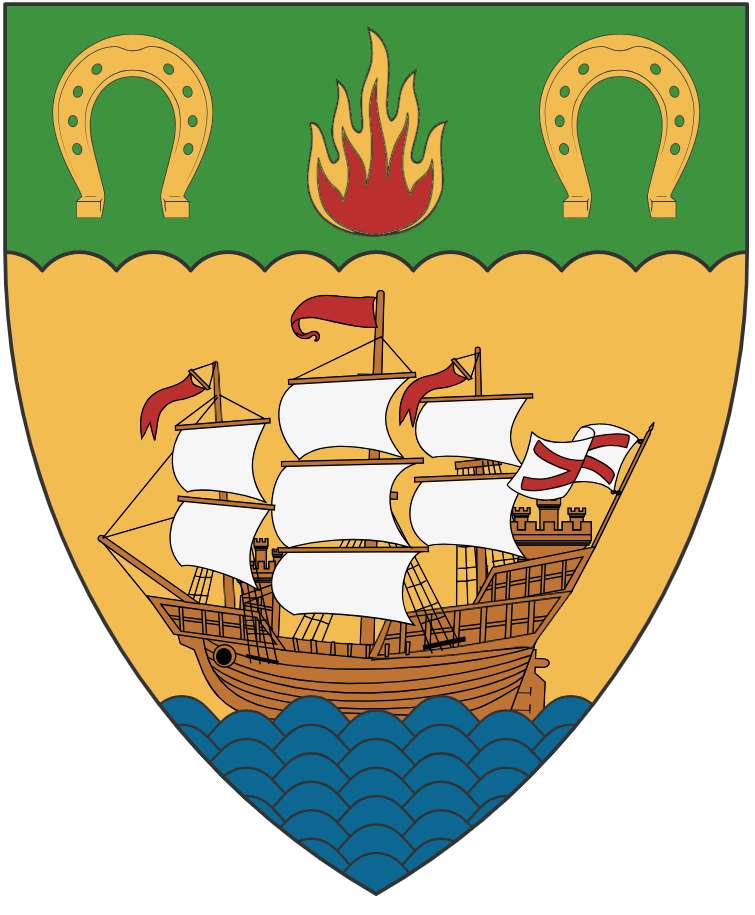
Coat of arms of Smith of Crowmallie

The Smith baronetcy of Crowmallie, Aberdeenshire, was created on 22 June 1945 in the Baronetage of the United Kingdom for the Conservative politician Robert Workman Smith. He was Member of Parliament for Aberdeen and Kincardine Central from 1924 to 1945.

== Smith of Crowmallie, Aberdeenshire (1945) ==
- Sir Robert Workman Smith, 1st Baronet (1880–1957)
- Sir William Gordon Smith, 2nd Baronet (1916–1983)
- Sir Robert Hill Smith, 3rd Baronet (born 1958)

The heir presumptive is the present holder's brother Charles Gordon Smith (born 1959).
