= Clive Carr =

Clive Carr is a former vice-president of Arsenal Football Club and a former hotelier.

He is the grandson of former Arsenal Chairman Sir Bracewell Smith, alongside his brother Richard, through their late mother Eileen. His father Harry Lascelles Carr played cricket for Glamorgan, served in the RAF in the Second World War and died in 1943.

Clive Carr married Isabel, daughter of Vicomte Devezeaux de Rancougne, in 1963. They have two children. They divorced in 1970. In 1970, he married Isabel, daughter of Thirlby and Ida Pearce. They have two children.

He became chairman and chief executive of the Park Lane Hotel in 1976 and remained so for twenty years until the hotel was sold in 1996 to Sheraton Hotels and Resorts.
