= Dulwich (UK Parliament constituency) =

Parliamentary constituency in the United Kingdom, 1885–1997

- Former borough constituency for the House of Commons
- Boundary of Dulwich in Greater London for the 1983 general election
- County: Greater London

1885–1997
- Seats: One
- Created from: East Surrey (certainly as to bulk); Lambeth (possibly as to negligible parts)
- Replaced by: Dulwich and West Norwood (bulk); Camberwell and Peckham (part)

Dulwich was a borough constituency in the Dulwich area of South London, which returned one Member of Parliament (MP) to the House of Commons of the Parliament of the United Kingdom.

The constituency was created by the Redistribution of Seats Act 1885 for the 1885 general election. The constituency was abolished by the Boundary Commission in 1997, when most of its former territory became part of the Dulwich and West Norwood constituency.

== History ==
A map showing the wards of Camberwell Metropolitan Borough as they appeared in 1916.

The constituency of Dulwich was created by the Redistribution of Seats Act 1885, as one of nine covering the enlarged parliamentary former borough of Lambeth. Lambeth councillors had been overwhelmingly progressive Liberals though this part of the seat did have Conservative parish/urban district councillors before 1885. Dulwich was one of three seats in the new parliamentary borough of Camberwell.

As a suburban London constituency, Dulwich tended to favour the Conservatives, and returned a Conservative member in each election between 1885 and 1945, when it fell to the Labour party. After that it became a marginal seat, with Labour winning slightly more times than the Conservatives. In 1892 the Liberal candidate estimated that it had around 4,000 working class voters out of around 10,500 and observed that although it had a reputation as a 'villa constituency' there were many voters in the many less impressive houses.

The constituency shared boundaries with the Dulwich electoral division for election of councillors to the Greater London Council at elections in 1973, 1977 and 1981. Gerald Bowden held the seat from 1977 to 1981.

== Boundaries ==
Map of boundaries 1974–1983

Dates	Local authority	Maps	Wards
1885–1918	Metropolitan Borough of Camberwell		Camberwell and Dulwich, and the hamlet of Penge.
1918–1950	Metropolitan Borough of Camberwell		Alleyn, College, Hamlet, Ruskin, and St John's.
1950–1974	Metropolitan Borough of Camberwell (before 1965); London Borough of Southwark (after 1965)		Alleyn, College, Hamlet, Lyndhurst, Nunhead, Ruskin, Rye, Rye Lane, and St John's.
1974–1983	London Borough of Southwark		Alleyn, Bellenden, College, Lyndhurst, Ruskin, Rye, The Lane, and Waverley.
1983–1997	London Borough of Southwark		Alleyn, Bellenden, College, Lyndhurst, Ruskin, Rye, The Lane, and Waverley.

=== 1885–1918 ===
The constituency was formed predominantly from the existing constituency of East Surrey

=== 1918–1950 ===
Penge was transferred to the new seat of Bromley.

=== 1950–1974 ===
Nunhead, Rye and Rye Lane wards were transferred from Peckham. Lyndhurst was transferred from the abolished seat of Camberwell North West

=== 1974–1983 ===
Minor transfer from Peckham.

=== 1983–1997 ===
Minor transfer to Peckham.

== Members of Parliament ==
Election	Member	Party	Notes
1885	John Morgan Howard	Conservative	Resigned in 1887 following his appointment as a County Court circuit Judge
1887 by-election	Sir John Blundell Maple	Conservative	Died November 1903
1903 by-election	Frederick Rutherfoord Harris	Conservative	Resigned in 1906
1906 by-election	Bonar Law	Conservative	
1910	Sir Frederick Hall	Conservative	Died April 1932
1932 by-election	Sir Bracewell Smith	Conservative	
1945	Wilfrid Vernon	Labour	
1951	Robert Jenkins	Conservative	
1964	Samuel Silkin	Labour	Attorney General for England and Wales, and Northern Ireland (1974 – 1979)
1983	Gerald Bowden	Conservative	
1992	Tessa Jowell	Labour	Contested Dulwich & West Norwood following redistribution
1997	constituency abolished: see Dulwich & West Norwood		

== Elections ==
=== Elections in the 1990s ===
General election 1992: Dulwich
Party	Candidate	Votes	%	±%
Labour	Tessa Jowell	17,714	47.3	+5.3
Conservative	Gerald Bowden	15,658	41.8	−0.6
Liberal Democrats	Alex Goldie	4,078	10.9	−3.6
Majority		2,056	5.5	N/A
Turnout		37,450	67.9	−1.4
Registered electors		55,141		
Labour gain from Conservative		Swing	+3.0	

=== Elections in the 1980s ===
General election 1987: Dulwich
Party	Candidate	Votes	%	±%
Conservative	Gerald Bowden	16,563	42.4	+1.9
Labour	Kate Hoey	16,383	42.0	+6.3
SDP	Andrew Harris	5,664	14.5	−7.5
Green	Alex Goldie	432	1.1	+0.5
Majority		180	0.5	–4.4
Turnout		39,042	69.3	+2.1
Registered electors		56,355		
Conservative hold		Swing	–2.2	

General election 1983: Dulwich
Party	Candidate	Votes	%	±%
Conservative	Gerald Bowden	15,424	40.5	−2.8
Labour	Kate Hoey	13,565	35.7	−6.6
SDP	Dick Taverne	8,376	22.0	+10.9
National Front	Raymond Barker	338	0.9	−1.2
Ecology	R Baker	237	0.6	−0.5
Loony Society	Richard Vero	99	0.3	New
Majority		1,859	4.9	+3.8
Turnout		38,039	67.2	
Registered electors		56,596		
Conservative notional hold				

=== Elections in the 1970s ===
1979 notional result
Party	Vote	%
Conservative	17,821	43.4
Labour	17,371	42.3
Liberal	4,588	11.2
Others	1,323	3.2
Turnout	41,103	
Electorate		

General election 1979: Dulwich
Party	Candidate	Votes	%	±%
Labour	Samuel Silkin	18,557	43.0	−6.5
Conservative	Eric Morley	18,435	42.7	+10.2
Liberal	William Pearson	4,759	11.0	−6.9
National Front	David Thompson	920	2.1	New
Ecology	David Smart	468	1.1	New
Majority		122	0.3	−16.7
Turnout		43,139	70.4	+5.3
Registered electors		61,259		
Labour hold		Swing	–8.3	

General election October 1974: Dulwich
Party	Candidate	Votes	%	±%
Labour	Samuel Silkin	21,790	49.5	+4.1
Conservative	Eric Morley	14,331	32.6	−2.1
Liberal	William Pearson	7,866	17.9	−2.0
Majority		7,459	17.0	+6.2
Turnout		43,987	65.1	–8.8
Registered electors		67,542		
Labour hold		Swing	+3.1	

General election February 1974: Dulwich
Party	Candidate	Votes	%	±%
Labour	Samuel Silkin	22,530	45.5	−2.1
Conservative	Keith Raffan	17,189	34.7	−10.0
Liberal	William Pearson	9,851	19.9	+12.1
Majority		5,341	10.8	+7.9
Turnout		49,570	73.9	+10.9
Registered electors		67,059		
Labour hold		Swing	+3.9	

1970 notional result
Party	Vote	%
Labour	21,500	47.6
Conservative	20,200	44.7
Liberal	3,500	7.7
Turnout	45,200	63.0
Electorate	71,760	

General election 1970: Dulwich
Party	Candidate	Votes	%	±%
Labour	Samuel Silkin	20,145	47.2	−4.8
Conservative	Patrick Mayhew	19,250	45.1	+6.5
Liberal	Alfred Blackburn	3,301	7.7	−1.7
Majority		895	2.1	−11.3
Turnout		42,696	64.4	–9.3
Registered electors		66,265		
Labour hold		Swing	–5.6	

=== Elections in the 1960s ===
General election 1966: Dulwich
Party	Candidate	Votes	%	±%
Labour	Samuel Silkin	24,469	52.0	+5.1
Conservative	Martin Stevens	18,173	38.6	−2.2
Liberal	Michael Ridd	4,458	9.5	−2.4
Majority		6,296	13.4	+7.3
Turnout		47,100	73.7	–0.0
Registered electors		63,891		
Labour hold		Swing	+3.6	

General election 1964: Dulwich
Party	Candidate	Votes	%	±%
Labour	Samuel Silkin	22,320	46.9	+4.0
Conservative	Martin Stevens	19,415	40.8	−6.3
Liberal	Fred G Redman	5,627	11.8	+1.8
Christian Socialist	Frederick Palmer	264	0.6	New
Majority		2,905	6.1	N/A
Turnout		47,626	73.8	–5.4
Registered electors		64,568		
Labour gain from Conservative		Swing	+5.2	

=== Elections in the 1950s ===
General election 1959: Dulwich
Party	Candidate	Votes	%	±%
Conservative	Robert Jenkins	24,991	47.1	−1.3
Labour	A Leslie Hill	22,740	42.9	−2.0
Liberal	W John Searle	5,324	10.0	+3.3
Majority		2,251	4.2	+0.7
Turnout		53,055	79.2	+0.5
Registered electors		66,988		
Conservative hold		Swing	+0.4	

General election 1955: Dulwich
Party	Candidate	Votes	%	±%
Conservative	Robert Jenkins	25,333	48.4	+0.8
Labour	Wilfrid Vernon	23,482	44.9	−1.5
Liberal	David Phillips	3,501	6.7	+0.8
Majority		1,851	3.5	+2.3
Turnout		52,316	78.7	–5.2
Registered electors		66,495		
Conservative hold		Swing	+1.2	

General election 1951: Dulwich
Party	Candidate	Votes	%	±%
Conservative	Robert Jenkins	26,579	47.7	+3.4
Labour	Wilfrid Vernon	25,888	46.4	−0.3
Liberal	Paul Baker	3,302	5.9	−3.1
Majority		691	1.2	N/A
Turnout		55,769	83.9	+0.6
Registered electors		66,473		
Conservative gain from Labour		Swing	+1.8	

General election 1950: Dulwich
Party	Candidate	Votes	%
Labour	Wilfrid Vernon	25,511	46.7
Conservative	Robert Jenkins	24,186	44.3
Liberal	Paul Baker	4,929	9.0
Majority		1,325	2.4
Turnout		54,626	83.3
Registered electors		65,573	
Labour win (new boundaries)			

=== Elections in the 1940s ===
General election 1945: Dulwich
Party	Candidate	Votes	%	±%
Labour	Wilfrid Vernon	10,266	43.49	
Conservative	Bracewell Smith	10,055	42.59	
Liberal	John Ellis	3,287	13.92	
Majority		211	0.90	N/A
Turnout		23,608		
Registered electors				
Labour gain from Conservative		Swing		

=== Elections in the 1930s ===
The candidates selected for the aborted 1939–1940 general election were;

- Conservative: Bracewell Smith
- Liberal: C. R. Cooke-Taylor
- Labour: Wilfrid Vernon

General election 1935: Dulwich
Party	Candidate	Votes	%	±%
Conservative	Bracewell Smith	16,870	60.78	
Labour	James Vinor Delahaye	7,142	25.73	
Liberal	C. R. Cooke-Taylor	3,743	13.49	
Majority		9,728	35.05	
Turnout		27,755	65.76	
Registered electors				
Conservative hold		Swing		

1932 Dulwich by-election
Party	Candidate	Votes	%	±%
Conservative	Bracewell Smith	12,342	61.0	–10.6
Liberal	C. R. Cooke-Taylor	3,998	19.7	+6.8
Labour	Helen Bentwich	3,905	19.3	+3.7
Majority		8,344	41.3	–14.7
Turnout		20,245	43.0	–27.7
Registered electors				
Conservative hold		Swing		

General election 1931: Dulwich
Party	Candidate	Votes	%	±%
Conservative	Frederick Hall	21,752	71.6	+22.8
Labour	F. Hughes	4,747	15.6	–14.7
Liberal	C. R. Cooke-Taylor	3,924	12.9	–8.0
Majority		17,005	56.0	+37.5
Turnout		30,423	70.7	–1.4
Registered electors				
Conservative hold		Swing	+18.7	

=== Elections in the 1920s ===
General election 1929: Dulwich
Party	Candidate	Votes	%	±%
Unionist	Frederick Hall	15,009	48.8	−9.7
Labour	C. A. Smith	9,309	30.3	+3.8
Liberal	C. R. Cooke-Taylor	6,442	20.9	+5.9
Majority		5,700	18.5	−13.5
Turnout		30,760	72.1	−6.8
Registered electors		42,638		
Unionist hold		Swing	−6.8	

General election 29 October 1924: Dulwich
Party	Candidate	Votes	%	±%
Unionist	Frederick Hall	15,611	58.5	+5.1
Labour	C. A. Smith	7,068	26.5	New
Liberal	C. R. Cooke-Taylor	4,017	15.0	−31.6
Majority		8,543	32.0	+25.2
Turnout		26,696	78.9	+17.6
Registered electors		33,833		
Unionist hold		Swing	+18.4	

General election 6 December 1923: Dulwich
Party	Candidate	Votes	%	±%
Unionist	Frederick Hall	10,855	53.4	−14.2
Liberal	C. R. Cooke-Taylor	9,488	46.6	+14.2
Majority		1,367	6.8	−28.4
Turnout		20,343	61.3	−2.7
Registered electors		33,185		
Unionist hold		Swing	−14.2	

General election 15 November 1922: Dulwich
Party	Candidate	Votes	%	±%
Unionist	Frederick Hall	14,046	67.6	−11.3
Liberal	C. R. Cooke-Taylor	6,733	32.4	+11.3
Majority		7,313	35.2	−22.6
Turnout		20,779	64.0	+13.8
Registered electors		32,486		
Unionist hold		Swing	−11.3	

=== Elections in the 1910s ===
General election 14 December 1918: Dulwich
Party		Candidate	Votes	%
C	Unionist	Frederick Hall	12,039	78.9
	Liberal	C. R. Cooke-Taylor	3,219	21.1
Majority			8,820	57.8
Turnout			15,258	50.2
Registered electors			30,377	
	Unionist win (new boundaries)			
C indicates candidate endorsed by the coalition government.

General election December 1910: Dulwich
Party	Candidate	Votes	%	±%
Conservative	Frederick Hall	7,796	58.7	+0.4
Liberal	Evan Spicer	5,495	41.3	−0.4
Majority		2,301	17.4	+0.8
Turnout		13,291	80.7	−7.5
Registered electors		16,478		
Conservative hold		Swing	+0.4	

General election January 1910: Dulwich
Party	Candidate	Votes	%	±%
Conservative	Bonar Law	8,472	58.3	+6.9
Liberal	Evan Cotton	6,054	41.7	–6.9
Majority		2,418	16.6	+13.8
Turnout		14,526	88.2	+3.7
Registered electors		16,478		
Conservative hold		Swing	+6.9	

=== Elections in the 1900s ===
By-election, 1906: Dulwich
Party	Candidate	Votes	%	±%
Conservative	Bonar Law	6,709	55.3	+3.9
Liberal	David Williamson	5,430	44.7	−3.9
Majority		1,279	10.6	+6.8
Turnout		12,139	79.4	−5.1
Registered electors		15,286		
Conservative hold		Swing	+3.9	

General election 1906: Dulwich
Party	Candidate	Votes	%	±%
Conservative	Frederick Rutherfoord Harris	6,639	51.4	N/A
Liberal	David Williamson	6,282	48.6	N/A
Majority		357	2.8	N/A
Turnout		12,921	84.5	N/A
Registered electors		15,286		
Conservative hold		Swing	N/A	

1903 Dulwich by-election
Party	Candidate	Votes	%	±%
Conservative	Frederick Rutherfoord Harris	5,819	57.0	N/A
Liberal	Charles Masterman	4,382	43.0	New
Majority		1,437	14.0	N/A
Turnout		10,201	75.5	N/A
Registered electors		13,515		
Conservative hold		Swing	N/A	

General election 1900: Dulwich
Party	Candidate	Votes	%	±%
Conservative	John Blundell Maple	Unopposed		
Conservative hold				

=== Elections in the 1890s ===

1895 general election: Dulwich
Party	Candidate	Votes	%	±%
Conservative	John Blundell Maple	5,258	70.7	+7.8
Liberal	Charles Clarke	2,176	29.3	−7.8
Majority		3,082	41.4	+15.6
Turnout		7,434	62.2	−12.8
Registered electors		11,960		
Conservative hold		Swing	+7.8	

1892 general election: Dulwich
Party	Candidate	Votes	%	±%
Conservative	John Blundell Maple	5,318	62.9	N/A
Liberal	Arthur Clayden	3,138	37.1	N/A
Majority		2,180	25.8	N/A
Turnout		8,456	75.0	N/A
Registered electors		11,277		
Conservative hold		Swing	N/A	

=== Elections in the 1880s ===
By-election, 1 Dec 1887: Dulwich
Party	Candidate	Votes	%	±%
Conservative	John Blundell Maple	4,021	60.6	N/A
Liberal	James Henderson	2,609	39.4	New
Majority		1,412	21.2	N/A
Turnout		6,630	83.9	N/A
Registered electors		8,972		
Conservative hold		Swing	N/A	

1886 general election: Dulwich
Party	Candidate	Votes	%	±%
Conservative	John Morgan Howard	Unopposed		
Conservative hold				

1885 general election: Dulwich
Party	Candidate	Votes	%
Conservative	John Morgan Howard	4,406	61.9
Liberal	George Collins	2,712	38.1
Majority		1,694	23.8
Turnout		7,118	79.4
Registered electors		8,963	
Conservative win (new seat)			

== See also ==
- 1887 Dulwich by-election
- 1903 Dulwich by-election
- 1906 Dulwich by-election
- 1932 Dulwich by-election
- Southwark local elections

== Sources ==
- Leigh Rayment's Historical List of MPs – Constituencies beginning with "D" (part 3)
