= George Bracewell Smith =

Guy Bracewell Smith
- Born: George Bracewell Smith; 12 December 1912
- Died: 18 September 1976 (aged 63)
- Education: Wrekin College and Emmanuel College, Cambridge
- Occupation: Businessman
- Title: 2nd Baronet Keighley
- Spouse: Helene née Hydock (m. 1951–1976)
- Children: Guy and Charles

Sir George Bracewell Smith, 2nd Baronet MBE, (12 December 1912 – 18 September 1976), was a British City of London business man who owned the Ritz Hotel, London, as well as several others.

== Background and education ==
The son of Sir Bracewell Smith, 1st Baronet, KCVO (1884–1966), he was educated at Wrekin College and Emmanuel College, Cambridge.

== Family ==
Bracewell Smith married Helene Hydock, from Philadelphia, in 1951. They had two sons, Guy Bracewell Smith and Charles Bracewell-Smith.

== Career ==
Bracewell Smith was a City of London business man. He was Chairman of the Park Lane Hotel and the Ritz Hotel and a director of Arsenal Football Club. He sold the Ritz Hotel to Trafalgar House for £2.75m in 1976.

He was a director of Arsenal Football Club from 1953 to 1976, his father having been chairman from 1948 to 1962.

Baronetage of the United Kingdom
Preceded by Bracewell Smith	Baronet (of Keighley); 1966 – 1976	Succeeded by Guy Bracewell Smith
