= Smith baronets of Crantock (1642) =

Escutcheon of the Smith baronets of Crantock

The Smith baronetcy of Crantock, Cornwall was created in the Baronetage of England on 27 September 1642 for William Smithe or Smith, a London merchant. In common with other patents of baronetage issued by Charles I of England in the early stages of the English Civil War, effectively declared in August 1642, the award was disallowed by Parliament in November 1643.

Sir William Smith, 1st Baronet, married but left no male heir, and the baronetcy was extinct on his death in 1661.

Magna Britannia deduced from Smith's coat of arms a family connection with the Smiths of Tregonack (Tregonick, various spellings), while not finding that Smith had a seat at Crantock. John Smith, Member of Parliament for Camelford in 1559, was of Tregonack, Duloe, Cornwall.
