= Smith baronets of Long Ashton (first creation, 1661) =

Escutcheon of the Smith baronets of Long Ashton

The Smith baronetcy of Long Ashton, Somerset, was created in the Baronetage of England on 16 May 1661, for Hugh Smith of Ashton Court, following the English Restoration, in recognition of the family's loyalty to the Crown. His father Thomas had been Member of Parliament for Somerset in the Short Parliament, and Smith himself represented Somerset from 1660.

== Smith (or Smyth) of Long Ashton, Somerset (1661) ==
- Sir Hugh Smith, 1st Baronet (1632–1680)
- Sir John Smith, 2nd Baronet (c.1655–1726)
- Sir John Smith, 3rd Baronet (died 1741). He died without issue, and the baronetcy became extinct.

The baronetcy was recreated in 1763, for Jarrit Smith, son-in-law of the 3rd Baronet.
