= Sir Frederick Rowland, 1st Baronet =

Lord Mayor of London

Sir Frederick Rowland, 1st Baronet (25 December 1874 – 13 November 1959) was Lord Mayor of London for 1949 to 1950.

Frederick Rowland was born in Taunton, Somerset, the son of J E Rowland. He was educated at the Temple Wesleyan Day School in Upper High Street, and at the age of twelve became an errand boy for Messrs Waterman's estate agents and accountants in Paul Street, Taunton.

Later he was articled to Wentworth H Price of Cardiff, qualified as a chartered accountant in 1901, and in 1903 established the firm of F Rowland and Company, Chartered Accountants, in the City of London.

He became a member of the Common Council of the City of London in 1922, and was elected one of the sheriffs of the city in 1938. He was knighted in 1939, and in 1949 became Lord Mayor, receiving a baronetcy in the following year. He returned on occasion to Taunton, where his brother, W J Rowland of Beechcroft, Broadlands Road, was managing clerk in the office of H G Derwent Moger, Steward of the Manor of Taunton Deane.

Sir Frederick Rowland was elected an Honorary Freeman of the Borough of Taunton in 1950, and died on 13 November 1959, aged 84.

== See also ==
- Rowland baronets
