= National Literary Society =

Irish literary society

The National Literary Society (also known as the Irish National Literary Society) was founded in Dublin in 1892 by William Butler Yeats.

The members first met in John O’Leary's rooms on Mountjoy Square, and later formally at the Rotunda. Its first president was Douglas Hyde. On 25 November 1892 Hyde delivered a lecture to the society on The Necessity for De-Anglicising Ireland, a precursor to the founding of the Gaelic League.

A Book of Irish Verse, designed to publicise the new societies, was published in 1895, edited by Yeats and dedicated "To the Members of the National Literary Society of Dublin and the Irish Literary Society of London." It featured poetry by T. W. Rolleston, Hyde, Katharine Tynan, Lionel Johnson, AE and several others, with notes and an introduction by himself.

== See also ==
- Irish Literary Revival
- Irish Literary Society
