= Sunday Times Rich List 2007 =

Annual list of richest people in the UK

The Sunday Times Rich List 2007 was published on 29 April 2007. The online edition was published on 30 April 2007.

Since 1989, the UK national Sunday newspaper The Sunday Times (sister paper to The Times) has published an annual magazine supplement to the newspaper called the Sunday Times Rich List. The list is based on an estimate of the minimum wealth of the richest 1,000 people or families in the United Kingdom as of January of that year. A separate section lists the 250 richest Irish, including both Northern Ireland and the Republic of Ireland.

The top three places in the list were unchanged from the previous year. One of the most notable changes was the newspaper's revaluation of property developer Nasser David Khalili, placed 5th, with an estimated fortune of £5.8 billion. This included an estimated value of £4.5 billion for his art collection (an increase of £500 million from 2006) which was questioned by other sources.

== Top 12 fortunes ==
| 2007 | | Name | Citizenship | Source of wealth | 2006 | |
| Rank | Net worth £ bn | Name | Citizenship | Source of wealth | Rank | Net worth £ bn |
|---|---|---|---|---|---|---|
| 1 | £19.25 ▲ | Lakshmi Mittal | India | Steel | 1 | £14.88 |
| 2 | £10.80 | Roman Abramovich | Russia | Oil, industry | 2 | £10.80 |
| 3 | £7.00 ▲ | The Duke of Westminster | United Kingdom | Property | 2 | £6.60 |
| 4 ▲ | £6.20 ▲ | Srichand and Gopichand Hinduja | | Industry and finance | 7 | £3.60 |
| 5 ▲ | £5.80 ▲ | Nasser David Khalili | | Art and property | 99 | £0.61 |
| 5 ▼ | £5.40 ▲ | Hans Rausing and family | | Food packaging | 4 | £4.95 |
| 7 ▼ | £4.90 | Sir Philip and Lady Green | United Kingdom | Retailing | 5 | £4.90 |
| 8 ▲ | £3.50 ▲ | John Fredriksen | | Shipping | 10 | £2.86 |
| 8 ▼ | £3.49 ▲ | David and Simon Reuben | | Property | 8 | £3.25 |
| 10 ▲ | £3.30 ▲ | Jim Ratcliffe | | Chemicals | 45 | £1.10 |
| 11 ▼ | £3.10 ▲ | Richard Branson | United Kingdom | Transport, music, mobile phones, media (Virgin Group) | 9 | £3.06 |
| 12 ▼ | £3.05 ▲ | Charlene and Michel de Carvalho | Netherlands | Brewing (Heineken) | 11 | £2.60 |
| 12 ▲ | £3.05 ▲ | Seán Quinn and family | | Quarrying, property, insurance | 18 | £2.80 |

== See also ==
- List of billionaires (2007)
