= Smith baronets of Hatherton (1660) =

Escutcheon of the Smith baronets of Hatherton

The Smith baronetcy of Hatherton, Cheshire was created on 16 August 1660 in the Baronetage of England for Thomas Smith, a Royalist officer of the English Civil War. There was a special remainder to his brother Laurence and male heirs.

== Smith baronets of Hatherton, Cheshire (1660) ==
- Sir Thomas Smith, 1st Baronet (c.1622–1675), Member of Parliament for Cheshire 1661–1675
- Sir Thomas Smith, 2nd Baronet, son of Laurence Smith (died c. May 1706). The baronetcy became extinct on his death.
