= Harry Carr (cricketer) =

English cricketer and journalist

Personal information
- Full name: Harry Lascelles Carr
- Born: 8 October 1907; Lambeth, London England
- Died: 18 August 1943 (aged 35); Marylebone, London, England
- Batting: Right-handed
- Role: Wicket-keeper

Domestic team information
- Years: Team
- 1934: Glamorgan
- 1931: HDG Leveson-Gower's XI

Career statistics
Competition	First-class
Matches	3
Runs scored	54
Batting average	10.80
100s/50s	–/–
Top score	33
Balls bowled	–
Wickets	–
Bowling average	–
5 wickets in innings	–
10 wickets in match	–
Best bowling	–
Catches/stumpings	4/2
- Source: Cricinfo, 24 July 2011

Harry Lascelles Carr (8 October 1907 – 18 August 1943) was an English cricketer and journalist.

== Life ==
He was born in Lambeth, London, the son of News of the World editor Sir Emsley Carr and his wife Jenny Lascelles Carr. He was educated at Clifton College, before studying at Trinity Hall, Cambridge. While there, he gained a Cambridge Blue in billiards and golf. After graduating, he worked with his father at the News of the World.

Carr joined the Royal Air Force in World War II, being commissioned as a pilot officer on probation on 14 March 1941. Later being promoted to flight lieutenant, he worked within the intelligence branch of the RAF for two and a half years, before he was incapacitated by poor health. He died in Marylebone, London on 18 August 1943, following an operation.

== Cricket ==
A right-handed batsman who fielded as a wicket-keeper, Carr made his first-class debut for HDG Leveson-Gower's XI against Oxford University in 1931. He played a further match for Leveson-Gower's XI, against Cambridge University, with both matches coming at The Saffrons in 1931. He later made his only appearance for Glamorgan in 1934 against Cambridge University. In this match, he scored 6 runs before being stumped by Billy Griffith off the bowling of John Human.
