= Bracewell Smith =

British politician (1884–1966)

Sir Bracewell Smith Bt KCVO

Lord Mayor of London
- In office 1946–1947
- Preceded by: Sir Charles Davis
- Succeeded by: Sir Frederick Wells

Personal details
- Born: 29 June 1884 Keighley, West Yorkshire, England
- Died: 12 January 1966 (aged 81)

Sir Bracewell Smith, 1st Baronet (29 June 1884 – 12 January 1966) was a British businessman, Conservative Party politician and the 619th Lord Mayor of London.

== Biography ==
Born in Keighley, Yorkshire, he attended Wesley Place Primary School in the town. He started as a pupil teacher and attended Leeds University before entering business. He married Edith Whitaker in 1909 and had two children Eileen (born 1911) and George Bracewell Smith born in 1912.

=== Business ===
Smith made his fortune in property. In particular he was a major hotel investor/owner and who built the Park Lane Hotel in 1920. The Bracewell Smith family also owned The Ritz Hotel which Sir Bracewell Smith's son George (but known as Guy) sold to Trafalgar House for £2.75m in 1976. They at various times had stakes in the Carlton Hotel and Hôtel Ritz Paris.

Smith was also chairman of Arsenal Football Club from 1949 until 1962, and his descendants still held a significant shareholding in the club until 2011. His grandsons Clive and Richard Carr as well as Lady Nina Bracewell-Smith, his grandson Charles' wife, currently sit on the Arsenal board.

=== Politics ===
He turned to politics and was a member of Holborn Borough Council from 1922, serving as Mayor 1931–32, and served on the London County Council 1925–28. He was Conservative Member of Parliament (MP) for Dulwich between 1932 and 1945, Sheriff of the City of London in 1943 and Lord Mayor of London in 1946. Knighted in 1945, he was created a Baronet on 28 June 1947 and was appointed a Knight Commander of the Royal Victorian Order (KCVO) in the 1948 New Year Honours.

== Other ==
In 1958 he was made an Honorary Vice President of the Sports Turf Institute. He was also chairman of Wembley Stadium Ltd.

A freeman of Keighley (6 February 1957) he donated Cliffe Castle to the town for a museum.

The Sir Bracewell Smith Cup and rosette is awarded annually for best exhibit in the Keighley Show.

Parliament of the United Kingdom
| Preceded by Sir Frederick Hall | Member of Parliament for Dulwich; 1932–1945 | Succeeded by Wilfrid Vernon |
Civic offices
| Preceded by Charles Davis | Lord Mayor of London; 1946–1947 | Succeeded by Frederick Wells |
Baronetage of the United Kingdom
| New creation | Baronet (of Keighley); 1947–1966 | Succeeded by George Bracewell Smith |
