= Peckham by-election =

Peckham by-election may refer to several by-elections in the Peckham area of London:

- 1908 Peckham by-election, a Conservative gain from the Liberals
- 1936 Peckham by-election, a Labour gain from the Conservatives
- 1982 Peckham by-election, retained by Labour
