= Peckham (UK Parliament constituency) =

UK Parliament constituency (1885–1997, 2024 onwards)

- Borough constituency for the House of Commons
- Interactive map of boundaries from 2024
- Location within Greater London
- County: Greater London
- Electorate: 71,176 (March 2020)

Current constituency
- Created: 2024
- Member of Parliament: Miatta Fahnbulleh (Labour Co-op)
- Seats: One
- Created from: Camberwell and Peckham, Bermondsey and Old Southwark

1885–1997
- Created from: Lambeth
- Replaced by: Camberwell and Peckham, North Southwark and Bermondsey

Peckham is a borough constituency in South London which returns one Member of Parliament (MP) to the House of Commons of the Parliament of the United Kingdom. Elections are held using the first-past-the-post voting system.

It was created for the 1885 general election, abolished for the 1997 general election and, further to the completion of the 2023 review of Westminster constituencies, re-established for the 2024 general election.

Between 1997 and 2024 the constituency was primarily replaced by the now abolished constituency of Camberwell and Peckham.

== Constituency profile ==
Horsley Street in Walworth with part of the Aylesbury Estate in the background

Peckham is a constituency in Greater London in England, within the Borough of Southwark. It covers the neighbourhoods of Peckham, Walworth and parts of Camberwell.

Peckham is a densely-populated urban area located around 3 miles (4.8 km) south-east of the centre of London. The area was mostly rural until the Victorian era when it was absorbed into the expanding London conurbation. Much of Peckham and Walworth were redeveloped in the 1960s into large council estates and the area became typical of working-class London, with most residents living in blocks of flats or dense Victorian terraces. Today, the area has high levels of deprivation, especially in the constituency's north-east. House prices are generally lower than the London average, but due to the constituency's location close to the centre of the capital, the average price is still almost double the UK average.

Peckham has a large population of young adults and a very low proportion of retirees. Residents' household income is low compared to the rest of London and very few are homeowners. The child poverty rate is above-average. Residents are generally well-educated and a high proportion work in the health and public sectors. The percentage claiming unemployment benefits is high. White people made up 41% of the population at the 2021 census, around a third of whom were of non-British origin, including a large Spanish community. Black people made up 34% of residents, mostly of West African origin. Asians were 9% with a large population of Chinese origin.

At the local borough council, Peckham is represented by a mixture of Labour Party and Green Party councillors. Voters here strongly supported remaining in the European Union in the 2016 referendum; an estimated 69% voted to remain compared to the UK-wide figure of 48%.

== History ==
The constituency was, by the time of its abolition in 1997, a safe Labour seat. It was held for the last thirteen years of its existence by Harriet Harman, who held the successor seat of Camberwell and Peckham during the whole of its existence, and went on to become the deputy leader of the Labour Party.

The constituency shared boundaries with the Peckham electoral division for election of councillors to the Greater London Council at elections in 1973, 1977 and 1981.

== Boundaries ==
=== Historic ===
- 1885–1918: The wards of North Peckham and South Peckham.
- 1918–1950: The Metropolitan Borough of Camberwell wards of Clifton, Goldsmith, Nunhead, Rye Lane, St Mary's, and The Rye.
- 1950–1974: The Metropolitan Borough of Camberwell wards of Addington, Clifton, Coburg, Goldsmith, Marlborough, North Peckham, St George's, St Giles, St Mary's, The West, and Town Hall.
- 1974–1983: The London Borough of Southwark wards of Brunswick, Burgess, Consort, Faraday, Friary, Newington, and St Giles.
- 1983–1997: The London Borough of Southwark wards of Barset, Brunswick, Consort, Faraday, Friary, Liddle, Newington, and St Giles.

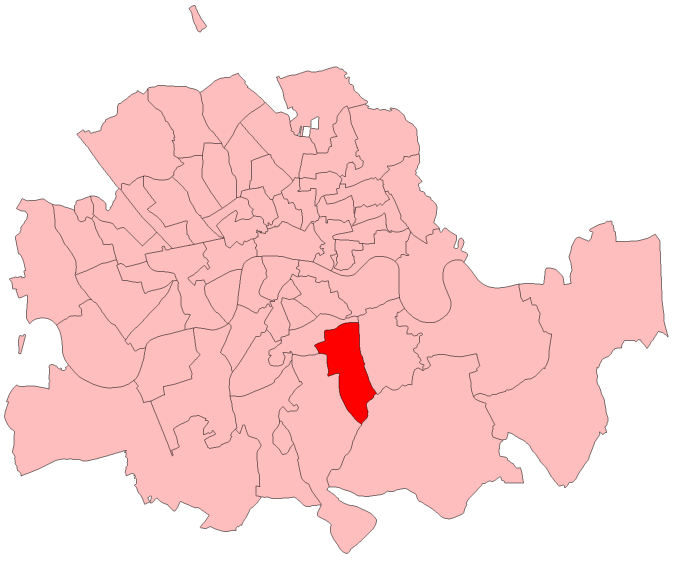
Peckham in London, 1885–1918

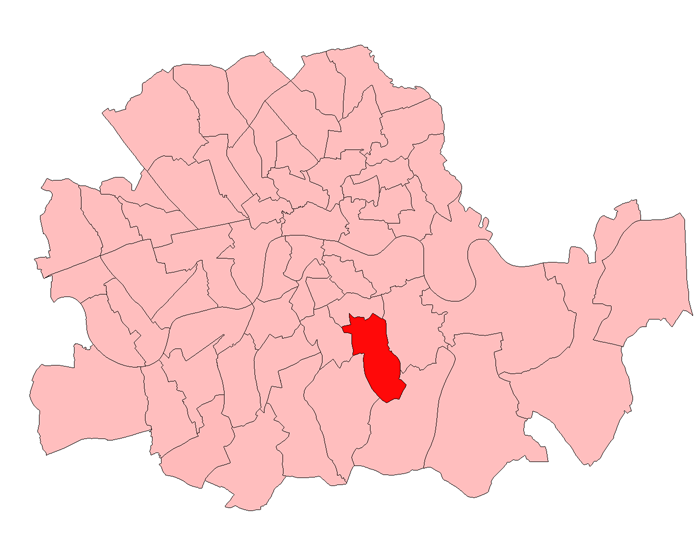
Peckham in London, 1918–1950

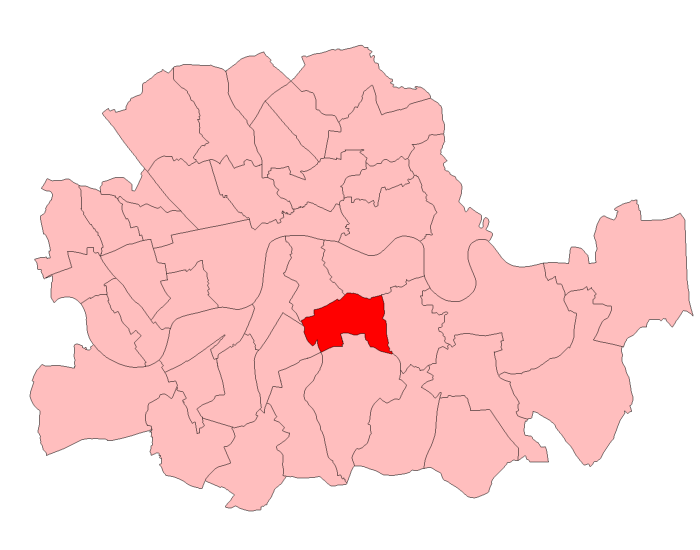
Peckham in London, 1950–1974

=== Current ===
Further to the 2023 review of Westminster constituencies, which came into effect for the 2024 general election, the re-established constituency is composed of the following wards of the London Borough of Southwark (as they existed on 1 December 2020):

- Faraday; North Walworth; Nunhead & Queen's Road; Old Kent Road; Peckham; Rye Lane; St. Giles.

The contents reflect the new ward structure which became effective in May 2018. The re-established seat primarily comprises the majority of the abolished constituency of Camberwell and Peckham, together with parts of Bermondsey and Old Southwark (mainly North Walworth).

== Members of Parliament ==
Election	Member	Party
1885	Arthur A. Baumann	Conservative
1892	Sir Frederick Banbury	Conservative
1906	Charles Clarke	Liberal
1908 by-election	Henry Gooch	Conservative
Dec. 1910	Albion Richardson	Liberal
1916	Albion Richardson	Coalition Liberal
Jan 1922	Albion Richardson	National Liberal
1922	Collingwood Hughes	Conservative
1924	Hugh Dalton	Labour
1929	John Beckett	Labour
1931	David Beatty	Conservative
1936 by-election	Lewis Silkin	Labour
1950	Freda Corbet	Labour
Feb 1974	Harry Lamborn	Labour
1982 by-election	Harriet Harman	Labour
1997	constituency abolished: see Camberwell and Peckham & Southwark North and Bermondsey	
2024	Miatta Fahnbulleh	Labour Co-op

== Elections ==
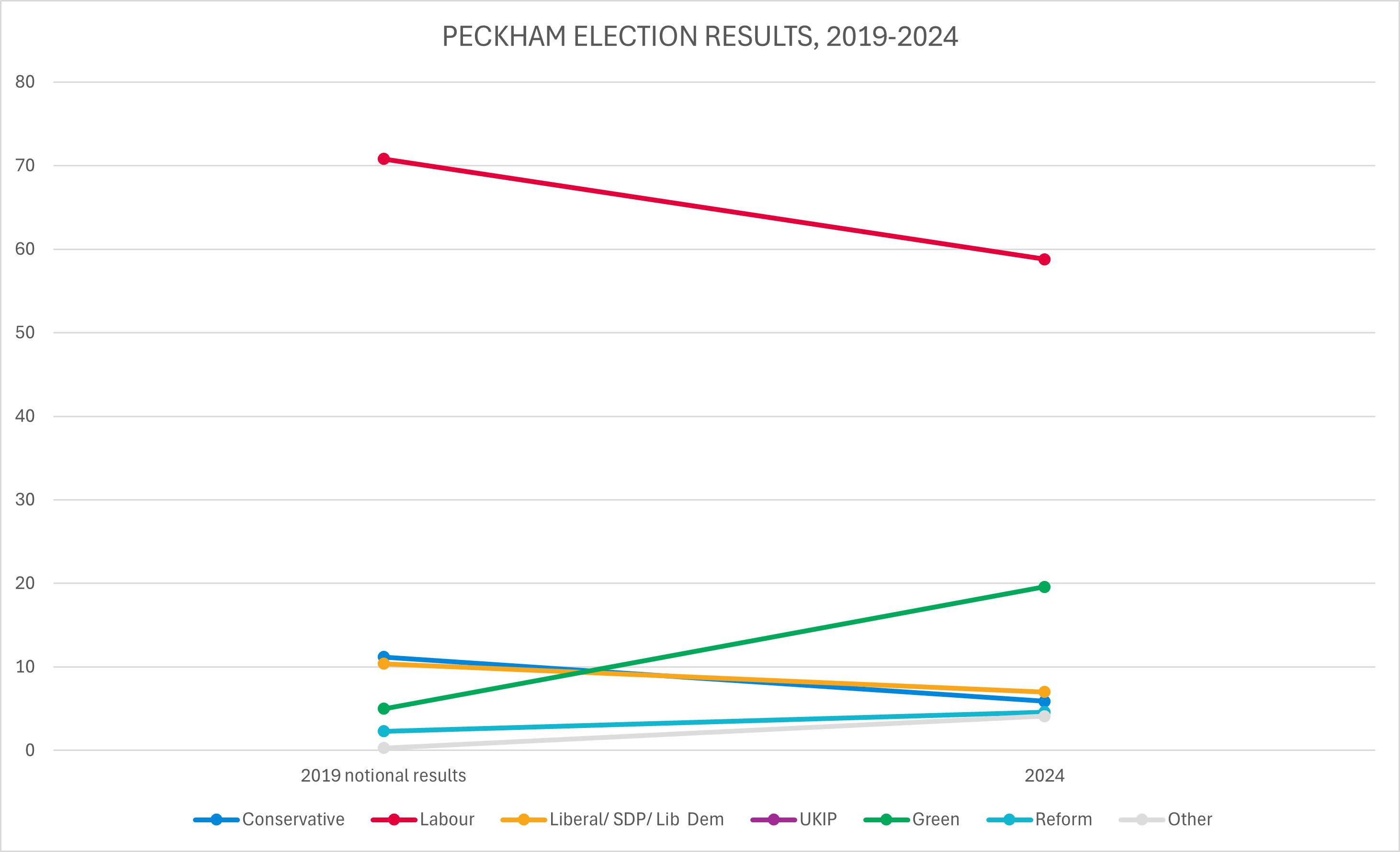
Election results 2019-2024

=== Elections in the 2020s ===
General election 2024: Peckham
Party	Candidate	Votes	%	±%
Labour Co-op	Miatta Fahnbulleh	22,813	58.8	−12.0
Green	Claire Sheppard	7,585	19.6	+14.6
Liberal Democrats	David Watson	2,724	7.0	−3.4
Conservative	Ben Mascall	2,276	5.9	−5.3
Reform	Linda Purcell	1,790	4.6	+2.3
Independent	Jennifer Blake	555	1.4	N/A
Workers Revolutionary	Mariatu Kargbo	355	0.9	+0.6
Rejoin EU	Alex Kerr	285	0.7	N/A
Yoruba Party	Olusola Oni	261	0.7	N/A
Independent	Stefan Harvey	153	0.4	N/A
Majority		15,228	39.2	−20.4
Turnout		38,797	53.8	−8.8
Registered electors		72,123		
Labour Co-op hold		Swing	−13.3	

=== Elections in the 2010s ===
2019 notional result
Party	Vote	%
Labour	31,552	70.8
Conservative	4,999	11.2
Liberal Democrats	4,626	10.4
Green	2,232	5.0
Brexit Party	1,011	2.3
Others	127	0.3
Turnout	44,547	62.6
Electorate	71,176	

=== Elections in the 1990s ===
General election 1992: Peckham
Party	Candidate	Votes	%	±%
Labour	Harriet Harman	19,391	61.8	+7.3
Conservative	Christopher Frazer	7,386	23.5	−2.2
Liberal Democrats	Rose Colley	4,331	13.8	−4.1
Workers Revolutionary	Gilbert Dacres	146	0.5	N/A
Corrective	Victor Teh	140	0.4	N/A
Majority		12,005	38.3	+9.5
Turnout		31,394	53.8	−1.8
Labour hold		Swing	+4.7	

=== Elections in the 1980s ===
General election 1987: Peckham
Party	Candidate	Votes	%	±%
Labour	Harriet Harman	17,965	54.5	+2.9
Conservative	Lillian Ingram	8,476	25.7	+1.5
Liberal	Richard Shearman	5,878	17.9	−3.8
Green	Doreen Robinson	628	1.9	N/A
Majority		9,489	28.8	+1.4
Turnout		32,947	55.6	+1.1
Labour hold		Swing	+0.7	

General election 1983: Peckham
Party	Candidate	Votes	%	±%
Labour	Harriet Harman	16,616	51.6	+1.3
Conservative	Tobias Eckersley	7,792	24.2	+9.8
SDP	Andrew Sawdon	7,006	21.7	−20.2
National Front	Mary Bailey	800	2.5	−1.4
Majority		8,824	27.4	
Turnout		32,214	54.5	
Labour hold		Swing	-2.2	

1982 Peckham by-election
Party	Candidate	Votes	%	±%
Labour	Harriet Harman	11,349	50.3	−9.5
SDP	Dick Taverne	7,418	32.9	+25.2
Conservative	John Redwood	2,800	12.4	−15.7
National Front	Martin Webster	874	3.9	−0.7
Democratic Monarchist, Public Safety, White Resident	Bill Boaks	102	0.5	N/A
Majority		3,931	17.4	−14.4
Turnout		22,543		
Labour hold		Swing	-17.4	

=== Elections in the 1970s ===
General election 1979: Peckham
Party	Candidate	Votes	%	±%
Labour	Harry Lamborn	20,364	59.85	
Conservative	Andrew Dalton	9,553	28.07	
Liberal	Terence Minahan	2,607	7.66	
National Front	Muriel Roberts	1,503	4.6	N/A
Majority		10,811	31.78	
Turnout		32,524	57.66	
Labour hold		Swing		

General election October 1974: Peckham
Party	Candidate	Votes	%	±%
Labour	Harry Lamborn	24,587	71.64	
Conservative	Nicholas Baker	5,760	16.78	
Liberal	S.W.F. Saltmarsh	3,971	11.57	
Majority		18,827	54.86	
Turnout		34,318	54.17	
Labour hold		Swing		

General election February 1974: Peckham
Party	Candidate	Votes	%	±%
Labour	Harry Lamborn	26,116	64.31	
Conservative	Nicholas Baker	8,045	19.81	
Liberal	S.W.F. Saltmarsh	6,446	15.87	N/A
Majority		18,071	44.50	
Turnout		40,607	64.59	
Labour hold		Swing		

General election 1970: Peckham
Party	Candidate	Votes	%	±%
Labour	Freda Corbet	17,071	67.47	
Conservative	Ivan Lawrence	8,232	32.53	
Majority		8,839	34.93	
Turnout		25,303	49.80	
Labour hold		Swing		

=== Elections in the 1960s ===
General election 1966: Peckham
Party	Candidate	Votes	%	±%
Labour	Freda Corbet	20,630	72.00	
Conservative	Ivan Lawrence	8,023	28.00	
Majority		12,607	44.00	
Turnout		28,653	55.61	
Labour hold		Swing		

General election 1964: Peckham
Party	Candidate	Votes	%	±%
Labour	Freda Corbet	20,111	63.97	
Conservative	Toby Jessel	11,326	36.03	
Majority		8,785	27.94	
Turnout		31,437	58.30	
Labour hold		Swing		

=== Elections in the 1950s ===
General election 1959: Peckham
Party	Candidate	Votes	%	±%
Labour	Freda Corbet	24,389	65.22	
Conservative	Alfred Frank Lockwood	13,007	34.78	
Majority		11,382	30.44	
Turnout		37,396	64.64	
Labour hold		Swing		

General election 1955: Peckham
Party	Candidate	Votes	%	±%
Labour	Freda Corbet	26,315	67.71	
Conservative	Dudley Smith	12,547	32.29	
Majority		13,768	35.42	
Turnout		38,862	63.66	
Labour hold		Swing		

General election 1951: Peckham
Party	Candidate	Votes	%	±%
Labour	Freda Corbet	33,702	69.84	
Conservative	Cecil Vernon Ford	14,557	30.16	
Majority		19,146	39.68	
Turnout		48,259	75.62	
Labour hold		Swing		

General election 1950: Peckham
Party	Candidate	Votes	%	±%
Labour	Freda Corbet	32,623	66.44	
Conservative	Edwin Horace Lee	13,323	27.13	
Liberal	Kenneth George P. Gunnell	2,267	4.62	N/A
Communist	T. Gibson	886	1.80	N/A
Majority		19,300	39.31	
Turnout		49,099	77.59	
Labour hold		Swing		

=== Elections in the 1940s ===
General election 1945: Peckham
Party	Candidate	Votes	%	±%
Labour	Lewis Silkin	12,935	68.69	
Conservative	R.J.L. O'Connell	5,896	31.31	
Majority		7,039	37.38	
Turnout		18,831	65.52	
Labour hold		Swing		

=== Elections in the 1930s ===
1936 Peckham by-election
Party	Candidate	Votes	%	±%
Labour	Lewis Silkin	13,007	50.2	−1.5
Conservative	P.G.A. Harvey	12,907	49.8	−1.5
Majority		100	0.4	N/A
Turnout		25,914	56.5	−8.3
Labour gain from Conservative				

General election 1935: Peckham
Party	Candidate	Votes	%	±%
Conservative	David Beatty	15,229	51.30	
Labour	Lewis Silkin	14,457	48.70	
Majority		772	2.60	
Turnout		29,686	64.78	
Conservative hold		Swing		

General election 1931: Peckham
Party	Candidate	Votes	%	±%
Conservative	David Beatty	19,458	58.1	+26.3
Ind. Labour Party	John Beckett	11,217	33.5	−15.4
National Labour	E J Titler	1,442	4.3	N/A
Labour	Hubert Beaumont	1,350	4.0	−44.9
Majority		8,241	24.6	N/A
Turnout		33,467	69.7	+2.7
Conservative gain from Labour		Swing		

=== Elections in the 1920s ===
General election 1929: Peckham
Party	Candidate	Votes	%	±%
Labour	John Beckett	15,751	48.9	+2.8
Unionist	Douglas Cooke	10,246	31.8	−11.1
Liberal	George Ivor Phillips	6,187	19.2	+8.2
Majority		5,505	17.1	+13.9
Turnout		32,184	67.0	−7.2
Labour hold		Swing	+6.9	

General election 1924: Peckham
Party	Candidate	Votes	%	±%
Labour	Hugh Dalton	13,361	46.1	+10.8
Unionist	Martin Archer-Shee	12,414	42.9	+6.9
Liberal	Joseph Nathaniel Emery	3,194	11.0	−17.7
Majority		947	3.2	N/A
Turnout		28,969	74.2	+12.8
Labour gain from Unionist		Swing	+2.0	

General election 1923: Peckham
Party	Candidate	Votes	%	±%
Unionist	Collingwood Hughes	8,526	36.0	−8.4
Labour	Walter Ashbridge Chambers	8,370	35.3	+11.7
Liberal	Charles William Tagg	6,815	28.7	+23.4
Majority		156	0.7	−17.0
Turnout		23,711	61.4	−4.7
Unionist hold		Swing	-10.0	

General election 1922: Peckham
Party	Candidate	Votes	%	±%
Unionist	Collingwood Hughes	11,218	44.4	+15.7
National Liberal	Henry Lesser	6,739	26.7	–28.5
Labour	Walter Ashbridge Chambers	5,964	23.6	+7.5
Liberal	Gerald Spence Tetley	1,329	5.3	N/A
Majority		4,479	17.7	N/A
Turnout		25,250	66.1	+23.1
Unionist gain from National Liberal		Swing		

=== Elections in the 1910s ===
General election 1918: Peckham
Party		Candidate	Votes	%	±%
C	National Liberal	Albion Richardson	8,764	55.2	+5.0
	Ind. Unionist	Collingwood Hughes	4,550	28.7	−21.1
	Labour	Charles Diamond	2,559	16.1	N/A
Majority			4,214	26.5	+26.1
Turnout			15,873	43.0	−38.1
	National Liberal hold		Swing	+13.2	
C indicates candidate endorsed by the coalition government.

AHH Richardson

General election December 1910: Peckham
Party	Candidate	Votes	%	±%
Liberal	Albion Richardson	5,027	50.2	+0.6
Conservative	Henry Gooch	4,986	49.8	−0.6
Majority		41	0.4	N/A
Turnout		12,341	81.1	+4.6
Liberal gain from Conservative		Swing	+0.6	

General election January 1910: Peckham
Party	Candidate	Votes	%	±%
Conservative	Henry Gooch	5,330	50.4	+12.8
Liberal	Albion Richardson	5,247	49.6	−12.8
Majority		83	0.8	−12.0
Turnout		12,341	85.7	+9.4
Conservative hold		Swing	-10.5	

=== Elections in the 1900s ===
1908 Peckham by-election
Party	Candidate	Votes	%	±%
Conservative	Henry Gooch	6,970	60.9	+23.3
Liberal	Thomas Gautrey	4,476	39.1	−23.3
Majority		2,494	21.8	N/A
Turnout		11,446	78.3	+2.0
Registered electors		14,615		
Conservative gain from Liberal		Swing	+23.3	

General election 1906: Peckham
Party	Candidate	Votes	%	±%
Liberal	Charles Clarke	5,903	62.4	+21.7
Conservative	Frederick Banbury	3,564	37.6	−21.7
Majority		2,339	12.8	N/A
Turnout		9,467	76.3	+12.8
Registered electors		12,401		
Liberal gain from Conservative		Swing	+21.7	

Hemphill

General election 1900: Peckham
Party	Candidate	Votes	%	±%
Conservative	Frederick Banbury	4,453	59.3	+2.9
Liberal	Fitzroy Hemphill	3,061	40.7	−2.9
Majority		1,392	18.6	+5.8
Turnout		7,514	63.5	−6.5
Registered electors		11,835		
Conservative hold		Swing	+2.9	

=== Elections in the 1890s ===
General election 1895: Peckham
Party	Candidate	Votes	%	±%
Conservative	Frederick Banbury	4,495	56.4	+5.8
Liberal	Charles Clements	3,472	43.6	−4.6
Majority		1,023	12.8	+10.4
Turnout		7,967	70.0	0.0
Registered electors		11,388		
Conservative hold		Swing	+5.2	

FG Banbury

General election 1892: Peckham
Party	Candidate	Votes	%	±%
Conservative	Frederick Banbury	3,847	50.6	−5.5
Liberal	Edwin Jones	3,664	48.2	+4.3
Independent Labour	Ben Ellis	95	1.2	N/A
Majority		183	2.4	−9.8
Turnout		7,606	70.0	+6.9
Registered electors		10,861		
Conservative hold		Swing	-4.9	

=== Elections in the 1880s ===
General election 1886: Peckham
Party	Candidate	Votes	%	±%
Conservative	Arthur A. Baumann	3,439	56.1	+7.1
Liberal	William Willis	2,688	43.9	+1.3
Majority		751	12.2	+5.8
Turnout		6,127	63.1	−7.6
Registered electors		9,713		
Conservative hold		Swing	+2.9	

General election 1885: Peckham
Party	Candidate	Votes	%	±%
Conservative	Arthur A. Baumann	3,362	49.0	
Liberal	William Willis	2,929	42.6	
Independent Liberal	Edward Dresser Rogers	580	8.4	
Majority		433	6.4	
Turnout		6,871	70.7	
Registered electors		9,713		
Conservative win (new seat)				

== See also ==
- Southwark local elections
- parliamentary constituencies in London

== Bibliography ==
- British Parliamentary Election Results 1885–1918, compiled and edited by F.W.S. Craig (Macmillan Press 1974)
- Debrett's Illustrated Heraldic and Biographical House of Commons and the Judicial Bench 1886
- Debrett's House of Commons and the Judicial Bench 1901
- Debrett's House of Commons and the Judicial Bench 1918
- Leigh Rayment's Historical List of MPs – Constituencies beginning with "P" (part 1)
