= Peckham (electoral division) =

Electoral division in Greater London, 1973–1986

- Former electoral division for the Greater London Council
- Peckham electoral division boundaries
- District: Southwark
- Electorate: 63,953 (1973); 58,655 (1977); 58,538 (1981)
- Major settlements: Peckham
- Area: 615 hectares (6.15 km^{2}) (1973); 638 hectares (6.38 km^{2}) (1977/1981)

Former electoral division
- Created: 1973
- Abolished: 1986
- Member: 1
- Created from: Southwark

Peckham was an electoral division for the purposes of elections to the Greater London Council. The constituency elected one councillor for a four-year term in 1973, 1977 and 1981, with the final term extended for an extra year ahead of the abolition of the Greater London Council.

== History ==
It was planned to use the same boundaries as the Westminster Parliament constituencies for election of councillors to the Greater London Council (GLC), as had been the practice for elections to the predecessor London County Council, but those that existed in 1965 crossed the Greater London boundary. Until new constituencies could be settled, the 32 London boroughs were used as electoral areas. The London Borough of Southwark formed the Southwark electoral division. This was used for the Greater London Council elections in 1964, 1967 and 1970.

The new constituencies were settled following the Second Periodic Review of Westminster constituencies and the new electoral division matched the boundaries of the Peckham parliamentary constituency.

The area was in a long-term period of population decline that was yet to reverse. The electorate reduced from 63,953 in 1973 to 58,538 in 1981. It covered an area of 615 hectares (6.15 km^{2}) in 1973. Revisions to ward boundaries in the London Borough of Southwark changed the area of the division to 638 hectares (6.38 km^{2}) for the 1977 and 1981 elections.

== Elections ==
The Peckham constituency was used for the Greater London Council elections in 1973, 1977 and 1981. One councillor was elected at each election using first-past-the-post voting.

=== 1973 election ===
The fourth election to the GLC (and first using revised boundaries) was held on 12 April 1973. The electorate was 63,953 and one Labour Party councillor was elected. The turnout was 25.6%. The councillor was elected for a three-year term. This was extended for an extra year in 1976 when the electoral cycle was switched to four-yearly.

1973 Greater London Council election: Peckham
Party	Candidate	Votes	%	±%
Labour	Harvey William Hinds	14,134	86.46	
Conservative	N. B. Baker	2,214	13.54	
Turnout				
Labour win (new seat)				

=== 1977 election ===
The fifth election to the GLC (and second using revised boundaries) was held on 5 May 1977. The electorate was 58,655 and one Labour Party councillor was elected. The turnout was 31.1%. The councillor was elected for a four-year term.

1977 Greater London Council election: Peckham
Party	Candidate	Votes	%	±%
Labour	Harvey William Hinds	10,312	56.78	
Conservative	A. S. Dalton	5,091	28.02	
National Front	J. R. Perryman	1,482	8.16	
National Party	R. A. W. Jackson	708	3.90	
Liberal	T. J. Minahan	576	3.17	
Turnout				
Labour hold		Swing		

=== 1981 election ===
The sixth and final election to the GLC (and third using revised boundaries) was held on 7 May 1981. The electorate was 58,538 and one Labour Party councillor was elected. The turnout was 31.3%. The councillor was elected for a four-year term, extended by an extra year by the Local Government (Interim Provisions) Act 1984, ahead of the abolition of the council.

1981 Greater London Council election: Peckham
Party	Candidate	Votes	%	±%
Labour	Harvey William Hinds	12,461	68.34	
Conservative	John Alan Redwood	2,702	14.82	
Liberal	Gillian Isabel Clemens	1,669	9.15	
National Front	Wayne L Martin	971	5.33	
Communist	Eric L Hodson	313	1.72	
Abolish the GLC	Brian W Dames	116	0.64	
Turnout				
Labour hold		Swing		

John Alan Redwood unsuccessfully stood to be an MP at the 1982 Peckham by-election.
