= Camberwell and Peckham =

UK Parliament constituency (1997–2024)

Coordinates: 51.475°N 0.070°W

- Former borough constituency for the House of Commons
- Boundary of Camberwell and Peckham in Greater London
- County: Greater London
- Population: 125,226 (2011 census)
- Electorate: 78,605 (December 2010)

1997–2024
- Seats: One
- Created from: Peckham
- Replaced by: Peckham; Vauxhall and Camberwell Green; Bermondsey and Old Southwark; Lewisham West and East Dulwich; Dulwich and West Norwood

Camberwell and Peckham was a constituency (Note: A borough constituency (for the purposes of election expenses and type of returning officer)) (Note: As with all constituencies, the constituency elects one Member of Parliament (MP) by the first past the post system of election at least every five years.) represented in the House of Commons of the UK Parliament by Harriet Harman of the Labour Party from its creation in 1997 until its abolition at the 2024 general election. Harman had served for the previous constituency of Peckham since 1982, rose to become a cabinet minister, and eventually was the "Mother of the House of Commons", having the longest record of continuous service of any female MP.

Under the 2023 periodic review of Westminster constituencies, the majority of the constituency was incorporated into the re-established seat of Peckham.

== Constituency profile ==
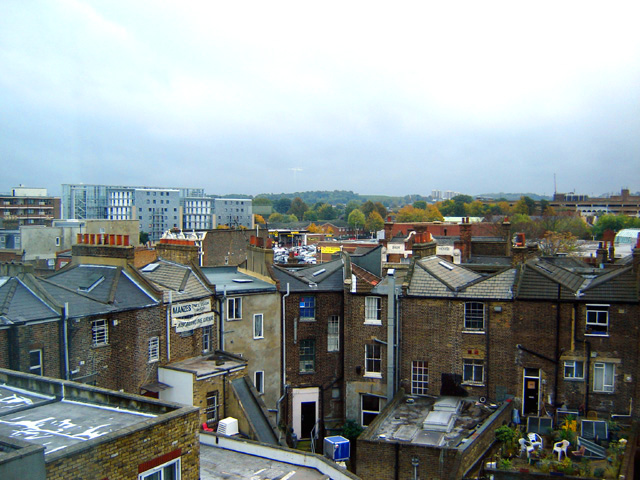
Peckham

The constituency was very ethnically diverse, and had the highest proportion of black, African, and Afro-Caribbean residents of all constituencies in England and Wales, according to Office for National Statistics 2011 Census figures, at 37.4%. This included 22.4% African residents (highest), 9.3% Caribbean, and 5.7% of any other black background (highest). More than two-fifths (40.8%) of residents were born outside of the UK.

With 50.6% of all residential properties being social housing, it also had the highest proportion of social housing of any parliamentary constituency in the United Kingdom. More than three in ten residents were single parents.

The area was also socially diverse, with fine Georgian houses in parts of Camberwell, while Nunhead to the east had experienced considerable regeneration in recent years.

At least two conservation area groupings existed, containing pockets of upmarket housing stock, principally Camberwell Grove and Camberwell Green. The housing stock had expanded in the early-21st century, due to major increases in Central London property prices, which had led to new private sector-funded housing initiatives. As such, rents across the private rented sector had multiplied, affecting the long-term communities, who had entrenched high reliance overall on the rented sector, pushing residents away by eviction or further away from owning their own homes near to their communities.

King's College Hospital, one of London's largest teaching hospitals, and the Maudsley Hospital were major employers in the constituency. One in seven residents were employed in human health and social work.

Racial makeup (2021)
| Demographic category | Population percentage |
|---|---|
| White | 44.8% |
| Black | 33.5% |
| Asian | 7.7% |
| Mixed | 7.5% |
| Other | 6.5% |

== Boundaries ==
Map of boundaries 2010-2024

1997–2010: The London Borough of Southwark wards of Barset, Brunswick, Consort, Faraday, Friary, Liddle, St Giles, The Lane, and Waverley.

2010–2024: The London Borough of Southwark wards of Brunswick Park, Camberwell Green, Faraday, Livesey, Nunhead, Peckham, Peckham Rye, South Camberwell, and The Lane.

The constituency incorporated the areas of Camberwell, Peckham and Nunhead in the London Borough of Southwark, together with parts of its other districts of Walworth, East Dulwich, South Bermondsey and Rotherhithe.

== Political history ==
The constituency was created in time for the 1997 United Kingdom general election. All results after that showed strong Labour Party vote shares, with the party gaining between 59 and 77 per cent of the votes. As the predecessor seats were Labour (in this instance the length of party tenure can be dated to 1936), and most of the council wards had strong majorities for the party too, the seat had the three main hallmarks of a safe seat.

Its only MP was Harriet Harman, a former Cabinet minister and former Deputy Leader of the Labour Party, twice acting leader of the party during leadership elections in 2010 and 2015, and a former Shadow Culture Secretary. She had also been the MP for the preceding constituency of Peckham since a by-election in 1982.

== Members of Parliament ==
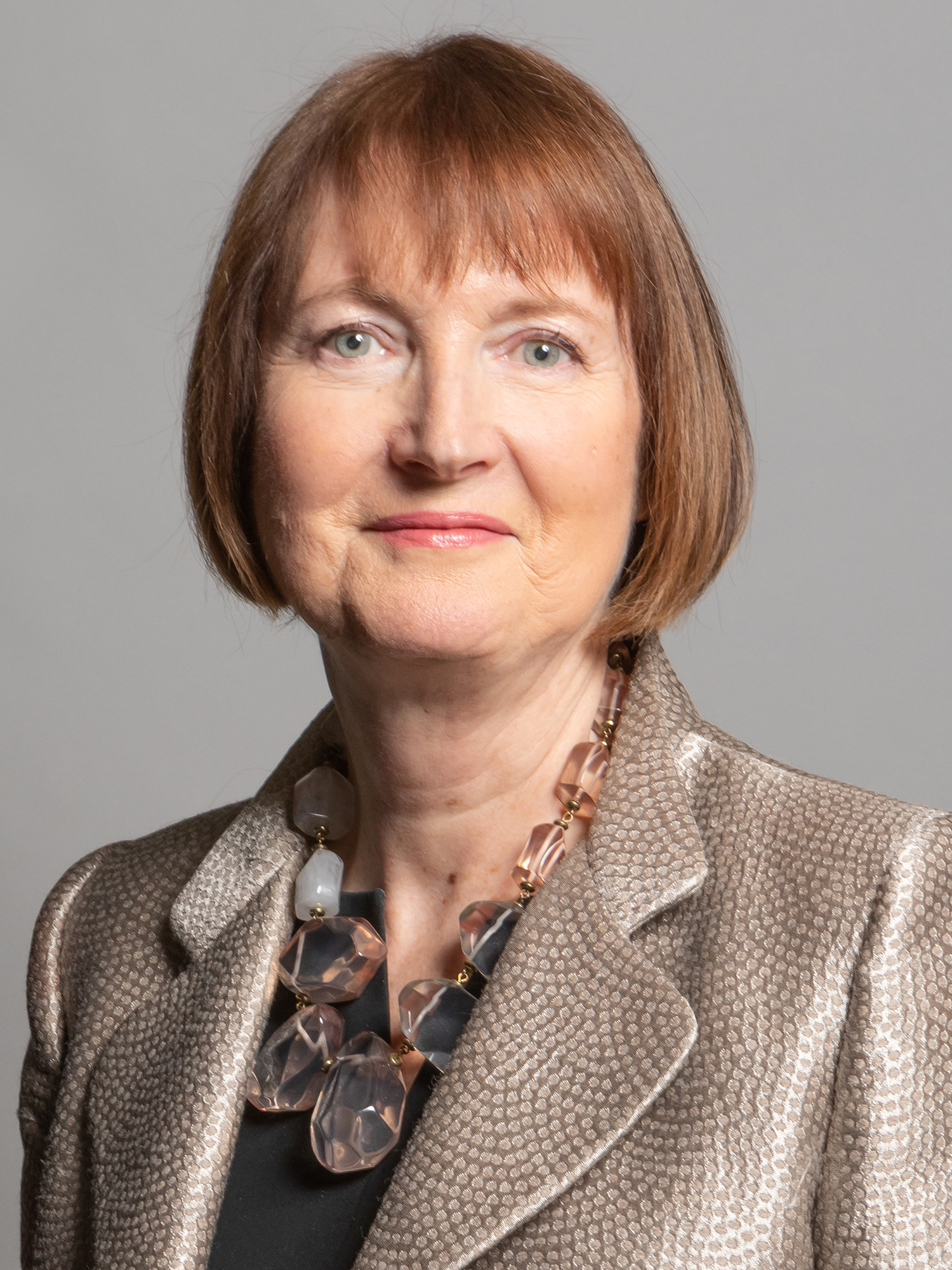
Harriet Harman, Labour MP for Camberwell and Peckham

| Election | Member | Party |
|---|---|---|
| 1997 | Harriet Harman | Labour |

== Election results ==
=== Elections in the 2010s ===
General election 2019: Camberwell and Peckham
| Party | Candidate | Votes | % | ±% |
|---|---|---|---|---|
| Labour | Harriet Harman | 40,258 | 71.3 | –6.5 |
| Conservative | Peter Quentin | 6,478 | 11.5 | –1.3 |
| Liberal Democrats | Julia Ogiehor | 5,087 | 9.0 | +3.1 |
| Green | Claire Sheppard | 3,501 | 6.2 | +3.4 |
| Brexit Party | Claude Cass-Horne | 1,041 | 1.8 | New |
| Workers Revolutionary | Joshua Ogunleye | 127 | 0.2 | 0.0 |
| Majority | | 33,780 | 59.8 | –5.2 |
| Turnout | | 56,492 | 63.4 | –3.7 |
| Registered electors | | 89,042 | | |
| Labour hold | | Swing | –2.6 | |

General election 2017: Camberwell and Peckham
| Party | Candidate | Votes | % | ±% |
|---|---|---|---|---|
| Labour | Harriet Harman | 44,665 | 77.8 | +14.5 |
| Conservative | Ben Spencer | 7,349 | 12.8 | –0.4 |
| Liberal Democrats | Michael Bukola | 3,413 | 5.9 | +0.9 |
| Green | Eleanor Margolies | 1,627 | 2.8 | –7.3 |
| CPA | Ray Towey | 227 | 0.4 | New |
| Workers Revolutionary | Sellu Aminata | 131 | 0.2 | New |
| Majority | | 37,316 | 65.0 | +14.9 |
| Turnout | | 57,412 | 67.1 | +4.8 |
| Registered electors | | 85,613 | | |
| Labour hold | | Swing | +7.5 | |

General election 2015: Camberwell and Peckham
| Party | Candidate | Votes | % | ±% |
|---|---|---|---|---|
| Labour | Harriet Harman | 32,614 | 63.3 | +4.1 |
| Conservative | Naomi Newstead | 6,790 | 13.2 | +0.2 |
| Green | Amelia Womack | 5,187 | 10.1 | +7.2 |
| Liberal Democrats | Yahaya Kiyingi | 2,580 | 5.0 | –17.4 |
| UKIP | David Kurten | 2,413 | 4.7 | New |
| All People's Party | Prem Goyal | 829 | 1.6 | New |
| NHA | Rebecca Fox | 466 | 0.9 | New |
| TUSC | Nick Wrack | 292 | 0.6 | New |
| CISTA | Alex Robertson | 197 | 0.4 | New |
| Workers Revolutionary | Joshua Ogunleye | 107 | 0.2 | –0.3 |
| Whig | Felicity Anscomb | 86 | 0.2 | New |
| Majority | | 25,824 | 50.1 | +11.3 |
| Turnout | | 51,561 | 62.3 | +3.0 |
| Registered electors | | 82,746 | | |
| Labour hold | | Swing | +2.0 | |

General election 2010: Camberwell and Peckham
| Party | Candidate | Votes | % | ±% |
|---|---|---|---|---|
| Labour | Harriet Harman | 27,619 | 59.2 | –4.1 |
| Liberal Democrats | Columba Blango | 10,432 | 22.4 | +1.9 |
| Conservative | Andrew Stranack | 6,080 | 13.0 | +4.2 |
| Green | Jenny Jones | 1,361 | 2.9 | –1.7 |
| English Democrat | Yohara Munilla | 435 | 0.9 | New |
| Workers Revolutionary | Joshua Ogunleye | 211 | 0.5 | +0.2 |
| Socialist Labour | Margaret M. Sharkey | 184 | 0.4 | –0.1 |
| Independent | Decima Francis | 93 | 0.2 | New |
| Independent | Steven Robbins | 87 | 0.2 | New |
| No description | Patricia Knox | 82 | 0.2 | New |
| Alliance for Workers' Liberty | Jill Mountford | 75 | 0.2 | New |
| Majority | | 17,187 | 36.8 | –9.7 |
| Turnout | | 46,659 | 59.3 | +7.3 |
| Registered electors | | 78,627 | | |
| Labour hold | | Swing | –3.0 | |

=== Elections in the 2000s ===
General election 2005: Camberwell and Peckham
| Party | Candidate | Votes | % | ±% |
|---|---|---|---|---|
| Labour | Harriet Harman | 18,933 | 65.3 | –4.3 |
| Liberal Democrats | Richard J. Porter | 5,450 | 18.8 | +5.5 |
| Conservative | Jessica Lee | 2,841 | 9.8 | –1.1 |
| Green | Paul M. Ingram | 1,172 | 4.0 | +0.8 |
| UKIP | Derek Penhallow | 350 | 1.2 | New |
| Socialist Labour | Margaret M. Sharkey | 132 | 0.5 | –0.2 |
| Workers Revolutionary | Sanjay M. Kulkarni | 113 | 0.4 | +0.1 |
| Majority | | 13,483 | 46.5 | –9.8 |
| Turnout | | 28,991 | 52.0 | +5.2 |
| Registered electors | | 57,079 | | |
| Labour hold | | Swing | –4.9 | |

General election 2001: Camberwell and Peckham
| Party | Candidate | Votes | % | ±% |
|---|---|---|---|---|
| Labour | Harriet Harman | 17,473 | 69.6 | +0.1 |
| Liberal Democrats | Donnachadh McCarthy | 3,350 | 13.3 | +2.1 |
| Conservative | Jonathan Morgan | 2,740 | 10.9 | –0.7 |
| Green | Störm Poorun | 805 | 3.2 | New |
| Socialist Alliance | John Mulrenan | 478 | 1.9 | New |
| Socialist Labour | Robert Adams | 188 | 0.7 | –1.7 |
| Workers Revolutionary | Frank Sweeney | 70 | 0.3 | –0.1 |
| Majority | | 14,123 | 56.3 | –1.6 |
| Turnout | | 25,104 | 46.8 | –8.5 |
| Registered electors | | 53,687 | | |
| Labour hold | | Swing | –1.0 | |

=== Elections in the 1990s ===
General election 1997: Camberwell and Peckham
| Party | Candidate | Votes | % | ±% |
|---|---|---|---|---|
| Labour | Harriet Harman | 19,734 | 69.5 | |
| Conservative | Kim Humphreys | 3,283 | 11.6 | |
| Liberal Democrats | Nigel P. Williams | 3,198 | 11.2 | |
| Referendum | Nicholas A. China | 692 | 2.4 | |
| Socialist Labour | Angela M. Ruddock | 685 | 2.4 | |
| Liberal | Gerry A. Williams | 443 | 1.6 | |
| Socialist | Joan Barker | 233 | 0.8 | |
| Workers Revolutionary | Christopher Eames | 106 | 0.4 | |
| Majority | | 16,451 | 57.9 | |
| Turnout | | 28,374 | 55.3 | |
| Registered electors | | 51,313 | | |
| Labour win (new seat) | | | | |

== See also ==
- List of parliamentary constituencies in London
- Southwark local elections

== Notes ==
Parliament of the United Kingdom
| Preceded by Witney | Constituency represented by the leader of the opposition 11 May – 25 September 2010 | Succeeded by Doncaster North |
| Preceded by Doncaster North | Constituency represented by the leader of the opposition 8 May – 12 September 2015 | Succeeded by Islington North |
