= Dulwich (London County Council constituency) =

London County Council constituency

- Former constituency for the London County Council

Former constituency
- Created: 1889
- Abolished: 1965
- Member(s): 2 (to 1949); 3 (from 1949)

Dulwich was a constituency used for elections to the London County Council between 1889 and the council's abolition, in 1965. The seat shared boundaries with the UK Parliament constituency of the same name.

== Councillors ==
Year	Name	Party	Name	Party	Name	Party
1889	William Mitchell Acworth	Moderate	Harry James Powell	Moderate	Two seats until 1949	
1892	William Matthews	Moderate	Harry James Powell	Moderate	Two seats until 1949	
1895	William Matthews	Moderate	Richard William Evelyn Middleton	Moderate	Two seats until 1949	
1899	John Ratcliffe Cousins	Moderate	Bryce Grant	Moderate	Two seats until 1949	
1901	John Ratcliffe Cousins	Moderate	George Hardy	Progressive	Two seats until 1949	
1904	Thomas Gautrey	Progressive	George Hardy	Progressive	Two seats until 1949	
1907	Henry Gooch	Municipal Reform	Frederick Hall	Municipal Reform	Two seats until 1949	
1910	Arthur Griffith-Boscawen	Municipal Reform	Frederick Hall	Municipal Reform	Two seats until 1949	
1913	Algernon Skeffington	Municipal Reform	Cuthbert Wilkinson	Municipal Reform	Two seats until 1949	
1918	Algernon Skeffington	Municipal Reform	Henry Newton Knights	Municipal Reform	Two seats until 1949	
1919	Francis Fremantle	Municipal Reform	Henry Gooch	Municipal Reform	Two seats until 1949	
1922	George Swinton	Municipal Reform	Henry Gooch	Municipal Reform	Two seats until 1949	
1928	Henry Alfred Wilmot	Municipal Reform	Henry Gooch	Municipal Reform	Two seats until 1949	
1934	Frederick Charles Eaton	Municipal Reform	William Hall Hickin	Municipal Reform	Two seats until 1949	
1937	Frederick Charles Eaton	Municipal Reform	Dudley Ryder	Municipal Reform	Two seats until 1949	
1938	Charles Pearce	Municipal Reform	Dudley Ryder	Municipal Reform	Two seats until 1949	
1940	Charles Pearce	Municipal Reform	Frank Griffiths Woollard	Municipal Reform	Two seats until 1949	
1949	Charles Pearce	Municipal Reform	Alida Brittain	Conservative	Ronald Hensman	Conservative
1952	Charles Pearce	Municipal Reform	Amy Crossman	Labour	Wilfrid Vernon	Labour
1955	Charles Pearce	Municipal Reform	Ronald Hensman	Conservative	Martin Stevens	Conservative
1958	Harry Lamborn	Labour	Albert Murray	Labour	Edgar Ernest Reed	Labour

== Election results ==
1889 London County Council election: Dulwich
Party	Candidate	Votes	%	±%
Moderate	William Mitchell Acworth	2,222		
Moderate	Harry James Powell	2,151		
Progressive	William Mansfield	1,810		
Progressive	Richard Sandon Gutteridge	1,622		
Conservative	William Matthews	1,400		
Liberal Unionist	Horatio Nelson Hardy	125		
Independent	Alfred Watson	88		
Moderate win (new seat)				
Moderate win (new seat)				

1892 London County Council election: Dulwich
Party	Candidate	Votes	%	±%
Moderate	Harry James Powell	3,407		
Moderate	William Matthews	3,391		
Progressive	Joseph Davis	2,062		
Progressive	Edward F. Craig	1,999		
Moderate hold		Swing		
Moderate hold		Swing		

1895 London County Council election: Dulwich
Party	Candidate	Votes	%	±%
Moderate	William Matthews	3,443		
Moderate	Richard William Evelyn Middleton	3,424		
Progressive	H. E. Ramsey	2,463		
Progressive	W. Street	2,438		
Moderate hold		Swing		
Moderate hold		Swing		

1898 London County Council election: Dulwich
Party	Candidate	Votes	%	±%
Moderate	William Matthews	3,698		
Moderate	Richard William Evelyn Middleton	3,673		
Progressive	George Hardy	2,461		
Progressive	H. E. Ramsey	2,447		
Moderate hold		Swing		
Moderate hold		Swing		

1901 London County Council election: Dulwich
Party	Candidate	Votes	%	±%
Progressive	George Hardy	3,312	39.7	+14.7
Conservative	John Ratcliffe Cousins	2,587	31.0	−6.6
Conservative	James Alfred Thornhill	2,442	29.3	−8.1
Progressive gain from Conservative		Swing	+11.0	
Conservative hold		Swing		

1904 London County Council election: Dulwich
Party	Candidate	Votes	%	±%
Progressive	George Hardy	4,347		
Progressive	Thomas Gautrey	4,275		
Conservative	W. Lane Mitchell	3,548		
Conservative	Henry Gooch	3,531		
Progressive hold		Swing		
Progressive gain from Conservative		Swing		

1907 London County Council election: Dulwich
Party	Candidate	Votes	%	±%
Municipal Reform	Henry Gooch	6,689		
Municipal Reform	Frederick Hall	6,641		
Progressive	George Hardy	5,020		
Progressive	A. Cohn	4,844		
Majority		1,669		
Municipal Reform gain from Progressive		Swing		
Municipal Reform gain from Progressive		Swing		

1910 London County Council election: Dulwich
Party	Candidate	Votes	%	±%
Municipal Reform	Frederick Hall	5,836	30.1	
Municipal Reform	Arthur Griffith-Boscawen	5,786	29.9	
Progressive	Arthur John Waldron	3,872	20.0	
Progressive	J. E. Boon	3,871	20.0	
Majority		1,914	9.9	
Municipal Reform hold		Swing		
Municipal Reform hold		Swing		

1913 London County Council election: Dulwich
Party	Candidate	Votes	%	±%
Municipal Reform	Algernon Skeffington	6,048	30.1	0.0
Municipal Reform	Cuthbert Wilkinson	6,027	29.9	0.0
Progressive	Percy Phipps	4,057	20.2	+0.2
Progressive	Sophia Jevons	3,993	19.8	−0.2
Majority		1,970	9.7	−0.2
Municipal Reform hold		Swing	-0.1	
Municipal Reform hold		Swing		

1919 London County Council election: Dulwich
Party	Candidate	Votes	%	±%
Municipal Reform	Henry Gooch	Unopposed	n/a	n/a
Municipal Reform	Francis Fremantle	Unopposed	n/a	n/a
Municipal Reform hold		Swing	n/a	
Municipal Reform hold		Swing	n/a	

1922 London County Council election: Dulwich
Party	Candidate	Votes	%	±%
Municipal Reform	Henry Gooch	9,545		n/a
Municipal Reform	George Swinton	9,364		n/a
Labour	H. Luckhart	2,398		n/a
Labour	T. E. Wright	2,374		n/a
Majority				n/a
Municipal Reform hold		Swing	n/a	
Municipal Reform hold		Swing	n/a	

1925 London County Council election: Dulwich
Party	Candidate	Votes	%	±%
Municipal Reform	Henry Gooch	7,694		
Municipal Reform	George Swinton	7,547		
Labour	F. G. Dawson	2,857		
Labour	T. E. Wright	2,792		
Majority				
Municipal Reform hold		Swing		
Municipal Reform hold		Swing		

1928 London County Council election: Dulwich
Party	Candidate	Votes	%	±%
Municipal Reform	Henry Gooch	7,589		
Municipal Reform	Henry Alfred Wilmot	7,506		
Labour	J. W. F. Lucas	2,518		
Labour	A. J. Anstey	2,503		
Liberal	A. M. Hewitt	2,030		
Liberal	S. W. Rowland	2,026		
Majority				
Municipal Reform hold		Swing		
Municipal Reform hold		Swing		

1931 London County Council election: Dulwich
Party	Candidate	Votes	%	±%
Municipal Reform	Henry Gooch	6,749		
Municipal Reform	Henry Alfred Wilmot	6,713		
Labour	Blance Radley	1,613		
Labour	Amy Sayle	1,604		
Liberal	David William Alun Llewellyn	931		
Liberal	S. W. Rowland	904		
Majority				
Municipal Reform hold		Swing		
Municipal Reform hold		Swing		

1934 London County Council election: Dulwich
Party	Candidate	Votes	%	±%
Municipal Reform	Frederick Charles Eaton	6,641		
Municipal Reform	William Hall Hickin	6,623		
Labour	E. J. Wood	2,340		
Labour	B. E. Websdale Radley	2,221		
Liberal	S. W. Rowland	1,176		
Liberal	David William Alun Llewellyn	972		
Majority				
Municipal Reform hold		Swing		
Municipal Reform hold		Swing		

1937 London County Council election: Dulwich
Party	Candidate	Votes	%	±%
Municipal Reform	Frederick Charles Eaton	8,610		
Municipal Reform	Dudley Ryder	8,496		
Labour	J. W. Fidler	3,652		
Labour	Caroline Maule	3,641		
Liberal	F. J. E. Butcher	900		
Liberal	Elisabeth Edwardes	809		
Majority				
Municipal Reform hold		Swing		
Municipal Reform hold		Swing		

1946 London County Council election: Dulwich
Party	Candidate	Votes	%	±%
Municipal Reform	Frank Griffiths Woollard	6,581		
Municipal Reform	Charles Pearce	6,565		
Labour	G. Williams	5,373		
Labour	H. T. Lennard	5,344		
Liberal	F. J. E. Butcher	900		
Liberal	Elisabeth Edwardes	809		
Majority				
Municipal Reform hold		Swing		
Municipal Reform hold		Swing		

1949 London County Council election: Dulwich
Party	Candidate	Votes	%	±%
Conservative	Alida Brittain	16,128		
Conservative	Ronald Hensman	16,000		
Conservative	Charles Pearce	15,558		
Labour	Amy Crossman	13,410		
Labour	H. T. Lennard	12,529		
Labour	M. F. Lucas	12,346		
Municipal Reform hold		Swing		
Municipal Reform hold		Swing		
Municipal Reform win (new seat)				

1952 London County Council election: Dulwich
Party	Candidate	Votes	%	±%
Labour	Wilfrid Vernon	18,204		
Conservative	Charles Pearce	16,747		
Labour	Amy Crossman	16,661		
Conservative	I. J. Hutchinson	16,624		
Labour	Olive Deer	16,593		
Conservative	Ronald Hensman	16,587		
Labour gain from Conservative		Swing		
Labour gain from Conservative		Swing		
Conservative hold		Swing		

1955 London County Council election: Dulwich
Party	Candidate	Votes	%	±%
Conservative	Ronald Hensman	15,276		
Conservative	Charles Pearce	15,229		
Conservative	Martin Stevens	14,864		
Labour	Wilfrid Vernon	13,156		
Labour	Amy Crossman	12,764		
Labour	Edgar Ernest Reed	12,744		
Conservative gain from Labour		Swing		
Conservative gain from Labour		Swing		
Conservative hold		Swing		

1958 London County Council election: Dulwich
Party	Candidate	Votes	%	±%
Labour	Harry Lamborn	15,770		
Labour	Albert Murray	15,650		
Labour	Edgar Ernest Reed	15,550		
Conservative	Charles Pearce	10,675		
Conservative	J. H. Allason	10,350		
Conservative	Martin Stevens	10,326		
Labour gain from Conservative		Swing		
Labour gain from Conservative		Swing		
Labour gain from Conservative		Swing		

1961 London County Council election: Dulwich
Party	Candidate	Votes	%	±%
Labour	Harry Lamborn	13,846		
Labour	Albert Murray	13,588		
Labour	Edgar Ernest Reed	13,405		
Conservative	Charles Pearce	12,943		
Conservative	H. Day	12,725		
Conservative	Martin Stevens	12,607		
Liberal	G. Searle	3,603		
Liberal	P. T. Snasdell	3,394		
Liberal	G. H. Brown	3,303		
Labour hold		Swing		
Labour hold		Swing		
Labour hold		Swing		
