= Bagpath =

Hamlet in Gloucestershire, England

Coordinates: 51.652°N 2.273°W

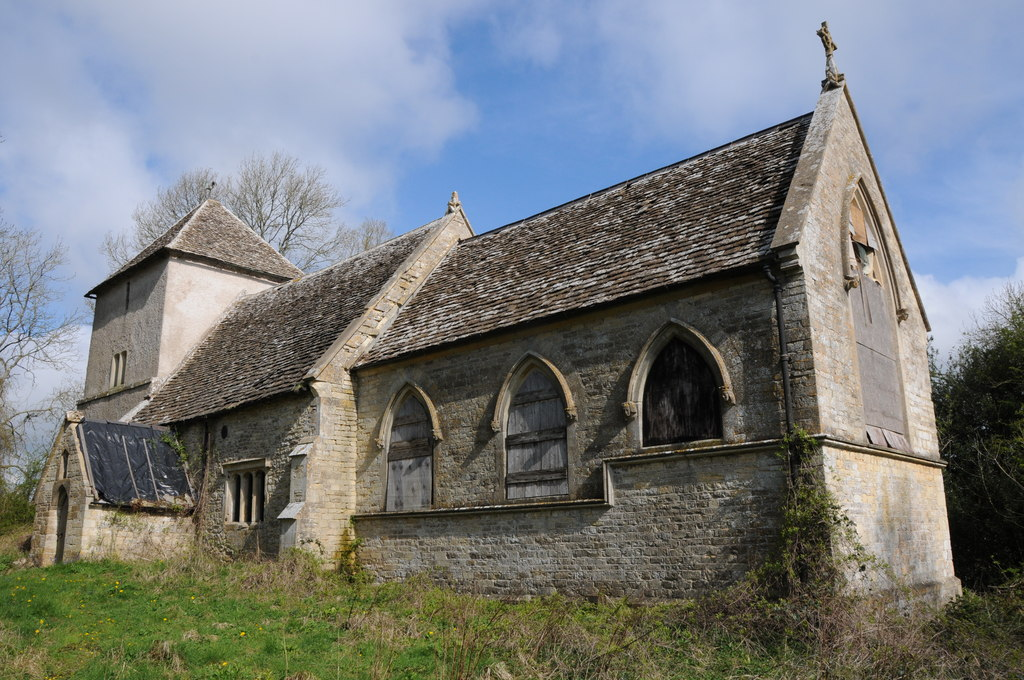
- Newington Bagpath church

- Location within Gloucestershire
- Population: 100
- OS grid reference: ST8094
- Civil parish: Kingscote
- District: Cotswold District
- Shire county: Gloucestershire
- Region: South West
- Country: England
- Sovereign state: United Kingdom
- Post town: Tetbury
- Dialling code: 01453
- Police: Gloucestershire
- Fire: Gloucestershire
- Ambulance: South Western
- UK Parliament: South Cotswolds

Bagpath is a hamlet in Gloucestershire, England, in the Ozleworth valley south of the village of Kingscote and forming part of Kingscote civil parish. The hamlet consists of two separate settlements of Bagpath and Newington Bagpath, although residents of Newington Bagpath refer to their settlement solely as Newington.

The hamlet is sparsely populated with a population of about 100, and a small number of farms. Almost all of the area is pasture or woodland.

The hamlet falls under the authority of Cotswold District Council and is represented in Parliament by Roz Savage, Liberal Democrat MP for South Cotswolds.

== History ==
A variation in spelling "Neunton & Pagpath" appears in 1418, when William Stoke was the parson of the church.

Although the population is now only about 100, census records from the 1900s show it was once about 1,000. The parish had its own church and school, but the former school house is now a private home and, although in private ownership, the church is now abandoned. The parish of St Bartholomew was united with the neighbouring parish of Owlpen from medieval times to the late 19th century. The west tower is Norman work and the nave is medieval, with a chancel added by Samuel Sanders Teulon in 1858. The church was declared redundant in about 1973.

Near the church is the site of a motte-and-bailey castle dating to the Norman era. The earthworks have an overall diameter of 150 ft. The mound rises to 4 ft above ground level and is surrounded by a ditch 5 ft below which fades out on the scarp side. There were indications of an entrance ramp on the north side. A pit dug into the top displayed rubble and possible vaulting. There is a rectangular building platform immediately to the north of the motte.

The Revd Alan Gardner Cornwall of Ashcroft was rector of Bagpath in the early nineteenth century, and published a standard account of life in this rural area at that time. His sons, Clement Francis Cornwall and Henry Pennant Cornwall emigrated to British Columbia, Canada while it was still a British colony during the gold rush. There they established a ranch and constructed a 'stopping house', Ashcroft Manor, on the Cariboo Gold Trail above the later site of the small town of Ashcroft, British Columbia, built for travellers in search of gold, giving them a place to stay and stable their horses. Photographs and maps of Bagpath and the surrounding area are held in the town's museum.

The nearby Monarch's Way long-distance footpath is based on the route taken by King Charles II of England whilst on the run after defeat at the Battle of Worcester.

In 2003 the local community successfully opposed a PPG7 planning application for a large country house in the valley, which they argued would spoil the unique countryside in the area. Since then a number of community events have taken place, including what are intended to become annual events: the Bagpath street party and a fireworks display for local residents.
