= Collingwood Hughes =

Collingwood James Hughes (31 January 1872 – 25 March 1963) was a British Conservative Party politician.

== Early life ==
Born in New Brompton, Chatham, Kent, Hughes was the son of William Collingwood Hughes, a clerk at Chatham Dockyard, and his wife Fanny Agnes Fynmore, a daughter of a Royal Marines officer. He was educated at Plymouth Grammar School and King's College London. In 1899 he married Lilian Crocker of Plymouth, with whom he had two daughters.

He moved to Cape Colony, where he was principal of the Civil Service College, Cape Town 1901–1909 and private political secretary to businessman and politician Abe Bailey from 1909 – 1910. He was also a political organiser with the British Empire League and a lecturer at the Cape Town Branch of the Navy League. In 1905 he joined the part-time Royal Naval Volunteer Reserve where he served as a paymaster until 1909.

With the outbreak of the First World War in the summer of 1914, Hughes enlisted in the South West African Expeditionary Force in 1914. In 1915 he rejoined the Royal Naval Volunteer Reserve where he reached the rank of Paymaster Lieutenant Commander by the end of the war.

== Politics ==
Hughes returned to the United Kingdom, unsuccessfully contesting the south London constituency of Peckham at the 1918 general election as an independent candidate. He became a lecturer with the publicity department of the Daily Mail in 1922. Hughes joined the Conservative Party, and contested the 1922 general election, and succeeded in winning the Peckham seat for the party. He held the seat when a further general election was held in 1923, and became the parliamentary chairman of the Entertainment Tax Abolition League.

In October 1924 a vote of censure in the House of Commons led to the fall of the First Labour Government. However, Hughes surprised his party colleagues by voting with the government. He later explained his actions:

"I listened with great interest to the statements made by each of these right honourable gentleman (Ramsay MacDonald and Sir Patrick Hastings), and I considered these statements perfectly fair, candid, unequivocal and illuminating. I accepted them in their entirety, as coming not only from two right honourable members of the House of Commons in their personal capacity, but from two gentlemen holding the high and responsible offices of Prime Minister and Attorney General of the realm of Great Britain."

"If ever the time arrives when the considered statements, made under such grave circumstances, of two gentlemen holding such exalted offices must be doubted, then is this country the end of all political honour and integrity is at hand."

"By accepting the statements and voting with the government I claim to have acted in the highest national interest, instead of surbordinating those interests to what, on this occasion, I consider to be contemptible party tactics."

Following the fall of the government, a general election was called, but Hughes did not defend his seat. In March 1925 he contested the London County Council elections as an independent, but was not elected.

== Later life ==
In June 1925 he was declared bankrupt, emerging from the bankruptcy in August 1927.

In August 1929 Hughes was involved in a major controversy whilst a passenger on board the liner S S Bendigo sailing from Cape Town to Perth, Western Australia. The ship carried large numbers of emigrants travelling from the United Kingdom and Ireland to Australia. Hughes made highly disparaging comments about the quality and character of the emigrants, which were published in the press. He described his fellow passengers as: "...degenerates of the worst type of Irish, Scottish and Welsh. There did not appear to be many English; at least they did not speak the English language." They were "no credit to Great Britain and no acquisition to Australia, which should slam the door in their faces." He described some of the male passengers as "on the verge of imbecility" and others as "street-corner loafers". Four hundred emigrants formed a committee and passed a resolution demanding that Hughes leave the ship. The authorities at Australia House in London rejected the claims. Due to the anger of the passengers Hughes was placed under the protection of armed guards, eventually issuing a written apology.

From 1942 to 1943 Hughes was the manager of the Daily Express Centre of Public Opinion (a polling organisation), and from 1943 to 1945 he was general secretary of the Council of Retail Distributors.

He died in March 1963 aged 91.

Parliament of the United Kingdom
Preceded by Albion Henry Herbert Richardson	Member of Parliament for Peckham; 1922–1924	Succeeded by Hugh Dalton
