= 1972 Southwark by-election =

UK parliamentary by-election

The 1972 Southwark by-election was a by-election held on 4 May 1972 for the British House of Commons constituency of Southwark. The by-election was triggered by the resignation of the serving Labour Party Member of Parliament (MP), Ray Gunter.

The election was won by Harry Lamborn of the Labour Party.

== Candidates ==
The Labour candidate was Harry Lamborn, who represented the constituency on the Greater London Council, of which he was Deputy Chair. The Conservative candidate was Jeffrey Gordon.

Gunter, who had resigned over the issue of the Common Market, had had a majority of nearly 10,000 and the seat was expected to remain a Labour one. Lamborn was described as 'a fervent anti-marketeer'. His main platform was opposition to the Government's Housing Finance Bill, which was expected to raise rents for council tenants. The constituency was reported as having more rented accommodation than any other in the country. The third candidate was an independent, Brian McDermott, who stood as the Actors Anti-Heath's Union-Bashing Tactics candidate.

== Polling ==
Polling took place on the same day as the local elections outside London, in which Labour made very large gains. Labour won the seat comfortably with a swing of 11 per cent. The Conservatives took some comfort from the fact that in the by-election for the safe Kingston-upon-Thames seat the same day, they retained it against only a small swing to Labour.

== Result ==
Southwark by-election, 1972
Party	Candidate	Votes	%	±%
Labour	Harry Lamborn	12,108	79.33	+12.00
Conservative	Jeffrey Gordon	2,756	18.06	−10.10
Independent	Brian McDermott	398	2.61	New
Majority		9,352	61.27	+22.10
Turnout		15,262		
Labour hold		Swing		

== See also ==
- List of United Kingdom by-elections
- Southwark constituency
