= Harry Lamborn =

British politician

Harry Lamborn MP

Member of Parliament for Peckham (1974–1982) Southwark (1972–1974)
- In office 4 May 1972 – 21 August 1982
- Preceded by: Ray Gunter
- Succeeded by: Harriet Harman

Member of the Greater London Council
- In office 1 April 1965 – 1972
- Preceded by: Office established
- Constituency: Southwark

Member of the London County Council
- In office 1953 – 1 April 1965
- Succeeded by: Office abolished
- Constituency: Dulwich

Personal details
- Born: Harry George Lamborn; 1 May 1915 London, England
- Died: 21 August 1982 (aged 67) Eastbourne, England
- Party: Labour
- Spouse: Lilian Smith (m. 1938)
- Children: 3

Harry George Lamborn (1 May 1915 – 21 August 1982) was a British Labour Party politician. He was a councillor from 1953, then a Member of Parliament (MP) from 1972 until his death in 1982.

== Early political life ==
Lamborn was born in Dulwich. He was a member of Camberwell Borough Council from 1953 to 1965, including being mayor in 1963/4. He represented the Dulwich constituency on the London County Council between 1958 and 1965. Lamborn was elected in 1964 to the LCC's successor body, the Greater London Council, for the constituency of Southwark, and was re-elected in 1967 and 1970. He was Deputy Chairman of the GLC from 1971 to 1972.

== Member of Parliament ==
After Ray Gunter resigned from the House of Commons, Lamborn was elected at a by-election in May 1972 for the constituency of Southwark. After his constituency was eliminated in boundary changes, he ran in the newly configured Peckham and was comfortably re-elected in the February 1974 general election, at which the Labour Party returned to office, albeit without a majority. He was Parliamentary Private Secretary (PPS) to the Chancellor of the Exchequer, Denis Healey, from 1974 to 1979.

At the general election of 1979 the Labour Government was defeated, and a Conservative Party Government was elected under Margaret Thatcher. Lamborn was comfortably re-elected but with a reduced majority. Afterward, he announced he would not contend the next general election on health grounds.

== Personal life and death ==
Lamborn married Lilian Ruth Smith in 1938, and they had three children. He died at a hospital in Eastbourne on 21 August 1982, and was succeeded as MP for Peckham by Harriet Harman in a by-election later that year.

His name is memorialized in that of Harry Lamborn House, a block of sheltered flats for the elderly built by Southwark Council on Gervase Street, off the Old Kent Road in Peckham.

Parliament of the United Kingdom
Preceded by Ray Gunter	Member of Parliament for Southwark; 1972–Feb 1974	Constituency abolished
Preceded by Freda Corbet	Member of Parliament for Peckham; Feb 1974–1982	Succeeded by Harriet Harman
