= Yoruba Party =

Yoruba Party in the UK Egbe Yoruba ni Ilu Oyinbo
- Abbreviation: YPUK
- Leader: Olusola Oni
- Founded: 13 February 2024
- Ideology: Yoruba diaspora interests
- House of Commons: 0 / 650

Party flag

Website
- yorubapartyuk.org

The Yoruba Party in the UK (abbreviated to Yoruba Party) is a minor political party in the United Kingdom. The aim of the party is "empowering the Yoruba voice in British politics".

They stood one candidate in the 2024 United Kingdom general election in the seat of Peckham.

Olusola Oni described his main reason for founding the party is "to protect the interests of the Yorubas in the constituency."

== Election results ==
General Elections
Year	Constituency	Candidates	Votes	%	Position
2024	Peckham	Olusola Oni	261	0.7	9th of 10
