= Baron Silkin =

Barony in the Peerage of the United Kingdom

Barony of Silkin
- Creation date: 14 July 1950
- Created by: King George VI
- Peerage: Peerage of the United Kingdom
- First holder: Lewis Silkin, 1st Baron Silkin
- Remainder to: Heirs male of the body lawfully begotten
- Status: Disclaimed

Baron Silkin, of Dulwich in the County of London, is a title in the Peerage of the United Kingdom. It was created on 4 July 1950 for the solicitor and Labour politician Lewis Silkin. The peerage was disclaimed by both his eldest son, the second Baron, and the latter's nephew, the third Baron. When the third Baron disclaimed the title in 2002, the barony of Silkin became the first peerage ever to be disclaimed twice; and the only disclaimer since the House of Lords Act 1999 (which excluded hereditary peers from automatically sitting in the House of Lords and thereby made such peers eligible to sit in the Commons, the main purpose for the 1963 Act.)

Samuel Silkin, Baron Silkin of Dulwich and John Silkin, younger sons of the first Baron, were also prominent Labour politicians. Lord Silkin of Dulwich was the father of Christopher Silkin, disclaimed third Baron Silkin.

== Barons Silkin (1950) ==
- Lewis Silkin, 1st Baron Silkin (1889–1972)
- Arthur Silkin, 2nd Baron Silkin (1916–2001) (disclaimed 1972)
- Christopher Lewis Silkin, 3rd Baron Silkin (b. 1947) (disclaimed 2002)

The heir presumptive and sole heir to the peerage is the former 3rd baron's first cousin Rory Lewis Silkin (b. 1954)

== Line of Succession ==
- Lewis Silkin, 1st Baron Silkin, PC, CH (1889–1972)
  - Samuel Charles Silkin, Baron Silkin of Dulwich, PC, QC (1918–1988)
    - Christopher Lewis Silkin (born 1947) [briefly 3rd Baron Silkin]
  - Rt. Hon. John Silkin, M.P. (1923–1987)
    - (1) Rory Lewis F. Silkin (b. 1954)
