= Arthur A. Baumann =

Arthur Anthony Baumann (9 January 1856 – 20 June 1936) was a British lawyer, author, newspaper editor, businessman and Conservative Party politician.

== Career overview ==
Baumann was born in Glasgow, and was the second son of William Baumann, a merchant in the city. He was educated at Wellington College and Balliol College, Oxford, graduating 2nd Class in Classical Greats in 1879. While at university he was active in the Oxford Union, serving as president and treasurer and showing oratical and debating skills. He was called to the bar at the Inner Temple in 1881, and practiced at the Parliamentary Bar.

In 1885 Baumann was elected Member of Parliament for Peckham, and was re-elected when a further general election was held in 1886. At the next general election in 1892 he instead contested the seat of Salford North, but failed to be elected. He was described in his obituary in The Times as "not a success" in parliament.

He initially returned to his legal practice, but in 1895 changed career and entered business in the City of London as a director of a number of public companies. From 1917 to 1921 he was the editor of the Saturday Review.

He was known for his lively use of invective and his very Conservative views, a fact recalled on his death:

"Politically he never varied from his allegiance to the extreme Right, and in his books and articles, by which he is chiefly known to the public, he did not spare his chiefs whenever they strayed from the true faith of Conservatism as he understood it."

Baumann never married, and died at the age of 80. He was cremated at Golders Green Crematorium.

== Works ==
- (1893). Betterment, Being the Law of Special Assessment for Benefits in America, Edward Arnold.
- (1905). Contributed a memoir of his friend, the writer and poet, Armine Kent, in Otia: Poems, Essays and Reviews, Bodley Head
- (1916). Persons and Politics of the Transition, Macmillan & Co.
- (1927). The Last Victorians, J. B. Lippincott Company.
- (1930). Burke: the Founder of Conservatism, Eyre and Spottiswoode.
- (1936). Personalities; a selection from the writings of A. A. Baumann, edited by Humbert Wolfe, Macmillan & Co.

Parliament of the United Kingdom
New constituency	Member of Parliament for Peckham; 1885 – 1892	Succeeded by Sir Frederick Banbury
