= Charles Goddard Clarke =

British businessman and Liberal politician

Charles Goddard Clarke (10 May 1849 – 7 March 1908) was a British businessman and Liberal politician.

The son of Richard Clarke and his wife Mary née Millard, he was educated in Liverpool. He left school early, entering employment with a relative. In 1873 he married Rebecca Potter and in 1875 became a partner in Potter & Clarke Limited, wholesale druggists, of Artillery Lane, London. He lived in the Peckham area of South London, and was a member of the Coopers Company of the City of London. A Baptist, he was a member of the Metropolitan Tabernacle.

At the 1895 general election he unsuccessfully contested the constituency of Dulwich for the Liberal Party. In 1898 he was elected to the London County Council as a member of the Liberal-backed Progressive Party majority group, representing Peckham. He was re-elected in 1901 and 1904.

In 1900 he was once more a Liberal parliamentary candidate, standing at Mile End, but again without success. With the creation of the Metropolitan Borough of Camberwell in 1900, Clarke was made an alderman on the borough council, and was mayor of Camberwell in 1902–1903.

The 1906 general election was Clarke's third attempt to enter the Commons, and he was chosen to contest the constituency of Peckham. There was a large swing to the Liberals, and he won the seat, defeating the sitting Conservative Member of Parliament Sir Frederick Banbury. Although not formally a member of the Liberal-Labour group, he was described by The Times as "an addition to the Labour group of members".

Early in 1908 Clarke became ill, and died of pneumonia at his home at Champion Hill in March, aged 68. He was buried at Nunhead Cemetery.

Parliament of the United Kingdom
Preceded by Sir Frederick Banbury	Member of Parliament for Peckham; 1906–1908	Succeeded by Henry Gooch
Civic offices
Preceded by William Scott Scott	Mayor of Camberwell; 1902–1903	Succeeded by Henry Robert Taylor
