= Ray Gunter =

British politician (1909–1977)

The Right Honourable Ray Gunter

Minister of Power
- In office 6 April 1968 – 1 July 1968
- Prime Minister: Harold Wilson
- Preceded by: Richard Marsh
- Succeeded by: Roy Mason

Minister of Labour
- In office 18 October 1964 – 6 April 1968
- Prime Minister: Harold Wilson
- Preceded by: Joseph Godber
- Succeeded by: Barbara Castle

Shadow Minister for Labour
- In office 6 December 1961 – 18 October 1964
- Leader: Hugh Gaitskell; George Brown; Harold Wilson
- Preceded by: Frederick Lee
- Succeeded by: Joseph Godber

Shadow Minister for Power
- In office November 1960 – 6 December 1961
- Leader: Hugh Gaitskell
- Preceded by: Frederick Lee
- Succeeded by: Tom Fraser

Member of Parliament for Southwark
- In office 8 October 1959 – 30 March 1972
- Preceded by: George Isaacs
- Succeeded by: Harry Lamborn

Member of Parliament for Doncaster
- In office 23 February 1950 – 25 October 1951
- Preceded by: Evelyn Walkden
- Succeeded by: Anthony Barber

Member of Parliament for South East Essex
- In office 5 July 1945 – 23 February 1950
- Preceded by: Victor Raikes
- Succeeded by: Bernard Braine

Personal details
- Born: Raymond Jones Gunter; 30 August 1909 Wales, UK
- Died: 12 April 1977 (aged 67)
- Party: Labour

Raymond Jones Gunter (30 August 1909 – 12 April 1977) was a British Labour Party politician. He was born in Wales and had a background in the railway industry and the British trade union movement – specifically his union, the Transport Salaried Staffs' Association (TSSA).

== Early political career ==
After seeing active service in the Second World War, enlisting in the Royal Engineers in 1941 and later being commissioned and reaching the rank of Captain, Gunter entered Parliament in the 1945 general election for the previously Conservative seat of South East Essex. He was a backbencher throughout the six-year Labour Government of Clement Attlee. The Labour Home Secretary, James Chuter Ede, presided over a redistribution of seats in the late 1940s; as a result of that, Gunter's Essex seat was broken up, so he switched to the seat of Doncaster in Yorkshire for the 1950 general election. But even at that election he won his seat by a majority of only 878 over his Conservative opponent, future Chancellor of the Exchequer Anthony Barber. Barber went on to unseat Gunter by 384 votes in the 1951 general election that saw the return of a Conservative Government under Winston Churchill.

== Rise to ministerial office ==
Gunter was associated with the right wing of the Labour Party and was a member of the Labour Party's National Executive Committee (NEC) from 1955 to 1966 and was president of his union, TSSA, 1956–64. When George Isaacs announced his decision, aged 76, not to stand for re-election in the strongly Labour constituency of Southwark in South London, Gunter secured the nomination in time for the 1959 general election. He was returned to the Commons as a TSSA-sponsored Member of Parliament, with a majority of 12,340.

Following Labour's heavy defeat in the 1959 election, its then leader, Hugh Gaitskell, sought to revise and moderate Labour's constitution – the so-called Clause IV dispute. The trade union leaders overwhelmingly disliked this shift and Gunter was one of the opponents. In 1963 Gaitskell died suddenly, the Clause IV conflict still unresolved. Harold Wilson was elected the new leader of the Labour Party, and Gunter continued to be a Labour shadow cabinet member.

== Minister of Labour ==
Labour narrowly won the 1964 general election and Harold Wilson made Gunter Minister of Labour. As Minister, Gunter faced a major dilemma: as a union leader he believed that trade unions should be able to negotiate responsible pay rates for their members through "free collective bargaining"; on the other hand, the wildcat strikes in some parts of British industry were often seen as damaging to the economy, and "wage restraint" was the alternative.

Soon after Labour's landslide victory at the 1966 general election, the seamen's strike was a particularly important factor in the conflict. On that issue, Gunter took the same tough line as Wilson. Looking back, he described his stint as Minister of Labour as a "bed of nails". He sought to complete his work by bringing in a new bill drawn from the findings of the Donovan Commission report on trade union power, but Wilson reshuffled him to the post of Minister for Power in April 1968.

Gunter was rumoured to have been the source of leaks to the media which put the cabinet in a negative light. In any event he resigned from government on 1 July, stating that he could no longer work in a Wilson government. Meanwhile, Gunter's successor in labour affairs, Barbara Castle, saw her proposals to reduce trade union powers in her 1969 white paper, 'In Place of Strife' fail in the teeth of concerted trade union opposition.

== Later political life and legacy ==
Gunter was re-elected in his Southwark constituency at the 1970 general election that saw the Labour government replaced by a Conservative one led by Edward Heath. He was by now a senior opposition backbencher and resigned from Parliament in 1972 and was succeeded by Harry Lamborn. Gunter died in 1977 and was buried at St. Mary's Old Church, St. Mary's on the Isles of Scilly. For many years he had a house on the Isles of Scilly, located in Launceston Close, Old Town, and called Y Bwythen Bach. His name lives on in a block of sheltered flats for the elderly built by Southwark Council in Walworth.

Parliament of the United Kingdom
Preceded by Victor Raikes	Member of Parliament for South East Essex; 1945–1950	Constituency abolished
Preceded by Evelyn Walkden	Member of Parliament for Doncaster; 1950–1951	Succeeded by Anthony Barber
Preceded by George Isaacs	Member of Parliament for Southwark; 1959–1972	Succeeded by Harry Lamborn
Party political offices
Preceded by Anthony Greenwood	Chair of the Labour Party National Executive Committee; 1964–1965	Succeeded by Walter Padley
Trade union offices
Preceded by James Haworth	President of the Transport Salaried Staffs' Association; 1956 – 1964	Succeeded by Tom Bradley
