= Albion Richardson =

British politician

Albion Richardson

Sir Albion Henry Herbert Richardson CBE MP (2 October 1874 – 7 July 1950) was a British barrister and Liberal Party politician.

The son of James Henry Richardson of Hendon, he was privately educated in France and Germany.

He worked as a lawyer, and became a partner in a London legal firm. In 1912 he was called to the bar at Gray's Inn. In the meantime he had entered politics, having been elected to the Commons as Member of Parliament for Peckham at the general election of December 1910, unseating the sitting Conservative MP.

During the First World War Richardson was appointed to a number of committees: he was chairman of the Appeal Tribunal for the County of London, and served on the Committee on the Employment of Aliens in Government Offices with Lord Justice Sir John Eldon Bankes and James Craig.

At the 1918 general election he was re-elected as Peckham's MP as a Coalition Liberal. In 1919 he was appointed by the Home Secretary to examine allegations of abuse of conscientious objectors by the Governor of Wandsworth Prison. He was subsequently appointed on a number of occasions to enquire into and report upon allegations against the police. In 1918 he was awarded the CBE and in 1919 was knighted. He stood down from parliament at the 1922 general election.

Richardson returned to his legal career, working mainly in the area of commercial law. In 1930 he "took silk" and became King's Counsel and was made a bencher of Gray's Inn. In 1931 was appointed Recorder of Warwick. In 1936 he became Recorder of Nottingham, an office he held until his death. He was elected Treasurer of Gray's Inn for 1944.

He died at his London home in July 1950 aged 75, and was cremated at Golders Green Crematorium.

== Arms ==
Coat of arms of Albion Richardson

Notes
Displayed on a painted panel in the hall at Gray's Inn.
Crest
A cubit arm habited Azure holding in the hand a sword proper pommel and hilt Or.
Escutcheon
Or on a fess Azure between in chief a bull’s head couped and in base a lymphad sail furled and oars crossed Sable flags and pennon to the sinister Gules a saltire Argent.
Motto
Virtute Aquiritur Honos

Parliament of the United Kingdom
Preceded by Henry Gooch	Member of Parliament for Camberwell, Peckham; 1910–1922	Succeeded by Collingwood Hughes
