= Lewis Silkin, 1st Baron Silkin =

British Labour Party politician

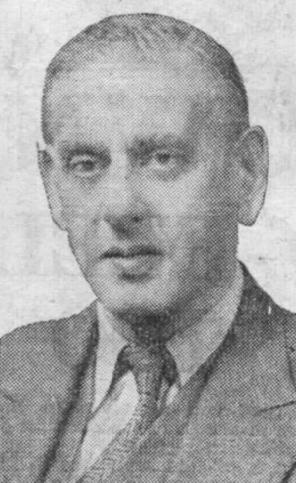
Silkin in 1945

Lewis Silkin, 1st Baron Silkin CH (14 November 1889 – 11 May 1972), was a British Labour Party politician.

== Career ==
Lewis Silkin was born on 14 November 1889 to Abraham and Fanny Silkin, who were Litvak Jews from what was then the Lithuanian part of the Russian Empire. His parents came to settle in the East End of London and were of modest means, Abraham cleaned the toilets of the Synagogue, gave Hebrew lessons and sold fruit off a barrow. Lewis had several siblings, including Joseph Silkin (father of the poet Jon Silkin) who he worked with as a solicitor and with whom he co-founded Silkin and Silkin. In 1950 he founded Lewis Silkin & Partners together with his son John. This is the London law firm where he practised and which still bears his name. He became a member of the London County Council in 1925. He chaired the LCC Town Planning and the Housing and Public Health Committees and was a member of the Central Housing Advisory Committee.

He was elected as Member of Parliament (MP) for Peckham in 1936, and was a member of the Select committee on National Expenditure. He was Minister of Town and Country Planning in the Government of Clement Attlee from 1945 until he retired in 1950. He appointed Clough Williams-Ellis as the first Chairman of the Stevenage Development Corporation in 1946, with Monica Felton as the first woman Deputy Chairman. (who then became the first female chairman between 1949 and 1951) and appointed Baroness Denington as the second female chairman of the same corporation in 1966.

== Global policy ==
He was one of the signatories of the agreement to convene a convention for drafting a world constitution. As a result, for the first time in human history, a World Constituent Assembly convened to draft and adopt the Constitution for the Federation of Earth.

== Honours ==
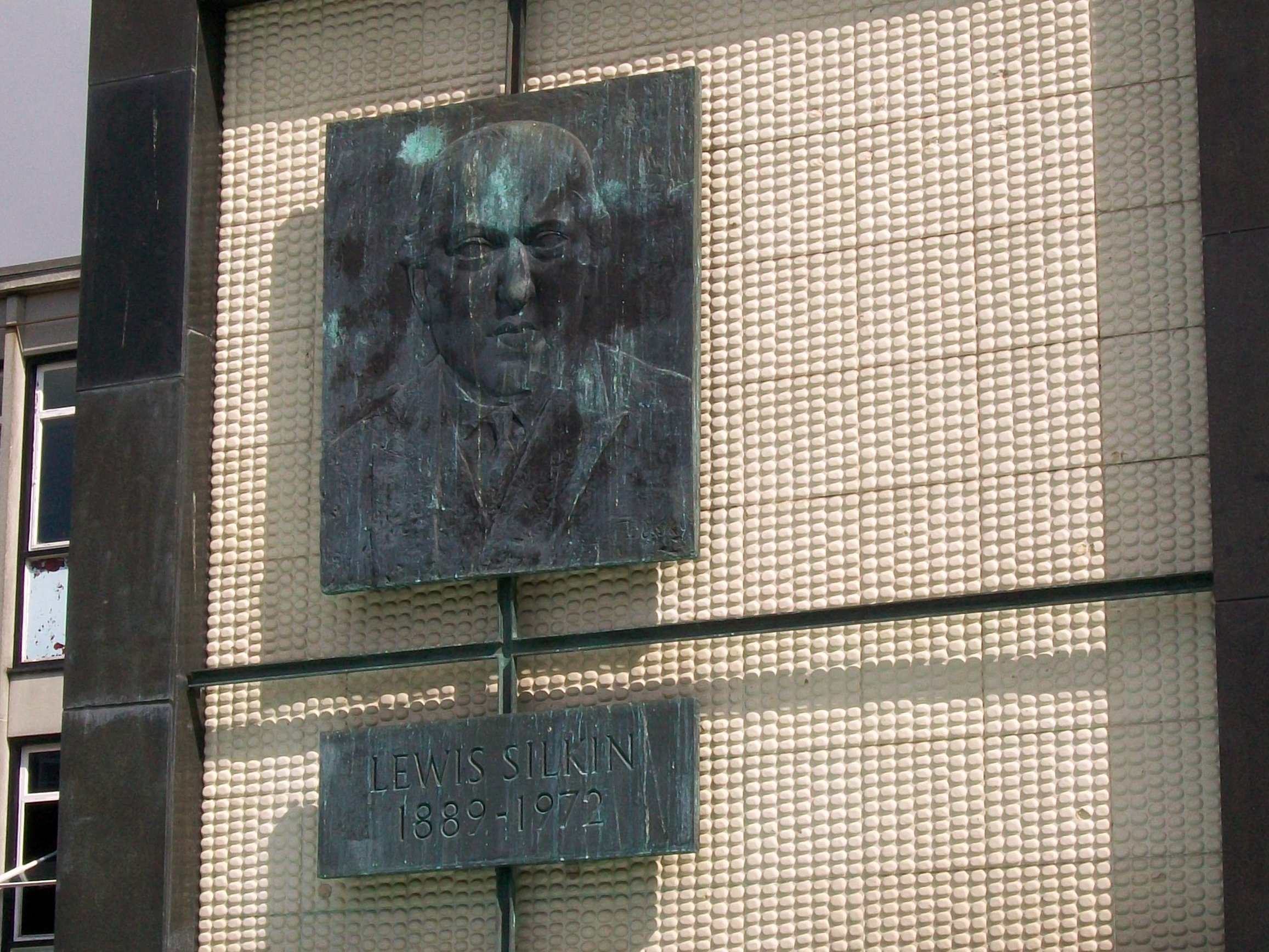
Sculpture by Franta Belsky on Stevenage Clock Tower

Silkin was raised to the peerage as Baron Silkin, of Dulwich in the County of London, in the 1950 Birthday Honours. He was further honoured in the 1965 New Year Honours when he was appointed a Member of the Order of the Companions of Honour (CH). Of his three sons, his eldest, Arthur, a civil servant, disclaimed the peerage. The other two, Samuel and John, both followed him into Parliament and became members of the Privy Council as well as Government Ministers. Although Samuel refused a knighthood as Attorney-General, he eventually became a life peer as Baron Silkin of Dulwich, of North Leigh in the County of Oxfordshire.

Samuel's son Christopher also disclaimed the hereditary peerage on the death of his uncle Arthur in 2001, the first time a peerage has been disclaimed twice.

== See also ==
- Lewis Silkin LLP
- Silkin Test

Parliament of the United Kingdom
Preceded by Viscount Borodale	Member of Parliament for Peckham; 1936–1950	Succeeded by Freda Kunzlen Corbet
Party political offices
Preceded by Cecil Manning	Leader of the Labour Party on London County Council; 1930–1933	Succeeded by Herbert Morrison
Political offices
Preceded by William Morrison	Minister of Town and Country Planning; 1945–1950	Succeeded by Hugh Dalton
Peerage of the United Kingdom
New creation	Baron Silkin; 1950–1972	Succeeded by Arthur Silkin
