= Our Currency, Our Country =

1996 book by John Redwood

Our Currency, Our Country: The Dangers of European Monetary Union
- Author: John Redwood
- Language: English
- Genre: Economics
- Publisher: Penguin Books
- Publication date: 1996
- Publication place: United Kingdom
- ISBN: 0-14-026523-6

Our Currency, Our Country: The Dangers of European Monetary Union is a 1996 book by British Conservative politician John Redwood. In the book, he argues that the European single currency would be a bad idea for the United Kingdom for political, economic and legal reasons.
