= The Death of Britain? =

1999 book by John Redwood

- Author: John Redwood
- Language: English
- Genre: Politics
- Publisher: Palgrave Macmillan
- Publication date: 1999
- Publication place: United Kingdom
- ISBN: 978-0-333-74438-3

The Death of Britain is a 1999 book by John Redwood in which he explores the constitutional crises facing Britain via reforms implemented by the incumbent Labour government, such as devolution and House of Lords reform.

== Editions ==
- Palgrave Macmillan, January 1999, ISBN 978-0-333-74438-3
- St. Martin's Press, July 1999, ISBN 978-0-312-22193-5
