= 1908 Peckham by-election =

UK parliamentary by-election

← 1906	24 March 1908	Jan. 1910 →

Candidate	Gooch	Gautrey
Party	Conservative	Liberal
Popular vote	6,970	4,476
Percentage	60.9%	39.1%
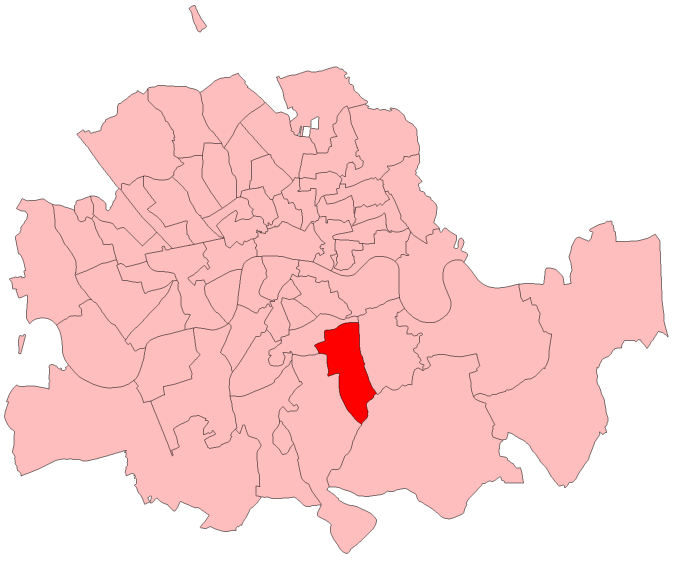
MP before election
Charles Clarke
Liberal
Subsequent MP
Henry Gooch
Conservative

The 1908 Peckham by-election was a parliamentary by-election held for the British House of Commons constituency of Peckham in the Metropolitan Borough of Camberwell, London on 24 March 1908. The seat was won by the opposition Conservative Party candidate, a gain from the Liberal Party who had won a large majority at the 1906 general election.

== Vacancy ==
The by-election was caused by the death of the sitting Liberal MP, Charles Clarke, on 7 March 1908. Clarke had won the seat from the Conservatives at the 1906 general election with a majority of 2,339 votes.

General election 1906: Camberwell, Peckham
Party	Candidate	Votes	%	±%
Liberal	Charles Clarke	5,903	62.4	21.7
Conservative	Frederick Banbury	3,564	37.6	−21.7
Majority		2,339	24.8	N/A
Turnout		12,401	76.3	+2.0
Liberal gain from Conservative		Swing	+21.7	

== Candidates ==
The Liberal Party were described as "quite unprepared" for the election, with no obvious candidate. A decision was taken not to consider the nomination until after Clarke's funeral. A special meeting of the Peckham Liberal, Radical and Progressive Association was held on 12 March, with the names of seven potential candidates for consideration. Thomas Gautrey, a member of the Liberal-backed Progressive Party that controlled the London County Council was selected. Gautrey, a former teacher and member of the London School Board, was secretary of the London Teachers Association. He was a long-term resident of Peckham, and had represented the area on the county council since 1904.

The Conservative Party had selected Henry Gooch, a Moderate Party councillor representing the neighbouring Dulwich on the London County Council as their prospective parliamentary candidate. The Moderate Party formed the opposition on the county council, and were allied to the parliamentary Conservatives. Gooch had represented Peckham on the London School Board from 1897 until 1904, when the board was abolished. His candidacy was unanimously approved at a meeting of the Peckham Conservative Association on 12 March.

It was anticipated that the Labour Party would nominate a candidate. The party had not contested parliamentary elections in Peckham, but had begun to organise in the area. W. T. Kelly of the Amalgamated Society of Engineers, who had unsuccessfully contested the county council elections in 1907, was seen as most likely to run. The Camberwell Socialist Council decided on 15 March not to put forward a candidate, as it was felt that this would lead to a split in the anti-Conservative vote.

== The campaign ==
Gooch's campaign centred on opposition to the policies of the Liberal government of Henry Campbell-Bannerman. In particular he attacked the provisions of the Licensing Act 1906 and proposed education reforms. The Licensed Victuallers' Association pledged to support Gooch. There was controversy when it emerged that Meux's Brewery had made two large donations to the Conservative campaign, and the cheques were immediately returned. Gooch was also a strong proponent of "Imperial Preference" and was supported by the Tariff Reform League.

Gautrey, in his election address, made clear his support for free trade and for the government's licensing legislation. He was in favour of women's suffrage, land reform, and ending denominational education in publicly funded schools. He was opposed to the "hereditary principle in the Legislature" and would support any legislation that curbed the powers of the House of Lords. Gautrey was supported by the Women's Freedom League and the Free Trade Union.

== Polling day ==
Polling opened at 8 a.m., although party organisers began work two hours earlier. Forty motor cars were used by the two parties to bring their supporters to the polls, and Peckham was said to present "the appearance of a huge fair". Processions of voters moved through the streets accompanied by marching bands and displaying coloured rosettes and lights: red for the Conservatives and blue for the Liberals.

== Result ==
The votes were counted at Camberwell Town Hall, with the result announced at 11 pm. The Conservatives overturned the Liberal majority by a margin of nearly two and a half thousand votes, surpassing their expectations. The party's celebrations continued late into the night, including a firework display.

Peckham by-election 1908
Party	Candidate	Votes	%	±%
Conservative	Henry Gooch	6,970	60.9	+23.3
Liberal	Thomas Gautrey	4,476	39.1	−23.3
Majority		2,494	21.8	N/A
Turnout		11,446	78.3	+2.0
Conservative gain from Liberal		Swing	+23.3	
