= Silkin Test =

The Silkin Test is a UK planning policy designed to control major developments which will affect areas classified as National Parks and Areas of Outstanding Natural Beauty (AONB).

The three main criteria state that -

1. it must be in the National interest;
2. there is no practicable alternative to development in a National Park;
3. must be built in a way that minimises detrimental effects on the environment.

The test was contained in Planning Policy Statement (PPS) 7: Sustainable Development in Rural Areas (formerly PPG7) PPS7 has now been replaced by the National Planning Policy Framework (2012), in which paras. 115/116 set out a differently-worded test.

== History ==
The criteria were first proposed by the then Minister of Town and Country Planning, Lewis Silkin MP in 1949.

== Notable applications ==
- South Wales Gas Pipeline (2007)

== See also ==
- Lewis Silkin, 1st Baron Silkin
- Sandford approach (1976)
- Waldegrave formulation (1987)
