= 1936 Peckham by-election =

UK Parliamentary by-election

The 1936 Peckham by-election was held on 6 May 1936. The by-election was held due to the succession to the House of Lords of the incumbent Conservative MP, David Beatty, Viscount Borodale. It was won by the Labour candidate Lewis Silkin, who defeated P. G. A. Harvey, son of Sir George Harvey, by 100 votes.

Peckham by-election, 1936
Party	Candidate	Votes	%	±%
Labour	Lewis Silkin	13,007	50.2	+1.5
Conservative	Percival George Arthur Harvey	12,907	49.8	−1.5
Majority		100	0.4	N/A
Turnout		25,914	56.5	−8.3
Labour gain from Conservative		Swing		
