= Henry Gooch =

British politician (1871–1959)

Sir Henry Cubitt Gooch JP (7 December 1871 – 15 January 1959) was a British barrister, educationalist and Conservative politician.

He was the second son of Charles Cubitt Gooch, merchant banker, and Mary Blake, and an older brother to George Peabody Gooch. He was born in Paddington and educated at Eton College and Trinity College, Cambridge before being called to the bar at the Inner Temple. He had a keen interest in education, and was a member of the London School Board from 1897 until its abolition in 1904. In 1907 he was elected to the London County Council, representing Dulwich for the Conservative-supported Municipal Reform Party. He presided over a number of the LCC education committees.

At a by-election in 1908 Gooch was elected as Conservative Member of Parliament for Peckham, winning the seat from the Liberals. He held the seat at the ensuing election in January 1910, but was defeated by his Liberal opponent in December 1910.

In 1916 the British government appointed two committees to review the provision of education in the United Kingdom. Gooch was made a member of the Modern Languages Committee, which had the duty to advise on the measures that were needed to promote the study of languages "regards being had to the requiremants of a liberal education, including an appreciation of the hisdtory, literature and civilisation of other countries, and to the interests of commerce and public service". He was subsequently appointed to the secondary and technical Burnham Committees which set the salary scales for teaching staff.

Gooch continued his association with the London County Council, and served as its chairman in 1923–1924. In 1928 he was knighted as part of the Birthday Honours "for political and public services in the County of London"

He married Maud Mary Hudleston in 1897, and they had three children. They lived together at Inholmes in Lambourn in Berkshire for several years. He died on 15 January 1959, aged 87.

Parliament of the United Kingdom
Preceded by Charles Clarke	Member of Parliament for Peckham; 1908–1910	Succeeded by Sir Albion Richardson
Political offices
Preceded by Francis Robert Ince Anderton	Chairman of the London County Council; 1923–1924	Succeeded by J Herbert Hunter
