= Thomas Gautrey =

British politician (1859-1942)

Gautrey in 1908

Thomas Gautrey (6 March 1852 – 6 December 1949) was a British politician and schoolteacher.

Born in Cottenham, in Lincolnshire, Gautrey qualified as a schoolteacher at the Borough Road College, and then began teaching in London. In 1891, he became the secretary of the London Teachers' Association. This led him to be elected to the London School Board in 1894, representing the Liberal Party. The board was later abolished, and at the 1904 London County Council election, Gautrey won a seat in Dulwich, for the Progressive Party.

At the 1907 London County Council election, Gautrey moved to represent the safer seat of Peckham, holding it until his defeat in the 1925 London County Council election. On the council, he was known for his advocacy of health and safety, and of education. He also stood for Parliament in the 1908 Peckham by-election, but was unsuccessful.

In retirement, Gautrey chaired numerous secondary school associations, and also the council of the Camberwell School of Arts and Crafts.
