= John Redwood =

British politician (born 1951)

The Right Honourable The Lord Redwood PC
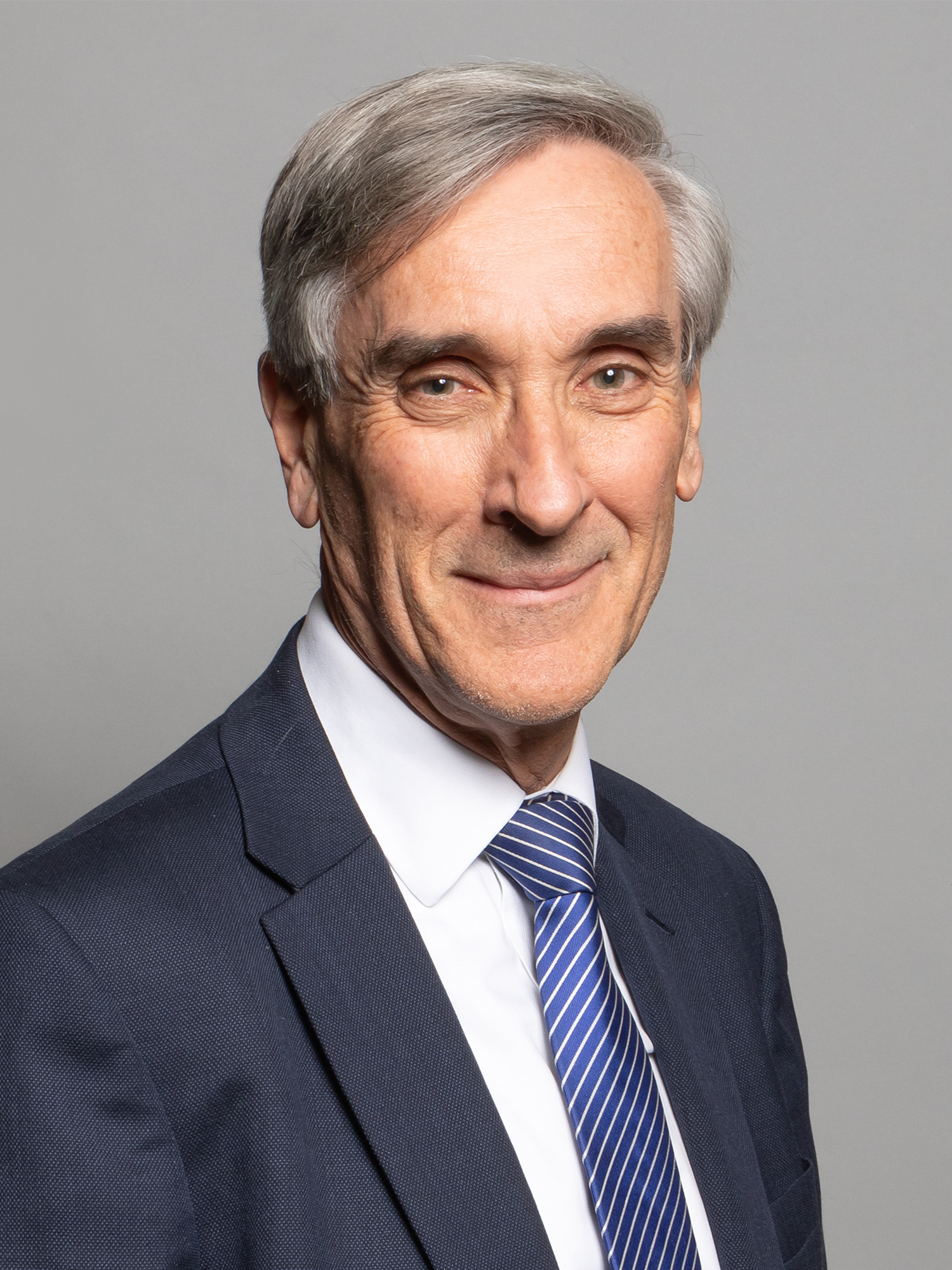
- Official portrait, 2020

Secretary of State for Wales
- In office 27 May 1993 – 26 June 1995
- Prime Minister: John Major
- Preceded by: David Hunt
- Succeeded by: William Hague

Minister of State for Local Government
- In office 15 April 1992 – 27 May 1993
- Prime Minister: John Major
- Preceded by: Michael Portillo
- Succeeded by: David Curry

Minister of State for Corporate Affairs
- In office 26 July 1989 – 15 April 1992
- Prime Minister: Margaret Thatcher; John Major
- Preceded by: Francis Maude
- Succeeded by: Neil Hamilton

Director of the Number 10 Policy Unit
- In office 5 May 1982 – 12 November 1987
- Prime Minister: Margaret Thatcher
- Preceded by: Ferdinand Mount
- Succeeded by: Brian Griffiths
Shadow portfolios
Shadow Secretary of State for Deregulation
In office 6 May 2005 – 5 December 2005
Leader	Michael Howard
Preceded by	Position established
Succeeded by	Position abolished
Shadow Secretary of State for Environment, Transport and the Regions
In office 15 June 1999 – 2 February 2000
Leader	William Hague
Preceded by	Gillian Shephard
Succeeded by	Archie Norman
Shadow Secretary of State for Trade and Industry
In office 11 June 1997 – 15 June 1999
Leader	John Major; William Hague
Preceded by	Michael Heseltine
Succeeded by	Angela Browning

Member of Parliament for Wokingham
- In office 11 June 1987 – 30 May 2024
- Preceded by: William van Straubenzee
- Succeeded by: Clive Jones

Member of the House of Lords
- Lord Temporal
- Life peerage 30 January 2026

Personal details
- Born: John Alan Redwood; 15 June 1951 (age 75) Dover, Kent, England
- Party: Conservative
- Spouse: Gail Chippington (m. 1974; div. 2003)
- Children: 2
- Education: Magdalen College, Oxford (BA); St Antony's College, Oxford (MPhil); All Souls College, Oxford (DPhil)

Academic background
- Thesis: The fear of atheism in England, from the Restoration to Berkeley's Alciphron (1975)

Sir John Alan Redwood, Baron Redwood (born 15 June 1951) is a British politician and academic who was the Member of Parliament (MP) for Wokingham in Berkshire from 1987 to 2024. A member of the Conservative Party, he was Secretary of State for Wales in the Major government and was twice an unsuccessful candidate for the leadership of the Conservative Party in the 1990s. Redwood subsequently served in the Shadow Cabinets of William Hague and Michael Howard; he remained a backbencher from then on. Redwood was knighted in the 2019 New Year Honours List. On 24 May 2024, Redwood announced that he would stand down as MP for Wokingham and not seek re-election in the 2024 general election.

Prior to becoming an MP, Redwood completed a doctorate at All Souls College, Oxford and served as Director of the Number 10 Policy Unit under Margaret Thatcher. He is a veteran Eurosceptic who was described in 1993 as a "pragmatic Thatcherite". He was the co-chairman of the Conservative Party's Policy Review Group on Economic Competitiveness until 2010. He has the role of Chief Global Strategist of investment management company Charles Stanley & Co Ltd (part of Charles Stanley Group). Redwood supported Brexit in the 2016 EU referendum, and was a member of the British Eurosceptic pressure group Leave Means Leave.

== Early life and education ==
John Redwood was born in Dover, the second child of William Redwood (1925–2016), an accountant and company secretary, and his wife, Amy Emma (née Champion), the manager of a shoe shop. He had an elder sister, Jennifer, who died as a baby in 1949. His childhood began in a council house, and he describes his family buying their own house as a "big breakthrough" for the family.

Redwood was educated at private Kent College in Canterbury, and Magdalen College, Oxford, where he graduated with a BA in modern history in 1971. He was a postgraduate at St Antony's College, Oxford, from 1971 to 1972 and was elected an Examination Fellow at All Souls College, Oxford, from 1972 to 1979, which later led to a distinguished fellowship in 2007. At All Souls, he wrote a DPhil thesis which investigated the fear of atheism in England, from the Restoration to the publication of Alciphron by George Berkeley. He graduated with a DPhil in 1975.

== Political career ==
=== Before parliament ===
Redwood was an Oxfordshire county councillor, representing the Conservative Party between 1973 and 1977, the youngest ever at the age of 21 when elected. In 1981, he unsuccessfully stood for the Greater London Council seat of Peckham. From 1983 onwards, he headed Margaret Thatcher's policy unit, where he was one of the champions of privatisation.

Redwood stood as the Conservative candidate at the Peckham by-election of October 1982, coming third with 12.42% of the vote behind the Labour Party candidate Harriet Harman and the SDP candidate Dick Taverne.

=== As a parliamentarian ===
At the 1987 general election, Redwood was elected to the House of Commons as the MP for Wokingham, winning with 61.4% of the vote and a majority of 20,387.

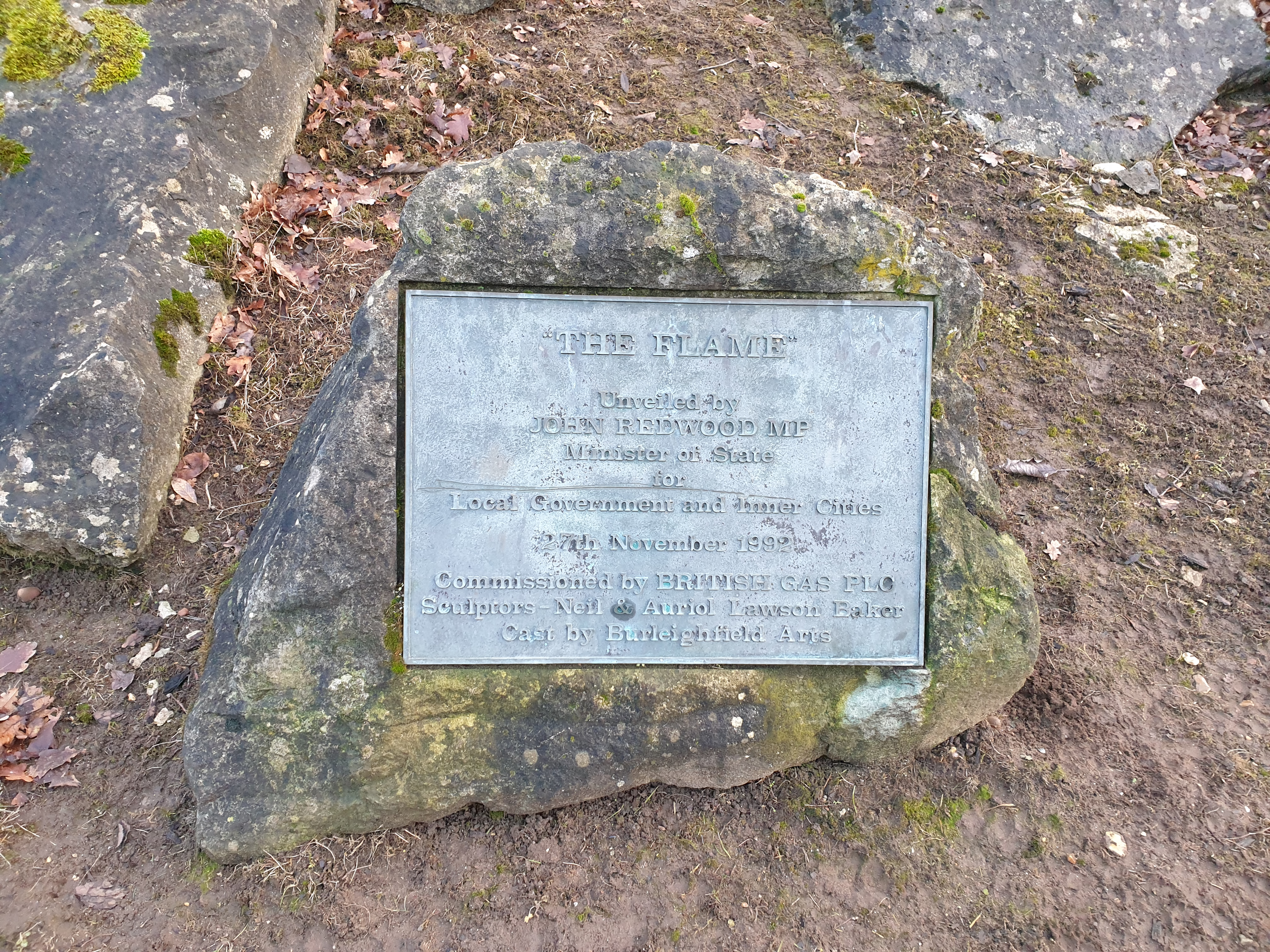
A memory of the period as Minister of State for Local Government and Inner Cities

He was made a Parliamentary Under-Secretary of State in July 1989 for corporate affairs at the Department of Trade and Industry. In November 1990, he was promoted to Minister of State. Redwood became Minister for Local Government and Inner Cities following the 1992 general election, where he oversaw the abolition of the Community Charge, known colloquially as the "poll tax", and its replacement with the Council Tax.

Redwood was re-elected as the MP for Wokingham at the 1992 general election with the same vote share of 61.4% and an increased majority of 25,709.

Redwood was opposed to attempts to reduce the age of consent for homosexuality in both 1994 and 1999, choosing to vote to keep Section 28 in November 2003. He has generally been opposed to same-sex marriage. He voted for the reintroduction of capital punishment in 1988, 1990 and 1994 and voiced support for the reintroducing of the death penalty when he launched his leadership bid on 26 June 1995. Redwood has stated since then: "I have never spoken or written against civil partnerships and gay marriage and am not proposing any change to current laws. I regard the debate about capital punishment as being over and do not support its reintroduction."

At the 1997 general election, Redwood was again re-elected, with a decreased vote share of 50.1% and a decreased majority of 9,365. After the election, Redwood was appointed Shadow Secretary of State for Trade and Industry by William Hague. He was appointed Shadow Secretary of State for the Environment, Transport and the Regions in June 1999, but was dropped in a mini reshuffle in February 2000, being succeeded by Archie Norman.

Redwood was again re-elected at the 2001 general election with a decreased vote share of 46.1% and a decreased majority of 5,994. Under Michael Howard, he was appointed Shadow Secretary of State for Deregulation.

At the 2005 general election, Redwood was again re-elected, with an increased vote share of 48.1% and an increased majority of 7,240. Redwood was interviewed about the rise of Thatcherism for the BBC television documentary series of 2006, Tory! Tory! Tory!, and has often appeared on television, including appearances on the BBC's Question Time.

Redwood was again re-elected at the 2010 general election with an increased vote share of 52.7% and an increased majority of 13,492. In 2011, he abstained on the military intervention in Libya. Redwood supports the establishment of a devolved English parliament. Following the 2014 Scottish independence referendum, Redwood called for radical reform involving the establishment of an English Parliament. His politicking prior to and succeeding the referendum placed him "front and centre" to any political gain due to the perceived power vacuum resulting from any possible changes to the status quo of the union.

At the 2015 general election, Redwood was again re-elected with an increased vote share of 57.7% and an increased majority of 24,197. He was again re-elected at the snap 2017 general election, with a decreased vote share of 56.6% and a decreased majority of 18,798. He was again re-elected at the 2019 general election with a decreased vote share of 49.6% and a decreased majority of 7,383. In 2021, Redwood publicly argued with Greta Thunberg over the UK's climate emissions on Twitter.

On 24 May 2024, two days after announcement of the date of the 2024 general election, and just 40 days before the actual date, John Redwood announced he would not be standing again for his Wokingham constituency, saying that he had ‘other things I wish to do’.

=== As a government minister ===
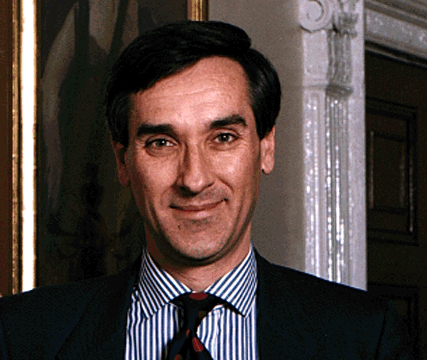
Official portrait, 1995

In the government reshuffle of May 1993, Redwood was appointed to the cabinet as Secretary of State for Wales. He deferred some road-widening schemes in Wales because of suggested harm to the environment.

Redwood committed a gaffe in 1993, when he attempted to mime to the Welsh national anthem at the Welsh Conservative Party conference, when he did not know the words. Redwood subsequently learned the anthem but, in August 2007, an unconnected news story on Redwood was illustrated with the same clip. This resulted in Conservative activists filing complaints, and as a result the BBC apologised to Redwood for airing the dated footage. In February 1995, he was at loggerheads with the Countryside Council for Wales, because he had decided to cut its grant by 16%.

Redwood consequently gained a somewhat haughty reputation with apparent disregard for Welsh national feeling; this did not endear him further to some of the population, including when he returned £100 million of Wales's block grant to the Treasury unspent in 1995.

=== Leadership contests ===
When John Major called upon his critics to "put up or shut up" and tendered his resignation to allow for a leadership challenge, Redwood resigned from the Cabinet, and stood against Major in the subsequent party leadership election on 26 June 1995. In the ballot held on 4 July 1995, Redwood received 89 votes, around a quarter of the then Parliamentary Party. Major received 218 votes, or two thirds of the parliamentary party vote. The Sun newspaper had declared its support for Redwood in the run up to the leadership contest, running the front-page headline "Redwood versus Deadwood".

When Major resigned as party leader following the General Election defeat of May 1997, Redwood stood in the resulting election for the leadership, and was again defeated. After being defeated in the third round with 38 votes to Kenneth Clarke's 64 and William Hague's 62, Redwood backed Clarke against Hague.

=== Brexit ===
Redwood is a veteran Eurosceptic. A critic of the Euro before its launch, in 2011 Redwood suggested that the Eurozone should "break up", and proposed that the United Kingdom should give up its Council voting rights in return for the ability to opt out of any EU legislation. There are no existing laws that would permit such an arrangement, as it would make European law not apply evenly across the Union as a whole. Later that year, he joined 81 rebel Conservative MPs in voting for an in-out referendum for leaving the European Union, saying afterwards "People used to call me an extreme Eurosceptic. Now I'm a moderate." Before the Brexit referendum, Redwood wrote that, to Conservative Eurosceptics like him, leaving the EU was "more important than which party wins the next election or who is the prime minister."

Since then, he has suggested the United Kingdom need not prioritise a post-Brexit deal with the EU, and received criticism for writing an investment advice column which recommended investors "look further afield" than the United Kingdom. Redwood denied this interpretation, saying that he simply advises investors of where international markets are heading and did not write an investment column "recommending investors pull their money out of the United Kingdom".

In statements to media and in the House of Commons, Redwood has consistently defended the position that the UK should not pay the so-called Brexit bill (amounting to around £39 billion). This is in line with a House of Lords EU financial affairs committee report, which itself is contested on its legal soundness since the financial settlement simply reflects commitments already entered into by the UK under the EU's multi-annual financial framework for the years 2014–2020 and therefore is not linked to the process of the UK leaving the European Union. In December 2019, Redwood voted in favour of the Withdrawal Agreement through which the UK accepts to pay its outstanding financial obligations to the EU.

In June 2021, Redwood criticised the composition of the G7 which includes the president of the European Commission and the president of the European Council in addition to representatives from France, Germany and Italy. According to Redwood this hands a majority to the EU in the G7, even if the G7 does not take decisions through majority voting.

=== Public image ===
He has often been compared to a Vulcan, a comparison originally made by Matthew Parris, due to his physical appearance and intonation, a preference for making arguments with logic over passion and a reputation for being cold and humourless. Redwood said that he does not like the description but "if you don't like the heat then get out of the kitchen". He continued, "I think people sometimes go for those kind of things because they haven't managed to trap me in the more normal way."

=== House of Lords ===
Redwood was nominated for a life peerage by Kemi Badenoch in December 2025 as part of the 2025 Political Peerages to sit as a Conservative peer in the House of Lords; he was created Baron Redwood, of Wokingham in the Royal County of Berkshire on 30 January 2026.

== Business career ==
Redwood worked as an investment analyst, manager and director for Robert Fleming and for NM Rothschild in the 1970s and 1980s. In 2007 he co-founded Evercore Pan-Asset Capital Management Ltd, a financial management company, which was subsequently sold to Charles Stanley. He is currently Chief Global Strategist at Charles Stanley & Co Ltd. He was previously a non-executive chairman of Mabey Securities, an investment arm of the engineering firm Mabey.

In January 2023, Sky News revealed that Redwood had, since the 2019 general election, earned more than £600,000 in addition to his salary as an MP – the fifth-highest amount of any MP.

== Personal life ==
He married Gail Felicity Chippington, a barrister, on 20 April 1974 in Chipping Norton; they had two children, Catherine (born 1978) and Richard (born 1982). They divorced in July 2003.

== Honours ==
- Appointed to the Privy Council of the United Kingdom in 1993, giving him the honorific "the Right Honourable" for life.
- Knighted in the 2019 New Year Honours List.

== Bibliography ==
- I Don't Like Politics: But I Want to Make a Difference. Politico's Publishing. October 2006. ISBN 978-1-84275-182-4.
- Singing the Blues: 30 Years Of Tory Civil War. Politico's Publishing. October 2004. ISBN 978-1-84275-076-6.
- Just Say No!: 100 Arguments Against the Euro. Politico's Publishing. July 2001. ISBN 978-1-902301-99-0.
- Stars and Strife: The Coming Conflict Between the USA and the European Union. Palgrave Macmillan. February 2001. ISBN 978-0-333-91841-8.
- The Death of Britain?. Palgrave Macmillan. May 1999. ISBN 978-0-333-74439-0.
- Our Currency, Our Country: Dangers of European Monetary Union. Penguin Books. March 1997. ISBN 978-0-14-026523-1.
- Public Enterprise in Crisis: Future of Nationalized Industries. Blackwell Publishers. November 1980. ISBN 978-0631125822.
- Reason, Ridicule and Religion: The Age of Enlightenment in England 1660–1750. Thames and Hudson. 1976. ISBN 0-500-27885-7

Parliament of the United Kingdom
Preceded by William van Straubenzee	Member of Parliament for Wokingham; 1987–2024	Succeeded by Clive Jones
Political offices
Preceded by David Hunt	Secretary of State for Wales; 1993–1995	Succeeded by William Hague
Preceded by Michael Heseltine	Shadow Secretary of State for Trade and Industry; 1997–1999	Succeeded by Angela Browning
Preceded by Gillian Shephard	Shadow Secretary of State for the Environment, Transport and the Regions; 1999–2000	Succeeded by Archie Norman
New office	Shadow Secretary of State for Deregulation; 2004–2005	Position abolished
