= 1982 Peckham by-election =

UK parliamentary by-election

- 28 October 1982

Constituency of Peckham
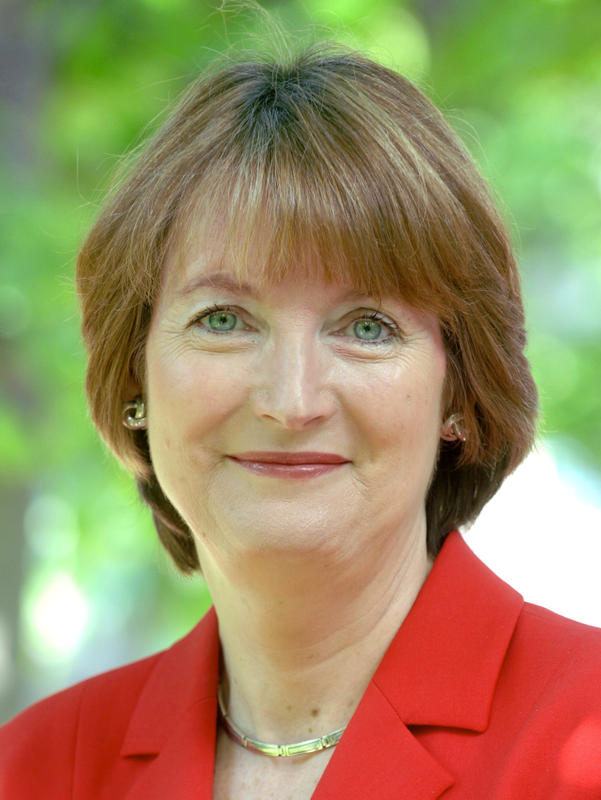

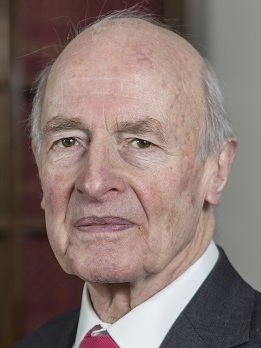

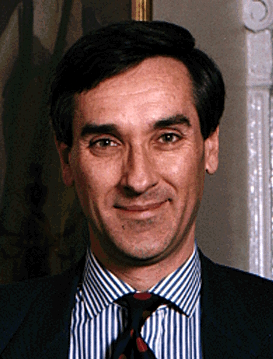
	First party	Second party	Third party
Candidate	Harriet Harman	Dick Taverne	John Redwood
Party	Labour	SDP	Conservative
Popular vote	11,349	7,418	2,800
Percentage	50.34%	32.91%	12.42%
Swing	▼9.51%	▲25.25%	▼15.65%
MP before election
Harry Lamborn
Labour
Elected MP
Harriet Harman
Labour

The 1982 Peckham by-election of 28 October 1982 was held following the death of Labour Member of Parliament (MP) Harry Lamborn on 21 August 1982. The seat was retained for Labour by Harriet Harman.

== Result ==
Peckham by-election, 1982
Party	Candidate	Votes	%	±%
Labour	Harriet Harman	11,349	50.34	−9.51
SDP	Dick Taverne	7,418	32.91	+25.25
Conservative	John Redwood	2,800	12.42	−15.65
National Front	Martin Webster	874	3.88	−0.54
Democratic Monarchist, Public Safety, White Resident	Bill Boaks	102	0.45	New
Majority		3,931	17.44	−14.34
Turnout		22,543		
Labour hold		Swing	-17.38	

Note: The change in the Social Democrat vote is calculated against the votes won by the Liberal Party at the 1979 general election, as the two parties had formed the SDP–Liberal Alliance.
