= Supermarine Spitfire (early Merlin-powered variants) =

Early variants of the Supermarine Spitfire

Spitfire
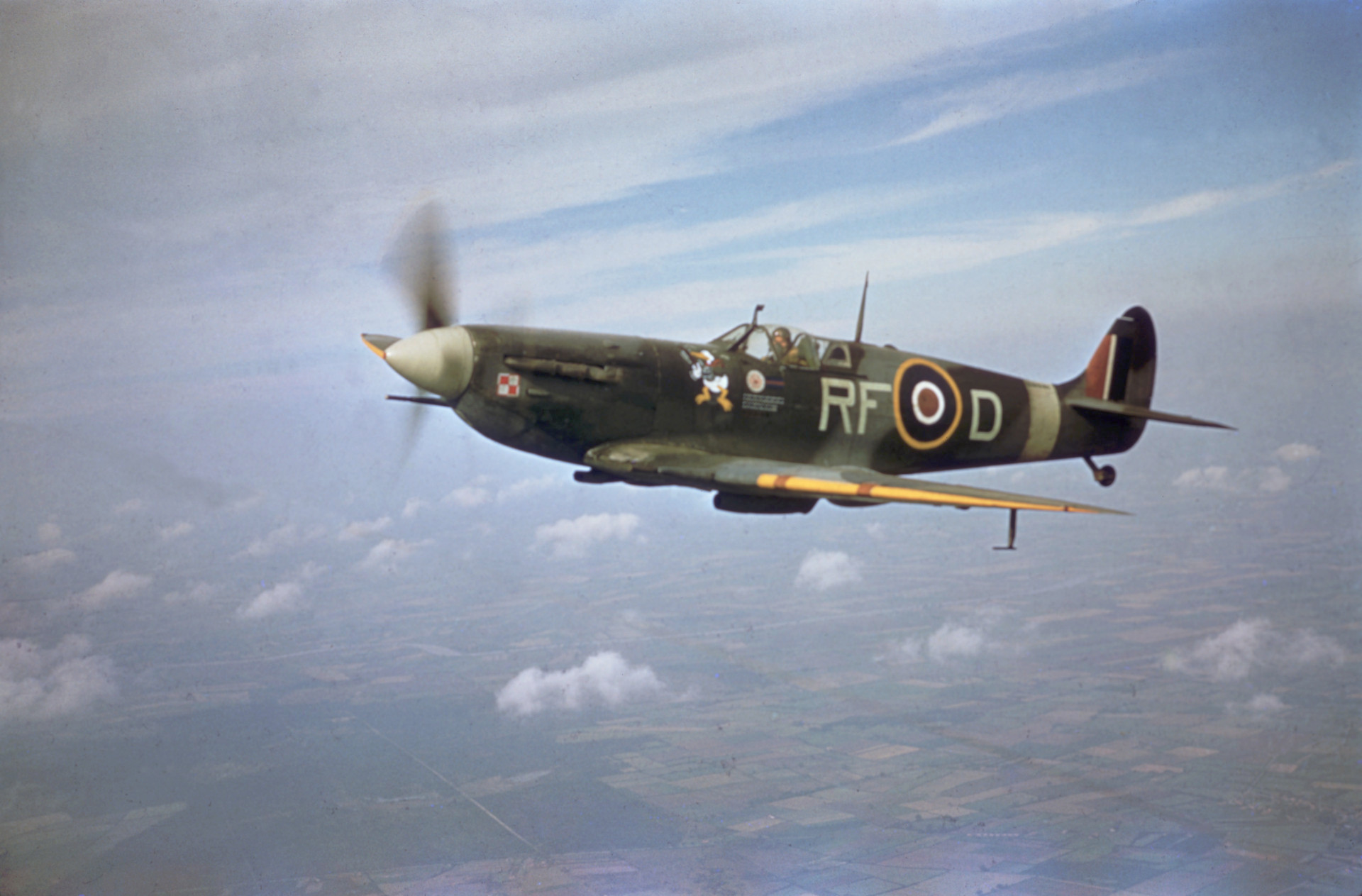
- Polish Spitfire Mk Vb from 303 (Polish) Squadron flown by S/Ldr Zumbach.

General information
- Type: Fighter
- Manufacturer: Supermarine
- Designer: R. J. Mitchell
- Primary user: Royal Air Force
- Number built: 20,351

History
- Manufactured: 1938–1948
- Introduction date: 1938
- First flight: 5 March 1936
- Retired: 1955, RAF
- Variants: Seafire; Spiteful

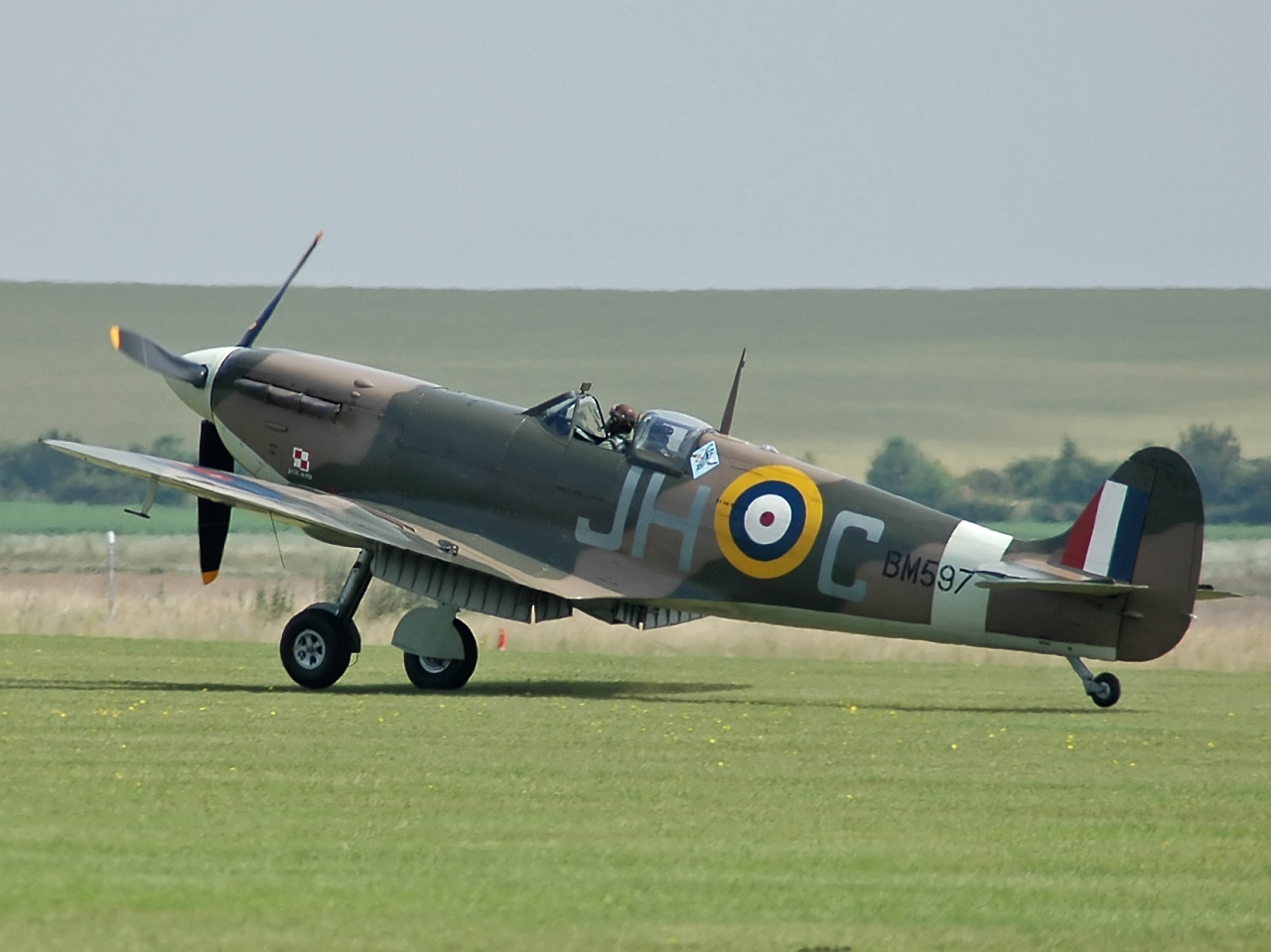
Spitfire Mk Vb BM597 of Duxford's Historic Aircraft Collection in the markings of 317 (Polish) "Wileński" Squadron.

Supermarine Spitfire variants powered by early model Rolls-Royce Merlin engines mostly utilised single-speed, single-stage superchargers. The British Supermarine Spitfire was the only Allied fighter aircraft of the Second World War to fight in front line service from the beginnings of the conflict, in September 1939, through to the end in August 1945. Post-war, the Spitfire's service career continued into the 1950s. The basic airframe proved to be extremely adaptable, capable of taking far more powerful engines and far greater loads than its original role as a short-range interceptor had called for. This would lead to 19 marks of Spitfire and 52 sub-variants being produced throughout the Second World War, and beyond. The many changes were made in order to fulfil Royal Air Force requirements and to successfully engage in combat with ever-improving enemy aircraft. With the death of the original designer, Reginald J. Mitchell, in June 1937, all variants of the Spitfire were designed by his successor, Joseph Smith, and a team of engineers and draftsmen.

== Wing types ==
The Spitfires with the single-stage Merlin engines used five different wing types, Type A, B, C, D and E wings, which had the same dimensions and plan but different internal arrangements of armament and fuel tanks. All Mk Is, IIs, and Vs and their derivatives had small, rectangular undercarriage indicator pins which projected at an angle from the upper wing surfaces when the undercarriage legs were locked down, providing a positive mechanical indication that the landing gears were indeed down and locked, since the pilot could not see the landing gear for himself. These were a backup to the indicator lights on the instrument panel, in case the lights malfunctioned or failed. All of these variants used Dunlop AH2061 tyres, mounted on alloy mainwheels which had five openings. The fixed, castering tailwheels used Dunlop AH2184 tyres.

Starting with the Mk V, some Spitfires had their rounded elliptical wingtips "clipped" outboard of the ailerons, and replaced by shorter, squared-off fairings to improve low-altitude performance and enhance the roll rate, one area where the Mk V fell badly behind the rival Fw 190. Although these "clipped-wing" aircraft are popularly known as "LF" versions due to the fact that they were designated "LF" (i.e. Spitfire LF Mk V), the "L" actually refers to the different versions of the Rolls-Royce Merlin engines used, which were optimised for low-altitude performance with "cropped" supercharger impellers (Merlin 45M, 50M or 55M). While many "LF" Spitfires were given "clipped" wings to accompany the new engine variants, a number still retained the original wingtips.

=== A type ===
The A-type was the original wing design, with eight .303 calibre Browning machine guns, with 300 rounds per gun (rpg). The basic structure of the wing was unchanged until the C type in 1942. The one major alteration made to this wing, soon after production started, was the incorporation of a heating system for the gun bays, to prevent the guns from freezing up at high altitudes. To achieve this, open structures, such as wing ribs, surrounding the gun-bays were closed off, forming closed bays for each gun. Ducting was added, which drew heated air from the engine radiator and transferred it into the now-closed weapon-bays. Underwing vents, covered by streamlined triangular blisters just inboard of the wingtips, extracted the air, creating a negative pressure differential, and caused more heated air to be drawn in, ensuring a steady supply of heated air without any need for a mechanical blower. To keep cold air from blowing in via the muzzle openings in the leading edge, they were sealed with red fabric adhesive tape by ground crew while loading the ammunition trays. The guns fired through the tape, so they were no longer sealed after combat. Towards the end of 1940, the fabric covered ailerons were replaced by ones covered in light alloy. The A-type wing was only compatible with the 8 × .303 Browning machine gun armament suite.

=== B type ===
The B-type wing was structurally an A type modified to carry one 20 mm Hispano cannon per wing, which replaced the two inner .303 machine guns. The retractable underwing landing lamp was repositioned. The cannon was installed in the innermost machine gun bay, next to the wheelwell, while the second gun was deleted altogether. The area where the inner guns' ammunition trays had been located, outboard of the cannon bay, was converted into a compartment to accommodate the 60-round drum magazine for the cannon. The upper and lower wing skins now incorporated blisters to clear the large ammunition drum (the underwing blisters came in two different shapes). The remaining outer pairs of .303's were not changed at all. Only one armament suite could be fitted to a Spitfire with the B-type wing: Two 20 mm Hispano Mk II cannon, each with a 60-round drum, and four .303 caliber Browning machine guns in the outer positions, with 350 rpg. Alloy-covered ailerons were standardised on this wing type.

=== C type ===
The "C-type" wing, or "Universal wing" was a more heavily modified wing, redesigned to reduce labour and manufacturing time, as well as to allow different armament configuration options to be fitted in a single, universal wing structure which could accommodate several different armament layouts without serious structural modification or alteration (a similar kind of wing was developed for the Hawker Hurricane, allowing anything from 8 to 10 .303 Brownings, to four 20mm Hispanos, to twin anti-tank 40mm Vickers "S" guns and a pair of .303's to be fitted into the same wing). Without modification, the "universal" wing could accept "A", "B", "C" or "E-type" armament configuration, although the "E" type wasn't used until later marks of Spitfire. The "B" type, 2-cannon, 4-Browning layout was by far the most commonly seen on "C" wing Spitfires, until the Mk IX and the "E" wing. Differences in the "C" wings include a second cannon-bay added directly alongside the first, and the #3 Browning gun being moved slightly outboard from ribs 13 to 14, making the two outer machine guns closer together than in the older "B" type wing.

Although officially any aircraft with a universal wing is a "C" variant regardless of their armament configuration (excepting "E" types), in later popular (and incorrect) usage, "C" variants with the same armament as the "B" type are often called "B" variants, even though it's technically a "C", and structurally it is different than the older "B" wing Spitfire. The new wing now had two inner gun bays able to accommodate cannon, although one bay was usually left empty. The outer two .303 machine guns were also moved closer together than in "A" or "B" type wings, which is one of the primary visual aids to distinguishing an original "B" type from later universal wing "B types", along with the second pair of cannon ports, which are visible even though typically no weapons are fitted in the second cannon bay. In this case, the empty port is usually closed off with a rubber plug. The cannon mounts were also moved further back in the wing, so the barrel fairings of the cannon are shorter than on an original "B" Spitfire.

Few, if any, "C" Spitfires were built with the eight .303 Browning "A" armament configuration, which was viewed as obsolete by the time the Mk V went into combat. The "C" type wing was the first which could accommodate an all-cannon armament of four 20mm Hispanos; thus the "C" designation is popularly reserved for four-cannon Spitfires (i.e. Mk Vc). The "C" type armament was also rarely used (although not as rare as the "A" armament), due to the extra weight of the added cannon eroding performance and handling. Many Spitfires originally fitted with the "C" armament had the extra cannon removed in the field to save weight. In theory, a "Universal" wing Spitfire could carry an armament of four 20mm cannon and four .303 Brownings, but this would be heavily loading the aircraft indeed, and thus was never used. (An "E" type wing, usually seen in Mk IX and later versions, was similar to the "C" armament, but used a pair of American .50 caliber Browning AN/M2 heavy machine guns in place of the inner pair of Hispanos, giving an armament of two Hispanos and two .50cal Brownings.)

The Universal wing also took into account the fact that the Hispano cannon had been converted to belt-feed, a move which allowed each cannon to carry double the ammunition load, or 120 rpg in ammunition trays instead of 60 rpg as in the original drum-fed cannon of the Mk Vb. This also eliminated the need for under- and over-wing blisters to accommodate the large-diameter ammunition drum, instead only requiring a small blister to cover the electrical "Chattellerault" feed mechanism. The undercarriage mountings were redesigned and the undercarriage doors were bowed in cross section allowing the legs to sit lower in the wells, eliminating the upper-wing blisters over the wheel wells and landing gear pivot points. The stronger undercarriage legs were angled 2 inches (5.08 cm) forward when extended, making the Spitfire more stable on the ground and reducing the likelihood of the aircraft tipping onto its nose. In addition the retractable landing lights were no longer fitted. Structural hard-points were added outboard of the wheel-wells, allowing racks to be fitted under each wing which were capable of carrying one 250 lb (113 kg) bomb each.

=== D type ===
The D type was modified for use on unarmed, long-range photo-reconnaissance versions of the Spitfire, such as the PR Mk Id (PR versions described in more detail below), with weapon bays left empty, and the relatively heavy-skinned leading edge wing structure ahead of the main spar converted to integral auxiliary fuel tanks capable of carrying 66 1/2 Imperial gallons (300 L) in addition to that stored in the fuselage tanks ahead of the cockpit. The filler caps were well outboard, between ribs 19 and 20 on the leading edge, because the wing tips were higher than the rest of the wing due to dihedral, and thus the only place a fuel filler cap could be located. An expansion and overflow vent was fitted to protect the tanks from bursting as the fuel vaporised and expanded from the hot sun beating directly on the thin metal wing skin (which doubled as the walls of the tank). This vent was fitted further outboard, between ribs 20 and 21, in the highest space in the tank, where vapor would naturally collect.

== Single-stage Merlin engine variants ==
=== Mark numbers, type numbers ===
The Mark numbers did not necessarily indicate a chronological order; for example, the Mk IX was a stopgap measure brought into production before the Mks VII and VIII. In addition, some Spitfires of one mark or variant may have been modified to another; for example, several of the first Mk Vbs were converted from Mk Ibs; the first Mk IXs were originally Mk Vcs, converted, in some instances, by Rolls-Royce at their Hucknall facility.

Up until the end of 1942, the RAF always used Roman numerals for mark numbers. 1943–48 was a transition period during which new aircraft entering service were given Arabic numerals for mark numbers but older aircraft retained their Roman numerals. From 1948 onwards, Arabic numerals were used exclusively. This article adopts the convention of using Roman numerals for the Mks I-XVI and Arabic numerals for the Mks 17–24. Type numbers (e.g., Type 361) are the drawing board design numbers allocated by Supermarine.

=== Prototype K5054 (Supermarine Type 300) ===
Construction of K5054 started in December 1934, with modifications incorporated as construction continued. One major change was to the Merlin engine's cooling system, with the adoption of ethylene glycol coolant together with a ducted radiator based on the work of Frederick Meredith at the Royal Aircraft Establishment, Farnborough.

The first flight took place on 5 March 1936. K5054 was unpainted and the undercarriage had no fairings fitted and was fixed down. No weapons were fitted. The first engine was a prototype Merlin C engine of 990 hp (738 kW).

After the first few flights K5054 was returned to the factory, reappearing about 10 days later with an overall gloss pale blue-grey finish. The engine cowlings had been altered and the angled fin tip had become straight topped with the rudder balance correspondingly reduced in size. Undercarriage fairings had now been fitted to the legs. An improved propeller was fitted and, with performance at last satisfactory, the machine was handed over to the RAF for service trials.

Later in 1936 the standard eight .303" Browning machine-gun armament was fitted. On 22 March 1937 K5054 force-landed with the undercarriage up. During repairs it was repainted in standard Dark Earth/Dark Green camouflage on the upper surfaces with silver dope finish under. On 19 September 1938 the Spitfire was flown for the first time with ejector exhausts, delivering an extra 70 pounds of thrust.

K5054 ended its flying life on 4 September 1939 while being tested at Farnborough. After a misjudged landing it tipped over on its back, fatally injuring the pilot Flt Lt. White. The aircraft was written off.

=== Mk I (Type 300) ===
Media related to Supermarine Spitfire Mark I at Wikimedia Commons

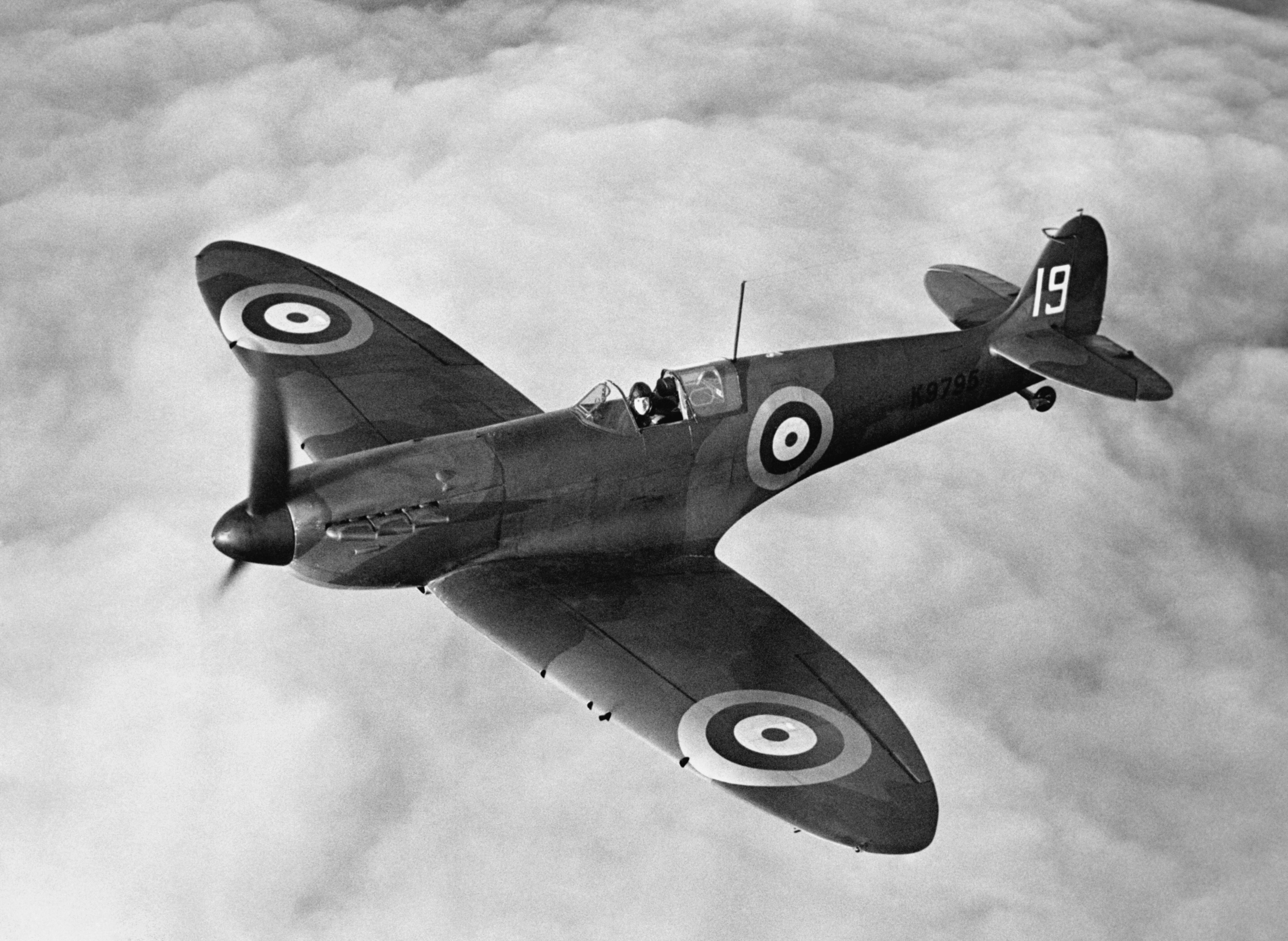
K9795, the 9th production Mk I, with 19 Squadron, showing the wooden, two-blade, fixed-pitch propeller, early "unblown" canopy and "wraparound" windscreen without the bulletproof glass plate. The original style of aerial mast is also fitted.

In 1936, before the first flight of the prototype, the Air Ministry placed an order for 310 Spitfires. However, in spite of the promises made by the Chairman of Vickers-Armstrongs (the parent company of Supermarine) that the company would be able to deliver Spitfire at a rate of five a week, it soon became clear that this would not happen. In 1936 the Supermarine company employed 500 people and was already engaged in fulfilling orders for 48 Walrus amphibian reconnaissance aircraft and 17 Stranraer patrol flying boats. In addition the small design staff, which would have to draft the blueprints for the production aircraft, was already working at full stretch. Although it was obvious that most of the work would have to be sub-contracted to outside sources, the Vickers-Armstrongs board was reluctant to allow this to happen. When other companies were able to start building Spitfire components there were continual delays because either parts provided to them would not fit, or the blueprints were inadequate; the sub-contractors themselves faced numerous problems building components which in many cases were more advanced and complicated than anything they had faced before.

As a consequence of the delays, the RAF received the first two Spitfires off the production line in July 1938, while the first Spitfire to enter squadron service was received by 19 Squadron in early August. (Note: K9788 (the 2nd production Spitfire) was delivered to Martlesham Heath for trials on 19 July 1938, followed by the first production Spitfire, K9787 on 27 July: K9789 was the first to enter squadron service on 4 August.) For a time the future of the Spitfire was in serious doubt, with the Air Ministry suggesting that the programme be abandoned and that Supermarine change over to building the Bristol Beaufighter under licence. The managements of Supermarine and Vickers were eventually able to convince the Air Ministry that production would be sorted out and, in 1938, an order was placed with Morris Motors Limited for an additional 1,000 Spitfires to be built at huge new factory which was to be built at Castle Bromwich. This was followed in 1939 by an order for another 200 from Woolston and, only a few months later, another 450. This brought the total to 2,160, making it one of the largest orders in RAF history. Over the next three years a large number of modifications were made, most as a result of wartime experience.

Early in the Spitfire's operational life a major problem became apparent; at altitudes above about 15,000 ft (4,572 m), any condensation could freeze in the guns. Because of this the system of gun heating first fitted to K5054 was introduced on the 61st production Mk I. At the outset of World War II, the flash-hiders on the gun muzzles were removed and the practice of sealing the gun ports with fabric patches was instituted. The patches kept the gun barrels free of dirt and debris and allowed the hot air to heat the guns more efficiently. Early production aircraft were fitted with a ring and bead gunsight, although provision had been made for a reflector sight to be fitted once one had been selected. In July 1938, the Barr and Stroud GM 2 was selected as the standard RAF reflector gunsight and was fitted to the Spitfire from late 1938. These first production Mk Is were able to reach a maximum speed of 362 mph (583 km/h) at 18,500 ft (5,600 m), with a maximum rate of climb of 2,490 ft/min at 10,000 ft (3,000 m). The service ceiling (where the climb rate drops to 100 ft/min) was 31,900 ft (9,700 m).

All Merlin I to III series engines relied on external electric power to start; a well known sight on RAF fighter airfields was the "trolley acc" (trolley accumulator) which was a set of powerful batteries which could be wheeled up to aircraft. The lead from the "Trolley Acc" was plugged into a small recess on the starboard side cowling of the Spitfire. On Supermarine-built aircraft a small brass instruction plate was secured to the side cowling, just beneath the starboard exhausts.

The early Mk Is were powered by the 1,030 hp (768 kW) Merlin Mk II engine driving an Aero-Products "Watts" 10 ft 8 in (3.3 m) diameter two-blade wooden fixed-pitch propeller, weighing 83 lb (38 kg). From the 78th production airframe, the Aero Products propeller was replaced by a 350 lb (183 kg) de Havilland 9 ft 8 in (2.97 m) diameter, three-bladed, two-position, metal propeller, which greatly improved take-off performance, maximum speed and the service ceiling. From the 175th production aircraft, the Merlin Mk III, with a "universal" propeller shaft able to take a de Havilland or Rotol propeller, was fitted. Following complaints from pilots a new form of "blown" canopy was manufactured and started replacing the original "flat" version in early 1939. This canopy improved headroom and enabled better vision laterally, and to the rear. At the same time the manual hand-pump for operating the undercarriage was replaced by a hydraulic system driven by a pump mounted in the engine bay. (Note: Before this change pilots had to pump the undercarriage up with their right hand while simultaneously trying to keep the Spitfire controlled using the left hand on the control column. This often led to a condition known as "Spitfire knuckle" where pilots skinned their hand on the side of the cockpit while pumping.) Spitfire Is incorporating these modifications were able to achieve a maximum speed of 367 mph (591 km/h) at 18,600 ft (5,700 m), with a maximum rate of climb of 2,150 ft/min at 10,000 ft (3,000 m). The service ceiling was 34,400 ft (10,500 m).

A voltage regulator under a black, cylindrical cover was mounted low on the back of frame 11, directly behind the pilot's seat: (Note: Frame 11 is the double thickness fuselage frame at the rear of the cockpit on which the pilot's seat and, from mid-1940, back and head armour was mounted.)starting in the N30xx series this was repositioned higher, appearing low in the rear transparency. From N32xx the regulator was mounted directly behind the pilot's headrest on frame 11. Other changes were made later in 1939 when a simplified design of pitot tube was introduced and the "rod" aerial mast was replaced by a streamlined, tapered design. To improve protection for the pilot and fuel tanks a thick laminated glass bulletproof plate was fitted to the curved, one piece windscreen and a 3 mm thick cover of light alloy, capable of deflecting small calibre rounds, was fitted over the top of the two fuel tanks. From about mid-1940, 73 pounds (33 kg) of armoured steel plating was provided in the form of head and back protection on the seat bulkhead and covering the forward face of the glycol header tank. In addition, the lower petrol tank was fitted with a fire-resistant covering called "Linatex", which was later replaced with a layer of self-sealing rubber.

In June 1940 de Havilland began manufacturing a kit to convert their two pitch propeller unit to a constant speed propeller. Although this propeller was a great deal heavier than the earlier types (500 lb (227 kg) compared with 350 lb (183 kg)) it provided another substantial improvement in take-off distance and climb rate. Starting on 24 June de Havilland engineers began fitting all Spitfires with these units and by 16 August every Spitfire and Hurricane had been modified. "Two step" rudder pedals were fitted to all frontline Spitfires; these allowed the pilot to lift his feet and legs higher during combat, improving his "blackout" threshold and allowing him to pull tighter sustained turns. Another modification was the small rear view mirror which was added to the top of the windscreen: an early "shrouded" style was later replaced by a simplified, rectangular, adjustable type.

A Spitfire Mk Ia of 602 Squadron in early 1940. A de Havilland 3 blade propeller unit is fitted, along with a "blown" canopy and the laminated bulletproof windscreen and later aerial mast. The brass plate below the external starter plug can be seen on the side engine cowling.

Starting in September 1940, IFF equipment was installed. This weighed about 40 lb (18 kg) and could be identified by wire aerials strung between the tailplane tips and rear fuselage. Although the added weight and the aerials reduced maximum speed by about two mph (three km/h), it allowed the aircraft to be identified as "friendly" on radar: lack of such equipment was a factor leading to the Battle of Barking Creek. At about the same time new VHF T/R Type 1133 radios started replacing the HF TR9 sets. These had first been fitted to Spitfires of 54 and 66 Squadrons in May 1940, but ensuing production delays meant the bulk of Spitfires and Hurricanes were not fitted for another five months. The pilots enjoyed a much clearer reception which was a big advantage with the adoption of Wing formations throughout the RAF in 1941. The new installation meant that the wire running between the aerial mast and rudder could be removed, as could the triangular "prong" on the mast.

Weight increases and aerodynamic changes led to later Spitfire Is having a lower maximum speed than the early production versions. This was more than offset by the improvements in take-off distance and rate of climb brought about by the constant speed propeller units. During the Battle of Britain Spitfire Mk Is equipped with constant-speed propellers had a maximum speed of 353 mph (568 km/h) at 20,000 ft (6,100 m), with a maximum rate of climb of 2,895 ft/min at 10,000 ft (3,000 m). (Note: One major problem which became apparent when the Spitfire encountered German fighters was the Merlin sometimes cut out "bunting" into a dive due to the carburettor design – see Rolls-Royce Merlin#Carburettor developments and Supermarine Spitfire#Carburettor versus fuel injection. Early Spitfires were at a disadvantage against Bf 109s which, with their direct fuel injection, could push straight into a dive. Spitfire pilots would have to half roll into a dive, pulling the control column back to apply "positive G", then roll back out again, by which time the Bf 109 was often long gone.)

Although the Merlin II engine of Spitfire Is running on 87 octane fuel and at 6.6 lbs boost, had a power rating of 1,030 hp (768 kW), the Air Ministry was by early 1937, well aware of the advantages of higher octane fuel on boost pressure particularly at lower altitudes and had committed to standardising on 100 octane fuel. By the end of 1937, contracts for delivery from sources in the United States and Trinidad had been placed but due to concerns about US neutrality restrictions, production access was significantly widened, so that by April 1940, delivery of 100 octane fuel (BAM 100) was arriving from 7 sources; the majority from British, Dutch and the West Indies refineries, with the remainder from US Shell. This meant that an "emergency boost" of +12 pounds per square inch was available for five minutes, with pilots able to call on 1,310 hp (977 kW) at 3,000 rpm at 9,000 feet (2,743 m). This boosted the maximum speed by 25 mph (40 km/h) at sea level and 34 mph (55 km/h) at 10,000 ft (3,000 m) and improved the climbing performance between sea level and full throttle height. The extra boost wasn't damaging as long as the limitations set forth in the pilot's notes were followed. As a precaution if the pilot had resorted to emergency boost, he had to report this on landing and it had to be noted in the engine log book. There was a wire 'gate' fitted, which the pilot had to break to set the engine to emergency power, this acted as an indicator that emergency power had been used and would be replaced by mechanics on the ground. The extra boost was also available for the Merlin XII fitted to the Spitfire II.

Late in 1940, a Martin-Baker designed quick-release canopy mechanism began to be retroactively fitted to all Spitfires. The system employed unlocking pins, actuated by cables operated by the pilot pulling a small, red rubber ball mounted on the canopy arch. When freed, the canopy was taken away by the slipstream. One of the most important modifications to the Spitfire was to replace the machine gun armament with wing mounted Hispano 20 mm cannon. In December 1938, Joseph Smith was instructed to prepare a scheme to equip a Spitfire with a single Hispano mounted under each wing. Smith objected to the idea and designed an installation in which the cannon were mounted on their sides within the wing, with only small external blisters on the upper and lower wing surfaces covering the 60 round drum magazine. The first Spitfire armed with a single Hispano in each wing was L1007 which was posted to Drem in January 1940 for squadron trials. On 13 January, this aircraft, piloted by Plt Off Proudman of 602 Squadron took part in an engagement when a Heinkel He 111 was shot down. Soon after this Supermarine was contracted to convert 30 Spitfires to take the cannon armed wing; 19 Squadron received the first of these in June 1940 and by 16 August 24 cannon armed Spitfires had been delivered. These were known as the Mk Ib: Mk Is armed with eight Brownings were retrospectively called the Mk Ia. With the early cannon installation, jamming was a serious problem. In one engagement, only two of the 12 aircraft had been able to fire off all of their ammunition. Further cannon-armed Spitfires, with improvements to the cannon mounts, were later issued to 92 Squadron, but due to the limited magazine capacity it was eventually decided the best armament mix was two cannon and four machine guns (most of these were later converted to the first Mk Vbs).

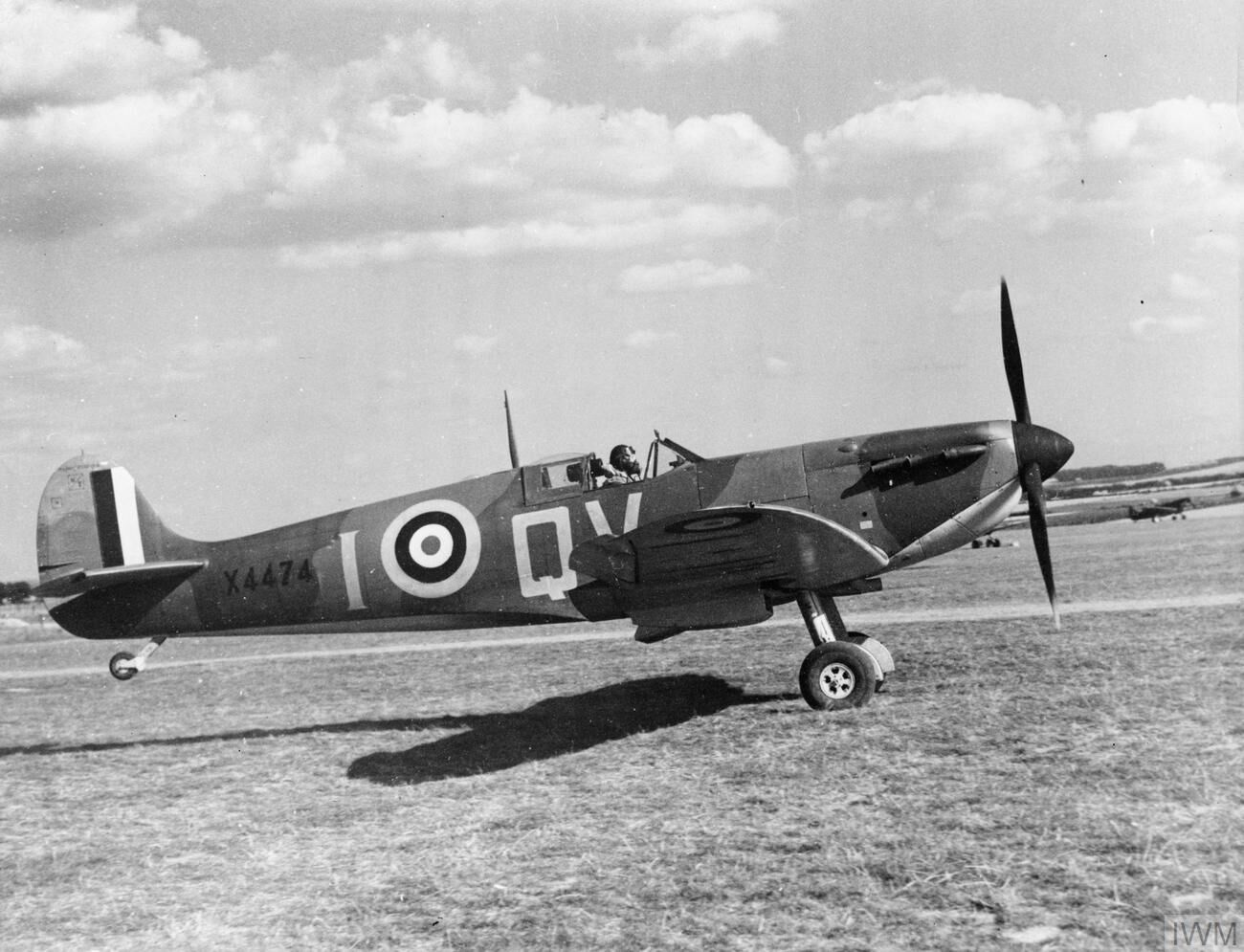
X4474, a late production Mk I of 19 Squadron flown by Sergeant Jennings in September 1940. The absence of a triangular prong on the rear of the mast indicates that VHF radio was fitted. The voltage regulator can be seen under the rear transparency. This photo makes a good comparison with K9795.

From November 1940, a decision was taken that Supermarine would start producing light-alloy covered ailerons which would replace the original fabric covered versions. However, seven months after the decision was taken to install them on all marks, Spitfires were still being delivered with the original fabric covered ailerons. From May 1941 metal ailerons were fitted to all Spitfires coming off the production lines. (Note: Combat experience had shown that fabric covered ailerons seemed to lock solid in high speed dives: this was caused by the fabric "ballooning" which, in turn, increased the control column forces needed to move them. Supermarine quickly produced a set of ailerons covered with light alloy and, in November 1940, these were fitted to a trial Mk I. Pilots reported a considerable improvement in handling at high speeds. RAF Fighter Command ordered a crash programme to have all front line Mk Is and Mk IIs fitted. However, Spitfires were still being delivered with fabric covered ailerons in June 1941. Douglas Bader had the Spitfires of his Wing fitted with the new ailerons after contacting the factory directly. Since his airfield was so close to the factory he arranged for the fighters to fly to the factory airfield and be refitted one at a time.)

=== Foreign orders: Mk Is ===
The type numbers 332, 335, 336 and 341 were given to versions of the Mk I which were to be modified to meet the requirements of Estonia, Greece, Portugal, and Turkey respectively. Estonia's order was cancelled when the Soviet Union annexed the country. The Greek and Portuguese orders were refused by the Foreign Office. The 59 aircraft for Turkey were approved, but after delivering two aircraft, the Foreign Office put a halt to that too in May 1940. The 208th production Spitfire I was sold to France and in June 1939 was delivered for evaluation.

In 1941, the British government agreed to supply Portugal with 18 Spitfire Mk 1as. These were refurbished aircraft, drawn from RAF stocks, retrofitted with TR 9 HF radios and no IFF. These arrived from late 1942 and were given the serial numbers 370 to 387, forming the XZ Esquadrilha at Tancos. These were all scrapped by the end of 1947.

=== Speed Spitfire (Type 323) ===
In 1937 ideas about modifying a Spitfire to make an attempt on the world landplane speed record were mooted. At the time the record of 352 mph (566 km/h) was held by Howard Hughes flying a Hughes H-1 racing aircraft. (Note: World Speed Records and other aviation records were and still are set by the Fédération Aéronautique Internationale (FAI). A record needs to be set over a recognised course at a set altitude to be valid. The Speed Spitfire would have come under the category CLASS C, GROUP 1d.) Although an early Spitfire I was capable of 362 mph (583 km/h), this was at a full-throttle height of 16,800 ft (5,100 m); the regulations for the world speed record demanded that the aircraft fly a 1.86-mile (2.99 km) course at an altitude no greater than 245 ft (75 m). The prototype Spitfire, which was the only one flying, was capable of 290 mph (470 km/h) at very low level. On 11 November 1937 the modified Messerschmitt Bf 109 V13 (D-IPKY), flown by Herman Wurster, raised the world speed record to 379 mph (610 km/h). It was still felt that a modified Spitfire could do better than this and, on the strength of this, the Air Ministry issued a contract to fund this work.

Accordingly, a standard Mk I K9834 (the 48th production Spitfire) was taken off the production line and modified for the attempt on the World Speed Record. All military equipment was removed and the hinged gun panels, radio door and flare chute opening were replaced with removable panels. A special "sprint" version of the Merlin II, running on a special "racing fuel" of petrol, benzol and methanol, with a small amount of tetraethyl lead was able to generate 2,100 hp (1,565 kW) for short periods. This drove a Watts coarse pitch, four bladed wood propeller of 10 ft (3.0 m) in diameter. Cooling the more powerful engine was achieved using a pressurised water system. This required a deeper radiator inside a lengthened duct which extended to the trailing edge of the starboard wing. A larger diameter oil cooler was fitted under the port wing. The wingspan was reduced to 33 ft 9 in (10.28 m) and the wingtips were rounded.

All panel lines were filled and smoothed over, all round headed rivets on the wing surfaces were replaced by flush rivets and an elongated "racing" windscreen was fitted. A tailskid replaced the tailwheel. Finally, the "Speed Spitfire" was painted in a highly polished gloss Royal Blue and Silver finish. As it turned out the finished aircraft weighed some 298 lb (135 kg) more than a standard 1938 vintage Spitfire. Also, in June 1938, the Heinkel He 100 V2 set a new record of 394.6 mph (635.0 km/h), which was very close to the maximum speed the as yet unflown Speed Spitfire was likely to achieve; the first flight of the modified Spitfire took place on 11 November 1938 and, in late February 1939, the maximum speed reached was 408 mph (657 km/h) at 3,000 ft (910 m).

Clearly further modifications would be needed. It was decided to delete the radiator and change the cooling to a "total loss" system. The upper fuel tank was removed and replaced with a combined condensor and water tank. The water was fed through the engine and back to the tank, where as much as possible would be condensed, while the overflow was ejected from the base of the engine as a jet of steam. It was calculated that the Speed Spitfire would be able to make the speed runs and land safely before the water and much reduced fuel would run out at about the same time.

Once the World Speed records were broken in quick succession by the Heinkel He 100 V8 (463.9 mph (746.6 km/h)) on 30 March 1939, and Messerschmitt Me 209 V1 (469.22 mph (755.14 km/h)) on 26 April 1939, it was decided the Speed Spitfire needed a great deal more modification to even come close to the new speed records and the project lapsed.

On the outbreak of War, the Speed Spitfire was modified to a hybrid PR Mk II with the special Merlin II being replaced by a Merlin XII driving a variable pitch de Havilland propeller, and the racing windscreen replaced by a PR wrap-around type. Nothing could be done about the reduced fuel capacity and it could never be used as an operational aircraft. Flown as a liaison aircraft between airfields in Britain during the war, K9834 was scrapped in June 1946.

=== Early reconnaissance (PR) variants ===
Before the Second World War, the conventional wisdom was to use converted bomber types for airborne photo reconnaissance. These bombers retained their defensive armament, which was vital since they were unable to avoid interception. It was soon found that modified Blenheims and Lysanders were easy targets for German fighters and heavy losses were being incurred whenever these aircraft ventured over German territory.

In August 1939, Flying Officer Maurice Longbottom, inspired by Sidney Cotton, filed a memorandum Photographic Reconnaissance of Enemy Territory in War with RAF Headquarters. In the memorandum Longbottom advocated that airborne reconnaissance would be a task better suited to fast, small aircraft which would use their speed and high service ceiling to avoid detection and interception. He proposed the use of Spitfires with the armament and radios removed and replaced with extra fuel and cameras. As a result of a meeting with Air Chief Marshal Hugh Dowding, Air Officer Commanding RAF Fighter Command, two Spitfires N3069 and N3071 were released by RAF Fighter Command and sent to the "Heston Flight", a highly secret reconnaissance unit under the command of Acting Wing Commander Cotton.

These two Spitfires were "Cottonised" by stripping out the armament and radio-transmitter, then, after filling the empty gun ports and all panel lines, the airframe was rubbed down to remove any imperfections. Coats of a special very pale blue-green called Camoutint were applied and polished. (Note: The name "Camoutint" was used by the manufacturers of the paint. This blue/green colour was later used by the RAF as the basis of a "Sky (Type S)". It was the first in a new range of smooth, eggshell finish paints replacing the drag-inducing matt finishes in use up until 1942. Photo reconnaissance units were given a free hand by the RAF to use their own camouflage schemes and colours, hence many of the earlier PR Spitfires appeared in a variety of schemes, including an overall dark "Royal Blue" for many Mediterranean-based Spitfires. Eventually an overall "PRU Blue" became the standard scheme. A pale, almost off-white "Camoutint Pink" was used on some low-flying PR Spitfires, including the Type E and some Type G and FR IXs.) Two F24 cameras with five-inch (127 mm) focal length lenses, which could photograph a rectangular area below the aircraft, were installed in the wing space vacated by the inboard guns and their ammunition containers as a stop-gap measure. Heating equipment was installed on all PR Spitfires to stop the cameras from freezing and the lenses from frosting over at altitude. These Spitfires, which later officially became the Spitfire Mk I PR Type A, had a maximum speed of 390 mph. Several of the sub-types which followed were conversions of existing fighter airframes, carried out by the Heston Aircraft Company. The Type D, which was the first specialised ultra long-range version, was the first to require that the work be carried out by Supermarine.

In the Mk I PR Type B (also known as Medium Range [MR]) conversions which followed, the F24 camera lenses were upgraded to an eight-inch (203 mm) focal length, giving images up to a third larger in scale. An extra 29 gal (132 L) fuel tank was installed in the rear fuselage. It had been envisaged that much larger cameras would be installed in the fuselage immediately behind the pilot but at the time RAF engineers believed this would upset the Spitfire's centre of gravity. Cotton was able to demonstrate that by removing lead weights, which had been installed in the extreme rear fuselage to balance the weight of the constant speed propeller units, it was possible to install cameras with longer focal-length lens in the fuselage. The Type B was the first to dispense with the heavy bullet resistant windscreen. Many of these early PR Spitfires were fitted with the Merlin XII engine and Rotol constant-speed propeller with the early, blunt spinner of the Spitfire Mk II.

The Mk I PR Type C carried a total of 144 gal (655 L) of fuel and was the first photo reconnaissance aircraft to reach as far as Kiel. The extra fuel was carried in the tank behind the pilot and in a 30 gal (136 L) blister tank under the port wing, which was counterbalanced by a camera installation in a fairing under the starboard wing. A larger oil tank was installed, necessitating the reshaping of the nose to the distinctive PR Spitfire "chin". This version was also known as the Long Range or LR Spitfire.

The Mk I PR Type D (also called the Extra Super Long Range Spitfire) was the first PR variant that was not a conversion of existing fighter airframes. The Type D carried so much fuel that it was nicknamed "the bowser". The D-shaped wing leading edges, ahead of the main spar, proved to be an ideal location for an integral tank. Accordingly, in early 1940, work started on converting the leading edges, from rib four to rib 21, by sealing off the spar, outer ribs and all skin joins allowing 57 gal (259 L) of fuel to be carried in each wing. Because the work was of low priority and with the urgent need for fighters the first two, hand-built prototypes of the PR Type Ds were not available until October. These prototypes also had a 29 gal (132 L) tank in the rear fuselage. An additional 14 gal (63 L) oil tank was fitted in the port wing. The cameras, two vertically mounted F24s with 8 inch (20.3 cm) or 20 inch (50.8 cm) lens or two vertically mounted F8s with 20-inch (510 mm) lens, were located in the rear fuselage. With the full fuel load the center of gravity was so far back the aircraft was difficult to fly until the rear fuselage tank had been emptied. Despite these difficulties the type quickly proved its worth, photographing such long distance targets as Stettin, Marseille, Trondheim and Toulon.

Once the first two Type Ds, P9551 and P9552 had proven the concept the production aircraft, which were soon renamed PR Mk IV, were modified to increase the leading edge tank capacity to 66.5 gal (302 L) and by omitting the rear fuselage tank. These aircraft were better balanced and had the more powerful Merlin 45 engine as used by the Mk V, along with heated cabins, which were a great comfort to pilots on such long flights. A total of 229 Type Ds were built.

A single Mk I PR Type E N3117 was built to address a requirement for oblique close-ups as opposed to high altitude vertical pictures. This conversion carried an F24 camera in a fairing under each wing. These faced forward, were splayed outwards slightly and aimed downwards at about 15 degrees below the horizontal. A 29 gal (132 L) fuel tank was fitted in the rear fuselage. N3117 proved most useful as it was able to photograph targets under weather conditions that would make high altitude photography impossible and experience with this aircraft resulted in the development of the Type G.

Mk I PR Type F was an interim "super-long-range" version which entered service in July 1940, pending the Type D. The Type F carried a 30 gal fuel tank under each wing, plus a 29 gal tank in the rear fuselage, as well as having an enlarged oil tank under the nose. It was a useful enough improvement that nearly all existing Type Bs and Type Cs were eventually converted to the Type F standard. Operating from East Anglia it was just able to reach, photograph and return from Berlin. 15 of these were based on the Mk V airframe.

The Mk I PR Type G was the first fighter-reconnaissance version and performed a similar low-level tactical role to the Type E. One oblique F24 camera, with either an eight-inch or 14 inch lens, was fitted facing to port, between fuselage frames 13 and 14. Two vertical F24 cameras were also installed in the fuselage. The forward camera, installed below the oblique, could be fitted with a five-inch or an eight-inch lens while the rear camera could be fitted with an eight-inch or a 14-inch lens. A 29 gal (132 L) fuel tank was fitted just behind the pilot. The first PR Gs were converted from Mk I airframes and their Merlin II engines replaced with Merlin 45s. Late PR Gs were converted from Mk V airframes. The Type G was fully armed with 8 × .303" Brownings and retained the armoured windscreen and gunsight.

A feature of most PR Spitfires were the specially modified "Blown" canopies which incorporated large lateral teardrop shaped blisters, allowing the pilots a much clearer view to the rear and below, vital for sighting the cameras. The lateral cameras were aimed by lining up a tiny +, marked on the side of the blister, with a fine black line painted on the port outer aileron. On all unarmed PR conversions the gunsight was replaced by a small camera control box from which the pilot could turn the cameras on, control the time intervals between photos and set the number of exposures.

In 1941, a new system of mark numbers was introduced, independent of those used for the fighter versions. Also, several PR conversions were re-converted to later PR types.

- The Type C became the PR Mk III.
- The Type D became the PR Mk IV.
- The Type E became the PR Mk V.
- The Type F became the PR Mk VI.
- The Type G became the PR Mk VII.

In all, 1,567 Mk Is were built (1,517 by Supermarine between May 1938 and March 1941, 50 by Westland, July to September 1941).

=== Mk II (Type 329) ===
Media related to Supermarine Spitfire Mark II at Wikimedia Commons

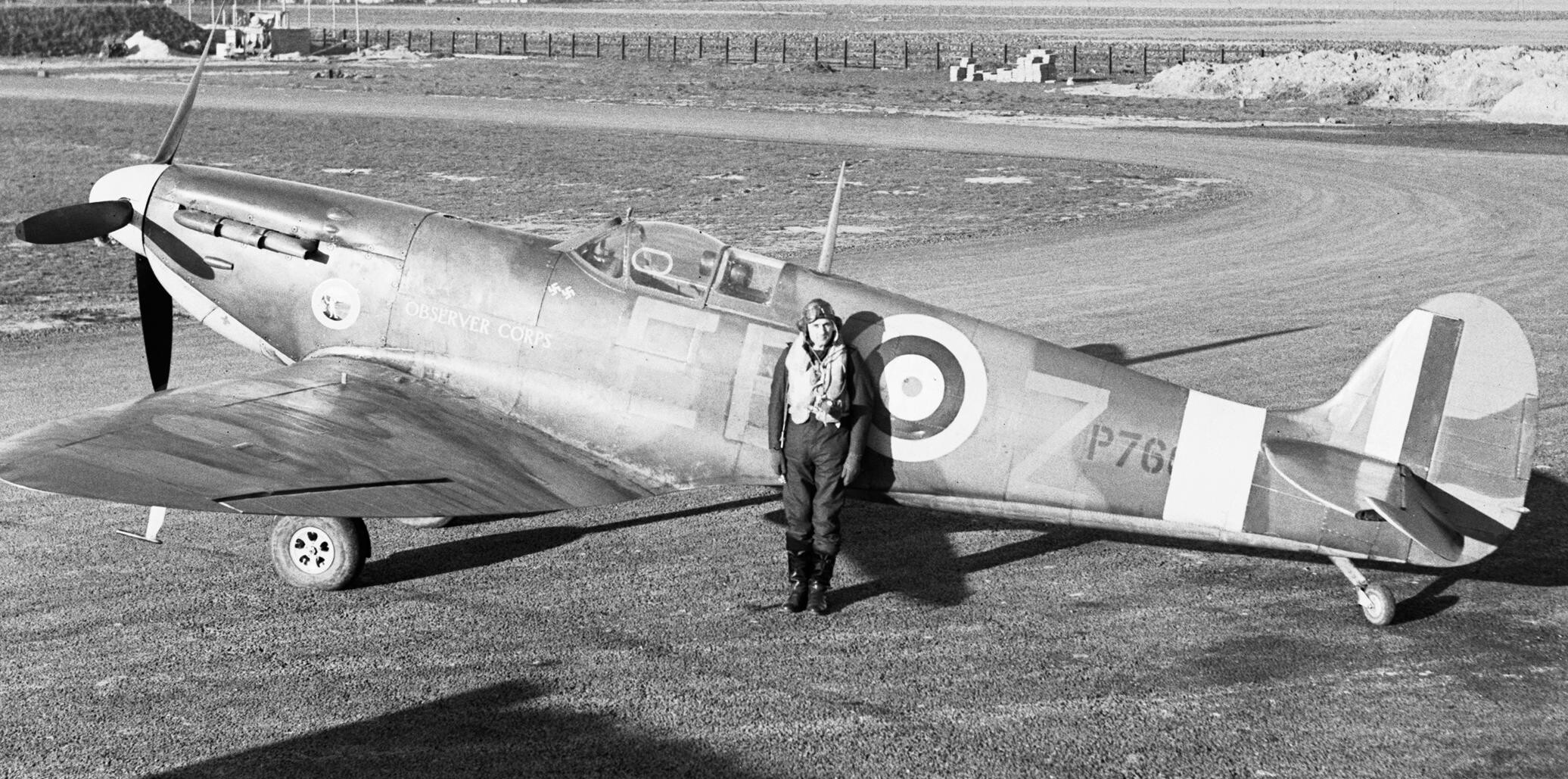
Spitfire Mk IIa P7666 of 41 Squadron. P7666 "Observer Corps" was flown by Squadron Leader Donald Finlay; Finlay shot down two Bf 109s in P7666 in November 1940.

In the summer of 1939 an early Mk I K9788 was fitted with a new version of the Merlin, the XII. With the success of the trial it was decided to use this version of the Merlin in the Mk II which, it was decided, would be the first version to be produced exclusively by the huge new Lord Nuffield shadow factory at Castle Bromwich.

Chief among the changes was the upgraded 1,175 horsepower (876 kW) Merlin XII engine. This engine included a Coffman engine starter, instead of the electric system of earlier and some later versions of the Merlin, and it required a small "teardrop" blister on the forward starboard cowling. The Merlin XII was cooled by a 70% to 30% water glycol mix, rather than pure glycol used for earlier Merlin versions.

In early 1940 Spitfire Is of 54 and 66 Squadrons were fitted with Rotol manufactured wide-bladed propellers of 10 ft 9 in (3.27 m) diameter, which were recognisable by a bigger, more rounded spinner: the decision was made that the new propeller would also be used exclusively by the Mk II. This engine/propeller combination increased top speed over the late Mk I by about 6–7 mph below 17,000 feet (5,200 m), and improved climb rate. Due to all of the weight increases maximum speed performance was still lower than that of early Mk Is, but combat capability was far better. The Mk II was produced in IIa eight-gun and IIb cannon armed versions. Deliveries were very rapid, and they quickly replaced all remaining Mk Is in service, which were then sent to Operational Training Units. The RAF had re-equipped with the new version by April 1941. The Rotol propeller units were later supplemented by de Havilland constant-speed units similar to those fitted to Mk Is.

A small number of Mk IIs were converted to "Long Range" Spitfires in early 1941. These could be recognised by the fixed 40 gal (182 L) fuel tank which was fitted under the port wing. With a full tank manoeuvrability was reduced, maximum speed was 26 mph (42 km/h) lower and the climb rate and service ceiling were also reduced. Several squadrons used this version to provide long-range bomber escort. Once the Mk II was taken out of front line service, 50 of them were converted for air-sea rescue work, at first under the designation Mk IIc (type 375) but later referred to as the ASR Mk II. The Merlin XII was replaced by the Mark XX, a "rescue pack" was fitted in the flare chute and smoke marker bombs were carried under the port wing.

A total of 921 Mk IIs were built, all by Castle Bromwich. A small number of Mk IIs were converted to Mk Vs. (Note: A Spitfire Mk II, P8563, which had crashed into a peat bog in 1942, killing the pilot, was unearthed on 9 March 2008 by a group of aviation archaeologists.)

=== Mk III (Type 330) ===
The Mk III was the first attempt to improve the basic Spitfire design and introduced several features which were used on later marks. Powered by a Rolls-Royce RM 2SM, later known as the Merlin XX, developing 1,390 hp (1,036 kW) due to its two-speed supercharger, the wingspan was reduced to 30 ft 6 in (9.3 m) and the area reduced to 220 square feet (20.4 sq m) while the overall length was increased to 30 ft 4 in (9.2 m). The strengthened main undercarriage was raked forward two inches, increasing ground stability, and had flaps to fully enclose the wheels when retracted. The tailwheel was also made fully retractable. The windscreen was redesigned, with a built-in, internal laminated glass, bulletproof panel and optically flat, laminated glass quarter panels.

The first Mk III N3297 was first flown on 16 March 1940. In early 1941 a Spitfire Mk V, W3237, was converted to a Mk III, although it didn't have the retractable tailwheel. W3237 replaced N3297 when the latter was delivered to Rolls-Royce; W3237 went on to become a test aircraft and was still being used in September 1944. Although the new Spitfire was developed to replace the earlier marks on the production lines, a decision to allocate the limited supplies of Merlin XX to the Hurricane II series meant that the Mark III lapsed. Priority then focused on the Mark V series. The Mk III with the Merlin XX was capable of a maximum speed of 400 mph (640 km/h) at 21,000 ft (6,400 m). N3297 became the power-plant development airframe; the wings were replaced with standard Type A and the aircraft was delivered to Rolls-Royce at Hucknall. A prototype Merlin 60 two-stage engine was subsequently installed, making this aircraft (renumbered the type 348) a prototype Mk IX.

=== Mk V (Types 331, 349 and 352) ===
Media related to Supermarine Spitfire Mark V at Wikimedia Commons

Spitfire LF Mk Vb, BL479, flown by Group Captain M.W.S Robinson, station commander of RAF Northolt, August 1943. This Spitfire has the wide bladed Rotol propeller, the internal armoured windscreen and "clipped" wings.

Late in 1940, the RAF predicted that the advent of the pressurised Junkers Ju 86P bomber series over Britain would be the start of a new sustained high altitude bombing offensive by the Luftwaffe, in which case development was put in hand for a pressurised version of the Spitfire, with a new version of the Merlin (the Mk VI). It would take some time to develop the new fighter and an emergency stop-gap measure was needed as soon as possible: this was the Mk V.

The basic Mk V was a Mk I with the Merlin 45 series engine. This engine delivered 1,440 hp (1,074 kW) at take-off, and incorporated a new single-speed single-stage supercharger design. Improvements to the carburettor also allowed the Spitfire to use zero gravity manoeuvres without any problems with fuel flow. Several Mk I and Mk II airframes were converted to Mk V standard by Supermarine and started equipping fighter units from early 1941. The majority of the Mk Vs were built at Castle Bromwich.

Three versions of the Mk V were produced, with several sub-series:

==== Mk Va (Type 331) ====
The Va continued to use the Type A wing with 8 .303" Browning machine guns. This version could reach a top speed of 375 mph (603 km/h) at 20,800 ft (6,300 m), and could climb to 20,000 ft (6,100 m) in 7.1 minutes. A total of 94 were built. One well known Va was W3185 D-B flown by Douglas Bader when commanding the Tangmere Wing in 1941. He was shot down in this aircraft (possibly by friendly fire) during a "Circus" (a wing of fighters escorting a small number of bombers) over Northern France on 9 August 1941 and spent the rest of the war as a POW. In April 1941 two Spitfire Vas R7347 and W3119 were sent to Wright Field, Dayton, Ohio USA as sample aircraft. Both Spitfires were tested by NACA; one series of tests included the fitting of special NACA "jet-propulsion" exhaust stacks.

==== Mk Vb and Vb (trop) (Types 349 and 352) ====
The Vb became the main production version of the Mark Vs. Along with the new Merlin 45 series the B wing was fitted as standard. As production progressed changes were incorporated, some of which became standard on all later Spitfires. Production started with several Mk Ibs which were converted to Mk Vbs by Supermarine. Starting in early 1941 the round section exhaust stacks were changed to a fishtail type, marginally increasing exhaust thrust. Some late production Vbs and Vcs were fitted with six shorter exhaust stacks per side, similar to those of Spitfire IXs and Seafire IIIs; this was originally stipulated as applying specifically to Vb(trop)s. After some initial problems with the original Mk I size oil coolers, a bigger oil cooler was fitted under the port wing; this could be recognised by a deeper housing with a circular entry. From mid-1941 alloy covered ailerons became a universal fitting.

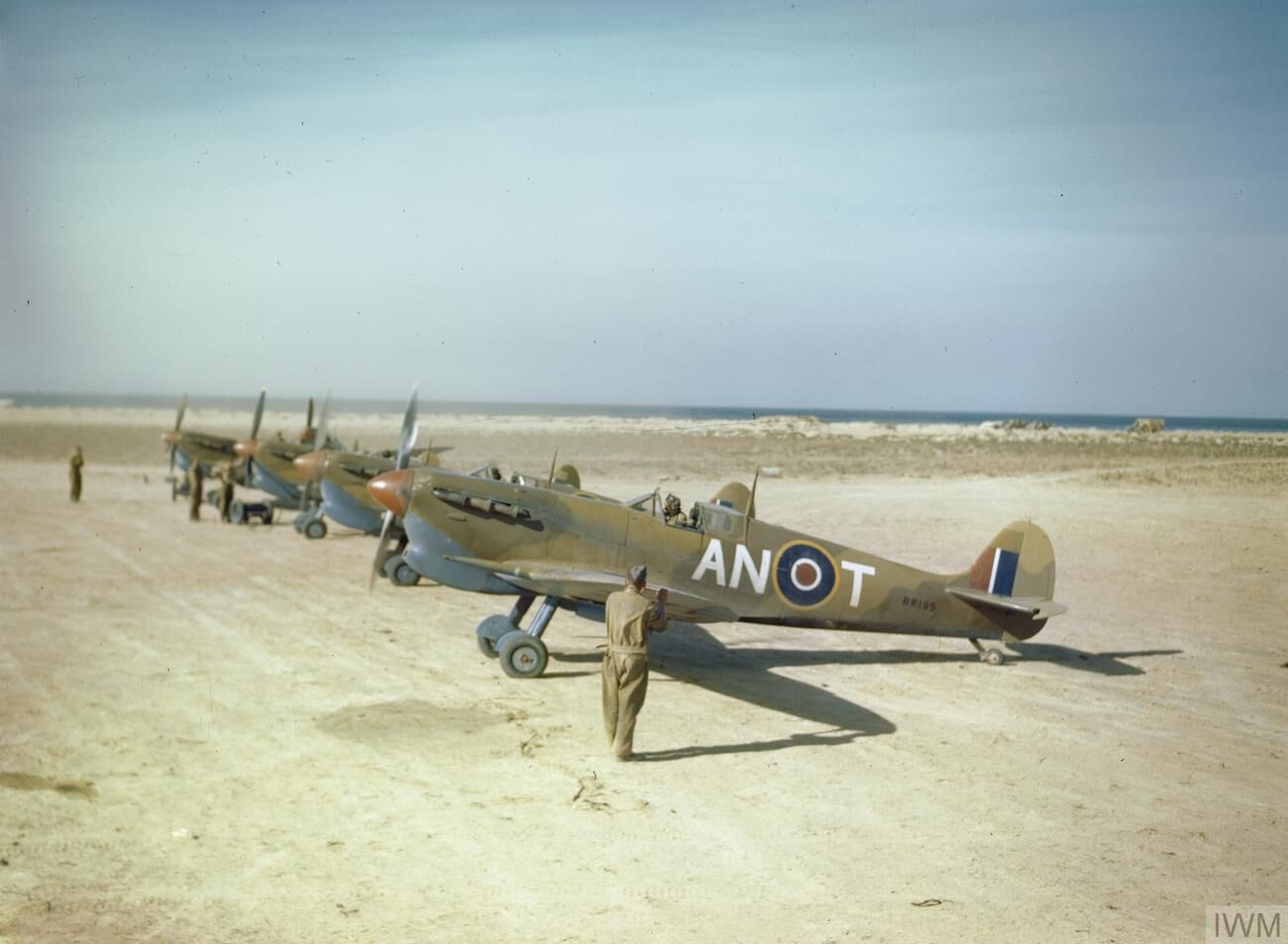
Spitfire Vc(trop), fitted with Vokes filters and disc wheels, of 417 Squadron RCAF in Tunisia in 1943.

A constant flow of modifications were made as production progressed. A "blown" cockpit hood, manufactured by Malcolm, was introduced in an effort to further increase the pilot's head-room and visibility. Many mid to late production Vbs – and all Vcs – used the modified, improved windscreen assembly with the integral bullet resistant centre panel and flat side screens introduced with the Mk III. Because the rear frame of this windscreen was taller than that of the earlier model the cockpit hoods were not interchangeable and could be distinguished by the wider rear framing on the hood used with the late-style windscreen.

Different propeller types were fitted, according to where the Spitfire V was built: Supermarine and Westland manufactured Vbs and Vcs used 10 ft 9 in (3.28 m) diameter, 3 bladed de Havilland constant speed units, with narrow metal blades, while Castle Bromwich manufactured Vbs and Vcs were fitted with a wide bladed Rotol constant speed propeller of either 10 ft 9 in (3.28 m) diameter, with metal blades, or (on late production Spitfires) 10 ft 3 in (3.12 m) diameter, with broader, "Jablo" (compressed wood) blades. The Rotol spinners were longer and more pointed than the de Havilland leading to a 3.5 in (8.9 cm) increase in overall length. The Rotol propellers allowed a modest speed increase over 20,000 ft (6,100 m) and an increase in the service ceiling. A large number of Spitfire VBs were fitted with "gun heater intensifier" systems on the exhaust stacks. These piped additional heated air into the gun bays. There was a short tubular intake on the front of the first stack and a narrow pipe led into the engine cowling from the rear exhaust.

The Vb series were the first Spitfires able to carry a range of specially designed slipper-type drop tanks which were fitted underneath the wing centre-section. Small hooks were fitted just forward of the inboard flaps. When the tank was released, these hooks caught the trailing edge of the tank, swinging it clear of the fuselage.

With the advent of the superb Focke-Wulf Fw 190 in August 1941 the Spitfire was for the first time truly outclassed, hastening the development of the "interim" Mk IX. To counter this threat, especially at lower altitudes, the Vb was the first production version of the Spitfire to use clipped wingtips as an option, reducing the wingspan to 32 ft 2 in (9.8 m). The clipped wings increased the roll rate and airspeed at lower altitudes. Several versions of the Merlin 45/50 family were used, including the Merlin 45M which had a smaller "cropped" supercharger impeller and boost increased to +18 lb. This engine produced 1,585 hp (1,182 kW) at 2,750 ft (838 m), increasing the L.F VB's maximum rate of climb to 4,720 ft/min (21.6 m/s) at 2,000 ft (610 m).

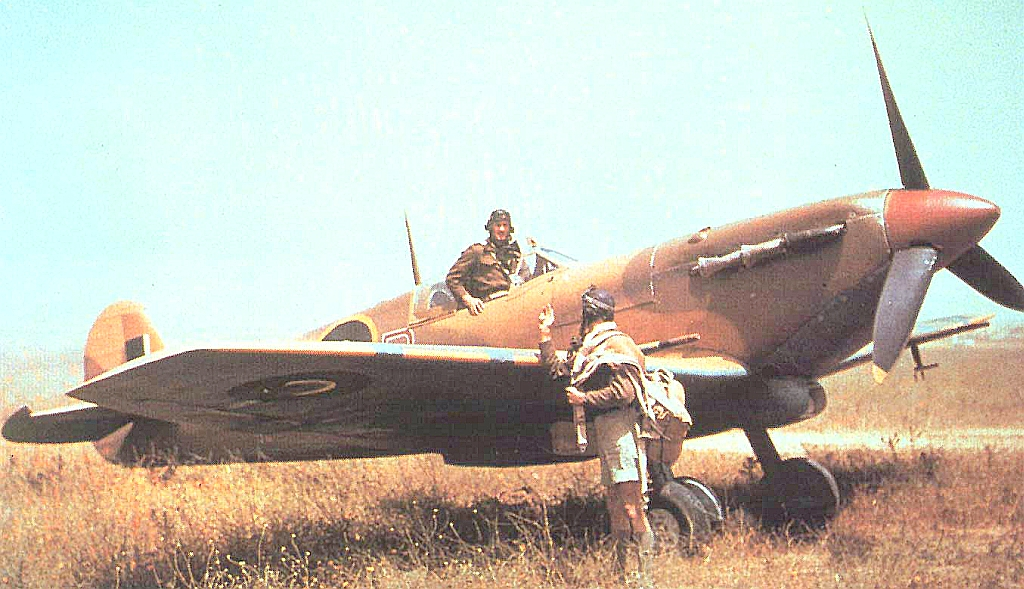
Vb Trop of 40 Squadron SAAF fitted with the streamlined version of the Aboukir filter, a broad-bladed, 10 ft 3 in (3.12 m) diameter Rotol propeller, and clipped wings.

The Mk Vb(trop) (or type 352) could be identified by the large Vokes air filter fitted under the nose; the reduced speed of the air to the supercharger had a detrimental effect on the performance of the aircraft, reducing the top speed by 8 mph (13 km/h) and the climb rate by 600 ft/min (3.04 m/s), but the decreased performance was considered acceptable. This variant was also fitted with a larger oil tank and desert survival gear behind the pilot's seat. A new desert camouflage scheme was applied. Many Vb(trop)s were modified by 103 MU (Maintenance Unit-RAF depots in which factory fresh aircraft were brought up to service standards before being delivered to squadrons) at Aboukir, Egypt by replacing the Vokes filter with locally manufactured Aboukir-type filters, which were lighter and more streamlined. Two designs of these filters can be identified in photos; one had a bulky, squared off filter housing while the other was more streamlined. These aircraft were usually fitted with the wide blade Rotol propeller and clipped wings.^{[h]}

==== Mk Vc and Vc (trop) (Types 349 and 352/6) ====
As well as having most of the standard Mk V features this version had several important changes over the earlier Mk V, most of which were first tested on the Mk III. These included the re-stressed and strengthened fuselage structure and the new windscreen design, which was also used on some Vb Spitfires. The Vc also introduced the Type C or "Universal" wing along with the revised main undercarriage; the tops of these wings featured large, bulged fairings to provide clearance for the ammunition feed motors of two Hispano cannon. Because two cannon were seldom fitted, these fairings were later reduced in size to more streamlined shapes. A deeper radiator fairing was fitted under the starboard wing and a larger oil cooler with a deeper, kinked air outlet was fitted underneath the port wing. In addition more armour plating was added, protecting the bottom of the pilot's seat and the wing ammunition boxes.

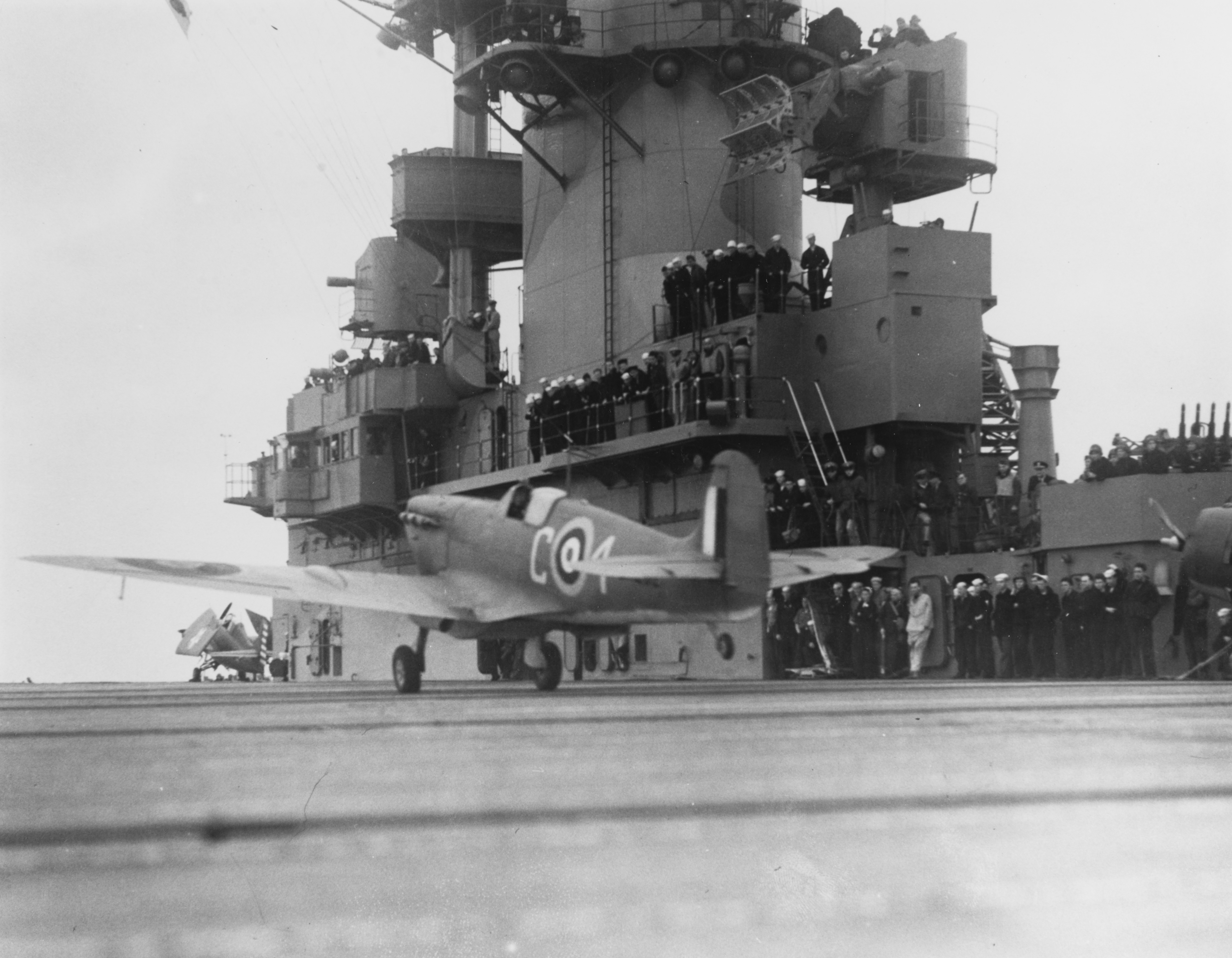
Spitfire Vc launching from Wasp during Operation Bowery. This was part of the first contingent of Spitfires which were supplied to the RAF on Malta. A 60-gallon "slipper" type drop tank was mounted under the centre section and the top surfaces have been painted blue or blue/gray to help camouflage the Spitfire during the long flight across the Mediterranean.

The first Spitfire modified to carry bombs was a Malta-based Vc, EP201, which was able to carry one 250 lb (110 kg) bomb under each wing. In a note to the Air Ministry Air Vice Marshal Keith Park wrote "[w]e designed the bomb gear so that there was no loss of performance when the bombs were dropped. Unlike the Hurricane bomb gear our Spitfire throws away all external fittings with the exception of a steel rib which protrudes less than one inch from the wing."

One Vc (trop) BP985 was modified by 103 MU as a high altitude fighter capable of intercepting the Ju 86P photo reconnaissance aircraft which were overflying Allied naval bases in Egypt. This aircraft was stripped of all unnecessary weight, including all armour plating and the Hispano cannon, while the compression ratio of the Merlin 46 was increased by modifying the cylinder block. A four bladed de Havilland propeller was fitted along with an Aboukir filter, a larger 9.5 gallon oil tank and extended wingtips.

The first Spitfire to be sent overseas in large numbers was the Mk Vc (trop). The majority of these were used by Allied squadrons in the Mediterranean theatre (including North Africa), Burma and in Australia with No. 1 Fighter Wing RAAF. The Vc initially suffered a high rate of mechanical failure in Australia, due to corrosion in engine cooling pipes that were unfilled and exposed to salt air, while being shipped from the UK.

With the advent of the Mk IX, few Mk Vc Spitfires saw combat over Europe.

==== Spitfire V production and overseas shipments ====
A total of 300 Mk Vc (trop)s were shipped to Australia for the RAAF; the first of these arrived in late 1942. A total of 143 Spitfire Vb (including Mk II conversions) were supplied to Soviet Union. Portugal received two lots of Spitfire VBs; 33 refurbished ex-RAF aircraft started arriving in early 1944 and a further and final shipment of 60 mainly clipped wing LF Mk Vbs arrived in 1947. All were retrofitted with TR 9 HF radios and had no IFF. The last of these Spitfires were taken out of service in 1952. Twelve were delivered to Royal Egyptian Air Force.

In 1944 enough Spitfire Vb (trop)s to equip one squadron were supplied to Turkey. Some were later fitted with the larger, pointed rudder developed for later Merlin-powered Spitfires. These flew alongside of the Focke-Wulf Fw 190A-3s which had been supplied to Turkey by Germany.

In total, production was 6,479, consisting of 94 Mk Va, built by Supermarine, 3,911 Mk Vb, (776 by Supermarine, 2,995 Castle Bromwich and 140 Westland) and 2,467 Mk Vc, (478 Supermarine, 1,494 Castle Bromwich, 495 Westland) plus 15 PR Type F by Castle Bromwich.

==== German Daimler Benz powered Spitfire Vb ====
In November 1942 a Spitfire Vb EN830 NX-X of 131 Squadron made a forced landing in a turnip field at Dielament Manor, Trinity, Jersey, under German occupation at the time. This aircraft was repairable and started being test flown in German markings and colours at the Luftwaffe's central research facilities at Erprobungsstelle Rechlin. There it was proposed that the Spitfire's Merlin engine should be replaced by a Daimler-Benz DB 605A inverted V-12 engine; the Spitfire was sent to Echterdingen, south of Stuttgart, where Daimler-Benz operated a flight testing division.

When the Merlin engine was removed it was discovered that the fuselage cross section was virtually identical to that of the engine nacelle of a Messerschmitt Bf 110G. Consequently, a new engine support structure was built onto the Spitfire's fuselage and the DB 605 engine and cowling panels added. A propeller unit and supercharger air intake from a Bf 109G completed the installation.

Other changes made were to replace the Spitfire instruments with German types, and to change the 12-volt electrical system to the German 24-volt type. In this form the Daimler-Benz Spitfire started flying in early 1944. It was popular with German pilots and was flown regularly until destroyed in a USAAF bombing raid on 14 August 1944.

=== Mk VI (Type 350) ===
Media related to Supermarine Spitfire Mark VI at Wikimedia Commons

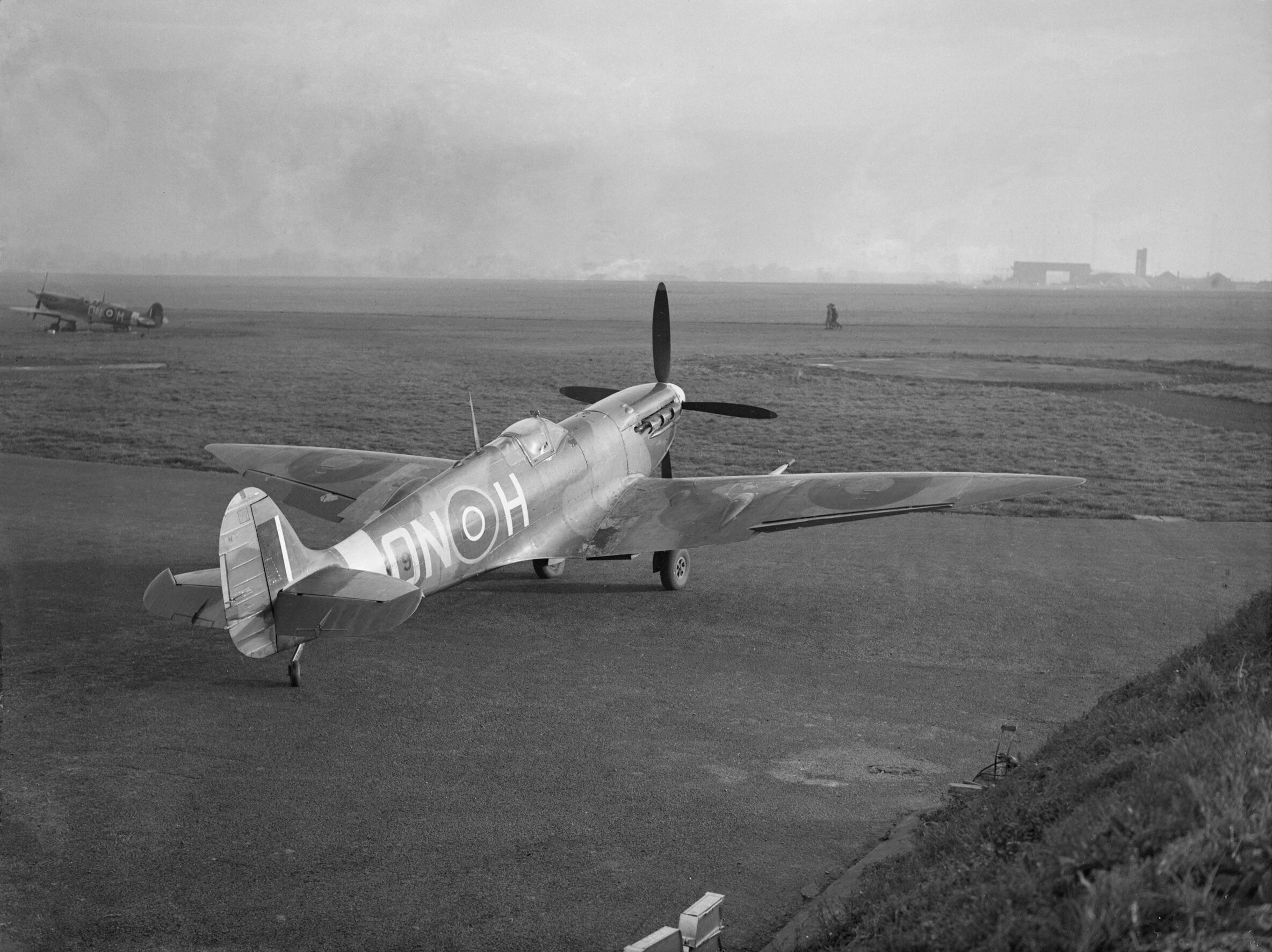
Mk VI of No. 124 Squadron RAF at RAF North Weald c. 1942

At the time that the Mk V was placed in production there were growing fears that the Luftwaffe was about to start mass-producing very high flying bombers such as the Junkers Ju 86, which could fly above the reach of most fighters of the time. It was decided that a new Spitfire variant would be required with improved high altitude performance. During a meeting held at the RAE at Farnborough on 17 February 1941 the Air Ministry asked "that a Spitfire should be provided with a pressure cabin capable of maintaining a pressure differential of 1 pound per square inch (69 hectopascals; 0.068 standard atmospheres) at 40,000 feet (12,000 m)." (Note: The specially developed Westland Welkin high altitude fighter provided 3.5 psi (240 hPa; 0.24 atm) at 45,000 feet (14,000 m).) A Marshall-manufactured compressor was to be used, and it was agreed that the sliding canopy could be replaced by one which could not be slid open, as long as it could be jettisoned by the pilot.

The pressurised cabin was used to counter the physiological problems encountered by pilots at high altitudes. The cabin was not like the fully pressurised cabin of a modern airliner; the pressure differential provided by the modified cockpit of the VI was only 2 psi (140 hPa; 0.14 atm) (which was double the Air Ministry requirement). To achieve this, the forward and rear cockpit bulkheads were completely enclosed, with all control and electrical cables exiting though special rubber sealing grommets. In addition, the side cockpit door was replaced with alloy skin and the canopy was no longer a sliding unit: externally there were no slide rails. Once the pilot was in, the canopy was locked in place with four toggles and sealed with an inflatable rubber tube. It could be jettisoned by the pilot in an emergency. The windscreen of production Mk VIs was the same as the type fitted to the Mark III and some Mk Vs although it was fitted with an inward opening clear-view panel on the port quarter pane. The effect was to make 37,000 ft (11,000 m) seem like 28,000 ft (8,500 m) to the pilot, who would still have to wear an oxygen mask. Pressurisation was achieved by a Marshall-manufactured compressor located on the starboard side of the engine, fed by a long intake below the starboard exhaust stubs. Mk VIs were built with the Coffman cartridge starter, with a small teardrop fairing just ahead of the compressor intake.

The engine was a Rolls-Royce Merlin 47 driving a four-bladed Rotol propeller of 10 ft 9 in (3.27 m) diameter; the new propeller provided increased thrust at high altitudes, where the atmosphere is much thinner. To help smooth out airflow around the wingtips the standard rounded types were replaced by extended, pointed versions extending the wingspan to 40 ft 2 in (12.2 m). Otherwise the wings were Type B.

The maximum speed of the Mk VI was 356 mph (573 km/h) at 21,800 ft (6,600 m). However, because of the limitations of the single stage supercharger, at 38,000 ft (11,600 m) the maximum speed had fallen away to 264 mph (425 km/h). The service ceiling was 39,200 ft (11,900 m).

The threat of a sustained high altitude campaign by the Luftwaffe did not materialise and only 100 of the Mk VIs were built by Supermarine. Only two units, 124 Squadron and 616 Squadron, were fully equipped with this version, although several other units used them in small numbers as a stop-gap. More often than not, the Spitfire VIs were used at lower altitudes where they were outperformed by conventional Spitfires. At high altitudes it was discovered that modified Spitfire Vs could perform almost as well as the Mk VI. At low levels especially, pilots were often forced to fly with the canopy removed because the cockpit would get uncomfortably hot and they were not confident it would be possible to jettison the canopy in case of an emergency.

In 1943, five Spitfire VIs (registrations BS106, BS124, BS133, BS134, and BS149) were converted to improvised PR Mk.VIs by 680 Squadron in Egypt. These aircraft had been 'tropicalised' using the same bulky Vokes filter and other equipment used by Spitfire Vb (trops), as well as being painted in a 'desert' camouflage scheme.

By the time these aircraft arrived they were no longer required to intercept high-flying Junkers Ju 86P reconnaissance aircraft, but there was a need for a pressurised RAF photo reconnaissance aircraft to carry out missions over Crete and the rest of Greece. 103 MU at Aboukir carried out the modifications by removing the armament and installing vertical F8 cameras in the rear fuselage. These Spitfires were used a few times in April and May 1943 but were withdrawn from service by August. They were the first pressurised PR Spitfires.

=== PR Mk XIII (Type 367) ===
The PR Mk XIII was an improvement on the earlier PR Type G with the same camera system but a new engine, the Merlin 32, which was specially rated for low-altitude flight. It carried a light armament of 4 × .303" Browning machine guns. The first prototype Mk XIII was tested in March 1943.

Twenty-six Mk XIIIs were converted from either PR Type G, Mk II or Mk Vs. They were used for low level reconnaissance in preparation for the Normandy landings.

== Production ==
The majority of the early PR Spitfires were converted from existing airframes and are not listed separately. Because the first Mk Vs were converted from Mk I and some Mk II airframes the first true production Spitfire V is listed.

Production by Mark
Mark	Built by	Numbers built	Notes
Prototype	Supermarine	1	K5054. First flight 5 May 1936.
Ia, Ib	Supermarine, Westland	1,567	First production Spitfire K9787 first flew 14 May 1938.
IIa, IIb	Castle Bromwich	921	First CB built Spitfire P7280, June 1940.
III	Supermarine	2	N3297 converted from Mk I, W3237 converted from Mk V.
Va, Vb, Vc	Supermarine, Castle Bromwich, Westland	6,487	First Mk V; P8532 (Vb) June 1941.
VI	Supermarine	100	First Mk VI AB136 December 1941.

== See also ==
- Allied technological cooperation during World War II
- Military history of the United Kingdom during World War II
- Rolls-Royce Merlin and Griffon
- Supermarine

Related development

- Supermarine Spitfire (late Merlin-powered variants)
- Supermarine Spitfire (Griffon-powered variants)
- Supermarine Spitfire variants: specifications, performance and armament
- Seafang
- Seafire
- Spiteful
- Supermarine S.6B
