= Ernest David Weiss =

British Jewish concert pianist and transport economist

- Ernest David Weiss
- Born: 7 December 1902; Breslau, German Empire
- Died: 19 January 1982 (aged 79)
- Other name: Walter Lock
- Occupation: Soviet intelligence officer
- Espionage activity
- Allegiance: GRU
- Codename: Walter Lock

Ernest David Weiss (7 December 1902 in Breslau – 19 January 1982) was a Polish-Jew naturalised British transport economist who became a Soviet espionage agent, spying in the United Kingdom and possibly the United States. Weiss worked initially for the Communist International (Comintern) in the 1930s and later worked for the Red Orchestra espionage network through Comintern agent Henry Robinson in the early 1940s. In 1947, Weiss's name was discovered through an analysis of the Robinson papers by MI5. After his arrest and interrogation, Weiss proved to be remarkably cooperative, and in return for a confession he was promised immunity by MI5. He was found to have been a key individual in Soviet intelligence in the United Kingdom during the interwar period but had ceased working as an agent in 1941. He named many other contacts, and this led to further arrests. Weiss's cryptonym was Jean. After his confession, he retired from espionage work to work as part of piano double act that played in variety shows, music halls and theatres that regularly toured the UK. He lived in London until his death in 1982.

== Life ==
Weiss was the child of Arnold Weiss, a merchant in Breslau and Emma née Tisch. Weiss was educated at St. John's Gymnasium in Breslau from 1909 to 1921. St. John's accepted Jewish pupils without question. In 1922, Weiss matriculated at the University of Breslau to study the economics of transport. In 1927, he was awarded a Diplom. Deciding to continue his education at Breslau in 1930, he was awarded a Doctor of Science in 1932. While at university, he joined the Communist Party of Germany (KPD).

== Espionage career ==
While in Frankfurt in May or June 1931, Weiss was contacted by Hans Demetz who offered him a job, if he was interested in travelling overseas for work. In effect, he was recruited as an intelligence agent. Demetz was a Breslau native and a contemporary of Weiss at Breslau University, who had been recruited as a Red Army Intelligence agent in 1925. After Weiss graduated, he worked as a manager or buyer in a number of retail stores in Frankfurt and later in Cologne. In January 1932, Weiss left Germany and arrived in Paris, where he was introduced to "Harry I", an unidentified Red Army agent based in Paris, who was his controller. On 11 May 1932, Weiss arrived in the UK, ostensibly to study at the London School of Economics researching the economics of air transport, but in reality to spy. Harry I contacted two seamen, who were couriers for the group, to inform them of Weiss' arrival. He also introduced Weiss to Robert Gordon Switz on 17 September 1933 at Switz's apartment in Kensington Gardens. In the autumn of 1935, Weiss began working for "Harry II", also an unidentified Paris based Red Army agent, after Weiss met him in a hotel in Enge, Zurich. Harry II passed the intelligence he received from Weiss to Soviet intelligence via the Military attaché in the Soviet embassy in Paris. By July 1936, Weiss was working as the assistant editor and article author on the Railway Gazette and the South African Journal of Economics. In 1936, he received intelligence detailing the production of aeroplanes from two of his most important informants, "Vernon" and "Meredith", who knew him as the alias "Walter Lock". Vernon was Wilfrid Vernon, who was then a technical assistant for the Royal Aircraft Establishment (RAE) at Farnborough Airport, and would later become a Labour MP. Meredith was Frederick William Meredith, a British engineer and Marxist, who was also working at the RAE. Both were members of the Communist Party of Britain. In November 1936, Harry II introduced the Belgian communist Germaine Schneider to Weiss in South Kensington, London. Schneider was the group's courier from 1936 to 1939, meeting Weiss at a hotel in South Kensington several more times to exchange intelligence.

In the spring of 1940, Weiss applied for naturalisation, the first of several attempts, but his application was rejected. He was interned in October 1940 before being released in December 1940 to serve in the Auxiliary Military Pioneer Corps. In January 1941, he again applied for naturalisation and was again rejected. In July 1942, he was commissioned as a Lieutenant to serve the Royal Engineers. In 1941, Weiss ceased working as an espionage agent. In December 1944, he was admitted to hospital with angina and diagnosed with Coronary thrombosis. On 27 November 1945, he was released from the military. In May 1946, he registered as an "alien" who worked as a Variety show pianist. In July 1946, he was finally accepted for naturalisation. Weiss became part of the piano double-act "Marek and Vyse" with Roman Marek that toured in music halls and theatres around the UK.

== Discovery ==
In 1947, Weiss's name was discovered when the captured papers belonging to Henry Robinson, known as the Robinson Papers, were discovered in a MI5 archive. Michael Friend Serpell, a career MI5 officer who was an expert on Soviet espionage, and another career MI5 officer, Robert Hembleys-Scales, undertook a detailed analysis of the papers and in the process discovered the existence of a Soviet GRU espionage network in the UK, and identified some of the spies that worked with Weiss.

The papers had been available in a MI5 archive for two years, but either by accident or design they had remained hidden. When the report was published, the task of finding Weiss and the other agents was assigned to case officer Roger Hollis. On 26 March 1947, Hollis said, "we are most anxious to avoid any chance of alarming Weiss and therefore, prefer the telephone check to other methods in this case". The order was repeated in June 1947. Weiss and his associates were put under extensive surveillance by the security services.

== Interrogation ==
On 30 January 1948, Weiss was interrogated at an MI5 safe house at 19 Rugby Mansions, Hammersmith. During the interrogation, Weiss told MI5 the following:

- That an agent with the code name "Andre" was Communist International (Comintern) agent Henry Robinson. Robinson took over the UK network in 1937.
- The identity of Hans Demetz. Demetz was a career Soviet Fourth department espionage agent who had joined the agency in 1925.
- That Weiss met David Rockefeller through Saul Rae and had played tennis with him.
- The identity of "Vernon". Wilfrid Vernon was a Labour party politician who was in power at the time. Vernon acted as the "cipher contact" between the Royal Aircraft Establishment and the Communist Party of Great Britain in London.
- The identity of "Meredith", who was Frederick William Meredith, a Dublin engineer. Weiss revealed that Meredith had travelled to the Soviet Union along with eight other people from the RAE in May 1932 and returned to work in June 1932.
- That he knew the economist Samuel Landon Barron of the London School of Economics and had recruited him for work in the United States. Barron had obtained a position at the War Trade Department of the British Embassy in Washington and had worked there from 1938 to 1941. Barron had used a reference from Lauchlin Currie to obtain the position.

Vernon was already known to the intelligence community. In 1938, he had been dismissed from the RAE after being charged with violating the Official Secrets Act 1911 when he took home official documents that should have remained secret. MI5 Director-General Percy Sillitoe had informed the prime minister Clement Attlee, due to what they considered the sensitive nature of the case. Attlee decided to take no further action on Vernon as Sillitoe considered him a low risk, due to Vernon conducting no further espionage after 1937 and the official documents being considered relatively low-grade. When Weiss's espionage was discovered, MI5 again decided to inform Attlee. When MI5 officer JH Marriott told Attlee of the nature of the espionage, Attlee became visibly shocked and surprised. It was decided by Attlee that Vernon wouldn't be investigated further, but decided to investigate Meredith further, who held a sensitive position at Smiths Instruments as an aircraft stabilisation specialist. MI5 officer Jim Skardon was sent to interrogate Meredith, who lived in Cheltenham. Meredith almost immediately confirmed the existence of Weiss's espionage work in their initial interview, and oddly remarked that Weiss was the most Christ-like person he had ever met. Vernon was never interrogated while he was a Labour MP.
