= Meredith effect =

Aerodynamic phenomenon

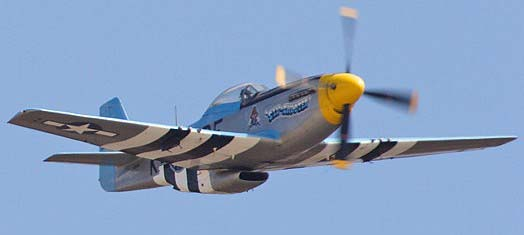
The North American P-51 Mustang makes significant use of the Meredith effect in its belly radiator design.

The Meredith effect is a phenomenon whereby the aerodynamic drag produced by a cooling radiator may be offset by careful design of the cooling duct such that useful thrust is produced by the expansion of the hot air in the duct. The effect was discovered in the 1930s and became more important as the speeds of piston-engined aircraft increased over the next decade.

== History ==
F. W. Meredith was a British engineer working at the Royal Aircraft Establishment (RAE), Farnborough. Reflecting on the principles of liquid cooling, he realized that what was conventionally regarded as waste heat, to be transferred to the atmosphere by a coolant in a radiator, need not be lost. The heat adds energy to the airflow and, with careful design, this may be used to generate thrust. The work was published in 1935.

The phenomenon became known as the "Meredith effect" and was quickly adopted by the designers of prototype fighter aircraft then under development, including the Me 109, Supermarine Spitfire and Hawker Hurricane whose Rolls-Royce PV-12 engine, later named the Merlin, was cooled by ethylene glycol. An early example of a Meredith effect radiator was incorporated in the design of the Spitfire for the first flight of the prototype on 5 March 1936.

Many engineers did not understand the operating principles of the effect. A common mistake was the idea that the air-cooled radial engine would benefit most, because its fins ran hotter than the radiator of a liquid-cooled engine, with the mistake persisting even as late as 1949.

A significant debate on the origin and effectiveness of the principle arose as a result of an article written by Lee Atwood in the 1990s. The article generated rebuttals in both the AAHS Journal and the Friends Journal of the Air Force Museum Foundation.

== Explanation ==
The Meredith effect occurs when air flowing through a duct is heated by a heat-exchanger or radiator containing a hot working fluid. Typically the fluid is a coolant carrying waste heat from an internal combustion engine.

P-51 radiator duct schematic diagram: 1 - air duct flap control system, 2 - air intake, 3 - oil radiator, 4 - oil radiator air exhaust, 5 - engine coolant radiator, 6 - air duct flaps, 7 - main air exhaust.

The duct must be travelling at a significant speed with respect to the air for the effect to occur. Air flowing into the duct meets drag resistance from the radiator surface and is compressed due to the ram air effect. As the air flows through the radiator it is heated, raising its temperature slightly and increasing its volume. The hot, pressurised air then exits through the exhaust duct which is shaped to be convergent, i.e. to narrow towards the rear. This accelerates the air backwards and the reaction of this acceleration against the installation provides a small forward thrust. The air expands and decreases temperature as it passes along the duct, before emerging to join the external air flow. Thus, the three processes of an open Brayton cycle are achieved: compression, heat addition at constant pressure, and expansion. The thrust obtainable depends upon the pressure ratio between the inside and outside of the duct and the temperature of the coolant. The higher boiling point of ethylene glycol compared to water allows the air to attain a higher temperature increasing the specific thrust.

If the generated thrust is less than the aerodynamic drag of the ducting and radiator, then the arrangement serves to reduce the net aerodynamic drag of the radiator installation. If the generated thrust exceeds the aerodynamic drag of the installation, then the entire assemblage contributes a net forward thrust to the vehicle.

The Meredith effect inspired the early American work on the aero-thermodynamic duct or ramjet, due to the similarity of their principles of operation. In more recent times the phenomenon has been utilised in racing cars by mounting the engine cooling radiators in tunnels.

== See also ==
- Brayton cycle
