= Frederick William Meredith =

Irish engineer

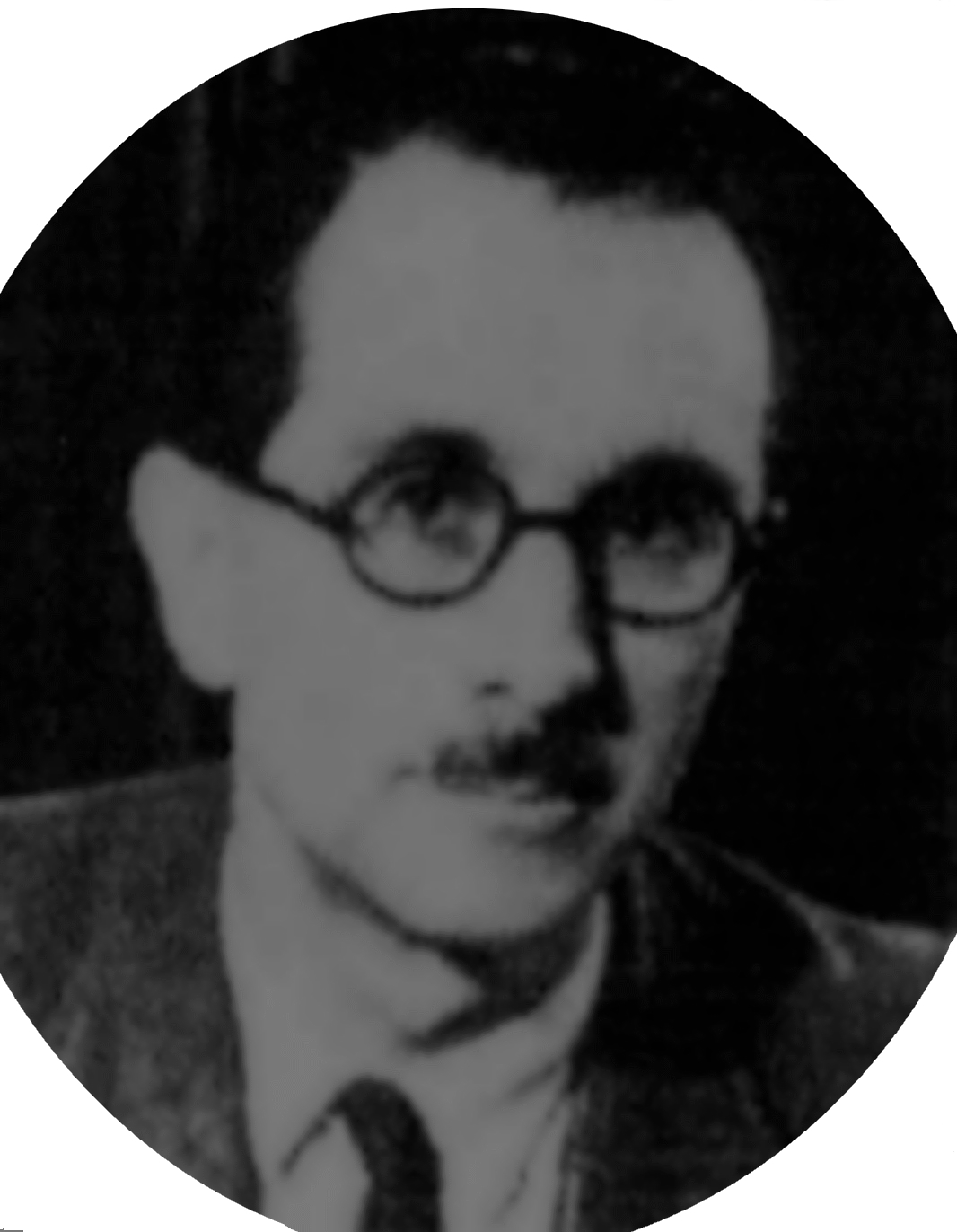
- FW Meredith
- Born: 10 July 1895; Killiney, Ireland
- Died: 1980
- Occupations: Engineer, Soviet intelligence officer
- Espionage activity
- Allegiance: GRU

Frederick William Meredith was an Irish engineer, communist and Soviet agent. From 1936 to 1939, Meredith, and his colleague at the Royal Aircraft Establishment (RAE), Wilfrid Vernon, spied for Ernest David Weiss, a Soviet GRU agent. In 1945, Meredith began the development of a new generation all-electric three-axis autopilot system called SEP-1 (Smiths Electric Pilot Mark 1) or the military version MARK 9.

== Life ==
Meredith was the son of Frederick Walsingham Meredith (1860-1924), a solicitor, and Georgina Ida Marion Bianca Meredith, née Ribton (1865-1935). He was one of four children, made up of 3 brothers and a sister. His brothers were the Chief Justice of the Patna High Court, Sir Herbert Ribton Meredith (1890-1959), Richard Walsingham Meredith (1892-1971), and Raymond Carew Meredith (1893-1970). His sister was Doris Guinevere Meredith (ca. 1900-1967).

As a child, Meredith attended a preparatory school, Aravon School in Bray, County Wicklow, between 1903 and 1909. Meredith won a mathematical scholarship that enabled him to attend Bromsgrove School between 1909 and 1912. He then attended university at Trinity College in Dublin between 1912 and 1914, when he won a foundation scholarship in mathematics. In 1919, Meredith was awarded a Bachelor of Arts.

In 1935, Meredith married Margaret Gwendolyn Meredith, née Barnard. The couple had two children, a boy and a girl.

== Research ==
Until April 1938, Meredith was a researcher at the RAE at Farnborough Airport. In 1935 following his studies in the wind tunnel, he published a report titled: "Note on the cooling of aircraft engines with special reference to ethylene glycol radiators enclosed in ducts" for the Report and Memoranda (R&M) of the Aeronautical Research Committee of the Air Ministry, in which he demonstrated the possibility of transforming the air flow towards the cooling system of endothermic engines on the radiator, thanks to its conveyance into a suitable duct on the heat exchanger, containing a mixture of water and ethylene glycol as engine coolant, at certain speeds, into additional thrust. This study experimented on the Supermarine Spitfire and subsequently carried out with the Rolls-Royce Merlin engine on the North American P-51D Mustang aircraft, which became known for the use of the Meredith Effect and used under the erroneous name of Frank W. Meredith from the NASA Meredith Cycle as the principle for the study that created what is now the ramjet.

In 1938, Meredith left the RAE laboratories to take up an appointment at Smiths Aircraft Instrument company in Cricklewood Works in Cricklewood, London as head of the Physics and Instruments department with the title of Chief Designer. Meredith was able to continue developing his studies for several patents in the field of aircraft instrumentation. He is credited as the co-inventor of the automatic pilot for the DH.82 Queen Bee pilotless drone.

== Espionage ==
Meredith held extreme left-wing views, supported Labour and was a communist and a Marxist. In 1926, when as a left-wing agitator during the general strike of 1926, he stated that if he was called upon to perform duties other than those for which he was appointed, then he would commit sabotage. His conduct was investigated by the Air Ministry but no action was taken. In December 1927, Meredith was reported to Special Branch (SB) for holding extreme views on Sinn Féin and being a communist. In 1932, Meredith applied to visit the Soviet Union and the Air Ministry felt that although his work was secret, it was considered unlikely that he would expose important information. On 21 May 1932, Meredith along with eight other colleagues visited the Soviet Union, returning in June 1932. In 1934, the Chief Constable of Hampshire reported to SB that Meredith had attended the hunger marches as they marched to Aldershot. Further enquires conducted by Special Branch found that Meredith read the Daily Worker, a communist newspaper in the 1930s. On 10 August 1935 Meredith visited the Soviet Union along with Ronald McKinnon Wood.

In 1935, Meredith attended a meeting of the Union of Democratic Control where he met the journalist Dorothy Woodman who introduced him to "Harry II", an unidentified Paris based Red Army agent and was recruited to work with Russian intelligence. Meredith met with him several times, before "Harry II" introduced him to Vernon and Weiss. The last contact between "Harry II" and Meredith was in 1937, when he and his wife attended the Moscow May Day Parade in 1937 and was entertained at the Russians expense. Meredith began supplying intelligence according to his agreed contract with Weiss. Over the next three years between 1936 and 1939, he forwarded information of the development of the remote controlled, pilotless DH.82 Queen Bee target drone, details of an automatic bomb sight and information on aircraft stabilisation were passed to Weiss.

On 30 January 1948, Meredith was discovered to be informant to Ernest David Weiss, a Soviet agent who worked for the Communist International (Comintern) when he was interviewed by MI5 after his name was found in the Robinson papers and immediately put under surveillance. On 6 January 1949, Meredith was interviewed by Jim Skardon of MI5 and during the interview had implicated Vernon, which enabled Skardon to fully prepare for the interview with Vernon. Meredith also implicated Vernon's lawyer, Denis Pritt, at the time a well known communist sympathiser. Pritt had defended Vernon in a trial in May 1932, after Vernon had been arrested for holding classified documents. Pritt espoused an entirely innocent explanation of why Vernon was holding these classified documents, essentially lying, contrary to the actual facts. By using that defence, Pritt has taken an ethical stance that was odds with his profession, to save Vernon from prison. MI5 took this as proof that Pritt was a Soviet agent.

Meredith was kept under surveillance by MI5, but he wasn't dismissed due to his outstanding technical ability. At a meeting on 6 April 1951, held by Roger Hollis along with Archibald Rowlands, Alec Coryton and the chairman of Smiths, at the Ministry of Supply, it was decided to take a calculated risk and continue to employ Meredith but at the same time to ensure that Meredith couldn't access any classified information, particularly American information. The decision was submitted to George Strauss Minister of Supply on 16 April 1951, who agreed with it, confirming its validity.
