= Robinson papers =

Gestapo counterintelligence document archive

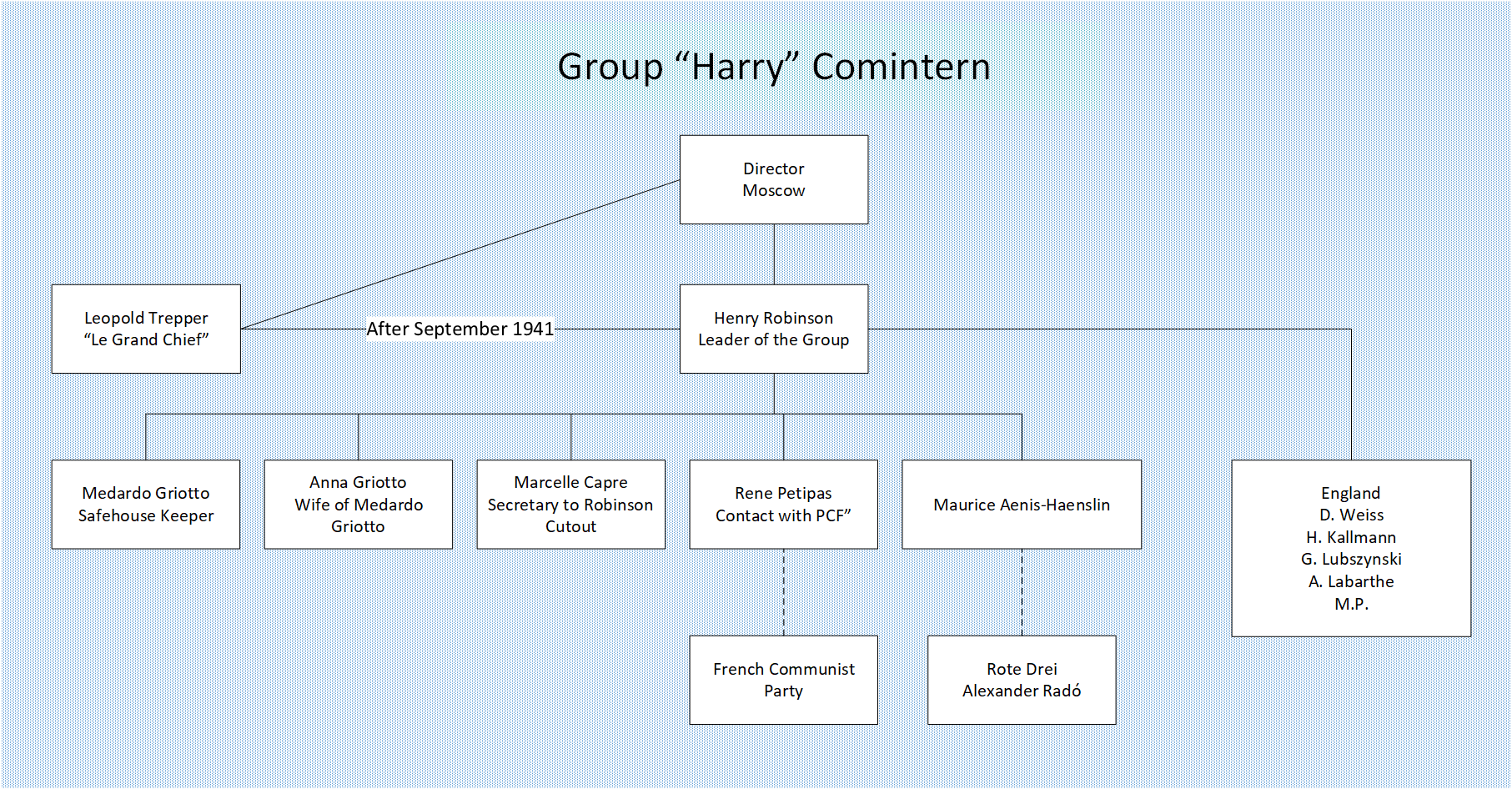
The Robinson espionage network hierarchy diagram in Belgium and the United Kingdom

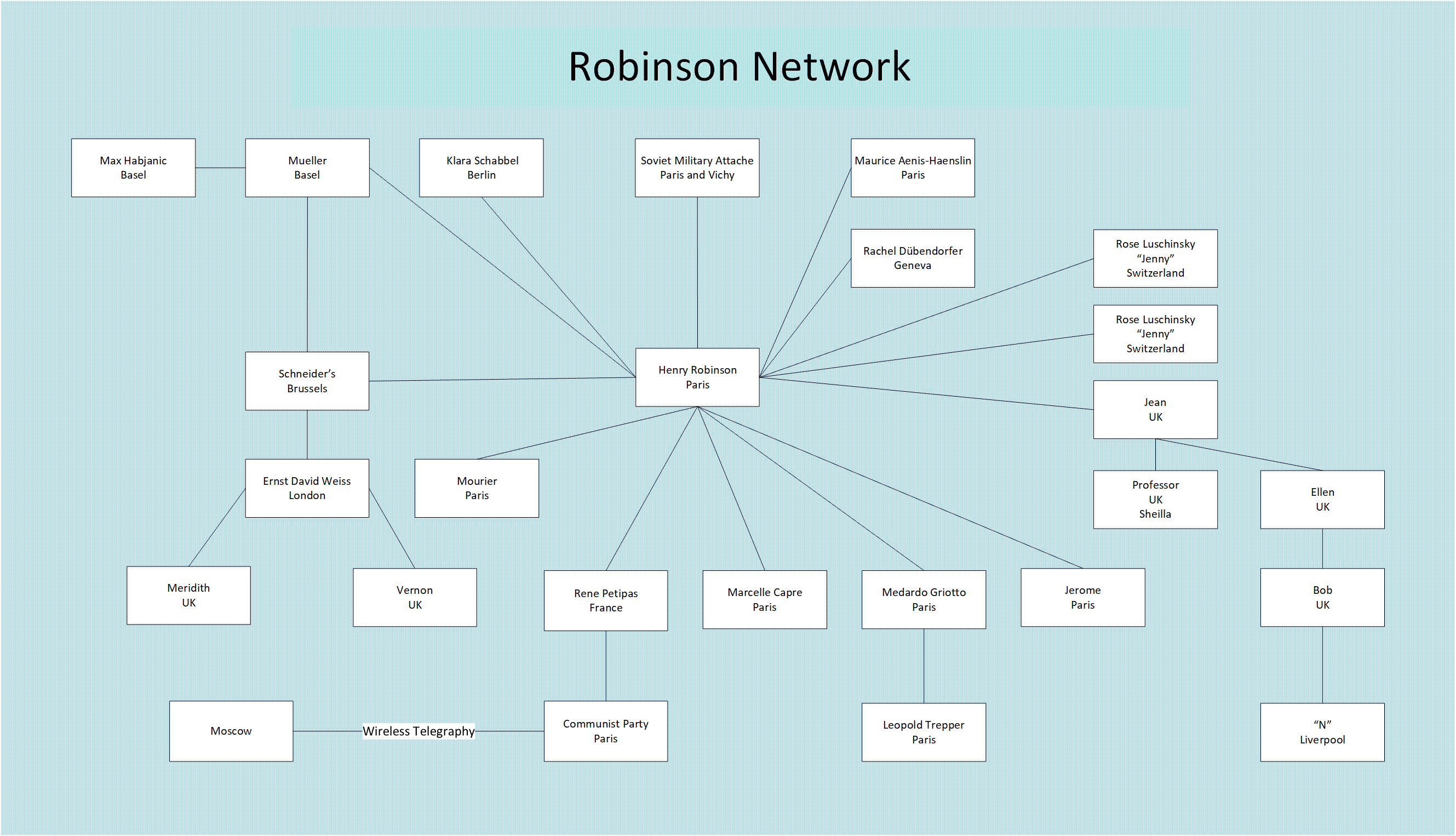
The Robinson espionage network hierarchy diagram in France

The Robinson papers were a document archive initially consisting of some 800 documents that included detailed intelligence sources, identity documents, agents aliases, maps, cipher coding data, notebooks and reports that were created and kept by Communist International (Comintern) agent Henry Robinson before and during World War II. The archive was discovered under the floorboards of a Paris hotel room by the Gestapo in December 1942 when Robinson was arrested and later sent to British military intelligence at the end of the war, where it was wrongly classified during storage and rediscovered in 1947. At that point it was analysed and through that analysis and the arrest of several Soviet agents working in the United Kingdom, a picture of several Soviet espionage organisations operating across Europe began to emerge, that was known as the Red Orchestra ("Rote Kapelle") by the Germans and had been investigated by the German Sonderkommando Rote Kapelle during World War II.

== Background ==
Henry Robinson was a German Jew, born in Brussels who as a young man had radicalised and turned to communism. In 1920, working with Willi Münzenberg and the Swiss Communist Jules Humbert-Droz he had established the Young Communist League of Germany (KJVD). In 1921, he was requested to visit the Soviet Union, where he was trained as an espionage agent in the Communist International (Comintern). In 1924, he began his espionage career as director of the AM-Apparat of the KPD for Central and Eastern Europe In 1933, Robinson was recruited into Soviet Red Army intelligence where he worked with Soviet espionage networks in France, Britain and Switzerland.

== Discovery ==
On 20 December 1942 Robinson was arrested in Paris by agents of the Sonderkommando Rote Kapelle. A hotel room that was used by Robinson was searched by the Gestapo. The floorboard in the hotel were removed and large briefcase containing the archive was discovered. These document originals were sent to the RSHA and subsequently seized by Soviet forces during the advance. These were known to be held in Potsdam after World War II. However before that event, photostats were made of the archive and these were sent by Abwehr IIIF in France to Abwehrstelle Belgium in Brussels. In September 1944, the former Gestapo headquarters at 453 Avenue Louise in Brussels was occupied. It was searched and found to contain the archive of the Sonderkommando Rote Kapelle in Belgium and covered investigations by the unit in Germany, France, Belgium and the Netherlands Within the Sonderkommando archive was the Robinson Papers. These came into the custody of British intelligence after the Liberation of Belgium.

== Analysis ==
Once the archive was received, it was sent to the counterintelligence war room of the combined Special Operations Executive-Office of Strategic Services military intelligence service in London. The archive was mislabelled when it was going into storage and effectively lost until it was rediscovered in 1947. A proper study of the archive was begun by MI5 officers Michael Serpell and Robert Hemblys-Scales. Within the several hundred documents were many names, only identified by their codename. The most important name and the common thread running through the archive was Henri Baumann, an alias of Henry Robinson. It was discovered that Robinson under the alias Henri Baumann, had run various espionage networks in the UK in the 1930's and 1940's.

Almost immediately the analysis discovered and identified three names, the transport economist Ernest David Weiss, Labour Party politician and Member of Parliament Wilfrid Vernon along with Frederick William Meredith, a Dublin engineer who were placed under surveillance. Weiss was eventually interrogated and confessed to being a key Soviet agent and exposed a number of other Soviet agents operating in the UK. The papers also disclosed a number of code-names including JEAN, ELLEN, PROFESSOR and his wife SHIELA. JEAN was Robinsons chief agent who worked in London. According to the papers, JEAN forwarded intelligence to Robinson by mail and courier who then passed it to an agent LUX who delivered it to the Soviet embassy in Vichy. In June 1941, when Hitler invaded the Soviet Union and the Soviet embassy in Vichy closed, JEAN began to communicate by radio with Robinson. This puzzled MI5 as no radio signals to the continent had been detected in Britain during the war. Further evidence emerged in June 1941 from a cable from the Venona project that was partially decrypted that suggested that JEAN's codename had been chosen by a Russian and was likely active in London in June 1941, which was contrary to the statement that Weiss made. This suggested that Weiss was actually JEAN although MI5 seemed to believe his statement and allowed him to remain in the UK.

Further evidence of an active Soviet espionage network in the UK emerged in August 1947, when the Soviet agent and radioman Alexander Foote was interrogated by MI5 officer Courtney Young. Foote admitted that he been recruited in 1938 while attending the Communist Party of Britain (CPGB) Congress in Birmingham by International Brigadist, Fred Copeman who was acting as a proxy for Dave Springhall, the British communist. Foote considered Springhall the main recruiter for Soviet intelligence in the CPGB. Foote who was a core member of the Soviet espionage group, Red Three ("Rote Drei) in Switzerland during World War II being the groups radioman. He was subsequently ordered to London where he was trained by Soviet agent Ursula Kuczynski. Foote's exposed the whole Rote Drei organisation in Switzerland which convinced MI5 to begin following his leads. The first people they arrested were Ursula Kuczynski and her husband, the cipher clerk Len Beurton who were interrogated by MI5 in September 1947. Both denied having worked for Soviet intelligence.

At the time that Vernon was named, he was the Labour MP for Dulwich, a seat he lost in 1951. Parliamentary privilege ensured he wasn't interrogated until he lost his seat. In February 1952, Vernon was interrogated by MI5 officer Jim Skardon and admitted having been part of a pre-war Soviet espionage ring and confirmed the statement that Weiss made. By that point Vernon's career as a politician was at an end.

== Rote Kapelle ==
Gradually MI5 began to build evidence of the existence of a much larger Soviet espionage organisation or several large organisations operating in Europe through analysis of the Robinson papers, other captured documentation and Foote's interrogation in what was described by the Germans as the "Rote Kapelle". The German Sonderkommando Rote Kapelle had comprehensively investigated the Rote Kapelle and arrested many people associated with the network, in several different European countries. Amongst the Soviet agents that the Sonderkommando had investigated with the Soviet agent Leopold Trepper. MI5 was able discover that Trepper visited England in 1937 and in 1938, but was unable to discover the reason for the visit. MI5 concluded that he was managing another network that hadn't been discovered. Another Rote Kapelle spy that MI5 investigated was Alexander Radó. Rado had visited London between 7–10 November in 1937 but again, the reason for the visit remained unknown.

Foote remained MI5's main informer on the Swiss Rote Drei until he died in April 1951. The last Soviet agent that Foote exposed was International Labour Organization employee Rachel Dübendorfer, who ran an espionage network in Switzerland that was part of the Rote Drei.
