= Jim Skardon =

William James Skardon (15 March 1904 - 9 March 1987) was an English police officer and intelligence officer.

== Life ==
Born in Woolwich to a police constable, he also joined the Metropolitan Police himself. He was assigned to Special Branch before moving to MI5 in 1940 and became an interrogator and head of "The Watchers" (physical surveillance teams). He was intimately involved with the investigation of the Cambridge Five and the interrogation of Klaus Fuchs.

After rapidly and non-coercively eliciting a confession from Fuchs, Skardon acquired a reputation as a very skilful interrogator. However his own report of the Fuchs interrogation indicates that Fuchs – apparently in a condition of considerable mental stress – volunteered his entire confession with very little prompting. Peter Wright also claimed that the success of that interrogation depended mainly on the detailed brief supplied to Skardon, plus the "listeners" who picked Fuchs's lies to pieces. Skardon's subsequent record in interrogations was considerably less successful, and his success with Fuchs led to these negative results being given too much credence. Some of Skardon's subsequent failures include:

- Kim Philby – interrogated ten times without result (although Skardon was apparently never given a free hand).
- Anthony Blunt – interviewed and cleared 11 times between 1951 and 1964. Finally confessed in 1964 when confronted with incontrovertible evidence.
- John Cairncross – interviewed and cleared in 1952, despite strong circumstantial evidence being found in Burgess' flat. Left the country very soon after the interrogation but returned in 1967 and confessed when confronted with Blunt's confession.
- Jim Hill – liaison officer in the Australian Ministry of Foreign Affairs, access was restricted to classified information in 1949 on the basis of Venona project material, interrogated three times by Skardon in 1959, cleared and access restored. Almost certainly an NKVD agent.

He died in Torquay.

== See also ==
- James Jesus Angleton
