= Huntingdonshire District Council elections =

Local government elections in Cambridgeshire, England

Huntingdonshire District Council in Cambridgeshire, England holds elections for all its councillors together every fourth year. Prior to changing to all-out elections in 2018, one third of the council was elected each year, followed by one year without an election. Since the last boundary changes in 2018, 52 councillors have been elected from 26 wards.

== Council elections ==
Summary of the council composition after recent council elections, click on the year for full details of each election. Boundary changes took place for the 2004 election reducing the number of seats by 1, leading to the whole council being elected in that year.

Composition of the council
Year	Conservative	Labour	Liberal Democrats (Note: Includes totals for the predecessors of the Liberal Democrats, the Liberal Party and SDP (both of which participated in the Alliance).)	UKIP	Green (Note: Includes totals for the predecessors of the Green Party of England and Wales, the Ecology Party and Green Party UK.)	Reform UK	Independents & Others	Council control after election
Local government reorganisation; council established (50 seats)
1973	16	9	0	–	–	–	25	No overall control
New ward boundaries (53 seats)
1976	30	1	0	–	0	–	22	Conservative
1978	28	2	1	–	0	–	23	Conservative
1979	35	2	1	–	0	–	15	Conservative
1980	33	6	1	–	0	–	13	Conservative
1982	32	7	2	–	0	–	12	Conservative
1983	37	8	2	–	0	–	6	Conservative
1984	36	7	3	–	0	–	7	Conservative
1986	41	6	2	–	0	–	4	Conservative
1987	44	5	1	–	0	–	3	Conservative
1988	46	4	1	–	0	–	2	Conservative
1990	41	6	3	–	0	–	3	Conservative
1991	41	5	5	–	0	–	2	Conservative
1992	42	3	7	–	0	–	1	Conservative
1994	36	4	12	0	0	–	1	Conservative
1995	31	7	14	0	0	–	1	Conservative
1996	33	5	13	0	0	–	2	Conservative
1998	34	3	14	0	0	–	2	Conservative
1999	36	0	14	0	0	–	2	Conservative
2000	37	0	13	0	0	–	3	Conservative
2002	36	0	14	0	0	–	3	Conservative
2003	36	0	14	0	0	–	3	Conservative
New ward boundaries (52 seats)
2004	40	0	10	0	0	–	2	Conservative
2006	39	0	11	0	0	–	2	Conservative
2007	39	0	11	0	0	–	2	Conservative
2008	38	0	12	0	0	–	2	Conservative
2010	37	0	12	2	0	–	1	Conservative
2011	41	0	8	2	0	–	1	Conservative
2012	39	1	7	3	0	–	2	Conservative
2014	35	1	5	7	0	–	4	Conservative
2015	36	2	4	6	0	–	4	Conservative
2016	34	2	6	6	0	–	4	Conservative
New ward boundaries (52 seats)
2018	30	4	7	0	0	–	11	Conservative
2022	22	4	10	0	1	0	15	No overall control
2026	15	1	20	–	2	10	4	No overall control

== District result maps ==
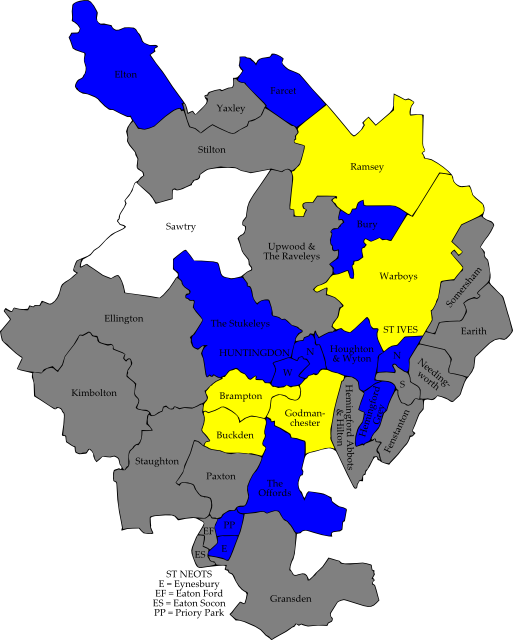
2002 results map

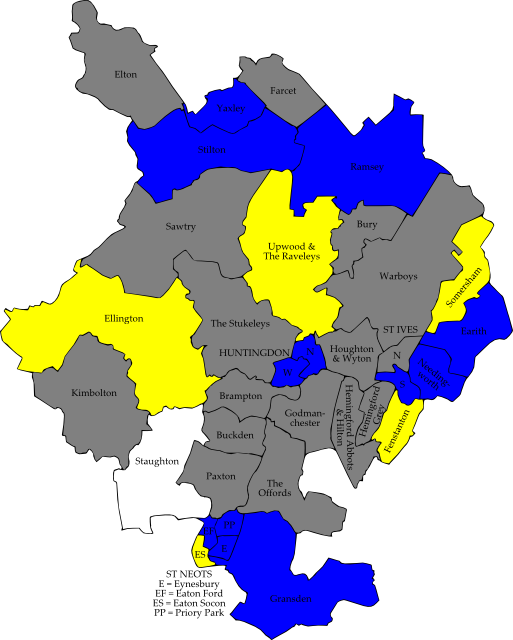
2003 results map

2004 results map

2006 results map

2007 results map

2008 results map

2010 results map

2011 results map

2012 results map

2014 results map

2015 results map

2016 results map

2018 results map

2022 results map

2026 results map

== By-election results ==
By-elections occur when seats become vacant between council elections. Below is a summary of recent by-elections; full by-election results can be found by clicking on the by-election name.

By-election	Date	Incumbent party	Winning party
Farcet	21 August 1997	Conservative	Conservative
Brampton	6 November 1997	Conservative	Liberal Democrats
Eynesbury	2 April 1998	Liberal Democrats	Conservative
Gransden	10 December 1998	Conservative	Conservative
Huntingdon North	3 June 1999	Conservative	Conservative
Upwood and the Raveleys	8 March 2001	Conservative	Conservative
Eynesbury	7 June 2001	Conservative	Conservative
Farcet	7 June 2001	Conservative	Conservative
Gransden	7 June 2001	Conservative	Conservative
Eaton Socon	21 March 2002	Liberal Democrats	Liberal Democrats
Hemingford Grey	19 September 2002	Conservative	Liberal Democrats
Little Paxton	5 May 2005	Conservative	Conservative
Earith	12 October 2006	Conservative	Conservative
St Neots Eaton	23 November 2006	Conservative	Conservative
Warboys and Bury	15 February 2007	Liberal Democrats	Liberal Democrats
Ramsey	2 April 2009	Conservative	Conservative
Ramsey	23 July 2009	Liberal Democrats	UKIP
Huntingdon North	29 October 2009	Liberal Democrats	Liberal Democrats
Fenstanton	25 February 2010	Conservative	Liberal Democrats
Earith	21 June 2012	Conservative	Conservative
Brampton	2 May 2013	Liberal Democrats	Liberal Democrats
Warboys and Bury	7 August 2014	Conservative	Conservative
St Neots Priory Park	27 November 2014	Conservative	Conservative
Huntingdon East	10 December 2015	UKIP	Liberal Democrats
St Neots Eaton Ford	4 May 2017	Conservative	The St Neots Independent Group
Godmanchester & Hemingford Abbots	2 August 2019	Liberal Democrats	Liberal Democrats
Alconbury	12 December 2019	Liberal Democrats	Liberal Democrats
St Ives East	13 February 2020	Conservative	Conservative
Huntingdon North	6 May 2021	Labour	Labour
St Ives East	6 May 2021	Conservative	Conservative
St Ives South	6 May 2021	Conservative	Conservative
Warboys	6 May 2021	Conservative	Conservative
St Neots East	8 July 2021	Labour	Independent
Huntingdon East	4 November 2021	Liberal Democrats	Liberal Democrats
Great Paxton	2 May 2024	Conservative	Liberal Democrats
St Neots Eatons	19 September 2024	Conservative	Independent
St Neots Eynesbury	19 September 2024	Reform	Liberal Democrats
