= 2026 Huntingdonshire District Council election =

Local election in England

- 7 May 2026

All 52 seats to Huntingdonshire District Council 27 seats needed for a majority
- Registered: 140,117
- Turnout: 58,266; 41.6%
	First party	Second party	Third party
Leader	Sarah Conboy	Ross Martin	Ryan Coogan
Party	Liberal Democrats	Conservative	Reform
Last election	10 seats, 20.2%	22 seats, 43.5%	0 seats, 0.2%
Seats before	16	18	0
Seats won	20	15	10
Seat change	▲4	▼3	▲10
Popular vote	32,120	30,812	33,032
Percentage	26.4%	25.4%	27.2%
Swing	▲6.2%	▼18.1%	▲27.0%
	Fourth party	Fifth party	Sixth party
Leader	(Note: Tom Sanderson was leader of the HDC Independent group and Ben Pitt was the leader of the Cambs Independent group.)	Lara Davenport-Ray	Sam Wakeford (defeated)
Party	Independent	Green	Labour
Last election	11 seats, 20.0%	1 seat, 4.1%	4 seats, 12.1%
Seats before	13 (Note: Of the 13 Independent councillors sitting before the election, 8 sat in the HDC Independent group, 4 sat in the Cambs Independent group, and 1 was non-aligned.)	2	3
Seats won	4	2	1
Seat change	▼9	Steady	▼2
Popular vote	8,216	10,386	6,731
Percentage	6.8%	8.5%	5.5%
Swing	▼6.2%	▲4.4%	▼6.6%
- Winner of each seat at the 2026 Huntingdon District Council election.
Leader before election
Sarah Conboy
Liberal Democrat
No overall control (Note: Liberal Democrat–Independent–Labour–Green coalition.)
Leader after election
Sarah Conboy
Liberal Democrat
No overall control (Note: Liberal Democrat-Green-Independent coalition.)

The 2026 Huntingdonshire District Council election was held on 7 May 2026, alongside the other local elections across the United Kingdom being held on the same day, to elect all 52 members of Huntingdonshire District Council in England.

Prior to the election, the council was under no overall control, being run by a coalition of the Liberal Democrats, Labour, Greens and some of the independent councillors, led by Liberal Democrat councillor Sarah Conboy. After the election, the council remained under no overall control, and the Liberal Democrats overtook the Conservatives to become the largest party on the council. Another coalition was formed after the election, again led by Sarah Conboy, this time comprising the Liberal Democrats, Greens and independent councillors.

Due to ongoing local government reorganisation, this will be the final election to Huntingdonshire District Council before it is abolished and replaced by a successor unitary authority. Elections to the successor authority are due to take place in 2027.

== Background ==
In 2022, the Conservative Party lost the council to no overall control. The Conservatives remained the largest party after the 2022 election, but the council was run by a coalition of the Liberal Democrats, Labour, Greens and independent councillors.

== Council composition ==
After 2022 election		Before 2026 election	
Party	Seats	Party	Seats
Conservative	22	Conservative	18
Liberal Democrats	10	Liberal Democrats	16
Labour	4	Labour	3
Green	1	Green	2
Independent	11	Independent	13
The St Neots Independent Group	4	The St Neots Independent Group	Dissolved

Changes 2022–2026:

- January 2023: Doug Dew (Conservative) joins Liberal Democrats
- March 2024: Richard West (Conservative) resigns – by-election held May 2024
- May 2024:
  - James Catmur (Liberal Democrats) gains by-election from Conservatives
  - Martin Hassall (Liberal Democrats) leaves party to sit as an independent
- June 2024: Graham Welton (Conservative) dies – by-election held September 2024
- September 2024: Barry Chapman (Independent) gains by-election from Conservatives
- September 2025: Roger Brereton (Conservative) leaves party to sit as an independent
- November 2025: St Neots Independent Group dissolved – Barry Banks, Ian Taylor, Simone Taylor, and Doug Terry sit as independents
- January 2026:
  - Michael Burke (Independent), Cath Gleadow (Labour), and Sally Howell (Independent) join Liberal Democrats
  - Stephen Ferguson (Independent) joins Greens
- February 2026:
  - Ann Blackwell (Independent) and Tom Sanderson (Independent) join Liberal Democrats

== Election result ==
2026 Huntingdonshire District Council election
Party	Candidates	Seats	Gains	Losses	Net gain/loss	Seats %	Votes %	Votes	+/−
Liberal Democrats	52	20	7	3	▲4	38.5	26.4	32,120	+6.2
Conservative	52	15	2	5	▼3	28.8	25.4	30,812	–18.1
Reform	52	10	10	0	▲10	19.2	27.2	33,032	+27.0
Independent	13	4	0	9	▼9	7.7	6.8	8,216	–6.2
Green	33	2	1	1	Steady	3.8	8.5	10,386	+4.4
Labour	27	1	1	3	▼2	1.9	5.5	6,731	–6.6
Animal Welfare	1	0	0	0	Steady	0.0	0.1	96	N/A
Party of Women	1	0	0	0	Steady	0.0	0.1	94	N/A

== Ward results ==
=== Alconbury ===
Alconbury
Party	Candidate	Votes	%	±%
Conservative	Ian Gardener*	641	46.1	−16.9
Reform	Roger Lane	380	27.3	N/A
Green	Chip Colquhoun	184	13.2	−23.8
Liberal Democrats	Sarah Caine	130	9.4	N/A
Labour	Joy Isaacs	55	4.0	N/A
Majority		261	18.8	–7.2
Rejected ballots		4		
Turnout		1,394	48.1	+10.6
Registered electors		2,897		
Conservative hold				

=== Brampton ===
Brampton (2 seats)
Party	Candidate	Votes	%	±%
Liberal Democrats	Liam Dewey-Beckett	1,160	45.7	−27.1
Liberal Democrats	Warren Smith	989	39.0	−26.3
Conservative	Bill Sinclair	646	25.5	−2.8
Reform	Malcom Ryman	559	22.0	N/A
Reform	Leslie Parren	552	21.8	N/A
Conservative	Philip Makwana	524	20.7	−1.6
Green	Hannah Copley	356	14.0	N/A
Labour	Damilola Ademiniyi	176	6.9	N/A
Labour	Fardous Siddique	113	4.5	N/A
Rejected ballots		6		
Turnout		2,690	40.5	+5.6
Registered electors		6,645		
Liberal Democrats hold				
Liberal Democrats hold				

=== Buckden ===
Buckden
Party	Candidate	Votes	%	±%
Independent	Martin Hassall*	514	38.7	−24.6
Reform	Ian Simmonds	296	22.3	N/A
Conservative	Catherine Grigg	245	18.5	−18.2
Liberal Democrats	Sean Calvin	161	12.1	−51.2
Green	Christopher Burlow	75	5.7	N/A
Labour	James Kerr	36	2.7	N/A
Majority		218	16.4	N/A
Rejected ballots		2		
Turnout		1,329	46.2	+7.0
Registered electors		2,876		
Independent hold				

Note: Hassall had been elected as a Liberal Democrat in 2022 before becoming an independent in 2024

=== Fenstanton ===
Fenstanton
Party	Candidate	Votes	%	±%
Liberal Democrats	Nick Sarkies	542	38.3	−12.1
Conservative	Martin Hewitt	462	32.6	−4.6
Reform	Hayley Howatt	291	20.6	N/A
Green	Danny Scott	121	8.5	N/A
Majority		78	5.5	–7.7
Rejected ballots		1		
Turnout		1,419	44.8	+7.4
Registered electors		3,170		
Liberal Democrats hold		Swing	▼3.8	

=== Godmanchester & Hemingford Abbots ===
Godmanchester & Hemingford Abbots (3 seats)
Party	Candidate	Votes	%	±%
Liberal Democrats	Sarah Conboy*	1,720	53.0	−14.2
Liberal Democrats	Debbie Mickelburgh*	1,507	46.4	−10.8
Liberal Democrats	Brett Mickelburgh*	1,405	43.3	−12.1
Reform	Ronald Spencer	936	28.8	+21.3
Reform	Mark Turley	742	22.9	N/A
Reform	Kieron Marriner	724	22.3	N/A
Conservative	Paula Sparling	671	20.7	−9.2
Conservative	Kevin Barr	630	19.4	−9.1
Conservative	Rosemary Armstrong	541	16.7	−11.2
Green	Francis Reid	407	12.5	N/A
Labour	Daniel Mayhew	237	7.3	N/A
Labour	Ambrose Ntuk	221	6.8	N/A
Rejected ballots		6		
Turnout		3,499	43.4	+6.0
Registered electors		8,063		
Liberal Democrats hold				
Liberal Democrats hold				
Liberal Democrats hold				

=== Great Paxton ===
Great Paxton
Party	Candidate	Votes	%	±%
Liberal Democrats	Stephen Claffey	657	48.2	+8.4
Conservative	Amanda Lower	433	31.8	−17.6
Reform	Malcolm Gaylor	205	15.0	N/A
Green	Hollie Topliffe	68	5.0	N/A
Majority		224	16.4	N/A
Rejected ballots		3		
Turnout		1,366	51.8	+9.5
Registered electors		2,636		
Liberal Democrats hold		Swing	▲13.0	

=== Great Staughton ===
Great Staughton
Party	Candidate	Votes	%	±%
Conservative	Stephen Cawley*	566	43.1	−15.1
Reform	Ann Fryer	357	27.2	N/A
Liberal Democrats	Tony Hulme	198	15.1	N/A
Green	Paul Westerman	121	9.2	−12.3
Labour	Yavin Owens	71	5.4	−15.0
Majority		209	15.9	–20.8
Rejected ballots		4		
Turnout		1,317	50.2	
Registered electors		2,623		
Conservative hold				

=== Hemingford Grey & Houghton ===
Hemingford Grey & Houghton (2 seats)
Party	Candidate	Votes	%	±%
Conservative	David Keane*	852	41.0	−6.4
Conservative	Paul Simpson	658	31.7	−8.2
Liberal Democrats	David Priestman	636	30.6	−3.4
Liberal Democrats	Anne Meredith	590	28.4	−4.2
Reform	Graham Bundy	432	20.8	N/A
Reform	Adrian Hyde	405	19.5	N/A
Green	Tamara Page	315	15.2	±0.0
Labour	Kevin Bryant	169	8.1	−5.1
Animal Welfare	Jacqui Cook	96	4.3	N/A
Rejected ballots		3		
Turnout		2,230	45.4	+8.1
Registered electors		4,914		
Conservative hold				
Conservative gain from Liberal Democrats				

=== Holywell-cum-Needingworth ===
Holywell-cum-Needingworth (2 seats)
Party	Candidate	Votes	%	±%
Conservative	Jon Neish*	889	37.5	N/A
Conservative	Paul Hodgson-Jones*	861	36.4	N/A
Liberal Democrats	Robin Carter	677	28.6	N/A
Reform	John Bleazard	606	25.6	N/A
Reform	Bob Marsh	583	24.6	N/A
Liberal Democrats	Laura Blows	486	20.5	N/A
Green	Phoebe Watts	358	15.1	N/A
Labour	Matthew Wetherfield	276	11.7	N/A
Rejected ballots		3		
Turnout		2,615	45.9	+8.6
Registered electors		5,695		
Conservative hold				
Conservative hold				

=== Huntingdon East ===
Huntingdon East (2 seats)
Party	Candidate	Votes	%	±%
Liberal Democrats	Jo Harvey*	875	42.9	–10.0
Liberal Democrats	Nathan Hunt*	811	39.8	–13.1
Reform	David Howard	549	26.9	N/A
Reform	Sergiu Ardelean	511	25.0	N/A
Conservative	Frederick Joyce	455	22.3	–18.9
Conservative	Tomin Geo	432	21.2	–19.2
Green	Seona Gunn-Kelly	204	10.0	N/A
Labour	Zara Dolan-Ansary	144	7.1	N/A
Labour	Rashid Mahmood	99	4.9	N/A
Rejected ballots		6		
Turnout		2,151	41.6	+5.4
Registered electors		5,171		
Liberal Democrats hold				
Liberal Democrats hold				

=== Huntingdon North ===
Huntingdon North (3 seats)
Party	Candidate	Votes	%	±%
Reform	David Henly	627	29.1	N/A
Reform	Steven Lancaster	595	27.6	N/A
Reform	Mike Simpson	592	27.5	N/A
Labour	Patrick Kadewere*	574	26.6	–25.9
Labour	Marion Kadewere*	545	25.3	–24.2
Conservative	Sophie Feary	487	22.6	–19.3
Labour	Sam Wakeford*	474	22.0	–24.3
Conservative	Leedo George	471	21.8	–19.9
Green	Georgie Hunt	414	19.2	N/A
Green	Ryan Grange	383	17.8	N/A
Conservative	Keith Prentice	317	14.7	–22.0
Liberal Democrats	Mike Humphrey	283	13.1	N/A
Liberal Democrats	Michael Grice	270	12.5	N/A
Independent	Lianne Simpson	239	11.1	N/A
Liberal Democrats	Phillip Jones	197	9.1	N/A
Rejected ballots		20		
Turnout		2,355	27.9	+3.0
Registered electors		8,440		
Reform gain from Labour				
Reform gain from Labour				
Reform gain from Labour				

=== Kimbolton ===
Kimbolton
Party	Candidate	Votes	%	±%
Conservative	Jonathan Gray*	912	61.3	−9.8
Reform	David Blake	298	20.0	N/A
Liberal Democrats	James Catmur*	120	8.1	N/A
Green	Julie Stark	90	6.1	−6.3
Labour	Kelly Ramsbottom	67	4.5	−12.1
Majority		614	41.3	–13.2
Rejected ballots		4		
Turnout		1,491	52.6	+7.1
Registered electors		2,833		
Conservative hold				

=== Ramsey ===
Ramsey (3 seats)
Party	Candidate	Votes	%	±%
Reform	Ryan Coogan	1,127	35.7	N/A
Reform	Howard Tobias	1,110	35.2	N/A
Reform	Karan Maheshwari	1,027	32.5	N/A
Independent	Steve Corney*	954	30.2	N/A
Independent	Val Fendley	864	27.4	N/A
Conservative	Adela Costello*	830	26.3	–36.7
Independent	Ash Austin	784	24.8	N/A
Conservative	Jeff Clarke*	747	23.7	–36.0
Green	Anna Pritchard	405	12.8	N/A
Conservative	Zak Martin	384	12.2	–41.0
Labour	Janet Boston	381	12.1	–17.9
Liberal Democrats	Gerard Crean	318	10.1	–20.5
Liberal Democrats	Clare Delderfield	283	9.0	N/A
Liberal Democrats	Graham Wilson	254	8.0	N/A
Rejected ballots		9		
Turnout		3,455	39.0	+10.1
Registered electors		8,854		
Reform gain from Conservative				
Reform gain from Independent				
Reform gain from Independent				

Shortly after the election it was reported that the Police were investigating an allegation of a false declaration on Mr Coogan's nomination papers.. Coogan was subsequently arrested and released pending further attendance at a local police station in December 2026.

=== Sawtry ===
Sawtry (2 seats)
Party	Candidate	Votes	%	±%
Conservative	Simon Bywater*	1,364	66.3	N/A
Conservative	Ross Martin*	1,088	52.9	N/A
Reform	Rick Rambridge	505	24.6	N/A
Reform	Haydn Stevens	453	22.0	N/A
Green	Ian Scales	237	11.5	N/A
Liberal Democrats	Sarah Wilson	206	10.0	N/A
Labour	Robin Simpson	182	8.9	N/A
Liberal Democrats	Kerry York	77	3.7	N/A
Rejected ballots		1		
Turnout		2,167	40.8	N/A
Registered electors		5,307		
Conservative hold				
Conservative hold				

=== Somersham ===
Somersham
Party	Candidate	Votes	%	±%
Conservative	Sarah Hodgson-Jones	408	33.7	−31.2
Reform	Edward Binns	359	29.6	N/A
Liberal Democrats	Keith Brown	220	18.2	N/A
Labour	Kevin Hawkins	121	10.0	−25.1
Green	Jamie Troup	103	8.5	N/A
Majority		49	4.1	–25.7
Rejected ballots		1		
Turnout		1,212	40.7	+11.2
Registered electors		2,979		
Conservative hold				

=== St. Ives East ===
St. Ives East (2 seats)
Party	Candidate	Votes	%	±%
Liberal Democrats	Michael Burke*	567	31.0	−22.4
Independent	Shariqa Mokbul*	516	28.2	–18.8
Reform	Noah Sanderson	506	27.7	N/A
Reform	Mandy Harrington	467	25.5	N/A
Conservative	Paul Bullen	390	21.3	–23.9
Green	Louise Newberry	354	19.4	N/A
Conservative	Martin Gill	347	19.0	–24.0
Liberal Democrats	Simon Jordan	259	14.2	N/A
Labour	Luke Viner	252	13.8	N/A
Rejected ballots		19		
Turnout		2,018	40.5	+8.4
Registered electors		4,978		
Liberal Democrats hold				
Independent hold				

Note: Burke had been elected as an independent in 2022 before joining the Liberal Democrats in 2024

=== St. Ives South ===
St. Ives South (2 seats)
Party	Candidate	Votes	%	±%
Labour	Alex Bulat	842	33.9	–12.6
Liberal Democrats	Nic Wells*	641	25.8	–29.3
Labour	William Deacon	635	25.6	N/A
Conservative	Craig Smith	586	23.6	–12.8
Liberal Democrats	Cath Gleadow*	522	21.0	N/A
Reform	Paul Dickinson	484	19.5	N/A
Conservative	Andrew Riddell	472	19.0	–15.6
Reform	Natasha Fatio	410	16.5	N/A
Green	Peter Brasher	374	15.1	N/A
Rejected ballots		10		
Turnout		2,657	44.5	+9.3
Registered electors		5,970		
Labour hold				
Liberal Democrats hold				

Incumbent Cath Gleadow had been elected as a Labour councillor but had left to join the Liberal Democrats.

=== St. Ives West ===
St. Ives West
Party	Candidate	Votes	%	±%
Independent	Julie Kerr*	552	53.7	+6.7
Reform	Max Mulcrone	211	20.5	N/A
Conservative	Cheryl Cannon	125	12.2	−31.9
Green	Rose Williams	77	7.5	−1.4
Liberal Democrats	Patricia Jordan	63	6.1	N/A
Majority		341	33.2	+30.3
Rejected ballots		1		
Turnout		1,029	44.8	+4.7
Registered electors		2,299		
Independent hold				

=== St Neots East ===
St Neots East (2 seats)
Party	Candidate	Votes	%	±%
Green	Lara Davenport-Ray*	951	65.0	–20.0
Green	Stephen Ferguson*	834	57.0	N/A
Reform	Alan Hilton	249	17.0	N/A
Reform	Rob Moores	235	16.1	N/A
Liberal Democrats	Sally Guinee	200	13.7	N/A
Liberal Democrats	Keith Harrison	163	11.1	N/A
Conservative	Gary Hyams	152	10.4	+4.6
Conservative	Angela Robertson	142	9.7	+4.3
Rejected ballots		14		
Turnout		1,565	39.7	+3.9
Registered electors		3,939		
Green hold				
Green gain from Independent				

Stephen Ferguson has been elected as an independent councillor for St Neots Priory Park and Little Paxton at the 2022 election,joined the Green Party earlier in 2026 and hence shown as gain.

=== St Neots Eatons ===
St Neots Eatons
Party	Candidate	Votes	%	±%
Liberal Democrats	Jacqueline Hunt	1,161	35.9	+12.3
Liberal Democrats	Alan Hunt	1,158	35.8	+17.0
Liberal Democrats	Geoff Seeff	1,140	35.3	+17.8
Reform	Colin Maslen	1,134	35.1	N/A
Reform	Stewart Thornton	1,077	33.3	N/A
Reform	David Smith	946	29.3	N/A
Conservative	Nigel Eaton	563	17.4	–13.4
Conservative	Andrew Jennings*	558	17.3	–13.3
Independent	Barry Banks*	514	15.9	N/A
Conservative	Harry Vallance	379	11.7	–17.0
Green	Barry Dajchin	288	8.9	–2.4
Green	Ellisa Westerman	284	8.8	+1.7
Green	Nicholas Sharp	246	7.6	+0.6
Labour	Michael Gilks	156	4.8	N/A
Party of Women	Bev White	94	2.9	N/A
Rejected ballots		5		
Turnout		3,467	41.5	+10.1
Registered electors		8,357		
Liberal Democrats gain from Independent				
Liberal Democrats gain from Conservative				
Liberal Democrats gain from Independent				

=== St. Neots Eynesbury ===
St. Neots Eynesbury (3 seats)
Party	Candidate	Votes	%	±%
Reform	Tony Nelson	978	34.6	N/A
Independent	Sam Smith	944	33.4	N/A
Reform	Ricky Ioannides	938	33.2	N/A
Reform	Pavlos Kasdovasilis	830	29.4	N/A
Independent	Ian Taylor*	698	24.7	N/A
Liberal Democrats	Deanna Seeff	653	23.1	N/A
Green	Catherine Goodman	649	23.0	N/A
Liberal Democrats	Camille Etchart	621	22.0	N/A
Liberal Democrats	Antoine McGowan	505	17.9	N/A
Independent	Doug Terry*	388	13.7	N/A
Conservative	Kenneth Billington	377	13.3	−18.9
Conservative	Julie Martin	348	12.3	−16.7
Independent	Ben Streeter-Strong	286	10.1	N/A
Conservative	Alexander Pushkarev	267	9.4	−18.5
Rejected ballots		30		
Turnout		3,122	35.0	+5.1
Registered electors		8,911		
Reform gain from Independent				
Independent hold				
Reform gain from Independent				

Less than two months after his election, Cllr Nelson resigned.

=== St Neots Priory Park & Little Paxton ===
St Neots Priory Park & Little Paxton (3 seats)
Party	Candidate	Votes	%	±%
Liberal Democrats	Carole Innes	1,193	36.8	N/A
Liberal Democrats	Mark Young	1,112	34.3	N/A
Conservative	Richard Tomlinson	1,044	32.2	−9.9
Liberal Democrats	Ganesh Sittampalam	1,025	31.6	N/A
Independent	Barry Chapman*	963	29.7	N/A
Reform	Tony Osborne	886	27.3	N/A
Reform	Steve O'Hara	732	22.6	N/A
Reform	Randall McDonald	594	18.3	N/A
Conservative	Harriet Dolby	542	16.7	−17.2
Conservative	Alfie Yorke	512	15.8	−17.9
Green	Christopher Ferguson	495	15.3	N/A
Green	Robert Bralee	328	10.1	N/A
Green	John Holmes	307	9.5	N/A
Rejected ballots		15		
Turnout		3,502	43.3	+8.3
Registered electors		8,087		
Liberal Democrats gain from Independent				
Liberal Democrats gain from Independent				
Conservative gain from Independent				

=== Stilton, Folksworth & Washingley ===
Stilton, Folksworth & Washingley (2 seats)
Party	Candidate	Votes	%	±%
Conservative	Tim Alban*	1,381	59.0	−11.1
Conservative	Marge Beuttell*	1,106	47.2	−11.3
Reform	Sharon Brennan	720	30.7	N/A
Reform	Eric Darling	654	27.9	N/A
Green	Stasi Revel	245	10.5	−6.8
Labour	Robert Bowden	207	8.8	−12.2
Liberal Democrats	Padrica Kennington	203	8.7	N/A
Liberal Democrats	Amanda Norton	168	7.2	N/A
Rejected ballots		3		
Turnout		2,510	48.2	+11.5
Registered electors		5,211		
Conservative hold				
Conservative hold				

=== The Stukeleys ===
The Stukeleys (3 seats)
Party	Candidate	Votes	%	±%
Liberal Democrats	Tom Sanderson*	878	45.9	−20.7
Liberal Democrats	Louise Ascroft	670	35.0	N/A
Liberal Democrats	Ann Blackwell*	646	33.8	−20.4
Conservative	Phil Pearce	553	28.9	−6.3
Conservative	Alan Brugnoli	512	26.8	−4.6
Conservative	Sally Smith	490	25.6	−1.7
Reform	Mandy Simmonds	472	24.7	N/A
Reform	Val Cody	466	24.4	N/A
Reform	Suzanna Williams	450	23.5	N/A
Green	Judy Moore	263	13.7	N/A
Labour	Freya Cushman	212	11.1	N/A
Labour	Sikho Ndebele	129	6.7	N/A
Rejected ballots		13		
Turnout		2,122	41.5	+7.5
Registered electors		5,120		
Liberal Democrats hold				
Liberal Democrats gain from Independent				
Liberal Democrats hold				

Note: Both Sanderson and Blackwell were elected as independents in 2022 before joining the Liberal Democrats in 2026

=== Warboys ===
Warboys (2 seats)
Party	Candidate	Votes	%	±%
Conservative	Charlotte Lowe*	895	39.5	−18.2
Conservative	Douglas McIlwain	818	36.1	−16.5
Reform	Alan Garford	722	31.9	N/A
Reform	Sarah Smith	705	31.2	N/A
Liberal Democrats	Sharon Docherty	347	15.3	N/A
Liberal Democrats	Helen Kewley	323	14.3	N/A
Green	Anthony Bailly	289	12.8	−10.1
Green	John Wills	240	10.6	N/A
Labour	Ian Ramsbottom	187	8.3	−17.0
Rejected ballots		10		
Turnout		2,421	41.1	+10.2
Registered electors		5,893		
Conservative hold				
Conservative hold				

=== Yaxley ===
Yaxley (3 seats)
Party	Candidate	Votes	%	±%
Liberal Democrats	Andrew Wood	1,255	43.2	+10.0
Reform	James Francis	1,152	39.7	N/A
Reform	Peter Gammons	1,105	38.1	N/A
Reform	Christopher Reeve	1,088	37.5	N/A
Liberal Democrats	Sally Howell*	1,074	37.0	N/A
Liberal Democrats	Kieran Edwards	801	27.6	N/A
Conservative	Eric Butler*	651	22.4	−28.5
Conservative	Kev Gulson*	616	21.2	−26.4
Conservative	Justin Andrews	472	16.3	−17.3
Green	Max Jephtha	321	11.1	N/A
Labour	Michelle Britton	176	6.1	−16.9
Rejected ballots		6		
Turnout		3,163	38.3	+11.7
Registered electors		8,249		
Liberal Democrats gain from Conservative				
Reform gain from Conservative				
Reform gain from Liberal Democrats				

== By-elections ==
=== St Neots Eynesbury ===
St Neots Eynesbury by-election: 20 August 2026 Resignation of Tony Nelson (Reform)
Party	Candidate	Votes	%	±%
Liberal Democrats	Ian Taylor	1,024	47.9	+29.8
Reform	Steve O'Hara	647	30.3	+3.1
Conservative	Alexander Pushkarev	143	6.7	−3.8
Green	Anna Pritchard	118	5.5	−12.5
Labour	Michael Gilks	104	4.9	N/A
Independent	Daniel Laycock	102	4.8	N/A
Majority		377	17.6	N/A
Turnout		2,140	24.1	−10.9
Registered electors		8,884		
Liberal Democrats gain from Reform		Swing	▲13.4	

Until May 2026, the Independent candidate was active in the Green Party and the Liberal Democrat was an independent councillor for St Neots Eynesbury who lost his seat in the local elections.
