= 1999 Huntingdonshire District Council election =

1999 UK local government election

The 1999 Huntingdonshire District Council election took place on 6 May 1999 to elect members of Huntingdonshire District Council in Cambridgeshire, England. One third of the council was up for election and the Conservative Party stayed in overall control of the council.

After the election, the composition of the council was:

- Conservative 36
- Liberal Democrats 14
- Independent 2
- Vacant 1

== Election result ==
Huntingdonshire local election result 1999
Party	Seats	Gains	Losses	Net gain/loss	Seats %	Votes %	Votes	+/−
Conservative	13	5	2	+3	68.4	47.4	11,005	-4.0%
Liberal Democrats	5	2	2	0	26.3	27.9	6,470	-1.0%
Independent	1	0	0	0	5.3	5.6	1,291	+2.3%
Labour	0	0	3	-3	0	19.0	4,408	+2.6%
UKIP	0	0	0	0	0	0.2	50	+0.2%

== Ward results ==
Earith
Party	Candidate	Votes	%	±%
Conservative	John Eddy	493	53.6	
Liberal Democrats	Owen McLaughlin	335	36.5	
Labour	Valerie Brooker	91	9.9	
Majority		158	17.2	
Turnout		919	29.3	
Conservative hold		Swing		

Ellington
Party	Candidate	Votes	%	±%
Liberal Democrats	Michael Baker	484	52.1	
Conservative	John Lancaster	414	44.6	
Labour	Ruth Pugh	31	3.3	
Majority		70	7.5	
Turnout		929	54.2	
Liberal Democrats gain from Conservative		Swing		

Fenstanton
Party	Candidate	Votes	%	±%
Liberal Democrats	Mark Rainer	481	56.3	
Conservative	Susan Campbell	319	37.4	
Labour	Graham Hitchings	54	6.3	
Majority		162	19.0	
Turnout		854	40.3	
Liberal Democrats gain from Conservative		Swing		

Gransden
Party	Candidate	Votes	%	±%
Conservative	John Gregory	537	73.7	
Liberal Democrats	Caroline Blackburn	135	18.5	
Labour	Sandra Wilcox	57	7.8	
Majority		402	55.1	
Turnout		729	36.1	
Conservative hold		Swing		

Huntingdon North
Party	Candidate	Votes	%	±%
Conservative	Lawrence Simpson	1,143	56.8	−7.6
Labour	Robert Lomax	870	43.2	+7.6
Majority		273	13.6	−15.3
Turnout		2,013	29.6	+2.6
Conservative gain from Labour		Swing		

Huntingdon West
Party	Candidate	Votes	%	±%
Conservative	Thomas Sanderson	830	47.5	−1.8
Labour	George Beevor	661	37.8	−4.1
Liberal Democrats	Richard Wyatt	206	11.8	+3.1
UKIP	Derek Norman	50	2.9	+2.9
Majority		169	9.7	+2.3
Turnout		1,747	25.6	+0.6
Conservative gain from Labour		Swing		

Needingworth
Party	Candidate	Votes	%	±%
Conservative	Paul Brant	383	46.1	
Independent	Eileen Gray	372	44.8	
Labour	Carole Hitchings	76	9.1	
Majority		11	1.3	
Turnout		831	42.1	
Conservative hold		Swing		

Ramsey
Party	Candidate	Votes	%	±%
Conservative	Phillip Swales	666	56.3	−8.0
Independent	Raymond Powell	231	19.5	+19.5
Labour	Raymond Atkins	144	12.2	−6.8
Liberal Democrats	Malcolm Wheatley	142	12.0	−4.8
Majority		435	36.8	−8.5
Turnout		1,183	20.8	−1.8
Conservative hold		Swing		

Somersham
Party	Candidate	Votes	%	±%
Liberal Democrats	Anthony Hulme	522	49.4	
Conservative	Harriett Skeggs	464	43.9	
Labour	William Hollyer	70	6.6	
Majority		58	5.5	
Turnout		1,056	37.9	
Liberal Democrats hold		Swing		

St. Ives South
Party	Candidate	Votes	%	±%
Conservative	Preeva Newbon	1,089	48.9	
Liberal Democrats	John Souter	987	44.3	
Labour	John Watson	153	6.9	
Majority		102	4.6	
Turnout		2,229	44.5	
Conservative hold		Swing		

St. Neots Eaton Ford
Party	Candidate	Votes	%	±%
Conservative	Duncan Simmonds	604	47.5	
Liberal Democrats	Christine Colbert	562	44.2	
Labour	Peter Boyce	106	8.3	
Majority		42	3.3	
Turnout		1,272	32.4	
Conservative gain from Liberal Democrats		Swing		

St. Neots Eaton Socon
Party	Candidate	Votes	%	±%
Liberal Democrats	Derek Giles	909	59.8	
Conservative	Rodney Farrar	482	31.7	
Labour	David Nicholls	129	8.5	
Majority		427	28.1	
Turnout		1,520	28.6	
Liberal Democrats hold		Swing		

St. Neots Eynesbury (2 seats)
Party	Candidate	Votes	%	±%
Conservative	Paul Adams	559		
Conservative	Andrew Hansard	537		
Liberal Democrats	Ian Webb	393		
Liberal Democrats	Robert Eaton	380		
Labour	Janet Boston	351		
Labour	Patricia Nicholls	343		
Turnout		2,563	23.2	+4.6
Conservative hold		Swing		
Conservative gain from Liberal Democrats		Swing		

St. Neots Priory Park
Party	Candidate	Votes	%	±%
Liberal Democrats	Sheila Shorten	670	52.9	+1.1
Conservative	Robert Law	455	35.9	−0.9
Labour	William O'Connor	141	11.1	−0.4
Majority		215	17.0	+2.0
Turnout		1,266	31.8	−1.1
Liberal Democrats hold		Swing		

Staughton
Party	Candidate	Votes	%	±%
Independent	Archibald "Hugh" Duberly	688	63.9	
Conservative	William Sinclair	205	19.0	
Liberal Democrats	Malcolm Howlett	110	10.2	
Labour	David Brown	74	6.9	
Majority		483	44.8	
Turnout		1,077	52.9	
Independent hold		Swing		

Stilton
Party	Candidate	Votes	%	±%
Conservative	Doris Crossman	736	65.7	
Labour	Robert Fairhead	385	34.3	
Majority		351	31.3	
Turnout		1,121	37.3	
Conservative hold		Swing		

Upwood and The Raveleys
Party	Candidate	Votes	%	±%
Conservative	Florence Densham	268	55.7	
Liberal Democrats	Karen Buckley	154	32.0	
Labour	Graeme Watkins	59	12.3	
Majority		114	23.7	
Turnout		481	36.3	
Conservative hold		Swing		

Yaxley
Party	Candidate	Votes	%	±%
Conservative	John Watt	821	57.3	
Labour	Kevin Goddard	613	42.7	
Majority		208	14.5	
Turnout		1,434	29.2	
Conservative gain from Labour		Swing		

== By-elections between 1999 and 2000 ==
Huntingdon North by-election 3 June 1999
Party	Candidate	Votes	%	±%
Conservative		679	70.7	+13.9
Labour		281	29.3	−13.9
Majority		398	41.5	+27.9
Turnout		960	14.0	−15.6
Conservative hold		Swing		
