= 2004 Huntingdonshire District Council election =

2004 UK local government election

Map of the results of the 2004 Huntingdonshire District Council election. Conservatives in blue, Liberal Democrats in yellow and independents in grey.

The 2004 Huntingdonshire District Council election took place on 10 June 2004 to elect members of Huntingdonshire District Council in Cambridgeshire, England. The whole council was up for election after boundary changes reduced the number of seats by 1. The Conservative Party stayed in overall control of the council.

== Election result ==
Huntingdonshire local election result 2004
Party	Seats	Gains	Losses	Net gain/loss	Seats %	Votes %	Votes	+/−
Conservative	40			+3	76.9	53.2	46,927	+2.5%
Liberal Democrats	10			-3	19.2	33.3	29,342	-3.9%
Independent	2			-1	3.8	3.2	2,805	+1.7%
Labour	0			0	0	8.9	7,818	-1.7%
UKIP	0			0	0	1.1	972	+1.1%
Green	0			0	0	0.3	225	+0.3%
Legalise Cannabis	0			0	0	0.1	77	+0.1%

== Ward results ==
Alconbury and The Stukeleys
Party	Candidate	Votes	%	±%
Conservative	Sarah Vanbergen	823	64.0	
Liberal Democrats	Ann Monk	230	17.9	
UKIP	Robin Wade	160	12.5	
Labour	Shirley Brown	72	5.6	
Majority		593	46.1	
Turnout		1,285	51.2	

Brampton (2 seats)
Party	Candidate	Votes	%	±%
Liberal Democrats	Peter Downes	1,516		
Liberal Democrats	Shirley Menczer	1,295		
Conservative	Chan Abraham	973		
Conservative	Ian Gardener	922		
Labour	Deirdre Lee	92		
Labour	Darren Hufford	91		
Turnout		4,889	56.1	

Buckden
Party	Candidate	Votes	%	±%
Liberal Democrats	William Clough	761	51.6	
Conservative	Richard Bailey	665	45.1	
Labour	Colin Greer	48	3.3	
Majority		96	6.5	
Turnout		1,474	58.6	

Earith (2 seats)
Party	Candidate	Votes	%	±%
Conservative	John Eddy	1,031		
Conservative	Terence Rogers	856		
Liberal Democrats	Owen McLaughlin	569		
Liberal Democrats	Malcolm Robelou	433		
Labour	Sharon Nania	228		
Turnout		3,117	39.0	

Ellington
Party	Candidate	Votes	%	±%
Liberal Democrats	Michael Baker	705	59.4	
Conservative	Peter Brooker	435	36.6	
Labour	David Brown	47	4.0	
Majority		270	22.8	
Turnout		1,187	53.5	

Elton and Folksworth
Party	Candidate	Votes	%	±%
Conservative	Nicholas Guyatt	648	66.7	
Liberal Democrats	Dominic Masterson	177	18.2	
Labour	Mark Holman	146	15.0	
Majority		471	48.5	
Turnout		971	46.7	

Fenstanton
Party	Candidate	Votes	%	±%
Conservative	Jean Chandler	462	50.3	
Liberal Democrats	Mark Rainer	402	43.7	
Labour	Jonathan Eason	55	6.0	
Majority		60	6.6	
Turnout		919	40.6	

Godmanchester (2 seats)
Party	Candidate	Votes	%	±%
Conservative	Carol Godley	1,070		
Conservative	Colin Hyams	753		
Liberal Democrats	Charles Looker	746		
Liberal Democrats	Lynda Heseltine	603		
Labour	Marilyn Jones	178		
Labour	John Turner	119		
Turnout		3,469	43.9	

Gransden and The Offords (2 seats)
Party	Candidate	Votes	%	±%
Conservative	Barbara Boddington	1,182		
Conservative	Alec Stenner	997		
Liberal Democrats	Anna Hayward	415		
Liberal Democrats	Paul Speers	317		
Labour	Thelma Lomax	170		
Turnout		3,081	49.2	

Huntingdon East (3 seats)
Party	Candidate	Votes	%	±%
Conservative	James Fell	1,236		
Conservative	Lawrence Simpson	1,146		
Conservative	Derek Holley	1,114		
Liberal Democrats	David Priestman	1,040		
Liberal Democrats	Richard Wyatt	988		
Liberal Democrats	Michael Shellens	960		
UKIP	Leonard Bruce	442		
Labour	Carole Hitchings	297		
Labour	Robert Pugh	289		
Labour	David King	272		
Turnout		7,784	40.7	

Huntingdon North (2 seats)
Party	Candidate	Votes	%	±%
Conservative	Jeffery Dutton	466		
Conservative	Margaret Wheeler	448		
Labour	Ann Beevor	327		
Labour	Graham Hitchings	271		
Liberal Democrats	John Morgan	195		
Liberal Democrats	Toby Fisher	186		
Turnout		1,893	28.2	

Huntingdon West (2 seats)
Party	Candidate	Votes	%	±%
Conservative	Thomas Sanderson	1,021		
Conservative	John Sadler	954		
Liberal Democrats	Michael Burrell	182		
UKIP	Derek Norman	172		
Labour	Ruth Pugh	167		
Liberal Democrats	Veronica Hufford	165		
Labour	Phyllis Gibson	159		
Turnout		2,820	38.9	

Kimbolton and Staughton
Party	Candidate	Votes	%	±%
Conservative	Jonathan Gray	790	62.6	
UKIP	Jennifer O'Dell	198	15.7	
Liberal Democrats	Anthony Withers	190	15.1	
Labour	Catherine Gillinder	83	6.6	
Majority		592	46.9	
Turnout		1,261	52.3	

Little Paxton
Party	Candidate	Votes	%	±%
Conservative	Robert Clarke	811	70.0	
Liberal Democrats	Paul Main	272	23.5	
Labour	Janet Boston	75	6.5	
Majority		539	46.5	
Turnout		1,158	48.8	

Ramsey (3 seats)
Party	Candidate	Votes	%	±%
Conservative	Phillip Swales	1,072		
Conservative	Ian Muir	1,003		
Liberal Democrats	Raymond Powell	939		
Conservative	Norah Wagstaffe	933		
Liberal Democrats	Janet Dutton	763		
Liberal Democrats	Alastair Taylor	596		
Labour	Carol Harper	218		
Labour	Aidan Hervey	182		
Turnout		5,706	37.0	

Sawtry (2 seats)
Party	Candidate	Votes	%	±%
Independent	Richard Tuplin	1,513		
Independent	John Garner	1,292		
Conservative	Marlene Johnson	665		
Labour	Mary Howell	159		
Turnout		3,629	43.0	

Somersham (2 seats)
Party	Candidate	Votes	%	±%
Conservative	Stephen Criswell	1,227		
Conservative	Michael Newman	1,052		
Liberal Democrats	Anthony Hulme	733		
Liberal Democrats	Leona Graham-Elen	572		
Labour	Karen Webb	145		
Legalise Cannabis	Marcus Davies	77		
Turnout		3,806	46.6	

St Ives East (2 seats)
Party	Candidate	Votes	%	±%
Conservative	Jason Ablewhite	912		
Conservative	Deborah Reynolds	889		
Liberal Democrats	David Hodge	478		
Liberal Democrats	Robin Waters	407		
Labour	David Brown	216		
Labour	Angela Richards	210		
Turnout		3,112	34.9	

St Ives South (2 seats)
Party	Candidate	Votes	%	±%
Conservative	John Davies	1,110		
Conservative	Douglas Dew	1,014		
Liberal Democrats	Angela Bush	619		
Liberal Democrats	Gilly Jackson	516		
Labour	Richard Allen	193		
Labour	John Watson	157		
Turnout		3,609	39.9	

St Ives West
Party	Candidate	Votes	%	±%
Conservative	Kevin Reynolds	492	50.3	
Liberal Democrats	Deborah Townsend	408	41.7	
Labour	David Nelson	78	8.0	
Majority		84	8.6	
Turnout		978	43.6	

St Neots Eaton Ford (2 seats)
Party	Candidate	Votes	%	±%
Conservative	Kathleen Gregory	1,162		
Conservative	David Harty	992		
Liberal Democrats	Sandra Giles	891		
Liberal Democrats	Derek Cooper	830		
Labour	David Nicholls	163		
Turnout		4,038	41.8	

St Neots Eaton Socon (2 seats)
Party	Candidate	Votes	%	±%
Liberal Democrats	Derek Giles	680		
Liberal Democrats	Gordon Thorpe	650		
Conservative	Rodney Farrer	608		
Conservative	Elaine Kadic	514		
Labour	Douglas Brown	128		
Turnout		2,580	33.3	

St Neots Eynesbury (3 seats)
Party	Candidate	Votes	%	±%
Conservative	Andrew Hansard	933		
Liberal Democrats	Diana Collins	910		
Liberal Democrats	Ian Taylor	872		
Conservative	Paul Ursell	832		
Liberal Democrats	Patricia Hopewell	819		
Conservative	Alan Mackender-Lawrence	725		
Labour	George Harrison	286		
Turnout		5,377	30.1	

St Neots Priory Park (2 seats)
Party	Candidate	Votes	%	±%
Conservative	Paula Longford	930		
Conservative	Nicholas Finnie	878		
Liberal Democrats	Thomas Mumford	550		
Liberal Democrats	Robert Eaton	528		
Labour	William O'Connor	178		
Turnout		3,064	37.2	

Stilton
Party	Candidate	Votes	%	±%
Conservative	Peter Mitchell	688	63.9	
Liberal Democrats	John Davidson	291	27.0	
Labour	Steven Hicks	98	9.1	
Majority		397	36.9	
Turnout		1,077	46.5	

The Hemingfords (2 seats)
Party	Candidate	Votes	%	±%
Conservative	Ian Bates	1,336		
Conservative	Christopher Stephens	1,210		
Liberal Democrats	Andrew Dickson	842		
Liberal Democrats	Brian Wallis	832		
Green	Donald Walton	225		
Labour	Philip Sly	121		
Labour	Rosalie Trayner	117		
Turnout		4,683	55.4	

Upwood and The Raveleys
Party	Candidate	Votes	%	±%
Conservative	John Bell	468	48.7	
Liberal Democrats	John Souter	436	45.4	
Labour	Susan Coomey	57	5.9	
Majority		32	3.3	
Turnout		961	40.2	

Warboys and Bury (2 seats)
Party	Candidate	Votes	%	±%
Liberal Democrats	Jack Taylor	1,051		
Conservative	Peter Bucknell	1,008		
Conservative	Richard Normington	929		
Liberal Democrats	Terence Palmer	782		
Labour	Marie Baker	162		
Turnout		3,932	47.3	

Yaxley and Farcet (3 seats)
Party	Candidate	Votes	%	±%
Conservative	John Watt	1,726		
Conservative	Eric Butler	1,619		
Conservative	Madhabi Banerjee	1,197		
Labour	Kevin Goddard	622		
Labour	Graeme Watkins	617		
Labour	Margaret Cochrane	525		
Turnout		6,306	32.5	

== By-elections between 2004 and 2006 ==
Little Paxton by-election 5 May 2005
Party	Candidate	Votes	%	±%
Conservative	Kenneth Churchill	920	56.7	−13.3
Liberal Democrats	Allan Hunt	703	43.3	+19.8
Majority		217	13.4	−33.1
Turnout		1,623	69.0	+20.2
Conservative hold		Swing		
