= 2011 Huntingdonshire District Council election =

2011 UK local government election

Map of the results of the 2011 Huntingdonshire District Council election. Conservatives in blue, Liberal Democrats in yellow and UK Independence Party in purple. Wards in dark grey were not contested in 2011.

The 2011 Huntingdonshire District Council election took place on 5 May 2011 to elect members of Huntingdonshire District Council in Cambridgeshire, England. One third of the council was up for election and the Conservative Party stayed in overall control of the council.

After the election, the composition of the council was:

- Conservative 41
- Liberal Democrats 8
- UK Independence Party 2
- Independent 1

== Background ==
The leader of the council, Conservative Ian Bates, stood down at the election. Jason Ablewhite was chosen as the new leader by the Conservatives in March 2011, defeating councillor Doug Dew. Other councillors who stood down at the election included Mike Newman who has been a member of the council since the 1970s and the deputy leader of the council Mike Simpson. The Conservatives, Liberal Democrats and Labour contested most seats along with a number of candidates from the UK Independence Party and one independent in St Ives South.

== Election result ==
The Conservatives gained 4 seats from the Liberal Democrats to win 19 of the 22 seats on the council that were contested. The Liberal Democrats won only 2 seats at the election, with the party losing Kendal Cooper in St Neots Priory Park and Gordon Thorpe in St Neots Eaton Socon, as well as seats in Fenstanton and Huntingdon North. Meanwhile, the UK Independence Party won 1 seat in Ramsey, but also took control of Ramsey Town Council, the first council the party took control of in the United Kingdom. Labour failed to win any seats, but did get an increased vote share and got within 41 votes in Huntingdon North.

Huntingdonshire local election result 2011
Party	Seats	Gains	Losses	Net gain/loss	Seats %	Votes %	Votes	+/−
Conservative	19	4	0	+4	86.4	55.1	23,438	+7.5%
Liberal Democrats	2	0	4	-4	9.1	21.6	9,209	-10.7%
UKIP	1	0	0	0	4.5	8.2	3,492	-0.5%
Labour	0	0	0	0	0	13.2	5,624	+3.1%
Independent	0	0	0	0	0	1.9	811	+1.4%

== Ward results ==
Brampton
Party	Candidate	Votes	%	±%
Liberal Democrats	Patricia Jordan	1,254	50.2	−7.1
Conservative	Florendia Theodorou	1,027	41.1	+0.3
Labour	Marion Kadewere	216	8.7	+6.7
Majority		227	9.1	−7.4
Turnout		2,497	53.4	+1.2
Liberal Democrats hold		Swing		

Earith
Party	Candidate	Votes	%	±%
Conservative	Philip Godfrey	1,410	61.7	+8.1
Labour	Iain Ramsbottom	335	14.7	+6.3
Liberal Democrats	Anthony Hulme	323	14.1	−13.7
UKIP	Raymond Zetter	217	9.5	−0.6
Majority		1,075	47.0	+21.2
Turnout		2,285	48.3	−26.2
Conservative hold		Swing		

Ellington
Party	Candidate	Votes	%	±%
Liberal Democrats	Michael Baker	755	53.0	−4.1
Conservative	James Bevan	567	39.8	−3.1
Labour	Kevin Goddard	102	7.2	+7.2
Majority		188	13.2	−1.0
Turnout		1,424	60.8	+2.9
Liberal Democrats hold		Swing		

Fenstanton
Party	Candidate	Votes	%	±%
Conservative	Gregory Harlock	666	56.0	+7.8
Liberal Democrats	Colin Saunderson	365	30.7	−16.2
Labour	Angela Richards	158	13.3	+8.4
Majority		301	25.3	+24.0
Turnout		1,189	49.9	+12.2
Conservative gain from Liberal Democrats		Swing		

Gransden and the Offords
Party	Candidate	Votes	%	±%
Conservative	Barbara Boddington	1,450	76.6	+14.1
Liberal Democrats	Anna Hayward	223	11.8	−17.5
Labour	Idris Davies	220	11.6	+3.4
Majority		1,227	64.8	+31.6
Turnout		1,893	52.9	−23.8
Conservative hold		Swing		

Huntingdon East
Party	Candidate	Votes	%	±%
Conservative	Saeed Akthar	1,424	49.0	+9.7
Liberal Democrats	Kevin Sumner	989	34.0	−12.2
Labour	Ruth Pugh	492	16.9	+6.8
Majority		435	15.0	
Turnout		2,905	43.0	−21.8
Conservative hold		Swing		

Huntingdon North
Party	Candidate	Votes	%	±%
Conservative	Alan Mackender-Lawrence	385	34.1	−13.1
Labour	Patrick Kadewere	344	30.5	+15.8
Liberal Democrats	Patricia Shrapnel	218	19.3	−10.6
UKIP	Peter Ashcroft	181	16.0	+7.7
Majority		41	3.6	−13.6
Turnout		1,128	30.4	+4.3
Conservative gain from Liberal Democrats		Swing		

Huntingdon West
Party	Candidate	Votes	%	±%
Conservative	Thomas Sanderson	1,165	62.6	+14.8
Labour	David King	283	15.2	+2.5
Liberal Democrats	Michael Burrell	280	15.1	−15.2
UKIP	Derek Norman	132	7.1	+0.7
Majority		882	47.4	+29.9
Turnout		1,860	39.7	−23.3
Conservative hold		Swing		

Kimbolton and Staughton
Party	Candidate	Votes	%	±%
Conservative	Jonathan Gray	1,043	71.5	−2.3
Liberal Democrats	Roy Benford	192	13.2	−10.3
UKIP	Jennifer O'Dell	112	7.7	+7.7
Labour	David Underwood	111	7.6	+4.9
Majority		851	58.4	+8.1
Turnout		1,458	57.9	+3.9
Conservative hold		Swing		

Little Paxton
Party	Candidate	Votes	%	±%
Conservative	Kenneth Churchill	898	74.5	+5.4
Liberal Democrats	Alan Cummings	159	13.2	+7.6
Labour	Steven Sweeney	149	12.4	+8.0
Majority		739	61.3	+9.0
Turnout		1,206	46.0	−2.0
Conservative hold		Swing		

Ramsey
Party	Candidate	Votes	%	±%
UKIP	Ian Curtis	1,503	53.1	+8.0
Conservative	Susan Normington	1,016	35.9	−0.5
Labour	Susan Coomey	309	10.9	+5.2
Majority		487	17.2	+8.5
Turnout		2,828	43.9	−22.2
UKIP hold		Swing		

Somersham
Party	Candidate	Votes	%	±%
Conservative	Graham Bull	1,255	59.6	−3.8
Liberal Democrats	Anthony Jebson	357	17.0	−11.3
Labour	David Brown	287	13.6	+9.9
UKIP	Michael Horwood	206	9.8	+5.3
Majority		898	42.7	+7.6
Turnout		2,105	46.3	+7.0
Conservative hold		Swing		

St. Ives South
Party	Candidate	Votes	%	±%
Conservative	John Davies	1,066	47.0	0.0
Independent	Jonathan Salt	811	35.7	+35.7
Labour	Richard Allen	175	7.7	−2.3
Liberal Democrats	John Oliver	114	5.0	−26.9
UKIP	Paul Bullen	103	4.5	−2.2
Majority		255	11.2	−3.9
Turnout		2,269	45.3	−19.8
Conservative hold		Swing		

St. Neots Eaton Ford
Party	Candidate	Votes	%	±%
Conservative	David Harty	1,549	68.7	+7.6
Liberal Democrats	Eleanor Mason	707	31.3	+1.0
Majority		842	37.3	+6.6
Turnout		2,256	43.7	+8.9
Conservative hold		Swing		

St. Neots Eaton Socon (2 seats)
Party	Candidate	Votes	%	±%
Conservative	Roger Harrison	815		
Conservative	Andrew Jennings	709		
Liberal Democrats	Julia Hayward	553		
Liberal Democrats	Gordon Thorpe	464		
Labour	David Nicholls	236		
Labour	Patricia Nicholls	223		
Turnout		3,000	37.2	−0.6
Conservative gain from Liberal Democrats		Swing		
Conservative hold		Swing		

St. Neots Eynesbury
Party	Candidate	Votes	%	±%
Conservative	Paul Ursell	1,081	45.2	+9.4
Liberal Democrats	Robert Moores	767	32.1	−12.0
Labour	William O'Connor	545	22.8	+11.0
Majority		314	13.1	+4.9
Turnout		2,393	32.9	−27.1
Conservative hold		Swing		

St. Neots Priory Park
Party	Candidate	Votes	%	±%
Conservative	Paula Longford	1,204	55.8	+6.4
Liberal Democrats	Kendal Cooper	582	27.0	−13.2
Labour	Emlyn Rees	371	17.2	+6.8
Majority		622	28.8	+19.6
Turnout		2,157	41.3	−24.1
Conservative gain from Liberal Democrats		Swing		

Stilton
Party	Candidate	Votes	%	±%
Conservative	Peter Mitchell	655	59.8	−21.5
Labour	Mary Howell	177	16.1	−2.6
UKIP	Roger Henson	174	15.9	+15.9
Liberal Democrats	Christopher Waites	90	8.2	+8.2
Majority		478	43.6	−19.0
Turnout		1,096	46.9	+7.0
Conservative hold		Swing		

The Hemingfords
Party	Candidate	Votes	%	±%
Conservative	Alan Williams	1,675	62.7	+5.5
Liberal Democrats	David Priestman	506	18.9	−7.7
Labour	John Watson	286	10.7	+2.7
UKIP	James Finnie	205	7.7	+7.7
Majority		1,169	43.8	+13.2
Turnout		2,672	55.8	−21.6
Conservative hold		Swing		

Upwood and the Raveleys
Party	Candidate	Votes	%	±%
Conservative	Robin Howe	602	56.9	+2.3
UKIP	Robert Brown	252	23.8	+3.8
Liberal Democrats	Patricia Worgan	125	11.8	−9.4
Labour	Graeme Watkins	79	7.5	+3.4
Majority		350	33.1	−0.3
Turnout		1,058	44.6	+11.4
Conservative hold		Swing		

Yaxley and Farcet
Party	Candidate	Votes	%	±%
Conservative	Eric Butler	1,776	61.3	+13.0
Labour	Margaret Cochrane	526	18.2	−0.3
UKIP	John Hyland	407	14.1	+1.4
Liberal Democrats	Martin Land	186	6.4	−14.1
Majority		1,250	43.2	+15.4
Turnout		2,895	36.6	−27.1
Conservative hold		Swing		
