= 2000 Huntingdonshire District Council election =

2000 UK local government election

The 2000 Huntingdonshire District Council election took place on 4 May 2000 to elect members of Huntingdonshire District Council in Cambridgeshire, England. One third of the council was up for election and the Conservative Party stayed in overall control of the council.

After the election, the composition of the council was:

- Conservative 37
- Liberal Democrats 13
- Independent 3

== Election result ==
Huntingdonshire local election result 2000
| Party | Seats | Gains | Losses | Net gain/loss | Seats % | Votes % | Votes | +/− |
|---|---|---|---|---|---|---|---|---|
| Conservative | 13 | 2 | 2 | 0 | 76.5 | 55.7 | 13,345 | +8.3% |
| Liberal Democrats | 3 | 1 | 2 | -1 | 17.6 | 27.6 | 6,607 | -0.3% |
| Independent | 1 | 1 | 0 | +1 | 5.9 | 3.3 | 784 | -2.3% |
| Labour | 0 | 0 | 0 | 0 | 0 | 12.6 | 3,027 | -6.4% |
| UKIP | 0 | 0 | 0 | 0 | 0 | 0.9 | 213 | +0.7% |

== Ward results ==
Brampton
| Party | Candidate | Votes | % | ±% |
|---|---|---|---|---|
| Liberal Democrats | Peter Downes | 962 | 50.9 | −0.9 |
| Conservative | William Sinclair | 852 | 45.1 | −0.7 |
| UKIP | Albert Bentley | 40 | 2.1 | +2.1 |
| Labour | Carol Hitchings | 35 | 1.9 | −0.5 |
| Majority | | 110 | 5.8 | −0.2 |
| Turnout | | 1,889 | 54.1 | +3.3 |
| Liberal Democrats hold | | Swing | | |

Earith
| Party | Candidate | Votes | % | ±% |
|---|---|---|---|---|
| Conservative | Terence Rogers | 557 | 54.1 | +0.5 |
| Liberal Democrats | Joyce James | 416 | 40.4 | +3.9 |
| Labour | Graeme Watkins | 57 | 5.5 | −4.4 |
| Majority | | 141 | 13.7 | −3.5 |
| Turnout | | 1,030 | 32.3 | +3.0 |
| Conservative gain from Liberal Democrats | | Swing | | |

Godmanchester
| Party | Candidate | Votes | % | ±% |
|---|---|---|---|---|
| Liberal Democrats | Carol Godley | 779 | 49.4 | +7.5 |
| Conservative | Alan Goff | 685 | 43.4 | −2.3 |
| Labour | Graham Hitchings | 114 | 7.2 | −5.2 |
| Majority | | 94 | 6.0 | |
| Turnout | | 1,578 | 35.4 | +7.5 |
| Liberal Democrats gain from Conservative | | Swing | | |

Hemingford Abbots and Hilton
| Party | Candidate | Votes | % | ±% |
|---|---|---|---|---|
| Conservative | Ian Bates | 438 | 68.8 | |
| Liberal Democrats | Jennifer Sefton | 164 | 25.7 | |
| Labour | Ruth Pugh | 35 | 5.5 | |
| Majority | | 274 | 43.1 | |
| Turnout | | 637 | 50.8 | |
| Conservative hold | | Swing | | |

Huntingdon North
| Party | Candidate | Votes | % | ±% |
|---|---|---|---|---|
| Conservative | James Fell | 1,229 | 66.8 | +10.0 |
| Labour | Ann Beevor | 611 | 33.2 | −10.0 |
| Majority | | 618 | 33.6 | +20.0 |
| Turnout | | 1,840 | 26.7 | −2.9 |
| Conservative hold | | Swing | | |

Huntingdon West
| Party | Candidate | Votes | % | ±% |
|---|---|---|---|---|
| Conservative | Derek Holley | 882 | 55.4 | +7.9 |
| Labour | Valerie Brooker | 440 | 27.6 | −10.2 |
| Liberal Democrats | Richard Wyatt | 198 | 12.4 | +0.6 |
| UKIP | Derek Norman | 73 | 4.6 | +1.7 |
| Majority | | 442 | 27.7 | +18.0 |
| Turnout | | 1,593 | 23.5 | −2.1 |
| Conservative hold | | Swing | | |

Kimbolton
| Party | Candidate | Votes | % | ±% |
|---|---|---|---|---|
| Conservative | James Mugglestone | 581 | 81.6 | |
| Labour | George Beevor | 86 | 12.1 | |
| UKIP | Stephen Poppitt | 45 | 6.3 | |
| Majority | | 495 | 69.5 | |
| Turnout | | 712 | 43.4 | |
| Conservative hold | | Swing | | |

Paxton
| Party | Candidate | Votes | % | ±% |
|---|---|---|---|---|
| Conservative | Robert Clarke | 885 | 66.9 | |
| Liberal Democrats | John Grosvenor | 387 | 29.3 | |
| Labour | Janet Boston | 51 | 3.9 | |
| Majority | | 498 | 37.6 | |
| Turnout | | 1,323 | 47.2 | |
| Conservative gain from Liberal Democrats | | Swing | | |

Ramsey
| Party | Candidate | Votes | % | ±% |
|---|---|---|---|---|
| Conservative | Norah Wagstaffe | 765 | 51.5 | −4.8 |
| Liberal Democrats | Raymond Powell | 620 | 41.8 | +29.8 |
| Labour | Keith Bennett | 100 | 6.7 | −5.5 |
| Majority | | 145 | 9.8 | −27.0 |
| Turnout | | 1,485 | 25.5 | +4.7 |
| Conservative hold | | Swing | | |

Sawtry
| Party | Candidate | Votes | % | ±% |
|---|---|---|---|---|
| Independent | John Garner | 784 | 51.7 | +3.6 |
| Conservative | David Bowens | 620 | 40.9 | +4.4 |
| Labour | Robert Fairhead | 112 | 7.4 | −1.5 |
| Majority | | 164 | 10.8 | −0.8 |
| Turnout | | 1,516 | 33.5 | +1.0 |
| Independent gain from Conservative | | Swing | | |

St. Ives North
| Party | Candidate | Votes | % | ±% |
|---|---|---|---|---|
| Conservative | Kevin Reynolds | 1,080 | 62.4 | −1.9 |
| Liberal Democrats | Angela Bush | 415 | 24.0 | +4.6 |
| Labour | Michael Sneath | 180 | 10.4 | −5.9 |
| UKIP | Philip Pitt | 55 | 3.2 | +3.2 |
| Majority | | 665 | 38.4 | −6.5 |
| Turnout | | 1,730 | 25.5 | +5.0 |
| Conservative hold | | Swing | | |

St. Ives South
| Party | Candidate | Votes | % | ±% |
|---|---|---|---|---|
| Conservative | John Davies | 1,173 | 59.0 | +10.1 |
| Liberal Democrats | John Souter | 655 | 32.9 | −11.4 |
| Labour | John Watson | 160 | 8.0 | +1.1 |
| Majority | | 518 | 26.1 | +21.5 |
| Turnout | | 1,988 | 39.4 | −5.1 |
| Conservative hold | | Swing | | |

St. Neots Eaton Ford
| Party | Candidate | Votes | % | ±% |
|---|---|---|---|---|
| Conservative | Kathleen Gregory | 815 | 67.0 | +19.5 |
| Liberal Democrats | Robert Eaton | 295 | 24.3 | −19.9 |
| Labour | David Nicholls | 106 | 8.7 | +0.4 |
| Majority | | 520 | 42.8 | +39.5 |
| Turnout | | 1,216 | 30.8 | −1.6 |
| Conservative hold | | Swing | | |

St. Neots Eaton Socon
| Party | Candidate | Votes | % | ±% |
|---|---|---|---|---|
| Liberal Democrats | Gareth Howe | 817 | 55.5 | −4.3 |
| Conservative | Michael Arnold | 560 | 38.0 | +6.3 |
| Labour | Patricia Nicholls | 95 | 6.5 | −2.0 |
| Majority | | 257 | 17.5 | −10.6 |
| Turnout | | 1,472 | 27.1 | −1.5 |
| Liberal Democrats hold | | Swing | | |

St. Neots Eynesbury
| Party | Candidate | Votes | % | ±% |
|---|---|---|---|---|
| Conservative | Robert Barnes | 588 | 48.2 | |
| Liberal Democrats | Sheila Coates | 418 | 34.3 | |
| Labour | William O'Connor | 214 | 17.5 | |
| Majority | | 170 | 13.9 | |
| Turnout | | 1,220 | 21.4 | −1.8 |
| Conservative hold | | Swing | | |

Warboys
| Party | Candidate | Votes | % | ±% |
|---|---|---|---|---|
| Conservative | Michael Newman | 889 | 62.6 | +27.2 |
| Liberal Democrats | Nicholas Wells | 481 | 33.8 | −27.1 |
| Labour | David Brown | 51 | 3.6 | −0.1 |
| Majority | | 408 | 28.8 | |
| Turnout | | 1,421 | 35.0 | −6.9 |
| Conservative hold | | Swing | | |

Yaxley
| Party | Candidate | Votes | % | ±% |
|---|---|---|---|---|
| Conservative | Madhabi Banerjee | 746 | 56.3 | −1.0 |
| Labour | Kevin Goddard | 580 | 43.7 | +1.0 |
| Majority | | 166 | 12.5 | −2.0 |
| Turnout | | 1,326 | 27.0 | −2.2 |
| Conservative hold | | Swing | | |

== By-elections between 2000 and 2002 ==
=== Upwood and the Raveleys ===
Upwood and the Raveleys by-election 8 March 2001
| Party | Candidate | Votes | % | ±% |
|---|---|---|---|---|
| Conservative | | 270 | 49.4 | −6.3 |
| Liberal Democrats | | 251 | 45.9 | +13.9 |
| Labour | | 26 | 4.8 | −7.5 |
| Majority | | 19 | 3.5 | −20.2 |
| Turnout | | 547 | 38.2 | +1.9 |
| Conservative hold | | Swing | | |

=== Eynesbury ===
Eynesbury by-election 7 June 2001
| Party | Candidate | Votes | % | ±% |
|---|---|---|---|---|
| Conservative | | 1,265 | 41.5 | −6.7 |
| Labour | | 917 | 30.1 | +12.6 |
| Liberal Democrats | | 863 | 28.3 | −6.0 |
| Majority | | 348 | 11.4 | −2.5 |
| Turnout | | 3,045 | | |
| Conservative hold | | Swing | | |

=== Farcet ===
Farcet by-election 7 June 2001
| Party | Candidate | Votes | % | ±% |
|---|---|---|---|---|
| Conservative | | 376 | 48.3 | −5.4 |
| Labour | | 309 | 39.7 | −3.1 |
| Liberal Democrats | | 94 | 12.1 | +8.6 |
| Majority | | 67 | 8.6 | −2.4 |
| Turnout | | 779 | | |
| Conservative hold | | Swing | | |

=== Gransden ===
Gransden by-election 7 June 2001
| Party | Candidate | Votes | % | ±% |
|---|---|---|---|---|
| Conservative | | 819 | 61.9 | −11.8 |
| Liberal Democrats | | 505 | 38.1 | +19.6 |
| Majority | | 314 | 23.7 | −31.4 |
| Turnout | | 1,324 | | |
| Conservative hold | | Swing | | |

=== Eaton Socon ===
Eaton Socon by-election 21 March 2002
| Party | Candidate | Votes | % | ±% |
|---|---|---|---|---|
| Liberal Democrats | | 992 | 63.3 | +7.8 |
| Conservative | | 576 | 36.7 | −1.3 |
| Majority | | 416 | 26.5 | +9.0 |
| Turnout | | 1,568 | 28.6 | +1.5 |
| Liberal Democrats hold | | Swing | | |
