= 2008 Huntingdonshire District Council election =

2008 UK local government election

Map of the results of the 2008 Huntingdonshire District Council election. Conservatives in blue, Liberal Democrats in yellow and independents in light grey. Wards in dark grey were not contested in 2008.

The 2008 Huntingdonshire District Council election took place on 1 May 2008 to elect members of Huntingdonshire District Council in Cambridgeshire, England. One third of the council was up for election and the Conservative Party stayed in overall control of the council.

After the election, the composition of the council was:

- Conservative 38
- Liberal Democrats 12
- Independent 2

== Background ==
Before the election the Conservatives controlled the council with 39 seats, compared to 11 Liberal Democrats and 2 independents. 18 seats were contested at the election by a total of 69 candidates, with the Conservatives defending 14 of the seats.

Among the councillors who were defending seats were the Conservative leader of the council, Ian Bates, in The Hemingfords ward, and the leader of the Liberal Democrats on the council, Peter Downes in Brampton. Ian Bates was challenged by an independent candidate, Maxine Hay, who had become a road safety campaigner after her son was killed after being hit by a car, with the Liberal Democrat candidate for the seat withdrawing in her favour.

== Election result ==
The Liberal Democrats made a net gain of 1 seat to move to 12 councillors at the expense of the Conservatives who remained in control of the council with 38 seats. The Liberal Democrats gained seats in Buckden and Huntingdon East from the Conservatives, but lost a seat back to them in St Neots Eaton Socon.

Huntingdonshire local election result 2008
Party	Seats	Gains	Losses	Net gain/loss	Seats %	Votes %	Votes	+/−
Conservative	13	1	2	-1	72.2	52.7	16,920	-5.2%
Liberal Democrats	4	2	1	+1	22.2	29.9	9,593	-1.5%
Independent	1	0	0	0	5.6	5.2	1,681	+5.2%
Labour	0	0	0	0	0	6.1	1,948	-2.0%
UKIP	0	0	0	0	0	5.6	1,796	+5.0%
Green	0	0	0	0	0	0.6	181	-0.4%

== Ward results ==
Brampton
Party	Candidate	Votes	%	±%
Liberal Democrats	Peter Downes	1,415	57.3	+6.5
Conservative	Keith Stukins	1,007	40.8	−5.3
Labour	Patrick Kadewere	49	2.0	−1.2
Majority		408	16.5	+11.8
Turnout		2,471	52.2	+0.5
Liberal Democrats hold		Swing		

Buckden
Party	Candidate	Votes	%	±%
Liberal Democrats	Terry Clough	795	59.4	+20.1
Conservative	Alan Barber	514	38.4	−18.4
Labour	Thelma Lomax	30	2.2	−1.7
Majority		281	21.0	N/A
Turnout		1,339	52.9	+1.1
Liberal Democrats gain from Conservative		Swing		

Godmanchester
Party	Candidate	Votes	%	±%
Conservative	Peter Godley	872	46.7	−3.8
Liberal Democrats	Graham Wilson	841	45.0	+2.2
UKIP	Shirley Reeve	79	4.2	+4.2
Labour	Ann Beevor	76	4.1	−2.5
Majority		31	1.7	−6.0
Turnout		1,868	40.9	−2.2
Conservative hold		Swing		

Huntingdon East
Party	Candidate	Votes	%	±%
Liberal Democrats	Michael Shellens	1,239	47.3	+9.6
Conservative	Malcolm Lyons	1,016	38.8	−10.3
Labour	Ruth Pugh	154	5.9	−2.0
UKIP	Derek Norman	145	5.5	+5.5
Green	Angela Mander-Jones	64	2.4	−2.8
Majority		223	8.5	N/A
Turnout		2,618	38.9	+2.8
Liberal Democrats gain from Conservative		Swing		

Huntingdon North
Party	Candidate	Votes	%	±%
Conservative	Jeff Dutton	473	47.2	+11.4
Liberal Democrats	John Morgan	300	29.9	−7.8
Labour	David King	147	14.7	−5.6
UKIP	Peter Ashcroft	83	8.3	+8.3
Majority		173	17.3	
Turnout		1,003	26.1	−1.2
Conservative hold		Swing		

Little Paxton
Party	Candidate	Votes	%	±%
Conservative	Kenneth Churchill	806	69.1	−0.9
Independent	Frank Owens	196	16.8	+16.8
Liberal Democrats	Alan Cummings	65	5.6	−17.9
Labour	Chrissy Ellarby	51	4.4	−2.1
Green	Sarah Boulton	49	4.2	+4.2
Majority		610	52.3	+5.8
Turnout		1,167	48.0	−0.8
Conservative hold		Swing		

Ramsey
Party	Candidate	Votes	%	±%
Conservative	Phillip Swales	957	46.2	−11.8
Liberal Democrats	Malcolm Hollis	564	27.2	−7.1
UKIP	Peter Reeve	452	21.8	+21.8
Labour	Susan Coomey	100	4.8	−2.9
Majority		393	19.0	−4.8
Turnout		2,073	32.5	+3.9
Conservative hold		Swing		

Sawtry
Party	Candidate	Votes	%	±%
Independent	Dick Tuplin	1,023	53.1	+1.6
Conservative	Vivienne McGuire	824	42.8	+7.9
Labour	Kevin Goddard	79	4.1	+0.3
Majority		199	10.3	−6.2
Turnout		1,926	38.8	+0.9
Independent hold		Swing		

Somersham
Party	Candidate	Votes	%	±%
Conservative	Steve Criswell	1,123	63.4	−2.6
Liberal Democrats	Tony Hulme	502	28.3	+0.3
UKIP	Julian Fairweather	80	4.5	+4.5
Labour	Mary Howell	66	3.7	−2.3
Majority		621	35.1	−3.0
Turnout		1,771	39.3	+1.3
Conservative hold		Swing		

St Ives East
Party	Candidate	Votes	%	±%
Conservative	Jason Ablewhite	864	55.2	−3.0
Liberal Democrats	Robin Waters	321	20.5	−9.7
UKIP	Michael Horwood	276	17.6	+17.6
Labour	Angela Richards	105	6.7	−4.9
Majority		543	34.7	+6.6
Turnout		1,566	31.3	+6.4
Conservative hold		Swing		

St Ives South
Party	Candidate	Votes	%	±%
Conservative	John Davies	1,231	65.8	+10.3
Liberal Democrats	David Hodge	483	25.8	−10.2
Labour	John Watson	156	8.3	−0.1
Majority		748	40.0	+20.5
Turnout		1,870	40.0	+4.5
Conservative hold		Swing		

St Ives West
Party	Candidate	Votes	%	±%
Conservative	Julie Dew	464	43.1	−7.2
Liberal Democrats	Colin Saunderson	381	35.4	−6.3
UKIP	Margaret King	168	15.6	+15.6
Labour	Ros Trayner	63	5.9	−2.1
Majority		83	7.7	−0.9
Turnout		1,076	49.0	+5.4
Conservative hold		Swing		

St Neots Eaton Ford
Party	Candidate	Votes	%	±%
Conservative	Bob Farrer	1,132	61.1	+5.1
Liberal Democrats	Keith Franks	562	30.3	−8.1
Labour	David Brown	92	5.0	−0.6
Green	Karen How	68	3.7	+3.7
Majority		570	30.7	+13.1
Turnout		1,854	34.8	−2.5
Conservative hold		Swing		

St Neots Eaton Socon
Party	Candidate	Votes	%	±%
Conservative	Mandy Thomas	911	57.5	+10.8
Liberal Democrats	Derek Giles	620	39.2	−8.3
Labour	Carole Hitchings	52	3.3	−2.5
Majority		291	18.4	N/A
Turnout		1,583	37.8	+3.9
Conservative gain from Liberal Democrats		Swing		

St Neots Eynesbury
Party	Candidate	Votes	%	±%
Conservative	Andrew Hansard	1,031	54.9	+13.7
Liberal Democrats	Diana Collins	666	35.4	−0.6
Labour	William O'Connor	182	9.7	+0.5
Majority		365	19.4	+14.2
Turnout		1,879	25.5	−4.5
Conservative hold		Swing		

The Hemingfords
Party	Candidate	Votes	%	±%
Conservative	Ian Bates	1,412	69.1	+3.3
Independent	Maxine Hay	462	22.6	+22.6
Labour	Jacqueline Gilbert	168	8.2	+2.9
Majority		950	46.5	+9.7
Turnout		2,042	43.8	−1.5
Conservative hold		Swing		

Warboys and Bury
Party	Candidate	Votes	%	±%
Liberal Democrats	Peter Ward	839	46.0	+9.2
Conservative	Jill Travener	787	43.2	−14.8
UKIP	Lisa Duffy	138	7.6	+7.6
Labour	Graeme Watkins	59	3.2	−2.0
Majority		52	2.8	
Turnout		1,823	38.7	+0.7
Liberal Democrats hold		Swing		

Yaxley and Farcet
Party	Candidate	Votes	%	±%
Conservative	John Watt	1,496	68.3	−6.6
UKIP	Robert Brown	375	17.1	+17.1
Labour	Margaret Cochrane	319	14.6	−10.5
Majority		1,121	51.2	+1.3
Turnout		2,190	28.5	+0.9
Conservative hold		Swing		

== By-elections between 2008 and 2010 ==
=== Ramsey April 2009 ===
A by-election was held in Ramsey on 2 April 2009 after the death of Conservative councillor Ross Muir. The seat was held for the Conservatives by Andy Monk with a majority of 106 votes over Peter Reeve of the UK Independence Party.

Ramsey by-election 2 April 2009
Party	Candidate	Votes	%	±%
Conservative	Andy Monk	626	38.1	−8.1
UKIP	Peter Reeve	520	31.6	+9.8
Liberal Democrats	Robert Mumford	432	26.3	−0.9
Labour	Graham Watkins	67	4.1	−0.7
Majority		106	6.4	−12.6
Turnout		1,645	25.8	−6.7
Conservative hold		Swing		

=== Ramsey July 2009 ===
A by-election was held in Ramsey on 23 July 2009 after the death of Liberal Democrat councillor Ray Powell. The seat was gained for the UK Independence Party by Peter Reeve with a majority of 184 votes over the Conservative Angela Curtis.

Ramsey by-election 23 July 2009
Party	Candidate	Votes	%	±%
UKIP	Peter Reeve	753	39.2	+7.6
Conservative	Angela Curtis	569	29.6	−8.5
Independent	Jeffrey Clarke	303	15.8	+15.8
Liberal Democrats	Melanie Allgood	295	15.4	−10.9
Majority		184	9.6	N/A
Turnout		1,920	30.1	+4.3
UKIP gain from Liberal Democrats		Swing		

=== Huntingdon North ===
A by-election was held in Huntingdon North on 29 October 2009 after Liberal Democrat councillor Sam Kemp resigned from the council. The seat was held for the Liberal Democrats by Trish Shrapnel with a majority of 30 votes over Conservative Laine Kadic, in a seat won by the Conservatives at the last council election in 2008.

Huntingdon North by-election 29 October 2009
Party	Candidate	Votes	%	±%
Liberal Democrats	Trish Shrapnel	243	32.6	+2.7
Conservative	Laine Kadic	213	28.6	−18.6
UKIP	Peter Ashcroft	167	22.4	+14.1
Labour	Ann Beevor	123	16.5	+1.8
Majority		30	4.0	
Turnout		746	19.0	−7.1
Liberal Democrats hold		Swing		

=== Fenstanton ===
A by-election was held in Fenstanton on 25 February 2010 after Conservative councillor Paul Dakers resigned from the council saying that all political parties were hopeless. The seat was gained by Liberal Democrat Colin Saunderson from the Conservatives, with a majority of 54 votes.

Fenstanton by-election 25 February 2010
Party	Candidate	Votes	%	±%
Liberal Democrats	Colin Saunderson	391	51.1	+4.2
Conservative	David O'Neill	337	44.1	−4.1
Labour	Angela Richards	37	4.8	−0.1
Majority		54	7.0	N/A
Turnout		765	31.0	−6.7
Liberal Democrats gain from Conservative		Swing		
