= 2015 Huntingdonshire District Council election =

2015 UK local government election

Map of the results

The 2015 Huntingdonshire District Council election took place on 7 May 2015 to elect members of Huntingdonshire District Council in England. This was on the same day as other local elections.

== Results summary ==
Huntingdonshire District Council election, 2015
Party	Seats	Gains	Losses	Net gain/loss	Seats %	Votes %	Votes	+/−
Conservative	39	1	1	Steady		53.2	29,585	+14.3
Liberal Democrats	5	0	0	Steady		8.4	4,689	-2.3
UKIP	4	0	1	▼1		18.4	10,207	-13.0
Independent	4	0	0	Steady		4.8	2,689	-0.6
Labour	2	1	0	▲1		14.2	7,878	+1.7
Green	0	0	0	Steady		0.8	466	-0.2

== Ward results ==
=== Brampton ===
Brampton 2015
Party	Candidate	Votes	%	±%
Liberal Democrats	John Paul Morris	1,031	56.2	
Conservative	Lin Sinclair	643	35.1	
Labour	Rob Gardiner	160	8.7	
Majority		388	21.1	−1.6
Liberal Democrats gain from				

=== Godmanchester ===
Godmanchester 2015
Party	Candidate	Votes	%	±%
Conservative	Keith Warren Sutkins	411	24	
Labour	Samuel Paul Sweek	253	15	
Liberal Democrats	David Richard Underwood	1055	61	
Majority				
		Swing		

=== Huntingdon East ===
Huntingdon East 2015
Party	Candidate	Votes	%	±%
Conservative	Tom Fletcher	610	25	
Labour	Marion Kadewere	294	12	
Liberal Democrats	Michael Frederick Shellens	1208	49	
UKIP	Jane Varghese	375	15	
Majority		598	5.1	
Liberal Democrats hold		Swing		

=== Huntingdon North ===
Huntingdon North 2015
Party	Candidate	Votes	%	±%
Conservative	Richards Valatka	171	17	−16
Independent	Alan James Mackender-Lawrence	115	11	0
Labour	Patrick Kadewere	433	43	+0.2
Liberal Democrats	Lakkana Rajiv Peiris Yalagala	48	5	−4
UKIP	Peter Henry Ashcroft	234	23	5.5
Majority		199	19	0.3
Labour hold		Swing	+0.3	

=== Little Paxton ===
Little Paxton
Party	Candidate	Votes	%	±%
Conservative	Laurence Swain	361	48.7	−27.6
Liberal Democrats	James Bartrick	231	24.7	+11.5
Green	Liz Timms	140	16.4	N/A
UKIP	Daniel Morris	121	13.0	N/A
Labour	Nicholas Janson Kumbula	81	15.0	+2.6
Majority				
Conservative hold		Swing		

=== Ramsey ===
Ramsey 2015
Party	Candidate	Votes	%	±%
Conservative	Ian James Curtis	300		
Labour	Kevin John Minnette	303		
UKIP	Lisa Ann Duffy	1,109		
Majority				
UKIP hold		Swing		

=== Sawtry ===
Sawtry 2015
Party	Candidate	Votes	%	±%
Conservative	Nikki Elliott			
Independent	Dick Tuplin			
Labour	Jonathan Hugh Orchard			
UKIP	Nicholas Vaughan Ashley			
Majority				
		Swing		

=== Somersham ===
Somersham 2015
Party	Candidate	Votes	%	±%
Conservative	Steve Criswell			
Labour	Iain Michael Ramsbottom			
UKIP	Shirley Joy Reeve			
Majority				
		Swing		

=== St Ives East ===
St Ives East 2015
Party	Candidate	Votes	%	±%
Conservative	Jason Ablewhite			
Labour	Angela Louise Richards			
Liberal Democrats	Colin Macrae Saunderson			
UKIP	Paul Bullen			
Majority				
		Swing		

=== St Ives South ===
St Ives South 2015
Party	Candidate	Votes	%	±%
Conservative	John Winston Davies			
Eccentric Party of Great Britain	Lord Toby Jug			
Labour	John Philip Watson			
UKIP	Lynne Alexandra Bullen			
Majority				
		Swing		

=== St Ives West ===
St Ives West 2015
Party	Candidate	Votes	%	±%
Conservative	Ryan Fuller			
Labour	Richard John Allen			
Liberal Democrats	David Frederick Hodge			
UKIP	Margaret Teresa King			
Majority				
		Swing		

=== St Neots Eaton Ford ===
St Neots Eaton Ford 2015
Party	Candidate	Votes	%	±%
Conservative	Graham John Welton			
Green	Melina Lafirenze			
Independent	Bob Farrer			
Independent	Sandie Giles			
Labour	Anna Elizabeth Hayward			
Majority				
		Swing		

=== St Neots Eaton Socon ===
St Neots Eaton Socon 2015
Party	Candidate	Votes	%	±%
Conservative	Keith Ivan Prentice			
Independent	Derek Arthur Giles			
Labour	Patricia Anne Nicholls			
Majority				
		Swing		

=== St Neots Eynesbury ===
St Neots Eynesbury 2015 (2 seats)
Party	Candidate	Votes	%	±%
Conservative	Robert Anthony Moores			
Conservative	Adrian Lee Usher			
Independent	Jim Corley			
Independent	Simone Leigh Taylor			
Labour	Doctor Nik Johnson			
Labour	Tony McNeill			
Majority				
		Swing		
		Swing		

=== The Hemingfords ===
The Hemingfords 2015
Party	Candidate	Votes	%	±%
Conservative	Alison Donaldson			
Labour	Robert Anthony Leach			
Liberal Democrats	David John Priestman			
UKIP	Philip Foster			
Majority				
		Swing		

=== Warboys and Bury ===
Warboys and Bury 2015
Party	Candidate	Votes	%	±%
Conservative	Jill Tavener	821	51%	4.7
UKIP	Mick Mean	402	25%	−1.2
Liberal Democrats	Tony Hulme	237	15%	3.2
Labour	Kevin Roy Goddard	165	10%	4.8
Majority		419	27%	6.9
Conservative hold		Swing	38	

=== Yaxley and Farcet ===
Yaxley and Farcet 2015
Party	Candidate	Votes	%	±%
Conservative				
UKIP				
Labour				
Majority				
		Swing		

== By-elections between 2015 and 2016 ==
=== Huntingdon East by-election ===
A by-election was held in Huntingdon East on 10 December 2015 after the resignation of UKIP councillor Andrew Hardy. The seat was gained for the Liberal Democrats by Ste Greenall.

Huntingdon East by-election 10 December 2015
Party	Candidate	Votes	%	±%
Liberal Democrats	Ste Greenall	844	45.0	+17.2
Conservative	Tom Fletcher	596	31.8	−3.3
UKIP	Martin Cohen	293	15.6	−7.8
Labour	Duncan Williams	141	7.5	−5.0
Majority		248	13.2	
Turnout		1,874		
Liberal Democrats gain from UKIP		Swing		
