= 2016 Huntingdonshire District Council election =

2016 UK local government election

Map of the results

The 2016 Huntingdonshire District Council election took place on 5 May 2016 to elect members of Huntingdonshire District Council in England. This was on the same day as other local elections.

== Results summary ==
Huntingdonshire District Council election, 2016
| Party | Seats | Gains | Losses | Net gain/loss | Seats % | Votes % | Votes | +/− |
|---|---|---|---|---|---|---|---|---|
| Conservative | 36 | 0 | 3 | ▼3 | | 38.7 | 11,741 | -14.6 |
| Liberal Democrats | 6 | 1 | 0 | ▲1 | | 14.8 | 4,493 | +6.4 |
| Independent | 6 | 2 | 0 | ▲2 | | 14.6 | 4,434 | +9.2 |
| UKIP | 4 | 0 | 0 | Steady | | 15.2 | 4,607 | -3.2 |
| Labour | 2 | 0 | 0 | Steady | | 15.7 | 4,755 | +1.5 |
| Green | 0 | 0 | 0 | Steady | | 0.6 | 196 | -0.2 |
| The Eccentric Party of Great Britain | 0 | 0 | 0 | Steady | | 0.3 | 89 | New |

== Ward results ==
=== Brampton ===
Brampton 2016
| Party | Candidate | Votes | % | ±% |
|---|---|---|---|---|
| Liberal Democrats | John Paul Morris | 1,031 | 56.2 | |
| Conservative | Lin Sinclair | 643 | 35.1 | |
| Labour | Rob Gardiner | 160 | 8.7 | |
| Majority | | 388 | 21.1 | −1.6 |
| Liberal Democrats hold | | Swing | | |

=== Godmanchester ===
Godmanchester 2016
| Party | Candidate | Votes | % | ±% |
|---|---|---|---|---|
| Conservative | Keith Warren Sutkins | 411 | 24 | |
| Labour | Samuel Paul Sweek | 253 | 15 | |
| Liberal Democrats | David Richard Underwood | 1,055 | 61 | |
| Majority | | | | |
| | | Swing | | |

=== Huntingdon East ===
Huntingdon East 2016
| Party | Candidate | Votes | % | ±% |
|---|---|---|---|---|
| Conservative | Tom Fletcher | 610 | 25 | |
| Labour | Marion Kadewere | 294 | 12 | |
| Liberal Democrats | Michael Frederick Shellens | 1,208 | 49 | |
| UKIP | Jane Varghese | 375 | 15 | |
| Majority | | 598 | 5.1 | |
| Liberal Democrats hold | | Swing | | |

=== Huntingdon North ===
Huntingdon North 2016
| Party | Candidate | Votes | % | ±% |
|---|---|---|---|---|
| Conservative | Richards Valatka | 171 | 17 | −16 |
| Independent | Alan James Mackender-Lawrence | 115 | 11 | 0 |
| Labour | Patrick Kadewere | 433 | 43 | +0.2 |
| Liberal Democrats | Lakkana Rajiv Peiris Yalagala | 48 | 5 | −4 |
| UKIP | Peter Henry Ashcroft | 234 | 23 | 5.5 |
| Majority | | 199 | 19 | 0.3 |
| Labour hold | | Swing | +0.3 | |

=== Little Paxton ===
Little Paxton
| Party | Candidate | Votes | % | ±% |
|---|---|---|---|---|
| Conservative | Laurence Swain | 361 | 48.7 | −27.6 |
| Liberal Democrats | James Bartrick | 231 | 24.7 | +11.5 |
| Green | Liz Timms | 140 | 16.4 | N/A |
| UKIP | Daniel Morris | 121 | 13.0 | N/A |
| Labour | Nicholas Janson Kumbula | 81 | 15.0 | +2.6 |
| Majority | | | | |
| Conservative hold | | Swing | | |

=== Ramsey ===
Ramsey 2016
| Party | Candidate | Votes | % | ±% |
|---|---|---|---|---|
| Conservative | Ian James Curtis | 300 | | |
| Labour | Kevin John Minnette | 303 | | |
| UKIP | Lisa Ann Duffy | 1,109 | | |
| Majority | | | | |
| UKIP hold | | Swing | | |

=== Sawtry ===
Sawtry 2016
| Party | Candidate | Votes | % | ±% |
|---|---|---|---|---|
| Conservative | Nikki Elliott | | | |
| Independent | Dick Tuplin | | | |
| Labour | Jonathan Hugh Orchard | | | |
| UKIP | Nicholas Vaughan Ashley | | | |
| Majority | | | | |
| | | Swing | | |

=== Somersham ===
Somersham 2016
| Party | Candidate | Votes | % | ±% |
|---|---|---|---|---|
| Conservative | Steve Criswell | | | |
| Labour | Iain Michael Ramsbottom | | | |
| UKIP | Shirley Joy Reeve | | | |
| Majority | | | | |
| | | Swing | | |

=== St Ives East ===
St Ives East 2016
| Party | Candidate | Votes | % | ±% |
|---|---|---|---|---|
| Conservative | Jason Ablewhite | | | |
| Labour | Angela Richards | | | |
| Liberal Democrats | Colin Saunderson | | | |
| UKIP | Paul Bullen | | | |
| Majority | | | | |
| | | Swing | | |

=== St Ives South ===
St Ives South 2016
| Party | Candidate | Votes | % | ±% |
|---|---|---|---|---|
| Conservative | John Winston Davies | | | |
| Eccentric Party of Great Britain | Lord Toby Jug | | | |
| Labour | John Philip Watson | | | |
| UKIP | Lynne Alexandra Bullen | | | |
| Majority | | | | |
| | | Swing | | |

=== St Ives West ===
St Ives West 2016
| Party | Candidate | Votes | % | ±% |
|---|---|---|---|---|
| Conservative | Ryan Fuller | | | |
| Labour | Richard John Allen | | | |
| Liberal Democrats | David Frederick Hodge | | | |
| UKIP | Margaret Teresa King | | | |
| Majority | | | | |
| | | Swing | | |

=== St Neots Eaton Ford ===
St Neots Eaton Ford 2016
| Party | Candidate | Votes | % | ±% |
|---|---|---|---|---|
| Conservative | Graham John Welton | | | |
| Green | Melina Lafirenze | | | |
| Independent | Bob Farrer | | | |
| Independent | Sandie Giles | | | |
| Labour | Anna Elizabeth Hayward | | | |
| Majority | | | | |
| | | Swing | | |

=== St Neots Eaton Socon ===
St Neots Eaton Socon 2016
| Party | Candidate | Votes | % | ±% |
|---|---|---|---|---|
| Conservative | Keith Ivan Prentice | | | |
| Independent | Derek Arthur Giles | | | |
| Labour | Patricia Anne Nicholls | | | |
| Majority | | | | |
| | | Swing | | |

=== St Neots Eynesbury ===
St Neots Eynesbury 2016 (2 seats)
| Party | Candidate | Votes | % | ±% |
|---|---|---|---|---|
| Conservative | Robert Anthony Moores | | | |
| Conservative | Adrian Lee Usher | | | |
| Independent | Jim Corley | | | |
| Independent | Simone Leigh Taylor | | | |
| Labour | Doctor Nik Johnson | | | |
| Labour | Tony McNeill | | | |
| Majority | | | | |
| | | Swing | | |
| | | Swing | | |

=== The Hemingfords ===
The Hemingfords 2016
| Party | Candidate | Votes | % | ±% |
|---|---|---|---|---|
| Conservative | Alison Donaldson | | | |
| Labour | Robert Anthony Leach | | | |
| Liberal Democrats | David John Priestman | | | |
| UKIP | Philip Foster | | | |
| Majority | | | | |
| | | Swing | | |

=== Warboys and Bury ===
Warboys and Bury 2016
| Party | Candidate | Votes | % | ±% |
|---|---|---|---|---|
| Conservative | Jill Tavener | 821 | 51% | 4.7 |
| UKIP | Mick Mean | 402 | 25% | −1.2 |
| Liberal Democrats | Tony Hulme | 237 | 15% | 3.2 |
| Labour | Kevin Roy Goddard | 165 | 10% | 4.8 |
| Majority | | 419 | 27% | 6.9 |
| Conservative hold | | Swing | 38 | |

=== Yaxley and Farcet ===
Yaxley and Farcet 2016
| Party | Candidate | Votes | % | ±% |
|---|---|---|---|---|
| Conservative | Des Watt | 1,130 | 50% | 3.2 |
| UKIP | Colin Moody | 568 | 25% | 0.4 |
| Labour | Graeme Leslie Watkins | 553 | 25% | 2.2 |
| Majority | | 562 | 24.9% | 4.9 |
| Conservative hold | | Swing | 37.5% | |

== By-elections between 2016 and 2018 ==
=== St Neots Eaton Ford by-election ===
A by-election was held in St Neots Eaton Ford on 4 May 2017 after the resignation of Conservative councillor David Harty. The seat was gained for the St. Neots Independent Group by Charles Bober.

St Neots Eaton Ford by-election 4 May 2017
| Party | Candidate | Votes | % | ±% |
|---|---|---|---|---|
| St. Neots Ind. | Charles Bober | 854 | 42.8 | +42.8 |
| Conservative | Keith Prentice | 788 | 39.5 | +11.8 |
| Liberal Democrats | Michael Walker | 353 | 17.7 | +17.7 |
| Majority | | 66 | 3.3 | |
| Turnout | | 1,995 | | |
| St. Neots Ind. gain from Conservative | | Swing | | |
