= 2007 Huntingdonshire District Council election =

English District Council Election

Map of the results of the 2007 Huntingdonshire District Council election. Conservatives in blue and Liberal Democrats in yellow. Wards in dark grey were not contested in 2007.

The 2007 Huntingdonshire District Council election took place on 3 May 2007 to elect members of Huntingdonshire District Council in Cambridgeshire, England. One third of the council was up for election and the Conservative Party stayed in overall control of the council.

After the election, the composition of the council was:

- Conservative 39
- Liberal Democrats 11
- Independent 2

== Background ==
19 seats on the council were contested at the election, with the Conservatives controlling the council before the election with 40 of the 52 seats. A number of sitting councillors stood down at the election including Conservatives Jean Chandler (Fenstanton ward) and Nick Guyatt, and Liberal Democrat Shirley Menczer (Brampton ward).

As well as candidates from the Conservative, Liberal Democrat and Labour parties, there were also Green Party candidates in the 3 Huntingdon wards, a British National Party candidate in St Neots Eynesbury and a UK Independence Party candidate in Upwood and The Raveleys. Meanwhile, the only councillor to have served since the council was founded in 1974, Conservative Mike Newman, stood again in Somersham ward.

== Election result ==
The Conservatives suffered a net loss of 1 seat, after losing 2 seats to the Liberal Democrats, but also gaining 1 seat. This meant the Conservatives stayed in control of the council with 39 councillors, compared to 11 for the Liberal Democrats and 2 independents. One of the 2 Liberal Democrat gains came in Huntingdon North, where 19-year-old Sam Kemp took the seat by 19 votes from Conservative Maggie Wheeler.

Huntingdonshire local election result 2007
Party	Seats	Gains	Losses	Net gain/loss	Seats %	Votes %	Votes	+/−
Conservative	14	1	2	-1	73.7	57.9	16,894	+2.4%
Liberal Democrats	5	2	1	+1	26.3	31.4	9,168	-1.2%
Labour	0	0	0	0	0	8.1	2,347	-0.4%
BNP	0	0	0	0	0	1.0	299	+1.0%
Green	0	0	0	0	0	1.0	280	+1.0%
UKIP	0	0	0	0	0	0.6	166	+0.6%

== Ward results ==
Brampton
Party	Candidate	Votes	%	±%
Liberal Democrats	Patricia Jordan	1,237	50.8	
Conservative	Jane King	1,123	46.1	
Labour	Sybil Tuckwood	77	3.2	
Majority		114	4.7	
Turnout		2,437	51.7	−4.4
Liberal Democrats hold		Swing		

Earith
Party	Candidate	Votes	%	±%
Conservative	Philip Godfrey	1,157	71.7	+3.1
Liberal Democrats	Leona Graham-Elen	361	22.4	−2.3
Labour	Cindy Cochrane	95	5.9	−0.9
Majority		796	49.3	+5.4
Turnout		1,613	34.9	+0.5
Conservative hold		Swing		

Ellington
Party	Candidate	Votes	%	±%
Liberal Democrats	Michael Baker	747	57.1	−2.3
Conservative	Stephen Cawley	561	42.9	+6.3
Majority		186	14.2	−8.5
Turnout		1,308	57.9	+4.4
Liberal Democrats hold		Swing		

Elton and Folksworth
Party	Candidate	Votes	%	±%
Conservative	Mac McGuire	690	83.4	+10.6
Labour	Mary Howell	137	16.6	+8.6
Majority		553	66.9	+13.3
Turnout		827	39.9	−2.1
Conservative hold		Swing		

Fenstanton
Party	Candidate	Votes	%	±%
Conservative	Paul Dakers	442	48.2	−2.1
Liberal Democrats	Colin Saunderson	430	46.9	+3.2
Labour	Angela Richards	45	4.9	−1.1
Majority		12	1.3	−5.2
Turnout		917	37.7	−2.9
Conservative hold		Swing		

Gransden and The Offords
Party	Candidate	Votes	%	±%
Conservative	Barbara Boddington	1,106	75.7	+3.5
Liberal Democrats	Julia Hayward	355	24.3	+2.9
Majority		751	51.4	+0.5
Turnout		1,461	41.1	−0.5
Conservative hold		Swing		

Huntingdon East
Party	Candidate	Votes	%	±%
Conservative	Mike Simpson	1,173	49.1	+8.5
Liberal Democrats	Peter Fleming	901	37.7	−12.4
Labour	David King	188	7.9	−1.4
Green	Tony Staples	125	5.2	+5.2
Majority		272	11.4	
Turnout		2,387	36.1	−3.7
Conservative hold		Swing		

Huntingdon North
Party	Candidate	Votes	%	±%
Liberal Democrats	Sam Kemp	376	37.7	
Conservative	Maggie Wheeler	357	35.8	
Labour	Ann Beevor	202	20.3	
Green	John Clare	62	6.2	
Majority		19	1.9	
Turnout		997	27.3	−0.9
Liberal Democrats gain from Conservative		Swing		

Huntingdon West
Party	Candidate	Votes	%	±%
Conservative	Tom Sanderson	974	70.2	+6.8
Liberal Democrats	Michael Burrell	209	15.1	−11.4
Labour	David Brown	112	8.1	−2.0
Green	Karen How	93	6.7	+6.7
Majority		765	55.1	+18.3
Turnout		1,388	32.2	+0.1
Conservative hold		Swing		

Kimbolton and Staughton
Party	Candidate	Votes	%	±%
Conservative	Jonathan Gray	985	73.8	+11.2
Liberal Democrats	Roy Benford	314	23.5	+8.4
Labour	Patrick Kadewere	36	2.7	−3.9
Majority		671	50.3	+3.4
Turnout		1,335	54.0	+1.7
Conservative hold		Swing		

Ramsey
Party	Candidate	Votes	%	±%
Conservative	Ross Muir	1,050	58.0	+8.4
Liberal Democrats	Janet Dutton	620	34.3	−16.1
Labour	Susan Coomey	140	7.7	+7.7
Majority		430	23.7	
Turnout		1,810	28.6	−4.3
Conservative hold		Swing		

Somersham
Party	Candidate	Votes	%	±%
Conservative	Michael Newman	1,140	66.0	
Liberal Democrats	Tony Hulme	483	28.0	
Labour	Karen Webb	103	6.0	
Majority		657	38.0	
Turnout		1,726	38.0	−8.6
Conservative hold		Swing		

St Neots Eaton Ford
Party	Candidate	Votes	%	±%
Conservative	David Harty	1,102	56.0	
Liberal Democrats	Martin Land	755	38.4	
Labour	John Watson	110	5.6	
Majority		347	17.6	
Turnout		1,967	37.3	−4.5
Conservative hold		Swing		

St Neots Eaton Socon
Party	Candidate	Votes	%	±%
Liberal Democrats	Gordon Thorpe	671	47.5	
Conservative	Mandy Thomas	659	46.7	
Labour	Graham Hitchings	82	5.8	
Majority		12	0.8	
Turnout		1,412	33.9	+0.6
Liberal Democrats hold		Swing		

St Neots Eynesbury
Party	Candidate	Votes	%	±%
Conservative	Paul Ursell	905	41.2	−7.7
Liberal Democrats	Diana Collins	791	36.0	−4.6
BNP	Nicholas Smith	299	13.6	+13.6
Labour	Bill O'Connor	201	9.2	−1.3
Majority		114	5.2	−3.1
Turnout		2,196	30.0	+1.4
Conservative gain from Liberal Democrats		Swing		

St Neots Priory Park
Party	Candidate	Votes	%	±%
Liberal Democrats	Kendal Cooper	742	47.4	−6.5
Conservative	Paula Longford	726	46.4	+8.0
Labour	Richard Allen	96	6.1	−1.6
Majority		16	1.0	−14.6
Turnout		1,564	35.1	−0.5
Liberal Democrats gain from Conservative		Swing		

Stilton
Party	Candidate	Votes	%	±%
Conservative	Peter Mitchell	743	81.3	+17.4
Labour	Margaret Cochrane	171	18.7	+9.6
Majority		572	62.6	+25.7
Turnout		914	39.9	−6.6
Conservative hold		Swing		

Upwood and The Raveleys
Party	Candidate	Votes	%	±%
Conservative	Terry Bell	453	54.6	+5.9
Liberal Democrats	Patricia Worgan	176	21.2	−24.2
UKIP	Robert Brown	166	20.0	+20.0
Labour	Graeme Watkins	34	4.1	−1.8
Majority		277	33.4	+30.1
Turnout		829	33.2	−7.0
Conservative hold		Swing		

Yaxley and Farcet
Party	Candidate	Votes	%	±%
Conservative	Eric Butler	1,548	74.9	+7.4
Labour	Kevin Goddard	518	25.1	−7.4
Majority		1,030	49.9	+14.9
Turnout		2,066	27.6	+0.3
Conservative hold		Swing		
