= 1998 Huntingdonshire District Council election =

1998 UK local government election

The 1998 Huntingdonshire District Council election took place on 7 May 1998 to elect members of Huntingdonshire District Council in Cambridgeshire, England. One third of the council was up for election and the Conservative Party stayed in overall control of the council.

After the election, the composition of the council was:

- Conservative 34
- Liberal Democrats 14
- Labour 3
- Independent 2

== Election result ==
Huntingdonshire local election result 1998
Party	Seats	Gains	Losses	Net gain/loss	Seats %	Votes %	Votes	+/−
Conservative	12	3	2	+1	66.7	51.4	10,726	
Liberal Democrats	5	2	1	+1	27.8	28.9	6,028	
Independent	1	0	0	0	5.6	3.3	688	
Labour	0	0	2	-2	0	16.4	3,426	

== Ward results ==
Brampton
Party	Candidate	Votes	%	±%
Liberal Democrats	Elionor McNeill	907	51.8	
Conservative	Janet Bennion	802	45.8	
Labour	Sandra Wilcox	42	2.4	
Majority		105	6.0	
Turnout		1,751	50.8	
Liberal Democrats gain from Conservative		Swing		

Buckden
Party	Candidate	Votes	%	±%
Liberal Democrats	William Clough	774	66.0	
Conservative	William Sinclair	368	31.4	
Labour	Reginald Wilcox	30	2.6	
Majority		406	34.6	
Turnout		1,172	58.0	
Liberal Democrats hold		Swing		

Bury
Party	Candidate	Votes	%	±%
Conservative	John Rignall	556	70.4	
Liberal Democrats	Carole Crompton	164	20.8	
Labour	Lesley Shipgood	70	8.9	
Majority		392	49.6	
Turnout		790	48.9	
Conservative hold		Swing		

Elton
Party	Candidate	Votes	%	±%
Conservative	Nicholas Guyatt	324	69.8	
Labour	Raymond Atkins	95	20.5	
Liberal Democrats	Virginia Bowley	45	9.7	
Majority		229	49.4	
Turnout		464	34.6	
Conservative hold		Swing		

Farcet
Party	Candidate	Votes	%	±%
Conservative	David Burgess	260	53.7	
Labour	Kevin Goddard	207	42.8	
Liberal Democrats	Carol Hagger	17	3.5	
Majority		53	11.0	
Turnout		484	37.2	
Conservative hold		Swing		

Godmanchester
Party	Candidate	Votes	%	±%
Conservative	Keith Gabb	540	45.7	
Liberal Democrats	Charles Looker	495	41.9	
Labour	Rosemary Eaton	147	12.4	
Majority		45	3.8	
Turnout		1,182	27.9	
Conservative gain from Liberal Democrats		Swing		

Hemingford Grey
Party	Candidate	Votes	%	±%
Conservative	Michael Day	529	69.7	
Labour	Grace Adams	168	22.1	
Liberal Democrats	Mark Rainer	62	8.2	
Majority		361	47.6	
Turnout		759	38.9	
Conservative hold		Swing		

Houghton and Wyton
Party	Candidate	Votes	%	±%
Conservative	Roger Rhodes	424	67.3	
Liberal Democrats	David Hunter	142	22.5	
Labour	Gail Findlay	64	10.2	
Majority		282	44.8	
Turnout		630	34.0	
Conservative hold		Swing		

Huntingdon North
Party	Candidate	Votes	%	±%
Conservative	Martin Stephenson	1,163	64.4	
Labour	Valerie Brooker	642	35.6	
Majority		521	28.9	
Turnout		1,805	27.0	
Conservative hold		Swing		

Huntingdon West
Party	Candidate	Votes	%	±%
Conservative	John Sadler	823	49.3	
Labour	George Beevor	700	41.9	
Liberal Democrats	Richard Wyatt	146	8.7	
Majority		123	7.4	
Turnout		1,669	25.0	
Conservative gain from Labour		Swing		

Ramsey
Party	Candidate	Votes	%	±%
Conservative	Ian Muir	816	64.3	
Labour	Keith Bennett	241	19.0	
Liberal Democrats	Malcolm Wheatley	213	16.8	
Majority		575	45.3	
Turnout		1,270	22.6	
Conservative hold		Swing		

Sawtry
Party	Candidate	Votes	%	±%
Independent	Richard Tuplin	688	48.1	
Conservative	Alan Morris	522	36.5	
Labour	Kevin Hawkins	127	8.9	
Liberal Democrats	John Rimington	94	6.6	
Majority		166	11.6	
Turnout		1,431	32.5	
Independent hold		Swing		

St. Ives North
Party	Candidate	Votes	%	±%
Conservative	Jean Chandler	877	64.3	
Liberal Democrats	Glen Clarke	264	19.4	
Labour	David Brown	223	16.3	
Majority		613	44.9	
Turnout		1,364	20.5	
Conservative hold		Swing		

St. Neots Eynesbury
Party	Candidate	Votes	%	±%
Conservative	Debbie Lewsey	558	50.5	
Labour	Ian Webb	315	28.5	
Liberal Democrats	Dave Priedy	232	21.0	
Majority		243	22.0	
Turnout		1,105	18.6	
Conservative gain from Labour		Swing		

St. Neots Priory Park
Party	Candidate	Votes	%	±%
Liberal Democrats	Sally Guinee	660	51.8	
Conservative	Ronald Dean	469	36.8	
Labour	Patricia Nicholls	146	11.5	
Majority		191	15.0	
Turnout		1,275	32.9	
Liberal Democrats hold		Swing		

The Offords
Party	Candidate	Votes	%	±%
Liberal Democrats	Keith Edgley	540	48.3	
Conservative	Lawrence Simpson	504	45.1	
Labour	Janet Boston	73	6.5	
Majority		36	3.2	
Turnout		1,117	54.8	
Liberal Democrats hold		Swing		

The Stukeleys
Party	Candidate	Votes	%	±%
Conservative	Richard Turpin	683	58.6	
Liberal Democrats	Caroline Pencak	400	34.3	
Labour	Daniel McCracken	83	7.1	
Majority		283	24.3	
Turnout		1,166	46.8	
Conservative hold		Swing		

Warboys
Party	Candidate	Votes	%	±%
Liberal Democrats	Jack Taylor	873	60.9	
Conservative	Iain Gourlay	508	35.4	
Labour	Graeme Watkins	53	3.7	
Majority		365	25.5	
Turnout		1,434	41.9	
Liberal Democrats gain from Conservative		Swing		

== By-elections between 1998 and 1999 ==
Gransden by-election 10 December 1998
Party	Candidate	Votes	%	±%
Conservative		379	81.3	+27.1
Liberal Democrats		87	18.7	−27.1
Majority		292	62.7	+54.2
Turnout		466	22.9	−19.3
Conservative hold		Swing		
