= 2002 Huntingdonshire District Council election =

2002 UK local government election

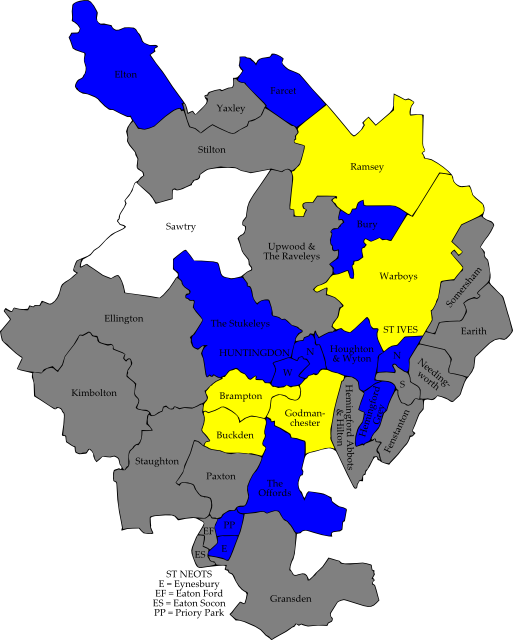
Map of the results of the 2002 Huntingdonshire District Council election. Conservatives in blue, Liberal Democrats in yellow and independents in white. Wards in grey were not contested in 2002.

The 2002 Huntingdonshire District Council election took place on 4 May 2002 to elect members of Huntingdonshire District Council in Cambridgeshire, England. One third of the council was up for election and the Conservative Party stayed in overall control of the council.

After the election, the composition of the council was:

- Conservative 37
- Liberal Democrats 13
- Independent 3

== Election result ==
Huntingdonshire local election result 2002
Party	Seats	Gains	Losses	Net gain/loss	Seats %	Votes %	Votes	+/−
Conservative	12	2	2	0	66.7	46.1	10,967	-9.6%
Liberal Democrats	5	2	2	0	27.8	37.5	8,922	+9.9%
Independent	1	0	0	0	5.6	4.6	1,105	+1.3%
Labour	0	0	0	0	0	11.7	2,777	-0.9%

== Ward results ==
Brampton
Party	Candidate	Votes	%	±%
Liberal Democrats	Shirley Menczer	1,098	60.1	+9.2
Conservative	Elaine Sefton	670	36.7	−8.4
Labour	Graham Hitchings	58	3.2	+1.3
Majority		428	23.4	+17.6
Turnout		1,826	49.5	−4.6
Liberal Democrats hold		Swing		

Buckden
Party	Candidate	Votes	%	±%
Liberal Democrats	William Clough	729	70.8	+4.8
Conservative	John Lancaster	270	26.2	−5.2
Labour	David Brown	30	2.9	+0.3
Majority		459	44.6	+10.0
Turnout		1,029	50.2	−7.8
Liberal Democrats hold		Swing		

Bury
Party	Candidate	Votes	%	±%
Conservative	John Rignall	570	77.6	+7.2
Liberal Democrats	Janet Dutton	99	13.5	−7.3
Labour	Maria Baker	66	9.0	+0.1
Majority		471	64.1	+14.5
Turnout		735	44.9	−4.0
Conservative hold		Swing		

Elton
Party	Candidate	Votes	%	±%
Conservative	Nicholas Guyatt	392	66.7	−3.1
Independent	John Davidson	99	16.8	+16.8
Labour	Kevin Goddard	97	16.5	−4.0
Majority		293	49.8	+0.4
Turnout		588	42.2	+7.6
Conservative hold		Swing		

Farcet
Party	Candidate	Votes	%	±%
Conservative	Eric Butler	253	53.7	+0.0
Labour	Graeme Watkins	218	46.3	+3.5
Majority		35	7.4	−3.6
Turnout		471	35.1	−2.1
Conservative hold		Swing		

Godmanchester
Party	Candidate	Votes	%	±%
Liberal Democrats	Charles Looker	986	58.3	+8.9
Conservative	Keith Gabb	614	36.3	−7.1
Labour	Sandra Wilcox	92	5.4	−1.8
Majority		372	22.0	+16.0
Turnout		1,692	37.5	+2.1
Liberal Democrats gain from Conservative		Swing		

Hemingford Grey
Party	Candidate	Votes	%	±%
Conservative	Michael Day	514	60.5	−9.2
Liberal Democrats	Gilly Jackson	203	23.9	+15.7
Labour	Michael Sneath	132	15.5	−6.6
Majority		311	36.6	−11.0
Turnout		849	41.0	+2.1
Conservative hold		Swing		

Houghton and Wyton
Party	Candidate	Votes	%	±%
Conservative	Roger Rhodes	401	48.4	−18.9
Liberal Democrats	David Hunter	389	47.0	+24.5
Labour	John Watson	38	4.6	−5.6
Majority		12	1.4	−43.4
Turnout		828	41.1	+7.1
Conservative hold		Swing		

Huntingdon North
Party	Candidate	Votes	%	±%
Conservative	Deborah Sharp	961	54.5	−12.3
Labour	Ann Beevor	485	27.5	−5.7
Liberal Democrats	Justin Meadows	317	18.0	+18.0
Majority		476	27.0	−6.6
Turnout		1,763	24.7	−2.0
Conservative hold		Swing		

Huntingdon West
Party	Candidate	Votes	%	±%
Conservative	John Sadler	791	48.6	−6.8
Labour	Ruth Pugh	486	29.9	+2.3
Liberal Democrats	Michael Shellens	349	21.5	+9.1
Majority		305	18.8	−8.9
Turnout		1,626	22.2	−1.3
Conservative hold		Swing		

Ramsey
Party	Candidate	Votes	%	±%
Liberal Democrats	Raymond Powell	859	50.3	+8.5
Conservative	Ian Muir	850	49.7	−1.8
Majority		9	0.6	
Turnout		1,709	28.6	+3.1
Liberal Democrats gain from Conservative		Swing		

Sawtry
Party	Candidate	Votes	%	±%
Independent	Richard Tuplin	1,006	64.2	+12.5
Conservative	David Bowens	479	30.6	−10.3
Labour	Susan Coomey	82	5.2	−2.2
Majority		527	33.6	+22.8
Turnout		1,567	34.1	+0.6
Independent hold		Swing		

St. Ives North
Party	Candidate	Votes	%	±%
Conservative	Jean Chandler	808	39.4	−23.0
Liberal Democrats	Deborah Townsend	800	39.0	+15.0
Labour	Robert Haynes	443	21.6	+11.2
Majority		8	0.4	−38.0
Turnout		2,051	30.1	+4.6
Conservative hold		Swing		

St. Neots Eynesbury
Party	Candidate	Votes	%	±%
Conservative	Andrew Hansard	731	44.6	−3.6
Liberal Democrats	Ian Taylor	661	40.3	+6.0
Labour	William O'Connor	248	15.1	−2.4
Majority		70	4.3	−9.6
Turnout		1,640	26.5	+5.1
Conservative hold		Swing		

St. Neots Priory Park
Party	Candidate	Votes	%	±%
Conservative	Andrew Barnes	804	51.7	+15.8
Liberal Democrats	Michael Pope	651	41.9	−11.0
Labour	Patricia Nicholls	99	6.4	−4.7
Majority		153	9.8	
Turnout		1,554	37.3	+5.5
Conservative gain from Liberal Democrats		Swing		

The Offords
Party	Candidate	Votes	%	±%
Conservative	Nichola Elliott	496	52.9	+7.8
Liberal Democrats	John Grosvenor	383	40.8	−7.5
Labour	Janet Boston	59	6.3	−0.2
Majority		113	12.1	
Turnout		938	44.4	−10.4
Conservative gain from Liberal Democrats		Swing		

The Stukeleys
Party	Candidate	Votes	%	±%
Conservative	Sarah Vanbergen	846	52.6	−6.0
Liberal Democrats	Vivienne Dyer	678	42.2	+7.9
Labour	Valerie Brooker	83	5.2	−1.9
Majority		168	10.5	−13.8
Turnout		1,607	54.5	+7.7
Conservative hold		Swing		

Warboys
Party	Candidate	Votes	%	±%
Liberal Democrats	Jack Taylor	720	55.5	+21.7
Conservative	Pamela Thornton	517	39.8	−22.8
Labour	Carol Osborne	61	4.7	+1.1
Majority		203	15.7	
Turnout		1,298	34.2	−0.8
Liberal Democrats hold		Swing		

== By-elections between 2002 and 2003 ==
Hemingford Grey by-election 19 September 2002
Party	Candidate	Votes	%	±%
Liberal Democrats		553	52.9	+29.0
Conservative		493	47.1	−13.4
Majority		60	5.8	
Turnout		1,046	50.3	+9.3
Liberal Democrats gain from Conservative		Swing		
