= 2006 Huntingdonshire District Council election =

2006 UK local government election

Map of the results of the 2006 Huntingdonshire District Council election. Conservatives in blue, Liberal Democrats in yellow and independents in light grey. Wards in dark grey were not contested in 2006.

The 2006 Huntingdonshire District Council election took place on 4 May 2006 to elect members of Huntingdonshire District Council in Cambridgeshire, England. One third of the council was up for election and the Conservative Party stayed in overall control of the council.

After the election, the composition of the council was:

- Conservative 40
- Liberal Democrats 10
- Independent 2

== Election result ==
The Liberal Democrat gain in Huntingdon East by David Priestman was the first time the party had won a seat in the town of Huntingdon on the council.

Huntingdonshire local election result 2006
Party	Seats	Gains	Losses	Net gain/loss	Seats %	Votes %	Votes	+/−
Conservative	13	2	2	0	76.5	55.5	15,962	+2.3%
Liberal Democrats	3	2	2	0	17.6	32.6	9,382	-0.7%
Independent	1	0	0	0	5.9	3.4	978	+0.2%
Labour	0	0	0	0	0	8.5	2,450	-0.4%

== Ward results ==
Alconbury and The Stukeleys
Party	Candidate	Votes	%	±%
Conservative	Keith Baker	820	68.3	+4.3
Liberal Democrats	Ann Monk	315	26.3	+8.4
Labour	David Brown	65	5.4	−0.2
Majority		505	42.1	−4.0
Turnout		1,200	48.5	−2.7
Conservative hold		Swing		

Buckden
Party	Candidate	Votes	%	±%
Conservative	Richard Bailey	745	56.8	+11.7
Liberal Democrats	Mark Rainer	516	39.3	−12.3
Labour	Deidre Lee	51	3.9	+0.6
Majority		229	17.5	
Turnout		1,312	51.8	−6.8
Conservative gain from Liberal Democrats		Swing		

Earith
Party	Candidate	Votes	%	±%
Conservative	Terence Rogers	1,082	68.6	
Liberal Democrats	Leona Graham-Elen	389	24.7	
Labour	Susan Coomey	107	6.8	
Majority		693	43.9	
Turnout		1,578	34.4	−4.6
Conservative hold		Swing		

Elton and Folksworth
Party	Candidate	Votes	%	±%
Conservative	Nicholas Guyatt	640	72.8	+6.1
Liberal Democrats	John Davidson	169	19.2	+1.0
Labour	Margaret Cochrane	70	8.0	−7.0
Majority		471	53.6	+5.1
Turnout		879	42.0	−4.7
Conservative hold		Swing		

Godmanchester
Party	Candidate	Votes	%	±%
Conservative	Colin Hyams	984	50.5	
Liberal Democrats	Graham Wilson	834	42.8	
Labour	William Hennessy	129	6.6	
Majority		150	7.7	
Turnout		1,947	43.1	−0.8
Conservative hold		Swing		

Gransden and The Offords
Party	Candidate	Votes	%	±%
Conservative	Richard West	1,048	72.2	
Liberal Democrats	Julia Hayward	310	21.4	
Labour	David Nicholls	93	6.4	
Majority		738	50.8	
Turnout		1,451	41.6	−7.6
Conservative hold		Swing		

Huntingdon East
Party	Candidate	Votes	%	±%
Liberal Democrats	David Priestman	1,326	50.1	
Conservative	Susan Mulcahy	1,073	40.6	
Labour	David King	247	9.3	
Majority		253	9.5	
Turnout		2,646	39.8	−0.9
Liberal Democrats gain from Conservative		Swing		

Huntingdon West
Party	Candidate	Votes	%	±%
Conservative	John Sadler	872	63.4	
Liberal Democrats	Michael Burrell	365	26.5	
Labour	Ann Beevor	139	10.1	
Majority		507	36.9	
Turnout		1,376	32.1	−6.8
Conservative hold		Swing		

Ramsey
Party	Candidate	Votes	%	±%
Liberal Democrats	Raymond Powell	1,042	50.4	
Conservative	David Wallwork	1,026	49.6	
Majority		16	0.8	
Turnout		2,068	32.9	−4.1
Liberal Democrats hold		Swing		

Sawtry
Party	Candidate	Votes	%	±%
Independent	John Garner	978	51.5	
Conservative	Iris Weatherley	664	34.9	
Liberal Democrats	John Souter	186	9.8	
Labour	Marie Baker	72	3.8	
Majority		314	16.6	
Turnout		1,900	37.9	−5.1
Independent hold		Swing		

St Ives East
Party	Candidate	Votes	%	±%
Conservative	Deborah Reynolds	722	58.2	
Liberal Democrats	Robin Waters	374	30.2	
Labour	Angela Richards	144	11.6	
Majority		348	28.0	
Turnout		1,240	24.9	−10.0
Conservative hold		Swing		

St Ives South
Party	Candidate	Votes	%	±%
Conservative	Douglas Dew	934	55.5	
Liberal Democrats	David Hodge	606	36.0	
Labour	Richard Allen	142	8.4	
Majority		328	19.5	
Turnout		1,682	35.4	−4.5
Conservative hold		Swing		

St Neots Eynesbury
Party	Candidate	Votes	%	±%
Conservative	Andrew Gilbert	1,012	48.9	
Liberal Democrats	Ian Taylor	840	40.6	
Labour	William O'Connor	217	10.5	
Majority		172	8.3	
Turnout		2,069	28.6	−1.5
Conservative gain from Liberal Democrats		Swing		

St Neots Priory Park
Party	Candidate	Votes	%	±%
Liberal Democrats	Robert Eaton	870	53.9	
Conservative	Paul Ursell	619	38.4	
Labour	Patricia Nicholls	124	7.7	
Majority		251	15.5	
Turnout		1,613	35.6	−1.6
Liberal Democrats gain from Conservative		Swing		

The Hemingfords
Party	Candidate	Votes	%	±%
Conservative	Christopher Stephens	1,356	65.8	
Liberal Democrats	Jennifer Sefton	597	29.0	
Labour	John Watson	109	5.3	
Majority		759	36.8	
Turnout		2,062	45.3	−10.1
Conservative hold		Swing		

Warboys and Bury
Party	Candidate	Votes	%	±%
Conservative	Peter Bucknell	1,012	58.0	
Liberal Democrats	Terry Palmer	643	36.8	
Labour	Mary Howell	90	5.2	
Majority		369	21.2	
Turnout		1,745	38.0	−9.3
Conservative hold		Swing		

Yaxley and Farcet
Party	Candidate	Votes	%	±%
Conservative	Madhabi Banerjee	1,353	67.5	
Labour	Graeme Watkins	651	32.5	
Majority		702	35.0	
Turnout		2,004	27.3	−5.2
Conservative hold		Swing		

== By-elections between 2006 and 2007 ==
=== Earith ===
Earith by-election 12 October 2006
Party	Candidate	Votes	%	±%
Conservative		703	67.4	−1.2
Liberal Democrats		295	28.3	+3.6
Labour		45	4.3	−2.5
Majority		408	39.1	−4.8
Turnout		1,043	22.6	−11.8
Conservative hold		Swing		

=== St Neots Eaton Ford ===
St Neots Eaton Ford by-election 23 November 2006
Party	Candidate	Votes	%	±%
Conservative		658	53.3	+0.9
Liberal Democrats		577	46.7	+6.5
Majority		81	6.6	
Turnout		1,235	23.4	−18.4
Conservative hold		Swing		

=== Warboys and Bury ===
Warboys and Bury by-election 15 February 2007
Party	Candidate	Votes	%	±%
Liberal Democrats		1,122	64.7	+27.9
Conservative		495	28.5	−29.5
UKIP		97	5.6	+5.6
Labour		20	1.2	−4.0
Majority		627	36.2	
Turnout		1,734	37.0	−1.0
Liberal Democrats hold		Swing		
