= 2022 Huntingdonshire District Council election =

2022 local election

- 5 May 2022

All 52 seats to Huntingdonshire District Council 27 seats needed for a majority

	First party	Second party	Third party
Party	Conservative	Independent	Liberal Democrats
Last election	30 seats, 46.6%	5 seats, 5.1%	7 seats, 17.0%
Seats won	22	11	10
Seat change	▼8	▲6	▲3
Popular vote	37,001	11,021	17,130
Percentage	43.5%	13.0%	20.2%
Swing	▼4.3%	▲7.9%	▲3.2%
	Fourth party	Fifth party	Sixth party
Party	Labour	St Neots Ind.	Green
Last election	4 seats, 16.8%	6 seats, 8.1%	0 seats, 0.1%
Seats won	4	4	1
Seat change	Steady	▼2	▲1
Popular vote	10,259	5,926	3,456
Percentage	12.1%	7.0%	4.1%
Swing	▼4.7%	▼1.1%	▲4.0%
- Winner of each seat at the 2022 Huntingdonshire District Council election
Leader of the council before election
Ryan Fuller
Conservative
Leader of the council after election
Sarah Conboy
Liberal Democrats

The 2022 Huntingdonshire District Council election was held on 5 May 2022 to elect members of Huntingdonshire District Council in England. This was on the same day as other local elections.

The elections saw two councillors elected unopposed, the first uncontested elections in the district since 1988.

== Summary ==
=== Background ===
The Conservative Party had been in control of the District Council since 1976. The Conservatives lost eight of their councillors, including the leader of the council, Ryan Fuller. As such the council after the election is under no overall control. A coalition of the Liberal Democrats, Labour, Green and Independent councillors subsequently took control of the council, with Sarah Conboy, the leader of the council's Liberal Democrat group, being appointed leader of the council.

=== Election result ===
2022 Huntingdonshire District Council election
Party	Candidates	Seats	Gains	Losses	Net gain/loss	Seats %	Votes %	Votes	+/−
Conservative	52	22	2	10	▼8	42.3	43.5	37,001	–4.3
Independent	12	11	6	0	▲6	21.2	13.0	11,021	+7.9
Liberal Democrats	18	10	3	0	▲3	19.2	20.2	17,130	+3.2
Labour	20	4	1	1	Steady	7.7	12.1	10,259	–4.7
St Neots Ind.	6	4	0	2	▼2	7.7	7.0	5,926	–1.1
Green	12	1	1	0	▲1	1.9	4.1	3,456	+4.0
Reform	1	0	0	0	Steady	0.0	0.2	206	N/A

== Ward results ==
=== Alconbury ===
Alconbury
Party	Candidate	Votes	%	±%
Conservative	Ian Gardener	690	63.0	+1.8
Green	David Bale	406	37.0	+27.6
Majority				
Turnout		1,096	37.5	
Conservative hold		Swing		

=== Brampton ===
Brampton
Party	Candidate	Votes	%	±%
Liberal Democrats	Dave Shaw	1,616	72.8	+22.0
Liberal Democrats	Patricia Jordan	1,448	65.3	+13.5
Conservative	Cameron Reed	627	28.3	−6.3
Conservative	Raz Ansary	495	22.3	−8.0
Majority				
Turnout		2,219	34.9	
Liberal Democrats hold		Swing		
Liberal Democrats hold		Swing		

=== Buckden ===
Buckden
Party	Candidate	Votes	%	±%
Liberal Democrats	Martin Hassall	686	63.3	+15.1
Conservative	Sam Collins	397	36.7	−15.1
Majority				
Turnout		1,083	39.2	
Liberal Democrats gain from Conservative		Swing		

=== Fenstanton ===
Fenstanton
Party	Candidate	Votes	%	±%
Liberal Democrats	Clare Tevlin	593	50.4	+31.8
Conservative	David Mead	438	37.2	−23.6
Labour	James Hughes	145	12.3	−8.3
Majority				
Turnout		1,176	37.4	
Liberal Democrats gain from Conservative		Swing		

=== Godmanchester and Hemingford Abbots ===
Godmanchester and Hemingford Abbots
Party	Candidate	Votes	%	±%
Liberal Democrats	Sarah Conboy	1,857	67.2	+6.7
Liberal Democrats	Debbie Mickelburgh	1,581	57.2	+7.4
Liberal Democrats	Brett Mickelburgh	1,532	55.4	+10.8
Conservative	Susan Simpson	825	29.9	−9.6
Conservative	Paula Sparling	787	28.5	+0.2
Conservative	Gus Rankin	772	27.9	+0.7
Reform	Sarah Smith	206	7.5	−32.0
Majority				
Turnout		2,763	37.4	
Liberal Democrats hold		Swing		
Liberal Democrats hold		Swing		
Liberal Democrats hold		Swing		

=== Great Paxton ===
Great Paxton
Party	Candidate	Votes	%	±%
Conservative	Richard West	540	49.4	−20.2
Liberal Democrats	Daniel Ashby	435	39.8	+24.9
Labour	Peter Goldsmith	119	10.9	−4.5
Majority				
Turnout		1,094	42.3	
Conservative hold		Swing		

=== Great Staughton ===
Great Staughton
Party	Candidate	Votes	%	±%
Conservative	Stephen Cawley	626	58.2	−4.5
Green	John McCutcheon	231	21.5	N/A
Labour	Alexander Bolingbroke	219	20.4	N/A
Majority				
Turnout		1,076	41.1	
Conservative hold		Swing		

=== Hemingford Grey and Houghton ===
Hemingford Grey and Houghton
Party	Candidate	Votes	%	±%
Conservative	Doug Dew	841	47.4	−15.4
Conservative	David Keane	708	39.9	−16.2
Liberal Democrats	David Priestman	603	34.0	+10.3
Liberal Democrats	Keith Lucas	578	32.6	+11.3
Green	Seona Gunn-Kelly	269	15.2	N/A
Labour	Michael Gleadow	235	13.2	−3.3
Green	Georgie Hunt	123	6.9	N/A
Majority				
Turnout		1,775	37.3	
Conservative hold		Swing		
Conservative hold		Swing		

=== Holywell-cum-Needingworth ===
Holywell-cum-Needingworth
Party	Candidate	Votes	%	±%
Conservative	Paul Hodgson-Jones	Unopposed	N/A	−50.0
Conservative	Jon Neish	Unopposed	N/A	−52.9
Majority		N/A	N/A	
Turnout		N/A	N/A	
Conservative hold		Swing		
Conservative hold		Swing		

=== Huntingdon East ===
Huntingdon East
Party	Candidate	Votes	%	±%
Liberal Democrats	Nathan Hunt	999	52.9	+4.4
Liberal Democrats	Jo Harvey	998	52.9	+12.3
Conservative	Paul Caswell	778	41.2	+0.9
Conservative	Jonas King	762	40.4	+6.5
Majority				
Turnout		1,888	36.2	
Liberal Democrats hold		Swing		
Liberal Democrats hold		Swing		

=== Huntingdon North ===
Huntingdon North
Party	Candidate	Votes	%	±%
Labour	Patrick Kadewere	1,079	52.5	+5.1
Labour	Marion Kadewere	1,016	49.5	+10.0
Labour	Sam Wakeford	950	46.3	+3.0
Conservative	Leedo George	860	41.9	+8.0
Conservative	Simon Burton	856	41.7	+10.5
Conservative	Richard Valatka	753	36.7	+9.8
Majority				
Turnout		2,054	24.9	
Labour hold		Swing		
Labour hold		Swing		
Labour hold		Swing		

=== Kimbolton ===
Kimbolton
Party	Candidate	Votes	%	±%
Conservative	Jonathan Gray	884	71.1	−15.1
Labour	Philip Sly	206	16.6	+2.8
Green	Melina Lafirenze	154	12.4	N/A
Majority				
Turnout		1,244	45.5	
Conservative hold		Swing		

=== Ramsey ===
Ramsey
Party	Candidate	Votes	%	±%
Conservative	Steve Corney	1,477	63.0	+12.0
Conservative	Jeff Clarke	1,400	59.7	+10.9
Conservative	Roger Brereton	1,247	53.2	+4.0
Liberal Democrats	Tony Hulme	719	30.6	+19.1
Labour	Matthew Toyer	704	30.0	+16.2
Majority				
Turnout		2,346	28.9	
Conservative hold		Swing		
Conservative hold		Swing		
Conservative hold		Swing		

=== Sawtry ===
Sawtry
Party	Candidate	Votes	%	±%
Conservative	Simon Bywater	Unopposed	N/A	−65.3
Conservative	Ross Martin	Unopposed	N/A	N/A
Majority		N/A	N/A	
Turnout		N/A	N/A	
Conservative hold		Swing		
Conservative gain from Independent		Swing		

=== Somersham ===
Somersham
Party	Candidate	Votes	%	±%
Conservative	Steve Criswell	548	64.9	+6.3
Labour	Martha Evans	296	35.1	+16.6
Majority				
Turnout		844	29.5	
Conservative hold		Swing		

=== St Ives East ===
St Ives East
Party	Candidate	Votes	%	±%
Independent	Michael Burke	853	53.4	N/A
Independent	Shariqa Mokbul	751	47.0	N/A
Conservative	Adam Roberts	722	45.2	−7.9
Conservative	Craig Smith	687	43.0	−9.5
Majority				
Turnout		1,597	32.1	
Independent gain from Conservative		Swing		
Independent gain from Conservative		Swing		

=== St Ives South ===
St Ives South
Party	Candidate	Votes	%	±%
Liberal Democrats	Nic Wells	1,157	55.1	+30.1
Labour	Cath Gleadow	976	46.5	+10.9
Conservative	Rianna D'Souza	765	36.4	−12.3
Conservative	Martin Gill	727	34.6	−9.7
Majority				
Turnout		2,100	35.2	
Liberal Democrats gain from Conservative		Swing		
Labour gain from Conservative		Swing		

=== St Ives West ===
St Ives West
Party	Candidate	Votes	%	±%
Independent	Julie Kerr	423	47.0	N/A
Conservative	Ryan Fuller	397	44.1	−13.9
Green	Daniel Laycock	80	8.9	N/A
Majority				
Turnout		900	40.1	
Independent gain from Conservative		Swing		

=== St Neots East ===
St Neots East
Party	Candidate	Votes	%	±%
Green	Lara Davenport-Ray	772	85.0	N/A
Independent	Marcus Pickering	666	73.3	N/A
Conservative	Mokbul Ahmed	53	5.8	−34.1
Conservative	Ari Laakkonen	49	5.4	−22.8
Majority				
Turnout		908	35.8	
Green gain from Labour		Swing		
Independent gain from Conservative		Swing		

=== St Neots Eatons ===
St Neots Eatons
Party	Candidate	Votes	%	±%
The St Neots Independent Group	Barry Banks	875	32.9	-25.1
Conservative	Andrew Jennings	818	30.8	+2.9
Conservative	Graham Welton	814	30.6	−0.8
The St Neots Independent Group	Colin Maslen	787	29.6	−18.6
Conservative	Neal Weston	763	28.7	+4.0
The St Neots Independent Group	Gordon Thorpe	761	28.6	−25.5
Liberal Democrats	Jacqueline Hunt	626	23.6	+15.2
Independent	Bob Farrer	502	18.9	N/A
Liberal Democrats	Geoffrey Seeff	501	18.8	N/A
Liberal Democrats	James Catmur	465	17.5	N/A
Green	Catherine Goodman	301	11.3	N/A
Green	Anna Pritchard	190	7.1	N/A
Green	Thomas Allard	185	7.0	N/A
Majority				
Turnout		2,658	31.4	
The St Neots Independent Group hold		Swing		
Conservative gain from The St Neots Independent Group		Swing		
Conservative gain from The St Neots Independent Group		Swing		

=== St Neots Eynesbury ===
St Neots Eynesbury
Party	Candidate	Votes	%	±%
St Neots Ind.	Simone Taylor	1,273	47.9	+3.0
St Neots Ind.	Ian Taylor	1,155	43.5	+7.8
St Neots Ind.	Doug Terry	1,075	40.5	+0.7
Conservative	Sue Beeby	854	32.2	−0.4
Conservative	Nigel Eaton	769	29.0	−2.1
Conservative	Luke Millar	741	27.9	−3.1
Labour	Amy Duckworth	596	22.4	+0.9
Labour	Helen Stroud	549	20.7	+2.1
Labour	Victoria Fowler	543	20.5	N/A
Majority				
Turnout		2,655	29.9	
The St Neots Independent Group hold		Swing		
The St Neots Independent Group hold		Swing		
The St Neots Independent Group hold		Swing		

=== St Neots Priory Park and Little Paxton ===
St Neots Priory Park and Little Paxton
Party	Candidate	Votes	%	±%
Independent	Stephen Ferguson	1,698	62.5	N/A
Independent	Ben Pitt	1,485	54.7	N/A
Independent	Richard Slade	1,306	48.1	N/A
Conservative	Jean Matheson	1,081	39.8	+3.0
Conservative	Keith Prentice	888	32.7	−1.0
Conservative	Malcolm Whale	886	32.6	+7.9
Majority				
Turnout		2,717	35.0	
Independent hold		Swing		
Independent gain from Conservative		Swing		
Independent gain from Conservative		Swing		

=== Stilton, Folksworth and Washingley ===
Stilton, Folksworth and Washingley
Party	Candidate	Votes	%	±%
Conservative	Tim Alban	1,331	70.1	−2.6
Conservative	Marge Beuttell	1,111	58.5	−3.4
Labour	Margaret Cochrane	398	21.0	+2.5
Labour	Robert Bowden	348	18.3	+2.0
Green	Rebecca Davis-Marsh	329	17.3	N/A
Majority				
Turnout		1,898	36.7	
Conservative hold		Swing		
Conservative hold		Swing		

=== The Stukeleys ===
The Stukeleys
Party	Candidate	Votes	%	±%
Independent	Tom Sanderson	926	66.6	+6.2
Independent	Ann Blackwell	754	54.2	+9.0
Independent	Steve McAdam	750	54.0	+15.7
Conservative	Phil Pearce	489	35.2	+3.3
Conservative	Pete Digby	437	31.4	−0.2
Conservative	Peter Brown	379	27.3	−1.1
Majority				
Turnout		1,390	34.0	
Independent hold		Swing		
Independent hold		Swing		
Independent hold		Swing		

=== Warboys ===
Warboys
Party	Candidate	Votes	%	±%
Conservative	Adela Costello	1,048	57.7	−3.9
Conservative	Charlotte Lowe	954	52.6	−8.3
Labour	Iain Ramsbottom	459	25.3	+5.6
Labour	Ambrose Ntuk	427	23.5	+5.2
Green	Beth Watson	416	22.9	N/A
Majority				
Turnout		1,815	30.9	
Conservative hold		Swing		
Conservative hold		Swing		

=== Yaxley ===
Yaxley
Party	Candidate	Votes	%	±%
Conservative	Eric Butler	1,128	50.9	−10.1
Conservative	Kevin Gulson	1,054	47.6	−8.0
Independent	Sally Howell	907	40.9	N/A
Conservative	Mac McGuire	745	33.6	−9.5
Liberal Democrats	Andrew Wood	736	33.2	N/A
Labour	Richard Ilett	510	23.0	−0.9
Labour	Tony Lawson	484	21.8	−2.0
Majority				
Turnout		2,216	26.6	
Conservative hold		Swing		
Conservative hold		Swing		
Independent gain from Conservative		Swing		

== Changes 2022–2026 ==
- Douglas Dew (Hemingford Gray & Houghton), who had been elected as a Conservative crossed the floor to join the Liberal Democrats on 9 January 2023.
- Martin Hassall, elected as a Liberal Democrat, left the party to sit as an independent in May 2024.
- Michael Burke, who was elected as an independent joined the Liberal Democrats.
- Tom Sanderson and Ann Blackwell who had been elected as Independents joined the Liberal Democrats in February 2026.

=== Great Paxton ===
Great Paxton by-election, 2 May 2024
Party	Candidate	Votes	%	±%
Liberal Democrats	James Catmur	518	47.8	+8.0
Conservative	Ari Laakkonen	414	38.2	−11.2
Labour	James Hughes	102	9.4	−1.5
Green	Catherine Goodman	49	4.5	+4.5
Majority		104	9.6	N/A
Turnout		1,091	42.2	−0.1
Liberal Democrats gain from Conservative		Swing	+9.6	

The Great Paxton by-election was triggered by the resignation of Conservative councillor Richard West.

=== St Neots Eatons ===
St Neots Eatons by-election, 19 September 2024
Party	Candidate	Votes	%	±%
Independent	Barry Chapman	531	32.7	+32.7
Liberal Democrats	Alan Hunt	426	26.2	+6.1
Conservative	Nigel Eaton	420	25.9	−0.3
Independent	Rob Simonis	125	7.7	+7.7
Labour	Harvey Woodhouse	77	4.7	+4.7
Green	Andrew Seal	45	2.8	−6.8
Majority		105	6.5	
Turnout		1,624		
Independent gain from Conservative		Swing		
