= Chotzner =

Chotzner is a surname. Notable people with the surname include:

- Alfred Chotzner (1873–1958), British judge and Conservative politician
- Joseph Chotzner (1844–1914), first rabbi of the Jewish community in Belfast, Ireland
