= Herbert Holt =

Herbert Holt may refer to:

- Herbert Samuel Holt (1856–1941), Canadian engineer and businessman
- Herbert Paton Holt (1890–1971), his son, British army officer and Member of Parliament
- Herbert Holt (snooker player) (1909–2002), English snooker player
