= Arthur Lewis (British politician) =

British politician (1917–1998)

Member of Parliament for Newham North West West Ham North (1950-Feb 1974) Upton (1945-1950)
- In office 5 July 1945 – 13 May 1983
- Preceded by: Ben Gardner
- Succeeded by: Tony Banks

Personal details
- Born: Arthur William John Lewis; 21 February 1917
- Died: 25 June 1998 (aged 81)
- Party: Labour
- Occupation: Politician

Arthur William John Lewis (21 February 1917 – 25 June 1998) was a British Labour Party politician.

== Biography ==
Lewis was educated at Borough Polytechnic and began work as a fitter with the City of London Corporation. He was an official of the National Union of General and Municipal Workers from 1938 to 1948. He signed the first trade union agreement with the catering industry and gained 20,000 new trade union members in the West End, London.

Lewis was Member of Parliament (MP) for Upton from 1945 to 1950, for West Ham North from 1950 to 1974, and then for Newham North West from 1974 to 1983. He was known in Parliament for his partisan rhetoric: Andrew Roth, in The MPs' Chart (1979), described Lewis as a "Champ Cockney nagger" and "Loud hogcaller." Although on the left of the party, he had a socially conservative streak, as demonstrated by the fact he was one of just three Labour MPs (the other two were Jack Dunnett and Leslie Spriggs) who supported the return of capital punishment in a parliamentary vote on the matter in 1979.

In 1981, after 36 years as an MP, Lewis was deselected as Labour candidate by his local constituency Labour Party, which he said had become "100 per cent Trotskyist, Militant Tendency, Communist and IRA supporters". By this time he was refusing to attend local party meetings or hold "advice surgeries" for his constituents.

He was replaced as Labour candidate by the future minister Tony Banks. Lewis stood as an Independent Labour candidate at the 1983 election, coming fourth with 11% of the vote, behind the winner, Banks.

== Notes ==
Parliament of the United Kingdom
Preceded by Benjamin Walter Gardner	Member of Parliament for Upton; 1945–1950	constituency abolished
New constituency	Member of Parliament for West Ham North; 1950–February 1974	constituency abolished
New constituency	Member of Parliament for Newham North West; February 1974–1983	Succeeded by Tony Banks
