= Hammersmith North =

Hammersmith North could refer to:

- Hammersmith North (UK Parliament constituency)
- Hammersmith North (electoral division), Greater London Council
- Hammersmith North (London County Council constituency)
