= Lord Stratford =

Lord Stratford may refer to:

- Stratford Canning, 1st Viscount Stratford de Redcliffe (1786–1880), British diplomat and politician
- Tony Banks, Baron Stratford (1942–2006), British Labour politician
