= Lord Toby Jug =

British politician (1965–2019)

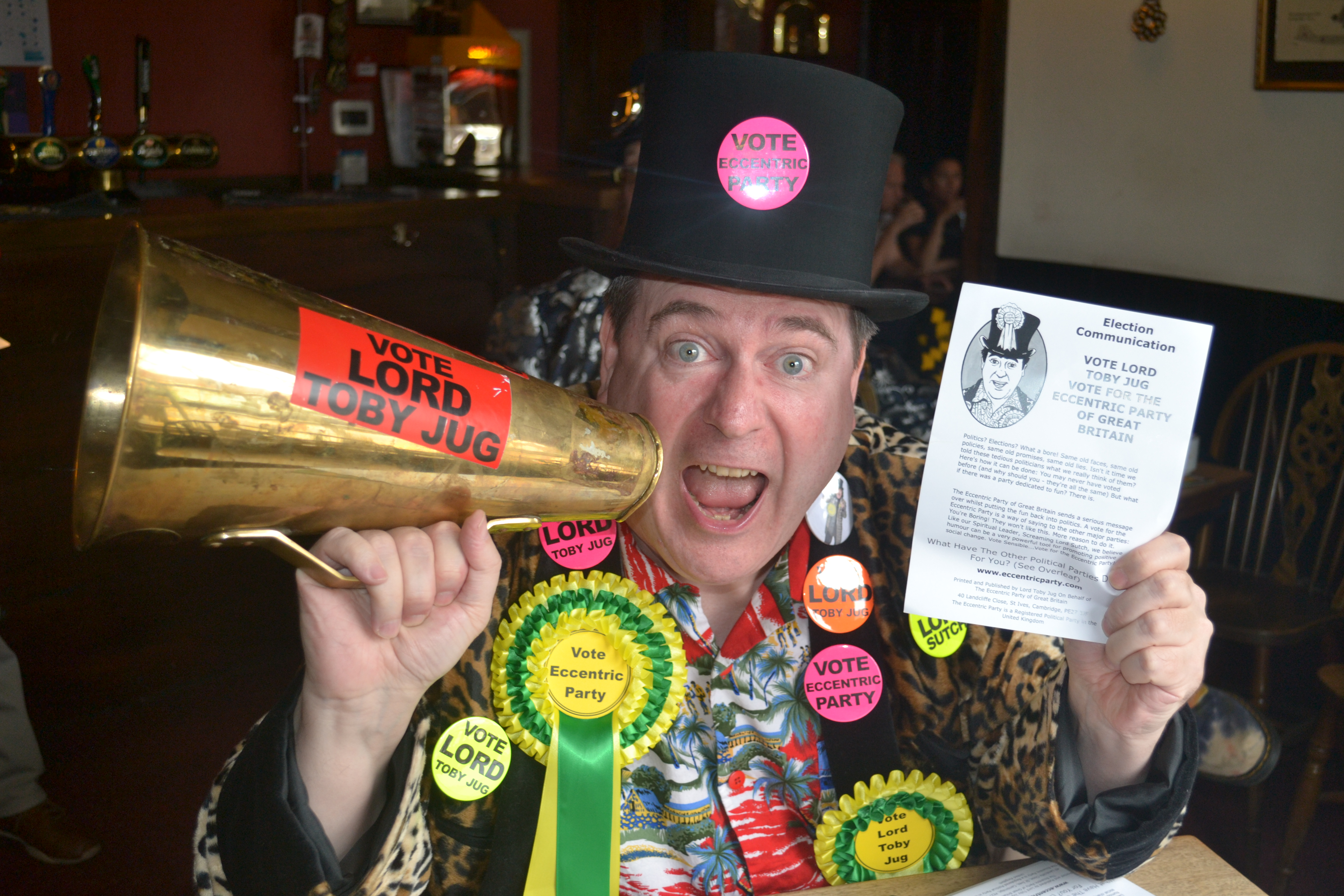
- Jug at the official opening of the Ramsey Branch of the Eccentric Party in 2016
- Born: Brian Borthwick; 18 December 1965; West Ham, London, England
- Died: 2 May 2019 (aged 53)
- Political party: Official Monster Raving Loony Party (until 2014); UK Independence Party (2016); The Eccentric Party of Great Britain (2015–19)

Lord Toby Jug (born Brian Borthwick, 18 December 1965 – 2 May 2019) was a British politician. He was the leader of the Cambridgeshire and Huntingdonshire branch of the Official Monster Raving Loony Party, serving as the party's media officer and a prospective parliamentary candidate, until being expelled from the Loony Party in 2014. He founded The Eccentric Party of Great Britain in 2015.

== Party involvement ==
=== Monster Raving Loony Party ===
Lord Toby Jug joined the Monster Raving Loony Party in 1987, and described himself as its Shadow Minister for Mental Health.

In April 2009, Jug called for the statue of Oliver Cromwell in St Ives to be replaced by one of Screaming Lord Sutch. In 2012, Jug presided over a blue plaque unveiling at London's Ace Cafe in memory of Sutch, a longtime South Harrow resident, who died in 1999. The plaque was paid for by the bookmaker and online gambling organisation William Hill, a former sponsor of the Loony Party. In November 2013 Jug held a graveside gathering celebrating the life of Screaming Lord Sutch.

During the 2013 South Shields by-election campaign, Jug wrote to The Guardian and The Independent, claiming that the Loony Party objected to the terms "fruitcakes" and "loonies" being applied to UK Independence Party and other parliamentary candidates. He went on to describe UKIP as "nothing but opportunists, seeking a populist platform for their extremist views".

Jug was expelled from the Monster Raving Loony Party in 2014 over comments made about UKIP leader Nigel Farage, and for his criticism of pub chain J D Wetherspoon, a company which the Loony party had been attempting to attract as a sponsor. Party leader Howling Laud Hope said that it was "about the fourth time we have asked him to leave the party" and that the Loony Party was "not in the game of upsetting people". When leaving the party, Jug expressed concern over racist comments expressed by Hope in a Guardian article from 14 years previously.

=== The Eccentric Party of Great Britain ===
In January 2015 Jug founded "The Eccentric Party of Great Britain" in St Ives, after the Electoral Commission had rejected more than 30 suggested names, including the "Real Loony Party" and the "United Kingdom Independent Loony Party", for being too similar to those of other parties.

=== UKIP ===
In 2016, Jug briefly joined the UK Independence Party as a joke, intending to stand as leader following the resignation of Diane James; he said that he was "stunned" that the party had allowed his membership.

=== General and council elections ===
Jug stood in two general elections against Tony Banks in Newham North West in 1992, and its successor, West Ham in 1997.

At the 2005 general election, Jug stood against then Conservative leader Michael Howard in Folkestone and Hythe as "Lord Toby Jug Borthwick". Jug polled 175 votes beating three other candidates.

At the 2009 Cambridgeshire County Council election, Jug polled 566 votes in St Ives division, more than either Labour candidate and also raised £275 for the Teenage Cancer Trust. At the 2010 general election, he stood as candidate for Huntingdon and polled 548 votes. In May 2012, Jug campaigned in the District Council Elections, polling 118 votes, coming last. In March 2012, Jug announced plans to stand as a joke candidate for the position of Cambridgeshire's Police and Crime Commissioner. In June 2012 Jug stood in the St Ives Town Council by-election, and polled slightly ahead of the Liberal Democrat candidate.

At the launch of the 2013 Cambridgeshire County Council election campaign, Jug was accompanied by Loony minister for floating voters Lady Jezebel Fortescue Luxury Yacht and accidentally dropped his leaflets into the River Great Ouse. He later polled 197 votes, again standing for St Ives division.

In 2015, Jug announced his intention to stand as a prospective parliamentary candidate for Huntingdon at the general election, for The Eccentric Party of Great Britain. He joked that he should be included in the televised leaders' debates, because "although we are a small party, so are the Liberal Democrats". A month before the election, Jug planned to stand in both Huntingdon and the constituency of Uxbridge and South Ruislip, after the Eccentric Party's original candidate for the second area fell ill. When told he could not stand in two constituencies, Jug stood down from the Huntingdon election. Standing against Boris Johnson, and against Howling Laud Hope of the Monster Raving Loony Party, Jug polled 50 votes.

== Personal life ==
As Brian Borthwick, Jug was the guitarist in a band with the Loony Party's founder, Screaming Lord Sutch. Sutch gave him the nickname "Toby Jug" because of his rotund appearance, and Borthwick later adopted the name by deed poll. He described himself as a "professional jester", regarding his Union Jack-wearing Loony persona as an "alter ego". He wore a top hat which previously belonged to Lord Sutch.

In May 2014, Jug publicly admitted suffering from alcoholism. The same month, Jug took part in the film A Different Drummer: Celebrating Eccentrics.

Jug died on 2 May 2019, at the age of 53.

== Elections contested ==
Date	Election	Constituency	Party	Votes	% votes	Position	Ref.
1992 General Election	Parliamentary	Newham North West	Raving Loony Green Giant	252	1.0	5th of 6	
1993 Newham London Borough Council by-election	Local authority	Park ward	Official Monster Raving Loony Party	60	3.7	5th of 5	
1997 General Election	Parliamentary	West Ham	Official Monster Raving Loony Party	300	0.9	5th of 6	
1998 Newham London Borough Council election	Local authority	Stratford ward	Official Monster Raving Loony Party	76	6.4	6th of 6	
2005 General Election	Parliamentary	Folkestone and Hythe	Official Monster Raving Loony Party	175	0.4	6th of 9	
2009 Cambridgeshire County Council election	Local authority	St Ives division	Official Monster Raving Loony Party	566	6.2	5th of 7	
2010 General Election	Parliamentary	Huntingdon	Official Monster Raving Loony Party	548	1.0	7th of 8	
2012 Huntingdonshire District Council election	Local authority	St Ives East ward	Official Monster Raving Loony Party	118	8.4	5th of 5	
2012 St Ives Town Council election	Local authority	St Ives South ward	Official Monster Raving Loony Party	354	20.6	11th of 11	
2012 Huntingdonshire District Council by-election	Local authority	Earith ward	Official Monster Raving Loony Party	56	4.6	5th of 5	
2012 St Ives Town Council by-election	Local authority	St Ives East ward	Official Monster Raving Loony Party	40	0.5	5th of 6	
2013 Cambridgeshire County Council election	Local authority	St Ives division	Official Monster Raving Loony Party	197	2.5	9th of 9	
2015 General Election	Parliamentary	Uxbridge and South Ruislip	Eccentric Party of Great Britain	50	0.1	10th of 13	
2016 Witney by-election	Parliamentary	Witney	Eccentric Party of Great Britain	59	0.2	11th of 14	
