= Lyn Brown =

British politician (born 1960)

The Right Honourable The Baroness Brown of Silvertown
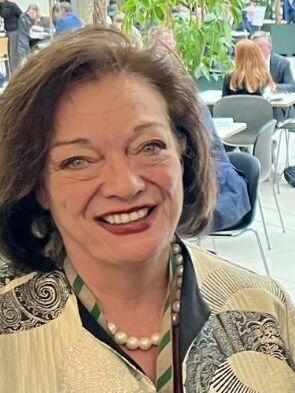

Shadow Minister for Africa
- In office 4 December 2021 – 5 July 2024
- Leader: Keir Starmer
- Preceded by: Stephen Doughty
- Succeeded by: Harriett Baldwin

Shadow Minister for Prisons and Probation
- In office 9 April 2020 – 4 December 2021
- Leader: Keir Starmer
- Preceded by: Yasmin Qureshi
- Succeeded by: Ellie Reeves

Shadow Exchequer Secretary to the Treasury
- In office 12 January 2018 – 9 April 2020
- Leader: Jeremy Corbyn
- Preceded by: Rebecca Long-Bailey
- Succeeded by: Wes Streeting

Acting Shadow Home Secretary
- In office 7 June 2017 – 18 June 2017
- Leader: Jeremy Corbyn
- Preceded by: Diane Abbott
- Succeeded by: Diane Abbott

Shadow Minister of State for Policing
- In office 8 October 2016 – 7 June 2017
- Leader: Jeremy Corbyn
- Preceded by: Jack Dromey
- Succeeded by: Louise Haigh

Member of Parliament for West Ham
- In office 5 May 2005 – 30 May 2024
- Preceded by: Tony Banks
- Succeeded by: Constituency abolished

Member of the House of Lords
- Lord Temporal
- Life peerage 23 January 2025

Personal details
- Born: Lyn Carol Brown; 13 April 1960 (age 66) London, England
- Party: Labour
- Spouse: John Cullen
- Education: University of Roehampton
- Website: www.lynbrown.org.uk

Lyn Carol Brown, Baroness Brown of Silvertown (born 13 April 1960), is a British politician who served as Member of Parliament (MP) for West Ham from 2005 to 2024. A member of the Labour Party, she was a shadow minister in the Home Office from 2015 to 2016, Shadow Policing Minister from 2016 to 2017, Shadow Exchequer Secretary to the Treasury from 2018 to 2020, and Shadow Minister for Prisons and Probation from 2020 to 2021. She served as the Shadow Minister for Africa until standing down from Parliament in 2024, and was subsequently appointed to the House of Lords as a life peer.

== Early life and career ==
Brown was born in London to Joseph and Iris Brown. She was educated at Drew Road Primary School, Silvertown and Plashet Comprehensive School before attending the Whitelands College, Putney (now part of Roehampton University). In 1984 she began work as a social worker for the London Borough of Ealing.

She was elected as a councillor to Newham London Borough Council in 1988. She unsuccessfully contested Wanstead and Woodford at the 1992 general election but was beaten by 16,885 votes by the Conservative James Arbuthnot.

== Parliamentary career ==
In 2005, West Ham MP Tony Banks retired and Lyn Brown was selected to contest the safe Labour seat through an all-women shortlist. Lyn Brown became the seat's MP at the 2005 general election with a majority of 9,801 votes. She made her maiden speech on 23 May 2005.

In 2006, Brown became the parliamentary private secretary to the Communities and Local Government Minister, Phil Woolas. In July 2007 she was appointed parliamentary private secretary to John Denham, Secretary of State for Innovation, Universities and Skills.

In 2009, Brown signed the motion that created Labour Friends of Palestine and the Middle East, but withdrew her signature upon its founding.

In June 2009 she was promoted to become an assistant government whip. She remained as a whip, in opposition, following the 2010 general election.

In June 2011, Brown was criticised by campaigners for recruiting an unpaid intern whilst also supporting "a living wage for all". Gus Baker of Intern Aware stated Brown had replaced a paid member of staff with an unpaid intern, accusing her of double hypocrisy and noting how such conduct denied opportunities to poorer people such as those from Brown's constituency. Brown stated she "would like to pay everyone" in her office, but "did not have the resources to do so".

In October 2013, Brown was appointed by Ed Miliband to serve as Shadow Minister for Communities and Local Government.

In September 2015, she was appointed as a Shadow Home Office Minister by Labour leader Jeremy Corbyn, a position from which she resigned on 28 June 2016, before subsequently supporting Owen Smith in the 2016 Labour leadership election. In October 2016, Corbyn reappointed Brown to serve as a Shadow Minister, as Shadow Minister for Policing, during which time, Brown temporarily replaced Diane Abbott as Shadow Home Secretary during a period of ill health for Abbott.

Brown stood down at the 2024 general election, and was subsequently nominated for a Labour Party life peerage by Prime Minister Keir Starmer. She was created Baroness Brown of Silvertown, of West Ham in the London Borough of Newham, on 23 January 2025, and was introduced to the House of Lords on 27 January.

== Personal life ==
In May 2008 Brown married John Cullen and exercised her privilege as a member of Parliament to hold the ceremony in the Chapel of St Mary Undercroft in the Palace of Westminster. The ceremony was performed by fellow Labour MP and former vicar Chris Bryant.

Until May 2009, Brown rented a central London flat using the second home allowance, despite her constituency being only 6 miles from Westminster.

Brown's hobbies include reading crime fiction and walking.

Parliament of the United Kingdom
| Preceded by Tony Banks | Member of Parliament for West Ham; 2005–2024 | Constituency abolished |
Political offices
| Preceded by Diane Abbott | Shadow Home Secretary; Acting; 2017 | Succeeded by Diane Abbott |
