= West Ham (constituency) =

UK Parliament constituency (1997–2024)

Coordinates: 51.540°N 0.013°E

- Former borough constituency for the House of Commons
- Boundary of West Ham in Greater London
- County: Greater London
- Electorate: 86,400 (December 2010)
- Major settlements: Canning Town, Forest Gate, Maryland, Plaistow, Stratford, and West Ham

1997–2024
- Seats: One
- Created from: Newham North West, Newham South
- Replaced by: Stratford and Bow, West Ham and Beckton

West Ham was a constituency (Note: A borough constituency (for the purposes of election expenses and type of returning officer)) created in 1997 and represented in the House of Commons of the UK Parliament from 2005 until its abolition for the 2024 general election by Lyn Brown, a member of the Labour Party. (Note: As with all constituencies, the constituency elects one Member of Parliament (MP) by the first past the post system of election at least every five years.)

Under the 2023 periodic review of Westminster constituencies, the seat was abolished and the majority incorporated into the new constituency of West Ham and Beckton. The two Forest Gate wards, Stratford and New Town, and the Green Street West ward now form the majority of the new constituency of Stratford and Bow.

== Boundaries ==
Map of boundaries 2010-2024

1997–2010: The London Borough of Newham wards of Bemersyde, Forest Gate, Hudsons, New Town, Park, Plaistow, Plashet, Stratford, Upton, and West Ham.

2010–2024: The London Borough of Newham wards of Canning Town North, Canning Town South, Custom House, Forest Gate North, Forest Gate South, Green Street West, Plaistow North, Plaistow South, Stratford and New Town, and West Ham.

The constituency covered the western half of Newham stretching from the Thames just east of Leamouth to Stratford. The boundary changes that took effect for the 2010 general election expanded the constituency by adding Canning Town from the abolished Poplar and Canning Town constituency, whilst losing Silvertown to the redrawn East Ham. The boundary with the East Ham constituency was modified to align with local government ward boundaries.

== History ==
The seat was created in 1997 by the fourth periodic review (following the first such review in 1945), undertaken by the Boundary Commission, from portions of the Newham North West and Newham South seats.

The area's elections to date, including both forerunner seats have returned safe majorities for the Labour Party since the last Conservative for the smaller, denser divisions from 1931 to 1934; (Note: Upton) going back further, West Ham South had in 1892 sent Keir Hardie to the Commons who co-founded the party.

The first member, Tony Banks, served the main predecessor seat, Newham North West from 1983 and was Minister for Sport (1997–1999). He held this seat at the 2001 general election with nearly 70% of the vote and a local record majority of 53.5% of the vote. He retired from the House of Commons at the 2005 general election.

The 2010 result, not only on the notional result, accommodating boundary changes, but also on predecessor-successor seat analysis shows that the main beneficiary of the runner-up Respect vote, as they did not have a candidate in that year, was the Labour candidate. The 2015 result made the seat the 14th safest of Labour's 232 seats by percentage of majority.

== Constituency profile ==
Helped by proximity to the City of London and exporting businesses in areas such as Hackney, Shoreditch and the Thames Gateway, the area is only gradually recovering in terms of employment rates from the deep East End decline, particularly decline of the dockers' industry here of the 1950s to the 1980s, with an immediate boost from the 2010 creation of the London Olympic Village and Park. In November 2012, workless claimants who were registered jobseekers were significantly higher than the national average of 3.8%, at 7.7% of the population based on a statistical compilation by The Guardian, though not the highest in London. Within this figure is a skew toward male unemployment which was at 9.8%

Now that the Olympic stadium has become West Ham United's home the club is located in the constituency that shares its name; their previous ground at Upton Park was actually in the neighbouring East Ham seat.

=== Demographics ===
In the 1991 census just over 43% of residents were non-white. By the time of the 2001 census, people who identified as white made up 44.1% of the population and 35.3% of residents were born outside the UK, and in the 2011 census the borough saw an increase in those of mixed colour ethnicity at 4.6%, and saw the lowest proportion of people of solely white ethnicity at 29.0%, the figure for those of black ethnicity had fallen to 19.6%, and those of South Asian ethnicity had risen to 43.5% of the population.

In terms of religion the British Asian population is more than 50% Muslim in this constituency. By the time of the 2005 general election, only seven of the 646 constituencies had more Muslims than West Ham. Respect fielded a candidate for the 2005 election, hoping to benefit from opposition to the Iraq war; in the end this was not enough to unseat Labour's replacement for Banks, Lyn Brown, but Respect managed to take nearly 20% of the vote.

== Members of Parliament ==
Election	Member	Party
1997	Tony Banks	Labour
2005	Lyn Brown	Labour

== Election results ==
=== Elections in the 2010s ===
2019 general election: West Ham
Party	Candidate	Votes	%	±%
Labour	Lyn Brown	42,181	70.1	−6.6
Conservative	Sara Kumar	9,793	16.3	+0.1
Liberal Democrats	Eimear O’Casey	4,161	6.9	+3.9
Green	Danny Keeling	1,780	3.0	+1.4
Brexit Party	Emma Stockdale	1,679	2.8	New
CPA	Paul Jobson	463	0.8	+0.2
Communities United	Humera Kamran	143	0.2	New
Majority		32,388	53.8	−6.7
Turnout		60,200	61.5	−4.2
Registered electors		97,942		
Labour hold		Swing	-3.4	

2017 general election: West Ham
Party	Candidate	Votes	%	±%
Labour	Lyn Brown	46,591	76.7	+8.3
Conservative	Patrick Spencer	9,837	16.2	+0.8
Liberal Democrats	Paul Reynolds	1,836	3.0	+0.3
UKIP	Rosamund Beattie	1,134	1.9	−5.6
Green	Michael Spracklin	957	1.6	−3.4
CPA	Kayode Shedowo	353	0.6	−0.1
Majority		36,754	60.5	+7.5
Turnout		60,708	65.7	+7.5
Registered electors		92,418		
Labour hold		Swing	+3.8	

2015 general election: West Ham
Party	Candidate	Votes	%	±%
Labour	Lyn Brown	36,132	68.4	+5.7
Conservative	Festus Akinbusoye	8,146	15.4	+0.7
UKIP	Jamie Ross-McKenzie	3,950	7.5	+5.9
Green	Rachel Collinson	2,651	5.0	+3.6
Liberal Democrats	Paul Reynolds	1,430	2.7	−8.8
CPA	Andy Uzoka	369	0.7	−2.1
Communities United	Cydatty Bogie	115	0.2	New
Majority		27,986	53.0	+5.0
Turnout		52,793	58.2	+3.2
Registered electors		90,640		
Labour hold		Swing	+2.5	

2010 general election: West Ham
Party	Candidate	Votes	%	±%
Labour	Lyn Brown	29,422	62.7	+10.9
Conservative	Virginia Morris	6,888	14.7	+2.6
Liberal Democrats	Martin Pierce	5,392	11.5	+1.3
CPA	Stan Gain	1,327	2.8	+1.7
Independent	Kamran Malik	1,245	2.7	New
National Front	Michael Davidson	1,089	2.3	New
UKIP	Kim Gandy	766	1.6	+0.6
Green	Jane Lithgow	645	1.4	−1.6
Independent	Grace Agbogun-Toko	177	0.4	New
Majority		22,534	48.0	+16.3
Turnout		46,951	55.0	+10.2
Registered electors		85,313		
Labour hold		Swing	+4.2	

The Green Party originally selected Jane Lithgow as their candidate for the 2010 election.

=== Elections in the 2000s ===
2005 general election: West Ham
Party	Candidate	Votes	%	±%
Labour	Lyn Brown	15,840	51.2	−18.7
Respect	Lindsey German	6,039	19.5	New
Conservative	Chris L. Whitbread	3,618	11.7	−4.7
Liberal Democrats	Alexandra E. Sugden	3,364	10.9	+3.5
Green	Jane A. Lithgow	894	2.9	−1.2
CPA	Stephen C. Hammond	437	1.4	New
UKIP	Henry E.B. Mayhew	409	1.3	−0.9
Veritas	Generoso Alcantara	365	1.2	New
Majority		9,801	31.7	−21.8
Turnout		30,966	49.8	+0.9
Registered electors		62,188		
Labour hold		Swing	-19.1	

2001 general election: West Ham
Party	Candidate	Votes	%	±%
Labour	Tony Banks	20,449	69.9	−3.0
Conservative	Syed Kamall	4,804	16.4	+1.4
Liberal Democrats	Paul J. Fox	2,166	7.4	0.0
Green	Jackie M. Chandler-Oatts	1,197	4.1	New
UKIP	Gerard Batten	657	2.2	New
Majority		15,645	53.5	−4.4
Turnout		29,273	48.9	−9.6
Registered electors		59,828		
Labour hold		Swing	-2.2	

=== Elections in the 1990s ===
1997 general election: West Ham
Party	Candidate	Votes	%	±%
Labour	Tony Banks	24,531	72.9	
Conservative	Mark MacGregor	5,037	15.0	
Liberal Democrats	Samantha L.C. McDonough	2,479	7.4	
BNP	Kenneth Francis	1,198	3.6	
Monster Raving Loony	Toby Jug	300	0.9	
Rainbow Dream Ticket	Jonathan P. Rainbow	116	0.3	
Majority		19,494	57.9	
Turnout		33,361	58.5	
Registered electors		57,589		
Labour win (new seat)				

== See also ==
- List of parliamentary constituencies in London
