= Fulham (electoral division) =

Electoral division in Greater London, 1973–1986

- Former electoral division for the Greater London Council
- District: Hammersmith (1973/1977); Hammersmith and Fulham (1981)
- Electorate: 60,198 (1973); 56,311 (1977); 52,474 (1981)
- Major settlements: Fulham
- Area: 694 hectares (6.94 km^{2})

Former electoral division
- Created: 1973
- Abolished: 1986
- Member: 1
- Created from: Hammersmith

Fulham was an electoral division for the purposes of elections to the Greater London Council. The constituency elected one councillor for a four-year term in 1973, 1977 and 1981, with the final term extended for an extra year ahead of the abolition of the Greater London Council.

== History ==
It was planned to use the same boundaries as the Westminster Parliament constituencies for election of councillors to the Greater London Council (GLC), as had been the practice for elections to the predecessor London County Council, but those that existed in 1965 crossed the Greater London boundary. Until new constituencies could be settled, the 32 London boroughs were used as electoral areas. The London Borough of Hammersmith formed the Hammersmith electoral division. This was used for the Greater London Council elections in 1964, 1967 and 1970.

The new constituencies were settled following the Second Periodic Review of Westminster constituencies and the new electoral division matched the boundaries of the Fulham parliamentary constituency.

It covered an area of 694 hectares (6.94 km^{2}).

== Elections ==
The Fulham constituency was used for the Greater London Council elections in 1973, 1977 and 1981. One councillor was elected at each election using first-past-the-post voting.

=== 1973 election ===
The fourth election to the GLC (and first using revised boundaries) was held on 12 April 1973. The electorate was 60,198 and one Labour Party councillor was elected. The turnout was 45.4%. The councillor was elected for a three-year term. This was extended for an extra year in 1976 when the electoral cycle was switched to four-yearly.

1973 Greater London Council election: Fulham
Party	Candidate	Votes	%	±%
Labour	Anthony Louis Banks	15,176	55.59	
Conservative	A. F. E. Johnston	9,926	36.34	
Liberal	Derek J P Honeygold	2,002	7.33	
Independent	M. S. Ashworth	202	0.74	
Turnout				
Labour win (new seat)				

=== 1977 election ===
The fifth election to the GLC (and second using revised boundaries) was held on 5 May 1977. The electorate was 56,311 and one Conservative Party councillor was elected. The turnout was 51.1%. The councillor was elected for a four-year term.

1977 Greater London Council election: Fulham
Party	Candidate	Votes	%	±%
Conservative	John Charles Putnam	15,923	55.29	
Labour	Mary-Lou Clarke	10,808	37.53	
Liberal	Cyril J Barnes	985	3.42	
National Front	David Sturman	863	2.99	
Independent	C. B. Delpech	221	0.77	
Turnout				
Conservative gain from Labour		Swing		

=== 1981 election ===
The sixth and final election to the GLC (and third using revised boundaries) was held on 7 May 1981. The electorate was 52,474 and one Labour Party councillor was elected. The turnout was 55.8%. The councillor was elected for a four-year term, extended by an extra year by the Local Government (Interim Provisions) Act 1984, ahead of the abolition of the council.

1981 Greater London Council election: Fulham
Party	Candidate	Votes	%	±%
Labour	Barrington John Stead	13,304	45.38	
Conservative	John Charles Putnam	12,537	42.77	
Liberal	William George Wintle	2,625	8.96	
Ecology	Roger J. Coward	386	1.32	
National Front	Alistair J. S. Cameron	282	0.96	
Save London Action Group	Linda Hobbs	102	0.35	
Abolish the GLC	Colin R. Bex	68	0.23	
Turnout				
Labour gain from Conservative		Swing		
