= Forrest Fulton =

British judge and politician

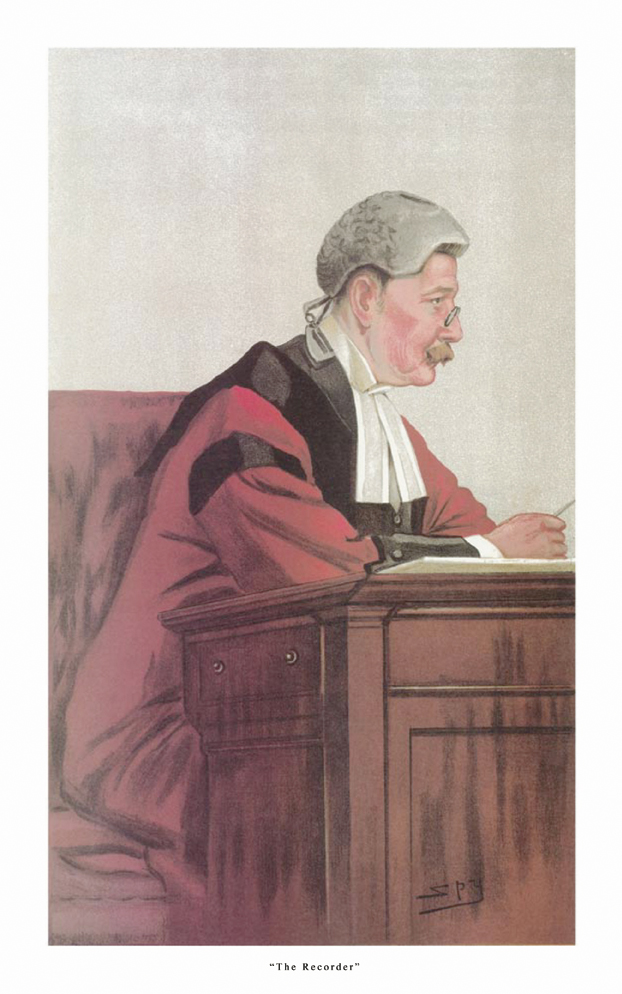
Sir Forrest Fulton by 'Spy' in Vanity Fair 9 July 1903

Sir James Forrest Fulton (12 July 1846 – 25 June 1926) was a British judge and Conservative politician.

== Early life ==
Born in Ostend, Belgium, he was the youngest son of Lieutenant-Colonel James Forrest Fulton and his wife, Fanny née Jessopp. Fulton was educated at Norwich School under his uncle, the Reverend Augustus Jessopp before attending the University of London. He graduated with a BA degree in 1867 and Bachelor of Laws degree in 1873.

== Legal career 1872–1886 ==
Fulton was called to the bar at the Middle Temple in 1872. Practising on the South Eastern Circuit, he held a number of senior legal posts including treasury counsel at the Middlesex Sessions, senior counsel to the Post Office and senior counsel to the Treasury at the Central Criminal Court.

== Member of parliament 1886–1892 ==
At the 1885 general election, Fulton was the Conservative Party's candidate to contest the newly created constituency of West Ham North. He was defeated by a margin of 719 votes. A further election was held in 1886, and Fulton stood at West Ham North again. He was elected to the Commons with a majority of 727 votes. He was described as having "made no particular mark" in parliament, and was unseated at the next general election in 1892, losing to the Liberal Party candidate, Archibald Grove, by 33 votes.

== Common Serjeant and Recorder of London 1892–1922 ==
On leaving parliament, he was appointed a Queen's Counsel, and was briefly Recorder of Maidstone. In August 1892 Sir William Charley resigned as Common Serjeant of London and Fulton was appointed his successor. He was knighted in the same year, and made a Lieutenant of the City of London, a Commissioner of the Central Criminal Court, and a Judge of the Mayor's Court of London. While Common Serjeant he presided over the case that led to the conviction of Adolph Beck for fraud in 1896. Eight years later an enquiry established that the conviction was a miscarriage of justice, a decision that led to the establishment of the Court of Criminal Appeal.

In March 1900 Sir Charles Hall, Recorder of London, died. Fulton was chosen to fill the post later the same month. He was succeeded as Common Serjeant of London by Frederick Albert Bosanquet QC. As Recorder Fulton tried the case of Kitty Byron, who was charged with the murder of Arthur Reginald Baker in 1902.

Fulton held the Recordership until March 1922, when he resigned due to ill health. He died at his home in Sheringham, Norfolk, in June 1925, aged 79.

== Bibliography ==
- Harries, R.; Cattermole, P.; Mackintosh, P. (1991). A History of Norwich School: King Edward VI's Grammar School at Norwich. Norwich: Friends of Norwich School. ISBN 978-0-9518561-1-6.

Parliament of the United Kingdom
Preceded by Edward Rider Cook	Member of Parliament for West Ham North; 1886 – 1892	Succeeded by Archibald Grove
