= Harold Baker (politician) =

British scholar and politician

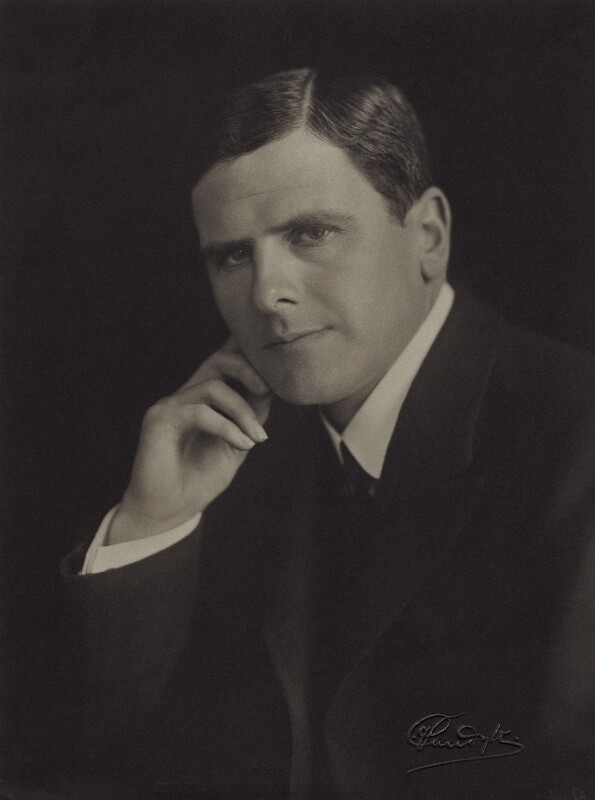
Baker in the 1920s

Harold Trevor Baker (22 January 1877 – 12 July 1960) was a British scholar, barrister, and Liberal politician.

== Early life ==
Baker was born on Portsea Island, the son of Louisa and Sir John Baker, MP for Portsmouth. He was educated at Winchester College and New College, Oxford. He received the Gaisford Prize in 1899. He was also a Craven Scholar, Hertford Scholar and an Eldon Scholar. He was President of the Oxford Union in the Michaelmas term of 1900.

== Career ==
Baker in 1910

Baker was Called to the Bar from the Inner Temple in 1903. He was Secretary to the Royal Commission on War Stores in South Africa.

Baker was elected to the House of Commons for Accrington in the January 1910 general election. He served in the Liberal administration of H. H. Asquith as Financial Secretary to the War Office from 1912 to 1914 and was admitted to the Privy Council in 1915. During the European War that broke out in 1914 he was a Member of His Majesty's Army Council, and in 1916 he became Inspector of Quartermaster-General Services.

Baker was one of the few Liberal MPs of his day who were opposed to granting the vote to women.

He was defeated at the 1918 general election, when he faced both a Labour opponent as well as a Coalition government backed Unionist. He tried to win his seat back in 1922 but finished third. He did not stand for parliament again.

While in parliament and out of it, Baker continued with his career as a barrister. In 1933 he became a Fellow of Winchester College and was its Warden from 1936 to 1946.

== Personal life ==
Baker never married. By his affair with Lady Gwendoline Bertie, the wife of Jack Churchill, he was the biological father of Clarissa Spencer-Churchill, wife of Prime Minister Anthony Eden.. He died in July of 1960 at age 83.

== Electoral record ==
General election January 1910: Accrington
Party	Candidate	Votes	%	±%
Liberal	Harold Baker	8,968	58.1	+1.3
Conservative	Albert Henry Jessel	6,455	41.9	n/a
Majority		2,513	16.2	−2.3
Turnout		15,423	94.6	+11.7
Registered electors		16,297		
Liberal hold		Swing	n/a	

General election December 1910: Accrington
Party	Candidate	Votes	%	±%
Liberal	Harold Baker	8,129	55.7	−2.4
Conservative	Ernest Gray	6,461	44.3	+2.4
Majority		1,668	11.4	−4.8
Turnout		14,590	89.5	−5.1
Registered electors		16,297		
Liberal hold		Swing	−2.4	

General election 14 December 1918: Accrington
Party		Candidate	Votes	%	±%
C	Unionist	Ernest Gray	13,808	47.2	+2.9
	Liberal	Harold Baker	8,378	28.6	−27.1
	Labour	Charles Roden Buxton	6,369	21.7	n/a
	National Democratic	William Hammond	738	2.5	n/a
Majority			5,430	18.6	30.0
Turnout			28,555	69.5	−20.0
	Unionist gain from Liberal		Swing	+15.0	
C indicates candidate endorsed by the coalition government.

General election 15 November 1922: Accrington
Party	Candidate	Votes	%	±%
Labour	Charles Roden Buxton	16,462	44.3	+22.6
Unionist	Ernest Gray	11,408	30.6	−16.6
Liberal	Harold Baker	9,395	25.1	−3.5
Majority		5,054	13.7	32.3
Turnout			88.7	+19.2
Labour gain from Unionist		Swing	+19.6	

Baker died in Winchester in July 1960, aged 83.

Parliament of the United Kingdom
Preceded by Sir Joseph Leese	Member of Parliament for Accrington; January 1910 – 1918	Succeeded by Ernest Gray
Political offices
Preceded by Harold Tennant	Financial Secretary to the War Office; 1912–1915	Succeeded by Henry Forster
