= Herbert Paton Holt =

English army officer and politician

Major Herbert Paton Holt MC

Member of Parliament for Upton
- In office 29 October 1924 – 10 May 1929
- Preceded by: Ben Gardner
- Succeeded by: Ben Gardner

Major Herbert Paton Holt, MC, (10 December 1890 – 1 June 1971) was a British-Canadian politician and army officer. He served as the Conservative Member of Parliament for Upton from 1924 to 1929.

== Early life and army service ==
Holt was born in Canada, the eldest son of Sir Herbert Samuel Holt, a prominent Canadian engineer and businessman. He was educated at St Albans School in England and then at the Royal Military College of Canada.

In 1910, he was commissioned in the British Army's 3rd Dragoon Guards, promoted to Lieutenant in September 1911, and served with his regiment during the First World War, during which time he was promoted to captain. He was awarded the Military Cross for "conspicuous gallantry and fine leadership of his squadron" under heavy fire, during which time he was severely wounded, in October 1918. He retired from the Army in 1920. He would later write a history of the regiment's service during the war.

== Political career ==
Holt was elected for Upton in Essex at the 1924 general election. This election showed a strong swing towards the Conservatives, and Holt took the seat from the Labour incumbent Benjamin Gardner with 54% of the vote; his position was greatly helped by the absence of a Liberal candidate.

He did not speak often in Parliament; his maiden speech in 1925 argued for supporting emigration schemes to the Dominions, and in 1926 he spoke in defence of traditional horsed cavalry, arguing against further reduction of the numbers of cavalry regiments: "in any circumstances, no matter where the next war may be – unless in the meantime there is a very great development of mechanical traction – it will be necessary to have as a nucleus of at least as many cavalry as we have now". In July 1926 he spoke on a local government bill which had arisen out of disputes in West Ham, his constituency area, quoting a number of cases which he argued showed fraud and corruption in the way relief payments were made, and claiming that the board of guardians was controlled by the "Soviet rule" of trades unions. His last major action was to introduce a private member's bill in early 1927 to prohibit "seditious and blasphemous teaching to children", targeting among others the Socialist Sunday School movement. This proceeded to a committee stage but did not progress to a third reading.

Holt does not appear to have spoken after 1927, and did not stand for reelection at the 1929 general election, when the seat was won back by Gardner.

== Later life and family ==
During the Second World War Holt returned to military service, as a major attached to the Pioneer Corps in the British Expeditionary Force. He returned from France in February 1940, and was invalided out of the service in September.

In the early 1920s, the Holts had lived at Jaggards House, near Corsham, Wiltshire. In 1927, Holt moved to Lackham House, near Lacock, Wiltshire, buying it for £78,000. In 1940, the estate was requisitioned for military use, later serving as a US Army headquarters, and following the war was sold to the county council for use as an agricultural college, now part of Wiltshire College. In 1935–36 he was appointed High Sheriff of Wiltshire.

He married Aileen Elizabeth Cains, of Montreal; they had one son and two daughters. Their son George was killed in action in Italy in November 1944, aged 21. One of their daughters, Elizabeth, married John Vavasseur Fisher, 3rd Baron Fisher.

Aileen Holt died in 1945, and the following year Holt remarried to Opal Eree M'Ilhenny, an American. He died on 1 June 1971; Opal Holt survived him and died in March 1980, aged 80.
