= West Ham North =

Parliamentary constituency in the United Kingdom, 1950–1974

- Former borough constituency for the House of Commons

1950–February 1974
- Seats: One
- Created from: Stratford and Upton
- Replaced by: Newham North West; Newham North East

1885–1918
- Seats: One
- Type of constituency: Borough constituency
- Created from: South Essex
- Replaced by: Stratford and Upton

West Ham North was a borough constituency in the County Borough of West Ham, in what was then Essex but is now Greater London. It returned one Member of Parliament (MP) to the House of Commons of the Parliament of the United Kingdom, elected by the first-past-the-post voting system.

== History ==
The constituency was created under the Redistribution of Seats Act 1885 for the 1885 general election, and abolished for the 1918 general election.

It was re-established for the 1950 general election, and abolished again for the February 1974 general election.

== Boundaries ==
=== 1885–1918 ===
The 1885 act created a new parliamentary borough of West Ham which was divided into two single-member divisions. West Ham, North Division consisted of the part of the Local Government District of West Ham north of a boundary formed by a number of railway lines and roads, described as follows:

From a point where the north side of the present London and Tilbury Railway crosses the west boundary of West Ham Parish; thence in a north-easterly direction along the north side of the said railway to a point where the east side of the present North Woolwich Branch of the Great Eastern Railway crosses it; thence in a northerly direction along the east side of the last-mentioned railway to a point opposite the centre of Abbey Road; thence in a north-easterly and easterly direction along the centres of Abbey Road, Church Street North, Portway, and Plashet Lane to the eastern boundary of West Ham Parish.

=== 1950–1974 ===
West Ham North Borough Constituency was created by the Representation of the People Act 1948, and was first contested at the 1950 general election. The seat was defined as consisting of eight wards of the County Borough of West Ham: Broadway, Forest Gate, High Street, Newtown, Park, Plashet Road, Upton and West Ham.

== Members of Parliament ==
=== MPs 1885–1918 ===
Election	Member	Party
1885	Edward Rider Cook	Liberal
1886	Forrest Fulton	Conservative
1892	Archibald Grove	Liberal
1895	Ernest Gray	Conservative
1906	Charles Masterman	Liberal
1911 by-election	Maurice de Forest	Liberal
1918	constituency abolished: see Stratford and Upton	

=== MPs 1950–1974 ===
Election	Member	Party
1950	constituency recreated	
1950	Arthur Lewis	Labour
Feb 1974	constituency abolished: see Newham North West and Newham North East	

== Elections ==
=== Elections in the 1880s ===
General election 1885: West Ham North
Party	Candidate	Votes	%	±%
Liberal	Edward Rider Cook	4,219	54.7	
Conservative	Forrest Fulton	3,500	45.3	
Majority		719	9.4	
Turnout		7,719	77.0	
Registered electors		10,026		
Liberal win (new seat)				

General election 1886: West Ham North
Party	Candidate	Votes	%	±%
Conservative	Forrest Fulton	3,920	55.1	+9.8
Liberal	Edward Rider Cook	3,193	44.9	−9.8
Majority		727	10.2	N/A
Turnout		7,114	70.9	−6.1
Registered electors		10,026		
Conservative gain from Liberal		Swing	+9.8	

=== Elections in the 1890s ===
Grove

General election 1892: West Ham North
Party	Candidate	Votes	%	±%
Liberal	Archibald Grove	4,976	50.2	+5.3
Conservative	Forrest Fulton	4,943	49.8	−5.3
Majority		33	0.4	N/A
Turnout		9,919	74.4	+3.5
Registered electors		13,334		
Liberal gain from Conservative		Swing	+5.3	

Ernest Gray

General election 1895: West Ham North
Party	Candidate	Votes	%	±%
Conservative	Ernest Gray	5,635	53.3	+3.5
Liberal	Archibald Grove	4,931	46.7	−3.5
Majority		704	6.6	N/A
Turnout		10,566	73.9	−0.5
Registered electors		14,294		
Conservative gain from Liberal		Swing	+3.5	

=== Elections in the 1900s ===
General election 1900: West Ham North
Party	Candidate	Votes	%	±%
Conservative	Ernest Gray	6,613	61.5	+8.2
Liberal	John Bethell	4,133	38.5	−8.2
Majority		2,480	23.0	+16.4
Turnout		10,746	67.8	−6.1
Registered electors		15,844		
Conservative hold		Swing	+8.2	

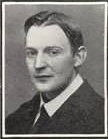
Masterman

General election 1906: West Ham North
Party	Candidate	Votes	%	±%
Liberal	Charles Masterman	6,838	57.3	+18.8
Conservative	Ernest Gray	5,094	42.7	−18.8
Majority		1,744	14.6	N/A
Turnout		11,932	79.0	+11.2
Registered electors		15,101		
Liberal gain from Conservative		Swing	+18.8	

=== Elections in the 1910s ===
General election January 1910: West Ham North
Party	Candidate	Votes	%	±%
Liberal	Charles Masterman	7,023	53.4	−3.9
Conservative	Ernest Gray	6,133	46.6	+3.9
Majority		890	6.8	−7.8
Turnout		13,156	84.0	+5.0
Registered electors		15,661		
Liberal hold		Swing	−3.9	

Wild

General election December 1910: West Ham North
Party	Candidate	Votes	%	±%
Liberal	Charles Masterman	6,657	53.6	+0.2
Conservative	Ernest Wild	5,760	46.4	−0.2
Majority		897	7.2	+0.4
Turnout		12,417	79.3	−4.7
Registered electors		15,661		
Liberal hold		Swing	+0.2	

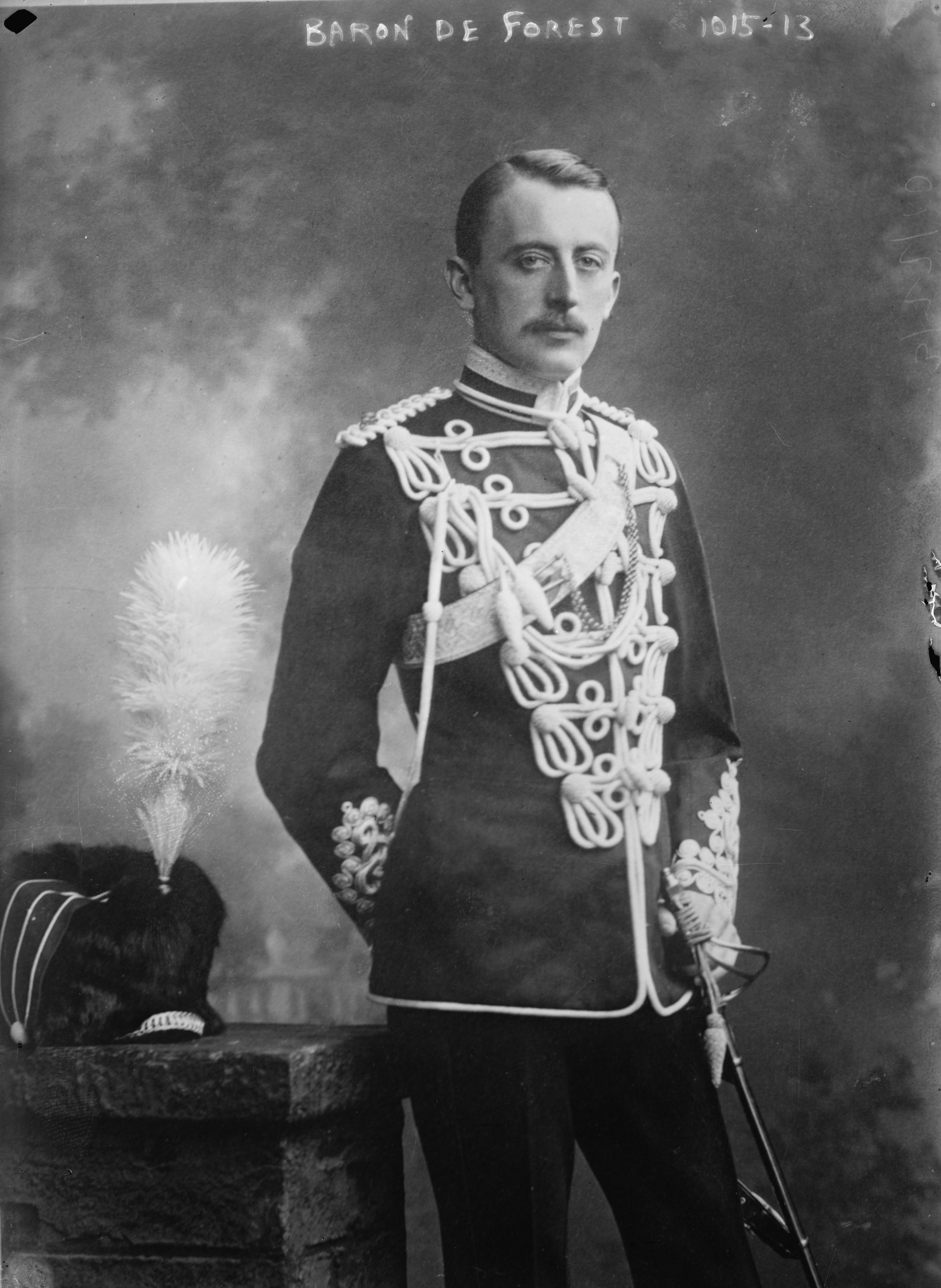
de Forest

1911 West Ham North by-election
Party	Candidate	Votes	%	±%
Liberal	Maurice de Forest	6,807	54.1	+0.5
Conservative	Ernest Wild	5,776	45.9	−0.5
Majority		1,031	8.2	+1.0
Turnout		12,583	76.2	−3.1
Liberal hold		Swing	+0.5	

General Election 1914–15:

A General Election was due to take place by the end of 1915. By the autumn of 1914, the following candidates had been adopted to contest that election.

- Liberal: Maurice de Forest
- Unionist: Ernest Wild

Due to the outbreak of war, the election never took place.

=== Elections in the 1950s ===
General election 1950: West Ham North
Party	Candidate	Votes	%	±%
Labour	Arthur Lewis	33,782	68.58	
Conservative	Redvers Prior	12,623	25.63	
Liberal	Richard Leslie Phillips	2,349	4.77	
Christian Democrat	G. W. Dickinson	503	1.02	
Majority		21,159	42.95	
Turnout		49,257	77.83	
Registered electors		63,288		
Labour win (new seat)				

General election 1951: West Ham North
Party	Candidate	Votes	%	±%
Labour	Arthur Lewis	34,156	70.45	+1.87
Conservative	James A. Erskine-Shaw	14,328	29.55	+3.92
Majority		19,828	40.90	−2.06
Turnout		48,484	76.57	−1.26
Registered electors		63,318		
Labour hold		Swing	-1.03	

General election 1955: West Ham North
Party	Candidate	Votes	%	±%
Labour	Arthur Lewis	27,249	65.89	−4.56
Conservative	Muriel Bowen	10,712	25.90	−3.65
Liberal	David John Howard Penwarden	3,393	8.20	New
Majority		16,537	39.99	−0.91
Turnout		41,354	67.41	−9.16
Registered electors		61,346		
Labour hold		Swing	-4.11	

General election 1959: West Ham North
Party	Candidate	Votes	%	±%
Labour	Arthur Lewis	24,096	59.2	−6.66
Conservative	J. Guy Jones	9,318	22.90	−3.00
Liberal	David S. Brooke	7,271	17.9	+9.67
Majority		14,778	43.99	+4.00
Turnout		40,685	70.36	+2.95
Registered electors		57,828		
Labour hold		Swing	-1.83	

=== Elections in the 1960s ===
General election 1964: West Ham North
Party	Candidate	Votes	%	±%
Labour	Arthur Lewis	21,228	60.52	−5.37
Liberal	Jean Pilkington	7,005	19.97	+11.77
Conservative	Christopher Brocklebank-Fowler	6,844	19.51	−3.39
Majority		14,223	40.55	−3.44
Turnout		35,077	62.83	−7.53
Registered electors		55,824		
Labour hold		Swing	-8.57	

General election 1966: West Ham North
Party	Candidate	Votes	%	±%
Labour	Arthur Lewis	21,778	65.62	+5.10
Liberal	Jean Pilkington	5,882	17.72	−2.25
Conservative	William J Shearman	5,527	16.65	−2.86
Majority		15,896	47.90	+7.35
Turnout		33,187	61.83	−1.00
Registered electors		53,672		
Labour hold		Swing	+3.68	

=== Elections in the 1970s ===
General election 1970: West Ham North
Party	Candidate	Votes	%	±%
Labour	Arthur Lewis	17,664	63.17	−2.45
Conservative	William J Shearman	7,130	25.50	+8.85
Liberal	Brian McCarthy	3,167	11.33	−6.39
Majority		10,534	37.67	−10.23
Turnout		27,961	50.32	−11.51
Registered electors		55,565		
Labour hold		Swing	-5.65	

== See also ==
- West Ham South, 1918–1950

== Sources ==
- Leigh Rayment's Historical List of MPs – Constituencies beginning with "W" (part 2)
