= Herbert Samuel Holt =

Irish-born Canadian civil engineer who became a businessman

Sir Herbert Holt
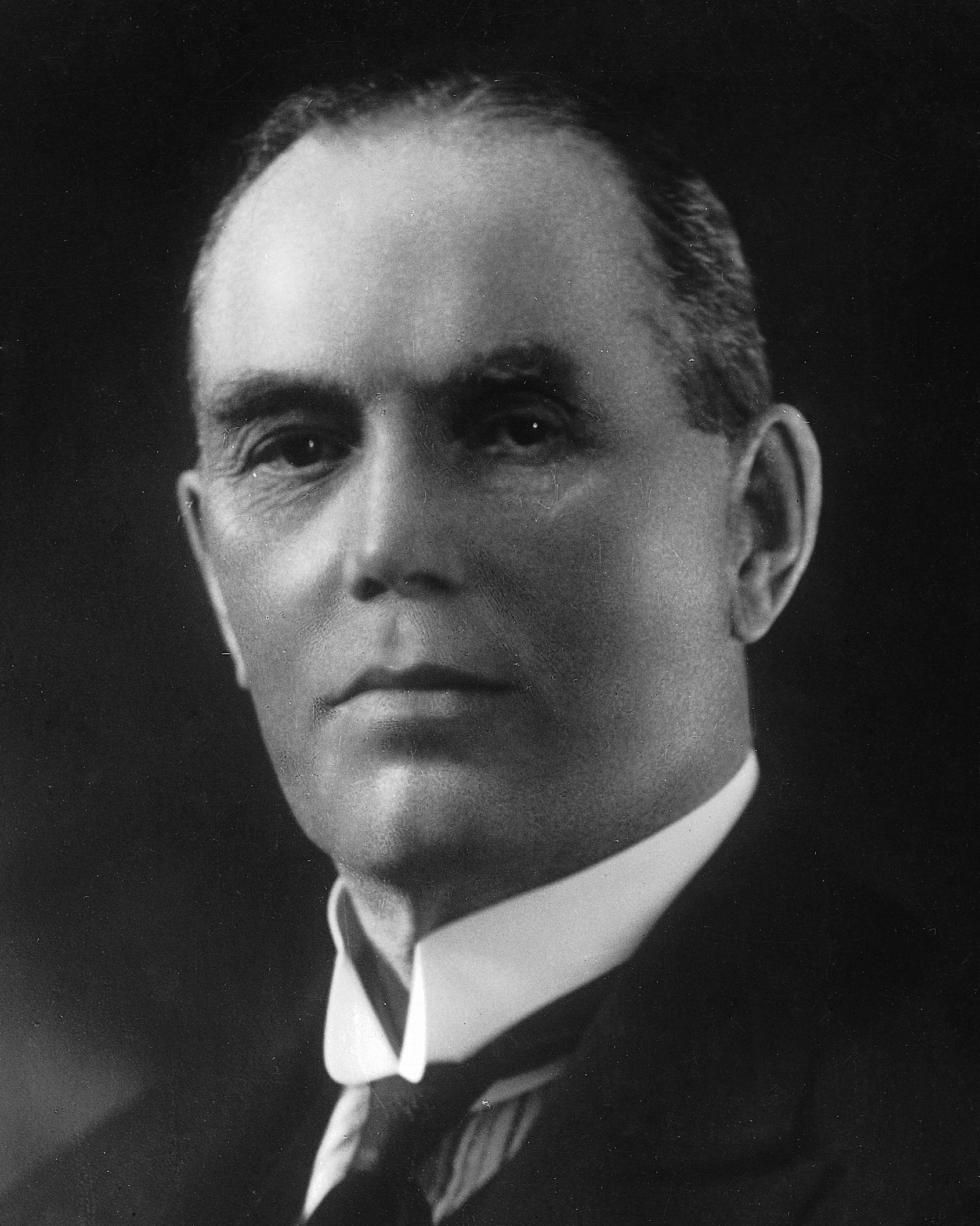
- Born: 12 February 1855; Geashill, County Offaly, Ireland
- Died: 28 September 1941 (aged 85); Montreal, Quebec
- Resting place: Mount Royal Cemetery
- Spouse: Jessie Paton (m. 1890)

Sir Herbert Samuel Holt (12 February 1855 – 28 September 1941) was an Anglo-Irish Canadian civil engineer who became a businessman, banker, and corporate director. He was President of the Royal Bank of Canada, Montreal Light, Heat & Power, and a director of some 250 companies worldwide, with assets valued at around $200 million. On his death, the Montreal Gazette described him as "the richest man in Canada", but he was also one of the most reviled. Among his peers in the Golden Square Mile, his ruthless business reputation ensured that "everyone respected his business ability, but nobody liked him personally". Holt was one of the founders of the Town of Hampstead, Quebec.

== Early life ==
Holt was born at Ballycrystal, near Geashill, County Offaly. He was the second son of William Robert Grattan Holt, of Carberry House, County Kildare, inherited in 1742 from his ancestor, Hannah Colley (afterwards Grattan) of Castle Carberry. Holt grew up with his family at another family property, Ballycrystal, a grazing farm of 291 acres. In reference to Holt's own ruthless business reputation, it is of interest to note that in a dispute between his father and his uncle, it was said that "the business affairs of William Holt's family would not stand up to close scrutiny." Herbert Holt's elder brother, Thomas Grattan Holt, succeeded to Ballycrystal and Carberry, while Holt studied civil engineering in Dublin. In 1873, he emigrated to Canada, beginning work as an assistant engineer with the Toronto Water Works. In the early 1880s, he was employed to survey and construct portions of the Canadian Pacific Railway across the Prairies and through the Rocky Mountains, under James Ross.

== Career ==
Herbert Holt became a pioneer developer of the energy business in the Province of Quebec and owned the Montreal Gas Company. In 1901 he merged Montreal Gas with Rodolphe Forget's Royal Electric Company to create the Montreal Light, Heat & Power Company (the company was later nationalized by the province and became part of Hydro-Québec). Holt served as president of the Royal Bank of Canada from 1908 to 1934 and the bank's chairman from 1934 until his death. He was a co-founder of the Ritz-Carlton Montreal, a director of Montreal Trust Company, Canada Car and Foundry and many other Canadian companies. He was appointed chairman of the Federal Plan Commission in 1913. In 1915, he was knighted by King George V. Herbert Samuel Holt died in 1941 and was interred in the Mount Royal Cemetery in Montreal. His comparatively modest home on Stanley Street, in Montreal's Golden Square Mile, was demolished after his death. His significant contribution to the Canadian economy was recognized by his election to the Canadian Business Hall of Fame after its formation in 1979.

== Reputation ==
Holt was also one of the richest and most reviled Montrealers of his time. When his death was announced at a baseball game in 1941, the crowd cheered. Holt was remembered for being a harsh banker who enjoyed large profits while the common man suffered during the Great Depression. In his own words, "If I am rich and powerful, while you are suffering the stranglehold of poverty and the humiliation of social assistance; if I was able, at the peak of the Depression, to make 150 per cent profits each year, it is foolishness on your part, and as for me, it is the fruit of a wise administration."

== Family ==
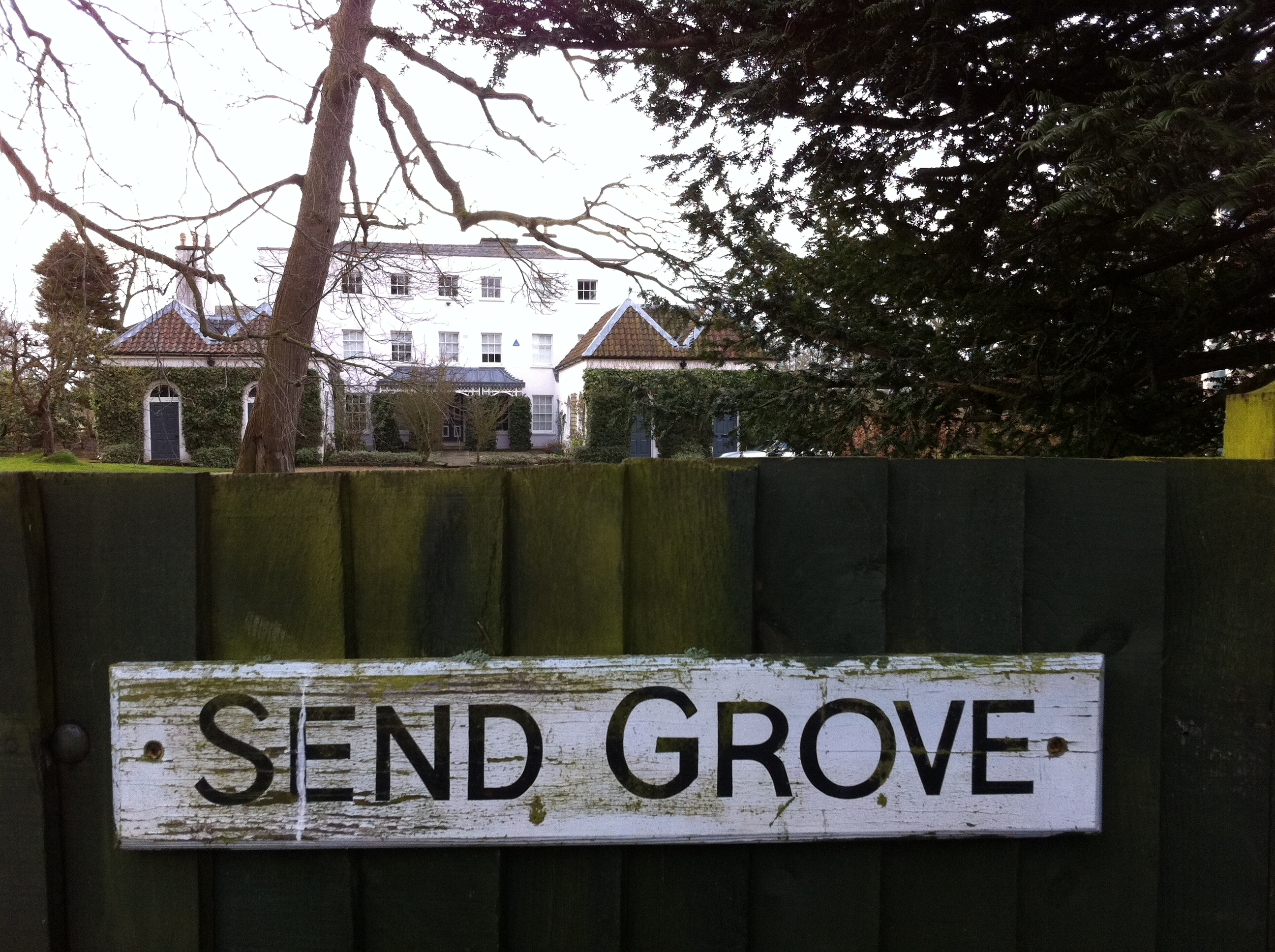
Send Grove, Holt's home in Surrey

In 1890, Holt married Jessie, the eldest daughter of Andrew Paton (1833-1892) of Sherbrooke, Quebec. The Holts kept three houses: one at 297 Stanley Street in Montreal's Golden Square Mile; another called Ballycrystal House, near Nassau in the Bahamas; and a third called Send Grove, near Woking in England. He also built a summer residence at 42 Summit Crescent in Westmount at the beginning of the 20th century. The Holts were the parents of three sons:

- Major Herbert Paton Holt (1890-1971) M.C., M.P., educated at the Royal Military College of Canada, he inherited Send Grove and Ballycrystal. He fought in both world wars and wrote a history of his regiment, the 3rd Dragoon Guards. He kept a house in Mayfair, London and in 1927 he purchased Lackham Manor, Wiltshire, for £78,000. He was High Sheriff of Wiltshire and Member of Parliament for Upton, Essex. He married Elizabeth, daughter of George Lighthall Cains of Montreal and his wife Amy, sister of Percy Cowans of Montreal. One of their two daughters, Elizabeth, is the widow of John Vavasseur Fisher, 3rd Baron Fisher. Their only son, Lt. George Herbert Holt, was killed in the Second World War.

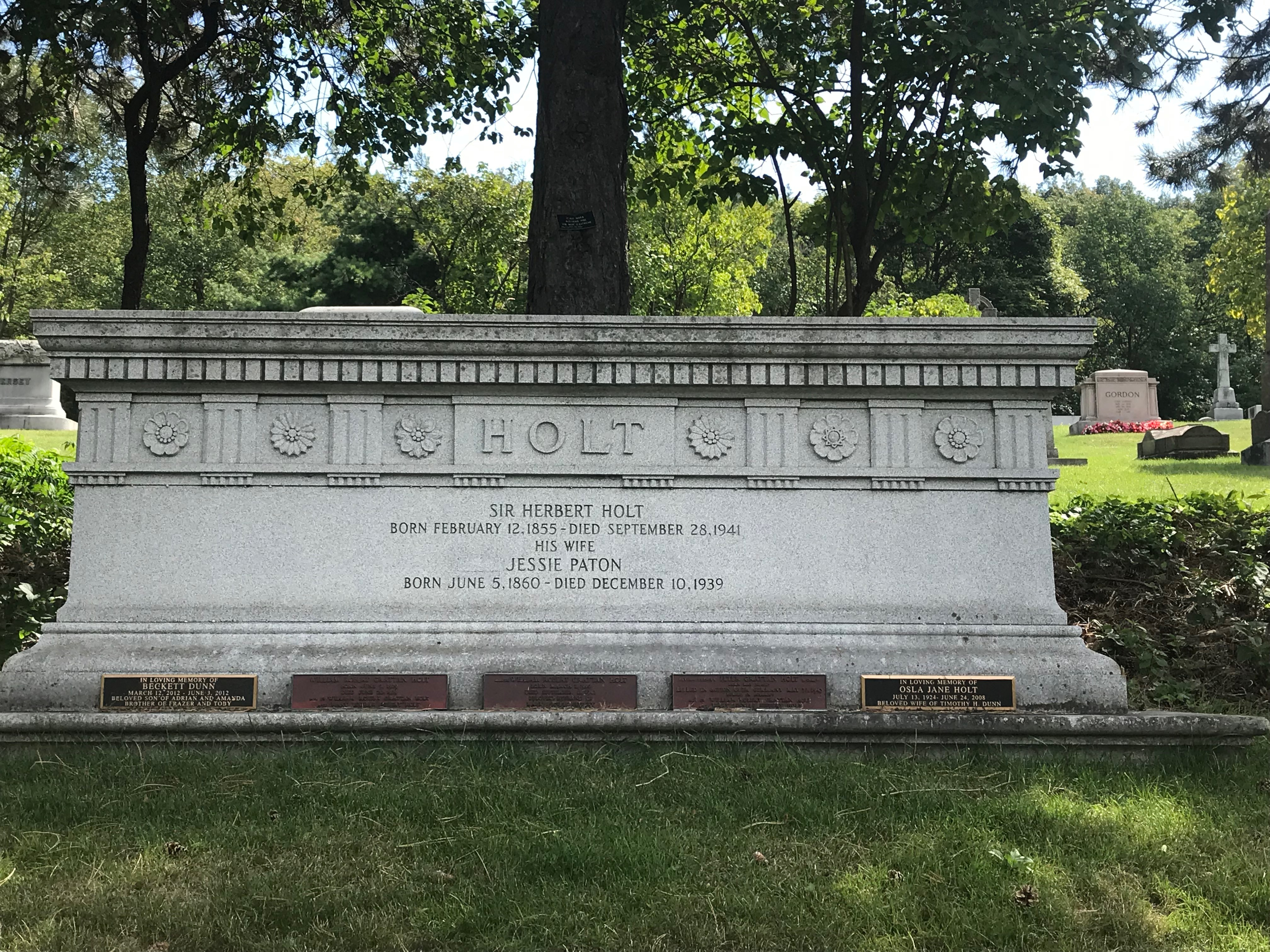
Herbert Holt's funeral monument in Mount Royal Cemetery, Montreal.

- Major Andrew Paton Holt (1893-1964), named for his maternal grandfather, he was educated at the Royal Military College of Canada. He successfully succeeded his father in many of his business ventures at Montreal. His friend, Lord Beaverbrook, unsuccessfully attempted to purchase him a knighthood. Major Andrew Holt died from a heart attack in London, England, on 12 September 1964.
- Major (William) Robert Grattan Holt (1900-1947), named for his paternal grandfather. He was educated at Marlborough College and the Royal Military College of Canada. In 1915, he survived the sinking of the RMS Lusitania. He served with the Royal Canadian Infantry Corps as a major during World War II. He lived at Redpath Crescent, in Montreal's Golden Square Mile, which he gave over to the Navy for use as a hospital during the Second World War. He was the father of one daughter, Jane, known popularly as Pam and afterwards as Pam Dunn (1924-2008). Pam became a famous philanthropist in Montreal who supported the Royal Victoria Hospital Foundation, Bishop's University, Bishop's College School, the Sun Youth Organization, Dans la rue, the Douglas Hospital, the Montreal Association for the Blind, the Butters Foundation and numerous other charities.

Holt, who was the father of three graduates of the Royal Military College of Canada, donated two hangars to the College in 1920 from the imperial war surplus stores in Canada. The hangars, which were free-freighted from Deseronto to Kingston, were erected as a covered skating rink.
