= 1934 Upton by-election =

UK Parliamentary by-election

The 1934 West Ham Upton by-election was held on 14 May 1934. The by-election was held due to the resignation of the incumbent Conservative MP, Alfred Chotzner. It was won by the Labour candidate Benjamin Walter Gardner.

== Result ==
Upton by-election, 1934
Party	Candidate	Votes	%	±%
Labour	Benjamin Walter Gardner	11,998	56.4	+14.9
Conservative	John Macnamara	8,534	40.1	−18.4
Ind. Labour Party	Fenner Brockway	748	3.5	New
Majority		3,464	16.3	N/A
Turnout		21,280	50.5	−19.9
Labour gain from Conservative		Swing	+17.0	

== Previous result ==
General election 1931: Upton
Party	Candidate	Votes	%	±%
Conservative	Alfred Chotzner	17,561	58.5	+26.2
Labour	Benjamin Walter Gardner	12,453	41.5	−7.5
Majority		5,108	17.0	N/A
Turnout		30,014	70.4	−0.4
Conservative gain from Labour		Swing		
