= Archibald Grove =

British politician

- Archibald Grove

Member of Parliament for West Ham North
- In office 1892–1895
- Preceded by: James Forrest Fulton
- Succeeded by: Ernest Gray

Member of Parliament for South Northamptonshire
- In office 1906–1910
- Preceded by: Edward Fitzroy
- Succeeded by: Edward Fitzroy

Thomas Newcomen Archibald Grove (1855 – 4 June 1920), commonly known as Archibald Grove, was a British magazine editor and Liberal Party politician.

== Early life ==
He was the second son of Captain Edward Grove and Elizabeth née Watts, following private education he attended Oriel College, Oxford, matriculating 21 January 1875, then later was entered as a student to the Inner Temple on 19 April 1883. He married Kate Sara (widow of Edmund Gurney) in 1889.

== The New Review ==
In 1889 Grove became the founding editor of the New Review. He launched the publication at the low price of sixpence, as he sought "to place within the reach of all a critical periodical of the first order". The Review was initially successful, with contributors such as Rider Haggard, Thomas Carlyle and Henry James, while some of Tennyson's poems first appeared there. However, by 1892 he had been forced to double the cover price, and was suffering competition from newer and illustrated periodicals such as The Strand Magazine, The Idler and the Pall Mall Gazette. At the end of 1894 he sold the magazine.

== Residences ==
In the 1890s Grove commissioned Edwin Lutyens to design his house, Berrydown Court, near Overton, Hampshire. In 1904 he bought 88 acres (36 ha) of land near Chalfont St Giles, Buckinghamshire. He again engaged Lutyens, but his design was not built due to Grove's financial difficulties. A more modest house, "Pollards Park" was constructed, where he lived until his death.

== Politics ==
Grove was a member of the Liberal Party, and unsuccessfully contested the constituency of Winchester in 1886. In 1891 he was chosen to contest West Ham North. When the general election was held in July 1892, Grove unseated the sitting Conservative Party MP, Forrest Fulton by the narrow margin of 33 votes. At the ensuing general election in 1895, he was defeated by Ernest Gray of the Conservative Party, who also had the support of the National Union of Teachers.

The next general election was called in 1900. Grove was unanimously chosen by the local Liberal Association to contest the constituency of South Northamptonshire. However, the "khaki" election was held at the height of the Second Boer War, which benefitted the Conservative candidate Edward Fitzroy, who won the seat.

He contested South Northamptonshire again at the 1906 general election. There was a swing to the Liberals, and Grove returned to the Commons. In September 1908, Grove announced that he would not be standing for election again due to ill health. He accordingly retired from politics at the January 1910 general election.

== After parliament ==
In 1916 Grove was a member of the executive committee of the Anglo-Russian Trade Bureau. He died in Weybridge, Surrey in June 1920.

Parliament of the United Kingdom
Preceded by James Forrest Fulton	Member of Parliament for West Ham North; 1892–1895	Succeeded by Ernest Gray
Preceded by Edward Fitzroy	Member of Parliament for South Northamptonshire; 1906–1910	Succeeded by Edward Fitzroy
