= Kenneth Francis =

British politician

Kenneth Francis (died 2011) was a British politician and a former leading member of the British National Party (BNP) in London. He was expelled from the party in 2002 because he had a foreign girlfriend.

Francis was the former BNP organiser for Newham in east London and had been a candidate for the BNP in the 1997 general election, securing 3.6% of the votes. His membership was withdrawn for living with teacher Annie Hernandez, an asylum seeker from Ecuador. The expulsion came despite party leaders, including chairman Nick Griffin and his then deputy Tony Lecomber, being regular guests at the couple's home. Hernandez also attended several party conferences.

Francis claimed that no one from the BNP criticised the relationship until November 2000 when he received a letter from Lecomber telling him he should leave the party. Francis said, "They had always made out that they didn't have a problem with her. Then they stabbed us in the backs." However, Lecomber told The Times that he and other BNP officials had disliked Francis's relationship with Hernandez, but had not been able to act because Francis had powerful supporters within the party; they had since been ousted. Lecomber said: "I didn't like it one bit. I used to put up with it on sufferance."

According to the Evening Standard, Francis's departure damaged the BNP in East London, the site of its first success in local elections in 1993 when Derek Beackon was elected as a councillor in Tower Hamlets. Under Francis' leadership, the area had the highest number of BNP candidates anywhere in Britain for the 1999 European Parliament elections. However, in March 2001, the BNP was beaten by the Christian Peoples Alliance in a by-election in the Beckton ward in Canning Town, leading the party to withdraw from the area.

On 21 June 2011, he died from cancer.

== Elections contested by Francis ==
UK Parliament

Date of election	Constituency	Party	Votes	%	Result
1997 general election	West Ham	BNP	1,198	3.6	4th of 6

European Parliament elections

Year	Region	Party	Votes	%	Result	Notes
1999	London	BNP	17,960	1.6	Not elected	Multi member constituencies; party list

London Assembly elections (Entire London city)

Date of election	Party	Votes	%	Result	Notes
2000	BNP	47,670	2.8	Not elected	Multi-members party list
