= Alfred Chotzner =

Alfred James Chotzner (28 March 1873 – 12 February 1958) was a British judge in colonial India and Conservative politician.

Alfred Chotzner was the son of Joseph Chotzner, a notable rabbi. Born in Belfast, he was educated at Harrow and St John's College, Cambridge, where he graduated BA in 1895 and won the Browne medal, and afterwards entered the Indian Civil Service, rising to become a High Court judge. In 1931 Chotzner was elected as a Member of Parliament for Upton, but resigned his seat in 1934. He retired to Hove in Sussex and died there in 1958.

== Bibliography ==
- Leigh Rayment's Historical List of MPs

Parliament of the United Kingdom
Preceded by Benjamin Walter Gardner	Member of Parliament for Upton; 1931 – 1934	Succeeded by Benjamin Walter Gardner
