= Ernest Gray =

British politician

Sir Ernest Gray
- Gray in 1895

Member of Parliament for West Ham North
- In office 1895–1906
- Preceded by: Archibald Grove
- Succeeded by: Charles Masterman

Member of Parliament for Accrington
- In office 1918–1922
- Preceded by: Harold Baker
- Succeeded by: Charles Buxton

Member of London County Council for Shoreditch (Haggerston)
- In office 2 March 1907 – 1910 Serving with Dr John Davies
- Preceded by: Constituency established
- Succeeded by: Benjamin B Evans; Joseph Stanley Holmes

Member of London County Council for Lambeth (Brixton)
- In office 5 March 1910 – 1925 Serving with William Haydon (1910-1919); Charles Henry Gibbs (1919-1922); Gervas Pierrepont (1922-1925)
- Preceded by: William Haydon; Samuel John Gurney Hoare
- Succeeded by: Gervas Pierrepont; Nigel Colman

Vice chairman of the London County Council
- In office 1915–1916
- Preceded by: Alfred Ordway Goodrich
- Succeeded by: William James Squires

Personal details
- Born: Ernest Gray; 27 August 1856
- Died: 6 May 1932 (aged 75) Hampstead, London
- Party: Conservative
- Spouse: Florence Caroline Garside
- Parent: William Gray (father)
- Education: St John's Training College

Military service
- Allegiance: United Kingdom
- Branch/service: British Army; Volunteer Force; Territorial Force
- Rank: Major
- Unit: Essex Regiment

Sir Ernest Gray (27 August 1856 – 6 May 1932) was a British educational reformer and Conservative politician.

== Early life and educational work ==
The son of William Gray, he attended primary school and St John's Training College, Battersea. On completion of his training, he worked as an elementary school teacher and science lecturer. He married Florence Caroline Garside in 1883. By 1894 he had become headmaster of St Gabriel's School, Pimlico. He was elected as president of the National Union of Teachers. He received an honorary degree from the University of Oxford in the same year. He later spent many years as secretary to the education committee of the union, and was joint editor of several education handbooks. He served as a member of the Consultative Committee of the Board of Education from 1900 to 1908. He was appointed an Officer de l’Instruction Publique by the French government for services to education. Gray held a commission in the Volunteer Force and the successor Territorial Force of the British Army, rising to the rank of major in the 6th Battalion, Essex Regiment.

== Politics ==
Politically, Gray was a Conservative, and in 1895 he was chosen by the party to contest the constituency of West Ham North. Gray had the full support of the National Union of Teachers, and was able to unseat the Liberal Member of Parliament, magazine publisher Archibald Grove. He retained the seat at the 1900 election, but was defeated in 1906. He made an unsuccessful attempt to regain the West Ham North seat in January 1910. At the next general election in December 1910 he contested the Lancashire seat of Accrington but failed to be elected.

In the meantime, Gray had been elected to the London County Council as a member of the Conservative-backed Municipal Reform Party. In 1907 the Municipal Reformers gained control of the council, and Gray was elected to represent Hoxton. At the next council elections in 1910 he became a councillor for Brixton, holding the seat until 1925. He was vice chairman of the council in 1915–1916.

He returned to parliament at the 1918 general election, having received the "coalition coupon", and was elected as Coalition Conservative member of parliament for Accrington. He was defeated at the next general election in 1922, when the seat was gained by the Labour Party.

== Later life ==
Gray retired from the London County Council in 1925, and was knighted for "political and public services" in the 1925 Birthday Honours. He died in Hampstead, aged 73, in May 1932 and was cremated at Golders Green.

Parliament of the United Kingdom
Preceded by Archibald Grove	Member of Parliament for West Ham North; 1895 – 1906	Succeeded by Charles Masterman
Preceded by Harold Baker	Member of Parliament for Accrington; 1918 – 1922	Succeeded by Charles Buxton
Trade union offices
Preceded by Charles Bowden	President of the National Union of Teachers; 1894	Succeeded by T. B. Ellery
