= Hammersmith (electoral division) =

Electoral division in Greater London, 1965–1973

- Former electoral division for the Greater London Council
- Hammersmith electoral division boundaries
- District: London Borough of Hammersmith
- Population: 192,810 (1969 estimate)
- Electorate: 140,651 (1964); 127,515 (1967); 125,806 (1970)
- Major settlements: Hammersmith, Fulham
- Area: 3,995.3 acres (16.168 km^{2})

Former electoral division
- Created: 1965
- Abolished: 1973
- Member(s): 3
- Replaced by: Hammersmith North and Fulham

Hammersmith was an electoral division for the purposes of elections to the Greater London Council. The constituency elected three councillors for a three-year term in 1964, 1967 and 1970.

== History ==
It was planned to use the same boundaries as the Westminster Parliament constituencies for election of councillors to the Greater London Council (GLC), as had been the practice for elections to the predecessor London County Council, but those that existed in 1965 crossed the Greater London boundary. Until new constituencies could be settled, the 32 London boroughs were used as electoral areas which therefore created a constituency called Hammersmith.

The electoral division was replaced from 1973 by the single-member electoral divisions of Hammersmith North and Fulham.

== Elections ==
The Hammersmith constituency was used for the Greater London Council elections in 1964, 1967 and 1970. Three councillors were elected at each election using first-past-the-post voting.

=== 1964 election ===
The first election was held on 9 April 1964, a year before the council came into its powers. The electorate was 140,651 and three Labour Party councillors were elected. With 60,573 people voting, the turnout was 43.1%. The councillors were elected for a three-year term.

1964 Greater London Council election: Hammersmith
Party	Candidate	Votes	%	±%
Labour	Richard Clive Edmonds	36,051		
Labour	Marjorie Eleanor McIntosh	35,406		
Labour	Jane Phillips	35,185		
Conservative	John Stewart Collins	21,135		
Conservative	Ann McVicker Forbes-Cockell	20,715		
Conservative	J. Graham	19,380		
Liberal	C. M. Hildred-Goode	2,055		
Liberal	D. Webb	1,966		
Liberal	F. C. Scrivener	1,892		
Communist	P. T. Robson	1,736		
Turnout				
Labour win (new seat)				
Labour win (new seat)				
Labour win (new seat)				

=== 1964 by-election ===
A by-election was held on 18 June 1964, following the death of Marjorie Eleanor McIntosh. One Labour Party councillor was elected unopposed.

Hammersmith by-election, 1964
Party	Candidate	Votes	%	±%
Labour	Iris Mary Caroline Bonham	unopposed		

=== 1967 election ===
The second election was held on 13 April 1967. The electorate was 127,515 and three Conservative Party councillors were elected. With 54,034 people voting, the turnout was 42.4%. The councillors were elected for a three-year term.

1967 Greater London Council election: Hammersmith
Party	Candidate	Votes	%	±%
Conservative	William Christopher Smith	25,279		
Conservative	Jeremy James Wagg	25,205		
Conservative	John Stewart Collins	25,180		
Labour	Richard Clive Edmonds	23,854		
Labour	Iris Mary Caroline Bonham	23,839		
Labour	Jane Phillips	23,612		
Liberal	S. H. J. A. Knott	2,765		
Liberal	E. R. Warren	2,377		
Liberal	R. W. Coghill	2,353		
Communist	P. T. Robson	1,463		
Union Movement	D. S. Anderson	896		
Turnout				
Conservative gain from Labour		Swing		
Conservative gain from Labour		Swing		
Conservative gain from Labour		Swing		

=== 1970 election ===
The third election was held on 27 April 1970. (Note: The general election of councillors took place on 9 April 1970 and was delayed in Hammersmith to 27 April 1970 because of the death of a candidate on 31 March 1970.) The electorate was 125,806 and three Labour Party councillors were elected. With 56,732 people voting, the turnout was 45.1%. The councillors were elected for a three-year term.

1970 Greater London Council election: Hammersmith
Party	Candidate	Votes	%	±%
Labour	Iris Mary Caroline Bonham	30,387		
Labour	Anthony Louis Banks	30,105		
Labour	Arthur George Edwards	29,660		
Conservative	A. P. Berend	23,512		
Conservative	P. G. Dwyer	22,948		
Conservative	William Christopher Smith	22,649		
Liberal	S. H. J. A. Knott	1,608		
Liberal	R. J. Groves	1,352		
Liberal	E. R. Warren	1,136		
Independent	M. P. Coney	854		
Communist	J. Gould	798		
Homes before Roads	B. H. Caddow	533		
Homes before Roads	H. M. Stubbs	408		
Homes before Roads	P. J. Hillson	399		
Union Movement	B. A. Wakefield	158		
Turnout				
Labour gain from Conservative		Swing		
Labour gain from Conservative		Swing		
Labour gain from Conservative		Swing		
