= 2012 Huntingdonshire District Council election =

2012 UK local government election

Map of the results of the 2012 Huntingdonshire District Council election. Conservatives in blue, Liberal Democrats in yellow, independents in light grey, UK Independence Party in purple and Labour in red. Wards in dark grey were not contested in 2012.

The 2012 Huntingdonshire District Council election took place on 3 May 2012 to elect members of Huntingdonshire District Council in Cambridgeshire, England. One third of the council was up for election and the Conservative Party stayed in overall control of the council.

After the election, the composition of the council was:

- Conservative 39
- Liberal Democrats 7
- UK Independence Party 3
- Independent 2
- Labour 1

== Background ==
Before the election the Conservatives controlled the council with 41 seats, compared to 8 for the Liberal Democrats, 2 UK Independence Party and 1 independent. 3 councillors stood down at the election, Conservatives Philip Swales of Ramsey ward and John Watt in Yaxley and Farcet, as well as Liberal Democrat Peter Ward in Warboys and Bury.

15 seats were contested with the Conservatives guaranteed to keep a majority on the council whatever happened. The Conservatives, Labour, Liberal Democrats and UK Independence Party contesting every seat except for in Sawtry where there was no Conservative candidate and Ramsey where the Liberal Democrats did not stand. There was one candidate from the Official Monster Raving Loony Party and a number of independents standing, including Dick Tuplin defending his seat in Sawtry, former Liberal Democrat Derek Giles in St Neots Eaton Socon and 2 candidates opposed to the westward expansion of St Ives.

== Election result ==
The Conservatives lost 3 seats and were run close in Godmanchester and The Hemingfords as well, but they kept a strong majority on the council. Labour, the UK Independence Party and an independent each took a seat from the Conservatives, but the Conservatives did gain a seat in Warboys and Bury from the Liberal Democrats.

The Labour gain came in Huntingdon North, where Patrick Kadewere defeated the chairman of the council Jeff Dutton. This gave Labour their first seat on the council since the 1999 election. Meanwhile, the UK Independence Party took a seat in Ramsey, giving the party all 3 councillors for the ward, with the party also getting an increased share of the vote across the council.

Independents polled strongly with former Liberal Democrat councillor Derek Giles getting back on the council as an independent after taking St Neots Eaton Socon from the Conservatives. Independent Dick Tuplin also held his seat in Sawtry with a majority of 818 votes, while other independents came close to taking seats.

The Liberal Democrats lost one of the three seats they had been defending and came last in many of the wards they had been contesting. However party leader Peter Downes held his seat in Brampton comfortably and the party held Huntingdon East from the Conservatives after a recount.

Huntingdonshire local election result 2012
Party	Seats	Gains	Losses	Net gain/loss	Seats %	Votes %	Votes	+/−
Conservative	9	1	3	-2	60.0	36.3	8,513	-18.8%
Liberal Democrats	2	0	1	-1	13.3	16.6	3,903	-5.0%
Independent	2	1	0	+1	13.3	13.8	3,232	+11.9%
UKIP	1	1	0	+1	6.7	19.6	4,611	+11.4%
Labour	1	1	0	+1	6.7	13.2	3,106	0.0%
Monster Raving Loony	0	0	0	0	0	0.5	118	+0.5%

== Ward results ==
Brampton
Party	Candidate	Votes	%	±%
Liberal Democrats	Peter Downes	1,196	60.6	+10.4
Conservative	Florendia Theodorou	462	23.4	−17.7
UKIP	Adrian Arnett	201	10.2	+10.2
Labour	Robert Pugh	116	5.9	−2.8
Majority		734	37.2	+28.1
Turnout		1,975	42.0	−11.4
Liberal Democrats hold		Swing		

Godmanchester
Party	Candidate	Votes	%	±%
Conservative	Elaine Kadic	468	28.3	−22.1
Liberal Democrats	David Underwood	455	27.5	−13.8
Independent	Nigel Pauley	445	26.9	+26.9
Labour	Ann Beevor	156	9.4	+1.1
UKIP	Robert Brown	130	7.9	+7.9
Majority		13	0.8	−8.4
Turnout		1,654	33.9	−36.5
Conservative hold		Swing		

Huntingdon East
Party	Candidate	Votes	%	±%
Liberal Democrats	Michael Shellens	823	36.9	+2.9
Conservative	Peter Brown	789	35.4	−13.6
UKIP	Derek Norman	336	15.1	+15.1
Labour	Marion Kadewere	282	12.6	−4.3
Majority		34	1.5	
Turnout		2,230	31.7	−11.3
Liberal Democrats hold		Swing		

Huntingdon North
Party	Candidate	Votes	%	±%
Labour	Patrick Kadewere	430	42.0	+11.5
Conservative	Jeffery Dutton	333	32.6	−1.5
UKIP	Peter Ashcroft	179	17.5	+1.5
Liberal Democrats	Patricia Shrapnel	81	7.9	−11.4
Majority		97	9.4	
Turnout		1,023	26.9	−3.5
Labour gain from Conservative		Swing		

Ramsey
Party	Candidate	Votes	%	±%
UKIP	Lisa Duffy	1,138	60.9	+7.8
Conservative	Brian Cunningham	565	30.2	−5.7
Labour	Susan Coomey	167	8.9	−2.0
Majority		573	30.6	+13.4
Turnout		1,870	29.2	−14.7
UKIP gain from Conservative		Swing		

Sawtry
Party	Candidate	Votes	%	±%
Independent	Richard Tuplin	1,049	75.5	+75.5
UKIP	Roger Henson	231	16.6	+7.7
Labour	Mary Howell	109	7.8	−1.4
Majority		818	58.9	
Turnout		1,389	28.5	−42.0
Independent hold		Swing		

Somersham
Party	Candidate	Votes	%	±%
Conservative	Stephen Criswell	871	58.7	−0.9
UKIP	Shirley Reeve	251	16.9	+7.1
Liberal Democrats	Anthony Jebson	181	12.2	−4.8
Labour	Graeme Watkins	180	12.1	−1.5
Majority		620	41.8	−0.9
Turnout		1,483	32.6	−13.7
Conservative hold		Swing		

St. Ives East
Party	Candidate	Votes	%	±%
Conservative	Jason Ablewhite	651	46.5	−1.7
UKIP	Paul Bullen	334	23.9	+13.0
Labour	Angela Richards	166	11.9	+0.1
Liberal Democrats	John Oliver	130	9.3	−19.8
Monster Raving Loony	Lord Toby Jug	118	8.4	+8.4
Majority		317	22.7	+3.6
Turnout		1,399	28.1	−33.5
Conservative hold		Swing		

St. Ives West
Party	Candidate	Votes	%	±%
Conservative	Ryan Fuller	294	33.9	−9.2
Independent	Heather Merryweather	201	23.2	+23.2
Liberal Democrats	David Hodge	180	20.8	−14.6
UKIP	Margaret King	129	14.9	−0.7
Labour	Richard Allen	62	7.2	+1.3
Majority		93	10.7	+3.0
Turnout		866	38.7	−10.3
Conservative hold		Swing		

St. Neots Eaton Ford
Party	Candidate	Votes	%	±%
Conservative	Rodney Farrer	895	56.9	−11.8
UKIP	Marian Appleton	254	16.1	+16.1
Labour	Nicholas Johnson	239	15.2	+15.2
Liberal Democrats	Nicholas Berry	185	11.8	−19.5
Majority		641	40.8	+3.5
Turnout		1,573	30.1	−13.6
Conservative hold		Swing		

St. Neots Eaton Socon
Party	Candidate	Votes	%	±%
Independent	Derek Giles	890	63.6	
Conservative	Andrew Jennings	288	20.6	
Labour	Patricia Nicholls	85	6.1	
UKIP	Jennifer O'Dell	84	6.0	
Liberal Democrats	Gordon Thorpe	53	3.8	
Majority		602	43.0	
Turnout		1,400	33.9	−3.3
Independent gain from Conservative		Swing		

St. Neots Eynesbury
Party	Candidate	Votes	%	±%
Conservative	Andrew Hansard	646	42.1	−3.1
Labour	William O'Connor	353	23.0	+0.2
UKIP	David Howard	319	20.8	+20.8
Liberal Democrats	Douglas Terry	218	14.2	−17.9
Majority		293	19.1	+6.0
Turnout		1,536	21.1	−11.8
Conservative hold		Swing		

The Hemingfords
Party	Candidate	Votes	%	±%
Conservative	Ian Bates	779	40.5	−22.2
Independent	Paul Boothman	647	33.6	+33.6
UKIP	Ian Percy	226	11.7	+4.0
Labour	John Watson	137	7.1	−3.6
Liberal Democrats	David Priestman	135	7.0	−11.9
Majority		132	6.9	−36.9
Turnout		1,924	39.7	−16.1
Conservative hold		Swing		

Warboys and Bury
Party	Candidate	Votes	%	±%
Conservative	John Pethard	612	46.3	−5.7
UKIP	Michael Tew	346	26.2	+14.1
Labour	Ian Ramsbottom	195	14.8	+5.9
Liberal Democrats	Anthony Hulme	169	12.8	−14.2
Majority		266	20.1	−4.9
Turnout		1,322	27.6	−41.8
Conservative gain from Liberal Democrats		Swing		

Yaxley and Farcet
Party	Candidate	Votes	%	±%
Conservative	Mark Oliver	860	46.8	−14.5
UKIP	John Hyland	453	24.6	+10.5
Labour	Margaret Cochrane	429	23.3	+5.1
Liberal Democrats	Christopher Waites	97	5.3	−1.1
Majority		407	22.1	−21.1
Turnout		1,839	23.0	−13.6
Conservative hold		Swing		

== By-elections between 2012 and 2014 ==
=== Earith ===
A by-election was held in Earith on 21 June 2012 after the death of Conservative councillor Philip Godfrey. The seat was held for the Conservatives by Robin Carter by a majority of 87 votes over the UK Independence Party.

Earith by-election 21 June 2012
Party	Candidate	Votes	%	±%
Conservative	Robin Carter	524	43.5	−18.2
UKIP	Alan Fitzgerald	437	36.3	+26.8
Labour	Iain Ramsbottom	96	8.0	−6.7
Liberal Democrats	Anthony Hulme	92	7.6	−6.5
Monster Raving Loony	Lord Toby Jug	56	4.6	+4.6
Majority		87	7.2	−39.8
Turnout		1,205	25.6	−22.7
Conservative hold		Swing		

=== Brampton ===
A by-election was held in Brampton on 2 May 2013 after Liberal Democrat councillor Peter Downes resigned from the council. The seat was held for the Liberal Democrats by John Morris with a majority of 349 votes over the Conservatives.

Brampton by-election 2 May 2013
Party	Candidate	Votes	%	±%
Liberal Democrats	John Morris	855	44.3	−16.3
Conservative	Jane King	506	26.2	+2.8
UKIP	Adrian Arnett	481	24.9	+14.7
Labour	Mark Johnson	90	4.7	−1.2
Majority		349	18.1	−19.1
Turnout		1,932	41.3	−0.7
Liberal Democrats hold		Swing		
