= Edward Rider Cook =

English soap manufacturer and politician

Edward Rider Cook (4 June 1836 – 21 August 1898) was an English soap manufacturer and Liberal politician who sat in the House of Commons from 1885 to 1886.

Cook was born at Whitechapel, the son of Edward Cook of Crix, Hatfield Peverel, Essex and his wife Anne Rider. He was educated at City of London School, and at University College, London, where he studied theoretical and analytical chemistry. He was senior partner in the firm of Edward Cook & Co., soap makers and chemical manufacturers of Bow. In 1865, he became a member for Poplar at the Metropolitan Board of Works. He was chairman of the unsuccessful London Riverside Fish Market Co. of Shadwell, Honorary Treasurer of Society of Chemical Industry and its President from 1890–91, and a Conservator of River Lea. He was also F.C.S., a J.P. for Middlesex and was described as an advanced Liberal.

He was elected at the 1885 general election as Member of Parliament (MP) for West Ham North, but lost the seat in the 1886 general election.

Cook married firstly Edith Piper in 1860, and secondly Ellen Leonard of Clifton, Bristol in 1873. He died of a cerebral hemorrhage at his residence, Woodford House, Woodford Green, Essex, in August 1898 aged 62.

Parliament of the United Kingdom
New constituency See South Essex	Member of Parliament for West Ham North; 1885 – 1886	Succeeded by James Forrest Fulton
