= Newham North West =

UK Parliament constituency (1974–1997)

- Former borough constituency for the House of Commons

February 1974–1997
- Seats: one
- Created from: West Ham North
- Replaced by: West Ham

Newham North West was a parliamentary constituency represented in the House of Commons of the Parliament of the United Kingdom, in the London Borough of Newham. It returned one Member of Parliament, elected by the first-past-the-post system.

== History ==
The constituency was created for the February 1974 general election, and abolished for the 1997 general election. It was then merged with part of the constituency of Newham South to form the new constituency of West Ham.

In 1971, 15.3% were non-White. In 1981, 32.7% of the constituency were non-White.

The constituency shared boundaries with the Newham North West electoral division for election of councillors to the Greater London Council at elections in 1973, 1977 and 1981.

== Boundaries ==
The London Borough of Newham wards of Forest Gate, New Town, Park, Plashet, Stratford, Upton, and West Ham.

== Members of Parliament ==
Election	Member	Party
Feb 1974	Arthur Lewis	Labour
1983	Tony Banks	Labour
1997	constituency abolished	

== Election results ==
=== Elections in the 1970s ===
General election February 1974: Newham North West
Party	Candidate	Votes	%	±%
Labour	Arthur Lewis	18,898	59.9	
Liberal	D.C. Bigg	6,350	20.1	
Conservative	David Atkinson	6,301	20.0	
Majority		12,548	39.8	
Turnout		31,549	59.3	
Labour win (new seat)				

General election October 1974: Newham North West
Party	Candidate	Votes	%	±%
Labour	Arthur Lewis	18,388	66.6	+6.7
Conservative	R. Brown	5,007	18.1	−1.9
Liberal	A. Hetherington	4,201	15.2	−4.9
Majority		13,381	48.5	+8.7
Turnout		27,596	51.6	−7.7
Labour hold		Swing	+4.3	

General election 1979: Newham North West
Party	Candidate	Votes	%	±%
Labour	Arthur Lewis	18,392	61.5	−5.1
Conservative	David Amess	7,937	26.5	+8.4
Liberal	Brian McCarthy	2,377	7.9	−7.3
National Front	Michael Maloney	1,217	4.1	New
Majority		10,455	35.0	−13.5
Turnout		29,923	55.4	+3.8
Labour hold		Swing	−6.8	

=== Elections in the 1980s ===
General election 1983: Newham North West
Party	Candidate	Votes	%	±%
Labour	Tony Banks	13,042	46.6	−14.9
Conservative	Keith D. Irons	6,124	21.9	−4.6
SDP	Alec Kellaway	5,204	18.6	+10.7
Independent Labour	Arthur Lewis	3,074	11.0	New
National Front	M. Hipperson	525	1.9	−2.2
Majority		6,918	24.7	−10.3
Turnout		27,969	56.2	+0.8
Labour hold		Swing	−5.2	

General election 1987: Newham North West
Party	Candidate	Votes	%	±%
Labour	Tony Banks	15,677	55.4	+8.8
Conservative	John Wylie	7,181	25.4	+3.5
SDP	Richard Redden	4,920	17.4	−1.2
Green	Varyah De Grandis-Harrison	497	1.8	New
Majority		8,496	30.0	+5.3
Turnout		28,275	59.4	+3.2
Labour hold		Swing	+2.7	

=== Elections in the 1990s ===
General election 1992: Newham North West
Party	Candidate	Votes	%	±%
Labour	Tony Banks	15,911	61.1	+5.7
Conservative	Mark Prisk	6,740	25.9	+0.5
Liberal Democrats	Andrew Sawdon	2,445	9.4	−8.0
Green	Amanda Sandford	587	2.3	+0.5
Raving Loony Green Giant	Lord Toby Jug	252	1.0	New
International Communist	David O'Sullivan	100	0.4	New
Majority		9,171	35.2	+5.2
Turnout		26,035	56.0	−3.4
Labour hold		Swing	+2.6	
