= Upton (constituency) =

Parliamentary constituency in the United Kingdom, 1918–1950

- Former borough constituency for the House of Commons
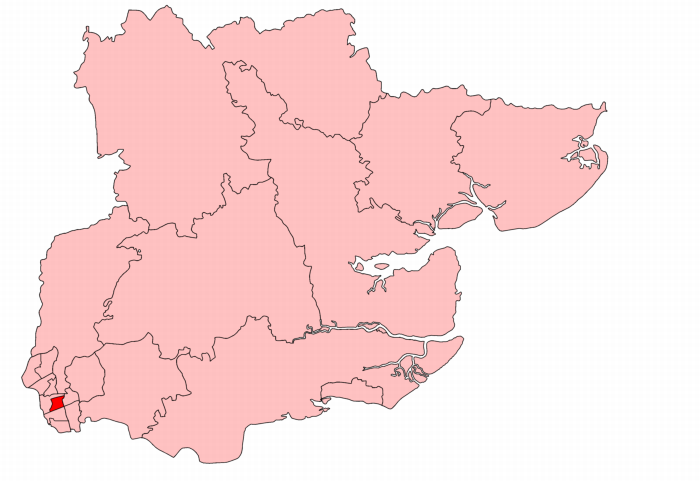
- Upton in Essex, showing boundaries used from 1918 to 1950.
- County: Essex

1918–1950
- Seats: One
- Created from: West Ham North
- Replaced by: West Ham North

Upton (strictly the Upton Division of West Ham) was a parliamentary constituency in the Borough of West Ham in the South-West of Essex (now East London), which returned one Member of Parliament (MP) to the House of Commons of the Parliament of the United Kingdom, elected by the first past the post voting system.

The constituency was created for the 1918 general election and abolished for the 1950 general election.

== Boundaries ==
The County Borough of West Ham wards of Park, Upton, and West Ham.

== Members of Parliament ==
| Election | Member | Party |
|---|---|---|
| 1918 | Sir Ernest Wild | Coalition Conservative |
| 1922 | David Margesson | Conservative |
| 1923 | Benjamin Walter Gardner | Labour |
| 1924 | Herbert Paton Holt | Conservative |
| 1929 | Benjamin Walter Gardner | Labour |
| 1931 | Alfred Chotzner | Conservative |
| 1934 by-election | Benjamin Walter Gardner | Labour |
| 1945 | Arthur Lewis | Labour |
| 1950 | constituency abolished | |

== Elections ==
=== Elections in the 1910s ===
General election 1918: Upton
| Party | | Candidate | Votes | % | ±% |
|---|---|---|---|---|---|
| C | Unionist | Ernest Wild | 8,813 | 61.2 | |
| | Labour | Benjamin Gardner | 3,186 | 22.2 | |
| | Liberal | John Charles Nicholson | 2,380 | 16.6 | |
| Majority | | | 5,627 | 39.0 | |
| Turnout | | | 14,379 | 46.8 | |
| | Unionist win (new seat) | | | | |
C indicates candidate endorsed by the coalition government.

=== Elections in the 1920s ===
General election 1922: Upton
| Party | Candidate | Votes | % | ±% |
|---|---|---|---|---|
| Unionist | David Margesson | 10,196 | 46.0 | −15.2 |
| Labour | Benjamin Gardner | 7,268 | 32.8 | +10.6 |
| Liberal | John Charles Nicholson | 4,692 | 21.2 | +4.6 |
| Majority | | 2,928 | 13.2 | −25.8 |
| Turnout | | 22,156 | 69.4 | +22.6 |
| Unionist hold | | Swing | | |

General election 1923: Upton
| Party | Candidate | Votes | % | ±% |
|---|---|---|---|---|
| Labour | Benjamin Gardner | 8,656 | 39.3 | +6.5 |
| Unionist | David Margesson | 7,630 | 34.7 | −11.3 |
| Liberal | John Charles Carroll | 5,710 | 26.0 | +4.8 |
| Majority | | 1,026 | 4.6 | N/A |
| Turnout | | 21,996 | 67.2 | −2.2 |
| Labour gain from Unionist | | Swing | +8.9 | |

General election 1924: Upton
| Party | Candidate | Votes | % | ±% |
|---|---|---|---|---|
| Unionist | Herbert Paton Holt | 13,410 | 54.0 | +19.3 |
| Labour | Benjamin Gardner | 11,443 | 46.0 | +6.7 |
| Majority | | 1,967 | 8.0 | N/A |
| Turnout | | 24,853 | 74.8 | +7.6 |
| Unionist gain from Labour | | Swing | | |

General election 1929: Upton
| Party | Candidate | Votes | % | ±% |
|---|---|---|---|---|
| Labour | Benjamin Gardner | 14,703 | 49.0 | +3.0 |
| Unionist | Morgan Morgan | 9,681 | 32.3 | −21.7 |
| Liberal | W. J. Austin | 5,607 | 18.7 | New |
| Majority | | 5,022 | 16.7 | +24.7 |
| Turnout | | 29,991 | 70.8 | −4.0 |
| Labour gain from Unionist | | Swing | +12.3 | |

=== Elections in the 1930s ===
General election 1931: Upton
| Party | Candidate | Votes | % | ±% |
|---|---|---|---|---|
| Conservative | Alfred Chotzner | 17,561 | 58.5 | +26.2 |
| Labour | Benjamin Gardner | 12,453 | 41.5 | −7.5 |
| Majority | | 5,108 | 17.0 | N/A |
| Turnout | | 30,014 | 70.4 | −0.4 |
| Conservative gain from Labour | | Swing | | |

1934 Upton by-election
| Party | Candidate | Votes | % | ±% |
|---|---|---|---|---|
| Labour | Benjamin Gardner | 11,998 | 56.4 | +14.9 |
| Conservative | John Macnamara | 8,534 | 40.1 | −18.4 |
| Ind. Labour Party | Fenner Brockway | 748 | 3.5 | New |
| Majority | | 3,464 | 16.3 | N/A |
| Turnout | | 21,280 | 50.5 | −19.9 |
| Labour gain from Conservative | | Swing | +17.0 | |

General election 1935: Upton
| Party | Candidate | Votes | % | ±% |
|---|---|---|---|---|
| Labour | Benjamin Gardner | 13,685 | 53.2 | −3.2 |
| Conservative | Stephen Riou Benson | 12,020 | 46.8 | +6.7 |
| Majority | | 1,665 | 6.4 | −9.9 |
| Turnout | | 25,705 | 62.7 | +12.2 |
| Labour hold | | Swing | | |

General Election 1939–40

Another General Election was required to take place before the end of 1940. The political parties had been making preparations for an election to take place and by the Autumn of 1939, the following candidates had been selected;

- Labour: D. Robert Rees
- Conservative:
- British Union: Arthur Beaven

=== Elections in the 1940s ===
General election 1945: Upton
| Party | Candidate | Votes | % | ±% |
|---|---|---|---|---|
| Labour | Arthur Lewis | 14,281 | 74.5 | +21.3 |
| Conservative | CK Collins | 4,885 | 25.5 | −21.3 |
| Majority | | 9,396 | 49.0 | +42.6 |
| Turnout | | 19,166 | 67.4 | +4.7 |
| Labour hold | | Swing | +21.3 | |

== Bibliography ==
- Craig, F. W. S. (1983) [1969]. British parliamentary election results 1918-1949 (3rd ed.). Chichester: Parliamentary Research Services. ISBN 0-900178-06-X.
- Leigh Rayment's Historical List of MPs – Constituencies beginning with "U"
