= Joseph Chotzner =

Irish rabbi

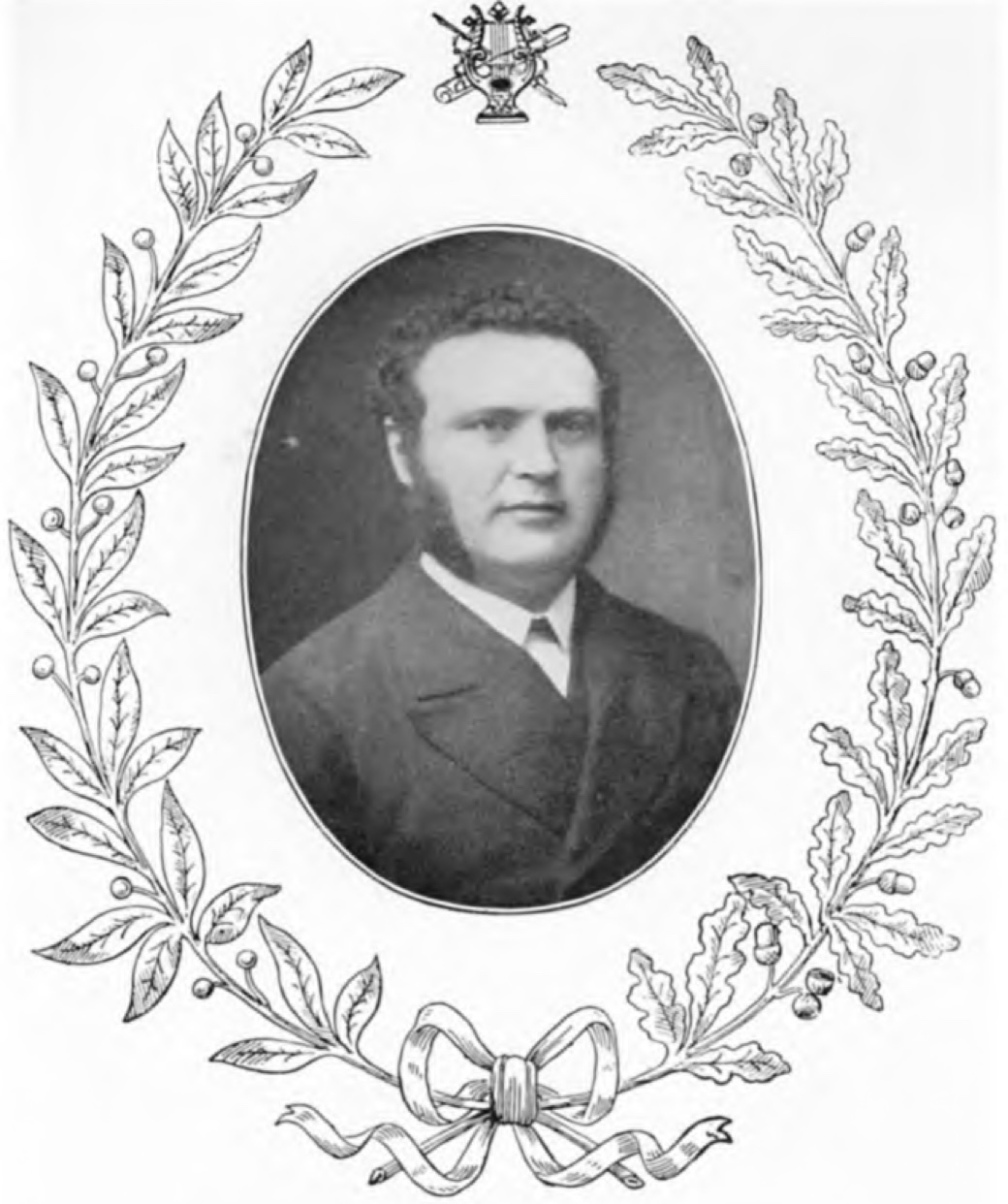
Joseph Chotzner

Joseph Chotzner (May 11, 1844 – 1914) was the first rabbi of the Jewish community in Belfast, United Kingdom. He served from 1870 to 1880 at the helm of the Belfast Synagogue.

== Biography ==
Chotzner was born in Kraków, Poland on May 11, 1844, and educated at the Breslau rabbinical seminary and the University of Breslau. After his ordination Chotzner became the first rabbi of the congregation at Belfast, Ireland, officiating from 1870 to 1880; and he again held the rabbinate there from 1892 to 1897. He also taught (1880–92) at Harrow School. From 1897 to 1905 he was a lecturer at Montefiore College, Ramsgate, established by Moses Montefiore.

Chotzner wrote "Lel Shimmurim" (The Night of Observances), a poetry collection, Breslau, 1864; "Modern Judaism" (1876), "Humor and Irony of the Hebrew Bible," 1883; the memoirs "Zikronot" (1885); and "Hebrew Humour and Other Essays" (1915).

Alfred James Chotzner, Joseph's son, became a High Court Judge in Calcutta and a Member of Parliament in the UK.

== See also ==
- History of the Jews in Northern Ireland
