= Tony Banks, Baron Stratford =

British politician (1942–2006)

The Right Honourable The Lord Stratford
- Official portrait, 2005

Minister for Sport
- In office 2 May 1997 – 20 October 1999
- Prime Minister: Tony Blair
- Preceded by: Iain Sproat
- Succeeded by: Kate Hoey

Member of the House of Lords
- Lord Temporal
- Life peerage 23 June 2005 – 8 January 2006

Member of Parliament for West Ham Newham North West (1983–1997)
- In office 9 June 1983 – 11 April 2005
- Preceded by: Arthur Lewis
- Succeeded by: Lyn Brown

Personal details
- Born: Anthony Louis Banks; 8 April 1942 Belfast, Northern Ireland
- Died: 8 January 2006 (aged 63) Fort Myers, Florida, US
- Party: Labour (after 1960s)
- Other political affiliations: Liberal (1960s)
- Spouse: Sally Jones
- Education: University of York; London School of Economics

Anthony Louis Banks, Baron Stratford (8 April 1942 – 8 January 2006) was a British politician who served as Minister for Sport from 1997 to 1999. A member of the Labour Party, he was a member of Parliament from 1983 to 2005 and subsequently as a member of the House of Lords. He was well known in the House of Commons for his acid tongue.

== Career before politics ==
Banks was born at the Jubilee Maternity Hospital, Belfast, the only son and elder child of Albert Herbert Banks, a sergeant in the Royal Army Service Corps who before the Second World War had been a toolmaker, and his wife, Olive Irene (Rene), née Rusca. The family returned to England after the birth, and he grew up in Brixton and Tooting. He was educated at St John's School, Brixton, and Tenison's School, Kennington. He failed his "O" Levels and left school to work as a clerk for a few years, but studied at night school to gain the qualifications necessary for university. From 1964 to 1967 he studied politics at the University of York, where he was President of the Student Representative Council. He graduated with an upper-second degree in 1967, then undertook further study at the London School of Economics.

Banks then became a trade union official, first for the Amalgamated Union of Engineering Workers, from 1969 to 1975, then as Assistant General Secretary of the Association of Broadcasting Staff, from 1976 to 1983 (it later merged with other unions to form the Broadcasting, Entertainment, Cinematograph and Theatre Union or BECTU). For several years Banks was responsible for freelancers.

== Political career ==
In 1964 Banks unsuccessfully stood for the Liberal Party in the first elections for the London Borough Councils that began operation in 1965. He later joined the Labour Party. He was a member of Lambeth Council from 1971 to 1974, and during the 1970s and 1980s he was a prominent member of the Greater London Council (GLC), representing Hammersmith (1970–1977) and Tooting (1981–1986). He was Chairman of the Greater London Council from 1985 until its abolition in 1986.

Having unsuccessfully contested East Grinstead in 1970, Newcastle upon Tyne North in October 1974 (by 469 votes), and Watford in 1979, Banks won Newham North West for Labour in 1983, defeating his predecessor, Arthur Lewis, who had been deselected as Labour's candidate. Following a boundary review in 1995, Newham North West was expanded and renamed West Ham for the general election in 1997. Banks retained the seat until 2005, when he stood down.

=== Ministerial post ===
After Labour's election victory in 1997 Banks was appointed Minister for Sport in the Department for Culture, Media and Sport. He called for foreign players in the English Premiership to become eligible to play for England: "Can you imagine seeing Cantona and Giggs swapping the Red of Manchester for the White of England?" He also suggested that the football teams of the four constituent parts of the UK should merge to compete in the Olympic Games, as eventually occurred in 2012. However his calling for one UK football team in 1997 was met with ridicule from supporters and one colleague, the Scottish Labour MP Sam Galbraith, stated that the creation of such a team would only happen "over his dead body". Banks also offended Scotland's supporters by describing the team as the "West Ham of world football - they never quite perform to their potential"

Among Banks's ministerial responsibilities were listed buildings, and he approved controversial additions including the 1930s Three Magpies pub in Birmingham and numerous redundant NHS buildings. He was also responsible for Grade I listing the Severn Bridge. He also controversially approved the demolition of the Twin Towers as part of the redevelopment of Wembley Stadium, dismissively referring to them as "concrete blocks".

After two years in office he stepped down to become the Prime Minister's envoy for England's bid to host the 2006 FIFA World Cup. The bid failed and Germany won instead. From then until his retirement from the Commons in 2005 Banks remained a backbencher, though he made a failed bid to become Labour's candidate in the election for Mayor of London in 2004.

=== Elections contested ===
==== Parliamentary elections ====
Date	Constituency	Party	Votes	% votes	Position	Ref.
1970 general election	East Grinstead	Labour	12,014	19.2	3rd of 3	
October 1974 general election	Newcastle upon Tyne North	Labour	10,748	41.1	2nd of 3	
1979 general election	Watford	Labour	18,030	40.28	2nd of 4	
1983 general election	Newham North West	Labour	13,042	46.6	Won	
1987 general election	Newham North West	Labour	15,677	55.4	Won	
1992 general election	Newham North West	Labour	15,911	61.1	Won	
1997 general election	West Ham	Labour	24,531	72.9	Won	
2001 general election	West Ham	Labour	20,449	69.9	Won	

==== Greater London Council elections ====
Date	Constituency	Party	Votes	% votes	Position	Ref.
1970	Hammersmith	Labour	30,105		Won	
1973	Fulham	Labour	15,176		Won	
1981	Tooting	Labour	12,127		Won	

== Political views ==
Banks was a vegetarian, a supporter of animal rights and a Vice-President of the League Against Cruel Sports. He was regarded as on the left of Labour, being a republican, an opponent of the 2003 invasion of Iraq and a member of the Socialist Campaign Group. His only speeches regarding the 2001 invasion of Afghanistan involved requests for government money and the help of the Royal Navy for the animals of the Kabul Zoo, particularly for Marjan, an elderly lion that needed air-conditioning for its rheumatism.

On 21 May 2004 Banks proposed an Early Day Motion in response to newspaper reports that MI5 had proposed using pigeons as flying bombs during the Second World War. The motion condemned the proposal, described human beings as "obscene, perverted, cruel, uncivilised and lethal", and proposed that the House "looks forward to the day when the inevitable asteroid slams into the Earth and wipes them out, thus giving nature the opportunity to start again".

Banks was also a supporter of the arts and chaired the House of Commons Works of Art Committee, which had responsibility for historic paintings and sculptures in the Palace of Westminster.

== Outspoken behaviour ==
In 1990, responding to a speech by the Conservative MP Terry Dicks opposing government funding for the arts, Banks said that Dicks was "living proof that a pig's bladder on a stick can get elected to Parliament". Banks also described another Conservative MP, Nicholas Soames, as "a one-man food mountain". Banks referred to Canadians as "dickheads" for culling seals.

During a question on Basildon's maternity services in 1994, Banks remarked that then Conservative MP for the area, David Amess had (as the father of five children) "put far too much pressure on Basildon's maternity services and suggested he use "a do-it-yourself vasectomy kit with two bricks."

At the Labour Party conference in 1997 Banks described William Hague, then Leader of the Conservative Party, as a "foetus", adding that Conservative MPs might be rethinking their views on abortion.

Banks crossed his fingers when he took the oath of allegiance to the Queen during a new session of Parliament. Banks said that he was wishing himself luck in his new job as Minister for Sport.

== Retirement ==
On 23 November 2004, Banks announced that he would not stand at the next general election. Three days later, in an interview with Robin Oakley on BBC Radio 4, he said "To be honest, I found it intellectually numbing and tedious in the extreme. I most certainly won't miss the constituency work. I've got to tell you that honestly. It's 22 years of the same cases, but just the faces and the people changing. It might sound a little disparaging to say this about people's lives and their problems, and we did deal with them, ... but I got no satisfaction from this at all. I really didn't. And all you were was a sort of high-powered social worker and perhaps not even a good one at that. I will miss being Chairman of the Works of Art Committee . . . because I was having so much intellectual enjoyment, and indeed just straightforward fun, out of reorganising our collection, and that kept me in touch with history".

On 24 March 2005 he made his final speech in the House of Commons. A week after the general election, on 13 May 2005, it was announced that he would be created a life peer, and on 23 June 2005 the peerage was gazetted as Baron Stratford, of Stratford in the London Borough of Newham.

== Personal life, death and legacy ==
In 1995, Banks befriended the American singer-songwriter Aimee Mann. The song "You're With Stupid Now" on her 1995 album I'm with Stupid was inspired by their discussions of British politics.

Banks was married to Sally Jones. He was a keen supporter of Chelsea F.C. and regularly attended matches. In 2003, when Roman Abramovich bought Chelsea FC, he expressed his disapproval, "We need to look at the source of his money, what his track record has been in Russia, to establish whether he is a fit and proper person to take over a football club in this country." He was a member of the British Humanist Association.

On 7 January 2006, Banks was reported to have collapsed two days earlier after suffering a massive stroke while having lunch on Sanibel Island in Florida, where he was on holiday. He was flown by helicopter to a hospital in Fort Myers and died on 8 January without regaining consciousness. The Prime Minister, Tony Blair, described him as "one of the most charismatic politicians in Britain, a true man of the people".

Banks's funeral was held on 21 January at the City of London Crematorium: John Prescott, Tessa Jowell, Margaret Beckett, Alastair Campbell, Tony Benn, Chris Smith and Richard Caborn attended. Banks's friend, former Conservative MP David Mellor, gave an address paying tribute. "A lord of misrule, a cheeky chappy, call him what you will—he can be defined but he cannot be replaced," said Mellor.

Following Banks's death, Lady Stratford vowed to continue his animal rights work, leading a campaign against the culling of seal pups in Canada. She is also a patron of the Captive Animals Protection Society, a charity campaigning for an end to the use of animals in circuses, zoos and the exotic pet trade.

== Arms ==
Coat of arms of Tony Banks, Baron Stratford

Adopted
2006
Coronet
Coronet of a Baron
Crest
A Fox sejant Gules supporting with the dexter forepaw a Crozier Or
Escutcheon
Or, three chevronels each terminating in three finials bottony Gules and each limb ensigned by a Pigeon volant outwards Sable
Supporters
On either side a Badger sejant erect proper armed and grasping in the interior forefoot a Hammer Or
Motto
ALL IS DUST
Badge
Within an Annulet set with finials bottony Gules a Badger's Face proper
Symbolism
The red chevronels on a gold field are taken from the arms of the Borough of Newham. To these have been added three finials bottony, suggesting the Saxon crown in the arms of the Greater London Council. The chevronels can also be taken as an allusion to the London roofline and are accompanied by diving London pigeons. The arms of Newham also feature a crozier, which has been combined with a fox in the crest. Lord Stratford had a particular interest in the 18th-century politician Charles James Fox.

Parliament of the United Kingdom
Preceded by Arthur Lewis	Member of Parliament for Newham North West; 1983–1997	Constituency abolished
New constituency	Member of Parliament for West Ham; 1997–2005	Succeeded by Lyn Brown
Political offices
Preceded by Iain Sproat	Minister for Sport; 1997–1999	Succeeded by Kate Hoey
Civic offices
Preceded by Illtyd Harrington	Chairman of the Greater London Council; 1985–1986	Council abolished
