= Ben Gardner (politician) =

British politician (1865–1948)

Benjamin Walter Gardner (1865 – 13 January 1948) was a Labour Party politician and Member of Parliament.

Born in Halstead, in Essex, Gardner became a socialist, and was a founding member of the West Ham Independent Labour Party. He contested Upton unsuccessfully at the general elections of 1918 and 1922. He won it in 1923, lost it in 1924, won it back in 1929, lost it in 1931, won it back at a by-election in 1934, and stood down in 1945.

A local councillor and alderman, Gardner served as Mayor of the County Borough of West Ham 1924 to 1925. On behalf of West Ham Borough Council, he was a member of the Metropolitan Water Board from 1934 to 1943.

Civic offices
Preceded by Jack Jones	Mayor of West Ham; 1924–1925	Succeeded by John Thompson Husband
