= Birmingham Edgbaston by-election =

Birmingham Edgbaston by-election may refer to one of three Parliamentary by-elections held for the British House of Commons constituency of Birmingham Edgbaston:

- 1940 Birmingham Edgbaston by-election
- 1953 Birmingham Edgbaston by-election

== See also ==
- Birmingham Edgbaston (UK Parliament constituency)
