= Candidates in the 2019 United Kingdom general election =

3,322 candidates stood in the 2019 general election, which was held on 12 December 2019. The deadline for parties and individuals to file candidate nomination papers to the acting returning officer (and the deadline for candidates to withdraw) was 16:00 on 14 November 2019.

== Gender ==
A record number of women took part, with 1,120 female candidates in total (34%). The election also saw the highest ever number of transgender and non-binary candidates, ten overall.

== Political parties ==
The Conservative Party put forward the most candidates, standing in 635 of the UK's 650 seats. The Labour Party contested 631, the Liberal Democrats 611, the various Green parties (Note: There are three separate but sister Green parties in the UK: the Green Party of England and Wales, Scottish Green Party and Green Party of Northern Ireland.) (a total of 497), and the Brexit Party 275. The total number of candidates by party is shown below:

Party	Candidates
Conservative and Unionist Party	635
Labour Party	631
Liberal Democrats	629
Green Party of England and Wales	472
Brexit Party	275
Independent	187
Scottish National Party	59
UKIP	44
Plaid Cymru	36
Yorkshire Party	28
Christian Peoples Alliance	27
Official Monster Raving Loony Party	24
Scottish Green Party	22
Social Democratic Party	20
Liberal Party	19
Alliance Party of Northern Ireland	18
Social Democratic & Labour Party	14
Democratic Unionist Party	17
Ulster Unionist Party	16
Sinn Féin	15
Aontú	7
Animal Welfare Party	6
Libertarian Party	5
Advance Together	5
Renew Party	4
English Democrats	4
Workers Revolutionary Party	4
Green Party Northern Ireland	3
Women's Equality Party	3
The Independent Group for Change	3
Gwlad Gwlad	3
The Justice & Anti-Corruption Party	3
Young People's Party	3
Alliance for Green Socialism	3
Socialist Equality Party	2
Scottish Family Party	2
Communities United Party	2
North East Party	2
People Before Profit	2
Christian Party	2
Socialist Party of Great Britain	2
Veterans and People's Party	2
Peace Party	2
Yeshua	2
British National Party	1
Mebyon Kernow	1
Putting Cumbria First	1
Scottish Libertarian Party	1
Speaker	1

=== Withdrawn or disowned candidates ===
The following candidates withdrew from campaigning or had support from their party withdrawn after the close of nominations and so will remain on the ballot paper in their constituency.

Candidate	Party	Constituency	Reason for withdrawal	Date
Safia Ali	Labour	Falkirk	Prior antisemitic posts on Facebook	28 November 2019
Amjad Bashir	Conservative	Leeds North East	Made antisemitic comments in 2014	20 November 2019
Sophie Cook	Independent	East Worthing and Shoreham	Reported experience of abuse and harassment	19 November 2019
Victor Farrell	Brexit Party	Glenrothes	Homophobic comments in 2017	18 November 2019
Neale Hanvey	SNP	Kirkcaldy and Cowdenbeath	Allegations of antisemitism in a 2016 Facebook post	28 November 2019
Ryan Houghton	Conservative	Aberdeen North	Antisemitic, Islamophobic and homophobic tweets in 2012	19 November 2019
Ivan Lewis	Independent	Bury South	Urged voters to vote Conservative	4 December 2019
Ben Mathis	Liberal Democrats	Hackney North and Stoke Newington	Offensive tweets up to 2018	24 November 2019
Waheed Rafiq	Liberal Democrats	Birmingham Hodge Hill	Antisemitic comments up to 2014	20 November 2019
Flora Scarabello	Conservative	Glasgow Central	Islamophobic comments	27 November 2019
Antony Calvert	Conservative	Wakefield	Racist and Sexist comments	10 November 2019
