= Lord Bennett =

Lord Bennett may refer to:

- R. B. Bennett, 1st Viscount Bennett (1870–1947), Prime Minister of Canada from 1930 to 1935
- Peter Bennett, 1st Baron Bennett of Edgbaston (1880–1957), British businessman and politician

== See also ==
- Natalie Bennett, Baroness Bennett of Manor Castle (born 1966), Australian-British politician and journalist
