= Daljit Singh Shergill =

Daljit Singh Shergill (Punjabi: ਦਲਜੀਤ ਸਿੰਘ ਸ਼ੇਰਗਿੱਲ, died 6 October 2014), known as Shergill Sahib, was a Sikh leader from Punjab, India, who was president of the first gurdwara in the UK. He immigrated to the West Midlands in the early 1960s. He became president of Guru Nanak Gurdwara Smethwick in 1984 and led the community for 20 years.

He died in Queen Elizabeth Hospital Birmingham on 6 October 2014, age 70.

His daughter Preet Gill became Britain's first female Sikh MP in 2017, when she won the election in the constituency of Birmingham Edgbaston. As of 2026, she serves as the Parliamentary Under-Secretary of State for Health Innovation and Safety.

== See also ==
- Sikhism in England
