= Home Affairs Select Committee =

UK House of Commons select committee

The Home Affairs Select Committee is a departmental select committee of the House of Commons in the Parliament of the United Kingdom.

== Remit ==
The Home Affairs Committee is one of the House of Commons select committees related to government departments: its terms of reference are to examine "the expenditure, administration, and policy of the Home Office and its associated public bodies".

The committee chooses its own subjects of inquiry, within the overall terms of reference. It invites written evidence from interested parties and holds public evidence sessions, usually in committee rooms at the House of Commons, although it does have the power to meet away from Westminster.

At the end of each inquiry, the committee will normally agree on a report based on the evidence received. Such reports are published and made available on the internet. Reports usually contain recommendations to the government and other bodies. By convention, the government responds to reports within about two months of publication. These responses are also published.

== Inquiries ==
Recent inquiries have included:

- Brexit-related preparations
- Counter-terrorism
- Domestic abuse
- Hate crime and its violent consequences
- Immigration detention
- Islamophobia
- Modern slavery
- Policing for the future
- Windrush children

== Chairs ==
Committee chairs include those listed below.

Name	Start	End	Party	Constituency
Graham Page	3 May 1979	13 November 1981	Conservative	Crosby
John Eden	13 November 1981	9 June 1983	Conservative	Bournemouth West
Edward Gardner	9 June 1983	15 May 1987	Conservative	Fylde
John Wheeler	June 1987	16 March 1992	Conservative	Westminster North
Ivan Lawrence	15 July 1992	21 March 1997	Conservative	Burton
Chris Mullin	16 July 1997	19 October 1999	Labour	Sunderland South
Robin Corbett	19 October 1999	11 May 2001	Labour	Birmingham Erdington
Chris Mullin	1 July 2001	14 July 2003	Labour	Sunderland South
John Denham	15 July 2003	25 July 2007	Labour	Southampton Itchen
Keith Vaz	26 July 2007	13 September 2016	Labour	Leicester East
Tim Loughton; Acting	13 September 2016	19 October 2016	Conservative	East Worthing and Shoreham
Yvette Cooper	19 October 2016	1 December 2021	Labour	Normanton, Pontefract and Castleford
Tim Loughton; Acting	1 December 2021	15 December 2021	Conservative	East Worthing and Shoreham
Diana Johnson	15 December 2021	30 May 2024	Labour	Kingston upon Hull North
Karen Bradley	11 September 2024	present	Conservative	Staffordshire Moorlands

=== Election results ===
From June 2010 chairs of select committees have been directly elected by a secret ballot of the whole House of Commons using the alternative vote system. Candidates with the fewest votes are eliminated and their votes redistributed until one remaining candidate has more than half of valid votes. Elections are held at the beginning of a parliament or in the event of a vacancy.

9 June 2010
Candidate	1st round	
Candidate	Votes	%
Keith Vaz	336	58.1
Alun Michael	242	41.9
Valid votes	578	

17 June 2015
Candidate	1st round	
Candidate	Votes	%
Keith Vaz	412	68.2
Fiona Mactaggart	192	31.8
Valid votes	604	

19 October 2016
Candidate	1st round		2nd round		3rd round	
Candidate	Votes	%	Votes	%	Votes	%
Yvette Cooper	216	39.9	235	45.4	281	58.9
Caroline Flint	149	27.5	161	31.1	196	31.2
Chuka Umunna	111	20.5	112	21.6	Eliminated	
Paul Flynn	65	12.0	Eliminated			
Not redistributed			23	4.3	64	11.8
Valid votes	541		518		477	

12 July 2017
Candidate	1st round	
Candidate	Votes	%
Yvette Cooper	Unopposed	
Valid votes	N/A	

30 January 2020
Candidate	1st round	
Candidate	Votes	%
Yvette Cooper	Unopposed	
Valid votes	N/A	

15 December 2021
Candidate	1st round		2nd round	
Candidate	Votes	%	Votes	%
Dame Diana Johnson	145	45.6	154	53.8
Dr Rupa Huq	96	30.5	132	46.2
Yasmin Qureshi	74	23.5	Eliminated	
Valid votes	315		286	

11 September 2024
Candidate	1st round	
Candidate	Votes	%
Karen Bradley	294	54.4
David Mundell	246	45.6
Valid votes	540	

== Membership ==
Membership of the committee is as follows:

Member	Party	Constituency
Karen Bradley MP (chair)	Conservative	Staffordshire Moorlands
Lewis Atkinson MP	Labour	Sunderland Central
Matt Bishop MP	Labour	Forest of Dean
Preet Kaur Gill MP	Labour	Birmingham Edgbaston
Paul Kohler MP	Liberal Democrats	Wimbledon
Ben Maguire MP	Liberal Democrats	North Cornwall
Robbie Moore MP	Conservative	Keighley and Ilkley
Margaret Mullane MP	Labour	Dagenham and Rainham
Peter Prinsley MP	Labour	Bury St Edmunds and Stowmarket
Joani Reid MP	Labour	East Kilbride and Strathaven
Bell Ribeiro-Addy MP	Labour	Clapham and Brixton Hill

=== Changes since 2024 ===
Date	Outgoing Member & Party	Constituency	→	New Member & Party	Constituency	Source
27 October 2025	Jake Richards MP (Labour)	Rother Valley	→	Lewis Atkinson MP (Labour)	Sunderland Central	Hansard
27 October 2025	Shaun Davies MP (Labour)	Telford	→	Peter Prinsley MP (Labour)	Bury St Edmunds and Stowmarket	Hansard
27 October 2025	Connor Rand MP (Labour)	Altrincham and Sale West	→	Jo White MP (Labour)	Bassetlaw	Hansard
26 October 2026	Chris Murray MP (Labour)	Edinburgh East and Musselburgh	→	Matt Bishop MP (Labour)	Forest of Dean	Hansard
26 October 2026	Jo White MP (Labour)	Bassetlaw	→	Preet Kaur Gill MP (Labour)	Birmingham Edgbaston	Hansard

== 2019–2024 Parliament ==
The chair was elected on 27 January 2020, with the members of the committee being announced on 2 March 2020.

Member	Party	Constituency
Yvette Cooper (chair)	Labour	Normanton, Pontefract and Castleford
Janet Daby	Labour	Lewisham East
Dehenna Davison	Conservative	Bishop Auckland
Stephen Doughty	Labour and Co-op	Cardiff South and Penarth
Ruth Edwards	Conservative	Rushcliffe
Laura Farris	Conservative	Newbury
Simon Fell	Conservative	Barrow and Furness
Adam Holloway	Conservative	Gravesham
Tim Loughton	Conservative	East Worthing and Shoreham
Holly Lynch	Labour	Halifax
Stuart McDonald	Scottish National Party	Cumbernauld, Kilsyth and Kirkintilloch East

=== Changes 2019-2024 ===
Date	Outgoing member	Constituency	→	New member	Constituency	Source
11 May 2020	Janet Daby (Labour)	Lewisham East	→	Diane Abbott (Labour)	Hackney North and Stoke Newington	
11 May 2020	Holly Lynch (Labour)	Halifax	→	Andrew Gwynne (Labour)	Denton and Reddish	
11 May 2020	Stephen Doughty (Labour and Co-op)	Cardiff South and Penarth	→	Diana Johnson (Labour)	Kingston upon Hull North	
2 November 2021	Dehenna Davison (Conservative)	Bishop Auckland	→	James Daly (Conservative)	Bury North	
2 November 2021	Ruth Edwards (Conservative)	Rushcliffe	→	Gary Sambrook (Conservative)	Birmingham Northfield	
1 December 2021	Yvette Cooper (chair, Labour)	Normanton, Pontefract and Castleford	→	Vacant		
15 December 2021	Diana Johnson (Labour)	Kingston upon Hull North	→	Vacant		
15 December 2021	Vacant		→	Diana Johnson (chair, Labour)	Kingston upon Hull North	
8 February 2022	Vacant		→	Paula Barker (Labour)	Liverpool Wavertree	
7 March 2022	Andrew Gwynne (Labour)	Denton and Reddish	→	Carolyn Harris (Labour)	Swansea East	
15 March 2022	James Daly (Conservative)	Bury North	→	Lee Anderson (Conservative)	Ashfield	
15 March 2022	Laura Farris (Conservative)	Newbury	→	Matt Vickers (Conservative)	Stockton South	
27 June 2022	Matt Vickers (Conservative)	Stockton South	→	James Daly (Conservative)	Bury North	
9 January 2023	Gary Sambrook (Conservative)	Birmingham Northfield	→	Marco Longhi (Conservative)	Dudley North	
28 March 2023	Stuart McDonald (Scottish National Party)	Cumbernauld, Kilsyth and Kirkintilloch East	→	Alison Thewliss (Scottish National Party)	Glasgow Central	
27 November 2023	Paula Barker (Labour)	Liverpool Wavertree	→	Kim Johnson (Labour)	Liverpool Riverside	
14 May 2024	Lee Anderson (Reform UK)	Ashfield	→	Brendan Clarke-Smith (Conservative)	Bassetlaw	

== 2017–2019 Parliament ==
The chair was elected on 12 July 2017, with the members of the committee being announced on 11 September 2017.

Member	Party	Constituency
Yvette Cooper (chair)	Labour	Normanton, Pontefract and Castleford
Christopher Chope	Conservative	Christchurch
Stephen Doughty	Labour and Co-op	Cardiff South and Penarth
Preet Gill	Labour and Co-op	Birmingham Edgbaston
Sarah Jones	Labour	Croydon Central
Tim Loughton	Conservative	East Worthing and Shoreham
Stuart McDonald	Scottish National Party	Cumbernauld, Kilsyth and Kirkintilloch East
Esther McVey	Conservative	Tatton
Will Quince	Conservative	Colchester
Naz Shah	Labour	Bradford West

=== Changes 2017–2019 ===
Date	Outgoing member	Constituency	→	New member	Constituency	Source
16 October 2017	New seat		→	Rehman Chishti (Conservative)	Gillingham and Rainham	Hansard
4 December 2017	Esther McVey (Conservative)	Tatton	→	Douglas Ross (Conservative)	Moray	Hansard
5 February 2018	Preet Gill (Labour)	Birmingham Edgbaston	→	John Woodcock (Labour)	Barrow and Furness	Hansard
20 February 2018	Will Quince (Conservative)	Colchester	→	Kirstene Hair (Conservative)	Angus	Hansard
18 June 2018	Sarah Jones (Labour)	Croydon Central	→	Alex Norris (Labour and Co-op)	Nottingham North	Hansard
23 July 2018	Naz Shah (Labour)	Bradford West	→	Kate Green (Labour)	Stretford and Urmston	Hansard
26 November 2018	Kirstene Hair (Conservative)	Angus	→	Chris Green (Conservative)	Bolton West	Hansard
8 May 2019	Alex Norris (Labour and Co-op)	Nottingham North	→	Janet Daby (Labour)	Lewisham East	Hansard
8 May 2019	John Woodcock (Independent)	Barrow and Furness	→	Toby Perkins (Labour)	Chesterfield	Hansard

== 2015–2017 Parliament ==
The chair was elected on 18 June 2015, with members being announced on 8 July 2015.

Member	Party	Constituency
Keith Vaz (chair)	Labour	Leicester East
Victoria Atkins	Conservative	Louth and Horncastle
James Berry	Conservative	Kingston and Surbiton
David Burrowes	Conservative	Enfield Southgate
Nus Ghani	Conservative	Wealden
Ranil Jayawardena	Conservative	North East Hampshire
Tim Loughton	Conservative	East Worthing and Shoreham
Stuart McDonald	Scottish National Party	Cumbernauld, Kilsyth and Kirkintilloch East
Keir Starmer	Labour	Holborn and St Pancras
Anna Turley	Labour and Co-op	Redcar
David Winnick	Labour	Walsall North

=== Changes 2015–2017 ===
Date	Outgoing member	Constituency	→	New member	Constituency	Source
26 October 2015	Anna Turley (Labour)	Redcar	→	Naz Shah Labour)	Bradford West	Hansard
26 October 2015	Keir Starmer (Labour)	Holborn and St Pancras	→	Chuka Umunna (Labour)	Streatham	Hansard
6 September 2016	Keith Vaz (chair, Labour)	Leicester East	→	Vacant		Hansard
19 October 2016	Vacant		→	Yvette Cooper (chair, Labour)	Normanton, Pontefract and Castleford	Hansard
31 October 2016	Victoria Atkins (Conservative)	Louth and Horncastle	→	Byron Davies Conservative)	Gower	Hansard

== 2010–2015 Parliament ==
The chair was elected on 10 June 2010, with members being announced on 12 July 2010.

Member	Party	Constituency
Keith Vaz (chair)	Labour	Leicester East
Nicola Blackwood	Conservative	Oxford West and Abingdon
Aidan Burley	Conservative	Cannock Chase
Lorraine Fullbrook	Conservative	South Ribble
Dr Julian Huppert	Liberal Democrats	Cambridge
Steve McCabe	Labour	Birmingham Selly Oak
Mary Macleod	Conservative	Brentford and Isleworth
Alun Michael	Labour and Co-op	Cardiff South and Penarth
Bridget Phillipson	Labour	Houghton and Sunderland South
Mark Reckless	Conservative	Rochester and Strood
David Winnick	Labour	Walsall North

=== Changes 2010–2015 ===
Date	Outgoing member	Constituency	→	New member	Constituency	Source
2 November 2010	Mary Macleod (Conservative)	Brentford and Isleworth	→	James Clappison (Conservative)	Hertsmere	Hansard
14 February 2011	Aidan Burley (Conservative)	Cannock Chase	→	Michael Ellis (Conservative)	Northampton North	Hansard
22 October 2012	Alun Michael (Labour and Co-op)	Cardiff South and Penarth	→	Vacant		Resignation of member from Parliament
26 November 2012	Vacant		→	Karl Turner (Labour)	Kingston upon Hull East	Hansard
4 February 2013	Karl Turner (Labour)	Kingston upon Hull East	→	Chris Ruane (Labour)	Vale of Clwyd	Hansard
4 November 2013	Steve McCabe (Labour)	Birmingham Selly Oak	→	Ian Austin (Labour)	Dudley North	Hansard
4 November 2013	Bridget Phillipson (Labour)	Houghton and Sunderland South	→	Paul Flynn (Labour)	Newport West	Hansard
4 November 2013	Chris Ruane (Labour)	Vale of Clwyd	→	Yasmin Qureshi (Labour)	Bolton South East	Hansard
30 September 2014	Mark Reckless (UKIP)	Rochester and Strood	→	Vacant		Resignation of member from Parliament
3 November 2014	Vacant		→	Tim Loughton (Conservative)	East Worthing and Shoreham	Hansard

== Changes ==
Occasionally, the House of Commons orders changes to be made in terms of membership of select committees, as proposed by the Committee of Selection. Such changes are shown below.

Date	Outgoing member	→	New member	Source
4 December 2017	Esther McVey (Con)	→	Douglas Ross (Con)	Hansard
5 February 2018	Preet Gill (Lab)	→	John Woodcock (Lab)	Hansard
20 February 2018	Will Quince (Con)	→	Kirstene Hair (Con)	Hansard
8 May 2019	Alex Norris (Lab Co-op)	→	Janet Daby (Lab)	Hansard
8 May 2019	John Woodcock (Ind)	→	Toby Perkins (Lab)	Hansard

== See also ==
- Parliamentary committees of the United Kingdom
