= Bournville College =

Location
- 1 Longbridge Lane; Birmingham, West Midlands, B31 2AJ; England

Information
- Type: Further Education College
- Department for Education URN: 130459 Tables
- Ofsted: Reports
- Principal: Mike
- Gender: Mixed
- Age: 16++
- Governing body: Corporation of South and City College Birmingham
- Website: www.sccb.ac.uk

Bournville College is a further education college based in Longbridge, Birmingham, England. The college offers courses that include A Levels, BTECs, NVQs, apprenticeships, and bespoke qualifications.

== History ==
The college was established in 1913 by George Cadbury to cater for education for the local population that included the workforce of the nearby Cadbury chocolate and confectionery factory, and was named Bournville College from 1949. In 1972, the college was relocated to Bristol Road (52.42914°N 1.95266°W), into premises that had been part of City of Birmingham Polytechnic. Further expansion took place during the 1970s, and in 2011, the college occupied its new purpose-built campus in Longbridge with a capacity for 15,000 students and 4.2 acres of grounds on the site of the former MG Rover automobile factory that closed in 2005. In 2014, the college announced it would open a training centre in India as part of plans to strengthen ties between Britain and India. As Bournville already have an office in Kolkata, they plan to open the £500,000 centre in the same city.

In 2015, the college created controversy when it purchased Manchester United season tickets before cutting more than 100 jobs, held a £170,000 centenary event, a £35,000 staff party, and paid consultants £2.8m over three years.

In August 2017, Bournville College merged with South and City College Birmingham. Though two separate colleges merged to create one single college, Bournville College has still kept its original name. The college has a total of six campuses, in Digbeth, Longbridge, Bordesley Green, Handsworth, Small Heath, and Hall Green.

== Notable former pupils ==
- Preet Gill, Member of Parliament for Birmingham Edgbaston

== See also ==
- College website
- Ofsted
