= Jill Knight =

British politician (1923–2022)

The Right Honourable The Baroness Knight of Collingtree DBE
- Knight in 1990

Member of the House of Lords
- Lord Temporal
- Life peerage 23 September 1997 – 24 March 2016

Member of Parliament for Birmingham Edgbaston
- In office 31 March 1966 – 8 April 1997
- Preceded by: Edith Pitt
- Succeeded by: Gisela Stuart

Personal details
- Born: Joan Christabel Jill Christie; 9 July 1923 Bristol, England
- Died: 6 April 2022 (aged 98) Northampton, England
- Party: Conservative
- Spouse: James Montague Knight (m. 1947; died 1986)
- Children: 2

Joan Christabel Jill Knight, Baroness Knight of Collingtree, DBE (née Christie; 9 July 1923 – 6 April 2022) was a British politician. A member of the Conservative Party, she served as Member of Parliament (MP) for Birmingham Edgbaston from 1966 to 1997. She was created a life peer as Baroness Knight of Collingtree, of Collingtree in the County of Northamptonshire, in 1997 after she had stood down at that year's general election, and retired from the House of Lords in 2016.

== Early life ==
Joan Christabel Jill Christie was born in Bristol on 9 July 1923, although she later shaved several years off her age: when seeking election, she put her year of birth as 1930. Her parents divorced when she was a child. Her mother was a teacher and a graduate of Bristol University. Christie attended Fairfield Secondary and Higher Grade School in Bristol and the King Edward Grammar School for Girls, Birmingham. In 1941, she joined the Women's Auxiliary Air Force (WAAF). Her unit served in Amiens, moving later to Hamburg, following the British advance, performing ground control of aircraft. She also appeared on British Forces Network radio.

Upon her return to the UK, she joined the Young Conservatives in London. On 14 June 1947, she married James Montague "Monty" Knight (an optician, who had served in the war as a lieutenant in the Royal Navy), and moved to Northampton.

== Political career ==
She was elected as a councillor on Northampton Borough Council, serving from 1956 to 1966, and became a whip. She unsuccessfully contested the parliamentary seat of Northampton at the 1959 and 1964 general elections for the Conservative Party. She was elected Member of Parliament (MP) for Birmingham Edgbaston in the 1966 general election, and held that seat in successive elections for 31 years until she stood down at the 1997 election. She was one of the longest serving female MPs in British history. The Conservative MP for Edgbaston, Dame Edith Pitt, had died on 27 January 1966 and it was the first time that a female Member of Parliament had been succeeded by another woman.

Knight was a member of the Parliamentary Select Committee on Race Relations and Immigration, 1969–72. For more than two decades she was an active member of the Conservative Monday Club and was an outspoken opponent of the Irish Republican Army. Following the February 1972 Aldershot bombing by the IRA she called for legislation to outlaw the IRA, and attacked its supporters and sympathisers.

She was on the Select Committee for the Council of Europe from 1977, the Select Committee for Home Affairs from 1980 to 1983, Lady Chairman of the Lords and Commons All-Party Child and Family Protection Group from 1978, on the Conservative Back-bench Health and Social Services Committee from 1982 and Secretary to the 1922 Committee from 1983 to 1987. Knight was President of the West Midlands Conservative Political Centre from 1980 to 1983, and Lady Chairman of the Western European Union Relations with Parliaments Committee from 1984 to 1988. She also served on the Council of Europe (1977–88), and as Chairman of the British Inter-Parliamentary Union (1994–97).

One slogan in the aftermath of the New Cross house fire, which left 13 young Black Britons dead, read: "Dame Jill Knight Set The Fire Alight!"; this was an apparent reference to a controversial speech by Knight which was widely interpreted as condoning or even encouraging direct action against noisy parties.

Knight was created a Life peer as Baroness Knight of Collingtree, of Collingtree in the County of Northamptonshire in 1997 after standing down at that year's general election, and retired from the House of Lords on 24 March 2016, the week of the 50th anniversary of her first election to Parliament. She was Vice-Chairman of the Association of Conservative Peers from 2002 to 2005.

Her memoirs, About the House, were published in 1995. She was interviewed in 2012 as part of The History of Parliament's oral history project.

=== Section 28 ===
Knight, along with David Wilshire, introduced the Section 28 amendment to the Local Government Act 1988, which barred local authorities, including schools, from 'promoting' homosexuality. While promoting the new clause, Knight claimed children under two had access to gay and lesbian books in Lambeth, a claim which has never been substantiated. She linked discussion of homosexuality in schools to the spread of AIDS, also describing homosexuality as "perverted" and "desperately dangerous". She was described as a key force behind the legislation and a "dedicated – not to say fanatical – anti-gay MP".

In June 2013, Knight opposed same-sex marriage legislation, arguing that Parliament cannot change the fact that "marriage is not about just love. It is about a man and a woman, themselves created to produce children, producing children. A man can no more bear a child, than a woman can produce sperm, and no law on earth can change that. This is not a homophobic view. It may be sad, it may be unequal, but it's true." In the same year, she claimed it was wrong for the Conservative Prime Minister David Cameron to apologise for the legacy of Section 28, while appearing to defend herself from accusations of homophobia by claiming that gay people are "very good at antiques".

In 2018, when she was interviewed by former Attitude magazine editor Matthew Todd, who confronted Knight about her role as an architect of and a main driving force behind Section 28, she said "I'm sorry if anything I did upset you. All I was trying to do was acting on what people wrote to me, said to me, what the papers said." Knight stated that her motivation had only been to maintain the welfare of children.

== Outside Parliament ==
From 1986 to 1995, Knight was Vice-President of Townswomen's Guilds. She was director of Computeach International plc from 1991 to 2006 and Heckett Multiserv from 1999 to 2006. Knight has been President of Sulgrave Manor Trust since 2012; she was its Chairman from 2007 to 2012.

== Honours ==
Knight was appointed a Member of the Order of the British Empire (MBE) in 1964, and elevated to a Dame Commander in 1985. She was awarded an honorary DSc by Aston University in 1999. Knight was made a Kentucky Colonel in 1973; a Nebraska Admiral in 1980; and was made an honorary Texas Ranger in 2014.

== Personal life and death ==
Knight's husband, James Montague Knight, died in 1986. The couple had two children. Her recreations were music, reading, tapestry work, theatre-going and antique-hunting. Knight died at a nursing home in Collingtree Park, Northampton, on 6 April 2022, at the age of 98.

== Arms ==
Coat of arms of Jill Knight

Escutcheon
Argent an oak tree eradicated Azure fructed Or within a mascle Azure thereon four needles in lozenge Argent each enfilled and entwined by a thread Or the ends thereof knotted in chief and in base.
Supporters
On either side a lynx Azure gorged with a plain collar attached thereto a chain reflexed over the back.

== Sources ==
- Phillips, Melanie (1980). The Divided House. London: Jonathan Cape Sidgwick & Jackson. ISBN 9780283985478.
- Copping, Robert. The Monday Club - Crisis and After, Current Affairs Information Service, Ilford, Essex, May 1976, pp. 5, 9, 16–18, 21-22
- Dod's Parliamentary Companion 1973, 160th edition, Epsom: Sell's Publications Ltd.
- Dod's Parliamentary Companion 1990, 171st edition, London ISBN 9780905702162
- Knight, Jill. About the House. Churchill Press, 1995; ISBN 0-902782-29-0
- Who's Who, London: A. & C. Black (various editions) ISBN 0-7136-5158-X

Parliament of the United Kingdom
| Preceded by Edith Pitt | Member of Parliament for Birmingham Edgbaston; 1966–1997 | Succeeded by Gisela Stuart |
