= 1997 Prime Minister's Resignation Honours =

British government recognitions

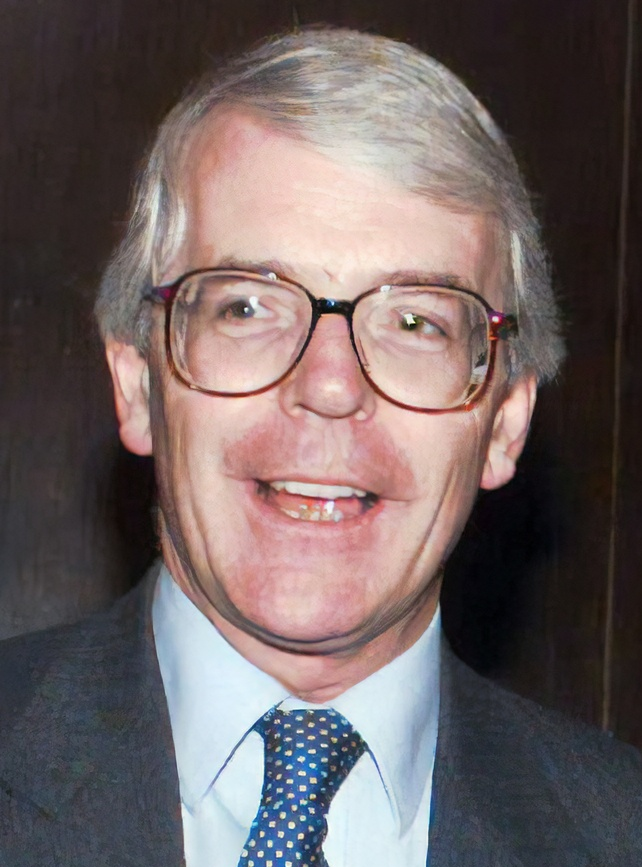
John Major in 1996

The 1997 Prime Minister's Resignation Honours were officially announced in two supplements to The London Gazette of 1 August 1997 (published 2 August 1997) and marked the May 1997 resignation of the Prime Minister, John Major.

A notable omission from the list was Norman Lamont, who was overlooked for a life peerage in what was seen as a snub for the former Chancellor of the Exchequer who had become one of Major's most prominent critics. Despite this, Major’s successor as leader William Hague appointed Lamont to the Lords the following year.

Included in the announced list were new "working peers": 31 new Labour life peers recommended by Tony Blair to reduce the Tory majority; Paddy Ashdown, the Liberal Democrat leader, recommended 11 new Liberal Democrat life peers; five were recommended by William Hague, the new Conservative Leader.

The recipients of the major classes of honours are displayed below, as they were styled before their new honour, and arranged by honour.

== Life peerages ==
- Norman Roy Blackwell, lately Head of the Policy Unit, Prime Minister's Office, 10 Downing Street. (created Baron Blackwell, of Woodcote in the County of Surrey)
- Janet Fookes, DBE, lately Member of Parliament for Plymouth, Drake. Deputy Speaker and Second Deputy Chairman of Ways and Means, House of Commons, 1992–97. (created Baroness Fookes, of Plymouth in the County of Devon)
- The Right Honourable Roger Norman Freeman, lately Member of Parliament for Kettering. Chancellor of the Duchy of Lancaster, 1995–97. (created Baron Freeman, of Dingley in the County of Northamptonshire)
- The Right Honourable Lord James Alexander Douglas-Hamilton, Q.C., lately Member of Parliament for Edinburgh West. Minister, Scottish Office, 1987–97; Minister of State for Home Affairs and Health, Scottish Office, (created Baron Selkirk of Douglas, of Cramond in the City of Edinburgh).
- The Right Honourable Sir Terence Langley Higgins, K.B.E., D.L., lately Member of Parliament for Worthing. Minister of State, Treasury, 1970–72; Financial Secretary, Treasury, 1972–74; Chairman, House of Commons Liaison Select Committee, 1984–97; Chairman, Treasury and Civil Service Select Committee, 1984–92. (created Baron Higgins, of Worthing in the County of West Sussex)
- The Right Honourable David James Fletcher Hunt, M.B.E., lately Member of Parliament for Wirral West. Secretary of State for Wales, 1990–93; for Employment, 1993–94; Chancellor of the Duchy of Lancaster and Minister for Public Service and Science, 1994–95. Senior Partner, Beachcroft Stanleys. (created Baron Hunt of Wirral, of Wirral in the County of Merseyside)
- Dame Joan Christabel Jill Knight, D.B.E., lately Member of Parliament for Birmingham, Edgbaston. Vice Chairman, 1922 Committee, 1987–97. (created Baroness Knight of Collingtree, of Collingtree in the County of Northamptonshire)
- The Right Honourable Ian Bruce Lang, lately Member of Parliament for Galloway and Upper Nithsdale. Secretary of State for Scotland, 1990–95; President of the Board of Trade, 1995–97. (created Baron Lang of Monkton, of Merrick and the Rhinns in the County of Dumfries & Galloway)
- The Right Honourable Antony Harold Newton, O.B.E., lately Member of Parliament for Braintree. Secretary of State for Social Security, 1989–92; Lord President of the Council and Leader of the House of Commons, 1992–97. (created Baron Newton of Braintree, of Coggeshall in the County of Essex)
- The Right Honourable Sir Cranley Gordon Douglas Onslow, K.C.M.G., lately Member of Parliament for Woking. Chairman, 1922 Committee, 1984–92. (created Baron Onslow of Woking, of Woking in the County of Surrey)

=== Conservative "working peers" ===
- The Right Honourable Sir John Ambrose Cope, lately Member of Parliament for Northavon; Deputy Chairman, Conservative Party, 1990–92; Paymaster General, 1992–94. (created Baron Cope of Berkeley, of Berkeley in the County of Gloucestershire)
- The Right Honourable William Armand Thomas Tristan Garel-Jones, lately Member of Parliament for Watford; Deputy Chief Whip, 1989–90; Minister of State, Foreign and Commonwealth Office, 1990–93. (created Baron Garel-Jones, of Watford in the County of Hertfordshire)
- The Right Honourable Sir Hector Seymour Peter Monro, A.E., D.L., lately Member of Parliament for Dumfries; Parliamentary Under-Secretary of State, Scottish Office, 1971–74; Department of the Environment, 1979–81; Scottish Office, 1992–95. (created Baron Monro of Langholm, of Westerkirk in the County of Dumfries & Galloway)
- The Right Honourable Michael Wolfgang Laurence Morris, lately Member of Parliament for Northampton South; Chairman of Ways and Means and Deputy Speaker, House of Commons, 1992–97. (created Baron Naseby, of Sandy in the County of Bedfordshire)
- The Right Honourable Sir leuan Wyn Pritchard Roberts, lately Member of Parliament for Conwy; Parliamentary Under-Secretary of State, 1979–87; Minister of State, 1987–94, Welsh Office. (created Baron Roberts of Conwy, of Talyfan in the County of Gwynedd)

=== Labour "working peers" ===
- Miss Valerie Amos, Director, Amos Fraser Bernard (created Baroness Amos, of Brondesbury in the London Borough of Brent)
- Steven Bassam, Leader, Brighton and Hove Council, Head of Environmental Health and Consumer Issues, Local Government Association; lately Assistant Secretary, AMA. (created Baron Bassam of Brighton, of Brighton in the County of East Sussex)
- Clive Brooke, Joint General Secretary, Public Services, Tax and Commerce Union (PTC). (created Baron Brooke of Alverthorpe, of Alverthorpe in the County of West Yorkshire)
- Tom Burlison, Deputy General Secretary, GMB and Treasurer, Labour Party. (created Baron Burlison, of Rowlands Gill in the County of Tyne and Wear)
- Bryan Davies, lately Member of Parliament for Oldham Central and Royton; Secretary, Parliamentary Labour Party 1979–92. (created Baron Davies of Oldham, of Broxbourne in the County of Hertfordshire)
- David Garfield Davies, C.B.E., General Secretary, Union of Shop, Distributive and Allied Workers. (created Baron Davies of Coity, of Penybont in the County of Mid Glamorgan)
- James Stuart Gordon, C.B.E., Chairman, Scottish Radio Holdings. (created Baron Gordon of Strathblane, of Deil's Craig in the City of Stirling)
- Peter Hardy, lately Member of Parliament for Wentworth; Leader, Labour Delegation to the Council of Europe and WEU 1983–95 and of Labour Delegation to OSCE, 1990–97. (created Baron Hardy of Wath, of Wath upon Dearne in the County of South Yorkshire)
- Norman Hogg, lately Member of Parliament for Cumbernauld and Kilsyth; Deputy Chief Opposition Whip, 1983–87. (created Baron Hogg of Cumbernauld, of Cumbernauld in the County of North Lanarkshire)
- Robert Hughes, lately Member of Parliament for Aberdeen North; Opposition spokesperson, Agriculture, 1983–84; Transport, 1985–88; Shadow Cabinet, 1985–88. (created Baron Hughes of Woodside, of Woodside in the City of Aberdeen)
- Royston John Hughes, D.L., lately Member of Parliament for Newport East; Opposition spokesperson of Welsh Affairs, 1984–88; Member of the Council of Europe, 1990–97. (created Baron Islwyn, of Casnewydd in the County of Gwent)
- Philip Alexander Hunt, O.B.E., Chief Executive, National Health Service Confederation. (created Baron Hunt of Kings Heath, of Birmingham in the County of the West Midlands)
- The Honourable Greville Ewan Janner, Q.C ., lately Member of Parliament for Leicester West; Honorary Vice President, World Jewish Congress. (created Baron Janner of Braunstone, of Leicester in the County of Leicestershire)
- Helena Ann, Mrs. Kennedy, Q.C., Queen's Counsel. (created Baroness Kennedy of The Shaws, of Cathcart in the City of Glasgow)
- Michael Abraham Levy, Director, M and G Records; President, Jewish Care (created Baron Levy, of Mill Hill in the London Borough of Barnet)
- Michael Jacob Montague, C.B.E., Chairman, Superframe plc; Chairman Montague Multinational Ltd; formerly Chairman, English Tourist Board, created Baron Montague of Oxford, of Oxford in the County of Oxfordshire)
- The Right Honourable Alfred Morris, A.O., Q.S.O., lately Member of Parliament for Manchester (Wythenshawe); Opposition spokesman on Social Services, 1970–74 and 1979–92; Minister for the Disabled, 1974–79. (created Baron Morris of Manchester, of Manchester in the County of Greater Manchester)
- The Right Honourable Stanley Orme, lately Member of Parliament for Salford East; Minister of State for Social Security and Member of the Cabinet, 1977–79; Opposition spokesman, Health and Social Services, 1979–80, on Industry, 1980–83, on Energy, 1983–87; Chairman, Parliamentary Labour Party, 1987–92. (created Baron Orme, of Salford in the County of Greater Manchester)
- Jill Elizabeth, Mrs. Pitkeathley, O.B.E., Chief Executive, Carers National Association; Member, Health Advisory Service. (created Baroness Pitkeathley, of Caversham in the Royal County of Berkshire)
- Sir David Terence Puttnam, C.B.E., Film Producer; Chairman Enigma Productions Ltd. (created Baron Puttnam, of Queensgate in the Royal Borough of Kensington and Chelsea)
- Stuart Randall, lately Member of Parliament for Kingston upon Hull West; Opposition spokesman on Agriculture, Food and Fisheries Affairs, 1985–87; on Home Affairs, 1987–92. (created Baron Randall of St Budeaux, of St Budeaux in the County of Devon)
- Ruth Barbara, Mrs. Rendell, C.B.E., Author. (created Baroness Rendell of Babergh, of Aldeburgh in the County of Suffolk)
- Sir Robin William Renwick, K.C.M.G., Director Robert Fleming Holdings Ltd; Chairman, Save & Prosper Group; H.M. Ambassador, South Africa, 1987–91, United States of America, 1991–95. (created Baron Renwick of Clifton, of Chelsea in the Royal Borough of Kensington and Chelsea)
- David John Sainsbury, Chairman and Chief Executive, Sainsbury's. (created Baron Sainsbury of Turville, of Turville in the County of Buckinghamshire)
- Miss Patricia Janet Scotland, Q.C., Queen's Counsel. (created Baroness Scotland of Asthal, of Asthal in the County of Oxfordshire)
- George Simpson, Managing Director, General Electric Company (created Baron Simpson of Dunkeld, of Dunkeld in the County of Perth and Kinross)
- Andrew Zelig Stone, Joint Managing Director, Marks & Spencer (created Baron Stone of Blackheath, of Blackheath in the London Borough of Greenwich)
- Terence James Thomas, C.B.E., Managing Director, The Co-operative Bank (created Baron Thomas of Macclesfield, of Prestbury in the County of Cheshire)
- The Right Honourable Sir Harold Walker, lately Member of Parliament for Doncaster Central; Chairman of Ways and Means and Deputy Speaker, House of Commons, 1983–92 (created Baron Walker of Doncaster, of Audenshaw in the County of Greater Manchester)
- Michael Goodall Watson, lately Member of Parliament for Glasgow Central; Chairman, Parliamentary Labour Party Overseas Development Aid Committee, 1991–97 (created Baron Watson of Invergowrie, of Invergowrie in the County of Perth and Kinross)
- Miss Barbara Scott Young, Chief Executive, Royal Society for the Preservation of Birds (created Baroness Young of Old Scone, of Old Scone in the County of Perth and Kinross)

=== Liberal Democrat "working peers" ===
- Navnit Dholakia, O.B.E., Member, Liberal Democrat Federal Executive and Federal Policy Committee; Member, Police Complaints Authority. (created Baron Dholakia, of Waltham Brooks in the County of West Sussex)
- Sir William Howard Goodhart, Q.C., Queen's Counsel. (created Baron Goodhart, of Youlbury in the County of Oxfordshire)
- Sir David Anthony Jacobs, Vice President, Social and Liberal Democrats, 1988; Chairman, Federal Executive, Social and Liberal Democrats, 1988. (created Baron Jacobs, of Belgravia in the City of Westminster)
- Veronica, Mrs. Linklater, Chairman, The New School Butterstone; Trustee, Esmee Fairbairn Charitable Trust; Trustee, Cancer Care, Western General Hospital. (created Baroness Linklater of Butterstone, of Riemore in the County of Perth and Kinross)
- Sarah Ann, Mrs. Ludford, Barrister; Councillor, Islington Local Borough Council; European Affairs Consultant. (created Baroness Ludford, of Clerkenwell in the London Borough of Islington)
- Diana Margaret, Mrs. Maddock, lately Member of Parliament for Christchurch. Liberal Democrat spokeswoman on Housing, Women's Issues and Family Policy, 1994–97. (created Baroness Maddock, of Christchurch in the County of Dorset)
- Richard Mark Newby, O.B.E., Director, Matrix Communications Consultancy Ltd; Chairman, Reform Publications Ltd; lately Director of External Communication, Liberal Democrat General Election Team, 1996–97. (created Baron Newby, of Rothwell in the County of West Yorkshire)
- Emma Harriet, Mrs. Nicholson, lately Member of Parliament for Devon West and Torridge; Liberal Democrat spokeswoman on International Development, 1995–97. (created Baroness Nicholson of Winterbourne, of Winterbourne in the Royal County of Berkshire)
- Edward Timothy Razzall, C.B.E., Liberal Democrat Councillor, Richmond Borough Council; Treasurer, Liberal Democrats. (created Baron Razzall, of Mortlake in the London Borough of Richmond)
- Sir Michael Graham Ruddock Sandberg, C.B.E., Chairman, The Hong Kong and Shanghai Banking Corporation, 1977–86; The British Bank of the Middle East, 1980–86. (created Baron Sandberg, of Passfield in the County of Hampshire)
- Sir Trevor Arthur Smith, Vice Chancellor and Honorary Professor, University of Ulster. (created Baron Smith of Clifton, of Mount Sandel in the County of Londonderry)

== Knights Bachelor ==
- The Right Honourable Robert James Atkins, lately Member of Parliament for South Ribble. Minister of State, Northern Ireland Office, 1992-94, at the Department of the Environment, 1994-95.
- Peter Randolph Brown, Agent to the Right Honourable John Major, M.P.
- The Right Honourable Michael Bruce Forsyth, lately Member of Parliament for Stirling. Minister of State, Scottish Office, 1990-92, at the Department of Employment, 1992-94, at the Home Office, 1995-95; Secretary of State for Scotland, 1995-97.
- Anthony Peter Garrett, C.B.E., Director, Campaigning Department, Conservative Central Office.
- The Right Honourable Brian Stanley Mahwhinney, M.P., Member of Parliament for Cambridgeshire North West. Secretary of State for Transport 1994-95; Chairman of the Conservative Party and Minister without Portfolio, 1995-97.
- The Right Honourable Richard Francis Needham, lately Member of Parliament for Wiltshire North. Minister of State, Department of Trade and Industry, 1992-95.
- Neville Guthrie Trotter, D.L., lately Member of Parliament for Tynemouth.
- John Devereux Ward, C.B.E., lately Member of Parliament for Poole. Parliamentary Private Secretary to the Prime Minister, 1994-97.

== Order of the Companions of Honour ==
=== Member of the Order of the Companions of Honour (CH) ===
- Michael Heseltine, Former Deputy Prime Minister and Member of Parliament for Henley (later Lord Heseltine)

== Order of St Michael and St George ==
=== Knight Commander of the Order of St Michael and St George (KCMG) ===
- Alastair Goodlad, Former Conservative Chief Whip and Parliamentary Secretary to the Treasury
- Jeremy Hanley, Former Chairman of the Conservative Party and Defence and Foreign Office Minister
- Malcolm Rifkind, Former Secretary of State for Foreign and Commonwealth Affairs, Scotland, Transport and Defence. (Later Conservative MP for the constituency of Kensington and Chelsea)

=== Companion of the Order of St Michael and St George (CMG) ===
- John Holmes, Private Secretary, Prime Minister's Office (Overseas Affairs)

== Order of the British Empire ==
=== Commander of the Order of the British Empire (CBE) ===
- Jonathan Haslam, Former Chief Press Secretary, Number 10
- Howell James, Former Political Secretary, Number 10
- Professor Lord McColl of Dulwich, Former Parliamentary Private Secretary to the Prime Minister 1995–97
- Michael Trend, Deputy Chairman of the Conservative Party 1995–2000.

=== Officer of the Order of the British Empire (OBE) ===
- Mark Adams, Private Secretary, Prime Minister's Office (Parliamentary Affairs)
- John Bridge, Constituency chairman to John Major
- Trevor Butler, Detective Superintendent, Metropolitan Police Service
- Daniel Finkelstein, Director of Research, Conservative Central Office
- Gina Hearn, Constituency Secretary to John Major
- Charles Lewington, Former Director of Communications, Conservative Central Office
- Eileen, Lady Strathnaver, Former Special Adviser to the Deputy Prime Minister, Michael Heseltine
- William Geoffrey Thompson, Managing Director of Blackpool Pleasure Beach
- Andrew Woods, Former agent to John Major
- Moira Wallace, Private Secretary, Number 10 (Economic Affairs)

=== Member of the Order of the British Empire (MBE) ===
- Deborah Ailes, Senior Personal Secretary, Prime Minister's Office
- Noelle Berney, Co-ordinator of Kurdish Life Aid (for humanitarian services)
- Maureen Bick, Cleaner, Prime Minister's Office
- James Bridge, Former Assistant Political Secretary, Prime Minister's Office
- Penelope Brook, Head of Speakers' Department, Conservative Central Office
- Christine Ferns, Switchboard Supervisor, Prime Minister's Office
- Vanessa Ford, Head of Chairman's Office, Conservative Central Office
- Sheila Gunn, Press Officer, Conservative Central Office
- Leading Wren Linda Lalley, Stewardess at Chequers (Royal Navy)
- Judy Moorhouse, Former Secretary to the Political Secretary, Prime Minister's Office
- Lorne Roper-Caldbeck, Secretary to Prime Minister's wife, Norma Major
- Robert Rumble, Driver to Prime Minister John Major
- Arabella Warburton, Former Personal Assistant in the Prime Minister's Office
- Michael York, Messenger, Prime Minister's Office

== Sources ==
- The Independent, 2 August 1997
