= Gisela Stuart =

British-German politician and life peer (born 1955)

The Right Honourable The Baroness Stuart of Edgbaston PC
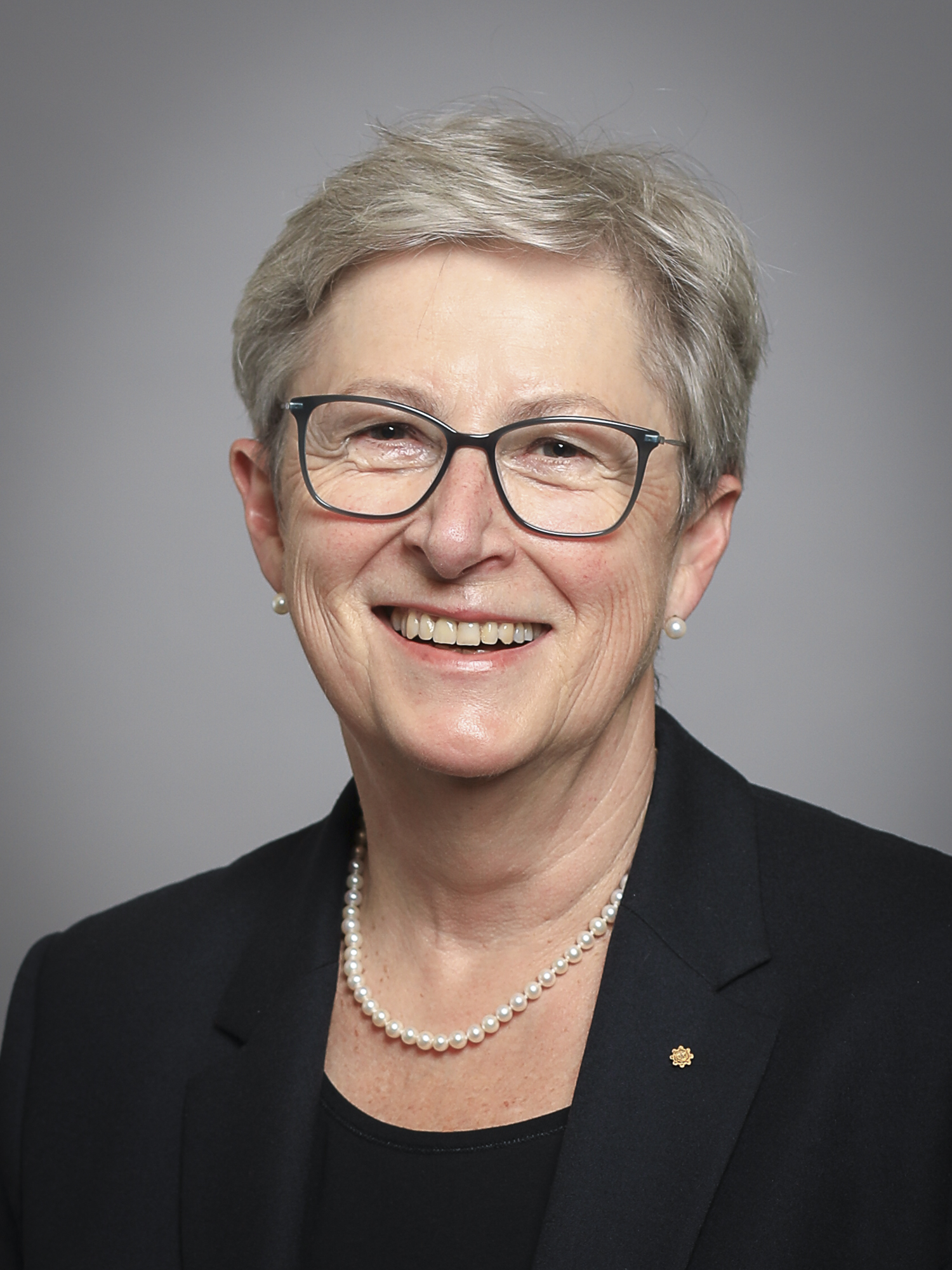
- Official portrait, 2020

First Civil Service Commissioner
- Incumbent
- Assumed office 3 March 2022
- Prime Minister: Boris Johnson; Liz Truss; Rishi Sunak; Keir Starmer; Andy Burnham
- Preceded by: Ian Watmore

Member of the House of Lords
- Lord Temporal
- Life peerage 7 September 2020

Member of Parliament for Birmingham Edgbaston
- In office 1 May 1997 – 3 May 2017
- Preceded by: Jill Knight
- Succeeded by: Preet Gill

Parliamentary Under-Secretary of State for Health
- In office 29 July 1999 – 8 June 2001
- Prime Minister: Tony Blair
- Preceded by: The Baroness Hayman
- Succeeded by: Hazel Blears

Chair of Change Britain
- In office 10 September 2016 – 31 January 2020
- Preceded by: Position established
- Succeeded by: Position dissolved

Personal details
- Born: Gisela Gschaider; 26 November 1955 (age 70) Velden, Bavaria, West Germany
- Citizenship: British
- Party: Independent (2020–present); Labour (1994–2019)
- Spouses: Robert Stuart (m. 1980; div. 2000); Derek Scott (m. 2010; died 2012)
- Children: 2
- Education: University of London; University of Birmingham (did not graduate)
- Occupation: First Civil Service Commissioner
- Website: Commission Website

Gisela Stuart, Baroness Stuart of Edgbaston (née Gschaider; born 26 November 1955) is a British-German politician and life peer who served as Member of Parliament (MP) for Birmingham Edgbaston from 1997 to 2017. A former member of the Labour Party, she now sits as a crossbencher in the House of Lords.

A prominent Brexiteer, she promoted the passing of Article 50 of the TEU, thereby establishing a mechanism for the UK's exit from the EU.

Born and raised in West Germany, Stuart moved to the United Kingdom in 1974. Elected for Birmingham Edgbaston at the 1997 general election, she was chair of the Vote Leave Campaign Committee and was one of its most high-profile figures, along with the Conservative MPs Boris Johnson and Michael Gove. The Vote Leave campaign was successful in achieving its goal at the 2016 United Kingdom European Union membership referendum of winning a majority of votes for Leave. From 2016 to 2020, she served as chair of Vote Leave's successor organisation, Change Britain.

After she had left Parliament, Stuart was appointed by the Conservative government as chair of Wilton Park, an executive agency of the UK Foreign Office dedicated to conflict resolution in international relations, in October 2018. She is a member of the Steering Committee of the Constitution Reform Group (CRG), a cross-party organisation chaired by Robert Gascoyne-Cecil, 7th Marquess of Salisbury, which seeks a new constitutional settlement in the UK by way of a new Act of Union. The Constitution Reform Group's new Act of Union Bill was introduced as a Private Member's Bill on 9 October 2018.

Baroness Stuart was appointed as the First Civil Service Commissioner in March 2022.

== Early life ==
Gisela Gschaider was born in Velden, Bavaria, West Germany on 26 November 1955 to Martin and Liane Gschaider. She attended the Staatliche Realschule (Note: In the selective German education system, a "realschule" is a school for adolescents with average academic abilities.) in Vilsbiburg. After doing an apprenticeship in bookselling, she moved to the UK in 1974 in order to improve her English and to do a Business Studies course at Manchester Polytechnic. She was deputy director of the 1983 London Book Fair. Stuart subsequently relocated to the Midlands.

She graduated from the University of London with an LLB in 1993, having studied through the University of London External System at Worcestershire College of Technology. She began researching for a PhD in trust law (ownership of pension funds) at the University of Birmingham while she also lectured Law to AAT and law students at Worcestershire College, where she had studied, but did not complete her PhD and instead went into politics full-time.

In 1994, as Gisela Gschaider, Stuart contested the Worcester and South Warwickshire seat at the European elections for Labour. She lost by 1,000 votes.

== Parliamentary career ==
In 1995, Stuart was selected as Labour's parliamentary candidate for the Birmingham Edgbaston constituency. The constituency, which had once been held by former Conservative Prime Minister Neville Chamberlain (1937–40), had returned only Conservative MPs for 99 years. The sitting Conservative MP at the time, Dame Jill Knight, was retiring after 31 years. On 1 May 1997, Stuart was elected as the first-ever Labour MP for the constituency, making it one of a succession of traditional Conservative seats to fall to Labour control in a landslide victory for the party. Stuart's victory was the first televised Labour gain of the evening.

During the First Blair ministry, Stuart served on the Social Security Select Committee and in 1998 as PPS to Home Office Minister of State Paul Boateng, before joining the government in 1999 as Parliamentary Under-Secretary of State for Health. Stuart left this post in the reshuffle that followed after the 2001 election. Her election agent in that election was John Clancy, who became Leader of Birmingham City Council in 2015.

In Blair's second ministry, Stuart was appointed as one of the UK Parliamentary Representatives to the European Convention, which was tasked with drawing up a new constitution for the European Union. In this capacity, Stuart also served as one of the thirteen members of the Convention's Presidium – the steering group responsible for managing the business of the Convention and which drafted the text of the constitution then approved by the full Convention.

After the draft Constitution emerged, Stuart became one of the most trenchant critics of the proposal, stating that it had been drawn up by a "self-selected group of the European political elite" determined to deepen European integration. She subsequently expounded these views in a 2004 Fabian Society pamphlet, The Making of Europe's Constitution. Consequently, she argued in favour of British withdrawal from the European Union, becoming one of the leading Eurosceptic figures in the Labour Party. These views were countered in a rebuttal by the European Parliamentary Labour Party spokesman on EU constitutional affairs published on-line by the Fabians and in a pamphlet published by the Labour Movement for Europe.

In October 2004, she became the only Labour MP who openly supported the re-election of George W. Bush at that year's U.S. presidential election, arguing "you know where you stand with George and, in today's world, that's much better than rudderless leaders who drift with the prevailing wind". She wrote that a victory for Democratic Party challenger, John Kerry, would prompt "victory celebrations among those who want to destroy liberal democracies. More terrorists and suicide bombers would step forward to become martyrs in their quest to destroy the West".

Between 2001 and 2010, Stuart also served as a member of the House of Commons Select Committee on Foreign Affairs.

She retained her seat at the 2005 election but her majority was halved in both percentage and numerical terms. Despite the predictions of the pundits, Stuart went on to retain the seat at the 2010 general election, against a national tide of Labour defeat. The election resulted in the first hung parliament in 36 years, with the Conservatives having the most seats. It earned her the title of Survivor of the Year at The Spectator magazine's 2010 Parliamentarian of the Year awards, which was presented to her by the new Conservative Prime Minister, David Cameron. She retained her seat at the 2015 election with a majority of 2,706 votes, more than double her majority from 2010. She joined the Commons Select Committee on Defence.

Stuart is a signatory of the Henry Jackson Society principles, which promote the spread of liberal democracy across the world and the maintenance of a strong military with global expeditionary reach.

She was sworn in as a member of the Privy Council of the United Kingdom in 2015, giving her the honorific title "The Right Honourable" for life.

Since 2015, Stuart has been a Steering Committee member of the Constitution Reform Group (CRG), a cross-party pressure group of current and former politicians, academics, constitutional law experts, former officials in Parliament and government and ordinary citizens. The CRG seeks a new constitutional settlement in the UK by way of a new Act of Union. The Constitution Reform Group's new Act of Union Bill was introduced as a Private Member's Bill by Lord Lisvane in the House of Lords on 9 October 2018, when it received a formal first reading. The BBC described the Bill as "one to watch" in that Parliament.

She announced on 19 April 2017 that she would not seek re-election at the 2017 snap general election. She was succeeded by Preet Gill, a Labour and Co-operative politician, and the first female British Sikh MP.

In 2019, Stuart announced she would vote for the Conservative Party in the 2019 general election. She remained a member of the Labour Party after the election.

In the 2019 Dissolution Honours, Stuart was given a life peerage; she initially sat as a non-affiliated peer before becoming a crossbencher.

== Vote Leave ==
Stuart served as Chair of Vote Leave, the body which was designated by the Electoral Commission as the official campaign in favour of leaving the European Union in the 2016 referendum on European Union membership. Other spokespersons for Vote Leave included Conservative MPs Boris Johnson and Michael Gove. There were various other groups advocating for Leave, officially working independently of Vote Leave, including UKIP and the Labour Leave.

In the BBC's two-hour televised debate on the EU referendum, Stuart appeared on the "Leave" panel, along with the Conservative MPs Andrea Leadsom and Boris Johnson.

Stuart's own constituency of Birmingham Edgbaston voted to Remain in the EU.

After stepping down at the 2017 general election, Stuart revealed that she had pushed for an exit clause in the European Constitution, which later became Article 50 of the Treaty on European Union. Article 50 allows for withdrawal from the European Union by any member state and was invoked for the first and only time by Prime Minister Theresa May on 29 March 2017.

== Outside of politics ==
In 2016, Stuart became the sixth President of the Birmingham Bach Choir.

Stuart became the chair of Wilton Park, an executive agency of the UK Foreign Office dedicated to conflict resolution in international relations, on 1 October 2018. From 2020-2022 Stuart was the lead non-executive board member of the Cabinet Office. She was appointed as First Civil Service Commissioner in March 2022.

Stuart was appointed an Honorary Captain in the Royal Naval Reserve in July 2021.

In 2021, Stuart was appointed chair of the Royal Mint Advisory Committee for a term of five years from 1 March 2021 to 28 February 2026.

== Personal life ==
She is a Catholic. She has two sons. She married Robert Stuart in 1980, and they divorced in 2000. She then married the former Labour adviser Derek Scott in 2010. Scott died in 2012.

== Notes ==
Parliament of the United Kingdom
Preceded by Jill Knight	Member of Parliament for Birmingham Edgbaston; 1997–2017	Succeeded by Preet Kaur Gill
