= Edith Pitt =

British Conservative politician (1906–66)

Dame Edith Pitt DBE
- Pitt in 1954

Member of Parliament for Birmingham Edgbaston
- In office 2 July 1953 – 27 January 1966 (died in office)
- Preceded by: Peter Bennett
- Succeeded by: Jill Knight

Personal details
- Born: Edith Maud Pitt; 14 October 1906 Birmingham, England, UK
- Died: 27 January 1966 (aged 59) Queen Elizabeth Hospital Birmingham
- Party: Conservative

Dame Edith Maud Pitt, DBE (14 October 1906 – 27 January 1966) was a British Conservative Party MP for the Birmingham Edgbaston seat. She had also sat on Birmingham City Council, and sought several Parliamentary seats before being placed in the Conservative safe seat of Edgbaston. When she died, she was succeeded by Jill Knight.

== Early life ==
Edith Maud Pitt was born in Birmingham on 14 October 1906. She was the oldest of six children, and her father was a die-stamper. She attended a Birmingham council school, as well as night school before becoming a junior clerk.

== Political career ==
Pitt joined the Conservative Party in 1929, and gained a seat on Birmingham City Council. While working for the Council she was a member of an interim committee, established in 1947, designed to ensure that the Council was ready to implement the reforms of the Children Act 1948.

She was selected as the Conservative candidate for Birmingham Stechford for the 1950 general election, but lost to the future Home Secretary, Roy Jenkins. She fought the seat again in 1951 unsuccessfully. The Liberal Party did not put forward a candidate, resulting in a straight fight between Pitt and Jenkins. She gained 23,384 votes to Jenkin's 34,355, a reduction on his majority.

Pitt failed to get elected for the safe Labour seat of Birmingham Small Heath in a 1952 by-election. Following her defeat in the by-election, it was suggested that she could again stand for the Birmingham Stechford constituency. She was instead chosen to represent the Conservatives for the Birmingham Edgbaston seat, one which was considered to be safe. The selection of a female candidate for a safe seat was considered by the press to be a change in policy for the Conservative party.

Her candidacy had been caused by the resignation in 1953 of Peter Bennett after he had been made 1st Baron Bennett of Edgbaston and took a seat in the House of Lords. The Labour Party candidate was F. B. Watson. Both Watson and Pitt had seats on Birmingham City Council.

In the resultant by-election, Pitt received 20,142 votes to Watson's 9,635 for a majority of 10,507. However this was a drop of 2,597 in majority from the previous election. She said after the votes were tallied, "This can be no satisfaction to the Tory party that, in their own traditional stronghold, they have polled so few votes." She was the first female MP to represent Edgbaston.

On the opening day of the Parliament in 1953, Pitt made her maiden speech. She spoke in support of John Morrison's opening address of thanks to Queen Elizabeth II on behalf of the new Parliament, and was cheered on by her fellow Members. Following this, former Prime Minister Clement Attlee said of Pitt, "I think the House was impressed by the sincerity and knowledge with which she spoke on subjects very dear to her heart."

By 1960, she was a Parliamentary Secretary in the Ministry of Health. One of the issues she spoke to the House of Commons about was the effect of poorly shaped shoes on children. She launched an independent report into the problem in February 1960. She was made Dame Commander of the Most Excellent Order of the British Empire in 1962. At the 1964 general election, Pitt retained her seat. She chaired the Air Corporations Act 1966 through the committee stage until Christmas Recess 1965. She died before Parliament returned and Robert Carr began the tributes to her on behalf of the bill team on 3 February 1966. Following her death, at the 1966 general election, Jill Knight was elected as her successor, who retained the seat for the following eight general elections. Knight and Pitt knew each other well.

== Death ==
After collapsing at her home in Yardley, Birmingham on 24 January 1966, she was moved to the Queen Elizabeth Hospital Birmingham and died of a brain haemorrhage on 27 January.

== Notes ==
Parliament of the United Kingdom
Preceded by Peter Bennett	Member of Parliament for Birmingham Edgbaston; 1953–1966	Succeeded by Jill Knight
