= Tim Loughton =

British Conservative politician (born 1962)

Tim Loughton FSA
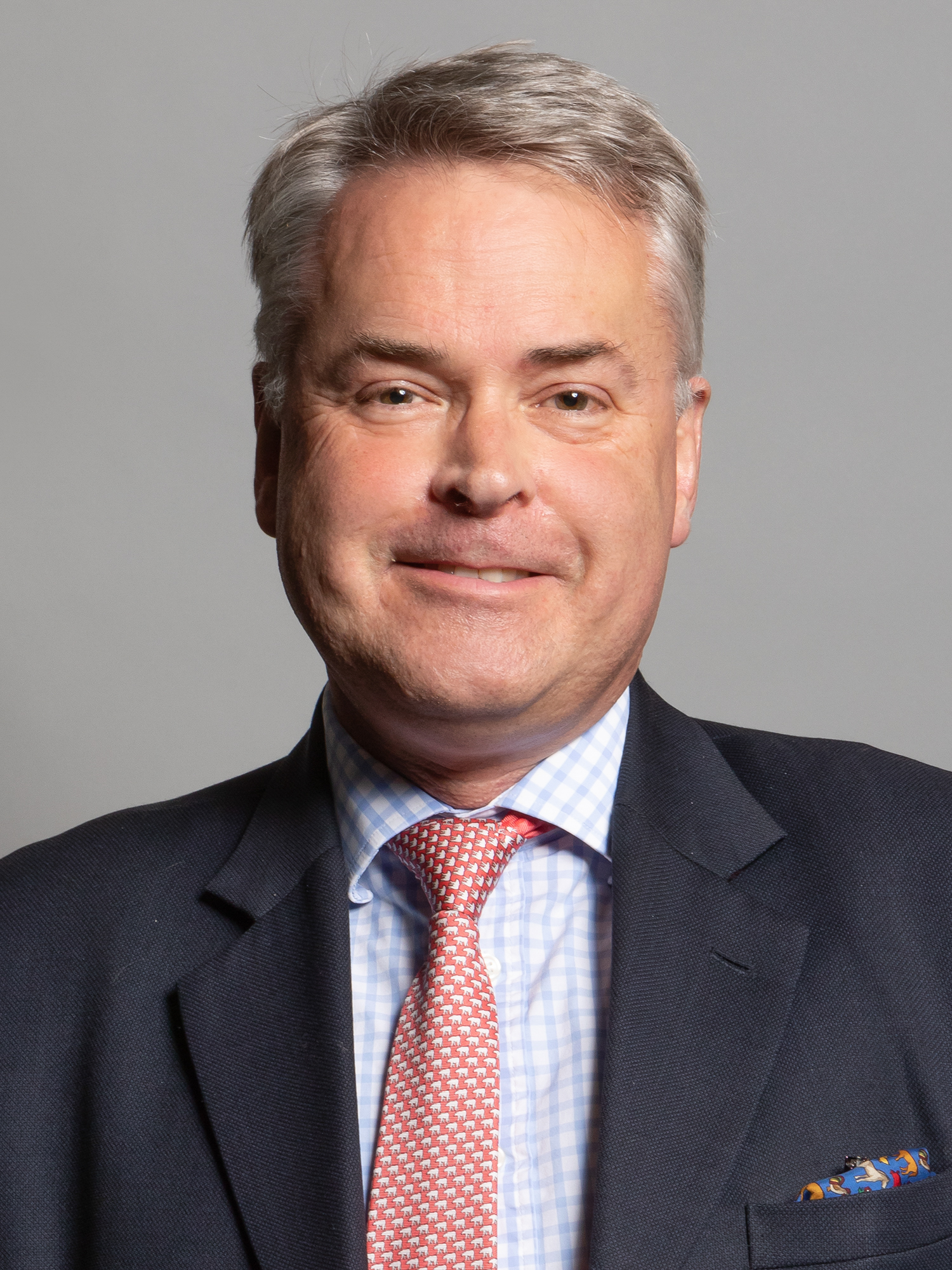
- Official portrait, 2020

Acting Chair of the Home Affairs Select Committee
- In office 1 December 2021 – 15 December 2021
- Preceded by: Yvette Cooper
- Succeeded by: Diana Johnson
- In office 6 September 2016 – 19 October 2016
- Preceded by: Keith Vaz
- Succeeded by: Yvette Cooper

Parliamentary Under-Secretary of State for Children and Families
- In office 13 May 2010 – 4 September 2012
- Prime Minister: David Cameron
- Preceded by: The Baroness Morgan of Drefelin
- Succeeded by: Edward Timpson

Member of Parliament for East Worthing and Shoreham
- In office 1 May 1997 – 30 May 2024
- Preceded by: Constituency created
- Succeeded by: Tom Rutland

Personal details
- Born: Timothy Paul Loughton; 30 May 1962 (age 64) Eastbourne, Sussex, England
- Party: Conservative
- Spouse: Elizabeth Juliet MacLauchlan
- Children: 3
- Education: University of Warwick; Clare College, Cambridge

Timothy Paul Loughton, FSA (/ˈlɔːtən/ LAW-tən; born 30 May 1962) is a British politician and former banker who served as Member of Parliament (MP) for East Worthing and Shoreham from 1997 to 2024. A member of the Conservative Party, he was Parliamentary Under-Secretary of State for Children and Families from 2010 to 2012 and has twice served as the Acting Chairman of the Home Affairs Select Committee in 2016 and 2021, following the respective resignations of Keith Vaz and Yvette Cooper.

In April 2024, Loughton announced that he would not seek re-election as an MP at the 2024 general election. In March 2025, he announced on his website that he is launching a campaign to seek the Conservative Party nomination for the newly created position of Sussex Mayor following the publication of the English Devolution White Paper, which set out the government's plans for local government reorganisation.

== Early life and career ==
Timothy Loughton was born on 30 May 1962 in Eastbourne, East Sussex. From 1973 to 1980, he was educated at Priory School, a state comprehensive school in Lewes, East Sussex. From 1980 to 1983, he studied classical civilisation at the University of Warwick. He was the secretary of the University of Warwick Conservative Association. He graduated with a first class honours Bachelor of Arts (BA Hons) degree in 1983. He then attended Clare College, Cambridge, where he studied Mesopotamian archaeology between 1983 and 1984.

Loughton subsequently had a career in the City of London as a fund manager from 1984 for Fleming Private Asset Management, becoming a director from 1992 to 2000.

== Parliamentary career ==
=== Early career ===
Loughton unsuccessfully contested Sheffield Brightside for the Conservative Party at the 1992 general election, finishing in second with 16.8% behind the incumbent Labour MP David Blunkett.

Loughton was elected as MP for East Worthing and Shoreham at the 1997 general election, winning with 40.5% of the vote and a majority of 5,098.

From 2000 to 2001, Loughton was Shadow Minister for Environment and from 2003 to 2010 he was Shadow Minister of Health and Children, during the Conservative Party's time as the shadow cabinet in opposition to the Labour Party.

At the 2001 general election, Loughton was re-elected as MP for East Worthing and Shoreham with an increased vote share of 43.2% and an increased majority of 6,139. He was again re-elected at the 2005 general election with an increased vote share of 43.9% and an increased majority of 8,183.

In 2010, Loughton appeared in the Channel 4 documentary series, Tower Block of Commons.

=== Ministerial career ===
Loughton was again re-elected at the 2010 general election with an increased vote share of 48.5% and an increased majority of 11,105. After the election, Loughton was appointed Parliamentary Under Secretary of State for Children and Families, a position commonly known as 'children's minister'.

In February 2012, Loughton was part of a ministerial working group on how the law should be changed regarding how to amend the Children Act 1989. According to The Guardian on 3 February 2012, the working group aimed to include in the new Children's Act one "presumption of shared parenting" for children's fathers and mothers after cases of divorce or spousal break up.

In May 2012, he said marriage was a religious institution that should remain between one man and one woman. Loughton voted against the Marriage (Same Sex Couples) Bill.

Loughton was dismissed as Parliamentary Under Secretary of State for Children and Families in the government reshuffle of September 2012.

=== Backbench career ===
In January 2013, Loughton was involved in a political dispute involving his earlier work as a minister in the Department for Education (DofE) when he compared the role of Education Secretary Michael Gove to "Young Mr Grace" from the British sitcom Are You Being Served?, suggesting there was little interaction between ministers and staff in the department. The next day Loughton was described in an anonymous briefing from the DofE to The Spectator as a "lazy, incompetent narcissist obsessed only with self-promotion". The following month Loughton tabled "hostile" parliamentary questions to the Department of Education on the subject of complaints by staff, which The Independent described as "a significant escalation of hostilities" between Loughton and some of his old colleagues.

In March 2013, it was reported that Loughton had been investigated by Sussex Police under the Malicious Communications Act following a complaint lodged by a constituent over Loughton's reply to their email. After several months, Loughton was advised by the Sussex Police that they would not be filing any charges. Loughton subsequently gave his account of the affair in a parliamentary privilege protected House of Commons speech and criticised the police response. Loughton then mailed a Hansard copy of the speech to the constituent, an action he believed was covered by parliamentary privilege.

The constituent lodged another complaint about being sent the parliamentary papers, and Loughton was issued with a Police Information Notice (PIN) by Sussex Police. Loughton then arranged an emergency parliamentary debate, during which he accused the police of violating parliamentary privilege by issuing the PIN. A motion for the Standards and Privileges Committee to investigate his claims was granted. At a hearing of the Standards and Privileges committee in January 2014, Loughton said that by issuing the PIN the police had "exacerbated the situation out of all control". Sussex Chief Constable Martin Richards apologised to the committee, claiming he was unaware the Parliamentary Papers Act 1840 gave full legal protection to all parliamentary papers and blamed conflicting legal advice. Former deputy Chief Constable of Sussex Police Robin Merrett claimed he "could understand" the constituent being "alarmed" at receiving the copy of Hansard and "fully supported" the police actions. In March 2014, the Standards and Privileges Committee found Sussex Police in contempt of Parliament, forcing Sussex Police to issue an apology.

In September 2013, Loughton apologised to former children's minister Sarah Teather after he was recorded at an event saying the Department of Education as a result of Teather was a "family free zone" and that Teather "did not believe in family" as "she certainly didn't produce one of her own". The comments made by Loughton were described as "disgusting" by Jo Swinson, the Liberal Democrat minister for Women and Equalities.

At the 2015 general election, Loughton was again re-elected with an increased vote share of 49.5% and an increased majority of 14,949.

In August 2015, it was reported that Loughton was amongst a number of supporters of other political parties who had paid £3 to register to join the Labour Party in an attempt to participate in its leadership election. He subsequently said he had registered using his parliamentary email account to reveal "what a complete farce the whole thing is." He said that he was open in his intent and would not have actually voted. He was subsequently removed from Labour's registered supporters list and not granted a vote in the Labour Leadership election. The fee paid by Loughton to register to a supporter of the Labour Party was retained as a donation.

In September 2015, it was reported that Loughton had claimed the fourth highest expenses claim in the country.

Loughton supported Brexit in the 2016 European Union membership referendum. He campaigned for it through the Vote Leave organisation.

Loughton was Campaign Manager for Andrea Leadsom's unsuccessful bid to become leader of the Conservative Party.

From 6 September 2016 – 19 October 2016, Loughton acted as Chairman of the Home Affairs Select Committee following the resignation of the Labour MP Keith Vaz over alleged inappropriate behaviour.

Loughton was again re-elected at the snap 2017 general election, with a decreased vote share of 48.9% and a decreased majority of 5,106.

On 29 June 2017, Loughton came fifth in the ballot of private members' bills. He subsequently introduced the Civil Partnerships, Marriages and Deaths (Registration Etc.) Bill.

After Loughton announced in October 2017 that he meditates in the bath for an hour every morning, it was reported that he had built up water bills over the previous two years of £662, which he had put on his expenses. After his initial comments on the length of time he spent in baths led to negative commentary in sections of the press, Loughton responded: "MP takes bath is apparently hot news in Westminster at the moment. However, the real story was a conference I co-hosted at Westminster yesterday, which brought together 20 MPs from over 15 countries to promote mindfulness as one of the ways we can help tackle the epidemic of mental illness."

In July 2018, he participated in the first Worthing Pride parade. A year later in July 2019, Loughton voted to extend same-sex marriage and abortion to Northern Ireland.

In the House of Commons, Loughton sits on the Home Affairs Select Committee. He has previously sat on the Draft Mental Health Bill (Joint Committee) and Environmental Audit Committee.

Loughton employs his wife as a part-time office manager on a salary up to £25,000. The practice of MPs employing family members has been criticised by some sections of the media on the lines that it promotes nepotism. Although MPs who were first elected in 2017 have been banned from employing family members, the restriction is not retrospective – meaning that Loughton's employment of his wife is lawful.

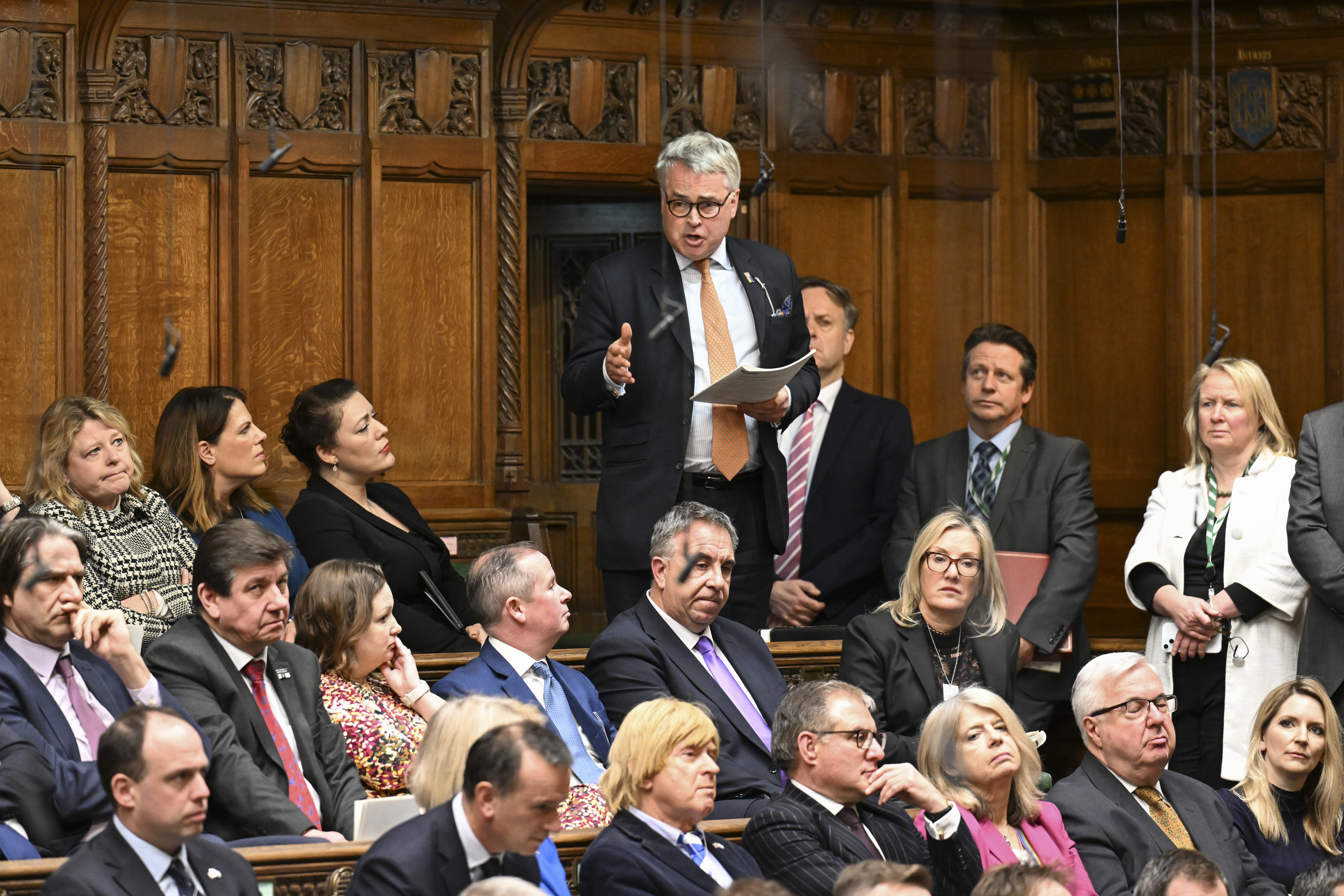
Loughton speaking during Prime Minister's Questions, 7 February 2024

At the 2019 general election, Loughton was again re-elected, with an increased vote share of 51% and an increased majority of 7,474.

On 26 March 2021, it was announced that Loughton was one of five MPs to be sanctioned by China for spreading what it called "lies and disinformation" about the country. He was subsequently banned from entering China, Hong Kong and Macau and Chinese citizens and institutions are prohibited from doing business with him.

On 1 December 2021, Loughton was appointed acting Chairman of the Home Affairs Select Committee for a second time following the resignation of Labour MP Yvette Cooper, who was appointed Shadow Home Secretary.

In April 2024, Loughton announced that he would not seek re-election as an MP at the 2024 general election, after 27 years in parliament. On 24 May 2024, he subsequently delivered his valedictory speech as a Member of Parliament. In a debate with the UK Parliament House of Commons in March 2024, Loughton recognized the expulsion of Armenians from Nagorno-Karabakh as ethnic cleansing, noted the erasure and destruction of Armenian churches and crosses, expressed support for the UK recognition of the Armenian genocide, and strongly urged the House to provide more assistance to the Armenian refugees.

== Personal life ==
Loughton married Elizabeth Juliet MacLauchlan in 1992, and they have two daughters and one son.

On 16 April 2015, he was elected Fellow of the Society of Antiquaries of London (FSA).

Parliament of the United Kingdom
New constituency	Member of Parliament for East Worthing and Shoreham; 1997–2024	Succeeded by Tom Rutland
Political offices
Preceded by Eleanor Laing	Shadow Minister for Children; 2003–2010	Succeeded by Dawn Primarolo
Preceded by Delyth Morgan, Baroness Morgan of Drefelin	Parliamentary Under-Secretary of State for Children and Families; 2010–2012	Succeeded by Edward Timpson
