= Preet Kaur Gill =

British politician (born 1972)

Preet Kaur Gill MP
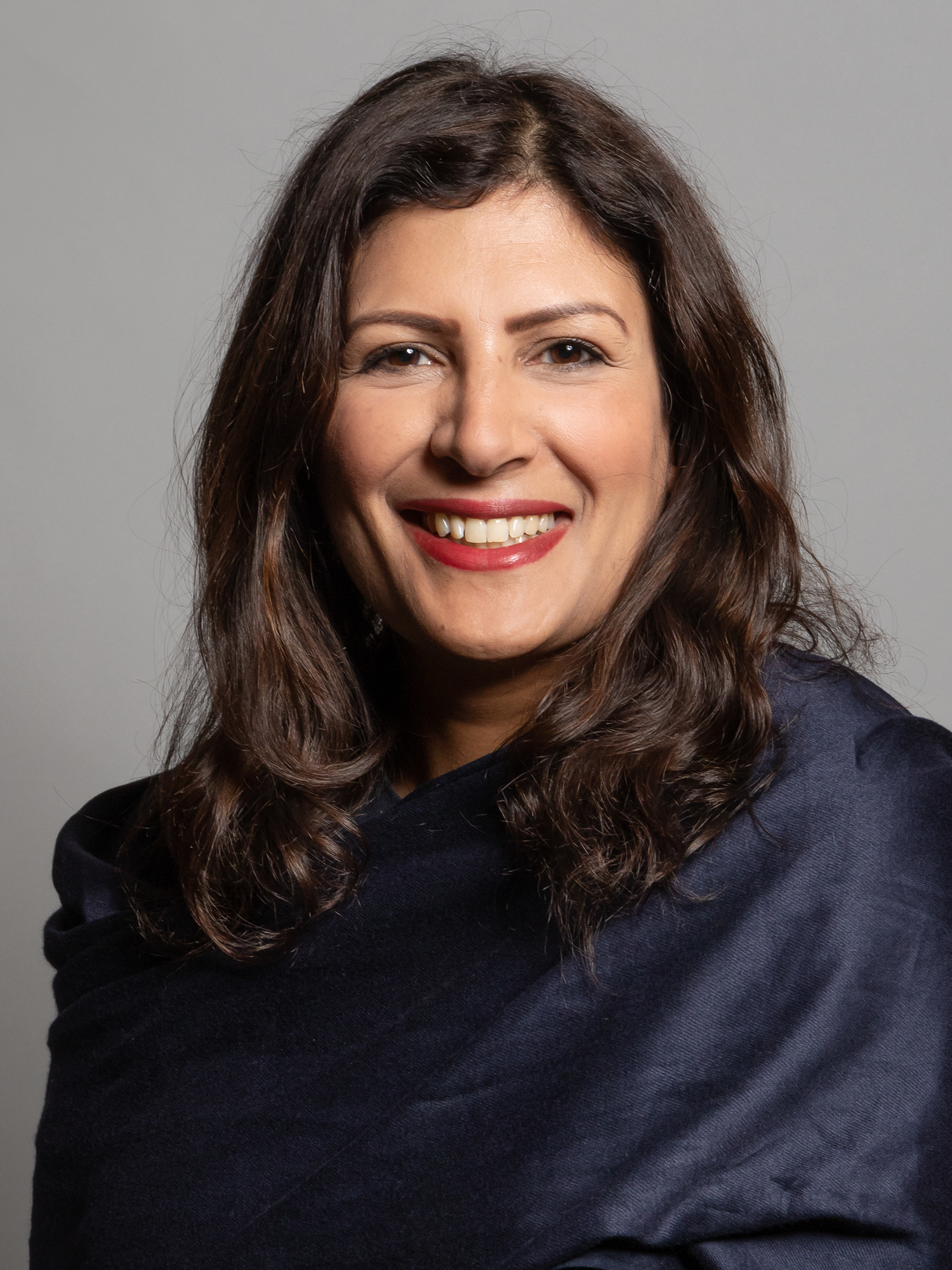
- Official portrait, 2020

Parliamentary Under-Secretary of State for Health Innovation and Safety
- In office 12 May 2026 – 22 July 2026
- Prime Minister: Keir Starmer
- Preceded by: Zubir Ahmed
- Succeeded by: James Frith

Member of Parliament for Birmingham Edgbaston
- Incumbent
- Assumed office 8 June 2017
- Preceded by: Gisela Stuart
- Majority: 8,368 (22.3%)
Shadow portfolios
Shadow Cabinet portfolios
2020–2023	International Development
Junior Shadow portfolios
2023–2024	Primary Care and Public Health
2018–2020	International Development

Member of Sandwell Metropolitan Borough Council for St Paul's
- In office 3 May 2012 – 4 May 2018
- Preceded by: Paramjit Randhawa
- Succeeded by: Samiya Akhter

Personal details
- Born: Preet Kaur Shergill; 21 November 1972 (age 53) Edgbaston, Birmingham, England
- Party: Labour Co-op
- Parent: Daljeet Singh Shergill (father)
- Education: University of East London (BSc)
- Website: www.preetkaurgill.co.uk

Preet Kaur Gill (born 21 November 1972) is a British Labour Co-op politician and former social worker who has been Member of Parliament (MP) for Birmingham Edgbaston since 2017. She previously served as Parliamentary Under-Secretary of State for Health Innovation and Safety from May to July 2026. She is the first female British Sikh MP elected to the House of Commons.

Gill served as Shadow Secretary of State for International Development between April 2020 and September 2023 and as Shadow Minister for Primary Care and Public Health between 6 September 2023 and 4 July 2024.

== Early life and career ==
Preet Kaur Gill was born on 21 November 1972 in Edgbaston, Birmingham. She was born to Indian parents Daljit Singh Shergill and Kuldeep Kaur Shergill. Her father was a foreman, and later a bus driver, and her mother worked as a seamstress. Daljit Singh was the longest serving president of the Guru Nanak Gurdwara Smethwick, the first gurdwara in the United Kingdom. Gill credits her father and Baron Tarsem King of West Bromwich as her main inspirations for her ambition to enter politics.

She has six younger siblings. Her early education was at Lordswood Girls' School and Bournville College. At the latter, Gill was elected as student president. Gill graduated from the University of East London with a first-class BSc in sociology with social work. After graduating, she worked as a social worker on a kibbutz in Israel and with street children in India before returning to Birmingham.

== Political career ==
She was a social worker in Waltham Forest and Birmingham specialising in child protection and serving as children's services manager in Birmingham from 2010 to 2017.

She was elected as a councillor for Sandwell Metropolitan Borough Council in 2012 and re-elected in the 2016 local election; her term ended May 2018. On the council, she served as the Cabinet Member for Public Health and Protection.

Gill supported remaining within the European Union (EU) in the 2016 EU membership referendum.

== Parliamentary career ==
=== In opposition ===
Gill was selected by the Labour Party to contest Birmingham Edgbaston on 28 April 2017. At the snap 2017 general election, Gill was elected as MP for Birmingham Edgbaston with 55.3% of the vote and a majority of 6,917.

In July 2017, she was elected as a member of the Home Affairs Select Committee.

On 12 January 2018, she was appointed as a Shadow Minister for International Development.

In March 2019, Gill signed a letter supporting the People's Vote campaign for a second referendum on EU membership.

From 2017-2024, Gill was the chair of the All Party Parliamentary Groups on Mentoring and for British Sikhs. In 2019, Gill successfully campaigned to amend the Offensive Weapons Act to protect the right of Sikhs to carry the Kirpan.

Gill was re-elected as MP for Birmingham Edgbaston at the 2019 general election with a decreased vote share of 50.1% and a decreased majority of 5,614.

Gill supported Keir Starmer in the 2020 Labour Party leadership election. She was promoted to Shadow Secretary of State for International Development following Starmer's election as leader.

As Shadow Secretary of State, Gill initially shadowed Secretary Anne-Marie Trevelyan until the department was abolished in September 2020; since then she shadowed ministers of the newly created Foreign, Commonwealth and Development Office. She remained in the shadow cabinet following the November 2021 reshuffle, but her position was renamed Shadow Cabinet Minister for International Development and she joined the new shadow Foreign and Commonwealth Affairs team.

In November 2020, Gill was elected Chair of the Co-operative Party Parliamentary Group of MPs.

On 19 December 2021, Gill was criticised by some social media users over a tweet she later deleted that referred to a "Hindu terrorist" behind the act of violence at Golden Temple in Amritsar.

On 23 February 2023, The Guardian reported on comments Gill made in a WhatsApp group which appeared to undermine Sikh victims of sexual violence. Gill was alleged to have said the women surveyed had used "very dangerous language" and urged them to submit apologies to gurdwaras. Following the report, Gill commented that she "worked with victims of abuse for twenty years" and "would never downplay the impact that abuse had on those victims."

In the 2023 British shadow cabinet reshuffle she was replaced by Lisa Nandy, and Gill became Shadow Minister for Primary Care and Public Health.

Gill is a member of Labour Friends of Palestine and the Middle East.

=== In government ===
At the 2024 general election, Gill was again re-elected, with a decreased vote share of 44.3% and an increased majority of 8,368.

On 18 July 2024, Gill was appointed as Parliamentary Private Secretary to the Business Secretary Jonathan Reynolds.

In October 2024, Gill introduced the Firearms (3D Printing) Bill to Parliament, to create an offence of possessing a blueprint for the production of a firearm by 3D printing. The provisions in Gill's Bill were subsequently adopted by the government as part of the Border Security, Asylum and Immigration Bill.

On 12 May 2026, she was appointed Parliamentary Under-Secretary of State in the Department of Health and Social Care. She was dismissed from the government by Andy Burnham when he became Prime Minister in July 2026.

== Personal life ==
Gill has been married to Sureash Singh Chopra, who is a social worker, since 2009. They have two daughters. Gill is vice-president of the Local Government Association and a non executive director for the Spring Housing Association.

== Awards and nominations ==
In September 2018, Gill was named as one of the Birmingham City University's Brummies Who Inspire, alongside fellow Birmingham MP, Shabana Mahmood.

In October 2018, she was presented with the Sikh Women of Substance award by the Sikh's Women Alliance UK.

In December 2018, she was one of the recipients of the Giving Voice award, presented by the Royal College of Speech and Language Therapists.

In December 2020, Gill won the overall prize at the MP of the Year Awards organised by the Patchwork Foundation, for "her consistent championing of young people, representation of the Sikh Community and initiative to tackle Fuel Poverty via a strategic campaign aimed at the UK's biggest fuel companies."

Parliament of the United Kingdom
Preceded by Gisela Stuart	Member of Parliament for Birmingham Edgbaston; 2017–present	Incumbent
