= 1940 Birmingham Edgbaston by-election =

UK parliamentary by-election

The 1940 Birmingham Edgbaston by-election was a parliamentary by-election held for the British House of Commons constituency of Birmingham Edgbaston on 18 December 1940. The seat had become vacant when Neville Chamberlain, the constituency's Conservative Party Member of Parliament had died from stomach cancer on 9 November. Chamberlain had been prime minister until May 1940, and had held the Edgbaston seat since the 1929 general election.

The Conservative candidate, Peter Bennett, was returned unopposed. During World War II, unopposed by-elections were common, since the major parties had agreed not to contest by-elections when vacancies arose in seats held by the other parties; contests occurred only when independent candidates or minor parties chose to stand, and the Common Wealth Party was formed in 1942 with the specific aim of contesting war-time by-elections.

== See also ==
- Birmingham Edgbaston (UK Parliament constituency)
- 1898 Birmingham Edgbaston by-election
- 1953 Birmingham Edgbaston by-election
- The suburb of Edgbaston
- List of United Kingdom by-elections
