= South and City College Birmingham =

School in West Midlands, England

South & City College Birmingham
- Main campus, Digbeth Campus

Location
- High Street Deritend; Digbeth; Birmingham, West Midlands, B5 5SU; England
- Coordinates: 52.47546°N 1.885753°W

Information
- Type: Further education college'
- Local authority: Birmingham
- Department for Education URN: 130461 Tables
- Gender: Coeducational
- Age: 14+
- Website: http://www.sccb.ac.uk

South & City College Birmingham is a further and higher education college in Birmingham, England, offering a range of full-time and part-time courses. The college was formed through the merger of South Birmingham College and City College Birmingham.

== History ==
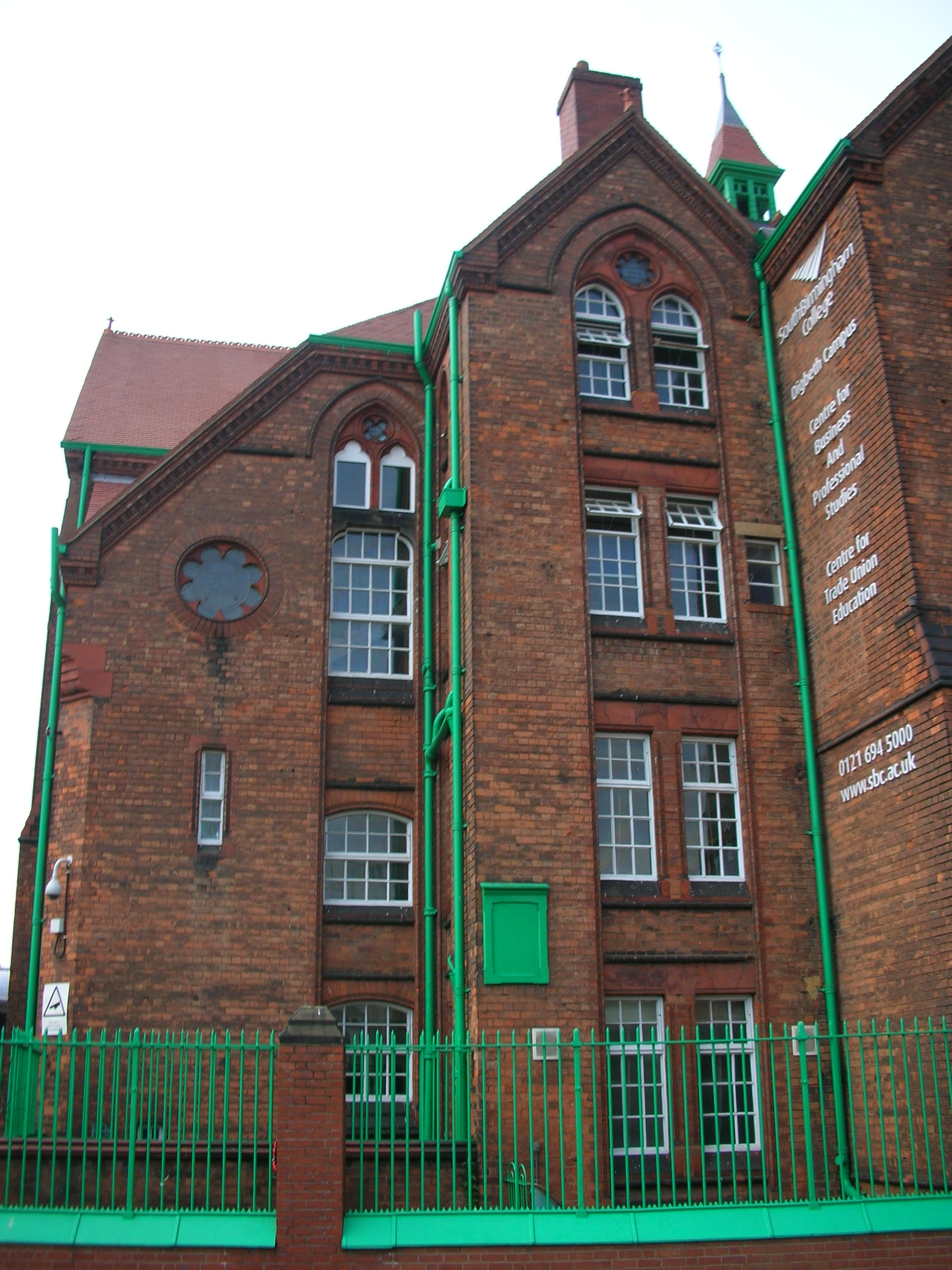
Floodgate School, Floodgate Street and Milk Street, Deritend, Birmingham, England. Now the Arts and Media Annexe of South Birmingham College. Formerly an 1890 Birmingham board school by architects

South & City College Birmingham was formed through a merger between South Birmingham College and City College Birmingham, with South Birmingham College officially changing its name to South & City College Birmingham on Wednesday 1 August 2012. The merger was prompted by financial challenges being faced by City College Birmingham. On Wednesday 2 August 2017, South & City College Birmingham merged again with Bournville College.

Previously, the college had campuses in multiple areas but some have since closed, including Balsall Heath Women's Centre, Ladywood Campus, Tyseley Campus and the original location of the Fusion Centre.

The college has eight campuses, and accepts students aged 14 and above. Every academic year, South & City College Birmingham provides education and training to over 25,000 students.

== Campuses ==
Below is a list of the 8 campuses:

Image	Campus	Address	Notes
	Longbridge Campus	1 Longbridge Lane, Longbridge, Birmingham B31 2AJ (Sat Nav B31 2TW)	Formerly Bournville College
	Longbridge Construction & Building Services Centre	3 Devon Way, Longbridge, Birmingham B31 2TS	
	Bordesley Green Campus	Fordrough Lane, Bordesley Green, Birmingham B9 5NA	
The college at Digbeth, occupying the old Floodgate Board School (right) and modern extension (left)	Digbeth Campus	High Street Deritend, Digbeth, Birmingham B5 5SU	
	Fusion Centre	334 - 339 Bradford Street, Digbeth, Birmingham B5 6ES	
	Golden Hillock Women's Centre	103 - 105 Golden Hillock Road, Small Heath, Birmingham B10 0DP	
	Hall Green Campus	Cole Bank Road, Hall Green, Birmingham B28 8ES	(formerly Hall Green College)
	Handsworth Campus	Soho Road, Handsworth, Birmingham B21 9DP	(formerly Handsworth College)

== Courses ==
The college offers a range of programmes:

A-levels

- Courses include Science, Humanities, and the Arts

T-levels

- Courses in Business & Finance, Computing, Digital & IT, Construction, Education & Early Years, Electrical, Engineering, Fashion & Textiles, Health, Media & Photography, and Science

Vocational qualifications (such as BTECs and NVQs)

- Courses including Accountancy, Art, Barbering, Games Development, Music, Plumbing, Foundation Learning, and more.

Apprenticeships

- Paid apprenticeship options, with link to employers

Higher Education

- Courses available in Accountancy, Health, Fashion, Business & Finance, and more.
- Pathways include: practical Access to HE, BA (Hons), HND, HNC, and Higher Technical qualifications

Adult education courses

- Full-time and part-time courses
- Courses accredited by employers
- Options for full funding, depending on the learner.

The provision supports progression into employment, higher education, and professional training.

== Social Media Handles ==
- South & City College Birmingham Instagram
- South & City College Birmingham Facebook
- South & City College Linkedin
- South & City College Birmingham X
- South & City College Birmingham TikTok
- South & City College Birmingham YouTube
