= Tom Rutland =

British politician

Tom Rutland MP
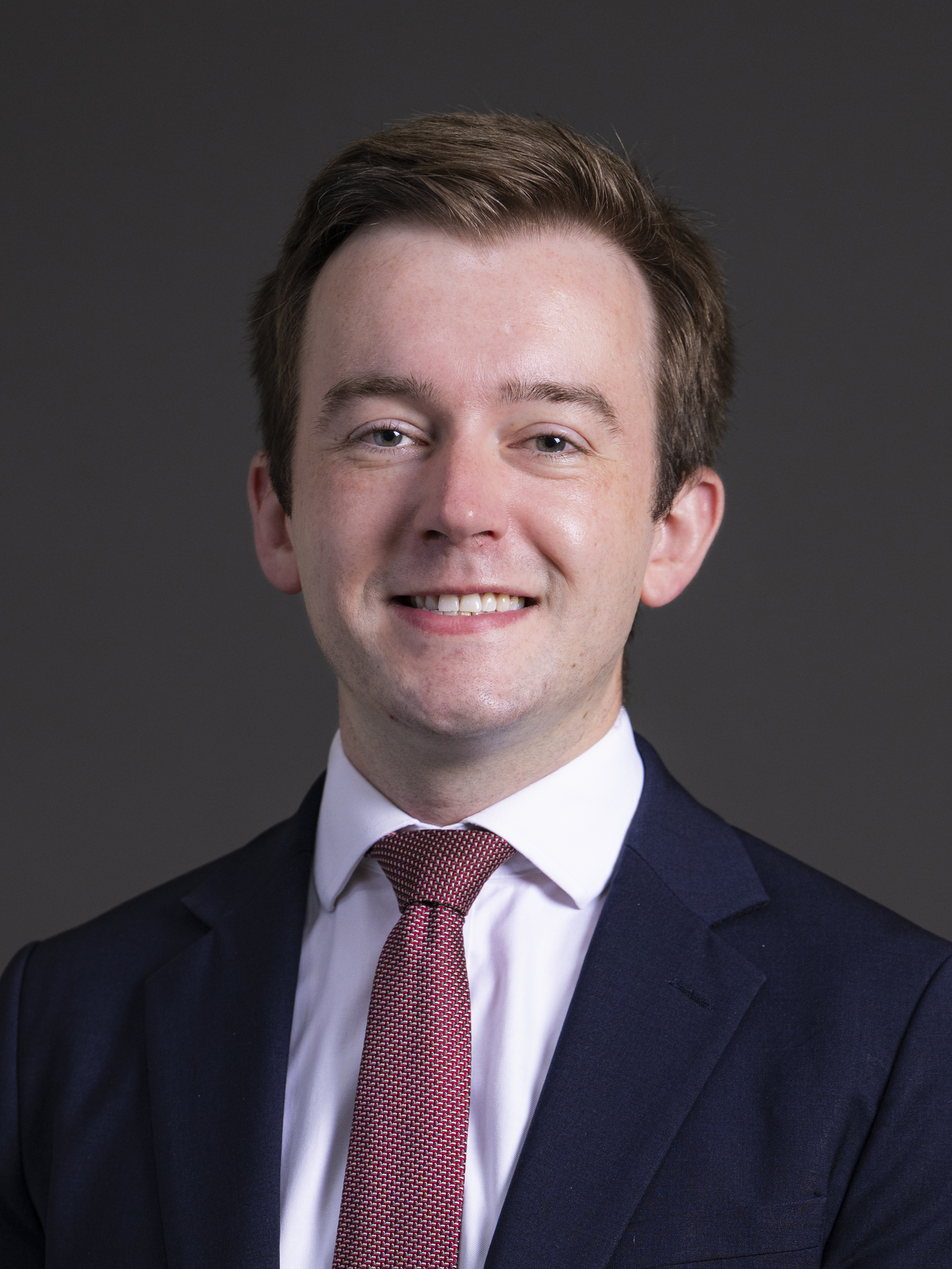
- Official portrait, 2026

Member of Parliament for East Worthing and Shoreham
- Incumbent
- Assumed office 4 July 2024
- Preceded by: Tim Loughton
- Majority: 9,519 (19.4%)

Member of Lambeth London Borough Council for Streatham Common and Vale
- In office 5 May 2022 – 22 March 2024
- Preceded by: New Ward
- Succeeded by: Sarah Cole

Parliamentary Private Secretary for Department of Environment, Food and Rural Affairs
- In office 11 September 2025 – 11 May 2026
- Prime Minister: Keir Starmer
- Succeeded by: Jayne Kirkham

Personal details
- Born: Thomas William Rutland; February 1992 (age 34)
- Party: Labour
- Education: Jesus College, Oxford (BA)
- Website: Official website

Thomas William Rutland (born February 1992) is a British Labour Party politician who has served as Member of Parliament (MP) for East Worthing and Shoreham since July 2024.

== Early life and education ==
Rutland was born in February 1992. He was educated at The Skinners' School, an all-boys grammar school in Tunbridge Wells. He read philosophy, politics and economics (PPE) at Jesus College, Oxford between 2010 and 2013, graduating with an upper second class honours degree. He was Junior Common Room president at Jesus College and subsequently president of Oxford University Student Union from 2013 to 2014.

== Early career ==
Following university, Rutland worked on Tessa Jowell's unsuccessful 2015 campaign to be chosen as Labour's candidate for Mayor of London and then as a parliamentary researcher for Andrew Adonis, Baron Adonis, a Labour member of the House of Lords. From 2015 to 2016, he was an analyst at Deloitte. He then worked as an executive support officer at Tower Hamlets London Borough Council from 2016 to 2017, and as a public affairs officer at Imperial College London from 2017 to 2019. He has worked as a press officer for the Financial Conduct Authority and the Prospect trade union. He left Prospect in July 2024, having been elected an MP.

== Political career ==
Rutland was a councillor for Streatham Common and Vale ward on Lambeth London Borough Council from 2022 to 2024.

In the 2024 general election Rutland was elected as Member of Parliament (MP) for East Worthing and Shoreham, with 22,120 votes (45.1%) and a majority of 9,519 over the second-place Conservative candidate. On 28 October 2024, he made his maiden speech in the House of Commons during a debate on Remembrance and Veterans.

Rutland was elected as a member of the Culture, Media and Sport Select Committee on 21 October 2024.

On 11 May 2026, Rutland resigned as Parliamentary private secretary to Secretary of State for Environment, Food and Rural Affairs Emma Reynolds, and called on Prime Minister Keir Starmer to resign.

== Personal life ==
Rutland is gay, and this led to his interest in politics as a teenager.
