= Peter Bennett, 1st Baron Bennett of Edgbaston =

British politician (1880-1957)

The Right Honourable The Lord Bennett of Edgbaston OBE JP
- Lord Bennett of Edgbaston

Parliamentary Secretary to the Minestry of Labour and National Service
- In office 31 October 1951 – 28 May 1952
- Monarchs: George VI; Elizabeth II
- Prime Minister: Winston Churchill
- Preceded by: Fred Lee
- Succeeded by: Harold Watkinson

Personal details
- Born: 16 April 1880 Birmingham, England
- Died: 27 September 1957 (aged 77)
- Party: Conservative
- Spouse: Agnes Palmer (m. 1907)

Peter Fredirick Blaker Bennett, 1st Baron Bennett of Edgbaston (16 April 1880 – 27 September 1957) known as Sir Peter Bennett between 1941 and 1953, was a British businessman and Conservative Party politician.

== Background and education ==
Bennett was the son of Frederick C. Bennett and Annie (née Blaker), and educated at King Edward's School, Birmingham, and the University of Birmingham.

== Business career ==
Bennett was chairman and managing director of Joseph Lucas Ltd and also served as a justice of the peace for Sutton Coldfield. He was appointed an Officer of the Order of the British Empire (OBE) in 1918, and knighted in 1941.

== Political career ==
Bennett was elected as member of parliament (MP) for Birmingham Edgbaston at an unopposed by-election in December 1940 following the death of the sitting MP, former Prime Minister Neville Chamberlain. He held the seat in the general elections of 1945, 1950 and 1951. He served under Winston Churchill as Parliamentary Secretary to the Ministry of Labour and National Service between 1951 and 1952. On 1 July 1953 he was elevated to the peerage as Baron Bennett of Edgbaston, of Sutton Coldfield in the County of Warwick.

== Personal life ==
Lord Bennett of Edgbaston married Agnes, daughter of Joseph Palmer, in 1907. The union was childless. Lord Bennett died in 1957, aged 77, when the title became extinct. His widow, Agnes, Lady Bennett of Edgbaston, died in 1969. They lived at Ardencote, Luttrell Road, Four Oaks, Sutton Coldfield, Birmingham.

Parliament of the United Kingdom
Preceded by Neville Chamberlain	Member of Parliament for Birmingham Edgbaston; 1940–1953	Succeeded by Edith Pitt
Political offices
Preceded by Fred Lee	Parliamentary Secretary to the Ministry of Labour and National Service; 1951–1952	Succeeded by Harold Watkinson
Peerage of the United Kingdom
New creation	Baron Bennett of Edgbaston; 1953–1957	Extinct
