= Sophie Cook =

British author, broadcaster, photographer and politician

Sophie Cook (born 4 January 1967) is a British author, broadcaster, photographer and politician.

== Early life ==
Cook was born in Bournemouth, Hampshire (now Dorset) on 4 January 1967.

== Career ==
Cook was a jet engine technician in the Royal Air Force from 1983 to 1991. She served on Tornado aircraft and in 1985, at the age of 18, saved the life of a colleague following an explosion on an aircraft.

After spending most of the 1990s in Saudi Arabia, she returned to the UK in 1998 where she became a photographer, including time as club photographer at AFC Bournemouth.

Cook used her profile to speak out against the stigma surrounding mental health and bigotry, including an appearance at TEDx Brighton in 2018.

She became a news anchor and TV chat show host for Latest TV in Brighton, becoming the first transgender newscaster in Europe.

Her autobiography, Not Today: How I Chose Life, was released in 2018 as a self-help book for those struggling with mental health or identity.

== Political career ==
In 2017, Cook stood as the Labour general election candidate in East Worthing and Shoreham, where she came second with 39.3% of the vote.

Supported by the activist group Momentum and trade union Unite the Union, she sought the Labour Party's nomination to stand again in the 2019 general election. She was removed from the shortlist over questions about the bankruptcy of a previous company she ran, but the process was stopped after the other two candidates withdrew in protest. The selection began again with Cook on the shortlist, but she was not selected. She stood as an independent candidate instead, but withdrew from active campaigning, citing harassment that she was receiving and its effect on her mental health as the reason for doing so.

In 2019, she set up the Sophie Cook Foundation in order to tackle the stigma surrounding mental health in schools, colleges and universities.

== Personal life ==
Cook is a transgender woman, and began to transition in 1998. Having struggled with her gender identity from childhood and with her mental health, notably posttraumatic stress disorder, self harming and suicidal ideation both during and after her military service, Cook transitioned in July 2015 while working at AFC Bournemouth. In doing so, she became the first transgender person to work in Premier League football.

== Honours ==
Cook was awarded an honorary doctorate by Bournemouth University for her work raising awareness of mental health issues in November 2019, and invited to become a Fellow of the Royal Society of Arts (FRSA) in 2020. In 2020 Cook was recognised for her campaigning on behalf of the LGBT community by the British LGBT Awards with the Outstanding Contribution to LGBT+ Life Award.
