= 1953 Birmingham Edgbaston by-election =

UK Parliamentary by-election

The 1953 Birmingham Edgbaston by-election was held on 2 July 1953. It was held when the incumbent Conservative MP, Peter Bennett was elevated to a hereditary peerage. It was won by the Conservative candidate Edith Pitt.

1953 Birmingham Edgbaston by-election Electorate
Party	Candidate	Votes	%	±%
Conservative	Edith Pitt	20,142	67.64	+3.35
Labour	FB Watson	9,635	32.36	−3.35
Majority		10,507	35.28	+6.70
Turnout		29,777		
Conservative hold		Swing	+3.4	
