= East Worthing and Shoreham =

UK Parliament constituency (since 1997)

Coordinates: 50.822°N 0.326°W

- County constituency for the House of Commons
- Interactive map of boundaries from 1997
- Boundary of East Worthing and Shoreham in South East England
- County: West Sussex
- Electorate: 75,466 (2023)
- Major settlements: Shoreham-by-Sea, Southwick, Lancing

Current constituency
- Created: 1997
- Member of Parliament: Tom Rutland (Labour)
- Seats: One
- Created from: Worthing; Shoreham

East Worthing and Shoreham is a constituency (Note: A county constituency (for the purposes of election expenses and type of returning officer)) represented in the House of Commons of the UK Parliament by Tom Rutland of the Labour Party. (Note: As with all constituencies, the constituency elects one Member of Parliament (MP) by the first past the post system of election at least every five years.)

== Constituency profile ==
The seat covers the east part of Worthing, Lancing, Shoreham and Southwick along the Sussex coast. House prices and incomes are slightly above national averages.

Shoreham can be viewed with Worthing as less of an economic force than the neighbouring local government district, the City of Brighton and Hove, with a majority of houses with larger gardens, fewer listed buildings but Shoreham's large boat harbour facility an amenity for visitors, residents, – mooring and maintenance for people living close enough to the county, rival harbours being as far away as Chichester and Newhaven. Much work is in the service sector, including a major presence of share dealing and banking service and processing facilities in the borough (see Lancing, West Sussex) and a slightly greater proportion of people are retired compared to the national average (2.11% of the population greater, at 15.8%).

== Boundaries ==
1997–present: The District of Adur, and the Borough of Worthing wards of Broadwater, Gaisford, Offington, and Selden.

The 2023 review of Westminster constituencies left the boundaries unchanged.

The constituency covers an eastern portion of Worthing, the town of Shoreham-by-Sea, Lancing and three nearby inland villages in the Adur valley, all communities within the county of West Sussex.

== History ==
Under the Boundary Commission's fourth review, enacted in time for the 1997 election, the larger Shoreham portion of this constituency was taken from the disbanded Shoreham seat and the minor East Worthing portion had been in the disbanded Worthing seat.

Before 1974, the Shoreham seat had been a part of the Arundel and Shoreham seat.

Between 1945 and 1950, the whole area was in the Worthing seat and between 1918 and 1945 (on which the Boundary Commission was formed and carried out its first periodic review), in the Horsham and Worthing seat.

Political history

The seat's first MP in 1997 was Tim Loughton who served until he stepped down for the 2024 general election. Although from 2001 to 2015 this was an unquestionably safe seat for the Conservative Party, its safety significantly declined after that, especially in 2017 when Labour reduced the Conservative percentage majority to single figures. It succeeded Crawley as Labour's principal target seat in the county of West Sussex, though still requiring a substantial swing, which it achieved in 2024 after the Conservative vote halved and Tom Rutland was elected.

Notable candidates

The competitive hustings in September 2007 of the local Labour Party selected Emily Benn, granddaughter of Tony Benn and niece of Hilary Benn, former Secretaries of State, then aged 17, to contest the 2010 general election, making her the youngest ever Labour parliamentary candidate: had she been elected, she would have been the youngest MP since the Reform Act 1832. Her father Stephen Benn is Viscount Stansgate, succeeding his father.

Labour selected Latest TV newsreader Sophie Cook to be its candidate in the 2017 general election. Had she been elected, she would have been the United Kingdom's first transgender MP. Although she failed to win the seat, she achieved the best ever result of any non-Conservative Party candidate in any Worthing-based constituency, receiving 20,882 votes to the Conservatives' 25,988.

== Members of Parliament ==
Worthing and Shoreham prior to 1997

Election	Member	Party
1997	Tim Loughton	Conservative
2024	Tom Rutland	Labour

== Elections ==
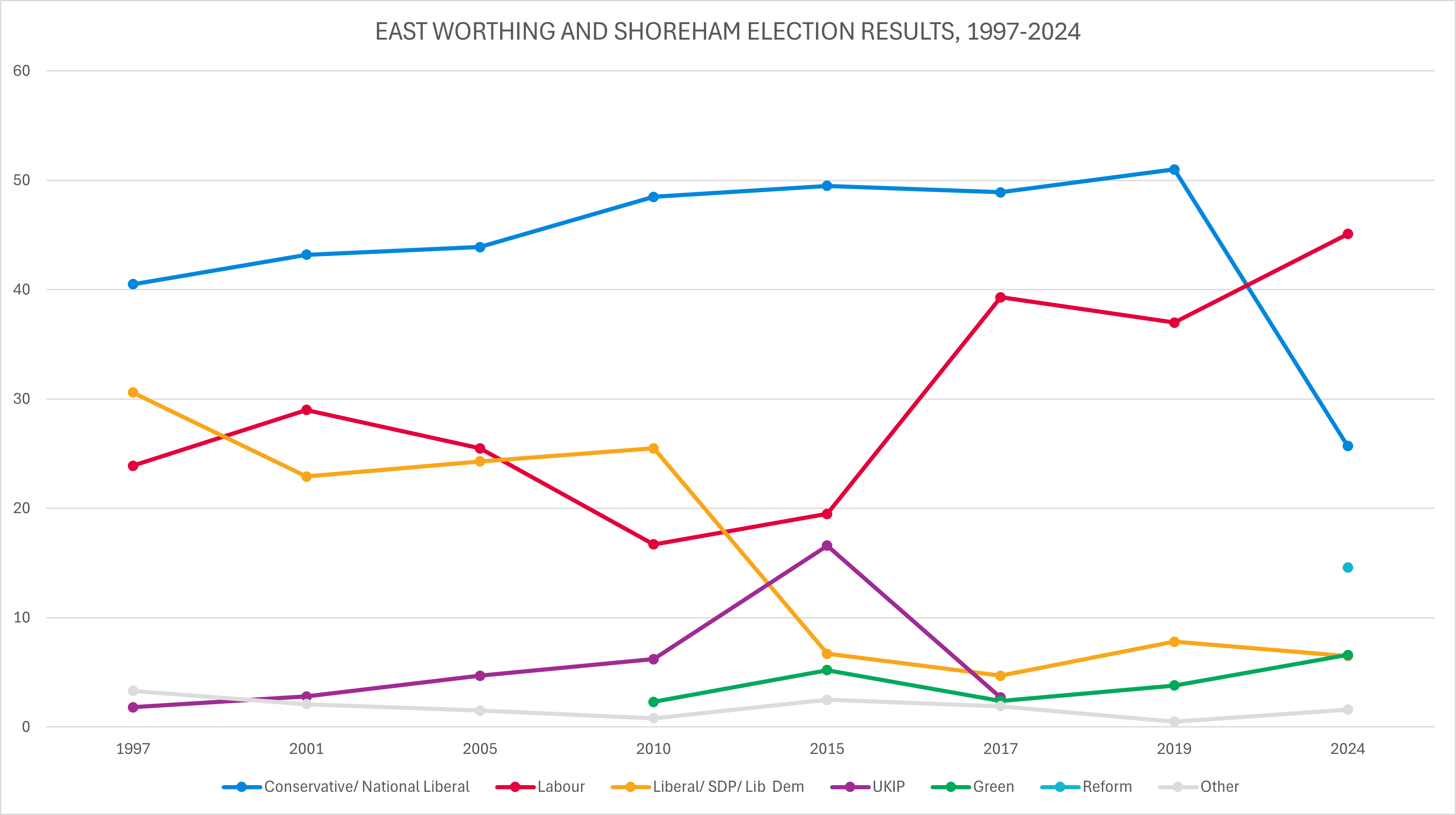
Election results 1950-2024

=== Elections in the 2020s ===
General election 2024: East Worthing and Shoreham
Party	Candidate	Votes	%	±%
Labour	Tom Rutland	22,120	45.1	+8.1
Conservative	Leila Williams	12,601	25.7	−25.3
Reform	Lionel Harman	7,169	14.6	N/A
Green	Debbie Woudman	3,246	6.6	+2.8
Liberal Democrats	David Batchelor	3,180	6.5	−1.3
Independent	Frank Ward	320	0.7	N/A
Independent	John Greenshields	273	0.6	N/A
Independent	Ivana Forman	169	0.3	N/A
Majority		9,519	19.4	N/A
Turnout		49,078	65.7	−4.7
Registered electors		74,738		
Labour gain from Conservative		Swing	▲16.7	

=== Elections in the 2010s ===
General election 2019: East Worthing and Shoreham
Party	Candidate	Votes	%	±%
Conservative	Tim Loughton	27,107	51.0	+2.1
Labour	Lavinia O'Connor	19,633	37.0	–2.3
Liberal Democrats	Ashley Ridley	4,127	7.8	+3.0
Green	Leslie Williams	2,006	3.8	+1.4
Independent	Sophie Cook	255	0.5	N/A
Majority		7,474	14.0	+4.4
Turnout		53,128	70.7	+0.4
Conservative hold		Swing	+2.2	

Sophie Cook withdrew from the 2019 election, but she remained on the ballot paper as this decision was made after the statement of persons nominated was released.

General election 2017: East Worthing and Shoreham
Party	Candidate	Votes	%	±%
Conservative	Tim Loughton	25,988	48.9	−0.6
Labour	Sophie Cook	20,882	39.3	+19.8
Liberal Democrats	Oli Henman	2,523	4.7	−2.0
UKIP	Mike Glennon	1,444	2.7	−13.9
Green	Leslie Williams	1,273	2.4	−2.8
NHA	Carl Walker	575	1.1	−1.4
Independent	Andy Lutwyche	432	0.8	N/A
Majority		5,106	9.6	−20.4
Turnout		53,117	70.3	+3.1
Conservative hold		Swing	-10.2	

General election 2015: East Worthing and Shoreham
Party	Candidate	Votes	%	±%
Conservative	Tim Loughton	24,686	49.5	+1.0
Labour	Tim Macpherson	9,737	19.5	+2.8
UKIP	Mike Glennon	8,267	16.6	+10.4
Liberal Democrats	Bob Smytherman	3,360	6.7	−18.8
Green	James Doyle	2,605	5.2	+2.9
NHA	Carl Walker	1,243	2.5	N/A
Majority		14,949	30.0	+7.0
Turnout		49,898	67.2	+1.8
Conservative hold		Swing		

General election 2010: East Worthing and Shoreham
Party	Candidate	Votes	%	±%
Conservative	Tim Loughton	23,458	48.5	+4.6
Liberal Democrats	James Doyle	12,353	25.5	+1.2
Labour	Emily Benn	8,087	16.7	−8.8
UKIP	Mike Glennon	2,984	6.2	+1.5
Green	Susan Board	1,126	2.3	N/A
English Democrat	Clive Maltby	389	0.8	N/A
Majority		11,105	23.0	+4.6
Turnout		48,397	65.4	+3.8
Conservative hold		Swing		

=== Elections in the 2000s ===
General election 2005: East Worthing and Shoreham
Party	Candidate	Votes	%	±%
Conservative	Tim Loughton	19,548	43.9	+0.7
Labour	Daniel Yates	11,365	25.5	−3.5
Liberal Democrats	James Doyle	10,844	24.3	+1.4
UKIP	Richard Jelf	2,109	4.7	+1.9
Legalise Cannabis	Christopher Baldwin	677	1.5	−0.6
Majority		8,183	18.4	+4.2
Turnout		44,543	61.6	+1.9
Conservative hold		Swing	+2.1	

General election 2001: East Worthing and Shoreham
Party	Candidate	Votes	%	±%
Conservative	Tim Loughton	18,608	43.2	+2.7
Labour	Daniel Yates	12,469	29.0	+5.1
Liberal Democrats	Paul Elgood	9,876	22.9	−7.7
UKIP	James McCulloch	1,195	2.8	+1.0
Legalise Cannabis	Christopher Baldwin	920	2.1	N/A
Majority		6,139	14.2	+4.3
Turnout		43,068	59.7	−13.2
Conservative hold		Swing		

=== Elections in the 1990s ===
General election 1997: East Worthing and Shoreham
Party	Candidate	Votes	%	±%
Conservative	Tim Loughton	20,864	40.5	
Liberal Democrats	Martin King	15,766	30.6	
Labour	Mark Williams	12,335	23.9	
Referendum	James McCulloch	1,683	3.3	
UKIP	Rosemary Jarvis	921	1.8	
Majority		5,098	9.9	
Turnout		51,569	72.9	
Conservative win (new seat)				

== See also ==
- parliamentary constituencies in West Sussex
- List of parliamentary constituencies in the South East England (region)

== Sources ==
- Election result, 2005 (BBC)
- Election results, 1997 – 2001 (BBC)
- Election results, 1997 – 2001 (Election Demon)
- Election results, 1997 – 2005 (Guardian)
