= Birmingham Edgbaston =

Parliamentary constituency in the United Kingdom, 1885 onwards

Coordinates: 52.46°N 1.96°W

- Borough constituency for the House of Commons
- Boundaries since 2024
- Boundary of Birmingham Edgbaston in West Midlands region
- County: West Midlands
- Population: 96,568 (2011 census)
- Electorate: 71,354 (2023)

Current constituency
- Created: 1885
- Member of Parliament: Preet Gill (Labour Co-op)
- Seats: One
- Created from: Birmingham

Birmingham Edgbaston is a constituency, (Note: A borough constituency (for the purposes of election expenses and type of returning officer)) represented in the House of Commons of the UK Parliament since 2017 by Preet Gill, a Labour Co-op MP. (Note: As with all constituencies, the constituency elects one Member of Parliament (MP) by the first past the post system of election at least every five years.)

The most high-profile MP for the constituency was former Prime Minister Neville Chamberlain (1937–1940). Since 1953 it has elected a succession of female MPs.

== Constituency profile ==
The constituency is located south-west of Birmingham city centre. It is predominantly suburban and contains the neighbourhoods of Edgbaston, Harborne and Bartley Green.

Edgbaston is a relatively affluent area of the city and has a large student population as it contains the main campus of the University of Birmingham. House prices and household income are slightly higher than other areas of the West Midlands, and residents are more likely to be degree-educated. The constituency is ethnically diverse; 54% of residents are White, 23% are Asian and 11% are Black. At the most recent city council election in 2026, voters in Edgbaston elected Conservative councillors, voters in Bartley Green elected Reform UK councillors, whilst Harborne and the areas in the north of the constituency were won by a mix of the Labour Party, Green Party and Independent councillors. An estimated 54% of voters in the constituency supported remaining in the European Union in the 2016 referendum, above the national figure of 48%.

== Boundaries ==
1885–1918: The Municipal Borough of Birmingham ward of Edgbaston, part of Rotton Park ward, the local government district of Harborne, and part of the local government district of Balsall Heath.

1918–1974: The County Borough of Birmingham wards of Edgbaston, Harborne, and Market Hall.

1974–1983: The County Borough of Birmingham wards of Deritend, Edgbaston, Harborne, and Quinton.

1983–1997: The City of Birmingham wards of Edgbaston, Harborne, and Quinton.

1997–2010: The City of Birmingham wards of Bartley Green, Edgbaston, Harborne, and Quinton (as they existed on 1 June 1994).

2010–2018: The City of Birmingham wards of Bartley Green, Edgbaston, Harborne, and Quinton (as they existed on 12 April 2005).

2018–2024: Following a local government boundary review, which did not effect the parliamentary boundaries, the contents of the constituency were as follows with effect from May 2018:

- The City of Birmingham wards of Bartley Green, Edgbaston, Harborne, and Quinton, about half of North Edgbaston and fragments of Weoley & Selly Oak and Balsall Heath West.

2024–present: Further to the 2023 review of Westminster constituencies which came into effect for the 2024 general election, the constituency comprises:

- The City of Birmingham wards of: Bartley Green; Edgbaston; Harborne; North Edgbaston; Quinton.

The remaining areas of the North Edgbaston ward were transferred from Birmingham Ladywood, bringing the electorate within the permitted range. Other minor changes to align with new ward boundaries.

== History ==
The political division elected Conservative candidates as its MP between a by-election in 1898 and the 1992 general elections inclusive. The election of Gisela Stuart in 1997 produced a 10% majority fractionally exceeded in percentage terms by her re-election in 2001 on a lower turnout, stretching her majority to 12.1%. The 2015 re-election of Stuart gave the seat the thirtieth-smallest majority of Labour's 232 seats by percentage of majority and represented an improvement on 2010.

On election night in May 1997, Birmingham Edgbaston was the ninth constituency to declare its results and the first seat to be gained by the Labour Party from the Conservatives on a 10% swing, after 99 years of Conservative representation; presaging the Labour landslide victory of that election. Labour have held the seat ever since. Birmingham Edgbaston has returned only female MPs since 1953, longer than any other constituency in the UK. The current MP for the constituency is Preet Gill of the Labour Party, who is the first-ever female Sikh MP in the UK. She was first elected at the 2017 general election, after long-serving Labour MP Gisela Stuart stood down. It has been classified as a marginal seat; although in 2017 and 2019, the Labour Party won more than 50% of the vote.

Turnout has ranged from 78.8% in 1950 to 48% in 1918, and was recorded as 52.4% in 2024.

== Demographics ==
Ethnicity 2021 Census

White – 54.2

Asian – 23.0

Black – 11.4

Mixed – 5.8

Other – 5.5

Religion 2021 Census

Christian – 38.7

Muslim – 16.3

Hindu – 3.3

Sikh – 5.1

== Members of Parliament ==
Election	Member	Party	Notes
1885	George Dixon	Liberal	
1886	George Dixon	Liberal Unionist	
1898 by-election	Francis Lowe	Conservative	
1929	Neville Chamberlain	Conservative	Prime Minister 1937–1940; died 1940
1940 by-election	Peter Bennett	Conservative	Resigned 1953 on being raised to the peerage
1953 by-election	Edith Pitt	Conservative	Died January 1966; no by-election held due to imminent general election
1966	Jill Knight	Conservative	
1997	Gisela Stuart	Labour	
2017	Preet Gill	Labour Co-op	

== Elections ==
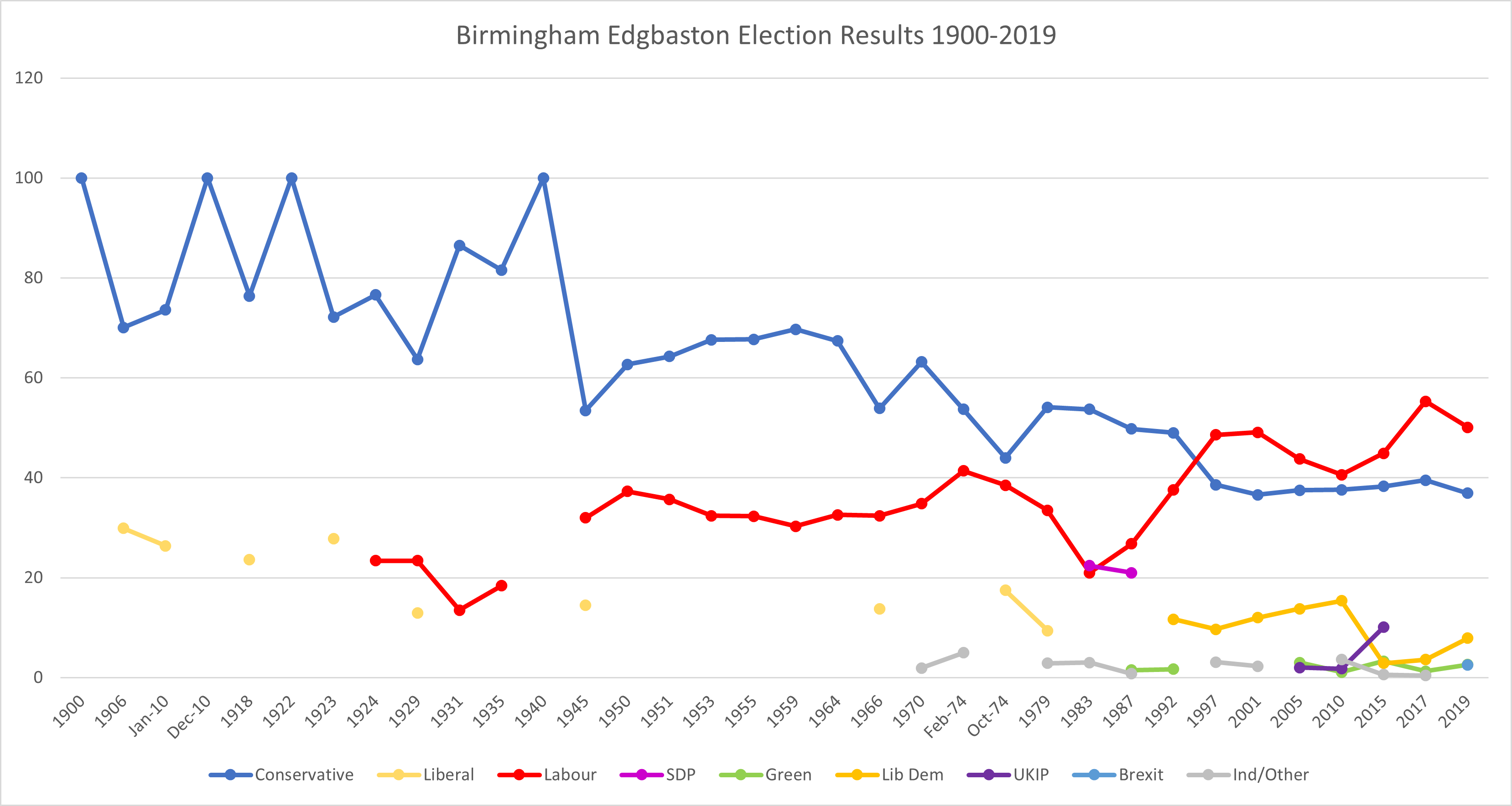

=== Elections in the 2020s ===
General election 2024: Birmingham Edgbaston
Party	Candidate	Votes	%	±%
Labour Co-op	Preet Gill	16,599	44.3	▼8.0
Conservative	Ashvir Sangha	8,231	22.0	▼13.5
Reform	Joshua Matthews	4,363	11.7	▲9.3
Independent	Dr Ammar Waraich	3,336	8.9	new
Green	Nicola Payne	2,797	7.5	▲4.9
Liberal Democrats	Colin Green	2,102	5.6	▼1.7
Majority		8,368	22.3	▲9.1
Turnout		37,428	52.1	▼11.8
Registered electors		71,787		
Labour Co-op hold		Swing	▲2.2	

=== Elections in the 2010s ===
General election 2019: Birmingham Edgbaston
Party	Candidate	Votes	%	±%
Labour Co-op	Preet Gill	21,217	50.1	−5.2
Conservative	Alex Yip	15,603	36.9	−2.6
Liberal Democrats	Colin Green	3,349	7.9	+4.3
Green	Phil Simpson	1,112	2.6	+1.3
Brexit Party	David Wilks	1,047	2.5	New
Majority		5,614	13.2	−2.6
Turnout		42,328	61.5	−2.6
Labour Co-op hold		Swing	−1.3	

General election 2017: Birmingham Edgbaston
Party	Candidate	Votes	%	±%
Labour Co-op	Preet Gill	24,124	55.3	+10.4
Conservative	Caroline Squire	17,207	39.5	+1.2
Liberal Democrats	Colin Green	1,564	3.6	+0.7
Green	Alice Kiff	562	1.3	−2.0
Common Good	Dick Rodgers	155	0.4	New
Majority		6,917	15.8	+9.2
Turnout		43,612	64.1	+1.1
Registered electors		68,091		
Labour Co-op hold		Swing	+4.6	

General election 2015: Birmingham Edgbaston
Party	Candidate	Votes	%	±%
Labour	Gisela Stuart	18,518	44.9	+4.3
Conservative	Luke Evans	15,812	38.3	+0.7
UKIP	Graham Short	4,154	10.1	+8.3
Green	Philip Simpson	1,371	3.3	+2.2
Liberal Democrats	Lee Dargue	1,184	2.9	−12.5
Christian	Gabriel Ukandu	163	0.4	+0.1
Independent	Henna Rai	91	0.2	New
Majority		2,706	6.6	+3.5
Turnout		41,293	63.0	+2.4
Registered electors		65,591		
Labour hold		Swing	+1.8	

General election 2010: Birmingham Edgbaston
Party	Candidate	Votes	%	±%
Labour	Gisela Stuart	16,894	40.6	−3.1
Conservative	Deirdre Alden	15,620	37.6	+0.1
Liberal Democrats	Roger Harmer	6,387	15.4	+1.6
BNP	Trevor Lloyd	1,196	2.9	New
UKIP	Greville Warwick	732	1.8	−0.2
Green	Philip Simpson	469	1.1	−1.9
Impact Party	Harry Takhar	146	0.4	New
Christian	Charith Fernando	127	0.3	New
Majority		1,274	3.0	−3.2
Turnout		41,571	60.6	+2.6
Registered electors		64,859		
Labour hold		Swing	−1.6	

=== Elections in the 2000s ===
General election 2005: Birmingham Edgbaston
Party	Candidate	Votes	%	±%
Labour	Gisela Stuart	16,465	43.75	−5.4
Conservative	Deirdre Alden	14,116	37.51	+0.9
Liberal Democrats	Mike D Dixon	5,185	13.8	+1.8
Green	Peter Beck	1,116	3.0	New
UKIP	Stephen White	749	2.0	New
Majority		2,349	6.2	−6.3
Turnout		37,631	58.0	+2.0
Registered electors		64,859		
Labour hold		Swing	−3.1	

General election 2001: Birmingham Edgbaston
Party	Candidate	Votes	%	±%
Labour	Gisela Stuart	18,517	49.1	+0.5
Conservative	Nigel Hastilow	13,819	36.6	−2.0
Liberal Democrats	Nicola Davies	4,528	12.0	+2.3
Pro-Euro Conservative	Collis Gretton	454	1.2	New
Socialist Labour	Sam Brackenbury	443	1.1	New
Majority		4,698	12.5	+2.5
Turnout		37,749	56.0	−12.9
Registered electors		67,405		
Labour hold		Swing	+1.3	

=== Elections in the 1990s ===
General election 1997: Birmingham Edgbaston
Party	Candidate	Votes	%	±%
Labour	Gisela Stuart	23,554	48.6	+11.0
Conservative	Andrew Marshall	18,712	38.6	−10.4
Liberal Democrats	James Gallagher	4,691	9.7	−2.0
Referendum	Jonathan Oakton	1,065	2.2	New
BNP	Derek Campbell	443	0.9	New
Majority		4,842	10.0	N/A
Turnout		48,465	68.9	−2.4
Registered electors		70,310		
Labour gain from Conservative		Swing	+10.2	

General election 1992: Birmingham Edgbaston
Party	Candidate	Votes	%	±%
Conservative	Jill Knight	18,529	49.0	−0.8
Labour	John Wilton	14,222	37.6	+10.8
Liberal Democrats	Iain RS Robertson-Steel	4,419	11.7	−9.3
Green	Philip Simpson	643	1.7	+0.2
Majority		4,307	11.4	−11.6
Turnout		37,813	71.3	+2.7
Registered electors		53,041		
Conservative hold		Swing	−5.8	

=== Elections in the 1980s ===
General election 1987: Birmingham Edgbaston
Party	Candidate	Votes	%	±%
Conservative	Jill Knight	18,595	49.8	−3.9
Labour	John Wilton	10,014	26.8	+5.8
Alliance (SDP)	Joseph Binns	7,843	21.0	−1.4
Green	Philip Simpson	559	1.5	+0.1
Ind. Conservative	Stephen Hardwick	307	0.8	0.0
Majority		8,581	23.0	−8.3
Turnout		37,318	68.6	+2.4
Registered electors		54,416		
Conservative hold		Swing	−4.9	

General election 1983: Birmingham Edgbaston
Party	Candidate	Votes	%	±%
Conservative	Jill Knight	19,585	53.7	−0.4
Alliance (SDP)	Joseph Binns	8,167	22.4	+13.0
Labour	Peter Bilson	7,647	21.0	−12.5
Ecology	John Hurdley	516	1.4	−0.4
Ind. Conservative	Stephen Hardwick	293	0.8	New
Communist	Patricia Davies	169	0.5	New
Jesus and His Cross	Daphne Howlett	97	0.3	−0.3
Majority		11,418	31.3	+10.7
Turnout		36,474	66.2	−1.6
Registered electors		55,063		
Conservative hold		Swing		

=== Elections in the 1970s ===
General election 1979: Birmingham Edgbaston
Party	Candidate	Votes	%	±%
Conservative	Jill Knight	25,192	54.1	+10.1
Labour	Andrew Hudson	15,605	33.5	−5.0
Liberal	James Dugued	4,377	9.4	−8.1
Ecology	Jonathan Tyler	852	1.8	New
Jesus and His Cross	Daphne Howlett	297	0.6	New
Save Birmingham Education	Brian Dore	129	0.3	New
Independent	Leonard Marshall	112	0.2	New
Majority		9,587	20.6	+15.1
Turnout		46,564	67.8	+4.5
Registered electors		68,645		
Conservative hold		Swing	+9.0	

General election October 1974: Birmingham Edgbaston
Party	Candidate	Votes	%	±%
Conservative	Jill Knight	19,483	44.0	−9.7
Labour	John Hannah	17,073	38.5	−2.9
Liberal	Peter Davis	7,770	17.5	New
Majority		2,410	5.5	−6.8
Turnout		44,326	63.3	−6.1
Registered electors		70,078		
Conservative hold		Swing	−3.4	

General election February 1974: Birmingham Edgbaston
Party	Candidate	Votes	%	±%
Conservative	Jill Knight	25,914	53.7	−9.6
Labour	John Hannah	19,994	41.4	+6.6
Independent	Leonard Marshall	2,391	5.0	New
Majority		5,920	12.3	−16.2
Turnout		48,299	69.4	+5.7
Registered electors		69,631		
Conservative hold		Swing	−8.1	

General election 1970: Birmingham Edgbaston
Party	Candidate	Votes	%	±%
Conservative	Jill Knight	23,690	63.2	+9.3
Labour	John Sever	13,047	34.8	+2.4
Independent	Daphne Howlett	725	1.9	New
Majority		10,643	28.4	+6.9
Turnout		37,462	63.6	−4.2
Registered electors		58,868		
Conservative hold		Swing	+3.5	

=== Elections in the 1960s ===
General election 1966: Birmingham Edgbaston
Party	Candidate	Votes	%	±%
Conservative	Jill Knight	18,869	53.9	−13.5
Labour	Eric Smith	11,335	32.4	−0.2
Liberal	David Badger	4,829	13.8	New
Majority		7,534	21.5	−13.3
Turnout		35,033	67.8	+1.3
Registered electors		51,654		
Conservative hold		Swing	−13.5	

General election 1964: Birmingham Edgbaston
Party	Candidate	Votes	%	±%
Conservative	Edith Pitt	22,818	67.4	−2.3
Labour	Alec Kazantzis	11,059	32.6	+2.3
Majority		11,759	34.8	−4.6
Turnout		33,877	66.5	−1.7
Registered electors		50,966		
Conservative hold		Swing	−2.4	

=== Elections in the 1950s ===
General election 1959: Birmingham Edgbaston
Party	Candidate	Votes	%	±%
Conservative	Edith Pitt	26,401	69.7	+2.0
Labour	Nora Hinks	11,473	30.3	−2.0
Majority		14,928	39.4	+4.0
Turnout		37,874	68.2	0.0
Registered electors		55,719		
Conservative hold		Swing	+2.0	

General election 1955: Birmingham Edgbaston
Party	Candidate	Votes	%	±%
Conservative	Edith Pitt	26,991	67.7	+3.4
Labour	Kenneth V Russell	12,897	32.3	−3.4
Majority		14,094	35.4	+6.8
Turnout		39,888	68.2	−7.9
Registered electors		58,469		
Conservative hold		Swing	+3.4	

1953 By-election: Birmingham Edgbaston
Party	Candidate	Votes	%	±%
Conservative	Edith Pitt	20,142	67.6	+3.3
Labour	FB Watson	9,635	32.4	−3.3
Majority		10,507	35.2	+6.6
Turnout		29,777		
Conservative hold		Swing	+3.4	

General election 1951: Birmingham Edgbaston
Party	Candidate	Votes	%	±%
Conservative	Peter Bennett	29,477	64.3	+1.6
Labour	William Pringle	16,373	35.7	−1.6
Majority		13,104	28.6	+3.2
Turnout		45,850	76.1	−2.7
Registered electors		60,278		
Conservative hold		Swing	+1.6	

General election 1950: Birmingham Edgbaston
Party	Candidate	Votes	%	±%
Conservative	Peter Bennett	29,404	62.7	+9.2
Labour	JA Hobson	17,512	37.3	+5.3
Majority		11,892	25.4	+3.9
Turnout		46,916	78.8	+9.6
Registered electors		59,571		
Conservative hold		Swing	+2.0	

=== Elections in the 1940s ===
General election 1945: Birmingham Edgbaston
Party	Candidate	Votes	%	±%
Conservative	Peter Bennett	21,497	53.5	−28.1
Labour	George Corbyn Barrow	12,879	32.0	+13.6
Liberal	Arthur Asher Shenfield	5,832	14.5	New
Majority		8,618	21.5	−41.7
Turnout		40,208	69.2	+6.8
Registered electors		58,199		
Conservative hold		Swing	−20.9	

1940 by-election: Birmingham Edgbaston
Party	Candidate	Votes	%	±%
Conservative	Peter Bennett	Unopposed		
Conservative hold				

=== Elections in the 1930s ===
General election 1935: Birmingham Edgbaston
Party	Candidate	Votes	%	±%
Conservative	Neville Chamberlain	28,243	81.6	−4.9
Labour	J Adshead	6,381	18.4	+4.9
Majority		21,862	63.2	−9.8
Turnout		34,624	62.4	−8.5
Registered electors		55,474		
Conservative hold		Swing	−4.9	

General election 1931: Birmingham Edgbaston
Party	Candidate	Votes	%	±%
Conservative	Neville Chamberlain	33,085	86.5	+22.8
Labour	WW Blaylock	5,157	13.5	−9.9
Majority		27,928	73.0	+32.7
Turnout		38,242	70.9	+0.9
Registered electors		53,955		
Conservative hold		Swing	+16.4	

=== Elections in the 1920s ===
General election 1929: Birmingham Edgbaston
Party	Candidate	Votes	%	±%
Unionist	Neville Chamberlain	23,350	63.7	−12.9
Labour	William Caple	8,590	23.4	0.0
Liberal	Percy Young	4,720	12.9	New
Majority		14,760	40.3	−12.9
Turnout		36,660	70.0	+5.1
Registered electors		52,366		
Unionist hold		Swing	−12.9	

General election 1924: Birmingham Edgbaston
Party	Candidate	Votes	%	±%
Unionist	Francis Lowe	18,822	76.6	+4.4
Labour	FR Sharkey	5,744	23.4	New
Majority		13,078	53.2	+8.8
Turnout		24,566	64.9	+8.2
Unionist hold		Swing		

General election 1923: Birmingham Edgbaston
Party	Candidate	Votes	%	±%
Unionist	Francis Lowe	15,459	72.2	N/A
Liberal	Alfred Bowkett	5,962	27.8	N/A
Majority		9,497	44.4	N/A
Turnout		21,421	56.7	N/A
Registered electors		37,779		
Unionist hold		Swing	N/A	

General election 1922: Birmingham Edgbaston
Party	Candidate	Votes	%	±%
Unionist	Francis Lowe	Unopposed		
Unionist hold				

=== Elections in the 1910s ===
General election 1918: Birmingham Edgbaston
Party		Candidate	Votes	%	±%
C	Unionist	Francis Lowe	13,565	76.4	N/A
	Liberal	John Barnsley	4,184	23.6	N/A
Majority			9,381	52.8	N/A
Turnout			17,749	48.0	N/A
Registered electors			37,013		
	Unionist hold		Swing	N/A	
C indicates candidate endorsed by the coalition government.

General election, December 1910: Birmingham Edgbaston
Party	Candidate	Votes	%	±%
Conservative	Francis Lowe	Unopposed		
Registered electors		13,383		
Conservative hold				

General election, January 1910: Birmingham Edgbaston
Party	Candidate	Votes	%	±%
Conservative	Francis Lowe	7,951	73.6	+3.5
Liberal	J. H. Morgan	2,850	26.4	−3.5
Majority		5,101	47.2	+7.0
Turnout		10,801	80.7	+2.3
Registered electors		13,383		
Conservative hold		Swing	+3.5	

=== Elections in the 1900s ===
General election 1906: Birmingham Edgbaston
Party	Candidate	Votes	%	±%
Conservative	Francis Lowe	7,263	70.1	N/A
Liberal	Lionel Holland	3,103	29.9	N/A
Majority		4,160	40.2	N/A
Turnout		10,366	78.4	N/A
Registered electors		13,230		
Conservative hold		Swing	N/A	

General election 1900: Birmingham Edgbaston
Party	Candidate	Votes	%	±%
Conservative	Francis Lowe	Unopposed		
Conservative hold				

=== Elections in the 1890s ===
By-election, 15 February 1898: Birmingham Edgbaston
Party	Candidate	Votes	%	±%
Conservative	Francis Lowe	Unopposed		
Conservative hold				

General election 1895: Birmingham Edgbaston
Party	Candidate	Votes	%	±%
Liberal Unionist	George Dixon	Unopposed		
Liberal Unionist hold				

General election 1892: Birmingham Edgbaston
Party	Candidate	Votes	%	±%
Liberal Unionist	George Dixon	Unopposed		
Liberal Unionist hold				

=== Elections in the 1880s ===
General election 1886: Birmingham Edgbaston
Party	Candidate	Votes	%	±%
Liberal Unionist	George Dixon	Unopposed		
Liberal Unionist gain from Liberal				

General election 1885: Birmingham Edgbaston
Party	Candidate	Votes	%	±%
Liberal	George Dixon	4,098	58.5	
Conservative	John Eardley-Wilmot	2,907	41.5	
Majority		1,191	17.0	
Turnout		7,005	80.6	
Registered electors		8,693		
Liberal win (new seat)				

== See also ==
- List of parliamentary constituencies in the West Midlands (county)
- List of parliamentary constituencies in West Midlands (region)

== Sources ==
- British Parliamentary Election Results 1885–1918, compiled and edited by F.W.S. Craig (Macmillan Press 1974)
- Debrett’s Illustrated Heraldic and Biographical House of Commons and the Judicial Bench 1886
- Debrett’s House of Commons and the Judicial Bench 1901
- Debrett’s House of Commons and the Judicial Bench 1918

Parliament of the United Kingdom
Preceded by Colne Valley	Constituency represented by the chancellor of the Exchequer; 1931–1937	Succeeded by Spen Valley
Preceded by Bewdley	Constituency represented by the prime minister 1937–1940	Succeeded by Epping
