= List of female members of the House of Lords =

This is a list of women who have been sat as members of the House of Lords of the United Kingdom. Unless stated otherwise, the reason for leaving the Lords is death.

== List of members ==
Party	Name	Start	End	Reason	Type
Labour	Barbara Wootton, Baroness Wootton of Abinger	8 August 1958	11 July 1988		Life
Crossbench	Stella Isaacs, Baroness Swanborough	22 September 1958	22 May 1971		Life
Unionist	Katharine Elliot, Baroness Elliot of Harwood	26 September 1958	April 1965	Scottish Unionists merged into Conservatives	Life
Conservative	Katharine Elliot, Baroness Elliot of Harwood	April 1965	3 January 1994		Life
Crossbench	Irene Curzon, Baroness Ravensdale of Kedleston	6 October 1958	9 February 1966		Life (Note: Inherited title earlier but had been elevated as a life peer from 1958 prior to becoming eligible to sit in the Lords as a hereditary peer after the Peerage Act 1963.)
Conservative	Florence Horsbrugh, Baroness Horsbrugh (Note: Also served as a Member of Parliament (MP).)	16 December 1959	6 December 1969		Life
Labour	Edith Summerskill, Baroness Summerskill	4 February 1961	4 February 1980		Life
Labour	Elaine Burton, Baroness Burton of Coventry	13 April 1962	26 March 1981	Resigned from the Labour Party, joined the SDP	Life
SDP	Elaine Burton, Baroness Burton of Coventry	26 March 1981	3 March 1988	SDP merged into Liberal Democrats, joined continuing SDP	Life
SDP	Elaine Burton, Baroness Burton of Coventry	3 March 1988	3 June 1990	Continuing SDP dissolved	Life
Non-affiliated	Elaine Burton, Baroness Burton of Coventry	3 June 1990	6 October 1991		Life
Conservative	Elizabeth Philipps, 14th Baroness Strange	19 November 1963 (Note: Inherited title earlier and became eligible to sit in the Lords as a hereditary peer after the Peerage Act 1963.)	12 December 1974		Hereditary
Conservative	Rosina MacNamee, 24th Baroness Audley	20 November 1963	24 October 1974		Hereditary
Conservative	Mona Fitzalan-Howard, 11th Baroness Beaumont	4 December 1963	31 August 1971		Hereditary
Conservative	Frances Davidson, Baroness Northchurch	13 January 1964	25 November 1985		Life
Labour	Dora Gaitskell, Baroness Gaitskell	23 January 1964	1 July 1989		Life
Crossbench	Mary Freeman-Grenville, 12th Lady Kinloss	18 February 1964	11 November 1999	Removed by the House of Lords Act 1999	Hereditary
Conservative	Katherine Bigham, 12th Lady Nairne	27 October 1964	20 September 1995		Hereditary
Conservative	Diana Hay, 23rd Countess of Erroll	29 July 1964	16 May 1978		Hereditary
Conservative	Barbara Brooke, Baroness Brooke of Ystradfellte	8 December 1964	1 September 2000		Life
Liberal	Violet Bonham Carter, Baroness Asquith of Yarnbury	21 December 1964	19 February 1969		Life
Labour	Norah Phillips, Baroness Phillips	21 December 1964	14 August 1992		Life
Conservative	Evelyn Emmet, Baroness Emmet of Amberley	3 February 1965	10 October 1980		Life
Labour	Beatrice Plummer, Baroness Plummer	10 May 1965	13 June 1972		Life
Crossbench	Clementine Churchill, Baroness Spencer-Churchill	17 May 1965	12 December 1977		Life
Crossbench	Audrey Hylton-Foster, Baroness Hylton-Foster	7 December 1965	31 October 2002		Life
Crossbench	Ann Forbes-Sempill, 20th Lady Sempill	30 December 1965	19 July 1966	Joined the Conservatives	Hereditary
Conservative	Ann Forbes-Sempill, 20th Lady Sempill	19 July 1966	6 July 1995		Hereditary
Labour	Mary Stocks, Baroness Stocks	17 January 1966	6 July 1975		Life
Labour	Evelyn Sharp, Baroness Sharp	19 September 1966	26 March 1981	Resigned from the Labour Party, joined the SDP	Life
SDP	Evelyn Sharp, Baroness Sharp	26 March 1981	3 March 1988		Life
Labour	Beatrice Serota, Baroness Serota	20 January 1967	21 October 2002		Life
Crossbench	Mary Foley-Berkeley, 17th Baroness Berkeley	5 April 1967	17 October 1992		Hereditary
Crossbench	Barbara Abney-Hastings, 13th Countess of Loudoun	22 June 1967	1 November 2002		Hereditary
Labour	Annie Llewelyn-Davies, Baroness Llewelyn-Davies of Hastoe	29 August 1967	6 November 1997		Life
Labour	Alma Birk, Baroness Birk	15 September 1967	29 December 1996		Life
Conservative	Bridget Monckton, 11th Lady Ruthven of Freeland	26 October 1967	17 April 1982		Hereditary
Crossbench	Elizabeth Sutherland, 24th Countess of Sutherland	27 March 1968	11 November 1999	Removed by the House of Lords Act 1999	Hereditary
Crossbench	Davina Ingrams, 18th Baroness Darcy de Knayth	15 July 1969	24 February 2008		Hereditary
Crossbench	Susan Cunliffe-Lister, Baroness Masham of Ilton	25 February 1970	12 March 2023		Life
Crossbench	Rachel Douglas-Home, 27th Baroness Dacre	28 May 1970	11 November 1999	Removed by the House of Lords Act 1999	Hereditary
Conservative	Priscilla Buchan, Baroness Tweedsmuir of Belhelvie	1 July 1970	11 March 1978		Life
Labour	Eirene White, Baroness White	12 October 1970	23 December 1999		Life
Labour	Alice Bacon, Baroness Bacon	14 October 1970	24 March 1993		Life
Labour	Jennie Lee, Baroness Lee of Asheridge	5 November 1970	16 November 1988		Life
Liberal	Nancy Seear, Baroness Seear	18 May 1971	3 March 1988	Liberals merged into Liberal Democrats	Life
Liberal Democrats	Nancy Seear, Baroness Seear	3 March 1988	23 April 1997		Life
Conservative	Janet Young, Baroness Young	24 May 1971	6 September 2002		Life
Conservative	Evelyn Macleod, Baroness Macleod of Borve	8 June 1971	17 November 1999		Life
Crossbench	Rosemary Portal, 2nd Baroness Portal of Hungerford	26 April 1972	29 September 1990		Hereditary
Conservative	Diana Elles, Baroness Elles (Note: Also served as a Member of the European Parliament (MEP).)	2 May 1972	17 October 2009		Life
Conservative	Barbara Hamilton, 14th Baroness Dudley	23 May 1973	11 November 1999	Removed by the House of Lords Act 1999	Hereditary
Conservative	Pamela Sharples, Baroness Sharples	18 June 1973	18 December 2017	Retired	Life
Conservative	Patricia Hornsby-Smith, Baroness Hornsby-Smith	13 May 1974	3 July 1985		Life
Liberal	Inga-Stina Robson, Baroness Robson of Kiddington	14 May 1974	3 March 1988	Liberals merged into Liberal Democrats	Life
Liberal Democrats	Inga-Stina Robson, Baroness Robson of Kiddington	3 March 1988	9 February 1999		Life
Conservative	Mervyn Pike, Baroness Pike	15 May 1974	11 January 2004		Life
Labour	Phyllis Stedman, Baroness Stedman	25 June 1974	26 March 1981	Resigned from the Labour Party, joined the SDP	Life
SDP	Phyllis Stedman, Baroness Stedman	26 March 1981	3 March 1988	SDP merged into Liberal Democrats, joined continuing SDP	Life
SDP	Phyllis Stedman, Baroness Stedman	3 March 1988	3 June 1990	Continuing SDP dissolved	Life
Non-affiliated	Phyllis Stedman, Baroness Stedman	3 June 1990	8 June 1996		Life
Labour	Doris Fisher, Baroness Fisher of Rednal	2 July 1974	18 December 2005		Life
Labour	Margaret Delacourt-Smith, Baroness Delacourt-Smith of Alteryn	5 July 1974	8 June 2010		Life
Labour	Marcia Williams, Baroness Falkender	11 July 1974	6 February 2019		Life
Conservative	Irene Ward, Baroness Ward of North Tyneside	23 January 1975	26 April 1980		Life
Conservative	Joan Vickers, Baroness Vickers	27 January 1975	23 May 1994		Life
Labour	Mary Stewart, Baroness Stewart of Alvechurch	28 January 1975	28 December 1984		Life
Crossbench	Anne Cowdrey, 14th Lady Herries of Terregles	31 January 1975 (Note: Never took seat.)	11 November 1999	Removed by the House of Lords Act 1999	Hereditary
Crossbench	Rosamund Greaves, 11th Countess of Dysart	2 June 1975	11 November 1999	Removed by the House of Lords Act 1999	Hereditary
Conservative	Anne Palmer, 11th Baroness Lucas	10 June 1975	12 October 1991		Hereditary
Crossbench	Margaret of Mar, 31st Countess of Mar	28 October 1975	1 May 2020	Retired	Hereditary
Conservative	Lucy Faithfull, Baroness Faithfull	26 January 1976	13 March 1996		Life
Labour	Barbara Ward, Baroness Jackson of Lodsworth	18 October 1976	31 May 1981		Life
Labour	Betty Lockwood, Baroness Lockwood	27 February 1978	18 May 2017	Retired	Life
Labour	Nora David, Baroness David	28 April 1978	29 November 2009		Life
Labour	Evelyn Denington, Baroness Denington	10 July 1978	22 August 1998		Life
Crossbench	Sue Ryder, Baroness Ryder of Warsaw	31 January 1979	2 November 2000		Life
Labour	Lena Jeger, Baroness Jeger	11 July 1979	26 February 2007		Life
Crossbench	Jean McFarlane, Baroness McFarlane of Llandaff	30 July 1979	13 May 2012		Life
Conservative	Diana Neave, Baroness Airey of Abingdon	6 August 1979	27 November 1992		Life
Conservative	Betty Harvie Anderson, Baroness Skrimshire of Quarter	4 October 1979	7 November 1979		Life
Crossbench	Flora Fraser, 21st Lady Saltoun	13 December 1979	12 December 2014	Retired	Hereditary
Conservative	Jean Barker, Baroness Trumpington	4 February 1980	24 October 2017	Retired	Life
Conservative	Felicity Lane-Fox, Baroness Lane-Fox	19 May 1981	17 April 1988		Life
Labour	Jane Ewart-Biggs, Baroness Ewart-Biggs	22 May 1981	8 October 1992		Life
Conservative	Beryl Platt, Baroness Platt of Writtle	28 May 1981	1 February 2015		Life
Conservative	Trixie Gardner, Baroness Gardner of Parkes	23 June 1981	14 April 2024		Life
Conservative	Elizabeth Carnegy, Baroness Carnegy of Lour	14 July 1982	9 November 2010		Life
Labour Co-op	Wendy Nicol, Baroness Nicol	20 January 1983	15 January 2018		Life
Conservative	Caroline Cox, Baroness Cox	24 January 1983	May 2004	Expelled from the Conservative Party, became a Crossbencher	Life
Crossbench	Caroline Cox, Baroness Cox	May 2004	present	Serving	Life
Crossbench	Mary Warnock, Baroness Warnock	6 February 1985	1 June 2015	Retired	Life
Labour	Muriel Turner, Baroness Turner of Camden	29 May 1985	13 June 2017	Retired	Life
Conservative	Mary Aubrey-Fletcher, 8th Baroness Braye	9 April 1986	11 November 1999	Removed by the House of Lords Act 1999	Hereditary
Conservative	Gloria Hooper, Baroness Hooper	10 June 1985	present	Serving	Life
Conservative	Cherry Drummond, 16th Baroness Strange	17 December 1986	December 1998	Resigned the Conservative Party whip, elected as an excepted crossbencher in 1999	Hereditary
Crossbench	Cherry Drummond, 16th Baroness Strange	December 1998	11 March 2005		Hereditary
Labour	Tessa Blackstone, Baroness Blackstone	18 March 1987	1 January 2018	Resigned from the Labour Party, changed affiliation to Independent Labour	Life
Independent Labour	Tessa Blackstone, Baroness Blackstone	1 January 2018	1 August 2022	Rejoined party	Life
Labour	Tessa Blackstone, Baroness Blackstone	1 August 2022	present	Serving	Life
Conservative	Emily Blatch, Baroness Blatch	4 July 1987	31 May 2005		Life
Crossbench	Patricia Knatchbull, 2nd Countess Mountbatten of Burma	8 July 1987	11 November 1999	Removed by the House of Lords Act 1999	Hereditary
Labour	Judith Hart, Baroness Hart of South Lanark	8 February 1988	8 December 1991		Life
Conservative	Sarah Oppenheim-Barnes, Baroness Oppenheim-Barnes	9 February 1989	25 February 2019	Retired	Life
Conservative	Daphne Park, Baroness Park of Monmouth	27 February 1990	24 March 2010		Life
Conservative	Diana Eccles, Baroness Eccles of Moulton	10 May 1990	30 April 2026	Resigned	Life
Conservative	Julia Cumberlege, Baroness Cumberlege	18 May 1990	20 December 2024	Retired	Life
Conservative	Heather Brigstocke, Baroness Brigstocke	21 May 1990	30 April 2004		Life
Labour	Patricia Hollis, Baroness Hollis of Heigham	1 June 1990	13 October 2018		Life
Conservative	Shreela Flather, Baroness Flather	11 June 1990	3 December 1998	Resigned from the Conservative whip	Life
Crossbench	Shreela Flather, Baroness Flather	3 December 1998	31 July 1999	Rejoined the Conservatives	Life
Conservative	Shreela Flather, Baroness Flather	31 July 1999	12 May 2008	Resigned from the Conservative Party, became a Crossbencher	Life
Crossbench	Shreela Flather, Baroness Flather	12 May 2008	6 February 2024		Life
Crossbench	Ziki Robertson, 11th Baroness Wharton	25 June 1990	15 May 2000		Hereditary
Crossbench	Lydia Dunn, Baroness Dunn	24 August 1990	29 June 2010	Permanently disqualified under the provisions of the Constitutional Reform and Governance Act 2010	Life
Labour	Barbara Castle, Baroness Castle of Blackburn	16 July 1990	3 May 2002		Life
Conservative	P. D. James, Baroness James of Holland Park	7 February 1991	27 November 2014		Life
Conservative	Joan Seccombe, Baroness Seccombe	14 February 1991	present	Serving	Life
Liberal Democrats	Sally Hamwee, Baroness Hamwee (Note: Also served as a Member of the London Assembly (AM).)	6 June 1991	present	Serving	Life
Conservative	Jean Denton, Baroness Denton of Wakefield	11 June 1991	5 February 2001		Life
Labour	Jennifer Hilton, Baroness Hilton of Eggardon	14 June 1991	5 November 2021	Retired	Life
Labour	Ann Mallalieu, Baroness Mallalieu	19 June 1991	present	Serving	Life
Conservative	Detta O'Cathain, Baroness O'Cathain	21 June 1991	23 April 2021		Life
Conservative	Pauline Perry, Baroness Perry of Southwark	16 July 1991	26 May 2016	Retired	Life
Conservative	Lynda Chalker, Baroness Chalker of Wallasey	24 April 1992	3 February 2023	Retired	Life
Conservative	Margaret Thatcher, Baroness Thatcher (Note: Also served as Prime Minister.)	28 April 1992	8 April 2013		Life
Labour	Margaret Jay, Baroness Jay of Paddington	29 July 1992	present	Serving	Life
Liberal Democrats	Shirley Williams, Baroness Williams of Crosby	1 February 1993	11 February 2016	Retired	Life
Labour	Joyce Gould, Baroness Gould of Potternewton	6 October 1993	22 July 2019		Life
Labour	Brenda Dean, Baroness Dean of Thornton-le-Fylde	12 October 1993	13 March 2018		Life
Conservative	Doreen Miller, Baroness Miller of Hendon	14 October 1993	21 June 2014		Life
Crossbench	Jane Heathcote-Drummond-Willoughby, 28th Baroness Willoughby de Eresby	25 January 1994	11 November 1999	Removed by the House of Lords Act 1999	Hereditary
Labour	Josie Farrington, Baroness Farrington of Ribbleton	29 September 1994	30 March 2018		Life
Conservative	Patricia Rawlings, Baroness Rawlings	5 October 1994	present	Serving	Life
Liberal Democrats	Susan Thomas, Baroness Thomas of Walliswood	6 October 1994	18 May 2016	Removed for non-attendance	Life
Conservative	Sarah Hogg, Baroness Hogg	3 February 1995	29 May 2010	Resigned from the Conservative Party, became a Crossbencher	Life
Crossbench	Sarah Hogg, Baroness Hogg	29 May 2010	present	Serving	Life
Labour	Elizabeth Smith, Baroness Smith of Gilmorehill	17 February 1995	28 February 2025	Resigned	Life
Conservative	Pamela Kirkham, 16th Baroness Berners	25 October 1995	11 November 1999	Removed by the House of Lords Act 1999	Hereditary
Labour	Helene Hayman, Baroness Hayman	2 January 1996	4 July 2006	Resigned from the Labour Party, became a Crossbencher	Life
Crossbench	Helene Hayman, Baroness Hayman	4 July 2006	present	Serving	Life
Conservative	Judith Wilcox, Baroness Wilcox	16 January 1996	17 December 2020	Retired	Life
Crossbench	June Lloyd, Baroness Lloyd of Highbury	12 July 1996	28 June 2006		Life
Labour	Elizabeth Symons, Baroness Symons of Vernham Dean	7 October 1996	present	Serving	Life
Labour	Meta Ramsay, Baroness Ramsay of Cartvale	11 October 1996	28 May 2026		Life
Conservative	Joyce Anelay, Baroness Anelay of St Johns	14 October 1996	present	Serving	Life
Conservative	Hazel Byford, Baroness Byford	15 October 1996	5 May 2020	Retired	Life
Crossbench	Audrey Emerton, Baroness Emerton	17 February 1997	1 November 2019		Life
Labour	Joan Lestor, Baroness Lestor of Eccles	4 June 1997	27 March 1998		Life
Conservative	Jill Knight, Baroness Knight of Collingtree	23 September 1997	24 March 2016	Retired	Life
Conservative	Janet Fookes, Baroness Fookes	30 September 1997	present	Serving	Life
Liberal Democrats	Sarah Ludford, Baroness Ludford	30 September 1997	present	Serving	Life
Labour	Jill Pitkeathley, Baroness Pitkeathley	6 October 1997	present	Serving	Life
Labour	Valerie Amos, Baroness Amos	23 October 1997	present	Serving	Life
Labour	Ruth Rendell, Baroness Rendell of Babergh	24 October 1997	2 May 2015		Life
Labour	Helena Kennedy, Baroness Kennedy of The Shaws	27 October 1997	present	Serving	Life
Liberal Democrats	Diana Maddock, Baroness Maddock	30 October 1997	26 June 2020		Life
Liberal Democrats	Veronica Linklater, Baroness Linklater of Butterstone	1 November 1997	12 February 2016	Retired	Life
Liberal Democrats	Emma Nicholson, Baroness Nicholson of Winterbourne	3 November 1997	July 2016	Resigned from the Liberal Democrats	Life
Non-affiliated	Emma Nicholson, Baroness Nicholson of Winterbourne	July 2016	12 September 2016	Joined Conservatives	Life
Conservative	Emma Nicholson, Baroness Nicholson of Winterbourne	12 September 2016	present	Serving	Life
Labour	Barbara Young, Baroness Young of Old Scone	4 November 1997	present	Serving	Life
Labour	Patricia Scotland, Baroness Scotland of Asthal	6 November 1997	present	Serving	Life
Labour	Mary Goudie, Baroness Goudie	21 July 1998	16 December 2022	Removed from the Labour Party whip	Life
Non-affiliated	Mary Goudie, Baroness Goudie	16 December 2022	11 January 2023	Suspended from the Lords until the Labour whip was restored.	Life
Labour	Mary Goudie, Baroness Goudie	11 July 2023	present	Serving	Life
Labour	Pola Uddin, Baroness Uddin	21 July 1998	21 October 2010	Expelled from the Labour Party, became a Crossbencher	Life
Crossbench	Pola Uddin, Baroness Uddin	21 October 2010	present	Serving	Life
Conservative	Peta Buscombe, Baroness Buscombe	23 July 1998	present	Serving	Life
Labour Co-op	Glenys Thornton, Baroness Thornton	23 July 1998	present	Serving	Life
Labour	Christine Crawley, Baroness Crawley	24 July 1998	present	Serving	Life
Liberal Democrats	Susan Miller, Baroness Miller of Chilthorne Domer	28 July 1998	present	Serving	Life
Liberal Democrats	Margaret Sharp, Baroness Sharp of Guildford	1 August 1998	31 July 2016	Retired	Life
Crossbench	Kathleen Richardson, Baroness Richardson of Calow	3 August 1998	20 December 2018	Retired	Life
Crossbench	Onora O'Neill, Baroness O'Neill of Bengarve	25 February 1999	present	Serving	Life
Crossbench	Jennifer Forwood, 11th Baroness Arlington	27 May 1999	11 November 1999	Removed by the House of Lords Act 1999	Hereditary
Labour	Diana Warwick, Baroness Warwick of Undercliffe	10 July 1999	present	Serving	Life
Crossbench	Vivien Stern, Baroness Stern	13 July 1999	2 December 2025	Resigned	Life
Crossbench	Usha Prashar, Baroness Prashar	15 July 1999	present	Serving	Life
Labour	Rosalind Howells, Baroness Howells of St Davids	21 July 1999	10 January 2019	Retired	Life
Labour	Doreen Massey, Baroness Massey of Darwen	26 July 1999	20 April 2024		Life
Conservative	Joan Hanham, Baroness Hanham	27 July 1999	22 July 2020	Retired	Life
Labour	Rosalie Wilkins, Baroness Wilkins	30 July 1999	23 July 2015	Retired	Life
Liberal Democrats	Elizabeth Barker, Baroness Barker	31 July 1999	present	Serving	Life
Labour	May Blood, Baroness Blood	31 July 1999	4 September 2018	Retired	Life
Labour	Genista McIntosh, Baroness McIntosh of Hudnall	3 August 1999	present	Serving	Life
Labour	Anita Gale, Baroness Gale	4 August 1999	present	Serving	Life
Labour	Janet Whitaker, Baroness Whitaker	5 August 1999	present	Serving	Life
Liberal Democrats	Angela Harris, Baroness Harris of Richmond	6 August 1999	present	Serving	Life
Labour	Catherine Ashton, Baroness Ashton of Upholland	20 October 1999	4 October 2008	Changed affiliation to non-affiliated	Life
Non-affiliated	Catherine Ashton, Baroness Ashton of Upholland	4 October 2008	present	Serving	Life
Crossbench	Sally Greengross, Baroness Greengross	15 February 2000	23 June 2022		Life
Labour	Angela Billingham, Baroness Billingham	2 May 2000	13 May 2026	Removed for non-attendance	Life
Labour	Janet Cohen, Baroness Cohen of Pimlico	3 May 2000	19 December 2024	Retired	Life
Labour	Kay Andrews, Baroness Andrews	9 May 2000	present	Serving	Life
Labour	Anne Gibson, Baroness Gibson of Market Rasen	9 May 2000	20 April 2018		Life
Liberal Democrats	Lindsay Northover, Baroness Northover	10 May 2000	present	Serving	Life
Liberal Democrats	Rosalind Scott, Baroness Scott of Needham Market	15 May 2000	present	Serving	Life
Liberal Democrats	Joan Walmsley, Baroness Walmsley	15 May 2000	present	Serving	Life
Conservative	Sheila Noakes, Baroness Noakes	7 June 2000	present	Serving	Life
Crossbench	Betty Boothroyd, Baroness Boothroyd (Note: Also served as Speaker of the House of Commons.)	15 January 2001	26 February 2023		Life
Crossbench	Susan Greenfield, Baroness Greenfield	18 June 2001	present	Serving	Life
Labour	Sally Morgan, Baroness Morgan of Huyton	20 June 2001	present	Serving	Life
Crossbench	Valerie Howarth, Baroness Howarth of Breckland	25 June 2001	23 March 2025		Life
Crossbench	Ilora Finlay, Baroness Finlay of Llandaff	28 June 2001	present	Serving	Life
Crossbench	Elspeth Howe, Baroness Howe of Idlicote	29 June 2001	2 June 2020	Retired	Life
Labour	Llin Golding, Baroness Golding	13 July 2001	present	Serving	Life
Liberal Democrats	Ray Michie, Baroness Michie of Gallanach	14 July 2001	6 May 2008		Life
Crossbench	Brenda Hale, Baroness Hale of Richmond	12 January 2004	31 August 2009	Constitutional Reform Act 2005 provisions repealing Lords of Appeal in Ordinary came into effect.	Law
Crossbench	Brenda Hale, Baroness Hale of Richmond	31 August 2009	present	Serving	Life
Labour	Ruth Henig, Baroness Henig	8 June 2004	29 February 2024		Life
Labour	Margaret Wall, Baroness Wall of New Barnet	10 June 2004	25 January 2017		Life
Labour	Delyth Morgan, Baroness Morgan of Drefelin	11 June 2004	1 July 2011	Resigned from the Labour to serve as a nonprofit executive	Life
Crossbench	Delyth Morgan, Baroness Morgan of Drefelin	1 July 2011	1 July 2024	Retook Labour whip	Life
Crossbench	Delyth Morgan, Baroness Morgan of Drefelin	1 July 2024	present	Serving	Life
Labour	Margaret Prosser, Baroness Prosser	11 June 2004	present	Serving	Life
Crossbench	Nicky Chapman, Baroness Chapman	14 June 2004	3 September 2009		Life
Liberal Democrats	Kishwer Falkner, Baroness Falkner of Margravine	15 June 2004	24 July 2019	Resigned from the Liberal Democrats, became a Crossbencher	Life
Non-affiliated	Kishwer Falkner, Baroness Falkner of Margravine	24 July 2019	3 September 2020	Joined Crossbenchers	Life
Crossbench	Kishwer Falkner, Baroness Falkner of Margravine	24 July 2019	present	Serving	Life
Liberal Democrats	Julia Neuberger, Baroness Neuberger	15 June 2004	6 September 2011	Resigned from the Liberal Democrats to serve as a senior rabbi	Life
Crossbench	Julia Neuberger, Baroness Neuberger	6 September 2011	present	Serving	Life
Crossbench	Elaine Murphy, Baroness Murphy	17 June 2004	1 March 2025	Took a leave of absence	Life
Conservative	Patricia Morris, Baroness Morris of Bolton	22 June 2004	present	Serving	Life
Crossbench	Lola Young, Baroness Young of Hornsey	22 June 2004	present	Serving	Life
Labour	Margaret McDonagh, Baroness McDonagh	24 June 2004	24 June 2023		Life
Labour Co-op	Janet Royall, Baroness Royall of Blaisdon	25 June 2004	present	Serving	Life
Liberal Democrats	Jane Bonham Carter, Baroness Bonham-Carter of Yarnbury	21 July 2004	present	Serving	Life
Crossbench	Frances D'Souza, Baroness D'Souza	15 September 2004	present	Serving	Life
Crossbench	Rennie Fritchie, Baroness Fritchie	31 May 2005	1 July 2024	Retired	Life
Labour	Estelle Morris, Baroness Morris of Yardley	14 June 2005	present	Serving	Life
Labour	Ann Taylor, Baroness Taylor of Bolton	14 June 2005	present	Serving	Life
Labour	Lynda Clark, Baroness Clark of Calton	21 June 2005	present	Serving	Life
Conservative	Gillian Shephard, Baroness Shephard of Northwold	21 June 2005	present	Serving	Life
Conservative	Virginia Bottomley, Baroness Bottomley of Nettlestone	24 June 2005	present	Serving	Life
Liberal Democrats	Jenny Tonge, Baroness Tonge	27 June 2005	1 March 2012	Suspended from the Liberal Democrats	Life
Ind. Liberal Democrat	Jenny Tonge, Baroness Tonge	1 March 2012	30 October 2016	Resigned from the Liberal Democrats	Life
Non-affiliated	Jenny Tonge, Baroness Tonge	30 October 2016	19 February 2021	Retired	Life
Labour	Irene Adams, Baroness Adams of Craigielea	28 June 2005	present	Serving	Life
Labour	Jean Corston, Baroness Corston	29 June 2005	9 July 2024	Removed for non-attendance	Life
Crossbench	Ruth Deech, Baroness Deech	5 October 2005	present	Serving	Life
Crossbench	Jo Valentine, Baroness Valentine	10 October 2005	present	Serving	Life
Crossbench	Molly Meacher, Baroness Meacher	2 May 2006	28 October 2025	Resigned	Life
Liberal Democrats	Celia Thomas, Baroness Thomas of Winchester	26 May 2006	present	Serving	Life
Labour	Joyce Quin, Baroness Quin	30 May 2006	19 December 2024	Retired	Life
Labour	Denise Kingsmill, Baroness Kingsmill	1 June 2006	present	Serving	Life
Labour	Maggie Jones, Baroness Jones of Whitchurch	5 June 2006	present	Serving	Life
Crossbench	Elizabeth Butler-Sloss, Baroness Butler-Sloss	13 June 2006	present	Serving	Life
DUP	Eileen Paisley, Baroness Paisley of St George's (Note: Also served as a Member of the Legislative Assembly (MLA).)	14 June 2006	30 October 2017	Retired	Life
Conservative	Sandip Verma, Baroness Verma	22 June 2006	present	Serving	Life
Crossbench	Jean Coussins, Baroness Coussins	23 March 2007	present	Serving	Life
Crossbench	Jane Campbell, Baroness Campbell of Surbiton	30 March 2007	present	Serving	Life
Conservative	Sayeeda Warsi, Baroness Warsi	2 July 2007	26 September 2024	Resigned the Conservative whip, became non-affiliated	Life
Non-affiliated	Sayeeda Warsi, Baroness Warsi	26 September 2024	present	Serving	Life
Labour	Shriti Vadera, Baroness Vadera	11 July 2007	8 December 2011	Took a leave of absence	Life
Non-affiliated	Shriti Vadera, Baroness Vadera	16 May 2022	present	Serving	Life
Labour	Margaret Ford, Baroness Ford	12 July 2007	23 January 2013	Resigned Labour whip	Life
Non-affiliated	Margaret Ford, Baroness Ford	23 January 2013	18 December 2025	Resigned	Life
Conservative	Pauline Neville-Jones, Baroness Neville-Jones	15 October 2007	present	Serving	Life
Liberal Democrats	Susan Garden, Baroness Garden of Frognal	18 October 2007	present	Serving	Life
Crossbench	Haleh Afshar, Baroness Afshar	13 December 2007	22 May 2022		Life
Crossbench	Elizabeth Manningham-Buller, Baroness Manningham-Buller	2 June 2008	present	Serving	Life
Crossbench	Sue Campbell, Baroness Campbell of Loughborough	10 November 2008	present	Serving	Life
Labour	Glenys Kinnock, Baroness Kinnock of Holyhead	30 June 2009	9 April 2021	Retired	Life
Crossbench	Nuala O'Loan, Baroness O'Loan	11 September 2009	present	Serving	Life
Crossbench	Tanni Grey-Thompson, Baroness Grey-Thompson	23 March 2010	present	Serving	Life
Labour	Hilary Armstrong, Baroness Armstrong of Hill Top	18 June 2010	present	Serving	Life
Labour	Jeannie Drake, Baroness Drake	20 June 2010	present	Serving	Life
Labour Co-op	Dianne Hayter, Baroness Hayter of Kentish Town	22 June 2010	present	Serving	Life
Liberal Democrats	Meral Hussein-Ece, Baroness Hussein-Ece	25 June 2010	present	Serving	Life
Conservative	Shireen Ritchie, Baroness Ritchie of Brompton	25 June 2010	24 April 2012		Life
Liberal Democrats	Floella Benjamin, Baroness Benjamin	26 June 2010	present	Serving	Life
Labour	Rita Donaghy, Baroness Donaghy	26 June 2010	present	Serving	Life
Labour	Margaret Wheeler, Baroness Wheeler	27 June 2010	present	Serving	Life
Labour	Maeve Sherlock, Baroness Sherlock	5 July 2010	present	Serving	Life
Labour	Helen Liddell, Baroness Liddell of Coatdyke	7 July 2010	present	Serving	Life
Labour	Angela Smith, Baroness Smith of Basildon	7 July 2010	present	Serving	Life
Conservative	Angela Browning, Baroness Browning	9 July 2010	present	Serving	Life
Conservative	Deborah Stedman-Scott, Baroness Stedman-Scott	12 July 2010	present	Serving	Life
Conservative	Helen Newlove, Baroness Newlove	14 July 2010	11 November 2025		Life
Labour	Beverley Hughes, Baroness Hughes of Stretford	15 July 2010	present	Serving	Life
Liberal Democrats	Kate Parminter, Baroness Parminter	15 July 2010	present	Serving	Life
Labour	Anna Healy, Baroness Healy of Primrose Hill	19 July 2010	present	Serving	Life
Labour	Susan Nye, Baroness Nye	19 July 2010	present	Serving	Life
Conservative	Margaret Eaton, Baroness Eaton	21 July 2010	present	Serving	Life
Crossbench	Sheila Hollins, Baroness Hollins	15 November 2010	present	Serving	Life
Liberal Democrats	Dee Doocey, Baroness Doocey	21 December 2010	present	Serving	Life
Conservative	Fiona Shackleton, Baroness Shackleton of Belgravia	21 December 2010	present	Serving	Life
Liberal Democrats	Susan Kramer, Baroness Kramer	22 December 2010	present	Serving	Life
Conservative	Patience Wheatcroft, Baroness Wheatcroft	22 December 2010	present	Serving	Life
Liberal Democrats	Judith Jolly, Baroness Jolly	11 January 2011	31 July 2024	Retired	Life
Conservative	Tina Stowell, Baroness Stowell of Beeston	12 January 2011	present	Serving	Life
Conservative	Elizabeth Berridge, Baroness Berridge	18 January 2011	present	Serving	Life
Labour	Joan Bakewell, Baroness Bakewell	21 January 2011	present	Serving	Life
Conservative	Rachael Heyhoe Flint, Baroness Heyhoe Flint	21 January 2011	18 January 2017		Life
Labour	Eluned Morgan, Baroness Morgan of Ely (Note: Also served as a Member of the Senedd (MS) or Assembly Member (AM).) (Note: Also served as First Minister of Wales.)	24 January 2011	12 May 2021	Took a leave of absence to serve as an MS	Life
Labour	Eluned Morgan, Baroness Morgan of Ely	May 2026	present	Serving	Life
Conservative	Anne Jenkin, Baroness Jenkin of Kennington	26 January 2011	present	Serving	Life
Labour	Oona King, Baroness King of Bow	26 January 2011	9 July 2024	Retired	Life
Liberal Democrats	Jenny Randerson, Baroness Randerson	27 January 2011	4 January 2025		Life
Labour	Bryony Worthington, Baroness Worthington	31 January 2011	17 April 2023	Took a leave of absence	Life
Labour	Ruth Lister, Baroness Lister of Burtersett	1 February 2011	present	Serving	Life
Liberal Democrats	Claire Tyler, Baroness Tyler of Enfield	1 February 2011	present	Serving	Life
Liberal Democrats	Sal Brinton, Baroness Brinton	10 February 2011	present	Serving	Life
Crossbench	Beeban Kidron, Baroness Kidron	26 June 2012	present	Serving	Life
Conservative	Lucy Neville-Rolfe, Baroness Neville-Rolfe	4 February 2013	present	Serving	Life
Crossbench	Martha Lane Fox, Baroness Lane-Fox of Sohoy	26 March 2013	present	Serving	Life
Liberal Democrats	Olly Grender, Baroness Grender	4 September 2013	present	Serving	Life
Conservative	Fiona Hodgson, Baroness Hodgson of Abinger	16 September 2013	present	Serving	Life
Liberal Democrats	Alison Suttie, Baroness Suttie	17 September 2013	present	Serving	Life
Liberal Democrats	Christine Humphreys, Baroness Humphreys	18 September 2013	present	Serving	Life
Labour	Alicia Kennedy, Baroness Kennedy of Cradley	19 September 2013	present	Serving	Life
Conservative	Annabel Goldie, Baroness Goldie (Note: Also served as a Member of the Scottish Parliament (MSP).)	3 October 2013	present	Serving	Life
Liberal Democrats	Zahida Manzoor, Baroness Manzoor	10 October 2013	21 July 2016	Resigned from the Liberal Democrats, became a Conservative	Life
Non-affiliated	Zahida Manzoor, Baroness Manzoor	21 July 2016	10 October 2016	Joined Conservatives	Life
Conservative	Zahida Manzoor, Baroness Manzoor	10 October 2016	present	Serving	Life
Liberal Democrats	Cathy Bakewell, Baroness Bakewell of Hardington Mandeville	15 October 2013	present	Serving	Life
Labour	Doreen Lawrence, Baroness Lawrence of Clarendon	15 October 2013	present	Serving	Life
Green	Jenny Jones, Baroness Jones of Moulsecoomb	5 November 2013	present	Serving	Life
Conservative	Susan Williams, Baroness Williams of Trafford	5 November 2013	present	Serving	Life
Conservative	Natalie Evans, Baroness Evans of Bowes Park	12 September 2014	present	Serving	Life
Liberal Democrats	Julie Smith, Baroness Smith of Newnham	12 September 2014	present	Serving	Life
Conservative	Dido Harding, Baroness Harding of Winscombe	15 September 2014	present	Serving	Life
Conservative	Carlyn Chisholm, Baroness Chisholm of Owlpen	16 September 2014	28 November 2022	Resigned the Conservative whip, became non-affiliated	Life
Non-affiliated	Carlyn Chisholm, Baroness Chisholm of Owlpen	28 November 2022	present	Serving	Life
Conservative	Joanna Shields, Baroness Shields	16 September 2014	present	Serving	Life
Conservative	Arminka Helić, Baroness Helić	18 September 2014	present	Serving	Life
Labour	Gail Rebuck, Baroness Rebuck	18 September 2014	present	Serving	Life
Conservative	Nosheena Mobarik, Baroness Mobarik	19 September 2014	8 September 2017	Took a leave of absence to serve as an MEP	Life
Conservative	Nosheena Mobarik, Baroness Mobarik	1 February 2020	present	Serving	Life
Conservative	Karren Brady, Baroness Brady	22 September 2014	present	Serving	Life
Liberal Democrats	Kath Pinnock, Baroness Pinnock	23 September 2014	present	Serving	Life
Liberal Democrats	Barbara Janke, Baroness Janke	24 September 2014	present	Serving	Life
Crossbench	Alison Wolf, Baroness Wolf of Dulwich	2 December 2014	present	Serving	Life
Labour	Ros Altmann, Baroness Altmann	19 May 2015	7 September 2015	Expelled from the Labour Party, having already been a Conservative minister.	Life
Conservative	Ros Altmann, Baroness Altmann	7 September 2015	16 August 2024	Changed affiliation to non-affiliated	Life
Non-affiliated	Ros Altmann, Baroness Altmann	16 August 2024	present	Serving	Life
Lords Spiritual	Rachel Treweek, Bishop of Gloucester	15 June 2015	present	Serving	Spiritual
Lords Spiritual	Christine Hardman, Bishop of Newcastle	22 September 2015	30 November 2021	Retired	Spiritual
Conservative	Philippa Stroud, Baroness Stroud	1 October 2015	present	Serving	Life
Conservative	Anne McIntosh, Baroness McIntosh of Pickering	6 October 2015	present	Serving	Life
Conservative	Liz Redfern, Baroness Redfern	7 October 2015	present	Serving	Life
Conservative	Emma Pidding, Baroness Pidding	8 October 2015	present	Serving	Life
Conservative	Jane Scott, Baroness Scott of Bybrook	8 October 2015	present	Serving	Life
Liberal Democrats	Lorely Burt, Baroness Burt of Solihull	9 October 2015	7 May 2026	Resigned	Life
Conservative	Michelle Mone, Baroness Mone	15 October 2015	6 December 2022	Took a leave of absence	Life
Conservative	Kate Rock, Baroness Rock	15 October 2015	present	Serving	Life
Conservative	Ruby McGregor-Smith, Baroness McGregor-Smith	16 October 2015	18 January 2024	Changed affiliation to non-affiliated	Life
Non-affiliated	Ruby McGregor-Smith, Baroness McGregor-Smith	18 January 2024	present	Serving	Life
Liberal Democrats	Lynne Featherstone, Baroness Featherstone	20 October 2015	present	Serving	Life
Conservative	Simone Finn, Baroness Finn	20 October 2015	present	Serving	Life
Liberal Democrats	Dorothy Thornhill, Baroness Thornhill (Note: Also served as a directly-elected local authority mayor.)	21 October 2015	present	Serving	Life
Conservative	Catherine Fall, Baroness Fall	22 October 2015	present	Serving	Life
Liberal Democrats	Sharon Bowles, Baroness Bowles of Berkhamsted	23 October 2015	present	Serving	Life
Liberal Democrats	Shas Sheehan, Baroness Sheehan	26 October 2015	present	Serving	Life
Labour	Tessa Jowell, Baroness Jowell	27 October 2015	12 May 2018		Life
Crossbench	Julia King, Baroness Brown of Cambridge	30 October 2015	present	Serving	Life
Crossbench	Mary Watkins, Baroness Watkins of Tavistock	2 November 2015	present	Serving	Life
Labour	Dawn Primarolo, Baroness Primarolo	8 December 2015	present	Serving	Life
Conservative	Liz Sugg, Baroness Sugg	30 August 2016	present	Serving	Life
Conservative	Gabrielle Bertin, Baroness Bertin	2 September 2016	present	Serving	Life
Conservative	Philippa Roe, Baroness Couttie	5 September 2016	12 December 2022		Life
Conservative	Camilla Cavendish, Baroness Cavendish of Little Venice	6 September 2016	14 December 2016	Resigned from the Conservative Party	Life
Non-affiliated	Camilla Cavendish, Baroness Cavendish of Little Venice	14 December 2016	24 October 2019	Joined Crossbenchers	Life
Crossbench	Camilla Cavendish, Baroness Cavendish of Little Venice	24 October 2019	present	Serving	Life
Labour	Shami Chakrabarti, Baroness Chakrabarti	6 September 2016	present	Serving	Life
Conservative	Charlotte Vere, Baroness Vere of Norbiton	12 September 2016	present	Serving	Life
Conservative	Olivia Bloomfield, Baroness Bloomfield of Hinton Waldrist	13 September 2016	present	Serving	Life
Conservative	Laura Wyld, Baroness Wyld	22 June 2017	present	Serving	Life
Conservative	Rona Fairhead, Baroness Fairhead	19 October 2017	23 August 2022	Left Conservatives	Life
Non-affiliated	Rona Fairhead, Baroness Fairhead	23 August 2022	4 September 2023	Joined Crossbenchers	Life
Crossbench	Rona Fairhead, Baroness Fairhead	4 September 2023	present	Serving	Life
Lords Spiritual	Sarah Mullally, Archbishop of Canterbury (Note: Mullally was initially elevated as a Lord Spiritual as Bishop of London, before becoming Archbishop of Canterbury on 4 February 2026.)	10 April 2018	present	Serving	Spiritual
Conservative	Catherine Meyer, Baroness Meyer	19 June 2018	present	Serving	Life
Labour	Pauline Bryan, Baroness Bryan of Partick	20 June 2018	25 July 2025	Resigned	Life
Conservative	Amanda Sater, Baroness Sater	20 June 2018	present	Serving	Life
Conservative	Diana Barran, Baroness Barran	2 July 2018	present	Serving	Life
Crossbench	Rosie Boycott, Baroness Boycott	9 July 2018	present	Serving	Life
Crossbench	Deborah Bull, Baroness Bull	11 July 2018	present	Serving	Life
Lords Spiritual	Vivienne Faull, Bishop of Bristol	20 October 2018	1 September 2025	Resigned	Spiritual
Labour	Martha Osamor, Baroness Osamor	26 November 2018	present	Serving	Life
Conservative	Nicola Blackwood, Baroness Blackwood of North Oxford	4 February 2019	present	Serving	Life
Lords Spiritual	Libby Lane, Bishop of Derby	11 February 2019	present	Serving	Spiritual
Green	Natalie Bennett, Baroness Bennett of Manor Castle	7 October 2019	present	Serving	Life
Conservative	Elizabeth Sanderson, Baroness Sanderson of Welton	8 October 2019	present	Serving	Life
Crossbench	Heather Hallett, Baroness Hallett	11 October 2019	present	Serving	Life
Labour	Christine Blower, Baroness Blower	15 October 2019	present	Serving	Life
Crossbench	Ruth Hunt, Baroness Hunt of Bethnal Green	16 October 2019	present	Serving	Life
Crossbench	Margaret Ritchie, Baroness Ritchie of Downpatrick (Note: Also served as a Member of the Northern Ireland Forum.)	16 October 2019	20 October 2021	Joined the Labour Party	Life
Labour	Margaret Ritchie, Baroness Ritchie of Downpatrick	20 October 2021	present	Serving	Life
Conservative	Joanna Penn, Baroness Penn	21 October 2019	present	Serving	Life
Labour Co-op	Debbie Wilcox, Baroness Wilcox of Newport	4 November 2019	present	Serving	Life
Conservative	Nicky Morgan, Baroness Morgan of Cotes	6 January 2020	31 October 2024	Changed affiliation to non-affiliated	Life
Non-affiliated	Nicky Morgan, Baroness Morgan of Cotes	1 November 2024	present	Serving	Life
Labour	Katy Clark, Baroness Clark of Kilwinning	3 September 2020	19 May 2026	Resigned	Life
Conservative	Lorraine Fullbrook, Baroness Fullbrook of Dogmersfield	7 September 2020	31 December 2022	Took a leave of absence	Life
Crossbench	Gisela Stuart, Baroness Stuart of Edgbaston	7 September 2020	present	Serving	Life
Labour	Sue Hayman, Baroness Hayman of Ullock	9 September 2020	present	Serving	Life
Crossbench	Claire Fox, Baroness Fox of Buckley	14 September 2020	present	Serving	Life
Non-affiliated	Kate Hoey, Baroness Hoey	14 September 2020	present	Serving	Life
Conservative	Helena Morrissey, Baroness Morrissey	14 September 2020	present	Serving	Life
Conservative	Veronica Wadley, Baroness Fleet	8 October 2020	present	Serving	Life
Crossbench	Minouche Shafik, Baroness Shafik	15 October 2020	10 September 2025	Took a leave of absence	Life
Crossbench	Louise Casey, Baroness Casey of Blackstock	30 October 2020	present	Serving	Life
Conservative	Stephanie Fraser, Baroness Fraser of Craigmaddie	26 January 2021	present	Serving	Life
Labour	Judith Blake, Baroness Blake of Leeds	1 February 2021	present	Serving	Life
Labour	Gillian Merron, Baroness Merron	8 February 2021	present	Serving	Life
Conservative	Jacqueline Foster, Baroness Foster of Oxton	9 February 2021	present	Serving	Life
Labour	Jenny Chapman, Baroness Chapman of Darlington	1 March 2021	present	Serving	Life
Crossbench	Sue Black, Baroness Black of Strome	26 April 2021	present	Serving	Life
Conservative	Ruth Davidson, Baroness Davidson of Lundin Links	20 July 2021	present	Serving	Life
Lords Spiritual	Guli Francis-Dehqani, Bishop of Chelmsford	1 November 2021	present	Serving	Spiritual
Crossbench	Shaista Gohir, Baroness Gohir	24 June 2022	present	Serving	Life
Crossbench	Katherine Willis, Baroness Willis of Summertown	24 June 2022	present	Serving	Life
Labour	Sharon Taylor, Baroness Taylor of Stevenage	28 October 2022	present	Serving	Life
Conservative	Ruth Lea, Baroness Lea of Lymm	31 October 2022	30 April 2026	Resigned	Life
Conservative	Sheila Lawlor, Baroness Lawlor	3 November 2022	present	Serving	Life
Conservative	Teresa O'Neill, Baroness O'Neill of Bexley	7 November 2022	present	Serving	Life
Labour	Fiona Twycross, Baroness Twycross	7 November 2022	present	Serving	Life
Conservative	Angie Bray, Baroness Bray of Coln	8 November 2022	present	Serving	Life
Conservative	Dambisa Moyo, Baroness Moyo	8 November 2022	19 July 2024	Changed affiliation to non-affiliated	Life
Non-affiliated	Dambisa Moyo, Baroness Moyo	19 July 2024	present	Serving	Life
Crossbench	Arlene Foster, Baroness Foster of Aghadrumsee (Note: Also served as First Minister of Northern Ireland.)	9 November 2022	present	Serving	Life
Conservative	Kate Lampard, Baroness Lampard	17 November 2022	18 July 2024	Changed affiliation to non-affiliated	Life
Non-affiliated	Kate Lampard, Baroness Lampard	18 July 2024	present	Serving	Life
Labour	Ruth Smeeth, Baroness Anderson of Stoke-on-Trent	18 November 2022	present	Serving	Life
Labour	Frances O'Grady, Baroness O'Grady of Upper Holloway	9 December 2022	present	Serving	Life
Conservative	Kay Swinburne, Baroness Swinburne	20 June 2023	present	Serving	Life
Conservative	Charlotte Owen, Baroness Owen of Alderley Edge	12 July 2023	present	Serving	Life
Lords Spiritual	Helen-Ann Hartley, Bishop of Newcastle	21 September 2023	present	Serving	Spiritual
Non-affiliated	Sue Carr, Baroness Carr of Walton-on-the-Hill	6 November 2023	6 November 2023	Disqualified as Chief Justice of England and Wales	Life
Conservative	Ruth Porter, Baroness Porter of Fulwood	13 February 2024	present	Serving	Life
Conservative	Rosa Monckton, Baroness Monckton of Dallington Forest	12 March 2024	present	Serving	Life
Labour	Jane Ramsey, Baroness Ramsey of Wall Heath	13 March 2024	present	Serving	Life
Plaid Cymru	Carmen Smith, Baroness Smith of Llanfaes	13 March 2024	present	Serving	Life
Labour	Ayesha Hazarika, Baroness Hazarika	14 March 2024	present	Serving	Life
Crossbench	Alexandra Freeman, Baroness Freeman of Steventon	5 June 2024	present	Serving	Life
Labour	Jacqui Smith, Baroness Smith of Malvern	17 July 2024	present	Serving	Life
Liberal Democrats	Caroline Pidgeon, Baroness Pidgeon	12 August 2024	present	Serving	Life
Labour	Barbara Keeley, Baroness Keeley	13 August 2024	present	Serving	Life
Labour	Rosie Winterton, Baroness Winterton of Doncaster	13 August 2024	present	Serving	Life
Labour	Margaret Beckett, Baroness Beckett	14 August 2024	present	Serving	Life
Labour	Margaret Hodge, Baroness Hodge of Barking	14 August 2024	present	Serving	Life
Crossbench	Minette Batters, Baroness Batters	16 August 2024	present	Serving	Life
Labour	Harriet Harman, Baroness Harman	19 August 2024	present	Serving	Life
Conservative	Theresa May, Baroness May of Maidenhead	21 August 2024	present	Serving	Life
Crossbench	Hilary Cass, Baroness Cass	22 August 2024	present	Serving	Life
Conservative	Eleanor Laing, Baroness Laing of Elderslie	22 August 2024	present	Serving	Life
Labour	Catherine Smith, Baroness Smith of Cluny	9 October 2024	present	Serving	Life
Lords Spiritual	Debbie Sellin, Bishop of Peterborough	18 October 2024	present	Serving	Spiritual
Labour	Poppy Gustafsson, Baroness Gustafsson	15 November 2024	present	Serving	Life
Labour	Margaret Curran, Baroness Curran	15 January 2025	present	Serving	Life
Labour	Theresa Griffin, Baroness Griffin of Princethorpe	16 January 2025	present	Serving	Life
Conservative	Thérèse Coffey, Baroness Coffey	17 January 2025	present	Serving	Life
Labour	Lyn Brown, Baroness Brown of Silvertown	23 January 2025	present	Serving	Life
Labour	Alison Levitt, Baroness Levitt	23 January 2025	present	Serving	Life
Labour	Mary Bousted, Baroness Bousted	27 January 2025	present	Serving	Life
Labour	Julie Elliott, Baroness Elliott of Whitburn Bay	27 January 2025	present	Serving	Life
Conservative	Joanne Cash, Baroness Cash	28 January 2025	present	Serving	Life
Labour	Dinah Caine, Baroness Caine of Kentish Town	30 January 2025	present	Serving	Life
Labour	Kay Carberry, Baroness Carberry of Muswell Hill	30 January 2025	present	Serving	Life
Labour	Anne Longfield, Baroness Longfield	31 January 2025	9 December 2025	Took a leave of absence	Life
Labour	Wendy Nichols, Baroness Nichols of Selby	31 January 2025	present	Serving	Life
Labour	Wendy Alexander, Baroness Alexander of Cleveden	3 February 2025	present	Serving	Life
Labour	Deborah Mattinson, Baroness Mattinson	3 February 2025	present	Serving	Life
Labour	Sue Gray, Baroness Gray of Tottenham	4 February 2025	present	Serving	Life
Labour	Anji Hunter, Baroness Hunter of Auchenreoch	5 February 2025	present	Serving	Life
Conservative	Rachel Maclean, Baroness Maclean of Redditch	5 February 2025	present	Serving	Life
Labour Co-op	Luciana Berger, Baroness Berger	6 February 2025	present	Serving	Life
Labour	Thangam Debbonaire, Baroness Debbonaire	7 February 2025	present	Serving	Life
Labour	Anne Marie Rafferty, Baroness Rafferty	10 February 2025	present	Serving	Life
Lords Spiritual	Sophie Jelley, Bishop of Coventry	18 March 2025	present	Serving	Spiritual
Conservative	Amanda Spielman, Baroness Spielman	9 May 2025	present	Serving	Life
Conservative	Victoria Prentis, Baroness Prentis of Banbury	13 May 2025	present	Serving	Life
Conservative	Eleanor Shawcross, Baroness Shawcross-Wolfson	28 May 2025	present	Serving	Life
Crossbench	Sharon White, Baroness White of Tufnell Park	17 July 2025	present	Serving	Life
Labour	Liz Lloyd, Baroness Lloyd of Effra	13 October 2025	present	Serving	Life
Crossbench	Clare Gerada, Baroness Gerada	24 November 2025	present	Serving	Life
Crossbench	Polly Neate, Baroness Neate	26 November 2025	present	Serving	Life
Lords Spiritual	Joanne Grenfell, Bishop of St Edmundsbury and Ipswich	12 December 2025	present	Serving	Spiritual
Labour	Brenda Dacres, Baroness Dacres of Lewisham	7 January 2026	present	Serving	Life
Labour	Shama Tatler, Baroness Shah	9 January 2026	present	Serving	Life
Labour	Sara Hyde, Baroness Hyde of Bemerton	12 January 2026	present	Serving	Life
Labour	Tracey Paul, Baroness Paul of Shepherd's Bush	13 January 2026	present	Serving	Life
Labour	Neena Gill, Baroness Gill	14 January 2026	present	Serving	Life
Labour	Carol Linforth, Baroness Linforth	14 January 2026	present	Serving	Life
Conservative	Sharron Davies, Baroness Davies of Devonport	15 January 2026	present	Serving	Life
Labour	Catherine MacLeod, Baroness MacLeod of Camusdarach	16 January 2026	present	Serving	Life
Labour	Farmida Bi, Baroness Bi	19 January 2026	present	Serving	Life
Labour	Katie Martin, Baroness Martin of Brockley	20 January 2026	present	Serving	Life
Labour	Geeta Nargund, Baroness Nargund	21 January 2026	present	Serving	Life
Liberal Democrats	Sarah Teather, Baroness Teather	27 January 2026	present	Serving	Life
Labour	Sophy Antrobus, Baroness Antrobus	28 January 2026	present	Serving	Life
Liberal Democrats	Rhiannon Leaman, Baroness Leaman	29 January 2026	present	Serving	Life
Labour	Ann Limb, Baroness Limb	5 February 2026	present	Serving	Life
Crossbench	Katherine Grainger, Baroness Grainger	20 April 2026	present	Serving	Life
Lords Spiritual	Sarah Clark, Bishop of Ely	23 July 2026	present	Serving	Spiritual
Labour	Christina McAnea, Baroness McAnea	17 August 2026	present	Serving	Life
Labour	Alison Lowe, Baroness Lowe of Armley	18 August 2026	present	Serving	Life
Labour	June Sarpong, Baroness Sarpong	21 August 2026	present	Serving	Life
Labour	Ruth Mackenzie, Baroness Mackenzie of Sherwood	24 August 2026	present	Serving	Life
Labour	Barbara Mills, Baroness Mills of Greenwich	28 August 2026	present	Serving	Life
Liberal Democrats	Julia Aglionby, Baroness Aglionby	1 September 2026	present	Serving	Life
Labour	Alison Garnham, Baroness Garnham	1 September 2026	present	Serving	Life
Labour	Cathy Ashley, Baroness Ashley of Lambeth	2 September 2026	present	Serving	Life
Liberal Democrats	Hannah Kitching, Baroness Kitching of Penistone	2 September 2026	present	Serving	Life
Labour	Kitty Ussher, Baroness Ussher	3 September 2026	present	Serving	Life

== See also ==
- List of current members of the House of Lords
- Lists of female political office-holders in the United Kingdom
  - List of female cabinet members of the United Kingdom
- List of peerages created for women
- List of peerages inherited by women
- Women in the House of Commons of the United Kingdom
  - List of female members of the Parliament of the United Kingdom
- Women in the House of Lords
