= David Hart =

David Hart may refer to:

- Dave Hart (c. 1925–2009), American football coach, college athletics administrator
- David Hart (actor) (born 1954), American actor
- David Hart (footballer) (born 1964), Australian rules footballer
- David Hart (poet) (fl. 2000s), British poet (see News from the Republic of Letters)
- David Hart (political activist) (1944–2011), British right-wing political activist and avant-garde film maker
- David Hart (trade unionist) (1940–2013), English trade union leader
- David Hart (water polo) (born 1951), water polo player and coach
- David Ananda Hart (1954–2024), British radical theologian, Anglican priest and convert to Hinduism
- David Bentley Hart (born 1965), Eastern Orthodox theologian and cultural commentator
- David Berry Hart (1851–1920), Scottish surgeon and professor
- David Liebe Hart (born 1955), American entertainer
- David Hart Smith (born 1985), Canadian professional wrestler
- David Montgomery Hart (1927–2001), American social historian and sociologist

== See also ==
- David Harte (disambiguation)
