= Russell Hobby =

Russell Hobby may refer to:

- Russell Hobby (fencer) (born 1933), Australian fencer
- Russell Hobby (trade unionist) (born 1972), British trade union leader
