= 2025 political peerages =

Nominations for life peers in the UK

On 10 December 2025, 34 life peerages were announced, 25 from Labour, 3 from the Conservatives, 5 from the Liberal Democrats and 1 crossbench peer.

== Life peerages ==
=== Crossbench ===
- The Rt. Hon. Charles Hay (The Earl of Kinnoull) DL – Convenor of the Crossbench Peers, Deputy Speaker of the House of Lords, former Chair of the House of Lords European Union Committee; to be Baron Kinnoull of the Ochils, of Abernyte in the County of Perthshire – 6 February 2026

=== Conservative ===
- Sharron Davies MBE – Campaigner for Women's Rights and Olympic Swimming Silver Medallist for Great Britain; to be Baroness Davies of Devonport, of Bradford-on-Avon in the County of Wiltshire – 15 January 2026
- Simon Heffer – Professor of Modern British History at the University of Buckingham and historian, journalist, author and political commentator; to be Baron Blackwater, of Great and Little Leighs in the County of Essex – 27 January 2026
- The Rt. Hon. Sir John Redwood – Former Cabinet Minister and Member of Parliament for Wokingham; to be Baron Redwood, of Wokingham in the Royal County of Berkshire – 30 January 2026

=== Liberal Democrats ===
- Mike Dixon – Chief Executive of the Liberal Democrats, former charity leader and Government policy adviser; to be Baron Dixon of Jericho, of Jericho in the City of Oxford – 28 January 2026
- The Rt. Hon. Dominic Hubbard (Lord Addington) – Liberal Democrat spokesperson for disabilities in the House of Lords and Honorary President of the British Dyslexia Association; to be Baron Hubbard, of Lambourne in the Royal County of Berkshire - 18 February 2026
- Rhiannon Leaman – Chief of Staff to the Leader of the Liberal Democrats; to be Baroness Leaman, of Chipping Sodbury in the County of Gloucestershire – 29 January 2026
- The Rt. Hon. John Russell (Earl Russell) – Liberal Democrat spokesperson for energy and climate change in the House of Lords; to be Baron Russell of Forest Hill, of Forest Hill in the London Borough of Lewisham – 30 March 2026
- Sarah Teather – Charity leader, former MP for Brent East and Brent Central and former Minister of State at the Department for Education; to be Baroness Teather, of Broughton in the County of Leicestershire – 27 January 2026

=== Labour ===
- Andy (Andrew) Roe KFSM – chair of the national Building Safety Regulator and former London Fire Commissioner; to be Baron Roe of West Wickham, of West Wickham in the London Borough of Bromley – 13 January 2026
- Dame Ann Limb DBE DL – Former Further Education College Principal and former chair, The Scouts; Pro Chancellor, University of Surrey, and Chair of City & Guilds Foundation, Lloyds Bank Foundation, and The King's Foundation; to be Baroness Limb, of Moss Side in the City of Manchester – 5 February 2026
- Brenda Dacres OBE – Mayor of Lewisham; to be Baroness Dacres of Lewisham, of Deptford in the London Borough of Lewisham – 7 January 2026
- Carol Linforth OBE – Lately Labour Party Chief of Staff (Operations); to be Baroness Linforth, of Redland in the City of Bristol – 14 January 2026
- Catherine MacLeod – Former journalist and political adviser, visiting professor at King's College London and Non-Executive Director at the Scotland Office; to be Baroness MacLeod of Camusdarach, of Lochaber in the County of Inverness-shire – 16 January 2026
- David Isaac CBE – Provost of Worcester College, Oxford, Chair of the University of the Arts London, Chair of the Henry Moore Foundation, and a trustee of Cumberland Lodge; to be Baron Isaac, of Abergavenny in the County of Monmouthshire – 19 January 2026
- David Pitt-Watson – Responsible Investment Expert. Co-founder and former CEO of the Equity Ownership Service and Focus Funds at Federated Hermes; to be Baron Pitt-Watson, of Kirkland of Glencairn in the County of Dumfriesshire – 15 January 2026
- Farmida Bi CBE – Chair of Norton Rose Fulbright LLP, Vice-chair of the Disasters Emergency Committee; to be Baroness Bi, of Bermondsey in the London Borough of Southwark – 19 January 2026
- Professor Geeta Nargund – Founder and former medical director of Create Fertility; founder and Trustee of Health Equality Foundation; to be Baroness Nargund, of Wimbledon in the London Borough of Merton and of Tooting in the London Borough of Wandsworth – 21 January 2026
- Katie Martin – Lately, Chief of Staff to the Chancellor of the Exchequer; to be Baroness Martin of Brockley of Ladywell in the London Borough of Lewisham – 20 January 2026
- Joe Docherty – Chair of Northern Powergrid Foundation and Trustee, Esmee Fairbairn Foundation, former Chair of Council, Durham University; to be Baron Docherty of Milngavie, of Alexandria in the County of Dunbartonshire – 12 January 2026
- Len (Leonard) Duvall OBE – Chair of the London Assembly and Leader of the London Assembly Labour Group; to be Baron Duvall, of Woolwich in the Royal Borough of Greenwich – 8 January 2026
- Matthew Doyle – Former Director of Communications to the Prime Minister and for the Labour Party; to be Baron Doyle, of Great Barford in the County of Bedfordshire – 8 January 2026
- Sir Michael Barber – Chancellor, University of Exeter and adviser to the Prime Minister on effective delivery; to be Baron Barber of Chittlehampton, of Chittlehampton in the County of Devon – 21 January 2026
- Neena Gill CBE – Former Member of the European Parliament for the West Midlands; to be Baroness Gill, of Jewellery Quarter in the City of Birmingham and of Southall in the London Borough of Ealing – 14 January 2026
- Nick (Nicholas) Forbes CBE – chair, Breaking Down Barriers Commission and former Labour Leader, Newcastle City Council; to be Baron Forbes of Newcastle, of Heaton in the City of Newcastle upon Tyne – 9 January 2026
- Peter Babudu – Executive Director of Impact on Urban Health, former councillor in Southwark; to be Baron Babudu, of Peckham in the London Borough of Southwark – 17 January 2026
- Peter John OBE – Former Southwark Leader and former Chair of London Councils; to be Baron John of Southwark, of Pattiswick in the County of Essex – 7 January 2026
- Richard Walker OBE – Founder and chairman, Bywater and Executive Chairman, Iceland Foods; to be Baron Walker of Broxton, of Broxton in the County of Cheshire – 20 January 2026
- Russell Hobby CBE – CEO, The Kemnal Academies Trust, former CEO, Teach First and former General Secretary of the National Association of Head Teachers; to be Baron Hobby, of Belmont in the London Borough of Sutton – 30 January 2026
- Cllr. Dr. Sara Hyde – Fabian Society Chair and Islington council's Executive Member for Health and Social Care; to be Baroness Hyde of Bemerton, of King's Cross in the London Borough of Islington – 12 January 2026
- Cllr. Shama Tatler – Brent Councillor and vice-chair of the London Labour Regional Executive, Patron of the Labour Housing Group and Head of the Labour Group Office at the Local Government Association; to be Baroness Shah, of Wembley in the London Borough of Brent – 9 January 2026
- Dr. Sophy Antrobus MBE – Senior Research Fellow and co-director of the Freeman Air and Space Institute at King's College London; to be Baroness Antrobus, of Old Sarum in the County of Wiltshire – 28 January 2026
- Tracey Paul – Chief Communications Officer at Pool Reinsurance and former policy adviser; to be Baroness Paul of Shepherd's Bush, of Shepherd’s Bush in the London Borough of Hammersmith and Fulham – 13 January 2026
- Uday Nagaraju – Technology Consultant, Politician and Founder of AI Policy Labs; to be Baron Nagaraju, of Bloomsbury in the London Borough of Camden – 29 January 2026
