= List of female cabinet members of the United Kingdom =

Seventy-two women have been appointed to positions in the Cabinet of the United Kingdom, with three female prime ministers. Since, by convention, members of the cabinet must be a member of either the House of Commons or House of Lords the prime minister could not appoint women to the cabinet until the Parliament (Qualification of Women) Act 1918 allowed women to stand for MP, and could not appoint peeresses to it until the Life Peerages Act 1958. (Note: Although around 90 hereditary peerages can be inherited by women, it was not until the Peerage Act 1963 that a woman who had inherited a peerage could receive a writ of summons to the House of Lords.)

Baroness Amos became the first black woman to be appointed to the cabinet in 2003. In 2011, Justine Greening became the first member of the cabinet who was openly LGBT, although she did not come out 2016.

== Female prime ministers ==
Three women have led the cabinet as prime minister.

denotes the first female minister of that particular department.

Name	Party	Start	End	Concurrent Roles
Margaret Thatcher	Conservative	1979	1990	First Lord of the Treasury; Minister for the Civil Service
Theresa May	Conservative	2016	2019	First Lord of the Treasury; Minister for the Civil Service
Liz Truss	Conservative	2022	2022	First Lord of the Treasury; Minister for the Civil Service; Minister for the Union

== Female cabinet members ==
denotes the first female minister of that particular department.

Name	Party	Portfolio(s)	Start	End	Ref
Margaret Bondfield	Labour	Minister of Labour	1929	1931	
Ellen Wilkinson	Labour	Minister of Education	1945	1947	
Florence Horsbrugh	Conservative	Minister of Education	1951	1954	
Barbara Castle	Labour	Minister of Overseas Development	1964	1965	
Barbara Castle	Labour	Minister of Transport	1965	1968	
Barbara Castle	Labour	Secretary of State for Employment and Productivity	1968	1970	
Barbara Castle	Labour	First Secretary of State	1968	1970	
Barbara Castle	Labour	Secretary of State for Health and Social Services	1974	1976	
Judith Hart	Labour	Paymaster General	1968	1969	
Margaret Thatcher	Conservative	Secretary of State for Education and Science	1970	1974	
Shirley Williams	Labour	Secretary of State for Prices and Consumer Protection	1974	1976	
Shirley Williams	Labour	Secretary of State for Education and Science	1976	1979	
Shirley Williams	Labour	Paymaster General	1976	1979	
Janet Young, Baroness Young	Conservative	Leader of the House of Lords	1981	1983	
Janet Young, Baroness Young	Conservative	Chancellor of the Duchy of Lancaster	1981	1982	
Janet Young, Baroness Young	Conservative	Lord Privy Seal	1982	1983	
Virginia Bottomley	Conservative	Secretary of State for Health	1992	1995	
Virginia Bottomley	Conservative	Secretary of State for National Heritage	1995	1997	
Gillian Shephard	Conservative	Secretary of State for Employment	1992	1993	
Gillian Shephard	Conservative	Minister of Agriculture, Fisheries and Food	1993	1994	
Gillian Shephard	Conservative	Secretary of State for Education	1994	1995	
Gillian Shephard	Conservative	Secretary of State for Education and Employment	1995	1997	
Margaret Beckett	Labour	Secretary of State for Trade and Industry	1997	1998	
Margaret Beckett	Labour	President of the Board of Trade	1997	1998	
Margaret Beckett	Labour	Leader of the House of Commons	1998	2001	
Margaret Beckett	Labour	Lord President of the Council	1998	2001	
Margaret Beckett	Labour	Secretary of State for Environment, Food and Rural Affairs	2001	2006	
Margaret Beckett	Labour	Secretary of State for Foreign and Commonwealth Affairs	2006	2007	
Harriet Harman	Labour	Secretary of State for Social Security	1997	1998	
Harriet Harman	Labour	Minister for Women	1997	1998	
Harriet Harman	Labour	Leader of the House of Commons	2007	2010	
Harriet Harman	Labour	Lord Privy Seal	2007	2010	
Harriet Harman	Labour	Minister for Women and Equality	2007	2010	
Harriet Harman	Labour	Chair of the Labour Party	2007	2010	
Mo Mowlam	Labour	Secretary of State for Northern Ireland	1997	1999	
Mo Mowlam	Labour	Minister for the Cabinet Office	1999	2001	
Mo Mowlam	Labour	Chancellor of the Duchy of Lancaster	1999	2001	
Margaret Jay, Baroness Jay of Paddington	Labour	Leader of the House of Lords	1998	2001	
Margaret Jay, Baroness Jay of Paddington	Labour	Lord Privy Seal	1998	2001	
Margaret Jay, Baroness Jay of Paddington	Labour	Minister for Women	1998	2001	
Clare Short	Labour	Secretary of State for International Development	1997	2003	
Ann Taylor	Labour	Leader of the House of Commons	1997	1998	
Ann Taylor	Labour	Lord President of the Council	1997	1998	
Helen Liddell	Labour	Secretary of State for Scotland	2001	2003	
Estelle Morris	Labour	Secretary of State for Education and Skills	2001	2002	
Patricia Hewitt	Labour	Secretary of State for Trade and Industry	2001	2005	
Patricia Hewitt	Labour	Minister for Women	2001	2005	
Patricia Hewitt	Labour	Secretary of State for Health	2005	2007	
Tessa Jowell	Labour	Secretary of State for Culture, Media and Sport	2001	2007	
Tessa Jowell	Labour	Minister for Women	2005	2006	
Tessa Jowell	Labour	Minister for the Olympics	2005	2007	
Tessa Jowell	Labour	Minister for the Cabinet Office	2009	2010	
Tessa Jowell	Labour	Minister for London (Note: First woman to serve in cabinet in the position.)	2009	2010	
Valerie Amos, Baroness Amos	Labour	Secretary of State for International Development	2003	2003	
Valerie Amos, Baroness Amos	Labour	Leader of the House of Lords	2003	2007	
Valerie Amos, Baroness Amos	Labour	Lord President of the Council	2003	2007	
Ruth Kelly	Labour	Secretary of State for Education and Skills	2004	2006	
Ruth Kelly	Labour	Secretary of State for Communities and Local Government	2006	2007	
Ruth Kelly	Labour	Minister for Women	2006	2007	
Ruth Kelly	Labour	Secretary of State for Transport	2007	2008	
Hilary Armstrong	Labour	Minister for the Cabinet Office	2006	2007	
Hilary Armstrong	Labour	Chancellor of the Duchy of Lancaster	2006	2007	
Hilary Armstrong	Labour	Minister for Social Exclusion	2006	2007	
Hazel Blears	Labour	Chair of the Labour Party	2006	2007	
Hazel Blears	Labour	Minister without Portfolio	2006	2007	
Hazel Blears	Labour	Secretary of State for Communities and Local Government	2007	2009	
Cathy Ashton, Baroness Ashton of Upholland	Labour	Leader of the House of Lords	2007	2008	
Cathy Ashton, Baroness Ashton of Upholland	Labour	Lord President of the Council	2007	2008	
Jacqui Smith	Labour	Secretary of State for the Home Department	2007	2009	
Yvette Cooper	Labour	Chief Secretary to the Treasury	2008	2009	
Yvette Cooper	Labour	Secretary of State for Work and Pensions	2009	2010	
Yvette Cooper	Labour	Secretary of State for the Home Department	2024	2025	
Yvette Cooper	Labour	Secretary of State for Foreign, Commonwealth and Development Affairs	2025	2026	
Yvette Cooper	Labour	Secretary of State for Health and Social Care	2026	present	
Jan Royall, Baroness Royall of Blaisdon	Labour	Leader of the House of Lords	2008	2010	
Jan Royall, Baroness Royall of Blaisdon	Labour	Lord President of the Council	2008	2009	
Jan Royall, Baroness Royall of Blaisdon	Labour	Chancellor of the Duchy of Lancaster	2009	2010	
Cheryl Gillan	Conservative	Secretary of State for Wales	2010	2012	
Theresa May	Conservative	Secretary of State for the Home Department	2010	2016	
Theresa May	Conservative	Minister for Women and Equalities	2010	2012	
Caroline Spelman	Conservative	Secretary of State for Environment, Food and Rural Affairs	2010	2012	
Sayeeda Warsi, Baroness Warsi	Conservative	Chair of the Conservative Party	2010	2012	
Sayeeda Warsi, Baroness Warsi	Conservative	Minister without Portfolio	2010	2012	
Justine Greening	Conservative	Secretary of State for Transport	2011	2012	
Justine Greening	Conservative	Secretary of State for International Development	2012	2016	
Justine Greening	Conservative	Secretary of State for Education	2016	2018	
Justine Greening	Conservative	Minister for Women and Equalities	2016	2018	
Maria Miller	Conservative	Secretary of State for Culture, Media and Sport	2012	2014	
Maria Miller	Conservative	Minister for Women and Equalities	2012	2014	
Theresa Villiers	Conservative	Secretary of State for Northern Ireland	2012	2016	
Theresa Villiers	Conservative	Secretary of State for Environment, Food and Rural Affairs	2019	2020	
Nicky Morgan	Conservative	Secretary of State for Education	2014	2016	
Nicky Morgan	Conservative	Minister for Women and Equalities	2014	2016	
Nicky Morgan	Conservative	Secretary of State for Digital, Culture, Media and Sport	2019	2020	
Tina Stowell, Baroness Stowell of Beeston	Conservative	Leader of the House of Lords	2014	2016	
Tina Stowell, Baroness Stowell of Beeston	Conservative	Lord Privy Seal	2014	2016	
Liz Truss	Conservative	Secretary of State for Environment, Food and Rural Affairs	2014	2016	
Liz Truss	Conservative	Secretary of State for Justice	2016	2017	
Liz Truss	Conservative	Lord Chancellor	2016	2017	
Liz Truss	Conservative	Secretary of State for International Trade	2019	2021	
Liz Truss	Conservative	President of the Board of Trade	2019	2021	
Liz Truss	Conservative	Minister for Women and Equalities	2019	2022	
Liz Truss	Conservative	Secretary of State for Foreign, Commonwealth and Development Affairs	2021	2022	
Amber Rudd	Conservative	Secretary of State for Energy and Climate Change	2015	2016	
Amber Rudd	Conservative	Secretary of State for the Home Department	2016	2018	
Amber Rudd	Conservative	Secretary of State for Work and Pensions	2018	2019	
Amber Rudd	Conservative	Minister for Women and Equalities	2018	2018	
Karen Bradley	Conservative	Secretary of State for Culture, Media and Sport	2016	2017	
Karen Bradley	Conservative	Secretary of State for Digital, Culture, Media and Sport	2017	2018	
Karen Bradley	Conservative	Secretary of State for Northern Ireland	2018	2019	
Natalie Evans, Baroness Evans of Bowes Park	Conservative	Leader of the House of Lords	2016	2022	
Natalie Evans, Baroness Evans of Bowes Park	Conservative	Lord Privy Seal	2016	2022	
Andrea Leadsom	Conservative	Secretary of State for Environment, Food and Rural Affairs	2016	2017	
Andrea Leadsom	Conservative	Secretary of State for Business, Energy and Industrial Strategy	2019	2020	
Priti Patel	Conservative	Secretary of State for International Development	2016	2017	
Priti Patel	Conservative	Secretary of State for the Home Department	2019	2022	
Penny Mordaunt	Conservative	Secretary of State for International Development	2017	2019	
Penny Mordaunt	Conservative	Minister for Women and Equalities	2018	2019	
Penny Mordaunt	Conservative	Secretary of State for Defence	2019	2019	
Penny Mordaunt	Conservative	Leader of the House of Commons	2022	2024	
Penny Mordaunt	Conservative	Lord President of the Council	2022	2024	
Esther McVey	Conservative	Secretary of State for Work and Pensions	2018	2018	
Thérèse Coffey	Conservative	Secretary of State for Work and Pensions	2019	2022	
Thérèse Coffey	Conservative	Deputy Prime Minister	2022	2022	
Thérèse Coffey	Conservative	Secretary of State for Health and Social Care	2022	2022	
Thérèse Coffey	Conservative	Secretary of State for Environment, Food and Rural Affairs	2022	2023	
Amanda Milling	Conservative	Chair of the Conservative Party	2020	2021	
Amanda Milling	Conservative	Minister without Portfolio	2020	2021	
Anne-Marie Trevelyan	Conservative	Secretary of State for International Development	2020	2021	
Anne-Marie Trevelyan	Conservative	Secretary of State for International Trade	2021	2022	
Anne-Marie Trevelyan	Conservative	President of the Board of Trade	2021	2022	
Anne-Marie Trevelyan	Conservative	Secretary of State for Transport	2022	2022	
Nadine Dorries	Conservative	Secretary of State for Digital, Culture, Media and Sport	2021	2022	
Michelle Donelan	Conservative	Secretary of State for Education	2022	2022	
Michelle Donelan	Conservative	Secretary of State for Digital, Culture, Media and Sport	2022	2023	
Michelle Donelan	Conservative	Secretary of State for Science, Innovation and Technology (Note: Minister on Leave from 28 April 2023 to 20 July 2023.)	2023	2024	
Kemi Badenoch	Conservative	Secretary of State for International Trade	2022	2023	
Kemi Badenoch	Conservative	President of the Board of Trade	2022	2024	
Kemi Badenoch	Conservative	Secretary of State for Business and Trade	2023	2024	
Suella Braverman	Conservative	Secretary of State for the Home Department	2022	2022	
Suella Braverman	Conservative	Secretary of State for the Home Department	2022	2023	
Chloe Smith	Conservative	Secretary of State for Work and Pensions	2022	2022	
Chloe Smith	Conservative	Secretary of State for Science, Innovation and Technology (acting)	2023	2023	
Gillian Keegan	Conservative	Secretary of State for Education	2022	2024	
Lucy Frazer	Conservative	Secretary of State for Culture, Media and Sport	2023	2024	
Claire Coutinho	Conservative	Secretary of State for Energy Security and Net Zero	2023	2024	
Victoria Atkins	Conservative	Secretary of State for Health and Social Care	2023	2024	
Louise Haigh	Labour	Secretary of State for Transport	2024	2024	
Louise Haigh	Labour	First Secretary of State	2026	present	
Louise Haigh	Labour	Chancellor of the Duchy of Lancaster	2026	present	
Louise Haigh	Labour	Minister for the Cabinet Office	2026	present	
Liz Kendall	Labour	Secretary of State for Work and Pensions	2024	2025	
Liz Kendall	Labour	Secretary of State for Science, Innovation and Technology	2025	2026	
Shabana Mahmood	Labour	Secretary of State for Justice	2024	2025	
Shabana Mahmood	Labour	Lord Chancellor	2024	2025	
Shabana Mahmood	Labour	Secretary of State for the Home Department	2025	present	
Lisa Nandy	Labour	Secretary of State for Culture, Media and Sport	2024	2026	
Lisa Nandy	Labour	Secretary of State for Digital, Culture, Media and Sport	2026	present	
Bridget Phillipson	Labour	Secretary of State for Education	2024	2026	
Bridget Phillipson	Labour	Minister for Women and Equalities	2026 (Note: Appointed in 2024, but did not attend cabinet until 2026.)	present	
Bridget Phillipson	Labour	Chair of the Labour Party	2026	present	
Lucy Powell	Labour	Leader of the House of Commons	2024	2025	
Lucy Powell	Labour	Lord President of the Council	2024	2025	
Lucy Powell	Labour	Secretary of State for Education	2026	present	
Angela Rayner	Labour	Deputy Prime Minister	2024	2025	
Angela Rayner	Labour	Secretary of State for Levelling Up, Housing and Communities	2024	2024	
Angela Rayner	Labour	Secretary of State for Housing, Communities and Local Government	2024	2025	
Angela Rayner	Labour	Secretary of State for Housing, Communities and Local Government	2026	present	
Rachel Reeves	Labour	Chancellor of the Exchequer	2024	2026	
Angela Smith, Baroness Smith of Basildon	Labour	Leader of the House of Lords	2024	present	
Angela Smith, Baroness Smith of Basildon	Labour	Lord Privy Seal	2024	present	
Jo Stevens	Labour	Secretary of State for Wales	2024	2026	
Heidi Alexander	Labour	Secretary of State for Transport	2024	present	
Emma Reynolds	Labour	Secretary of State for Environment, Food and Rural Affairs	2025	2026	
Angela Eagle	Labour	Secretary of State for Environment, Food and Rural Affairs	2026	present	
Miatta Fahnbulleh	Labour	Secretary of State for Energy Security and Net Zero	2026	present	
Anneliese Midgley	Labour	Government Chief Whip in the House of Commons (Note: First woman to serve as a full member of Cabinet in the position.)	2026	present	
Anneliese Midgley	Labour	Parliamentary Secretary to the Treasury	2026	present	

== Female ministers also attending cabinet ==
Some roles, such as the Attorney General, can attend cabinet meetings without being a full member of the cabinet.

denotes the first female minister of that particular department.

Name	Party	Portfolio(s)	Start	End	Ref
Ann Taylor	Labour	Government Chief Whip in the House of Commons	1998	2001	
Ann Taylor	Labour	Parliamentary Secretary to the Treasury	1998	2001	
Hilary Armstrong	Labour	Government Chief Whip in the House of Commons	2001	2006	
Hilary Armstrong	Labour	Parliamentary Secretary to the Treasury	2001	2006	
Jacqui Smith	Labour	Government Chief Whip in the House of Commons	2006	2007	
Jacqui Smith	Labour	Parliamentary Secretary to the Treasury	2006	2007	
Yvette Cooper	Labour	Minister of State for Housing and Planning (Note: Appointed in 2006, but did not attend cabinet until 2007.)	2007	2008	
Beverley Hughes	Labour	Minister of State for Children, Young People and Families (Note: Appointed in 2006, but did not attend cabinet until 2007.)	2007	2009	
Tessa Jowell	Labour	Minister for the Olympics	2007	2010	
Tessa Jowell	Labour	Paymaster General	2007	2010	
Patricia Scotland, Baroness Scotland of Asthal	Labour	Attorney General for England and Wales	2007	2010	
Patricia Scotland, Baroness Scotland of Asthal	Labour	Advocate General for Northern Ireland	2010	2010	
Caroline Flint	Labour	Minister of State for Housing and Planning	2008	2008	
Caroline Flint	Labour	Minister of State for Europe	2008	2009	
Jan Royall, Baroness Royall of Blaisdon	Labour	Government Chief Whip in the House of Lords	2008	2008	
Jan Royall, Baroness Royall of Blaisdon	Labour	Captain of the Honourable Corps of Gentlemen-at-Arms	2008	2008	
Margaret Beckett	Labour	Minister of State for Housing and Planning	2008	2009	
Dawn Primarolo	Labour	Minister of State for Children, Young People and Families	2009	2010	
Rosie Winterton	Labour	Minister of State for Regional Economic Development and Coordination	2009	2010	
Rosie Winterton	Labour	Minister of State for Local Government	2009	2010	
Sayeeda Warsi, Baroness Warsi	Conservative	Senior Minister of State for Foreign and Commonwealth Affairs	2012	2014	
Sayeeda Warsi, Baroness Warsi	Conservative	Minister of State for Faith and Communities	2012	2014	
Nicky Morgan	Conservative	Financial Secretary to the Treasury	2014	2014	
Nicky Morgan	Conservative	Minister for Women	2014	2014	
Joyce Anelay, Baroness Anelay of St Johns	Conservative	Minister of State for Foreign and Commonwealth Affairs	2014	2017	
Esther McVey	Conservative	Minister of State for Employment	2014 (Note: Appointed in 2013, but did not attend cabinet until 2014.)	2015	
Esther McVey	Conservative	Minister of State for Housing and Planning	2019	2020	
Esther McVey	Conservative	Minister without Portfolio in the Cabinet Office	2023	2024	
Priti Patel	Conservative	Minister of State for Employment	2015	2016	
Anna Soubry	Conservative	Minister of State for Small Business, Industry and Enterprise	2015	2016	
Andrea Leadsom	Conservative	Leader of the House of Commons	2017	2019	
Andrea Leadsom	Conservative	Lord President of the Council	2017	2019	
Liz Truss	Conservative	Chief Secretary to the Treasury	2017	2019	
Caroline Nokes	Conservative	Minister of State for Immigration	2018	2019	
Claire Perry	Conservative	Minister of State for Energy and Clean Growth	2018 (Note: Appointed in 2017, but did not attend cabinet until 2018.)	2019	
Suella Braverman	Conservative	Attorney General for England and Wales	2020 (Note: Minister on Leave from 2 March 2021 to 10 September 2021.)	2022	
Suella Braverman	Conservative	Advocate General for Northern Ireland	2020	2022	
Michelle Donelan	Conservative	Minister of State for Higher and Further Education	2021 (Note: Appointed in 2020, but did not attend cabinet until 2021.)	2022	
Vicky Ford	Conservative	Minister of State for Development	2022	2022	
Wendy Morton	Conservative	Government Chief Whip in the House of Commons	2022	2022	
Wendy Morton	Conservative	Parliamentary Secretary to the Treasury	2022	2022	
Victoria Prentis	Conservative	Attorney General for England and Wales	2022	2024	
Victoria Prentis	Conservative	Advocate General for Northern Ireland	2022	2024	
Laura Trott	Conservative	Chief Secretary to the Treasury	2023	2024	
Anneliese Dodds	Labour	Minister of State for Development	2024	2025	
Anneliese Dodds	Labour	Minister of State for Women and Equalities	2024	2025	
Ellie Reeves	Labour	Minister without Portfolio	2024 (Note: Appointed in July 2024, but did not attend cabinet until December 2024.)	2025	
Ellie Reeves	Labour	Attorney General for England and Wales	2026	present	
Ellie Reeves	Labour	Advocate General for Northern Ireland	2026	present	
Jenny Chapman, Baroness Chapman of Darlington	Labour	Minister of State for International Development, Latin America and Caribbean	2025	2026	
Anna Turley	Labour	Minister without Portfolio	2025	2026	
Anna Turley	Labour	Chair of the Labour Party	2025	2026	
Emma Reynolds	Labour	Chief Secretary to the Treasury	2026	present	

== See also ==
- List of female members of the Parliament of the United Kingdom
- List of female members of the House of Lords
