= Mick Brookes =

Michael John Patrick Brookes (born May 1948) is a retired English trade union leader.

Brookes was educated at Fullbrook County Secondary School in West Byfleet in Surrey, before completing a teaching certificate at King Alfred's College in Winchester. He spent a year working on a kibbutz in Israel then briefly sold paraffin before becoming a primary school teacher. In 1978, he became the headteacher of Gosberton, Clogh and Risegate Primary School, then in 1985 moved to become head at Sherwood Junior School in Nottinghamshire.

Brookes became active in the National Association of Head Teachers (NAHT), and in 2000 was elected as its national president. In 2005, he was elected as general secretary of the union, defeating David Hawker, his predecessor's preferred candidate. He was the first primary school head to lead the union. As secretary, he opposed government plans to cut teaching time and led a boycott of National Curriculum assessments. He retired in 2010, and set up a consultancy focused on coaching headteachers.

In his spare time, Brookes enjoyed riding motorbikes and undertook the 2,000km Enduro Africa event. He also played bass in The Rockets, a blues and rock covers band.

Trade union offices
Preceded by David Hart	General Secretary of the National Association of Head Teachers; 2005–2010	Succeeded by Russell Hobby
