= Geeta Nargund, Baroness Nargund =

British professor

The Right Honourable The Baroness Nargund FRCOG
- Official portrait, 2026
- Born: 23 October 1959 (age 67); Mysore State, India
- Education: Karnataka Institute of Medical Sciences; Royal College of Obstetricians and Gynaecologists
- Occupations: Professor; Physician; Entrepreneur

Member of the House of Lords
- Lord Temporal
- Life peerage 21 January 2026

Personal details
- Party: Labour
- Website: www.geetanargund.com

Geeta Nargund, Baroness Nargund FRCOG (born 23 October 1959) is a British professor, physician, and entrepreneur who is known for her work in the field of natural and mild IVF and Advanced Ultrasound Technology in Reproductive Medicine.

== Education and early career ==
Nargund was born in 1959 in Mysore State, now Karnataka, India. Nargund received her MBBS at Karnataka Medical College and Research Institute in Hubli, India and at the Royal College of Obstetricians and Gynaecologists in London.

== Medical career ==
Nargund is the founder of CREATE Fertility and ABC IVF. She was the founder CEO for many years and served as the Medical Director of the company until 1 July 2025. Nargund has served as a senior consultant gynaecologist and lead consultant for reproductive medicine services at St George's Hospital.

She was appointed as Pro-Chancellor of the University of Portsmouth in July 2025. Nargund is currently an Honorary Professor of Women’s Health at City St George's, University of London, and has served as an Honorary Professor of women's health at the University of Greater Manchester, UK and Visiting Professor at Hasselt University Medical Faculty, Belgium. She is an accredited trainer for infertility and gynaecological ultrasound modules at the Royal College of Obstetricians and Gynaecologists (RCOG) London and the British Fertility Society (BFS).

Nargund implements the use of follicular Doppler in assessing egg quality in humans. She has also published the first scientific paper on 'Cumulative conception and live birth rates in natural (unstimulated) IVF cycles'. As co-author, she won the 'Robert Edwards Prize' for best paper of the year 2014 for a paper on the innovative 'Simplified Culture System', which allows IVF to be performed without a conventional laboratory.

Nargund is also the Founder and Trustee of Health Equality Foundation, formerly known as Create Health Foundation.

She is passionate about prevention of infertility, and protecting women's health and safety during assisted conception treatment and has pioneered UK's first fertility education initiative in secondary schools.

She was a Co-Editor-in-Chief for the European scientific journal Facts, Views and Vision in ObGyn. Served on the international editorial board of the Journal of Human Reproductive Sciences.

Currently serves as an International Advisory Board member of The Lancet Obstetrics, Gynaecology, & Women's Health journal and on the editorial board of Reproductive Bio Medicine Online scientific journal.

She was a member of the Steering Committee of the ESHRE Task Force and a member of the group in terminology for the World Health Organisation assisted reproductive technology (ART).

Currently President of International Society for Mild Approaches in Assisted Reproduction (ISMAAR).

== Media career ==
In the press, Nargund is a regular contributor to The Huffington Post and has appeared on Woman's Hour on BBC Radio 4. She has also published commentaries in The Daily Telegraph, The Independent, The Guardian, The Times, BBC, The Sun, ITV, Cosmopolitan, and the International Business Times UK. She is a full member of the Guild of Health Writers UK. She delivered a TEDx talk on "Empowering Young People with Fertility Education in 2017.

== Current posts ==
- Pro-Chancellor of The University of Portsmouth
- Honorary Professor of Women’s Health at City St George's, University of London
- Authority Member, Human Fertilisation and Embryology Authority
- Founder and Trustee, Health Equality Foundation (formerly known as Create Health Foundation)
- Chair, The Pipeline (Executive Pipeline Ltd)

== Political career ==
As part of the 2025 Political Peerages, Nargund was nominated for a life peerage to sit in the House of Lords as a Labour Party peer; she was created Baroness Nargund, of Wimbledon in the London Borough of Merton and of Tooting in the London Borough of Wandsworth on 21 January 2026. Nargund was appointed as a Lords board member for the Parliamentary Office of Science and Technology (POST).

== Charitable work ==
Nargund has been involved in a range of charitable and non-profit organisations focused on health equity, reproductive medicine, humanitarian work, and emergency support services, including holding several roles with the British Red Cross.

- Health Equality Foundation 2000-current
- British Red Cross 2015-2026
  - Vice-Chair 2021-2026
  - Board Trustee 2018-2026
  - Vice President, London 2016-2018
- London Emergencies Trust, Board Trustee 2017-2020

== Honours and awards ==
- 2025 Metro Pride Award for "Equality, Diversity and Inclusion"
- 2023 GG2 Leadership and Diversity Inspire Award
- 2020 Economic Innovator of the Year Award: Spectator Magazine
- 2018 Lloyds Developmental Capital: Top 50 Ambitious Leaders
- 2017 London Business School: Real Innovation Awards, People’s Choice Award
- 2017 Special Award - Doctor of the Year - British Association for Physicians of Indian Origin
- 2016 Top ten most influential Asian women in Britain - Asian Sunday Newspaper
- 2015 Daily Telegraph UK STEM Awards Hero
- 2015 Winner at annual Inspiration Awards for Women
- 2014 Winner of RBS Chairman's Award for most outstanding candidate at the Asian Women of Achievement Awards 2014 for her work in advancing safer, more accessible fertility treatments in the UK and across the world
- 2013 Winner of Red Magazines Hot Women Award for charity work

== Publications ==
- Development of in vitro maturation for human oocytes: natural and mild approaches to clinical infertility treatment, 2017
- Changes in practice make analysis of historical databases irrelevant for comparison between Natural and Stimulated IVF, 2017
- Closing the gender health gap, 2022
