= Paul Whiteman (trade unionist) =

Paul Whiteman (born 1968) is an English trade union leader.

Born in Croydon, Whiteman's father was an official with the Banking, Insurance and Finance Union (BIFU). In 1986, Whiteman began working at the TSB bank in Orpington, and also joined BIFU. After his father retired, he became increasingly active in the union, chairing its Lloyds TSB committee. He received a bursary to study a masters' degree in industrial relations and employment law part-time at Keele University.

After completing his studies, Whiteman took up a full-time post with the FDA union, then in 2012 moved to become Director of Representation and Advice at the National Association of Head Teachers (NAHT). In 2017, he was elected as general secretary of the NAHT, also winning election to the General Council of the Trades Union Congress.

Trade union offices
| Preceded by Russell Hobby | General Secretary of the National Association of Head Teachers; 2017–present | Succeeded by Incumbent |
