= David Harte =

David Harte may refer to:

- David Harte (field hockey)
- David Harte (Gaelic footballer)

== See also ==
- David Hart (disambiguation)
