= Peter John, Baron John of Southwark =

British politician

The Right Honourable The Lord John of Southwark
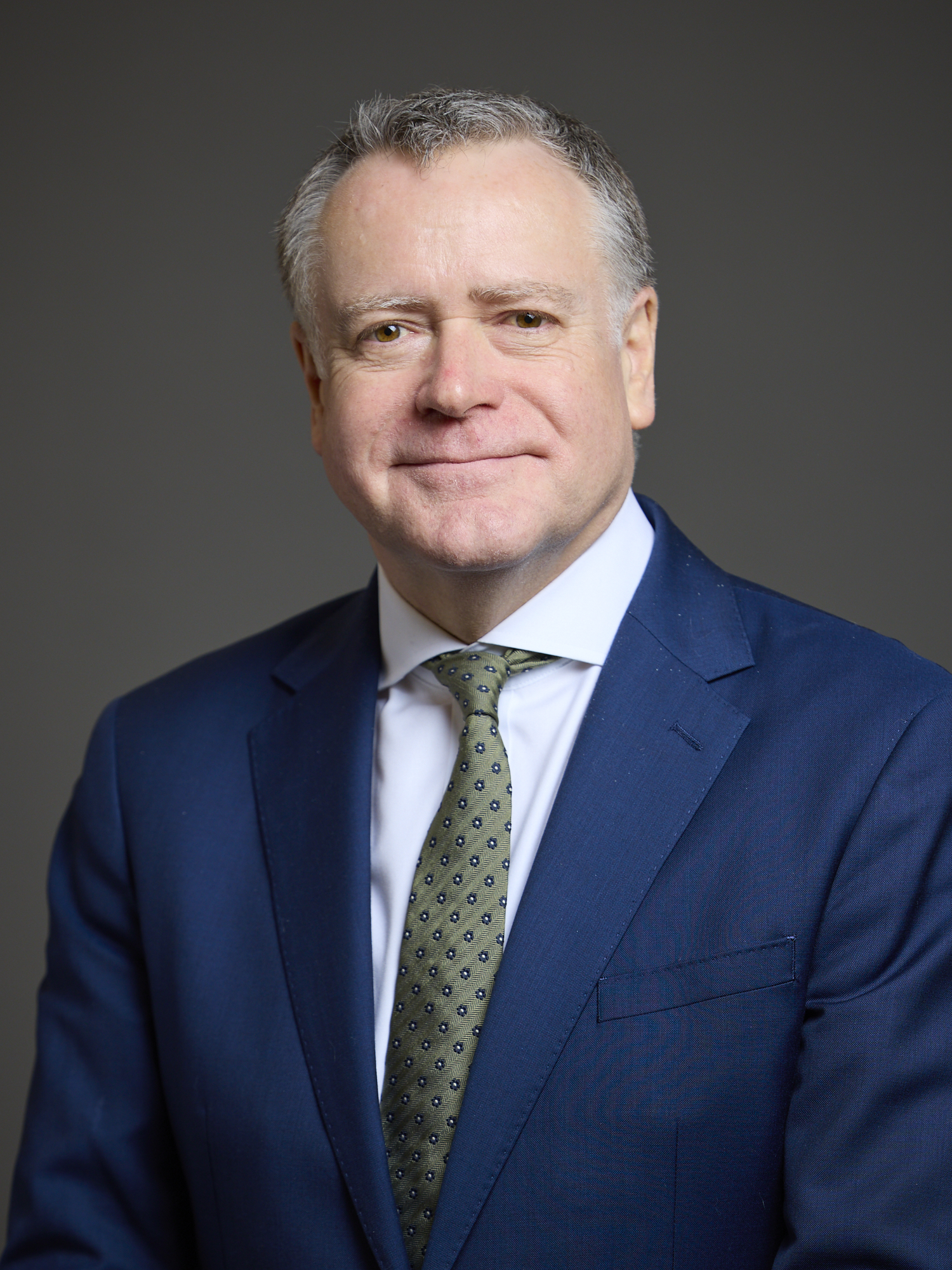
- Official portrait, 2026

Leader of Southwark London Borough Council
- In office 19 May 2010 – 16 September 2020
- Preceded by: Nick Stanton
- Succeeded by: Kieron Williams

Member of the House of Lords
- Lord Temporal
- Life peerage 7 January 2026

Personal details
- Party: Labour

Peter Charles John, Baron John of Southwark is a British politician.

== Career ==
John became leader of Southwark Labour in 2004, after being first elected to South Camberwell ward in 2002. In 2020, he stepped down as leader of Southwark London Borough Council after 10 years. He was given a life peerage as a part of 2025 Political Peerages and he was created Baron John of Southwark, of Pattiswick in the County of Essex, on 7 January 2026.
