= Mike Dixon, Baron Dixon of Jericho =

British politician

The Right Honourable The Lord Dixon of Jericho
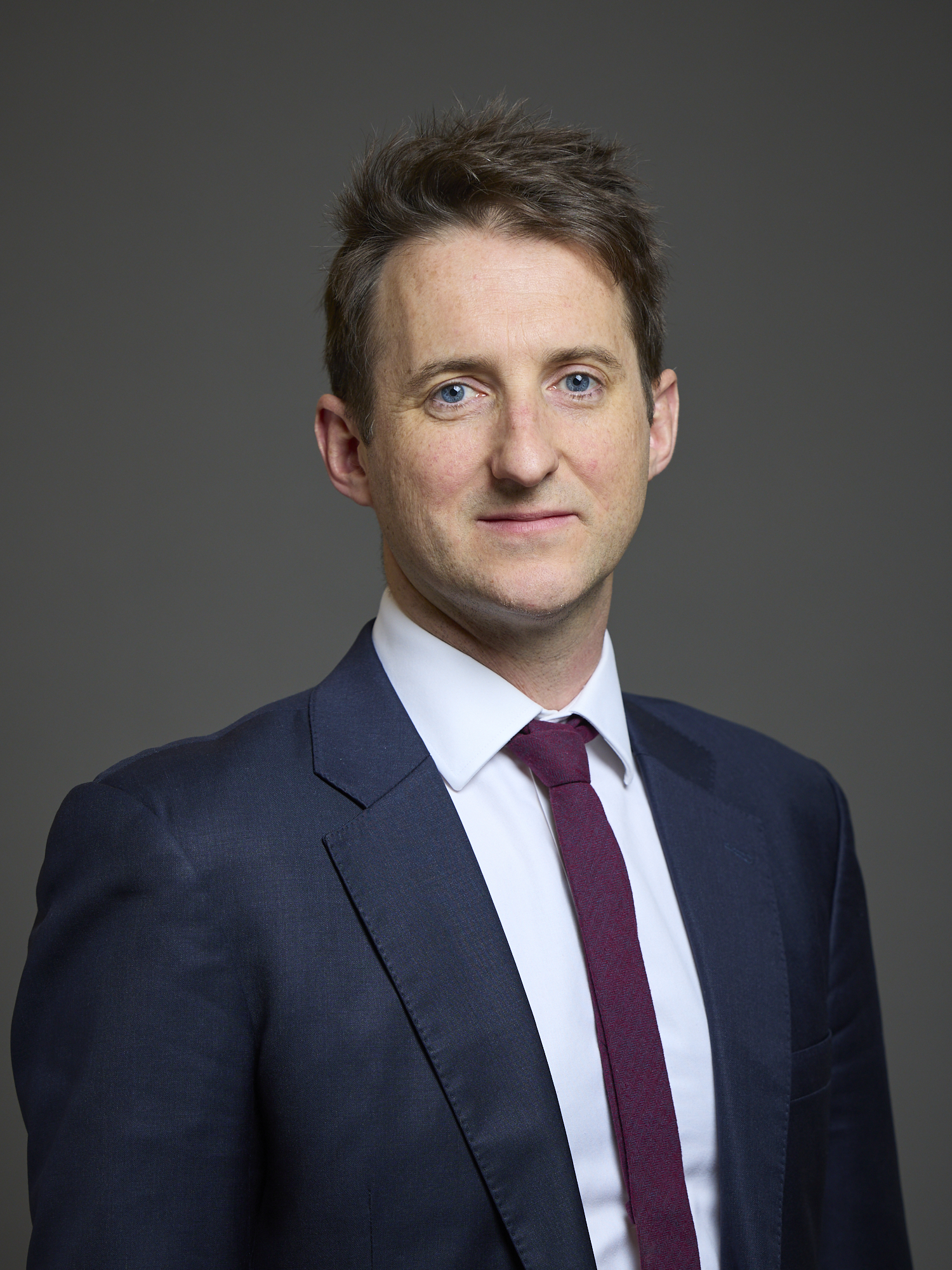
- Official portrait, 2026

Member of the House of Lords
- Lord Temporal
- Life peerage 28 January 2026

Personal details
- Born: Michael Henry Dixon
- Party: Liberal Democrats

Michael Henry Dixon, Baron Dixon of Jericho is a British politician from the Liberal Democrats.

== Career ==
In politics Dixon served in several roles as Special Adviser roles in the Labour Govt, including Senior Adviser to the Head of Policy in the Prime Minister’s office in the period 2006-2009 according to his profile on LinkedIn. Dixon was also previously Chief Executive of Addaction. In 2019, he was appointed Chief Executive of the Liberal Democrats. He was nominated for a life peerage as part of the 2025 Political Peerages; he was created as Baron Dixon of Jericho, of Jericho in the City of Oxford on 28 January 2026.
