= Rhiannon Leaman, Baroness Leaman =

British political aide

The Right Honourable The Baroness Leaman

Member of the House of Lords
- Lord Temporal
- Life peerage 29 January 2026

Personal details
- Party: Liberal Democrats

Rhiannon Victoria Leaman, Baroness Leaman is a British political aide.

== Career ==
Rhiannon Leaman previously worked for Save the Children.

She is a longtime staffer for the Liberal Democrats, who was head of national campaigns for the party. In 2019, she was promoted to Chief of staff to Jo Swinson.

Leaman later served as Chief of staff to Leader of the Liberal Democrats Ed Davey. She was nominated for a life peerage as part of the 2025 Political Peerages to sit as a Liberal Democrat peer in the House of Lords; she was created as Baroness Leaman, of Chipping Sodbury in the County of Gloucestershire on 29 January 2026.

== Personal life ==
Leaman grew up in Chipping Sodbury with her brother and sister and her mum was an NHS Nurse.

She lives in Leighton Buzzard.
