= Tracey Paul, Baroness Paul of Shepherd's Bush =

British political aide

The Right Honourable The Baroness Paul of Shepherd's Bush
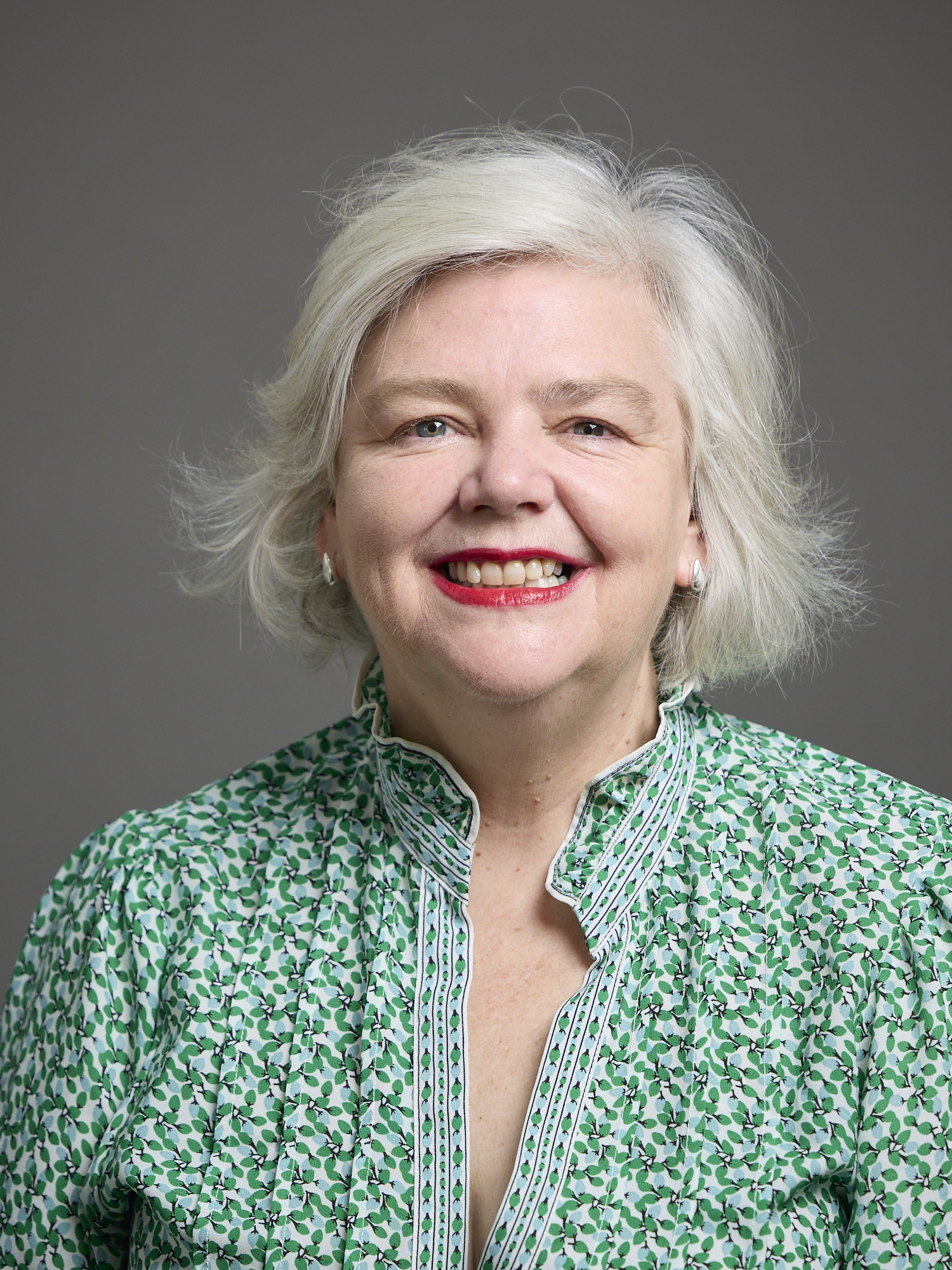
- Official portrait, 2026

Member of the House of Lords
- Lord Temporal
- Life peerage 13 January 2026

Personal details
- Party: Labour

Tracey Amanda Paul, Baroness Paul of Shepherd's Bush is a British civil servant.

== Career ==
Tracey Paul was previously chief of staff for Dame Louise Casey on the review of community cohesion and extremism. Paul was Chief Communications Officer at Pool Reinsurance. She is the former head of elections for the Labour Party. She was policy manager of the NCS Trust. She was nominated for a life peerage as part of the 2025 Political Peerages and was created Baroness Paul of Shepherd's Bush, of Shepherd's Bush in the London Borough of Hammersmith and Fulham on 13 January 2026.
