= Farmida Bi, Baroness Bi =

British solicitor

The Right Honourable The Baroness Bi CBE

Member of the House of Lords
- Lord Temporal
- Life peerage 19 January 2026

Personal details
- Born: 2 September 1967 (age 59) Pakistan
- Party: Labour
- Education: Downing College, Cambridge (MA)

Farmida Bi, Baroness Bi, CBE is a British corporate solicitor and the EMEAPAC Chair of Norton Rose Fulbright, having also served as Global Chair in 2022. She is the United Kingdom's first female chair of a major law firm, and has been named one of Britain's top five most powerful Muslim women. She stood as a Labour Party candidate in two elections, and founded Progressive British Muslims three days after the 7/7 London bombings. In January 2026 she was appointed to the House of Lords as a Labour peer as Baroness Bi of Bermondsey, and she was previously appointed a CBE in the 2020 Birthday Honours for services to Law and charity.

== Early life and education ==
Bi was born in Pakistan, and moved to the United Kingdom at the age of six. She read law at Downing College at the University of Cambridge.

== Career ==
Bi trained as a solicitor at Clifford Chance, before working as an associate at JPMorgan and Cleary Gottlieb Steen & Hamilton. She qualified as a New York attorney and was partner at Denton Wilde Sapte from 2002 to 2008, following which she joined Norton Rose Fulbright.

She was appointed Chair of EMEA at Norton Rose Fulbright in 2018, making her the first female chair of a major law firm in the United Kingdom, and she continues in that role, as EMEAPAC Chair following the firm's EMEA and Australia integration in 2025. She also served as the firm's Global Chair in 2022.

In the wider industry, she has served as Chair of the International Regulatory Strategy Group (IRSG) Council since August 2023. The IRSG is a cross-sectoral forum for the financial and related professional services industry that promotes regulation to encourage open and competitive global markets. Since August 2023 she has also served as a board member of the CityUK, the industry-led body representing UK-based financial and related professional services, which champions and supports the UK financial sector and the interests of its members, particularly in international trade.

In the charitable sector, Bi has served as Vice-Chair of the Disasters Emergency Committee since 2023. From 2021-25 she was Chair of the Barbican Centre Trust (the registered charity supporting the Barbican Centre), and she was Chair of the Patchwork Foundation (a charity promoting the integration of disadvantaged and minority communities into public life) from 2018-25.

In the 2005 United Kingdom general election, she stood as a Labour Party candidate in Mole Valley, Surrey, winning 10.7% of the vote. Bi also ran as the Labour candidate for the Hillside ward in the 2006 Merton London Borough Council election, winning 13.2% of the vote.

== Awards and honours ==
She was recognised in the Financial News' Fifty Most Influential Lawyers 2025 and its Most Influential Women in Finance 2025.

Previously, in 2009, Bi was named one of the United Kingdom's five most powerful Muslim women. She was a nominated for the British Muslim Awards in 2013, 2014 and 2015 for services to finance and accounts, and services to law. In 2018, she was named one of the Financial Times' Top 10 most innovative lawyers and listed in Cranfield University's 2019 Women to Watch supplement. She was included in the Women Role Model list in 2019. She was appointed a CBE in the 2020 Birthday Honours for services to Law and charity. Bi has been recognised for her commitment to action towards diversity and inclusion in the workplace. She is Chair of the Patchwork Foundation and Barbican Centre Trust, and has been trustee of the Muslim Youth Helpline. She was appointed an Honorary Fellow of Downing College, Cambridge in June 2022. As part of the 2025 Political Peerages, Bi was nominated to receive a life peerage to sit in the House of Lords as a Labour peer; she was created as Baroness Bi, of Bermondsey in the London Borough of Southwark on 19 January 2026.
