= Catherine MacLeod, Baroness MacLeod of Camusdarach =

British journalist

The Right Honourable The Baroness MacLeod of Camusdarach
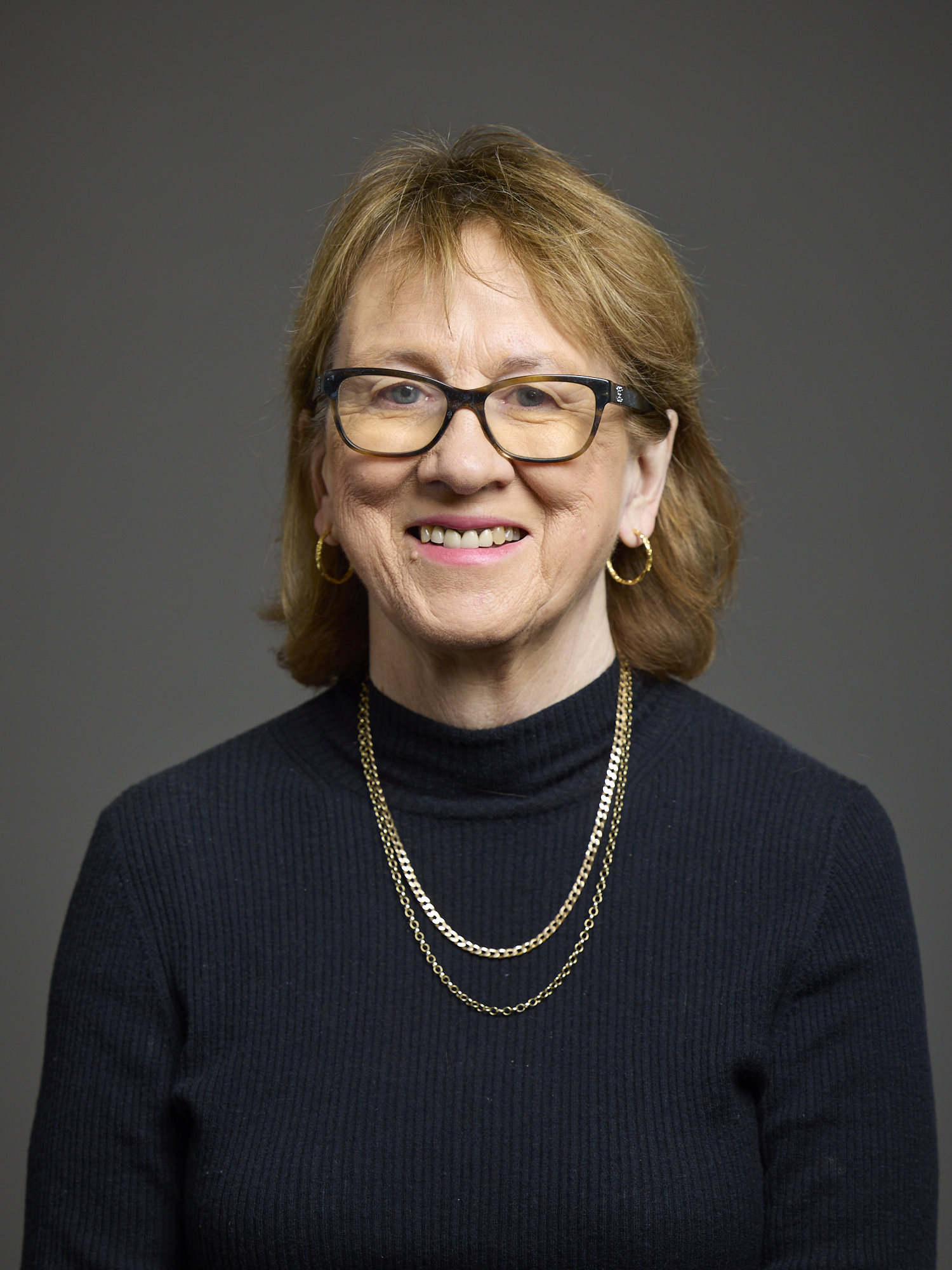
- Official portrait, 2026

Member of the House of Lords
- Lord Temporal
- Life peerage 16 January 2026

Personal details
- Party: Labour

Catherine Margaret MacLeod, Baroness MacLeod of Camusdarach is a British journalist.

== Career ==
Catherine MacLeod was former political editor of The Herald and was a special adviser to Alistair Darling when he was Chancellor of the Exchequer. She is a visiting professor at King's College London and Non-Executive Director at the Scotland Office. In 2024, she joined Charlotte Street Partners as a senior adviser. She was given a life peerage in December as part of the 2025 Political Peerages; she was created as Baroness MacLeod of Camusdarach, of Lochaber in the County of Inverness-shire on 16 January 2026.
