= National Association of Head Teachers =

British trade union

NAHT
- National Association of Head Teachers
- Founded: March 27, 1897; 129 years ago
- Headquarters: Centenary House, 93-95 Borough High Street, London, SE1 1NL
- Location: United Kingdom
- Members: ▲49,785 (2024)
- General Secretary: Paul Whiteman
- Affiliations: TUC; GFTU
- Website: naht.org.uk

The NAHT is a trade union and professional association representing more than 49,000 members in England, Wales and Northern Ireland. Members hold leadership positions in early years; primary; special and secondary schools; independent schools; sixth form and FE colleges; outdoor education centres; pupil referral units, social services establishments and other educational settings.

The union was founded in 1897 as the National Federation of Head Teachers' Associations. In 1906, it became the National Association of Head Teachers, from the initials of which its current name derives.

The union's membership grew from just over 1,000 in 1898 to 10,000 in 1947, and 20,000 by the 1980s. For many years, membership was restricted to headteachers, but deputy headteachers were admitted from 1985, and assistant headteachers from 2000.

== General Secretaries ==
1897: J. Edwards
1901: E. F. Farthing
c.1915: Dougherty
c.1921: H. J. Jackson
1928: R. J. Shambrook
1930: Thomas Tibbey
1934: Gordon Barry
1952: William J. W. Glossop
1966: Robert Cook
1978: David Hart
2005: Mick Brookes
2010: Russell Hobby
2017: Paul Whiteman
