= Ann Limb, Baroness Limb =

British educationalist, business leader and philanthropist

The Right Honorable The Baroness Limb DBE DL
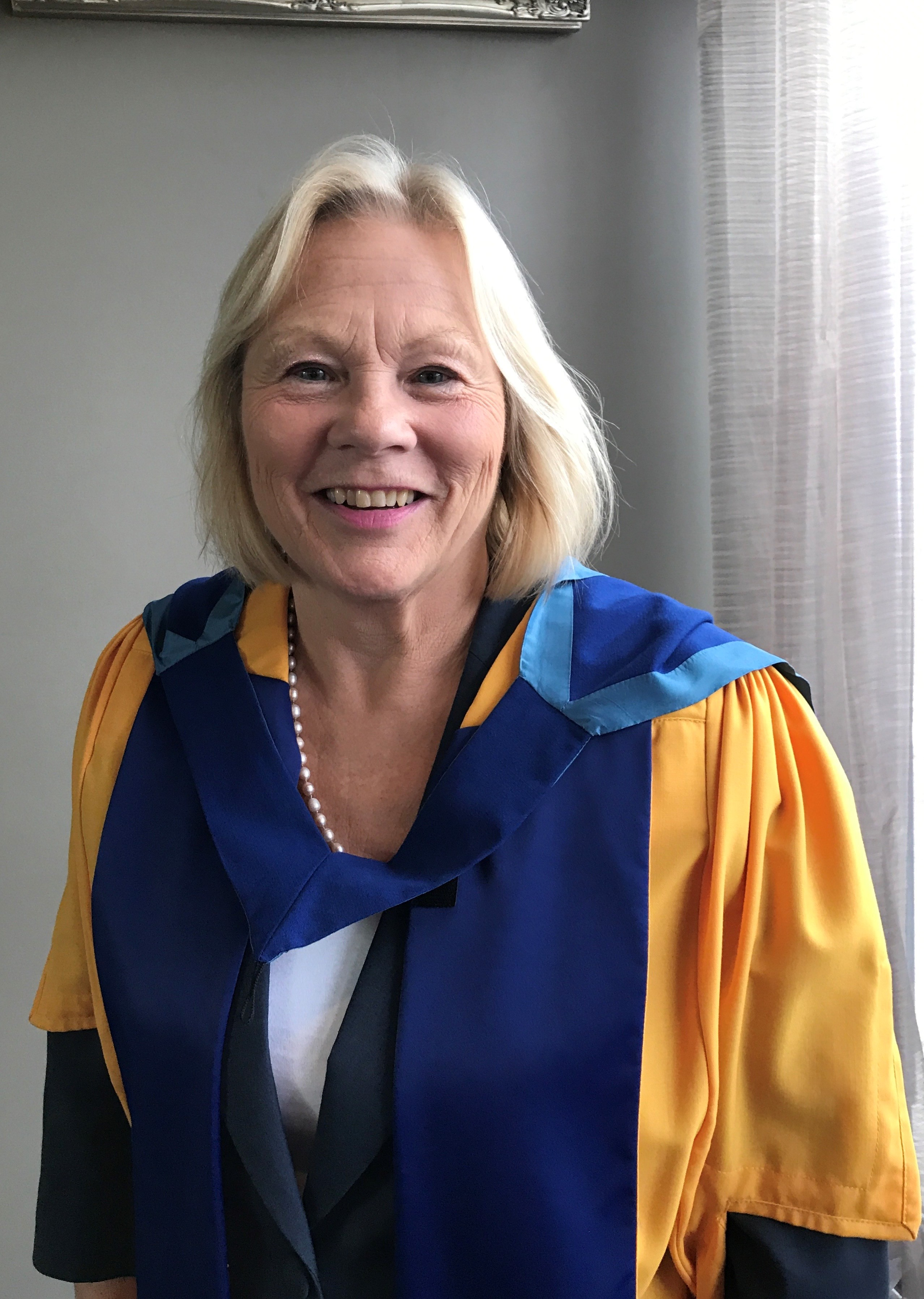
- Limb in 2021

Member of the House of Lords
- Lord Temporal
- Life peerage 5 February 2026

Personal details
- Born: Ann Geraldine Limb; 13 February 1953 (age 73) Moss Side, Manchester, England
- Party: Labour
- Spouse: Margaret Cook (m. 2019)
- Education: University of Liverpool

Ann Geraldine Limb, Baroness Limb, DBE DL (born 13 February 1953) is a British educationalist, business leader, charity chair and philanthropist. In September 2015, she became the first woman Chair of The Scout Association since the organisation was founded by Robert Baden-Powell in 1907. Limb also served, in 2023–2024, as the 789th High Sheriff of Buckinghamshire, the first Quaker to hold this office. Nominated for a life peerage as part of the 2025 Political Peerages to sit in the House of Lords as Labour peer, Limb faced calls for the honour to be revoked after having falsely claimed to hold both MA and PhD degrees; Limb was nonetheless created Baroness Limb, of Moss Side in the City of Manchester, on 5 February 2026. In January 2026, the Charity Commission launched a statutory enquiry into the sale of charitable assets of the City and Guilds of London Institute, of which she was Chair, to private equity backed PeopleCert.

== Early life and education ==
Limb was born in Stretford Memorial Hospital, and lived for the first five years of her life in Moss Side, Manchester. The daughter of a butcher, she was a pupil at Norbury Hall Primary School and passed the 11+ to study at Marple Hall County Grammar School for Girls, now Marple Hall School, followed by studying French at the University of Liverpool. She is a Fellow Commoner of Lucy Cavendish College, Cambridge. Limb claimed to hold both MA and PhD degrees, but in December 2025 The Sunday Times reported that neither had been awarded.

== Career ==
=== Career in further education ===
From 1976 until 2001, Limb had a career in further education (FE). In December 1987, aged 34, she was appointed Principal of Milton Keynes College, at the time the youngest ever FE college principal. After a decade, she moved to Cambridge Regional College, serving as Principal there until 2000. She then took up the post of Chief Executive of the University for Industry (Ufi).

=== Economic development and housing ===
From 2005 to 2011, Limb was the Chair of the Milton Keynes Partnership and a Ministerial appointee to the Board of Homes England. From 2011 to 2019, Limb was chair of the country's top performing LEP, South East Midlands Local Enterprise Partnership (SEMLEP).

Between 2017 and 2023, Limb served as the independent business Chair of the UK Innovation Corridor.

=== Arts and culture ===
From 2012 to 2026, Limb was Chair of IF: Milton Keynes International Festival, a multi-arts festival that engages people with music and sound in unusual spaces and places. The biennial festival, founded in 2010, runs for ten days in July across central Milton Keynes.

Limb was a member of the Council of Arts Council England South East Regional Council between 2014 and 2021 and led the bid for Milton Keynes to be European Capital of Culture in 2023.

=== Charitable roles ===
In June 2021, Limb became a trustee of The King's Foundation. In September 2021 she was appointed Vice Chair, and in January 2025 was elected chair of the board of trustees.

In July 2022, Limb was appointed Chair of the Lloyds Bank Foundation.

=== Voluntary educational roles ===
Limb is a member of the WorldSkills UK's Skills taskforce for global Britain, Chair of the City & Guilds Group's City and Guilds of London Institute, Chair of the Lifelong Education Institute, part of Res Publica, Chair of the Board of Governors of The Manchester College, and a board member of the LTE Group.

== Other roles ==
From 2016 to 2020, Limb served as Chairman of the Executive Committee, and Deputy Chairman of the General Committee, of her London club, the Athenaeum. She served as Chairman of the General Committee from 2021 to 2024, being succeeded by Sir Philip May.

== Honours and awards ==
Limb was appointed an Officer of the Order of the British Empire (OBE) "For public service and for services to Education" in the 2011 Birthday Honours, a Commander of the Order of the British Empire (CBE) "For political service" in the 2015 Birthday Honours and a Dame Commander of the Order of the British Empire (DBE) "for services to young people and philanthropy" in the 2022 Birthday Honours.

She is a deputy lieutenant of the county of Buckinghamshire, and served a term as the High Sheriff of Buckinghamshire in 2023–2024.

Her academic honours include Fellow of the Chartered Institution for Further Education, Fellow of the Royal Society of Arts (FRSA), Fellow of the City and Guilds of London Institute (FCGI), Inaugural Fellow of Milton Keynes College, and honorary doctorates from Anglia Ruskin University, the University of Bedfordshire, The Open University, Manchester Metropolitan University, the University of Northampton, Sheffield Hallam University, and the University of West London. She is a fellow commoner of Lucy Cavendish College, Cambridge.

In 2019, Limb was named in the Northern Power Women 2019 Power List as an inspiring role model and agent of change, rooted in the North of England. In the same year, she was also celebrated as #1 LGBTQ+ public sector role model on the 2019 "OUTstanding LGBT+ Role Model Lists", supported by Yahoo Finance and published annually by diversity charity INvolve.

== Media appearances ==
Upon taking up her role as Chair of the Scouts in 2015, Limb was interviewed by Emma Barnett on BBC Radio 4's Woman's Hour. She subsequently appeared as a guest on Radio 4's Great Lives nominating George Fox, founder of Quakerism. In December 2023, Limb appeared on BBC2's quiz programme Christmas University Challenge as part of the University of Liverpool alumni team.

== Controversies ==
In June 2023, Limb faced criticism from members of the Athenaeum Club over her management, with much of the public concern about financial aspects of the running of the club. Critics claimed a renegotiated lease on its building — which features a statue of Athena, goddess of wisdom, on its front balcony — would cost an additional £35 million.

In December 2025, it was reported that Limb had made inaccurate claims about her academic qualifications. An earlier version of her curriculum vitae and public biographies had listed a PhD from the University of Liverpool and an MA with Distinction from the Institute of Linguists, and she was frequently referred to as “Dr Ann Limb” in official documents and public appearances. However, subsequent media investigations found that she had not completed a doctoral degree and that the Institute of Linguists does not award MA degrees. Limb publicly acknowledged that she undertook but did not complete a PhD at the University of Liverpool and that her use of the title “Dr” was based on honorary doctorates she had received, rather than on an earned doctoral qualification. As a result, her online CV was updated to remove the unattained PhD and the “Dr” honorific. The revelations prompted political criticism and calls for scrutiny of her recent nomination to the House of Lords.

In January 2026, it was reported that an organisation led by Limb – City & Guilds of London Institute – was being investigated by the Charity Commission for England and Wales regarding bonuses awarded to executives.

== Personal life ==
Having entered into a civil partnership on 21 December 2006, Limb married her partner Dr Margaret Cook, with whom she has shared her life since 1991, on 11 May 2019 and lives with her in Milton Keynes, Buckinghamshire.
