= David Hart (trade unionist) =

David Michael Hart (27 August 1940 – 13 March 2013) was an English trade union leader and solicitor.

Hart was educated at Hurstpierpoint College in West Sussex, and in 1963 qualified as a solicitor. Soon after, he took on the account of the National Association of Head Teachers (NAHT). In 1978, he was selected by the union as its general secretary, despite having no teaching experience. In the role, he became known for his high profile in the media, and for using his legal background to defend members. Under his leadership, union membership increased from 17,000 to more than 30,000, in part due to admitting deputy headteachers.

In 2005, Hart strongly supported a government initiative to allow teachers to spend 10% of their time to planning and assessment, but the majority of members opposed the scheme. Hart decided to retire, and his favoured successor, David Hawker, was easily defeated by Mick Brookes. In retirement, Hart lived in Hesket Newmarket in Cumbria, where he devoted his time to riding and eventing. He was knighted in 2006.

Trade union offices
Preceded by Robert Cook	General Secretary of the National Association of Head Teachers; 1978–2005	Succeeded by Mick Brookes
