= Natural cycle in vitro fertilization =

Natural Cycle In Vitro Fertilization (IVF) is an assisted reproductive technique designed to closely mimic a woman's natural menstrual cycle. In traditional IVF, a woman's ovaries are stimulated with fertility medications to produce multiple eggs, which are then retrieved and fertilized outside the body. A natural cycle IVF, on the other hand, works with the woman's natural hormonal fluctuations and ovulation cycle.

Natural Cycle IVF is in vitro fertilisation (IVF) using either of the following procedures:

- IVF without the use any ovarian hyperstimulation drugs.
- IVF using an ovarian hyperstimulation protocol with a GnRH antagonist for ovulation suppression, generally with gonadotropins as well. This procedure can be called modified natural cycle-IVF (MNC-IVF).
- Frozen embryo transfer; IVF using ovarian hyperstimulation, followed by embryo cryopreservation, followed by embryo transfer in a later, natural, cycle.

== History ==
The first baby conceived through this method of IVF was Louise Brown, the world's first 'test-tube baby.' However, as the field of infertility medicine progressed the protocol drifted away from this method and began incorporating the use of fertility drugs to promote greater production of eggs during one cycle. The idea behind this was to increase the number of eggs a woman can produce per cycle, thus increasing their chance of producing an embryo that will result in a live birth. However, as this protocol to use more and more infertility drugs became the conventional IVF that we know today, many physicians began seeing the risks associated with conventional IVF. Dr. Osamu Kato, the founder of the Kato Ladies Clinic, spearheaded the movement to begin a more natural and mild protocols for IVF.

== No hyperstimulation drugs ==
With no hyperstimulation drugs, the treatment cycle relies on the spontaneous development of one follicle only and therefore the aspiration of only one egg from the follicle (it is possible however that the cycle can have more than one egg or no eggs). GnRH antagonists may still be given for ovulation suppression. In addition the patient will need to take hCG (as with other less invasive treatments such as ovulation monitoring and intrauterine insemination) to time egg collection as well as progesterone pessaries to supplement the body's progesterone levels. Progesterone aids implantation and supports pregnancy in its early stages.

It can be suitable for women who want to avoid ovarian stimulation or fertility drugs as a matter of choice, and for those for whom there may be no other choice, such as women at risk of hormone-related cancers. There is no suppression of the ovaries and associated menopausal symptoms and the treatment cycle is completed within a woman's own menstrual cycle.

=== Advantages ===
There are no side-effects such as ovarian hyperstimulation syndrome (OHSS), bloating, mood changes or other concerns relating to ovarian stimulation. Due to the effect of ovarian stimulation drugs on the body, patients undergoing stimulation cannot pursue consecutive cycles of treatment and need to take 2–3 months break between treatment cycles. In contrast, natural cycle patients can repeat their treatment in consecutive cycles. As only one embryo is transferred in a natural cycle, there is virtually no risk of a multiple pregnancy. Furthermore, ovarian stimulation drugs are expensive and this means that the cost of each cycle is significantly less.

=== Drawbacks ===
The success rate per cycle is low compared to stimulated IVF. HFEA has estimated the live birth rate to be approximately 1.3% per IVF cycle using no hyperstimulation drugs for women aged between 40–42. There is also a small risk of spontaneous ovulation before egg collection. As a consequence, there is a need for a much larger number of cycles before achieving a live birth on average, in turn resulting in an average cost per live birth that is larger than with conventional IVF.

Natural cycle IVF is not suitable for those who do not ovulate spontaneously.

== Mild IVF ==
Mild IVF, sometimes called Soft IVF or IVF Lite, is aimed at producing 2-7 eggs. It does not involve shutting down the hormones for 2 weeks. It is conducted in the woman's natural menstrual cycle. Smaller dosages of stimulating drugs are given for a shorter period to help ripen the 2-7 eggs. Spontaneous ovulation is blocked with injections so that eggs could be collected. Some authors claim that it is safer, less expensive and avoids side-effects associated with suppression of hormones in a conventional IVF cycle. Others question the claim of economic superiority of mild IVF. One study, after comparing mild IVF and conventional IVF in good-prognosis patients, concluded that there was no cost difference between the two protocols on the basis of a "take home baby." Mild IVF reduces the risk of Ovarian Hyperstimulation Syndrome (OHSS).

== Definitions ==
Terminology	Aim	Methodology
Natural cycle IVF	Single oocyte	No medication
Modified Natural cycle IVF	Single oocyte	hCG only Antagonist & FSH add-back
Mild stimulation IVF	2-7 oocytes	Low dose FSH, oral compounds & antagonist/agonist
Conventional IVF	≥8 oocytes	Downregulation weak agonist
