= Katie Martin, Baroness Martin of Brockley =

British political aide

The Right Honourable The Baroness Martin of Brockley
- Official portrait, 2026

Member of the House of Lords
- Lord Temporal
- Life peerage 20 January 2026

Personal details
- Party: Labour

Katherine Lucy Martin, Baroness Martin of Brockley is a British political aide.

== Career ==
Martin was chief of staff to Chancellor of the Exchequer Rachel Reeves. She was previously director of public affairs for Citizens Advice. She was also head of philanthropic partnerships at The Guardian and managing director of the company Ideas42. She was nominated for a life peerage as part of the 2025 Political Peerages to sit in the House of Lords as a Labour peer, and was created Baroness Martin of Brockley, of Ladywell in the London Borough of Lewisham on 20 January 2026.
