= Russell Hobby, Baron Hobby =

British education executive, trade union official and life peer

The Right Honourable The Lord Hobby

Member of the House of Lords
- Lord Temporal
- Life peerage 30 January 2026

Personal details
- Party: Labour (until 2026); Non-affiliated (2026–present)
- Website: https://russellhobby.com/

Russell Keith Hobby, Baron Hobby CBE (born 22 January 1972) is the CEO of The Kemnal Academies Trust (TKAT). Russell was previously the CEO of Teach First from 2017–2025.

== Early life ==
He was born in Abingdon-on-Thames in Oxfordshire. His father was a plasma physicist for the United Kingdom Atomic Energy Authority. His mother was a qualified primary school teacher. He attended a comprehensive school, the John Mason School. He went to Corpus Christi College, Oxford to study PPE, leaving in 1993.

== Career ==
He became General Secretary of NAHT in September 2010. He was re-elected General Secretary in January 2015. In May 2017, he was appointed CEO of Teach First.

Russell replaced Dr Karen Roberts, as CEO of TKAT in September 2025.

Hobby was appointed Commander of the Order of the British Empire (CBE) in the 2022 New Year Honours for services to education. Hobby was nominated for a life peerage as part of the 2025 Political Peerages to sit in the House of Lords; he was created as Baron Hobby, of Belmont in the London Borough of Sutton on 30 January 2026. Although announced as a Labour peer, he was officially listed as a non-affiliated peer after the creation of his peerage.

Trade union offices
| Preceded by Mick Brookes | General Secretary of the NAHT; 2010–2017 | Succeeded by Paul Whiteman |
