= David Ananda Hart =

British theologian (1954–2024)

David Ananda Hart (1954 – 1 March 2024) was a British radical theologian, Anglican priest and a practising Hindu.

== Early life ==
Educated at Keble College, Oxford, and Union Theological Seminary in the City of New York, Hart gained a doctorate in the Philosophy of Religion from the University of Derby.

== Career ==
From 1979 to 1984, Hart taught at Gresham's School in Norfolk. While there, he was ordained as a priest of the Church of England and became the assistant school chaplain.

Appointed next as an Anglican chaplain at Loughborough University, remaining into the 1990s, Hart attended the second Sea of Faith conference and became a prominent member of a group of non-realist theologians inspired by the work of Don Cupitt. In 2006, Hart was the subject of some controversy after newspapers in India and England reported that he had converted to Hinduism, changing his middle name from Alan to Ananda, but without renouncing Christianity or his priestly orders. Hart was India Secretary of the World Congress of Faiths. He was also a Fellow of the Jesus Seminar (USA) and Samvada (India). His proposed book 'An Introduction to Hinduism' (London: Continuum 2009; Series Editor: Clinton Bennett) was intended to examine the breadth of the Hindu faith as he discovered it living in India and show how he regards his position as a Hindu believer as entirely compatible with being an Anglican priest in good standing with his diocesan bishop back in England.

In September 2014 David Ananda returned to his home in South India to take up a position as Consultant and Teacher for the Venad Education and Social Services, a registered NGO in India providing educational opportunities for the children of the marginalised Christian fishing communities in five centres in Kerala and one in Sri Lanka. He was also finalising his eighth book 'Study in Hinduism' which was due out early in 2015.

Hart died in Sri Lanka on 1 March 2024, at the age of 69.

== Publications ==
- Faith in Doubt: Non-Realism and Christian Belief (Mowbray 1993)
- One Faith? Non-Realism and the World of Faiths (Mowbray 1995)
- Linking Up: Christianity and Sexuality (Arthur James 1997)
- (co-editor) Time and Tide: Sea of Faith Beyond the Millennium (O Books 2001)
- Multi-Faith Britain: An Experiment in Worship (O Books 2002)
- Trading Faith: Global Religion in an Age of Rapid Change (O Books 2007)
- The Unification of World Faith: the Challenge of Sun Myung Moon (Om Books 2007)
- Study in Hinduism (Om Books 2015 forthcoming)

"The Wide Gulf in the Gulf: the Religious Origins of the War in the Levant" (co-authored with His Grace Mar Aprem, Head of Church of the East"
