= Carol Linforth, Baroness Linforth =

British political aide

The Right Honourable The Baroness Linforth OBE
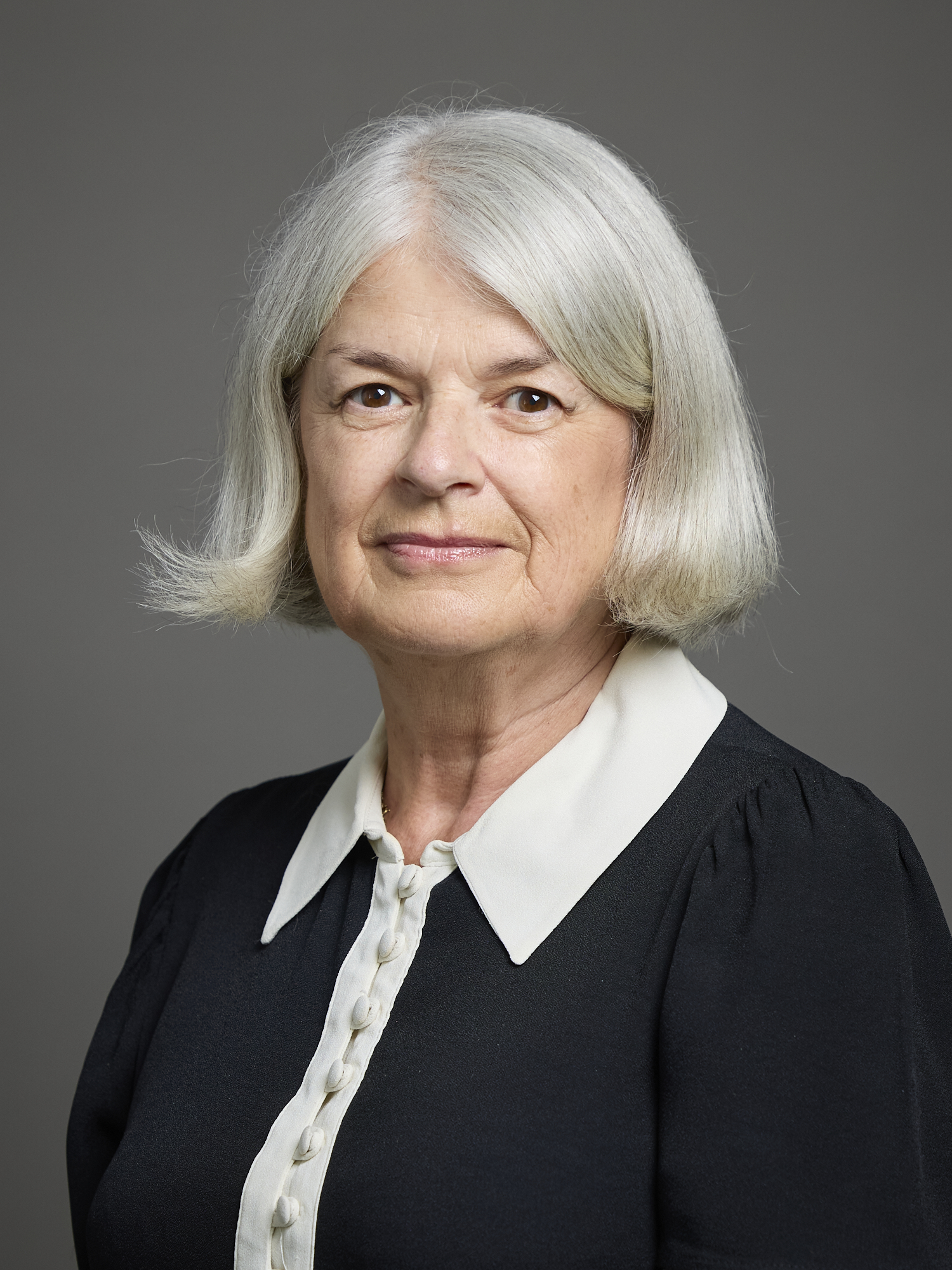
- Official portrait, 2026

Member of the House of Lords
- Lord Temporal
- Life peerage 14 January 2026

Personal details
- Party: Labour

Carol Laurette Linforth, Baroness Linforth OBE is a British political aide.

== Career ==
Linforth is a former Labour Party chief of staff. She served as the party's director of events since 2005. She was given a life peerage as part of the 2025 Political Peerages to sit in the House of Lords as a Labour peer; she was created as Baroness Linforth, of Redland in the City of Bristol on 14 January 2026.
