= Sophy Antrobus, Baroness Antrobus =

British historian and life peer

The Right Honourable The Baroness Antrobus MBE
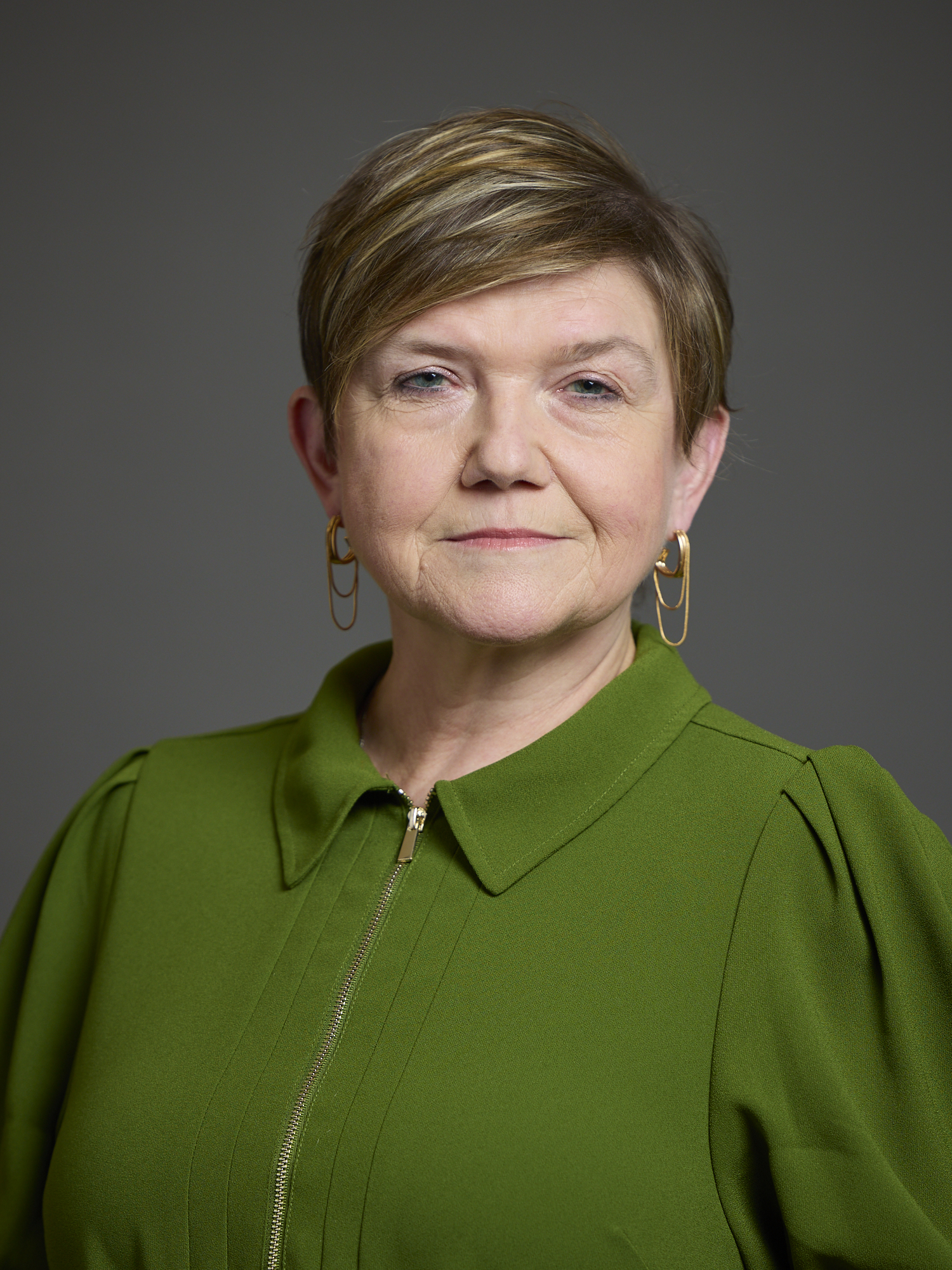
- Official portrait, 2026

Member of the House of Lords
- Lord Temporal
- Life peerage 28 January 2026

Personal details
- Party: Labour
- Education: Kingston Grammar School, University of Cambridge

Sophy Antrobus, Baroness Antrobus (previously Gardner) MBE is a British historian, academic and retired military officer.

== Life and career ==
Privately educated at Putney High School and then Kingston Grammar School, Antrobus is a retired wing commander in the Royal Air Force. Under the previous name Sophy Gardner she was the Labour parliamentary candidate for Gloucester in the 2015 United Kingdom general election.

She was a Senior Research Fellow and co-director of the Freeman Air and Space Institute (FASI) at King's College London, a role she began in 2020. She was nominated for a Labour life peerage as part of the 2025 Political Peerages; she was created as Baroness Antrobus, of Old Sarum in the County of Wiltshire on 28 January 2026.

On 21 July 2026, she was appointed to the Burnham ministry as a Baroness in Waiting. As a result of this, she stood down from leadership of FASI in favour of Julia Balm.
