= All-women shortlist =

Affirmative action practice in the United Kingdom

All-women shortlists (AWS) is an affirmative action practice intended to increase the proportion of female Members of Parliament (MPs) in the United Kingdom, allowing only women to stand in particular constituencies for a particular political party. Labour abandoned the shortlist for general election purposes in March 2022. Political parties in other countries, such as South Korea and various Latin American countries, have used practices analogous to AWS, especially in relation to government sex quotas.

== United Kingdom ==
=== Background ===
In the 1990s, women constituted less than 10% of MPs in the House of Commons of the UK Parliament. Political parties used various strategies to increase female representation, including encouraging women to stand and constituency associations to select them, and providing special training for potential female candidates. Another strategy, the creation of all-women shortlists, is a positive discrimination strategy making it compulsory for selection of women candidates in some constituencies.

For the 1992 general election, the Labour Party had a policy of ensuring there was at least one statutory female candidate on each of its shortlists, however few of these women were successful in being selected in winnable seats (seats within a 6% swing). Following polling that suggested women were less likely to vote Labour than men, the party introduced All-women shortlists at their 1993 annual conference.

In 2016, the Liberal Democrats introduced all-women shortlists for the first time, using them on a limited basis in some of the party's most winnable constituencies.

=== 1997 general election ===
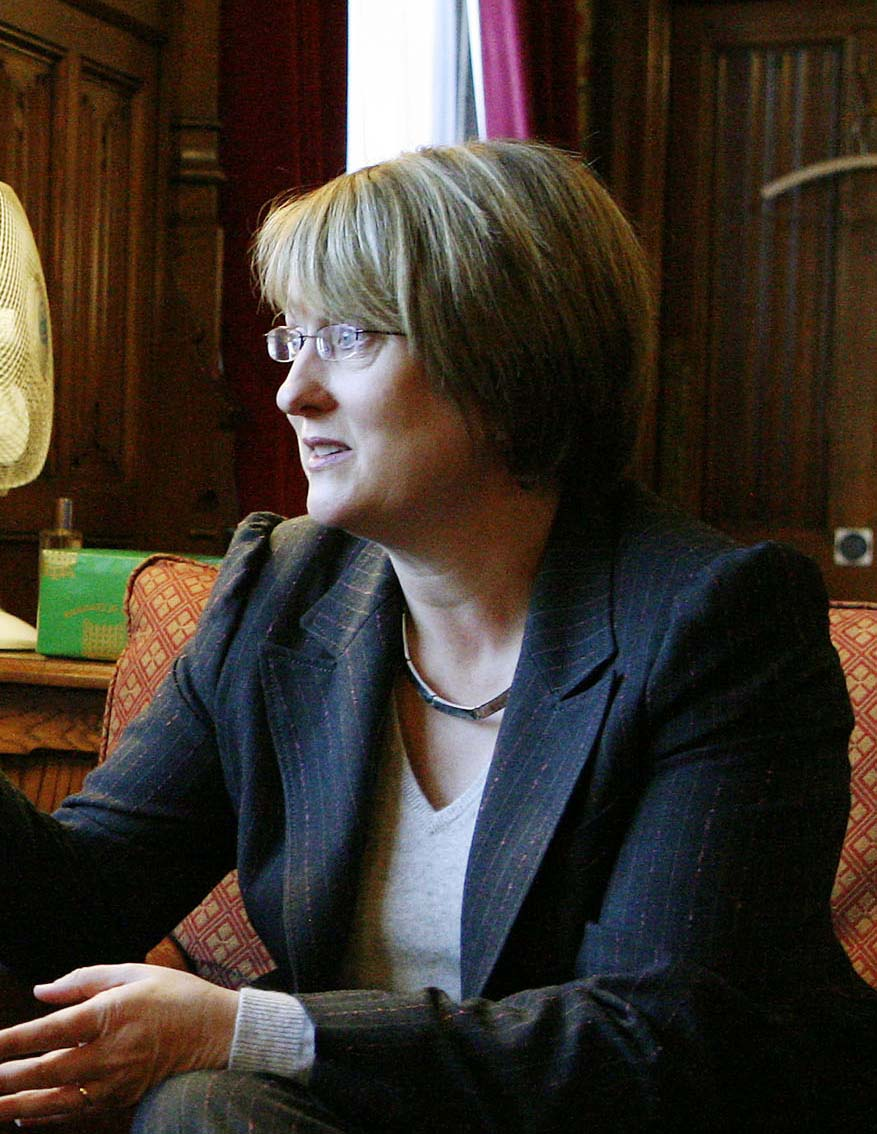
Jacqui Smith, the first female UK Home Secretary, was elected using an AWS.

Labour used all-women shortlists to select candidates in half of all winnable seats for the 1997 general election, with the aim of reaching 100 female MPs post-election; a goal that was achieved. The shortlists provoked controversy, however. In 1996, Labour Party branches in Croydon Central, Merthyr Tydfil & Rhymney, Bishop Auckland and Slough all submitted hostile motions criticising the policy.

Concern about such sex discrimination was especially strong in Slough where the local party refused to even co-operate in selecting a candidate after having an AWS imposed. Then-Labour Party leader Tony Blair stated that AWS were "not ideal at all" in 1995.

In December 1995, Peter Jepson and Roger Dyas-Elliott, prevented from standing on Labour shortlists because of their gender, challenged the policy in court. Supported by the Equal Opportunities Commission, they claimed that they had been illegally barred from applying to be considered to represent the party and that the policy contradicted Labour's policy of aiming to promote equality of opportunity. In January 1996, an industrial tribunal found the Labour Party had broken the law, unanimously ruling that all-women shortlists were illegal under the Sex Discrimination Act 1975 in preventing men from entering a profession.

The 34 candidates who had already been selected by all-women shortlists were not required to seek re-selection, but all 14 unfinished all-women shortlist selections were suspended. Jepson and Dyas-Elliott did not seek compensation for their loss. At the 1997 general election, 35 out of 38 Labour AWS candidates were elected.

The Conservative Party also opposed gender quotas, preferring to persuade constituencies to select female candidates in winnable seats whilst placing no obligation upon them to do so.

Prior to the 1999 European parliament elections, the Liberal Democrats used a system called "zipping" in which equal numbers of men and women were elected as MEPs.

=== 2005 general election ===
Following the reduction in female MPs after the 2001 general election and increased lobbying by gender equality advocates, Labour introduced the Sex Discrimination (Election Candidates) Act 2002, which allows parties to use positive discrimination in the selection of candidates. They were to remain legalised until the end of 2015, due to a "sunset clause" in the Act, but that deadline was extended to 2030 as part of the Equality Act 2010.

In contrast, the Liberal Democrats rejected a proposal to use AWS in 2001; suggesting such shortlists were illiberal and unnecessary. Prominent women MPs of the party opposed the use of all-women shortlists. Party members argued that the main problem was not discrimination, but a lack of female candidates. Instead the party set a target of having 40% female candidates in winnable seats.

At the 2005 general election, the shortlists helped to increase the number of female MPs in Parliament to 128, with the Labour Party's 98 women constituting 77% of the total. However, a Labour-controlled "safe seat" was lost when explicitly anti-AWS independent candidate Peter Law won the Blaenau Gwent constituency in Wales beating Maggie Jones who had been selected using Labour's All-women shortlist policy. The loss was widely blamed on controversy over AWS, with some opponents suspecting that AWS were being used as a device to keep out men who might have made trouble for the Prime Minister.

=== 2010 general election ===
A Speaker's conference was set up in 2008 to study the reasons why MPs were predominantly white, male and able-bodied. An interim report released in July 2009 called for women to make up at least 50% of new candidates at the following general election. However, all-women shortlists continued to elicit criticism. Then-Conservative Ann Widdecombe criticised the use of AWS stating that women in the past who fought for equality such as the suffragettes "wanted equal opportunities not special privileges" and "they would have thrown themselves under the King's horse to protest against positive discrimination and all-women shortlists".

Diane Abbott, one of the early supporters of all-women shortlists criticised their failure to recruit ethnic minority women into politics, stating that they had in effect "been all white women shortlists" As evidence of this claim, she cited the 1997 Parliamentary intake; where none of the MPs selected using all-women shortlists were black. Conservative Party leader David Cameron tried to institute AWS in 2006. There was opposition from some female Conservative MPs, such as Nadine Dorries and Ann Widdecombe.

In October 2009, David Cameron stated that the under-representation of women and ethnic minorities was "a real problem for Parliament and for my party", and reversed his opposition to AWS. In February 2010, he indicated that he would impose AWS because the pace of change towards the selection of more female MPs had been too slow. In 2009, Liberal Democrat leader Nick Clegg stated that he would consider introducing all-women shortlists if the number of female MPs did not increase following the next election, but he did not see this as a long-term solution for the unrepresentative nature of parliament.

=== 2015 general election ===
The Conservative Party used AWS for selection of a few candidates in the 2015 general election. Helen Whately was selected in Faversham and Mid Kent.

In March 2015, the Scottish National Party permitted all-women shortlists where an incumbent elected representative announced their intention to stand down.

=== 2017 general election ===
At the 2017 election, a "record number of female MPs" entered Parliament, although the gender balance was highly skewed between parties. In Labour, 45% of MPs were women, in the Scottish National Party 34%, in the Liberal Democrats 33%, but in the Conservatives just 21%. This meant the House of Commons was 32% women overall.

=== 2019 general election ===
The record for the number of female MPs elected was broken at the 2019 general election, which marked the first time that women made up more than one-third of the House of Commons. It saw an increase in the proportion of women elected from both the Conservative and Labour parties. Although 51% of Labour MPs were women after the election, the lack of any stop mechanism in the party's rules meant preferential all-women shortlists could continue to be used until the statutory exception expires in 2030. The election also returned the largest number of female Conservative MPs in the party's history, without the use of all-women shortlists.

The Liberal Democrats had the highest proportion of female MPs of any party represented in the House of Commons. The party used an all-women shortlist in Twickenham to select a successor to the retiring Vince Cable. Munira Wilson won the selection and was elected as the constituency's MP at the general election. The Scottish National Party also increased the number of women in its parliamentary group.

Percentage of women MPs by party
Party	2010	2015	2017	2019
House of Commons	22%	29%	32%	34%
Labour	31%	43%	45%	51%
Conservative	16%	21%	21%	24%
Scottish National Party	17%	36%	34%	33%
Liberal Democrat	12%	0%	33%	64%

=== Impact ===
All-women shortlists had been credited with breaking down prejudices that impeded the selection of women and discouraged women from offering their candidacy. In both 1997 and 2005, 50% of women MPs elected were selected from all-women shortlists.

The increase in women in politics brought increased parliamentary priority to issues such as women's health, domestic violence against women, and childcare. In addition, the increased number of women MPs and greater focus on women's concerns likely resulted in increased female support for Labour at the polls. AWS may also have made it easier for women to be selected for non-all-women shortlist seats. The shortlists also gave rise to the appointment of the first British female Home Secretary, Jacqui Smith in June 2007.

After Labour was warned that continuing with all-women shortlists for parliamentary elections would become an "unlawful" practice again under the Equality Act (because the majority of their MPs are female), HuffPost reported that the party abandoned them in March 2022.

== Other countries ==
Many countries today use political gender quotas.

=== Scandinavia ===
Among the first to use party reservations for female candidates by political parties were Norway, Sweden and Denmark. In 1983, the Norwegian Labour Party mandated that "at all elections and nominations both sexes must be represented by at least 40 per cent", and in 1994, the Swedish Social Democratic Workers' Party mandated "every second on the list a woman", which meant that male and female candidates would be alternated between each other on the party list of preferred candidates, a format known as a "zipper quota". The quota was imposed on 290 local parties by the national party organization. Furthermore, the party created a handbook for women with advice about how to seek political office. In 1988, the Danish Social Democrats "each sex has the right to a representation of at least 40 per cent of the Social Democratic candidates for local and regional elections. If there is not a sufficient number of candidates from each sex, this right will not fully come into effect"; however, this party law was abolished in 1996.

=== Iraq ===
Iraq held its first post-Saddam parliamentary elections in January 2005 under an electoral law providing for compulsory integration of women on the candidate lists, like several European countries with a proportional electoral system.

=== Latin America ===
Latin American political parties' gender policies for candidates often have a relationship to their respective countries' legalized gender quotas for governing bodies. Fourteen Latin American countries have such a quota for their legislatures; these countries consist of Argentina, Bolivia, Brazil, Colombia, Costa Rica, Dominican Republic, Ecuador, Guyana, Honduras, Mexico, Panama, Paraguay, Peru, and Uruguay. Political parties in Latin American countries utilize a variety of systems to pick their candidates for office, with Argentina, Chile, and Uruguay having "fairly informal selection rules" for their candidates, in which party elites have large amounts of influence, while those in Paraguay and Costa Rica use more stringent methods of selection described by formal and written rules within the political parties. Political parties with more bureaucratized, stricter candidate selection processes in Latin American countries with legislative-body quotas run women as, on average, 37.8% of their candidates for legislative bodies, while in those parties with less formalized selection processes, on average, women constitute 31.5% of candidates.

=== South Korea ===
South Korea has a system in which gender quotas exist for its single national legislative body, the National Assembly, with a requirement that women hold 30% of the National Assembly's 246 single-member constituency seats and 50% of its 54 proportionally elected seats. However, "neither of the two major political parties has thus far nominated women to more than 10 percent of the single-member district seats," resulting in women constituting 15.7% of National Assembly members. This situation is largely due to the candidate selection process of South Korean political parties, whose "rules governing candidate selection lack routinization," allowing party leaders to have significant influence regarding candidates and the ability to circumvent gender quotas.

=== Canada ===
The Liberal Party and the NDP at both federal and provincial levels started to set targets to increase the number and percentage of female candidates in the 1990s and used informal and internal mechanisms toward that goal.

In 2020, the Ontario Liberal Party under the leadership of Steven Del Duca became the first political party in Canada to formally institute "Women-only Nomination" in its nomination rules. The party has, while in government under premiers Dalton McGuinty and Kathleen Wynne, informally and effectively caused a limited number of contests to feature only female contestants. The new measure explicitly allowed the party to designate certain electoral districts where only female nomination contestants would be included on the nomination ballots. Del Duca further mandated party officials to prioritize designating "target ridings", namely districts with retiring incumbent and where it previously held while in government, as women-only. However, the party's dismal performance in the 2022 election meant that only one of the 22 candidates nominated under this new measure (Stephanie Bowman in Don Valley West, where former premier Wynne was retiring) became an elected MPP.

== Criticisms ==
All-women shortlists have been criticised as undemocratic, as "bypassing competitive principles and hence as ignoring the merit principle," and as "a form of discrimination against men." Labour's policy of all-women shortlists was challenged successfully in court in 1996, when an industrial tribunal found the Labour Party had broken the law, unanimously ruling that all-women shortlists were illegal under the Sex Discrimination Act 1975 in preventing men from entering a profession.

One category of criticism asserts that gender quotas represent a positive step, but do not accomplish enough. Some criticism in this vein asserts that quotas should include penalties for groups who do not follow them. Similarly, some critics argue that quotas in corporations in addition to those in governing bodies, should be instituted among other measures to improve public and private sector career opportunities for women.

However, other critics believe that gender quota policies, like those of which all-women shortlists represent a subset, do not, no matter their requirements, provide a way for women to achieve equality in government. For instance, some critics in this arena believe that gender quotas and debate regarding them does not represent real or substantive gains for women. Similarly, some criticisms of gender quotas, including all-women shortlists, argue that even with quotas in place, societal norms discouraging women from holding leadership positions still prevent significant changes. More specifically, these critics assert that even when women do run for office under quota systems, they face a lack of monetary support and as a result often do not win elections.

== See also ==
- Critical mass (gender politics)
- Identity politics
- List of female members of the House of Commons of the United Kingdom
- List of female political office-holders in the United Kingdom
- Parliament (Qualification of Women) Act 1918
- Positive discrimination
- Racial quota
- Reserved political positions
- Timeline of female MPs in the House of Commons
- Widow's succession
- Women in the House of Commons of the United Kingdom
