= List of female members of the Parliament of the United Kingdom =

This is a list of women who have been elected as members of Parliament (MPs) to the House of Commons of the United Kingdom.

== 1918 to 1935 ==
Party	Name	Constituency	Start	End	Reason
Sinn Féin	Constance Markievicz	Dublin St Patrick's	1918 (Note: Did not take seat.)	1922	Constituency abolished due to establishment of Irish Free State
Conservative	Nancy Astor	Plymouth Sutton	1919	1945	Retired
Liberal	Margaret Wintringham	Louth, Lincolnshire	1921	1924	Defeated
Conservative	Mabel Philipson	Berwick-upon-Tweed	1923	1929	Retired
Labour	Margaret Bondfield	Northampton	1923	1924	Defeated
Labour	Margaret Bondfield	Wallsend	1926	1931	Defeated
Labour	Dorothy Jewson	Norwich	1923	1924	Defeated
Labour	Susan Lawrence	East Ham North	1923	1924	Defeated
Labour	Susan Lawrence	East Ham North	1926	1931	Defeated
Unionist	Katharine Stewart-Murray	Kinross and Western Perthshire	1923	1938	Resigned
Liberal	Vera Woodhouse	Wycombe	1923	1924	Defeated
Labour	Ellen Wilkinson	Middlesbrough East	1924	1931	Defeated
Labour	Ellen Wilkinson	Jarrow	1935	1947	Died
Conservative	Gwendolen Guinness	Southend	1927	1935	Retired
Labour	Ruth Dalton	Bishop Auckland	1929	1929	Retired
Liberal	Hilda Runciman	St Ives	1928	1929	Defeated in Tavistock
Labour	Ethel Bentham	Islington East	1929	1931	Died
Labour	Mary Hamilton	Blackburn	1929	1931	Defeated
Ind. Labour	Jennie Lee (Note: Also served as a Member of the House of Lords.)	North Lanarkshire	1929	1931	Defeated
Labour	Jennie Lee	Cannock	1945	1970	Defeated
Liberal	Megan Lloyd George	Anglesey	1929	1931	Re-elected as an opposition Liberal
Ind. Liberal	Megan Lloyd George	Anglesey	1931	1935	Independent and official Liberals reunited
Liberal	Megan Lloyd George	Anglesey	1935	1951	Defeated
Labour	Megan Lloyd George	Carmarthen	1957	1966	Died
Labour	Cynthia Mosley	Stoke-on-Trent	1929	1931	Left Labour Party, joined the New Party
New Party	Cynthia Mosley	Stoke-on-Trent	1931	1931	Retired
Labour	Marion Phillips	Sunderland	1929	1931	Defeated
Labour	Edith Picton-Turbervill	The Wrekin	1929	1931	Defeated
Independent	Eleanor Rathbone	Combined English Universities	1929	1946	Died
Labour	Lucy Noel-Buxton	North Norfolk	1930	1931	Defeated
Labour	Lucy Noel-Buxton	Norwich	1945	1950	Retired
Labour	Leah Manning	Islington East	1931	1931	Defeated
Labour	Leah Manning	Epping	1945	1950	Defeated
Unionist	Helen Brown-Shaw	Bothwell	1931	1935	Defeated
Conservative	Thelma Cazalet-Keir	Islington East	1931	1945	Defeated
Conservative	Ida Copeland	Stoke-on-Trent	1931	1935	Defeated
Conservative	Marjorie Graves	Hackney South	1931	1935	Defeated
Unionist	Florence Horsbrugh	Dundee	1931	1945	Defeated
Conservative	Florence Horsbrugh	Manchester Moss Side	1950	1959	Retired
Conservative	Mary Pickford	Hammersmith North	1931	1934	Died
Conservative	Norah Runge	Rotherhithe	1931	1935	Defeated
Conservative	Mavis Tate	Willesden West (1931–1935); Frome (1935–1945)	1931	1945	Retired
Conservative	Sarah Ward	Cannock	1931	1935	Defeated
Conservative	Irene Ward	Wallsend	1931	1945	Defeated
Conservative	Irene Ward	Tynemouth	1950	1974	Retired

== 1935 to 1950 ==
Party	Name	Constituency	Start	End	Reason
Conservative	Frances Davidson	Hemel Hempstead	1937	1959	Retired
Labour	Agnes Hardie	Glasgow Springburn	1937	1945	Retired
Labour	Edith Summerskill	Fulham West (1938–1955); Warrington (1955–1961)	1938	1961	Resigned
Labour	Janet Adamson	Dartford (1938–1945); Bexley (1945–1946)	1938	1946	Resigned
Conservative	Beatrice Wright	Bodmin	1941	1945	Retired
Conservative	Violet Bathurst	Bristol Central	1943	1945	Defeated
Labour	Barbara Ayrton-Gould	Hendon North	1945	1950	Defeated
Labour	Alice Bacon	Leeds North East (1945–1955); Leeds South East (1955–1970)	1945	1970	Retired
Labour	Bessie Braddock	Liverpool Exchange	1945	1970	Retired
Labour	Barbara Castle (Note: Also served as a Member of the European Parliament (MEP).)	Blackburn East (1950–1955); Blackburn (1955–1979)	1945	1979	Retired
Labour	Grace Colman	Tynemouth	1945	1950	Defeated
Labour	Freda Corbet	Camberwell North West (1945–1950); Peckham (1950–1974)	1945	1974 (Feb)	Retired
Labour Co-op	Caroline Ganley	Battersea South	1945	1951	Defeated
Labour	Margaret Herbison	North Lanarkshire	1945	1970	Retired
Labour	Jean Mann	Coatbridge (1945–1950); Coatbridge and Airdrie (1950–1959)	1945	1959	Retired
Labour	Lucy Middleton	Plymouth Sutton	1945	1951	Defeated
Labour	Muriel Nichol	Bradford North	1945	1950	Defeated
Labour	Florence Paton	Rushcliffe	1945	1950	Defeated
Labour Co-op	Mabel Ridealgh	Ilford North	1945	1950	Defeated
Labour	Clarice Shaw	Kilmarnock	1945	1946	Resigned
Labour Co-op	Edith Wills	Birmingham Duddeston	1945	1950	Defeated
Unionist	Priscilla Buchan	Aberdeen South	1946	1966	Defeated
Conservative	Priscilla Buchan	Aberdeen South	1946	1966	Defeated
Labour	Alice Cullen	Glasgow Gorbals	1948	1969	Died

== 1950 to 1965 ==
Party	Name	Constituency	Start	End	Reason
Labour	Elaine Burton	Coventry South	1950	1959	Defeated
Conservative	Eveline Hill	Manchester Wythenshawe	1950	1964	Defeated
Conservative	Patricia Hornsby-Smith	Chislehurst	1950	1966	Defeated
Conservative	Patricia Hornsby-Smith	Chislehurst	1970	1974 (Feb)	Defeated in Aldridge-Brownhills
Labour	Dorothy Rees	Barry	1950	1951	Defeated
Labour	Eirene White	East Flintshire	1950	1970	Retired
Labour Co-op	Harriet Slater	Stoke-on-Trent North	1953	1966	Retired
UUP	Patricia Ford	North Down	1953	1955	Retired
Conservative	Edith Pitt	Birmingham Edgbaston	1953	1966	Died
Labour	Lena Jeger	Holborn and St Pancras South	1953	1959	Defeated
Labour	Lena Jeger	Holborn and St Pancras South	1964	1979	Retired
Labour Co-op	Joyce Butler	Wood Green	1955	1979	Retired
Conservative	Evelyn Emmet	East Grinstead	1955	1965	Resigned
UUP	Patricia McLaughlin	Belfast West	1955	1964	Retired
National Liberal	Joan Vickers	Plymouth Devonport	1955	1968	National Liberal Party disbanded, joined the Conservative Party
Conservative	Joan Vickers	Plymouth Devonport	1968	1974 (Feb)	Defeated
Conservative	Mervyn Parnicott-Pike	Melton	1956	1974 (Feb)	Retired
Conservative	Muriel Gammans	Hornsey	1957	1966	Retired
Labour	Mary McAlister	Glasgow Kelvingrove	1958	1959	Defeated
Unionist	Betty Harvie-Anderson	East Renfrewshire	1959	1979	Retired
Conservative	Betty Harvie-Anderson	East Renfrewshire	1959	1979	Retired
Labour	Judith Hart	Lanark (1959–1983); Clydesdale (1983–1987)	1959	1987	Retired
Conservative	Margaret Thatcher	Finchley	1959	1992	Retired
Conservative	Joan Quennell	Petersfield	1960	1974 (Oct)	Retired
Labour	Anne Kerr	Rochester and Chatham	1964	1970	Defeated
Labour	Margaret McKay	Clapham	1964	1970	Retired
Labour	Renée Short	Wolverhampton North East	1964	1987	Retired
Labour	Shirley Summerskill	Halifax	1964	1983	Defeated
Labour	Shirley Williams	Hitchin (1964–1974); Hertford and Stevenage (1974–1979)	1964	1979	Defeated
SDP	Shirley Williams	Crosby	1981	1983	Defeated

== 1965 to 1983 ==
Party	Name	Constituency	Start	End	Reason
Labour	Gwyneth Dunwoody	Exeter	1966	1970	Defeated
Labour	Gwyneth Dunwoody	Crewe (1974–1983); Crewe and Nantwich (1983–2008)	1974 (Feb)	2008	Died
Conservative	Jill Knight	Birmingham Edgbaston	1966	1997	Retired
Labour	Joan Lestor	Eton and Slough	1966	1983	Defeated
Labour	Joan Lestor	Eccles	1987	1997	Retired
SNP	Winnie Ewing (Note: Also served as a Member of the Scottish Parliament (MSP).)	Hamilton	1967	1970	Defeated
SNP	Winnie Ewing	Moray and Nairn	1974 (Feb)	1979	Defeated
Unity	Bernadette Devlin McAliskey	Mid Ulster	1969	1970	Sat after re-election as an Independent Socialist
Ind. Socialist	Bernadette Devlin McAliskey	Mid Ulster	1970	1974 (Feb)	Defeated
Conservative	Peggy Fenner	Rochester and Chatham	1970	1974 (Oct)	Defeated
Conservative	Peggy Fenner	Medway	1979	1997	Defeated
Labour	Doris Fisher	Birmingham Ladywood	1970	1974 (Feb)	Retired
Conservative	Janet Fookes	Merton and Morden (1970–1974); Plymouth Drake (1974–1997)	1970	1997	Retired
Conservative	Joan Hall	Keighley	1970	1974 (Feb)	Defeated
Conservative	Mary Holt	Preston North	1970	1974 (Feb)	Defeated
Conservative	Elaine Kellett-Bowman	Lancaster	1970	1997	Retired
Conservative	Constance Monks	Chorley	1970	1974 (Feb)	Defeated
Conservative	Sally Oppenheim-Barnes	Gloucester	1970	1987	Retired
Labour	Betty Boothroyd	West Bromwich (1973–1974); West Bromwich West (1974–2000)	1973	1992	Left Labour Party, elected Speaker
Speaker	Betty Boothroyd	West Bromwich (1973–1974); West Bromwich West (1974–2000)	1992	2000	Resigned
SNP	Margo MacDonald	Glasgow Govan	1973	1974 (Feb)	Defeated
Conservative	Lynda Chalker	Wallasey	1974 (Feb)	1992	Defeated
Labour	Maureen Colquhoun	Northampton North	1974 (Feb)	1979	Defeated
Labour	Jo Richardson	Barking	1974 (Feb)	1994	Died
Labour	Audrey Wise	Coventry South West	1974 (Feb)	1979	Defeated
Labour	Audrey Wise	Preston	1987	2000	Died
Labour	Margaret Beckett	Lincoln	1974 (Oct)	1979	Defeated
Labour	Margaret Beckett	Derby South	1983	2024	Retired
SNP	Margaret Ewing	East Dunbartonshire	1974 (Oct)	1979	Defeated
SNP	Margaret Ewing	Moray	1987	2001	Retired
Labour	Helene Hayman	Welwyn and Hatfield	1974 (Oct)	1979	Defeated
Labour	Joan Maynard	Sheffield Brightside	1974 (Oct)	1987	Retired
Labour	Millie Miller	Ilford North	1974 (Oct)	1977	Died
Labour	Ann Taylor	Bolton West	1974 (Oct)	1983	Defeated
Labour	Ann Taylor	Dewsbury	1987	2005	Retired
Labour	Oonagh McDonald	Thurrock	1976	1987	Defeated
Conservative	Sheila Faith	Belper	1979	1983	Retired
Labour	Sheila Wright	Birmingham Handsworth	1979	1983	Retired
Conservative	Angela Rumbold	Mitcham and Morden	1982	1997	Defeated
Labour	Harriet Harman	Peckham (1982–1997); Camberwell and Peckham (1997–2024)	1982	2024	Retired
Labour	Helen McElhone	Glasgow Queen's Park	1982	1983	Retired

== 1983 to 1997 ==
Party	Name	Constituency	Start	End	Reason
Conservative	Edwina Currie	South Derbyshire	1983	1997	Defeated
Conservative	Anna McCurley	Renfrew West and Inverclyde	1983	1987	Defeated
Conservative	Elizabeth Peacock	Batley and Spen	1983	1997	Defeated
Conservative	Marion Roe	Broxbourne	1983	2005	Retired
Labour	Clare Short	Birmingham Ladywood	1983	2006	Left Labour Party, became an Independent
Independent	Clare Short	Birmingham Ladywood	2006	2010	Retired
Conservative	Ann Winterton	Congleton	1983	2010	Retired
Conservative	Virginia Bottomley	South West Surrey	1984	2005	Retired
Labour	Ann Clwyd	Cynon Valley	1984	2019	Retired
Liberal	Elizabeth Shields	Ryedale	1986	1987	Defeated
Labour	Llin Golding	Newcastle-under-Lyme	1986	2001	Retired
SDP	Rosie Barnes	Greenwich	1987	1988	Joined the Continuing Social Democratic Party
SDP	Rosie Barnes	Greenwich	1988	1990	Continuing SDP disbanded, became an Independent Social Democrat
Ind. Social Democrat	Rosie Barnes	Greenwich	1990	1992	Defeated
Labour	Diane Abbott	Hackney North and Stoke Newington	1987	present	Serving
Labour	Hilary Armstrong	Durham North West	1987	2010	Retired
Labour	Maria Fyfe	Glasgow Maryhill	1987	2001	Retired
Labour	Mildred Gordon	Bow and Poplar	1987	1997	Retired
Conservative	Teresa Gorman	Billericay	1987	2001	Retired
Conservative	Maureen Hicks	Wolverhampton North East	1987	1992	Defeated
Labour	Alice Mahon	Halifax	1987	2005	Retired
Liberal	Ray Michie	Argyll and Bute	1987	2001	Retired
Liberal Democrats	Ray Michie	Argyll and Bute	1987	2001	Retired
Labour	Mo Mowlam	Redcar	1987	2001	Retired
Conservative	Emma Nicholson	Torridge and West Devon	1987	1995	Left Conservative Party, joined Liberal Democrats
Liberal Democrats	Emma Nicholson	Torridge and West Devon	1995	1997	Retired
Labour	Dawn Primarolo	Bristol South	1987	2015	Retired
Labour	Joyce Quin	Gateshead East (1987–1997); Gateshead East and Washington West (1997–2005)	1987	2005	Retired
Labour	Joan Ruddock	Lewisham Deptford	1987	2015	Retired
Conservative	Gillian Shephard	South West Norfolk	1987	2005	Retired
Labour	Joan Walley	Stoke-on-Trent North	1987	2015	Retired
Conservative	Ann Widdecombe	Maidstone (1987–1997); Maidstone and The Weald (1997–2010)	1987	2010	Retired
Labour	Kate Hoey	Vauxhall	1989	2019	Retired
Labour	Sylvia Heal	Mid Staffordshire	1990	1992	Defeated
Labour	Sylvia Heal	Halesowen and Rowley Regis	1997	2010	Retired
Labour	Irene Adams	Paisley North	1990	2005	Retired
Labour	Janet Anderson	Rossendale and Darwen	1992	2010	Defeated
Conservative	Angela Browning	Tiverton (1992–1997); Tiverton and Honiton (1997–2010)	1992	2010	Retired
Labour	Anne Campbell	Cambridge	1992	2005	Defeated
Conservative	Judith Chaplin	Newbury	1992	1993	Died
Labour	Ann Coffey	Stockport	1992	2018	Left Labour Party, joined Change UK
Change UK	Ann Coffey	Stockport	2018	2019	Retired
Labour	Jean Corston	Bristol East	1992	2005	Retired
Labour	Angela Eagle	Wallasey	1992	present	Serving
Conservative	Cheryl Gillan	Chesham and Amersham	1992	2021	Died
Labour	Glenda Jackson	Hampstead and Highgate (1992–2010); Hampstead and Kilburn (2010–2015)	1992	2015	Retired
Labour	Helen Jackson	Sheffield Hillsborough	1992	2005	Retired
Labour	Lynne Jones	Birmingham Selly Oak	1992	2010	Retired
Labour	Tessa Jowell	Dulwich (1992–1997); Dulwich and West Norwood (1997–2015)	1992	2015	Retired
Labour	Jane Kennedy (Note: Also served as a Police and Crime Commissioner (PCC).)	Liverpool Broadgreen (1992–1997); Liverpool Wavertree (1997–2010)	1992	2010	Retired
Conservative	Angela Knight	Erewash	1992	1997	Defeated
Conservative	Jacqui Lait	Hastings and Rye	1992	1997	Defeated
Conservative	Jacqui Lait	Beckenham	1997	2010	Retired
Liberal Democrats	Liz Lynne	Rochdale	1992	1997	Defeated
Conservative	Olga Maitland	Sutton and Cheam	1992	1997	Defeated
Labour	Estelle Morris	Birmingham Yardley	1992	2005	Retired
Labour	Bridget Prentice	Lewisham East	1992	2010	Retired
Labour	Barbara Roche	Hornsey and Wood Green	1992	2005	Defeated
Labour	Rachel Squire	Dunfermline West (1992–2005); Dunfermline and West Fife (2005–2006)	1992	2006	Died
Liberal Democrats	Diana Maddock	Christchurch	1993	1997	Defeated
Labour	Judith Church	Dagenham	1994	2001	Retired
Labour	Margaret Hodge	Barking	1994	2024	Retired
Labour	Helen Liddell	Monklands East (1994–1997); Airdrie and Shotts (1997–2005)	1994	2005	Retired
SNP	Roseanna Cunningham	Perth and Kinross (1995–1997); Perth (1997–2001)	1995	2001	Retired

== 1997 to 2010 ==
Party	Name	Constituency	Start	End	Reason
Labour	Candy Atherton	Falmouth and Camborne	1997	2005	Defeated
Labour	Charlotte Atkins	Staffordshire Moorlands	1997	2010	Defeated
Liberal Democrats	Jackie Ballard	Taunton	1997	2001	Defeated
Labour	Anne Begg	Aberdeen South	1997	2015	Defeated
Labour	Liz Blackman	Erewash	1997	2010	Retired
Labour	Hazel Blears	Salford (1997–2010); Salford and Eccles (2010–2015)	1997	2015	Retired
Labour	Karen Buck	Regent's Park and Kensington North (1997–2010); Westminster North (2010–2024)	1997	2024	Retired
Labour	Christine Butler	Castle Point	1997	2001	Defeated
Labour	Helen Clark	Peterborough	1997	2005	Defeated
Labour	Lynda Clark	Edinburgh Pentlands	1997	2005	Retired
Labour	Yvette Cooper	Pontefract and Castleford (1997–2010); Normanton, Pontefract and Castleford (2010–2024); Pontefract, Castleford and Knottingley (2024–ppresent)	1997	present	Serving
Labour	Ann Cryer	Keighley	1997	2010	Retired
Labour	Claire Curtis-Thomas	Crosby	1997	2010	Retired
Labour	Valerie Davey	Bristol West	1997	2005	Defeated
Labour	Janet Dean	Burton	1997	2010	Retired
Labour	Julia Drown	South Swindon	1997	2005	Retired
Labour	Maria Eagle	Liverpool Garston (1997–2010); Garston and Halewood (2010–2024); Liverpool Garston (2024–present)	1997	present	Serving
Labour	Louise Ellman	Liverpool Riverside	1997	2019	Resigned from Labour, became an Independent
Independent	Louise Ellman	Liverpool Riverside	2019	2019	Retired
Labour	Lorna Fitzsimons	Rochdale	1997	2005	Defeated
Labour	Caroline Flint	Don Valley	1997	2019	Defeated
Labour	Barbara Follett	Stevenage	1997	2010	Retired
Labour Co-op	Linda Gilroy	Plymouth Sutton	1997	2010	Defeated
Labour	Eileen Gordon	Romford	1997	2001	Defeated
Labour	Jane Griffiths	Reading East	1997	2005	Deselected
Labour	Patricia Hewitt	Leicester West	1997	2010	Retired
Labour	Beverley Hughes	Stretford and Urmston	1997	2010	Retired
Labour	Joan Humble	Blackpool North and Fleetwood	1997	2010	Retired
Labour	Melanie Johnson	Welwyn Hatfield	1997	2005	Defeated
Labour	Fiona Jones	Newark	1997	2001	Defeated
Labour	Helen Jones	Warrington North	1997	2019	Retired
Labour	Jenny Jones	Wolverhampton South West	1997	2001	Retired
Labour	Sally Keeble	Northampton North	1997	2010	Defeated
Labour	Ann Keen	Brentford and Isleworth	1997	2010	Defeated
Labour	Ruth Kelly	Bolton West	1997	2010	Retired
Labour	Oona King	Bethnal Green and Bow	1997	2005	Defeated
Labour	Tess Kingham	Gloucester	1997	2001	Retired
Conservative	Julie Kirkbride	Bromsgrove	1997	2010	Retired
Conservative	Eleanor Laing	Epping Forest	1997	2024	Retired
Labour	Jackie Lawrence	Preseli Pembrokeshire	1997	2005	Retired
Labour	Fiona Mactaggart	Slough	1997	2017	Retired
Labour	Judy Mallaber	Amber Valley	1997	2010	Defeated
Conservative	Theresa May	Maidenhead	1997	2024	Retired
Labour	Christine McCafferty	Calder Valley	1997	2010	Retired
Labour	Siobhain McDonagh	Mitcham and Morden	1997	present	Serving
Labour	Anne McGuire	Stirling	1997	2015	Retired
Conservative	Anne McIntosh	Vale of York (1997–2010); Thirsk and Malton (2010–2015)	1997	2015	Deselected
Labour	Shona McIsaac	Cleethorpes	1997	2010	Defeated
Labour	Rosemary McKenna	Cumbernauld and Kilsyth (1997–2005); Cumbernauld, Kilsyth and Kirkintilloch East (2005–2010)	1997	2010	Retired
Labour	Gillian Merron	Lincoln	1997	2010	Defeated
Labour	Laura Moffatt	Crawley	1997	2010	Retired
Labour	Margaret Moran	Luton South	1997	2010	Retired after being barred from standing again for the Labour Party
Labour	Julie Morgan (Note: Also served as a Member of the Senedd (MS) or Assembly Member (AM).)	Cardiff North	1997	2010	Defeated
Labour	Kali Mountford	Colne Valley	1997	2010	Retired
Labour	Diana Organ	Forest of Dean	1997	2005	Retired
Labour	Sandra Osborne	Ayr (1997–2005); Ayr, Carrick and Cumnock (2005–2015)	1997	2015	Defeated
Labour	Linda Perham	Ilford North	1997	2005	Defeated
Labour	Christine Russell	City of Chester	1997	2010	Defeated
Labour	Joan Ryan	Enfield North	1997	2010	Defeated
Labour	Joan Ryan	Enfield North	2015	2018	Left Labour Party and joined Change UK
Change UK	Joan Ryan	Enfield North	2018	2019	Retired
Labour	Debra Shipley	Stourbridge	1997	2005	Retired
Labour Co-op	Angela Smith	Basildon	1997	2010	Defeated in South Basildon and East Thurrock
Labour	Geraldine Smith	Morecambe and Lunesdale	1997	2010	Defeated
Labour	Jacqui Smith	Redditch	1997	2010	Defeated
Labour	Helen Southworth	Warrington South	1997	2010	Retired
Conservative	Caroline Spelman	Meriden	1997	2019	Retired
Labour	Phyllis Starkey	Milton Keynes South West	1997	2010	Defeated in Milton Keynes South
Labour	Gisela Stuart	Birmingham Edgbaston	1997	2017	Retired
Labour	Dari Taylor	Stockton South	1997	2010	Defeated
Liberal Democrats	Jenny Tonge	Richmond Park	1997	2005	Retired
Labour	Claire Ward	Watford	1997	2010	Defeated
Labour	Betty Williams	Conwy	1997	2010	Retired
Labour	Rosie Winterton	Doncaster Central	1997	2024	Retired
Liberal Democrats	Sandra Gidley	Romsey	2000	2010	Defeated in Romsey and Southampton North
Labour	Vera Baird	Redcar	2001	2010	Defeated
Liberal Democrats	Annette Brooke	Mid Dorset and North Poole	2001	2015	Retired
Liberal Democrats	Patsy Calton	Cheadle	2001	2005	Died
Liberal Democrats	Sue Doughty	Guildford	2001	2005	Defeated
SNP	Annabelle Ewing	Perth	2001	2005	Defeated in Ochil and South Perthshire
Sinn Féin	Michelle Gildernew (Note: Also served as a Member of the Legislative Assembly (MLA).)	Fermanagh and South Tyrone	2001	2015	Defeated
Sinn Féin	Michelle Gildernew	Fermanagh and South Tyrone	2017	2024	Retired
UUP	Sylvia Hermon	North Down	2001	2010	Resigned from the UUP, became an Independent Unionist
Ind. Unionist	Sylvia Hermon	North Down	2010	2019	Retired
Labour	Ann McKechin	Glasgow Maryhill (2001–2005); Glasgow North (2005–2015)	2001	2015	Defeated
Labour	Anne Moffat	East Lothian	2001	2010	Deselected
Labour	Meg Munn	Sheffield Heeley	2001	2015	Retired
DUP	Iris Robinson (Note: Also served as a Member of the Northern Ireland Forum.)	Strangford	2001	2010	Expelled from the DUP, became an Independent Unionist
Ind. Unionist	Iris Robinson	Strangford	2010	2010	Resigned
Conservative	Angela Watkinson	Upminster (2001–2010); Hornchurch and Upminster (2010–2017)	2001	2017	Retired
Liberal Democrats	Sarah Teather	Brent East (2003–2010); Brent Central (2010–2015)	2003	2015	Retired
Labour	Celia Barlow	Hove	2005	2010	Defeated
Labour	Roberta Blackman-Woods	City of Durham	2005	2019	Retired
Labour	Lyn Brown	West Ham	2005	2024	Retired
Liberal Democrats	Lorely Burt	Solihull	2005	2015	Defeated
Labour	Dawn Butler	Brent South	2005	2010	Defeated in Brent Central
Labour	Dawn Butler	Brent Central (2015–2024); Brent East (2024–present)	2015	present	Serving
Labour	Katy Clark	North Ayrshire and Arran	2005	2015	Defeated
Labour	Rosie Cooper	West Lancashire	2005	2022	Resigned
Labour	Mary Creagh	Wakefield	2005	2019	Defeated
Labour	Mary Creagh	Coventry East	2024	present	Serving
Conservative	Nadine Dorries	Mid Bedfordshire	2005	2023	Resigned
Labour	Natascha Engel	North East Derbyshire	2005	2017	Defeated
Liberal Democrats	Lynne Featherstone (Note: Also served as a Member of the London Assembly (AM).)	Hornsey and Wood Green	2005	2015	Defeated
Liberal Democrats	Julia Goldsworthy	Falmouth and Camborne	2005	2010	Defeated in Camborne and Redruth
Labour	Helen Goodman	Bishop Auckland	2005	2019	Defeated
Conservative	Justine Greening	Putney	2005	2019	Lost Conservative whip, became an independent
Independent	Justine Greening	Putney	2019	2019	Retired
Labour	Nia Griffith	Llanelli	2005	present	Serving
Labour Co-op	Meg Hillier	Hackney South and Shoreditch	2005	present	Serving
Labour	Sharon Hodgson	Gateshead East and Washington West (2005–2010); Washington and Sunderland West (2010–2024); Washington and Gateshead South (2024–present)	2005	present	Serving
Labour	Siân James	Swansea East	2005	2015	Retired
Labour	Diana Johnson	Kingston upon Hull North (2005–2024); Kingston upon Hull North and Cottingham (2024–present)	2005	present	Serving
Liberal Democrats	Susan Kramer	Richmond Park	2005	2010	Defeated
Labour	Barbara Keeley	Worsley (2005–2010); Worsley and Eccles South (2010–2024)	2005	2024	Retired
Conservative	Anne Main	St Albans	2005	2019	Defeated
Labour	Kerry McCarthy	Bristol East	2005	present	Serving
Labour Co-op	Sarah McCarthy-Fry	Portsmouth North	2005	2010	Defeated
Conservative	Maria Miller	Basingstoke	2005	2024	Defeated
Conservative	Anne Milton	Guildford	2005	2019	Lost Conservative whip, became an independent
Independent	Anne Milton	Guildford	2019	2019	Defeated
Labour	Madeleine Moon	Bridgend	2005	2019	Defeated
Labour	Jessica Morden	Newport East	2005	present	Serving
Labour Co-op	Linda Riordan	Halifax	2005	2015	Retired
Labour	Alison Seabeck	Plymouth Devonport (2005–2010); Plymouth Moor View (2010–2015)	2005	2015	Defeated
Labour	Angela Smith	Sheffield Hillsborough (2005–2010); Penistone and Stocksbridge (2010–2019)	2005	2018	Left Labour Party, joined Change UK
Change UK	Angela Smith	Sheffield Hillsborough (2005–2010); Penistone and Stocksbridge (2010–2019)	2018	2019	Left Change UK, became an independent
Independent	Angela Smith	Sheffield Hillsborough (2005–2010); Penistone and Stocksbridge (2010–2019)	2019	2019	Joined the Liberal Democrats
Liberal Democrats	Angela Smith	Sheffield Hillsborough (2005–2010); Penistone and Stocksbridge (2010–2019)	2019	2019	Defeated in Altrincham and Sale West
Labour	Anne Snelgrove	South Swindon	2005	2010	Defeated
Liberal Democrats	Jo Swinson	East Dunbartonshire	2005	2015	Defeated
Liberal Democrats	Jo Swinson	East Dunbartonshire	2017	2019	Defeated
Labour	Emily Thornberry	Islington South and Finsbury	2005	present	Serving
Labour	Kitty Ussher	Burnley	2005	2010	Retired
Conservative	Theresa Villiers	Chipping Barnet	2005	2024	Defeated
Labour	Lynda Waltho	Stourbridge	2005	2010	Defeated
Liberal Democrats	Jenny Willott	Cardiff Central	2005	2015	Defeated
Conservative	Chloe Smith	Norwich North	2009	2024	Retired

== 2010 to 2024 ==
Party	Name	Constituency	Start	End	Reason
Labour	Rushanara Ali	Bethnal Green and Bow (2010–2024); Bethnal Green and Stepney (2024–present)	2010	present	Serving
Labour	Heidi Alexander	Lewisham East	2010	2018	Resigned
Labour	Heidi Alexander	Swindon South	2024	present	Serving
Conservative	Harriett Baldwin	West Worcestershire	2010	present	Serving
Labour Co-op	Luciana Berger	Liverpool Wavertree	2010	2018	Left Labour and Co-op, joined Change UK
Change UK	Luciana Berger	Liverpool Wavertree	2018	2019	Left Change UK, joined the Liberal Democrats
Liberal Democrats	Luciana Berger	Liverpool Wavertree	2019	2019	Defeated in Finchley and Golders Green
Conservative	Nicola Blackwood	Oxford West and Abingdon	2010	2017	Defeated
Conservative	Karen Bradley	Staffordshire Moorlands	2010	present	Serving
Conservative	Angie Bray	Ealing Central and Acton	2010	2015	Defeated
Conservative	Fiona Bruce	Congleton	2010	2024	Defeated
Labour	Jenny Chapman	Darlington	2010	2019	Defeated
Conservative	Thérèse Coffey	Suffolk Coastal	2010	2024	Defeated
Labour	Stella Creasy	Walthamstow	2010	present	Serving
Conservative	Tracey Crouch	Chatham and Aylesford	2010	2024	Retired
Labour	Margaret Curran	Glasgow East	2010	2015	Defeated
Labour	Gloria De Piero	Ashfield	2010	2019	Retired
Conservative	Caroline Dinenage	Gosport	2010	present	Serving
Labour Co-op	Gemma Doyle	West Dunbartonshire	2010	2015	Defeated
Conservative	Jackie Doyle-Price	Thurrock	2010	2024	Defeated
Labour	Julie Elliott	Sunderland Central	2010	2024	Retired
Conservative	Jane Ellison	Battersea	2010	2017	Defeated
Labour	Yvonne Fovargue	Makerfield	2010	2024	Retired
Conservative	Lorraine Fullbrook	South Ribble	2010	2015	Retired
Labour	Sheila Gilmore	Edinburgh East	2010	2015	Defeated
Labour	Pat Glass	North West Durham	2010	2017	Retired
Labour	Mary Glindon	North Tyneside (2010–2024); Newcastle upon Tyne East and Wallsend (2024–present)	2010	present	Serving
Conservative	Helen Grant	Maidstone and The Weald (2010–2024); Maidstone and Malling (2024–present)	2010	present	Serving
Labour	Kate Green	Stretford and Urmston	2010	2022	Resigned
Labour	Lilian Greenwood	Nottingham South	2010	present	Serving
Conservative	Rebecca Harris	Castle Point	2010	present	Serving
Labour	Julie Hilling	Bolton West	2010	2015	Defeated
Conservative	Margot James	Stourbridge	2010	2019	Retired
Labour	Cathy Jamieson	Kilmarnock and Loudoun	2010	2015	Defeated
Labour	Susan Elan Jones	Clwyd South	2010	2019	Defeated
Labour	Liz Kendall	Leicester West	2010	present	Serving
Conservative	Pauline Latham	Mid Derbyshire	2010	2024	Retired
Conservative	Andrea Leadsom	South Northamptonshire	2010	2024	Retired
Conservative	Jessica Lee	Erewash	2010	2015	Retired
Conservative	Charlotte Leslie	Bristol North West	2010	2017	Defeated
Alliance	Naomi Long	Belfast East	2010	2015	Defeated
Green	Caroline Lucas	Brighton Pavilion	2010	2024	Retired
Conservative	Karen Lumley	Redditch	2010	2017	Retired
Conservative	Mary Macleod	Brentford and Isleworth	2010	2015	Defeated
Labour	Shabana Mahmood	Birmingham Ladywood	2010	present	Serving
Labour	Alison McGovern	Wirral South (2010–2024); Birkenhead (2024–present)	2010	present	Serving
Labour	Catherine McKinnell	Newcastle upon Tyne North	2010	present	Serving
Conservative	Esther McVey	Wirral West	2010	2015	Defeated
Conservative	Esther McVey	Tatton	2017	present	Serving
Conservative	Louise Mensch	Corby	2010	2012	Resigned
Conservative	Penny Mordaunt	Portsmouth North	2010	2024	Defeated
Conservative	Nicky Morgan	Loughborough	2010	2019	Retired
Conservative	Anne Marie Morris	Newton Abbot	2010	2024	Defeated
Liberal Democrats	Tessa Munt	Wells	2010	2015	Defeated
Liberal Democrats	Tessa Munt	Wells and Mendip Hills	2024	present	Serving
Conservative	Sheryll Murray	South East Cornwall	2010	2024	Defeated
Labour	Lisa Nandy	Wigan	2010	present	Serving
Labour	Pamela Nash	Airdrie and Shotts	2010	2015	Defeated
Labour	Pamela Nash	Motherwell, Wishaw and Carluke	2024	present	Serving
Conservative	Sarah Newton	Truro and Falmouth	2010	2019	Retired
Conservative	Caroline Nokes	Romsey and Southampton North	2010	present	Serving
Labour	Fiona O'Donnell	East Lothian	2010	2015	Defeated
Labour	Chi Onwurah	Newcastle upon Tyne Central	2010	present	Serving
Conservative	Priti Patel	Witham	2010	present	Serving
Labour	Teresa Pearce	Erith and Thamesmead	2010	2019	Retired
Conservative	Claire Perry	Devizes	2010	2019	Retired
Labour	Bridget Phillipson	Houghton and Sunderland South	2010	present	Serving
Labour	Yasmin Qureshi	Bolton South East	2010	present	Serving
Labour	Rachel Reeves	Leeds West (2010–2024); Leeds West and Pudsey (2024–present)	2010	present	Serving
Labour	Emma Reynolds	Wolverhampton North East	2010	2019	Defeated
Labour	Emma Reynolds	Wycombe	2024	present	Serving
SDLP	Margaret Ritchie	South Down	2010	2017	Defeated
Conservative	Amber Rudd	Hastings and Rye	2010	2019	Left Conservative Party, became an independent
Independent	Amber Rudd	Hastings and Rye	2019	2019	Retired
Conservative	Laura Sandys	South Thanet	2010	2015	Retired
Conservative	Anna Soubry	Broxtowe	2010	2019	Left Conservative Party, joined Change UK
Change UK	Anna Soubry	Broxtowe	2019	2019	Defeated
Conservative	Liz Truss	South West Norfolk	2010	2024	Defeated
Labour	Valerie Vaz	Walsall South (2010–2024); Walsall and Bloxwich (2024–present)	2010	present	Serving
SNP	Eilidh Whiteford	Banff and Buchan	2010	2017	Defeated
Conservative	Heather Wheeler	South Derbyshire	2010	2024	Defeated
Conservative	Sarah Wollaston	Totnes	2010	2019	Left Conservative Party, joined Change UK
Change UK	Sarah Wollaston	Totnes	2019	2019	Left Change UK, became an independent
Independent	Sarah Wollaston	Totnes	2019	2019	Joined the Liberal Democrats
Liberal Democrats	Sarah Wollaston	Totnes	2019	2019	Defeated
Labour	Debbie Abrahams	Oldham East and Saddleworth	2011	present	Serving
Labour Co-op	Seema Malhotra	Feltham and Heston	2011	present	Serving
Labour Co-op	Lucy Powell	Manchester Central	2012	present	Serving
Labour	Sarah Champion	Rotherham	2012	present	Serving
Labour	Emma Lewell-Buck	South Shields	2013	present	Serving
Labour	Liz McInnes	Heywood and Middleton	2014	2019	Defeated
SNP	Tasmina Ahmed-Sheikh	Ochil and South Perthshire	2015	2017	Defeated
Conservative	Heidi Allen	South Cambridgeshire	2015	2019	Left Conservative Party, joined Change UK
Change UK	Heidi Allen	South Cambridgeshire	2019	2019	Left Change UK, joined the Liberal Democrats
Liberal Democrats	Heidi Allen	South Cambridgeshire	2019	2019	Retired
Conservative	Lucy Allan	Telford	2015	2024	Lost Conservative whip, became an independent
Independent	Lucy Allan	Telford	2024	2024	Retired
Conservative	Caroline Ansell	Eastbourne	2015	2017	Defeated
Conservative	Caroline Ansell	Eastbourne	2019	2024	Defeated
Conservative	Victoria Atkins	Louth and Horncastle	2015	present	Serving
SNP	Hannah Bardell	Livingston	2015	2024	Defeated
SNP	Mhairi Black	Paisley and Renfrewshire South	2015	2024	Retired
SNP	Kirsty Blackman	Aberdeen North	2015	present	Serving
Conservative	Victoria Borwick	Kensington	2015	2017	Defeated
Conservative	Suella Braverman	Fareham (2015–2024); Fareham and Waterlooville (2024–present)	2015	2026	Left Conservative Party, joined Reform UK
Reform	Suella Braverman	Fareham (2015–2024); Fareham and Waterlooville (2024–present)	2026	present	Serving
SNP	Deidre Brock	Edinburgh North and Leith	2015	2024	Defeated
Labour	Ruth Cadbury	Brentford and Isleworth	2015	present	Serving
SNP	Lisa Cameron	East Kilbride, Strathaven and Lesmahagow	2015	2023	Left the SNP, joined the Conservative Party
Conservative	Lisa Cameron	East Kilbride, Strathaven and Lesmahagow	2023	2024	Retired
Conservative	Maria Caulfield	Lewes	2015	2024	Defeated
SNP	Joanna Cherry	Edinburgh South West	2015	2024	Defeated
Conservative	Jo Churchill	Bury St Edmunds	2015	2024	Retired
Labour	Julie Cooper	Burnley	2015	2019	Defeated
Labour	Jo Cox	Batley and Spen	2015	2016	Murdered
SNP	Angela Crawley	Lanark and Hamilton East	2015	2024	Retired
Labour	Judith Cummins	Bradford South	2015	present	Serving
Conservative	Mims Davies	Eastleigh (2015–2019); Mid Sussex (2019–2024); East Grinstead and Uckfield (2024–present)	2015	present	Serving
Labour	Thangam Debbonaire	Bristol West	2015	2024	Defeated in Bristol Central
Conservative	Michelle Donelan	Chippenham	2015	2024	Defeated in Melksham and Devizes
Conservative	Flick Drummond	Portsmouth South	2015	2017	Defeated
Conservative	Flick Drummond	Meon Valley	2019	2024	Defeated in Winchester
SNP	Marion Fellows	Motherwell and Wishaw	2015	2024	Defeated in Motherwell, Wishaw and Carluke
SNP	Margaret Ferrier	Rutherglen and Hamilton West	2015	2017	Defeated
SNP	Margaret Ferrier	Rutherglen and Hamilton West	2019	2020	Suspended from the SNP, became an independent
Independent	Margaret Ferrier	Rutherglen and Hamilton West	2020	2023	Removed from office
Labour	Colleen Fletcher	Coventry North East	2015	2024	Retired
Labour	Vicky Foxcroft	Lewisham Deptford	2015	present	Serving
Conservative	Lucy Frazer	South East Cambridgeshire	2015	2024	Defeated in Ely and East Cambridgeshire
Conservative	Nus Ghani	Wealden (2015–2024); Sussex Weald (2024–present)	2015	present	Serving
SNP	Patricia Gibson	North Ayrshire and Arran	2015	2024	Defeated
Labour	Margaret Greenwood	Wirral West	2015	2024	Retired
Labour	Louise Haigh	Sheffield Heeley	2015	present	Serving
Labour	Carolyn Harris	Swansea East (2015–2024); Neath and Swansea East (2024–present)	2015	present	Serving
Labour	Helen Hayes	Dulwich and West Norwood	2015	present	Serving
Labour	Sue Hayman	Workington	2015	2019	Defeated
Labour	Kate Hollern	Blackburn	2015	2024	Defeated
Labour	Rupa Huq	Ealing Central and Acton	2015	present	Serving
Conservative	Andrea Jenkyns	Morley and Outwood	2015	2024	Defeated in Leeds South West and Morley
Conservative	Seema Kennedy	South Ribble	2015	2019	Retired
Labour	Rebecca Long-Bailey	Salford and Eccles (2015–2024); Salford (2024–present)	2015	present	Serving
Labour	Holly Lynch	Halifax	2015	2024	Retired
Labour Co-op	Rachael Maskell	York Central	2015	present	Serving
Conservative	Tania Mathias	Twickenham	2015	2017	Defeated
SNP	Natalie McGarry	Glasgow East	2015	2016	Expelled from the SNP, became an independent
Independent	Natalie McGarry	Glasgow East	2016	2017	Retired
SNP	Anne McLaughlin	Glasgow North East	2015	2017	Defeated
SNP	Anne McLaughlin	Glasgow North East	2019	2024	Defeated
Conservative	Amanda Milling	Cannock Chase	2015	2024	Defeated
SNP	Carol Monaghan	Glasgow North West	2015	2024	Defeated in Glasgow South
Conservative	Wendy Morton	Aldridge-Brownhills	2015	present	Serving
Labour	Melanie Onn	Great Grimsby	2015	2019	Defeated
Labour	Melanie Onn	Great Grimsby	2024	present	Serving
Labour Co-op	Kate Osamor	Edmonton (2015–2024); Edmonton and Winchmore Hill (2024–present)	2015	present	Serving
SNP	Kirsten Oswald	East Renfrewshire	2015	2017	Defeated
SNP	Kirsten Oswald	East Renfrewshire	2019	2024	Defeated
Labour	Jess Phillips	Birmingham Yardley	2015	present	Serving
Conservative	Rebecca Pow	Taunton Deane	2015	2024	Defeated in Taunton and Wellington
Conservative	Victoria Prentis	Banbury	2015	2024	Defeated
Labour	Angela Rayner	Ashton-under-Lyne	2015	present	Serving
Labour Co-op	Christina Rees	Neath	2015	2024	Retired after being barred from re-selection
Labour	Marie Rimmer	St Helens South and Whiston	2015	present	Serving
Conservative	Mary Robinson	Cheadle	2015	2024	Defeated
Conservative	Antoinette Sandbach	Eddisbury	2015	2019	Lost Conservative whip and deselected, became an independent
Independent	Antoinette Sandbach	Eddisbury	2019	2019	Joined the Liberal Democrats
Liberal Democrats	Antoinette Sandbach	Eddisbury	2019	2019	Defeated
Plaid Cymru	Liz Saville Roberts	Dwyfor Meirionnydd	2015	present	Serving
Labour	Naz Shah	Bradford West	2015	present	Serving
Labour	Paula Sherriff	Dewsbury	2015	2019	Defeated
Labour	Tulip Siddiq	Hampstead and Kilburn (2015–2024); Hampstead and Highgate (2024–present)	2015	present	Serving
Labour	Ruth Smeeth	Stoke-on-Trent North	2015	2019	Defeated
Labour	Cat Smith	Lancaster and Fleetwood (2015–2024); Lancaster and Wyre (2024–present)	2015	present	Serving
Labour	Karin Smyth	Bristol South	2015	present	Serving
Conservative	Amanda Solloway	Derby North	2015	2017	Defeated
Conservative	Amanda Solloway	Derby North	2019	2024	Defeated
Labour	Jo Stevens	Cardiff Central (2015–2024); Cardiff East (2024–present)	2015	present	Serving
SNP	Alison Thewliss	Glasgow Central	2015	2024	Defeated in Glasgow North
SNP	Michelle Thomson	Edinburgh West	2015	2016	Expelled from the SNP, became an independent
Independent	Michelle Thomson	Edinburgh West	2016	2017	Retired
Conservative	Maggie Throup	Erewash	2015	2024	Defeated
Conservative	Kelly Tolhurst	Rochester and Strood	2015	2024	Defeated
Conservative	Anne-Marie Trevelyan	Berwick-upon-Tweed	2015	2024	Defeated in North Northumberland
Labour Co-op	Anna Turley	Redcar	2015	2019	Defeated
Labour Co-op	Anna Turley	Redcar	2024	present	Serving
Labour	Catherine West	Hornsey and Wood Green (2015–2024); Hornsey and Friern Barnet (2024–present)	2015	present	Serving
Conservative	Helen Whately	Faversham and Mid Kent	2015	present	Serving
SNP	Philippa Whitford	Central Ayrshire	2015	2024	Retired
SNP	Corri Wilson	Ayr, Carrick and Cumnock	2015	2017	Defeated
Labour	Rosena Allin-Khan	Tooting	2016	present	Serving
Labour	Gill Furniss	Sheffield Brightside and Hillsborough	2016	present	Serving
Labour Co-op	Tracy Brabin (Note: Also served as a directly-elected strategic authority mayor.)	Batley and Spen	2016	2021	Resigned
Liberal Democrats	Sarah Olney	Richmond Park	2016	2017	Defeated
Liberal Democrats	Sarah Olney	Richmond Park	2019	present	Serving
Conservative	Caroline Johnson	Sleaford and North Hykeham	2016	present	Serving
Conservative	Trudy Harrison	Copeland	2017	2024	Retired
Labour	Tonia Antoniazzi	Gower	2017	present	Serving
Conservative	Kemi Badenoch	Saffron Walden (2017–2024); North West Essex (2024–present)	2017	present	Serving
Labour	Marsha de Cordova	Battersea	2017	present	Serving
Labour	Emma Dent Coad	Kensington	2017	2019	Defeated
Labour Co-op	Anneliese Dodds	Oxford East	2017	present	Serving
Labour	Rosie Duffield	Canterbury	2017	2024	Resigned from Labour, became an independent
Independent	Rosie Duffield	Canterbury	2024	present	Serving
Conservative	Vicky Ford	Chelmsford	2017	2024	Defeated
Labour	Ruth George	High Peak	2017	2019	Defeated
Labour Co-op	Preet Kaur Gill	Birmingham Edgbaston	2017	present	Serving
Conservative	Kirstene Hair	Angus	2017	2019	Defeated
Labour	Emma Hardy	Kingston upon Hull West and Hessle (2017–2024); Kingston upon Hull West and Haltemprice (2024–present)	2017	present	Serving
Liberal Democrats	Wera Hobhouse	Bath	2017	present	Serving
Liberal Democrats	Christine Jardine	Edinburgh West	2017	present	Serving
Labour	Sarah Jones	Croydon Central (2017–2024); Croydon West (2024–present)	2017	present	Serving
Conservative	Gillian Keegan	Chichester	2017	2024	Defeated
Labour	Lesley Laird	Kirkcaldy and Cowdenbeath	2017	2019	Defeated
Labour	Karen Lee	Lincoln	2017	2019	Defeated
DUP	Emma Little-Pengelly	Belfast South	2017	2019	Defeated
Conservative	Julia Lopez	Hornchurch and Upminster	2017	present	Serving
Conservative	Rachel Maclean	Redditch	2017	2024	Defeated
Sinn Féin	Elisha McCallion	Foyle	2017	2019	Defeated
Labour	Anna McMorrin	Cardiff North	2017	present	Serving
Liberal Democrats	Layla Moran	Oxford West and Abingdon	2017	present	Serving
Labour	Fiona Onasanya	Peterborough	2017	2018	Expelled from Labour, became an independent
Independent	Fiona Onasanya	Peterborough	2018	2019	Removed from office
Labour	Stephanie Peacock	Barnsley East (2017–2024); Barnsley South (2024–present)	2017	present	Serving
Labour	Laura Pidcock	North West Durham	2017	2019	Defeated
Labour Co-op	Jo Platt	Leigh	2017	2019	Defeated
Labour Co-op	Jo Platt	Leigh and Atherton	2024	present	Serving
Labour	Ellie Reeves	Lewisham West and Penge (2017–2024); Lewisham West and East Dulwich (2024–present)	2017	present	Serving
Labour	Danielle Rowley	Midlothian	2017	2019	Defeated
Labour	Eleanor Smith	Wolverhampton South West	2017	2019	Defeated
Labour	Laura Smith	Crewe and Nantwich	2017	2019	Defeated
Labour	Liz Twist	Blaydon	2017	present	Serving
Labour	Thelma Walker	Colne Valley	2017	2019	Defeated
Sinn Féin	Órfhlaith Begley	West Tyrone	2018	present	Serving
Labour	Janet Daby	Lewisham East	2018	present	Serving
Liberal Democrats	Jane Dodds	Brecon and Radnorshire	2019	2019	Defeated
Labour	Ruth Jones	Newport West (2019–2024); Newport West and Islwyn (2024–present)	2019	present	Serving
Labour	Lisa Forbes	Peterborough	2019	2019	Defeated
Conservative	Nickie Aiken	Cities of London and Westminster	2019	2024	Retired
Labour	Fleur Anderson	Putney	2019	present	Serving
Conservative	Sarah Atherton	Wrexham	2019	2024	Defeated
Conservative	Siobhan Baillie	Stroud	2019	2024	Defeated
Labour	Paula Barker	Liverpool Wavertree	2019	present	Serving
Labour	Apsana Begum	Poplar and Limehouse	2019	present	Serving
Labour	Olivia Blake	Sheffield Hallam	2019	present	Serving
Conservative	Sara Britcliffe	Hyndburn	2019	2024	Defeated
Conservative	Felicity Buchan	Kensington	2019	2024	Defeated in Kensington and Bayswater
SNP	Amy Callaghan	East Dunbartonshire	2019	2024	Defeated in Mid Dunbartonshire
Conservative	Miriam Cates	Penistone and Stocksbridge	2019	2024	Defeated
Liberal Democrats	Wendy Chamberlain	North East Fife	2019	present	Serving
Labour	Feryal Clark	Enfield North	2019	present	Serving
Conservative	Theo Clarke	Stafford	2019	2024	Defeated
Liberal Democrats	Daisy Cooper	St Albans	2019	present	Serving
Conservative	Claire Coutinho	East Surrey	2019	present	Serving
Conservative	Virginia Crosbie	Ynys Môn	2019	2024	Defeated
Labour	Alex Davies-Jones	Pontypridd	2019	present	Serving
Conservative	Dehenna Davison	Bishop Auckland	2019	2024	Retired
Conservative	Sarah Dines	Derbyshire Dales	2019	2024	Defeated
Conservative	Ruth Edwards	Rushcliffe	2019	2024	Defeated
Conservative	Natalie Elphicke	Dover	2019	2024	Left Conservative Party, joined Labour Party
Labour	Natalie Elphicke	Dover	2024	2024	Retired
Labour Co-op	Florence Eshalomi	Vauxhall (2019–2024); Vauxhall and Camberwell Green (2024–present)	2019	present	Serving
Conservative	Laura Farris	Newbury	2019	2024	Defeated
Conservative	Katherine Fletcher	South Ribble	2019	2024	Defeated
Labour	Mary Kelly Foy	City of Durham	2019	present	Serving
Conservative	Jo Gideon	Stoke-on-Trent Central	2019	2024	Retired
SDLP	Claire Hanna	Belfast South (2019–2024); Belfast South and Mid Down (2024–present)	2019	present	Serving
Conservative	Sally-Ann Hart	Hastings and Rye	2019	2024	Defeated
Labour	Rachel Hopkins	Luton South (2019–2024); Luton South and South Bedfordshire (2024–present)	2019	present	Serving
Conservative	Jane Hunt	Loughborough	2019	2024	Defeated
Labour	Kim Johnson	Liverpool Riverside	2019	present	Serving
Conservative	Fay Jones	Brecon and Radnorshire	2019	2024	Defeated in Brecon, Radnor and Cwm Tawe
Conservative	Alicia Kearns	Rutland and Melton (2019–2024); Rutland and Stamford (2024–present)	2019	present	Serving
Conservative	Kate Kniveton	Burton	2019	2024	Defeated in Burton and Uttoxeter
DUP	Carla Lockhart	Upper Bann	2019	2026	Left DUP
Ind. Unionist	Carla Lockhart	Upper Bann	2026	present	Serving
Conservative	Cherilyn Mackrory	Truro and Falmouth	2019	2024	Defeated
Conservative	Julie Marson	Hertford and Stortford	2019	2024	Defeated
Conservative	Joy Morrissey	Beaconsfield	2019	present	Serving
Conservative	Holly Mumby-Croft	Scunthorpe	2019	2024	Defeated
Labour	Charlotte Nichols	Warrington North	2019	present	Serving
Conservative	Lia Nici	Great Grimsby	2019	2024	Defeated
Labour	Abena Oppong-Asare	Erith and Thamesmead	2019	present	Serving
Labour	Kate Osborne	Jarrow (2019–2024); Jarrow and Gateshead East (2024–present)	2019	present	Serving
Labour	Taiwo Owatemi	Coventry North West	2019	present	Serving
Labour	Sarah Owen	Luton North	2019	present	Serving
Labour	Bell Ribeiro-Addy	Streatham (2019–2024); Clapham and Brixton Hill (2024–present)	2019	present	Serving
Conservative	Nicola Richards	West Bromwich East	2019	2024	Retired
Conservative	Angela Richardson	Guildford	2019	2024	Defeated
Conservative	Selaine Saxby	North Devon	2019	2024	Defeated
Conservative	Jane Stevenson	Wolverhampton North East	2019	2024	Defeated
Labour	Zarah Sultana	Coventry South	2019	2025	Resigned from Labour, became an independent
Independent	Zarah Sultana	Coventry South	2025	2025	Joined Your Party
Your	Zarah Sultana	Coventry South	2025	present	Serving
Conservative	Laura Trott	Sevenoaks	2019	present	Serving
Conservative	Katie Wallis	Bridgend	2019	2024	Retired
Conservative	Suzanne Webb	Stourbridge	2019	2024	Defeated
Labour	Claudia Webbe	Leicester East	2019	2020	Suspended and later expelled from Labour, became an independent
Independent	Claudia Webbe	Leicester East	2020	2024	Defeated
Labour	Nadia Whittome	Nottingham East	2019	present	Serving
Liberal Democrats	Munira Wilson	Twickenham	2019	present	Serving
Labour	Beth Winter	Cynon Valley	2019	2024	Deselected
Conservative	Jill Mortimer	Hartlepool	2021	2024	Defeated
SNP	Anum Qaisar	Airdrie and Shotts	2021	2024	Defeated
Liberal Democrats	Sarah Green	Chesham and Amersham	2021	present	Serving
Labour	Kim Leadbeater	Batley and Spen (2021–2024); Spen Valley (2024–present)	2021	present	Serving
Liberal Democrats	Helen Morgan	North Shropshire	2021	present	Serving
Conservative	Anna Firth	Southend West	2022	2024	Defeated in Southend West and Leigh
Labour	Paulette Hamilton	Birmingham Erdington	2022	present	Serving
Labour	Samantha Dixon	City of Chester (2022–2024); Chester North and Neston (2024–present)	2022	present	Serving
Labour	Ashley Dalton	West Lancashire	2023	present	Serving
Liberal Democrats	Sarah Dyke	Somerton and Frome (2023–2024); Glastonbury and Somerton (2024–present)	2023	present	Serving
Labour	Sarah Edwards	Tamworth	2023	present	Serving
Labour	Gen Kitchen	Wellingborough	2024	present	Serving

== 2024 to present ==
Party	Name	Constituency	Start	End	Reason
Labour	Jess Asato	Lowestoft	2024	present	Serving
Labour	Catherine Atkinson	Derby North	2024	present	Serving
Labour	Olivia Bailey	Reading West and Mid Berkshire	2024	present	Serving
Labour Co-op	Alex Baker	Aldershot	2024	present	Serving
Labour	Antonia Bance	Tipton and Wednesbury	2024	present	Serving
Labour	Johanna Baxter	Paisley and Renfrewshire South	2024	present	Serving
Labour	Lorraine Beavers	Blackpool North and Fleetwood	2024	present	Serving
Liberal Democrats	Alison Bennett	Mid Sussex	2024	present	Serving
Green	Siân Berry	Brighton Pavilion	2024	present	Serving
Labour	Polly Billington	East Thanet	2024	present	Serving
Labour Co-op	Rachel Blake	Cities of London and Westminster	2024	present	Serving
Labour Co-op	Elsie Blundell	Heywood and Middleton North	2024	present	Serving
Conservative	Sarah Bool	South Northamptonshire	2024	present	Serving
Labour	Jade Botterill	Ossett and Denby Dale	2024	present	Serving
Labour	Sureena Brackenridge	Wolverhampton North East	2024	present	Serving
Conservative	Aphra Brandreth	Chester South and Eddisbury	2024	present	Serving
Liberal Democrats	Alex Brewer	North East Hampshire	2024	present	Serving
Liberal Democrats	Jess Brown-Fuller	Chichester	2024	present	Serving
Labour	Julia Buckley	Shrewsbury	2024	present	Serving
Labour	Maureen Burke	Glasgow North East	2024	present	Serving
Labour	Nesil Caliskan	Barking	2024	present	Serving
Labour	Irene Campbell	North Ayrshire and Arran	2024	present	Serving
Labour	Juliet Campbell	Broxtowe	2024	present	Serving
Liberal Democrats	Charlotte Cane	Ely and East Cambridgeshire	2024	present	Serving
Green	Ellie Chowns	North Herefordshire	2024	present	Serving
Labour	Lizzi Collinge	Morecambe and Lunesdale	2024	present	Serving
Liberal Democrats	Victoria Collins	Harpenden and Berkhamsted	2024	present	Serving
Labour	Sarah Coombes	West Bromwich	2024	present	Serving
Labour	Beccy Cooper	Worthing West	2024	present	Serving
Labour	Deirdre Costigan	Ealing Southall	2024	present	Serving
Labour	Pam Cox	Colchester	2024	present	Serving
Labour	Jen Craft	Thurrock	2024	present	Serving
Conservative	Harriet Cross	Gordon and Buchan	2024	present	Serving
Sinn Féin	Pat Cullen	Fermanagh and South Tyrone	2024	present	Serving
Labour	Emily Darlington	Milton Keynes Central	2024	present	Serving
Plaid Cymru	Ann Davies	Caerfyrddin	2024	present	Serving
Labour Co-op	Kate Dearden	Halifax	2024	present	Serving
Green	Carla Denyer	Bristol Central	2024	present	Serving
Labour	Anna Dixon	Shipley	2024	present	Serving
Labour Co-op	Helena Dollimore	Hastings and Rye	2024	present	Serving
Alliance	Sorcha Eastwood	Lagan Valley	2024	present	Serving
Labour	Cat Eccles	Stourbridge	2024	present	Serving
Labour	Lauren Edwards	Rochester and Strood	2024	present	Serving
Labour	Maya Ellis	Ribble Valley	2024	present	Serving
Labour	Kirith Entwistle	Bolton North East	2024	present	Serving
Labour Co-op	Miatta Fahnbulleh	Peckham	2024	present	Serving
Labour	Linsey Farnsworth	Amber Valley	2024	present	Serving
Labour	Patricia Ferguson	Glasgow South	2024	present	Serving
Labour	Natalie Fleet	Bolsover	2024	present	Serving
Labour Co-op	Emma Foody	Cramlington and Killingworth	2024	present	Serving
Labour	Catherine Fookes	Monmouthshire	2024	present	Serving
Liberal Democrats	Zöe Franklin	Guildford	2024	present	Serving
Labour	Allison Gardner	Stoke-on-Trent North	2024	present	Serving
Labour	Anna Gelderd	South East Cornwall	2024	present	Serving
Labour	Gill German	Clwyd North	2024	present	Serving
Liberal Democrats	Sarah Gibson	Chippenham	2024	present	Serving
Labour	Tracy Gilbert	Edinburgh North and Leith	2024	present	Serving
Liberal Democrats	Rachel Gilmour	Tiverton and Minehead	2024	present	Serving
Labour	Becky Gittins	Clwyd East	2024	present	Serving
Liberal Democrats	Marie Goldman	Chelmsford	2024	present	Serving
Labour	Jodie Gosling	Nuneaton	2024	present	Serving
Labour	Georgia Gould	Queen's Park and Maida Vale	2024	present	Serving
Conservative	Alison Griffiths	Bognor Regis and Littlehampton	2024	present	Serving
Labour	Amanda Hack	North West Leicestershire	2024	present	Serving
Labour Co-op	Sarah Hall	Warrington South	2024	present	Serving
Liberal Democrats	Monica Harding	Esher and Walton	2024	present	Serving
Labour	Claire Hazelgrove	Filton and Bradley Stoke	2024	present	Serving
Liberal Democrats	Pippa Heylings	South Cambridgeshire	2024	present	Serving
Labour	Claire Hughes	Bangor Aberconwy	2024	present	Serving
Labour	Alison Hume	Scarborough and Whitby	2024	present	Serving
Labour	Leigh Ingham	Stafford	2024	present	Serving
Labour	Natasha Irons	Croydon East	2024	present	Serving
Labour Co-op	Sally Jameson	Doncaster Central	2024	present	Serving
Liberal Democrats	Liz Jarvis	Eastleigh	2024	present	Serving
Labour	Lillian Jones	Kilmarnock and Loudoun	2024	present	Serving
Labour	Louise Jones	North East Derbyshire	2024	present	Serving
Labour	Satvir Kaur	Southampton Test	2024	present	Serving
Labour	Naushabah Khan	Gillingham and Rainham	2024	present	Serving
Labour Co-op	Jayne Kirkham	Truro and Falmouth	2024	present	Serving
Labour	Sonia Kumar	Dudley	2024	present	Serving
Labour	Uma Kumaran	Stratford and Bow	2024	present	Serving
Labour	Laura Kyrke-Smith	Aylesbury	2024	present	Serving
Conservative	Katie Lam	Weald of Kent	2024	present	Serving
Labour Co-op	Alice Macdonald	Norwich North	2024	present	Serving
Liberal Democrats	Helen Maguire	Epsom and Ewell	2024	present	Serving
Labour	Amanda Martin	Portsmouth North	2024	present	Serving
Labour	Alex Mayer	Dunstable and Leighton Buzzard	2024	present	Serving
Labour	Lola McEvoy	Darlington	2024	present	Serving
Labour Co-op	Kirsty McNeill	Midlothian	2024	present	Serving
Plaid Cymru	Llinos Medi	Ynys Môn	2024	present	Serving
Labour	Anneliese Midgley	Knowsley	2024	present	Serving
Labour	Julie Minns	Carlisle	2024	present	Serving
Labour	Abtisam Mohamed	Sheffield Hillsborough	2024	present	Serving
Labour	Margaret Mullane	Dagenham and Rainham	2024	present	Serving
Labour	Katrina Murray	Cumbernauld and Kirkintilloch	2024	present	Serving
Liberal Democrats	Susan Murray	Mid Dunbartonshire	2024	present	Serving
Labour	Samantha Niblett	South Derbyshire	2023	present	Serving
Conservative	Rebecca Paul	Reigate	2024	present	Serving
Liberal Democrats	Manuela Perteghella	Stratford-on-Avon	2024	present	Serving
Conservative	Shivani Raja	Leicester East	2024	present	Serving
Labour	Joani Reid	East Kilbride and Strathaven	2024	present	Serving
Labour	Jenny Riddell-Carpenter	Suffolk Coastal	2024	present	Serving
Labour	Lucy Rigby	Northampton North	2024	present	Serving
Labour	Sarah Russell	Congleton	2024	present	Serving
Liberal Democrats	Anna Sabine	Frome and East Somerset	2024	present	Serving
Labour	Sarah Sackman	Finchley and Golders Green	2024	present	Serving
Liberal Democrats	Roz Savage	South Cotswolds	2024	present	Serving
Labour	Michelle Scrogham	Barrow and Furness	2024	present	Serving
Liberal Democrats	Vikki Slade	Mid Dorset and North Poole	2024	present	Serving
Liberal Democrats	Lisa Smart	Hazel Grove	2024	present	Serving
Conservative	Rebecca Smith	South West Devon	2024	present	Serving
Labour	Sarah Smith	Hyndburn	2024	present	Serving
Labour	Elaine Stewart	Ayr, Carrick and Cumnock	2024	present	Serving
Labour Co-op	Kirsteen Sullivan	Linlithgow	2024	present	Serving
Labour	Lauren Sullivan	Gravesham	2024	present	Serving
Labour	Alison Taylor	Paisley and Renfrewshire North	2024	present	Serving
Labour	Rachel Taylor	North Warwickshire and Bedworth	2024	present	Serving
Labour	Marie Tidball	Penistone and Stocksbridge	2024	present	Serving
Labour	Jessica Toale	Bournemouth West	2024	present	Serving
Labour	Harpreet Uppal	Huddersfield	2024	present	Serving
Liberal Democrats	Caroline Voaden	South Devon	2024	present	Serving
Labour	Imogen Walker	Hamilton and Clyde Valley	2024	present	Serving
Labour	Melanie Ward	Cowdenbeath and Kirkcaldy	2024	present	Serving
Labour	Michelle Welsh	Sherwood Forest	2024	present	Serving
Labour	Jo White	Bassetlaw	2024	present	Serving
Labour	Katie White	Leeds North West	2024	present	Serving
Labour	Rosie Wrighting	Kettering	2024	present	Serving
Labour	Yuan Yang	Earley and Woodley	2024	present	Serving
Liberal Democrats	Claire Young	Thornbury and Yate	2024	present	Serving
Reform	Sarah Pochin	Runcorn and Helsby	2025	present	Serving
Green	Hannah Spencer	Gorton and Denton	2026	present	Serving
SNP	Lara Bird	Arbroath and Broughty Ferry	2026	present	Serving
Labour	Sagal Abdi-Wali	Holborn and St Pancras	2026	present	Serving

== Proportion of women ==
Numbers and proportions are as they were directly after the relevant election and do not take into account by-elections, defections, or other changes in membership. Instead, women who were initially by-elected to their seats and later successful in holding them at a subsequent general election are counted as having won the latter to serve full terms, if completed. Parties whose MPs have taken or took the whip from one of the major parties (Labour and Co-operative Party for the Labour Party and historically UUP before 1974, Unionist in Scotland until 1965, or National Liberal from 1950 to 1968 for the Conservative Party) have been included in the Conservatives' or Labour's totals.

Election	Conservative			Labour			Liberal to 1988, then Lib Dems			Others			Total		
Election	Women	Total	%	Women	Total	%	Women	Total	%	Women	Total	%	Women	Total	%
1918	0	382	0.0%	0	57	0.0%	0	36	0.0%	1	232	0.4%	1	707	0.1%
1922	1	344	0.3%	0	142	0.0%	1	62	1.6%	0	67	0.0%	2	615	0.3%
1923	3	258	1.2%	3	191	1.6%	2	158	1.3%	0	7	0.0%	8	615	1.3%
1924	3	412	0.7%	1	151	0.7%	0	40	0.0%	0	12	0.0%	4	615	0.7%
1929	3	260	1.2%	9	287	3.1%	1	59	1.7%	1	9	11.1%	14	615	2.3%
1931	13	470	2.8%	0	52	0.0%	0	33	0.0%	2	60	3.3%	15	615	2.4%
1935	6	386	1.6%	1	154	0.6%	1	21	4.8%	1	54	1.9%	9	615	1.5%
1945	1	197	0.5%	21	393	5.3%	1	12	8.3%	1	38	2.6%	24	640	3.8%
1950	6	298	2.0%	14	315	4.4%	1	9	11.1%	0	2	0.0%	21	625	3.4%
1951	6	321	1.9%	11	295	3.7%	0	6	0.0%	0	3	0.0%	17	625	2.7%
1955	10	345	2.9%	14	277	5.1%	0	6	0.0%	0	2	0.0%	24	630	3.8%
1959	12	365	3.3%	13	258	5.0%	0	6	0%	0	1	0.0%	25	630	4.0%
1964	11	304	3.6%	18	317	5.7%	0	9	0.0%	0	0	0.0%	29	630	4.6%
1966	7	253	2.8%	19	364	5.2%	0	12	0.0%	0	1	0.0%	26	630	4.1%
1970	15	330	4.5%	10	288	3.5%	0	6	0.0%	1	6	16.7%	26	630	4.1%
1974 (F)	9	297	3.0%	13	301	4.3%	0	14	0.0%	1	7	14.3%	23	635	3.6%
1974 (O)	7	277	2.5%	18	319	5.6%	0	13	0.0%	2	26	7.7%	27	635	4.3%
1979	8	339	2.4%	11	269	4.1%	0	11	0.0%	0	16	0.0%	19	635	3.0%
1983	13	397	3.3%	10	209	4.8%	0	23	0.0%	0	21	0.0%	23	650	3.5%
1987	17	376	4.5%	21	229	9.2%	1	21	4.8%	2	24	8.3%	41	650	6.3%
1992	20	336	6.0%	37	271	13.7%	2	20	10.0%	1	24	4.2%	60	651	9.2%
1997	13	165	7.9%	101	418	24.2%	3	46	6.5%	3	30	10.0%	120	659	18.2%
2001	14	166	8.4%	95	413	23.0%	5	52	9.6%	4	24	16.7%	118	659	17.9%
2005	17	198	8.6%	98	355	27.6%	10	62	16.1%	3	31	9.7%	128	646	19.8%
2010	49	306	16.0%	81	258	31.4%	7	57	12.3%	6	29	20.7%	143	650	22.0%
2015	68	330	20.6%	99	232	42.7%	0	8	0.0%	24	80	30.0%	191	650	29.4%
2017	67	317	21.1%	119	262	45.4%	4	12	33.3%	18	59	30.5%	208	650	32.0%
2019	87	365	23.8%	104	202	51.5%	7	11	63.6%	22	71	31.0%	220	650	33.8%
2024	29	121	24.0%	190	411	46.2%	32	72	44.4%	12	46	26.1%	263	650	40.5%

== See also ==
- All-women shortlist
- Election results of women in United Kingdom general elections (1918–1945)
- Lists of female political office-holders in the United Kingdom
  - List of female cabinet members of the United Kingdom
- Parliament (Qualification of Women) Act 1918
- Records of members of parliament of the United Kingdom § Women
- Timeline of female MPs in the House of Commons of the United Kingdom
- Widow's succession
- Women in the House of Commons of the United Kingdom
- Women in the House of Lords
  - List of female members of the House of Lords
