= Women in the House of Commons of the United Kingdom =

Females in the British House of Commons

The representation of women in the House of Commons of the United Kingdom has been an issue in the politics of the United Kingdom at numerous points in the 20th and 21st centuries. Originally debate centred on whether women should be allowed to vote and stand for election as Members of Parliament. The Parliament (Qualification of Women) Act 1918 gave women over 21 the right to stand for election as a Member of Parliament. The United Kingdom has had three female prime ministers: Margaret Thatcher (1979–1990), Theresa May (2016–2019), and Liz Truss (2022). The publication of the book Women in the House by Elizabeth Vallance in 1979 highlighted the under-representation of women in Parliament. In more modern times concerns about the under-representation of women led the Labour Party to introduce and, decades later, abandon all-women short lists, something which was later held to breach discrimination laws.

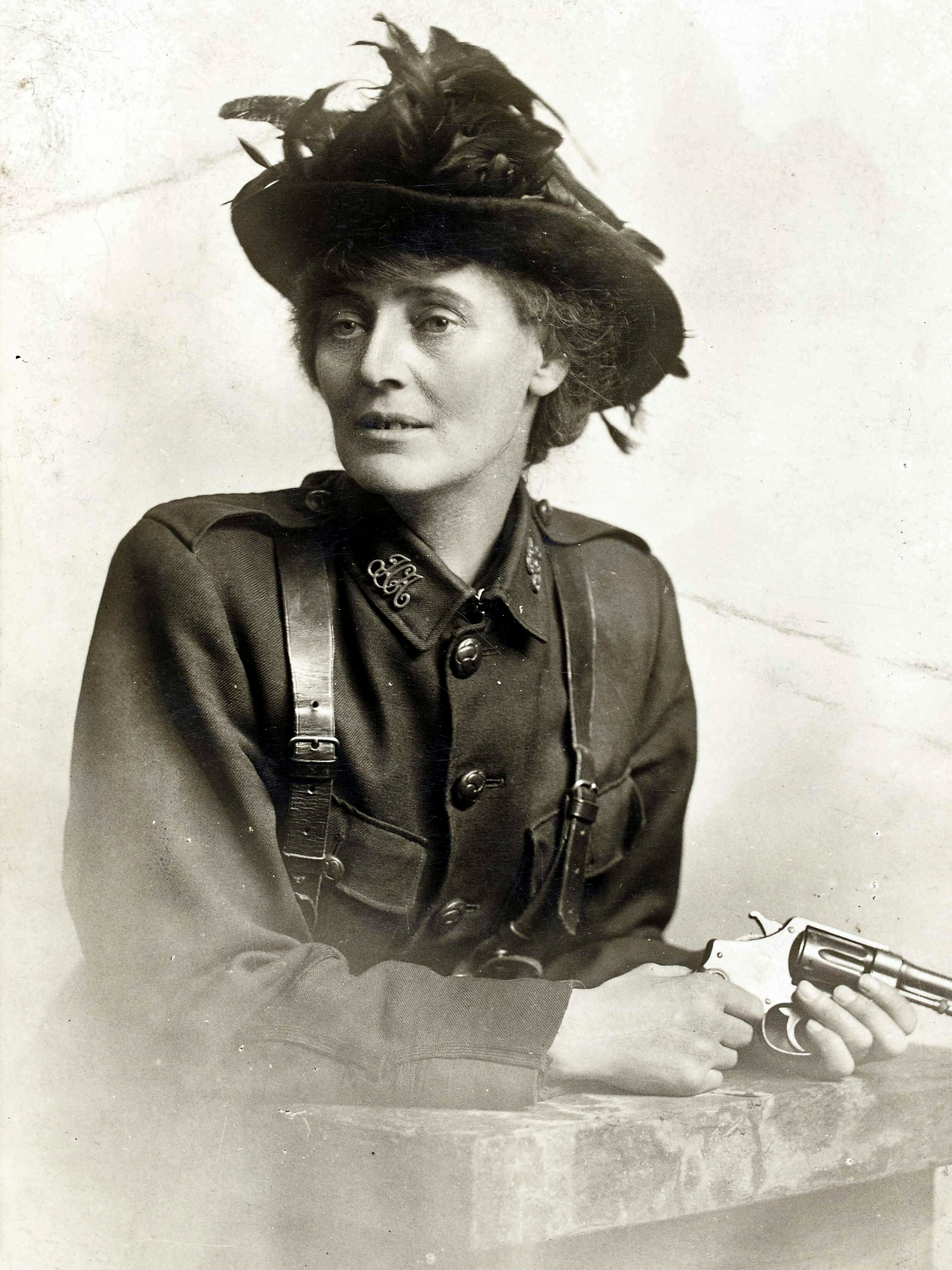
Constance Markievicz was the first woman elected to the British Parliament.

Between 1918 and 2026, a total of 697 women have been elected as Members of the House of Commons. As of October 2026 there are 266 women in the House of Commons, the highest ever. This is an all-time high at 41%. The previous number was 220, set in 2019, which accounted for 35% of members elected or re-elected that year. Additionally, at the 2024 general election the most female Labour MPs were elected or re-elected (190 women in total) – another instance in Labour's history that this has happened, after 119 in 2017. The female member of Parliament with the longest period of continuous service is informally known as the Mother of the House, who is Diane Abbott, following the 2024 election.

== Suffrage ==
In 1832 Henry Hunt became the first MP to raise the issue of women's suffrage in the House of Commons, followed in 1867 by John Stuart Mill. Following this attempts were made to widen the franchise in every Parliament.

Women gained the right to vote with the passing of the Representation of the People Act 1918 after World War I. This gave the vote to women over the age of 30. However, the Speakers Conference which was charged with looking into giving women the vote did not have as its terms of reference, consideration to women standing as candidates for Parliament. However, Sir Herbert Samuel, the former Liberal home secretary, moved a separate motion on 23 October 1918 to allow women to be eligible as Members of Parliament. The vote was passed by 274 to 25 and the government rushed through a bill to make it law in time for the 1918 general election. This bill did not specify any age restriction, unlike the voting bill. This later led to a number of incidents of women under the age of 30, who were not allowed to vote, standing for Parliament, notably the 27-year-old Liberal Ursula Williams standing in 1923.

== Landmarks and records ==
=== Political firsts for women in House of Commons ===
- 1918: Women able to stand for Parliament.
- 1918: First woman elected to Parliament (Constance Markievicz). However, as a member of Sinn Féin, she did not take her seat. Markievicz also became the only woman to represent an Irish constituency in Parliament until 1922 and the first female member who, before the election, chose to become a Catholic.
- 1919: Member of Parliament to take her seat (Nancy Astor) – for Coalition Conservatives
- 1921: British-born member to take her seat (Margaret Wintringham) – Liberal Party
- 1923: Disabled woman (Mabel Philipson) – Conservative Party. She had no vision in one eye.
- 1924: Minister (Margaret Bondfield) – for Labour Party
- 1926: Member to represent more than one constituency in non-consecutive terms (Margaret Bondfield) – Labour Party
- 1929: Cabinet minister and privy counsellor (Margaret Bondfield)
- 1929: Female Baby of the House (Jennie Lee) – Labour Party
- 1929: Independent member elected (Eleanor Rathbone)
- 1929: Non-Christian elected (Marion Phillips) – Labour Party
- 1929: Shortest-serving member (Ruth Dalton) – Labour Party; equalled in 1974 by Margo MacDonald – SNP
- 1931: Member to cross the floor (Cynthia Mosley) – from Labour to New Party
- 1931: Member to die in office and oldest woman elected (Ethel Bentham) – Labour Party
- 1938: Resignation from the House, i.e. appointment to a stewardship (The Duchess of Atholl) – Unionist Party
- 1943: Wheelchair user (Lady Apsley) – Conservative Party
- 1948: Chair of Committee of Whole House (Florence Paton) – Labour Party
- 1948: British-born Catholic (Alice Cullen) – Labour Party
- 1953: Member from Northern Ireland; first Irishwoman to take her seat (Patricia Ford) – Ulster Unionist Party
- 1965: Parliamentary Whip (Harriet Slater) – Labour Party
- 1969: Irish republican non-abstentionist (Bernadette Devlin McAliskey) – Unity
- 1970: Deputy speaker (Betty Harvie Anderson) – Conservative Party
- 1974: Youngest woman to leave the House (Bernadette Devlin McAliskey) – Independent Socialist
- 1975: Leader of the Opposition (Margaret Thatcher)
- 1976: Member outed as LGBT (Maureen Colquhoun) – Labour Party
- 1979: Prime Minister (Margaret Thatcher) who led the Conservative Party from 1975 to 1990.
- 1987: Member from ethnic or racial minorities (Diane Abbott) – Labour Party
- 1992: Speaker of the House of Commons (Betty Boothroyd) – Labour Party. As of 2026 she remains the only female to hold the office of House Speaker.
- 1997: Full-time Minister for Women (Joan Ruddock) – Labour Party
- 1997: Member who came out as LGBT in office (Angela Eagle) – Labour Party
- 1998: Chief Whip (Ann Taylor) – Labour Party
- 2010: LGBT member elected (Margot James) – Conservative Party
- 2010: Minor party members elected (Caroline Lucas – Green Party of England and Wales; Naomi Long – Alliance Party of Northern Ireland)
- 2015: Youngest woman elected (Mhairi Black) – SNP
- 2016: Cabinet minister to come out in office (Justine Greening) – Conservative Party
- 2016: Member to be assassinated (Jo Cox) – Labour Party. She became also the first Labour MP to die as a crime victim.
- 2017: Oldest woman to be re-elected (Ann Clwyd) - Labour Party
- 2019: Ethnic minority female holder of a Great Office of State (Priti Patel) – Conservative Party
- 2019: Non-Christian by choice of conversion elected (Charlotte Nichols), and hijab-wearing member (Apsana Begum) – Labour Party
- 2019: Oldest woman to leave the House (Ann Clwyd) – Labour Party
- 2019: Member to be recalled by a successful petition (Fiona Onasanya) – Independent, originally elected as Labour
- 2022: Youngest, shortest-serving prime minister (Liz Truss) and female deputy prime minister (Thérèse Coffey) – Conservative Party
- 2022: Member to vacate her seat for an actual paid office under the Crown (Rosie Cooper) – Labour Party
- 2024: Former prime minister to lose re-election (Liz Truss) – Conservative Party
- 2024: First female chancellor of the exchequer (Rachel Reeves) – Labour Party
- 2024: Ethnic minority deputy speaker (Nus Ghani) – Conservative Party
- 2024: Ethnic minority leader of the opposition and also her party's youngest female parliamentary leader (Kemi Badenoch) – Conservative Party

=== Records ===
Margaret Beckett has been the longest serving female MP in the history of the House of Commons. She was an MP for Lincoln from 10 October 1974 until 7 April 1979, and served as MP for Derby South from 9 June 1983 until 30 May 2024.

Harriet Harman has been the longest continuously serving female MP in the history of the House of Commons. She was MP for Peckham from 28 October 1982 until 1 May 1997, and served as MP for Camberwell and Peckham from 1 May 1997 to 30 May 2024. On 13 June 2017 Harman was dubbed "Mother of the House" by Prime Minister Theresa May, in recognition of her status as longest continuously serving woman MP (though she was not the longest serving MP overall, and would therefore not gain any official duties).

=== Female MPs with more than 25 years' service ===
As of 2024, there are 36 women (out of a total of 697) who have served 25 years or more service in the House of Commons, either continuously or cumulatively. They are listed below in alphabetical order.

| Party | Name | Constituency | Start | End | Continuous term | Total term |
|---|---|---|---|---|---|---|
| Labour | Diane Abbott | Hackney North and Stoke Newington | 1987 | present | 39 years, 4 months | 39 years, 4 months |
| Conservative | Nancy Astor (Note: Also served as a Member of the House of Lords.) | Plymouth Sutton | 1919 | 1945 | 25 years, 6 months | 25 years, 6 months |
| Labour | Margaret Beckett | Lincoln (1974–1979); Derby South (1983–2024) | 1974; 1983 | 1979; 2024 | 40 years, 11 months | 45 years, 5 months |
| Labour (1973–1992) | Betty Boothroyd | West Bromwich (1973–1974); West Bromwich West (1974–2000) | 1973 | 2000 | 27 years, 4 months | 27 years, 4 months |
| Speaker (1992–2000) | Betty Boothroyd | West Bromwich (1973–1974); West Bromwich West (1974–2000) | 1973 | 2000 | 27 years, 4 months | 27 years, 4 months |
| Labour | Karen Buck | Regent's Park and Kensington North (1997–2010); Westminster North (2010–2024) | 1997 | 2024 | 27 years | 27 years |
| Labour | Barbara Castle | Blackburn East (1950–1955); Blackburn (1955–1979) | 1945 | 1979 | 33 years, 9 months | 33 years, 9 months |
| Labour | Ann Clwyd | Cynon Valley | 1984 | 2019 | 35 years, 6 months | 35 years, 6 months |
| Labour (1992–2019) | Ann Coffey | Stockport | 1992 | 2019 | 27 years, 6 months | 27 years, 6 months |
| Change UK (2019) | Ann Coffey | Stockport | 1992 | 2019 | 27 years, 6 months | 27 years, 6 months |
| Labour | Yvette Cooper | Pontefract and Castleford (1997–2010); Normanton, Pontefract and Castleford (2010–2024); Pontefract, Castleford and Knottingley (2024–present) | 1997 | present | 29 years, 5 months | 29 years, 5 months |
| Labour | Freda Corbet | Camberwell North West (1945–1950); Peckham (1950–1974) | 1945 | 1974 | 28 years, 7 months | 28 years, 7 months |
| Labour | Gwyneth Dunwoody | Exeter (1966–1970); Crewe (1974–1983); Crewe and Nantwich (1983–2008) | 1966; 1974 | 1970; 2008 | 34 years, 1 month | 38 years, 3 months |
| Labour | Angela Eagle | Wallasey | 1992 | present | 34 years, 6 months | 34 years, 6 months |
| Labour | Maria Eagle | Liverpool Garston (1997–2010); Garston and Halewood (2010–2024); Liverpool Garston (2024–present) | 1997 | present | 29 years, 5 months | 29 years, 5 months |
| Conservative | Janet Fookes | Merton and Morden (1970–1974); Plymouth Drake (1974–1997) | 1970 | 1997 | 26 years, 9 months | 26 years, 9 months |
| Conservative | Cheryl Gillan | Chesham and Amersham | 1992 | 2021 | 28 years, 11 months | 28 years, 11 months |
| Labour | Harriet Harman | Peckham (1982–1997); Camberwell and Peckham (1997–2024) | 1982 | 2024 | 41 years, 7 months | 41 years, 7 months |
| Labour | Judith Hart | Lanark (1959–1983); Clydesdale (1983–1987) | 1959 | 1987 | 27 years, 7 months | 27 years, 7 months |
| Labour | Margaret Hodge | Barking | 1994 | 2024 | 29 years, 11 months | 29 years, 11 months |
| Labour | Kate Hoey | Vauxhall | 1989 | 2019 | 30 years, 4 months | 30 years, 4 months |
| Conservative | Elaine Kellett-Bowman | Lancaster | 1970 | 1997 | 26 years, 9 months | 26 years, 9 months |
| Conservative | Jill Knight | Birmingham Edgbaston | 1966 | 1997 | 31 years | 31 years |
| Conservative | Eleanor Laing | Epping Forest | 1997 | 2024 | 27 years | 27 years |
| Labour | Jennie Lee | North Lanarkshire (1929–1931); Cannock (1945–1970) | 1929; 1945 | 1931; 1970 | 24 years, 10 months | 27 years, 6 months |
| Labour | Joan Lestor | Eton and Slough (1966–1983); Eccles (1987–1997) | 1966; 1987 | 1983; 1997 | 17 years, 1 month | 26 years, 11 months |
| Liberal (1929–1931, 1935–1951) | Megan Lloyd George | Anglesey (1929–1951); Carmarthen (1957–1966) | 1929; 1957 | 1951; 1966 | 22 years, 4 months | 31 years, 6 months |
| Ind. Liberal (1931–1935) | Megan Lloyd George | Anglesey (1929–1951); Carmarthen (1957–1966) | 1929; 1957 | 1951; 1966 | 22 years, 4 months | 31 years, 6 months |
| Labour (1957–1966) | Megan Lloyd George | Anglesey (1929–1951); Carmarthen (1957–1966) | 1929; 1957 | 1951; 1966 | 22 years, 4 months | 31 years, 6 months |
| Conservative | Theresa May | Maidenhead | 1997 | 2024 | 27 years | 27 years |
| Labour | Siobhain McDonagh | Mitcham and Morden | 1997 | present | 29 years, 5 months | 29 years, 5 months |
| Labour | Dawn Primarolo | Bristol South | 1987 | 2015 | 27 years, 9 months | 27 years, 9 months |
| Labour | Joan Ruddock | Lewisham Deptford | 1987 | 2015 | 27 years, 9 months | 27 years, 9 months |
| Labour (1983–2006) | Clare Short | Birmingham Ladywood | 1983 | 2010 | 26 years, 10 months | 26 years, 10 months |
| Independent (2006–2010) | Clare Short | Birmingham Ladywood | 1983 | 2010 | 26 years, 10 months | 26 years, 10 months |
| Labour | Ann Taylor | Bolton West (1974–1983); Dewsbury (1987–2005) | 1974; 1987 | 1983; 2005 | 17 years, 10 months | 26 years, 5 months |
| Conservative | Margaret Thatcher | Finchley | 1959 | 1992 | 32 years, 5 months | 32 years, 5 months |
| Labour | Joan Walley | Stoke-on-Trent North | 1987 | 2015 | 27 years, 9 months | 27 years, 9 months |
| Conservative | Irene Ward | Wallsend (1931–1945); Tynemouth (1950–1974) | 1931; 1950 | 1945; 1974 | 23 years, 11 months | 37 years, 7 months |
| Conservative | Ann Winterton | Congleton | 1983 | 2010 | 26 years, 10 months | 26 years, 10 months |
| Labour | Rosie Winterton | Doncaster Central | 1997 | 2024 | 27 years | 27 years |

== Current representation ==
As of October 2026, there are 266 female MPs in the House of Commons.

| Political party | Number of MPs | Number of female MPs | Percentage of party's MPs | Percentage of female MPs |
|---|---|---|---|---|
| House of Commons | 650 | 266 | 41% | 100% |
| Labour | 404 | 188 | 46% | 70% |
| Conservative | 118 | 28 | 23% | 11% |
| Liberal Democrats | 71 | 32 | 45% | 12% |
| SNP | 8 | 2 | 25% | <1% |
| Reform | 8 | 2 | 25% | <1% |
| Sinn Féin | 7 | 2 | 29% | <1% |
| Green | 5 | 4 | 80% | 2% |
| DUP | 5 | 1 | 20% | <1% |
| Plaid Cymru | 4 | 3 | 75% | 1% |
| SDLP | 2 | 1 | 50% | <1% |
| Alliance | 1 | 1 | 100% | <1% |
| TUV | 1 | 0 | 0% | 0% |
| UUP | 1 | 0 | 0% | 0% |
| Your Party | 2 | 1 | 50% | <1% |
| Restore | 1 | 0 | 0% | 0% |
| Independent | 11 | 1 | 9% | <1% |
| Speaker | 1 | 0 | 0% | 0% |

In February 2018 the Electoral Reform Society reported that hundreds of seats were being effectively 'reserved' by men, holding back women's representation. Their report states that 170 seats have been held by men first elected in 2005 or before – with few opportunities for women to take those seats or selections. Broadly speaking, the longer an MP has been in Parliament, the more likely they are to be male.

Winner's gender by number of MPs
| MP for this seat since: | Total | Female | Male | % F | % M |
|---|---|---|---|---|---|
| 2001 or before | 143 | 21 | 122 | 14.7% | 85.3% |
| 2005 or before | 212 | 42 | 170 | 19.8% | 80.2% |
| 2010 or before | 380 | 93 | 287 | 24.5% | 75.5% |
| 2015 or before | 545 | 167 | 378 | 30.6% | 69.4% |
| 2018 or before | 650 | 208 | 442 | 32.0% | 68.0% |
| 2019 (all MPs) | 650 | 220 | 430 | 33.9% | 66.1% |
| 2024 or before | 650 | 263 | 387 | 40.5% | 59.5% |

=== Current female Cabinet members (Labour Party) ===
- Angela Rayner – Secretary of State for Housing, Communities and Local Government
- Lucy Powell – Secretary of State for Education
- Lisa Nandy – Secretary of State for Digital, Culture, Media and Sport
- Yvette Cooper – Secretary of State for Health and Social Care
- Shabana Mahmood – Secretary of State for the Home Department
- The Baroness Smith of Basildon – Leader of the House of Lords and Lord Privy Seal
- Heidi Alexander – Secretary of State for Transport
- Louise Haigh – First Secretary of State and Chancellor of the Duchy of Lancaster
- Angela Eagle – Secretary of State for Environment, Food and Rural Affairs
- Miatta Fahnbulleh – Secretary of State for Energy Security and Net Zero
- Anneliese Midgley – Parliamentary Secretary to the Treasury

== Historic representation ==
=== 2024 election ===
==== Female Cabinet members appointed after the 2024 election ====
- Rachel Reeves – Chancellor of the Exchequer
- Bridget Phillipson – Secretary of State for Education
- Liz Kendall – Secretary of State for Science, Innovation and Technology
- Emma Reynolds – Secretary of State for Environment, Food and Rural Affairs
- Jo Stevens – Secretary of State for Wales

=== 2019 election ===
In the 2019 general election, 220 women were elected, making up 34% of the House of Commons, up from 208 and 32% before the election.

As elected in the 2019 general election
| Political party | Number of MPs | Number of female MPs | Percentage of party's MPs | Percentage of female MPs |
|---|---|---|---|---|
| House of Commons | 650 | 220 | 34% | 100% |
| Conservative | 365 | 87 | 24% | 40% |
| Labour | 202 | 104 | 51% | 47% |
| SNP | 48 | 16 | 33% | 7% |
| Liberal Democrats | 11 | 7 | 64% | 3% |
| DUP | 8 | 1 | 13% | <1% |
| Sinn Féin | 7 | 2 | 29% | <1% |
| Plaid Cymru | 4 | 1 | 25% | <1% |
| SDLP | 2 | 1 | 50% | <1% |
| Alliance | 1 | 0 | 0% | 0% |
| Green | 1 | 1 | 100% | <1% |
| Speaker | 1 | 0 | 0% | 0% |

==== Female Cabinet members appointed after the 2019 election ====
- Suella Braverman (Note: On leave from 2 March to 10 September 2021) - Attorney General for England and Wales (2020–22) (Note: Attended Cabinet meetings, but not official Cabinet minister)/Secretary of State for the Home Department (2022, 2022–23)
- Thérèse Coffey – Secretary of State for Work and Pensions (2019–22)/Health and Social Care & Deputy Prime Minister (2022)/Environment, Food and Rural Affairs (2022–23)
- Michelle Donelan – Secretary of State for Education (2022)/Digital, Culture, Media and Sport (2022–23)/Science, Innovation and Technology (Note: On leave from 28 April to 20 July 2023.) (2023–24)
- Nadine Dorries – Secretary of State for Digital, Culture, Media and Sport
- Baroness Evans of Bowes Park – Leader of the House of Lords
- Amanda Milling – Minister Without Portfolio
- Priti Patel – Secretary of State for the Home Department (2019–22)
- Chloe Smith – Secretary of State for Work and Pensions (2022)/Science, Innovation and Technology (2023)
- Anne-Marie Trevelyan – Secretary of State for International Development (2020)/International Trade and President of the Board of Trade (2021–22)/Transport (2022)
- Liz Truss – Secretary of State for Foreign, Commonwealth and Developmental Affairs (2021–22)/Prime Minister (2022)
- Kemi Badenoch – Secretary of State for International Trade (2022–23)/Business and Trade (2023–24)/President of the Board of Trade
- Gillian Keegan – Secretary of State for Education
- Penny Mordaunt – Leader of the House of Commons/Lord President of the Council
- Lucy Frazer – Secretary of State for Culture, Media and Sport
- Claire Coutinho – Secretary of State for Energy Security and Net Zero (2023–24)
- Victoria Atkins – Secretary of State for Health and Social Care (2023–24)

=== 2017 election ===
In the 2017 general election, 208 women were elected, making up 32% of the House of Commons, up from 191 and 29% before the election.

As elected in the 2017 general election
| Political party | Number of MPs | Number of female MPs | Percentage of party's MPs | Percentage of female MPs |
|---|---|---|---|---|
| House of Commons | 650 | 208 | 32% | 100% |
| Conservative | 317 | 67 | 21% | 32% |
| Labour | 262 | 119 | 45% | 57% |
| SNP | 35 | 12 | 34% | 6% |
| Liberal Democrats | 12 | 4 | 33% | 2% |
| DUP | 10 | 1 | 10% | <1% |
| Sinn Féin | 7 | 2 | 29% | <1% |
| Plaid Cymru | 4 | 1 | 25% | <1% |
| Green | 1 | 1 | 100% | <1% |
| Independent | 1 | 1 | 100% | <1% |
| Speaker | 1 | 0 | 0% | 0% |

==== Female Cabinet members appointed after the 2017 election ====
- Theresa May – Prime Minister
- Liz Truss – Secretary of State for International Trade/President of the Board of Trade
- Thérèse Coffey – Secretary of State for Work and Pensions (2019)
- Baroness Evans of Bowes Park – Leader of the House of Lords
- Penny Mordaunt – Secretary of State for Defence
- Karen Bradley – Secretary of State for Northern Ireland
- Andrea Leadsom – Secretary of State for Business, Energy and Industrial Strategy
- Priti Patel – Secretary of State for the Home Department
- Theresa Villiers – Secretary of State for Environment, Food and Rural Affairs
- Nicky Morgan – Secretary of State for Digital, Culture, Media and Sport
- Esther McVey – Secretary of State for Work and Pensions (2018)
- Amber Rudd – Secretary of State for Work and Pensions (2018–19)

=== 2015 election ===
In the 2015 general election, 191 women were elected, making up 29% of the House of Commons, up from 141 and 23% before the election.

| Political party | Number of MPs | Number of female MPs | Percentage of party's MPs | Percentage of female MPs |
|---|---|---|---|---|
| House of Commons | 650 | 191 | 29% | 100% |
| Conservative | 330 | 68 | 21% | 36% |
| Labour | 232 | 99 | 43% | 52% |
| SNP | 56 | 20 | 36% | 10% |
| Liberal Democrats | 8 | 0 | 0% | 0% |
| DUP | 8 | 0 | 0% | 0% |
| Sinn Féin | 4 | 0 | 0% | 0% |
| Plaid Cymru | 3 | 1 | 33% | <1% |
| SDLP | 3 | 1 | 33% | <1% |
| UUP | 2 | 0 | 0% | 0% |
| UKIP | 1 | 0 | 0% | 0% |
| Green | 1 | 1 | 100% | <1% |
| Independent | 1 | 1 | 100% | <1% |
| Speaker | 1 | 0 | 0% | 0% |

==== Female Cabinet members appointed after the 2015 election ====
- Theresa May – Secretary of State for the Home Department
- Justine Greening – Secretary of State for International Development
- Nicky Morgan – Secretary of State for Education and Minister for Women and Equalities
- Baroness Stowell of Beeston – Leader of the House of Lords
- Theresa Villiers – Secretary of State for Northern Ireland
- Liz Truss – Secretary of State for Environment, Food and Rural Affairs (2014–16)/Justice (2016–17)
- Amber Rudd – Secretary of State for Energy and Climate Change

=== 2010 election ===
As elected in the 2010 general election.

| Political party | Number of MPs | Number of female MPs | Percentage of party's MPs | Percentage of female MPs |
|---|---|---|---|---|
| House of Commons | 650 | 143 | 22% | 100% |
| Conservative | 306 | 49 | 16% | 34% |
| Labour | 258 | 81 | 31% | 57% |
| Liberal Democrats | 57 | 7 | 12% | 5% |
| DUP | 8 | 0 | 0% | 0% |
| SNP | 6 | 1 | 17% | 0.7% |
| Sinn Féin | 5 | 1 | 20% | 0.7% |
| Plaid Cymru | 3 | 0 | 0% | 0% |
| SDLP | 3 | 1 | 33% | 0.7% |
| Alliance | 1 | 1 | 100% | 0.7% |
| Green | 1 | 1 | 100% | 0.7% |
| Independent | 1 | 1 | 100% | <1% |
| Speaker | 1 | 0 | 0% | 0% |

==== Female Cabinet members appointed after the 2010 election ====
- Theresa May – Secretary of State for the Home Department
- Caroline Spelman – Secretary of State for Environment, Food and Rural Affairs
- Cheryl Gillan – Secretary of State for Wales
- Baroness Warsi – Minister without Portfolio

A total of 46 female ministers have held Cabinet positions since the first, Margaret Bondfield, in 1929. Tony Blair's 1997 Cabinet had five women and was the first to include more than two female ministers at one time. The highest number of concurrent women Cabinet ministers under Tony Blair was eight (36 per cent), then a record from May 2006 to May 2007. Other women have attended Cabinet without being full members, including Caroline Flint, Anna Soubry and Caroline Nokes. Some who have attended Cabinet have subsequently, or previously been full Cabinet ministers, including Tessa Jowell, Liz Truss and Andrea Leadsom.

Women Cabinet ministers 1929–present
| Period | Name (Party) | Image |
|---|---|---|
| 1929–31 | Margaret Bondfield (Lab) | |
| 1945–47 | Ellen Wilkinson (Lab) | |
| 1953–54 | Florence Horsbrugh (Con) | |
| 1964–70/74–76 | Barbara Castle (Lab) | |
| 1968–69 | Judith Hart (Lab) | |
| 1970–74/79–90 | Margaret Thatcher (Con) | |
| 1974–79 | Shirley Williams (Lab) | |
| 1982–83 | Baroness Young (Con) | |
| 1992–97 | Gillian Shephard (Con) | |
| 1992–97 | Virginia Bottomley (Con) | |
| 1997–2007 (attended Cabinet 2008–09) | Margaret Beckett (Lab) | |
| 1997–2001 | Ann Taylor (Lab) | |
| 1997–98/2007–10 | Harriet Harman (Lab) | |
| 1997–2001 | Mo Mowlam (Lab) | |
| 1997–2003 | Clare Short (Lab) | |
| 1998–2001 | Baroness Jay of Paddington (Lab) | |
| 2001–03 | Helen Liddell (Lab) | |
| 2001–02 | Estelle Morris (Lab) | |
| 2001–07 | Hilary Armstrong (Lab) | |
| 2001–07 | Patricia Hewitt (Lab) | |
| 2001–07/09–10 (attended Cabinet 2007–09) | Tessa Jowell (Lab) | |
| 2003–07 | Baroness Amos (Lab) | |
| 2004–08 | Ruth Kelly (Lab) | |
| 2006–09 | Hazel Blears (Lab) | |
| 2006–09 | Jacqui Smith (Lab) | |
| 2007–08 | Baroness Ashton of Upholland (Lab) | |
| 2008–10/24– | Yvette Cooper (Lab) | |
| 2008–10 | Baroness Royall of Blaisdon (Lab) | |
| 2010–12 | Caroline Spelman (Con) | |
| 2010–12 | Cheryl Gillan (Con) | |
| 2010–12 | Baroness Warsi (Con) | |
| 2010–19 | Theresa May (Con) | |
| 2011–18 | Justine Greening (Con) | |
| 2012–14 | Maria Miller (Con) | |
| 2012–16/19–20 | Theresa Villiers (Con) | |
| 2014–16 (as Nicky Morgan)/19–20 | Baroness Morgan of Cotes (Con) | |
| 2014–17/19–22 (attended Cabinet 2017–19) | Liz Truss (Con) | |
| 2014–16 | Baroness Stowell of Beeston (Con) | |
| 2015–18/18–19 | Amber Rudd (Con) | |
| 2016–22 | Baroness Evans of Bowes Park (Con) | |
| 2016–19 | Karen Bradley (Con) | |
| 2016–17/19–20 (attended Cabinet 2017–19) | Andrea Leadsom (Con) | |
| 2016–17/19–22 | Priti Patel (Con) | |
| 2017–19/22–24 | Penny Mordaunt (Con) | |
| 2018/19 (attended Cabinet 2019–20/23–24) | Esther McVey (Con) | |
| 2019–24 | Thérèse Coffey (Con) | |
| 2020/21–22 | Anne-Marie Trevelyan (Con) | |
| 2021–22 | Nadine Dorries (Con) | |
| 2022–24 (attended Cabinet 2021–22) | Michelle Donelan (Con) | |
| 2022–24 | Kemi Badenoch (Con) | |
| 2022/22–23 (attended Cabinet 2020–21/21–22) | Suella Braverman (Con) | |
| 2022–24 | Gillian Keegan (Con) | |
| 2022/23 | Chloe Smith (Con) | |
| 2023–24 | Lucy Frazer (Con) | |
| 2023–24 | Claire Coutinho (Con) | |
| 2023–24 | Victoria Atkins (Con) | |
| 2024– | Heidi Alexander (Lab) | |
| 2024, 2026– | Louise Haigh (Lab) | |
| 2024–26 | Liz Kendall (Lab) | |
| 2024– | Shabana Mahmood (Lab) | |
| 2024– | Lisa Nandy (Lab) | |
| 2024–26 | Bridget Phillipson (Lab) | |
| 2024–25, 2026– | Lucy Powell (Lab) | |
| 2024–25, 2026– | Angela Rayner (Lab) | |
| 2024–26 | Rachel Reeves (Lab) | |
| 2024– | Baroness Smith of Basildon (Lab) | |
| 2024–26 | Jo Stevens (Lab) | |
| 2025–26 | Emma Reynolds (Lab) | |
| 2026– | Angela Eagle (Lab) | |
| 2026– | Miatta Fahnbulleh (Lab) | |
| 2025–26 | Anneliese Midgley (Lab) | |

Women junior ministers in the Cabinet
| Period | Name (Party) | Image |
|---|---|---|
| 1968–69 | Judith Hart (Lab) | |
| 2007–09 | Caroline Flint (Lab) | |
| 2007–09 | Beverley Hughes (Lab) | |
| 2007–10 | Baroness Scotland of Asthal (Lab) | |
| 2009–10 | Dawn Primarolo (Lab) | |
| 2009–10 | Rosie Winterton (Lab) | |
| 2014–16 | Baroness Anelay of St Johns (Con) | |
| 2015–16 | Anna Soubry (Con) | |
| 2018–19 | Caroline Nokes (Con) | |
| 2018–19 | Claire Perry (Con) | |
| 2020–21 | Amanda Milling (Con) | |
| 2022 | Vicky Ford (Con) | |
| 2022 | Wendy Morton (Con) | |
| 2022–24 | Victoria Prentis (Con) | |
| 2023–24 | Laura Trott (Con) | |
| 2024–25 | Anneliese Dodds (Lab) | |
| 2024–25, 2026– | Ellie Reeves (Lab) | |
| 2025–26 | Anna Turley (Lab; unpaid) | |
| 2025–26 | Baroness Chapman of Darlington (Lab) | |
| 2026– | Emma Reynolds (Lab) | |

=== All-women shortlists ===
All-women shortlists are a method of affirmative action which has been used by the Labour Party to increase the representation of women in Parliament. As of 2015, 117 Labour MPs have been elected to the House of Commons after being selected as candidates through an all-women shortlist. In 2002 this method of selection was ruled to breach the Sex Discrimination Act 1975. In response to this ruling the Sex Discrimination (Election Candidates) Act 2002 legalised all-women short lists as a method of selection. The Equality Act 2010 extends this exemption from discrimination law to 2030.

Ahead of the 2024 general election, HuffPost reported in March 2022 that Labour stopped using all-women shortlists, citing legal advice that continuing to use them for choosing parliamentary candidates would become an "unlawful" practice again under the Equality Act.

== See also ==
- Blair Babe
- Election results of women in United Kingdom general elections (1918–1945)
- Lists of female political office-holders in the United Kingdom
  - List of female cabinet members of the United Kingdom
  - List of female members of the Parliament of the United Kingdom
- Timeline of female MPs in the House of Commons
- Widow's succession
- European countries by percentage of women in national parliaments
- Women in positions of power
- Critical mass (gender politics)
- Women Political Leaders
- Women in government
- Women in the House of Lords
  - List of female members of the House of Lords
- Women's suffrage in the United Kingdom
