= Women in the House of Lords =

The first women in the House of Lords took their seats in 1958, forty years after women were granted the right to stand as MPs in the House of Commons. These were life peeresses appointed by the Prime Minister, although countesses had appeared in medieval times.

Female hereditary peers were able to sit in the Lords from 1963. Female Church of England bishops have been sitting as Lords Spiritual since 2015, although abbesses had appeared in medieval times.

As of December 2022, women make up about 29 per cent of the members of the Lords, which compares with about 35 per cent of the members of the Commons.

== History ==
The exclusion of women from Parliament is relatively modern. Thornhagh Gurdon, in his "Antiquities of Parliament," says that "ladies of birth and quality sat in council with the Saxon Witas". In Wighfred's great council at Becconfeld in A.D. 694, abbesses sat and deliberated. Five of them signed decrees of that council along with the king, bishops, and nobles.

During the reigns of Henry III and Edward I, four abbesses, were summoned to Parliament. These were the abbesses of Shaftesbury, Barking, Winchester, and Wilton.

In a ceremony borrowed from Marguerite of Angouleme's creation as Duke of Berry in 1527, King Henry VIII made Anne Boleyn Marquess of Pembroke in her own right. This entitled her to sit in the House of Lords.

== Countesses ==
When a peer had no sons, but only daughters, they were co-heiresses, and could be countesses in their own right. In the 35th year of Edward III's reign countesses were summoned to Parliament by writ: Mary, Countess of Norfolk; Eleanor de Bohun, Countess of Ormonde; Anne, Lady de Spenser; Phillippe, Countess of March; Joanna, Lady Fitzwalter; Agneta and Mary, Countesses of Pembroke; Margaret, Lady de Roos; Matilda, Countess of Oxford; and Catherine, Countess of Athol. Although peerages had long been created for and inherited by women, peeresses were later excluded from the House of Lords.

== Female witness ==
The very first woman, in modern times, to address the House of Lords was a witness, not a peer: Mrs Elizabeth Robinson (née Hastings; 1695–1779) from Gibraltar, gave evidence and testimony about slave trafficking.

== Viscountess Rhondda's Claim ==
David Alfred Thomas, 1st Viscount Rhondda had been granted his viscountcy with a special remainder which enabled it to be inherited by his daughter Margaret Haig Thomas, a noted suffragette. When he died on 3 July 1918 she therefore inherited his title. Following the passage of the Sex Disqualification (Removal) Act 1919, which allowed women to exercise "any public office", she sought to take her seat in the House of Lords. After initially being accepted, the Committee of Privileges membership was altered and her request was rejected.

== Life peeresses ==
The Life Peerages Act 1958 made possible the creation of peerages for life, in order to address the declining number of active members. Women were immediately eligible and (shortly after the death of Viscountess Rhondda) four were among the first life peers appointed, including Baroness Wootton of Abinger, who was the first woman to be appointed, and Baroness Swanborough, who was the first to take her seat. However, hereditary peeresses continued to be excluded until the passage of the Peerage Act 1963; the first to take her seat was Baroness Strange of Knokin.

The first female chief whip was Baroness Llewelyn-Davies of Hastoe in 1973. Janet Young, Baroness Young was the first woman leader of the House of Lords in 1981. Brenda Hale, Baroness Hale of Richmond became the first (and only) female Law Lord in 2004.

From the passage of the House of Lords Act 1999 until the House of Lords Act 2026 hereditary peeresses remained eligible for election to the Upper House. Five were elected in 1999 among the 92 hereditary peers who continued to sit. Of these, three died, and the other two retired in 2014 and 2020. (Margaret of Mar, 31st Countess of Mar was the last remaining female hereditary peer in the Lords when she retired.) All of these were replaced by male hereditary peers in by-elections.

Following a change to the law in 2014 to allow women to be ordained bishops, the Lords Spiritual (Women) Act 2015 was passed, which provides that whenever a vacancy arises among the Lords Spiritual during the ten years following the Act coming into force, the vacancy has to be filled by a woman, if one is eligible. This does not apply to the five bishops who sit by right (one of whom is female, as of 2020).

In 2015, Rachel Treweek, Bishop of Gloucester, became the first woman to sit as a Lord Spiritual due to the Act. As of 2020, five women bishops sit as Lords Spiritual.

== Numbers ==
Progression of the proportion of women in the House of Lords
Year	Women	% of Lords	Total	Ref
2010	164	21%	777	
2013	176	23%	771	
2015	199	24%	826	
2023	228	29%	785	

Compared with the House of Commons, women make up slightly fewer of the total members of the Lords: 220 out of 650 (34 per cent) members of the Commons were women as of October 2020, up from 32 per cent after the 2017 general election.

== See also ==
- List of current members of the House of Lords
- Lists of female political office-holders in the United Kingdom
  - List of female cabinet members of the United Kingdom
  - List of female members of the House of Lords
- List of peerages created for women
- List of peerages inherited by women
- Women in the House of Commons of the United Kingdom
  - List of female members of the Parliament of the United Kingdom
- House of Lords § Government leaders and ministers in the Lords
- European countries by percentage of women in national parliaments
- Women in positions of power
- Critical mass (gender politics)
- Women in Parliaments Global Forum
- Women in government
