= Parliament (Qualification of Women) Act 1918 =

Act of Parliament of the United Kingdom

Parliament (Qualification of Women) Act 1918 (Note: Section 2.)
- Act of Parliament
- Parliament of the United Kingdom
- Long title: An Act to amend the Law with respect to the Capacity of Women to sit in Parliament.
- Citation: 8 & 9 Geo. 5. c. 47
- Introduced by: Lord Robert Cecil (Lords)
- Territorial extent: United Kingdom

Dates
- Royal assent: 21 November 1918
- Commencement: 21 November 1918 (Note: The Acts of Parliament (Commencement) Act 1793.)
- Repealed: Republic of Ireland: 16 May 1983
Other legislation
Repealed by	Republic of Ireland: Statute Law Revision Act 1983

Status: Current legislation

Status
- Republic of Ireland: Repealed

Text of statute as originally enacted

Revised text of statute as amended

Text of the Parliament (Qualification of Women) Act 1918 as in force today (including any amendments) within the United Kingdom, from legislation.gov.uk.

The Parliament (Qualification of Women) Act 1918 (8 & 9 Geo. 5. c. 47) is an act of the Parliament of the United Kingdom. It gave women over 21 the right to stand for election as a Member of Parliament.

At 41 words, it is the shortest UK statute.

== Background ==
The Representation of the People Act 1918 (7 & 8 Geo. 5. c. 64), passed on 6 February 1918, extended the franchise in parliamentary elections, also known as the right to vote, to women aged 30 and over who resided in the constituency or occupied land or premises with a rateable value above £5, or whose husbands did.

In March 1918 Swire Smith, the Liberal MP for Keighley died, causing a by-election on 26 April. There was doubt as to whether women were eligible to stand for parliament. Nina Boyle made known her intention to stand as a candidate for the Women's Freedom League at Keighley and, if refused, to take the matter to the courts for a definitive ruling. After some consideration, the returning officer stated that he was prepared to accept her nomination, thus establishing a precedent for women candidates. However, he ruled her nomination papers invalid on other grounds: one of the signatories to her nomination was not on the electoral roll and another lived outside the constituency. The Law Lords were asked to consider the matter and concluded that the Great Reform Act 1832 had specifically banned women from standing as parliamentary candidates and the Representation of the People Act 1918 had not changed that.

Parliament hurriedly passed the Parliament (Qualification of Women) Act in time to enable women to stand in the general election of December 1918. The act ran to only 27 operative words: "A woman shall not be disqualified by sex or marriage for being elected to or sitting or voting as a Member of the Commons House of Parliament", and is the shortest UK statute.

== Effects ==
In the 14 December 1918 election to the House of Commons, seventeen women candidates stood, among them well-known suffragette Christabel Pankhurst, representing the Women's Party in Smethwick. The only woman elected was the Sinn Féin candidate for Dublin St Patrick's, Constance Markievicz. However, in line with Sinn Féin abstentionist policy, she did not take her seat.

The first woman to take her seat in the House of Commons was Nancy Astor on 1 December 1919. She was elected as a Coalition Conservative MP for Plymouth Sutton on 28 November 1919, taking the seat her husband had vacated.

As Members of Parliament, women also gained the right to become government ministers. The first woman to become a cabinet minister and Privy Council member was Margaret Bondfield who was Minister of Labour in the Second MacDonald ministry (1929–1931).

== Age limits ==
During the debate of the bill, Lord Islington explained the apparent discrepancy that women could sit in Parliament at 21 but could not vote until they were 30:

... the age of thirty, which was prescribed for enfranchisement of women, was made not because women of a younger age were considered less competent to exercise the vote, but rather because the inclusion of women between the ages of twenty-one and thirty might lead to women-voters being in a majority on the Register, and this was considered, too drastic a departure in the realms of constitutional experiment. Therefore the embargo on any woman below the age of thirty was placed in that measure.

In the case of eligibility to Parliament, this age condition is not necessary. The whole question of age, suitability, and competence can safely be left, and should be left, in the hands of the electorate to decide ...

== See also ==
- Election results of women in United Kingdom general elections (1918–1945)
- Women in the House of Commons of the United Kingdom
- Women in the House of Lords — allowed from 1958 (life peers), 1963 (hereditary peers), 2015 (Church of England bishops)
