= Timeline of female MPs in the House of Commons of the United Kingdom =

Female MPs in the House of Commons of the United Kingdom

Female MPs in the House of Commons of the United Kingdom

Female MPs in the House of Commons of the United Kingdom

Female MPs in the House of Commons of the United Kingdom

Female MPs in the House of Commons of the United Kingdom

Female MPs in the House of Commons of the United Kingdom

Female MPs in the House of Commons of the United Kingdom

Female MPs in the House of Commons of the United Kingdom

Female MPs in the House of Commons of the United Kingdom

Female MPs in the House of Commons of the United Kingdom

Female MPs in the House of Commons of the United Kingdom

Female MPs in the House of Commons of the United Kingdom

Female MPs in the House of Commons of the United Kingdom

Female MPs in the House of Commons of the United Kingdom

Female MPs in the House of Commons of the United Kingdom

Female MPs in the House of Commons of the United Kingdom

Female MPs in the House of Commons of the United Kingdom

Female MPs in the House of Commons of the United Kingdom

Female MPs in the House of Commons of the United Kingdom

Female MPs in the House of Commons of the United Kingdom

Female MPs in the House of Commons of the United Kingdom

Female MPs in the House of Commons of the United Kingdom

Female MPs in the House of Commons of the United Kingdom

Female MPs in the House of Commons of the United Kingdom

Female MPs in the House of Commons of the United Kingdom

Female MPs in the House of Commons of the United Kingdom

- Asterisk indicates Sinn Féin MPs who do not take their seats in the Commons.

== See also ==
- Election results of women in United Kingdom general elections (1918–1945)
- List of female members of the House of Commons of the United Kingdom
- Mother of Parliament
- Records of members of parliament of the United Kingdom § Women
- Women in the House of Commons of the United Kingdom
