= Women Political Leaders =

International organization

Women Political Leaders (WPL)
- Formation: 2013; 13 years ago
- Type: Non-profit foundation
- Headquarters: Reykjavík, Iceland
- Region served: International Network
- Founder & President: Silvana Koch-Mehrin
- Website: www.womenpoliticalleaders.org

Women Political Leaders (WPL) is a non-profit foundation that operates as a global network of female political leaders at national level, including the European Parliament, of whom there are currently around 9,000. WPL provides a platform for the exchange of ideas, experiences and best practices between female political leaders who push for positive change for the world.

WPL is an independent, international, charitable and post-partisan foundation established with the purpose of advancing society by building a network between women in Parliaments. The foundation is based in Reykjavik, Iceland.

== History ==
In 2013, Silvana Koch-Mehrin, former vice-president of the European Parliament (2009–2011) and Member of the European Parliament (2004–2014), founded and chaired the Women Political Leaders Global Forum (WPL). The WPL Board is chaired by Hanna Birna Kristjansdottir, former Minister of Interior of Iceland, Mayor of Reykjavík, and President of the Foreign Affairs Committee in the Parliament of Iceland.

Women are a small minority in politics. Today, according to the Inter-Parliamentary Union, almost 80% of parliamentary seats are held by men. In total, globally around 9,000 women are members of national Parliaments. WPL was created with the mission of advancing society by increasing the number and influence of women in political leadership.

== Organisation ==
WPL consists of Members of Parliaments at national levels, including Members of the European Parliament. Organs of WPL are the advisory board, the Administrative Board, the Executive Board and the network of WPL Ambassadors. WPL is also supported by a variety of non-governmental organizations, foundations, institutions and other civil society actors, which are valuable contributions to WPL's mission.

== Activities ==
WPL carries out a broad variety of work to promote women's political participation. This includes hosting global and regional summits, conducting academic research and promoting female leadership with advocacy campaigns. WPL's work is not focused on classical gender policies.

=== Summits ===
Female politicians from around the world convene at the WPL Summits. WPL Summits offer an opportunity for participants to take part in political dialogue that reflect perspectives in many policy areas of today's female decision-makers.

- 2013 WPL Inaugural Summit "Advancing Society" in the European Parliament: On the occasion of 120-year anniversary of the first time women were allowed to vote (in New Zealand), the inaugural Summit took place in Brussels at the European Parliament where around 400 Members of Parliament attended representing 100 countries. Keynote speakers included Portia Simpson-Miller, Prime Minister of Jamaica (2012–2016), Ellen Johnson Sirleaf, President of Liberia and Jóhanna Sigurðardóttir, Prime Minister of Iceland (2009–2013).
- 2014 WPL Summer Summit in Parliament of Rwanda: The 2014 WPL Summer Summit took place at the Parliament of Rwanda with around 200 Members of Parliament from 51 countries. The WPL Summit was part of the 20th Commemoration of the Genocide in Rwanda. With 64% of its Parliamentarians being women, the Rwandan Parliament is the global champion. At this Summit, keynote speakers included Erna Solberg, Prime Minister of Norway, and Paul Kagame, President of the Republic of Rwanda.
- 2015 WPL Summit "New Leadership for Global Challenges" in the African Union Headquarters: The Summit themed "New Leadership for Global Challenges" took place at the African Union Headquarters in Addis Ababa, Ethiopia, on the occasion of the "Year of Women's Empowerment and Development towards Africa's Agenda 2063". At this WPL Summit there were around 400 Members of Parliament in attendance from 90 countries. Keynote speakers included Nkosazana Dlamini Zuma, Chairperson of the African Union, Irina Bokova, Secretary General of UNESCO, Lakshmi Puri, Representing the Secretary General of United Nations, Mari Kiviniemi, OECD Deputy Secretary General and Prime Minister of Finland (2010–2011) and Joyce Banda, President of Malawi (2012–2014).
- 2015 WPL Summit "Make it Happen! Influence and Power of Women in Parliaments" in the Senate of Mexico: The WPL Summit took place at the Senate of Mexico with around 200 Members of Parliament from 60 countries. It marked the 40th anniversary of the First World Conference on Women in Mexico. This meeting took place shortly after the Mexican Constitutional reform (2014) that obliges political parties to respect the principle of gender parity in the composition of candidates' lists for elective office. Keynote speakers included Mexican Foreign Minister, Rebeca Grynspan, Viviane Reding, Member of the European Parliament and Former Vice President of the European Commission (2010–2014) and Laura Chinchilla, Former President of Costa Rica (2010–2014).
- 2016 WPL Summit "Women in Politics: Fast Forward" in the Parliament of Jordan: The WPL Summit occurred in the Jordanian Parliament with around 200 Members of Parliament from 80 countries. This summit was the first of its kind to be held in a Middle East North African (MENA) country. Keynote speakers included Dalia Grybauskaite, President of Lithuania and Chair of the Council of Women World Leaders, Mari Kiviniemi, OECD Deputy Secretary General and Prime Minister of Finland (2010– 2011) and Marie Louise Coleiro Preca, President of Malta (2014–2019).
- 2017 WPL Summit "We can do it!" in Iceland: The WPL Summit 2017 was hosted in cooperation with the Althingi – Iceland's Parliament – and the Government of Iceland in Reykjavík from 28 to 30 November. The high-level conference of 400 female political leaders from around the world took place in collaboration with the Council of Women World Leaders (CWWL), whose chair, President Dalia Grybauskaite of Lithuania, convened CWWL's network of women Prime Ministers and Presidents. Keynote speakers included Dalia Grybauskaite, President of Lithuania and Chair of the CWWL, Kolinda Grabar-Kitarović, President of Croatia, Kersti Kaljulaid, President of Estonia, Amina Mohammed, UN Deputy Secretary General, and Mari Kiviniemi, OECD Deputy Secretary General and Prime Minister of Finland (2010– 2011).
- 2018 WPL Summit "It's about time! 100 Reasons to Act" in Lithuania: The WPL Summit 2018, co-hosted by Seimas, the Parliament of Lithuania, brought female Heads of State and Government, Ministers, and Parliamentarians from all over the world to Vilnius. The WPL Summit 2018 was held under the patronage of Dalia Grybauskaitė, President of the Republic of Lithuania, and in cooperation with the Council of Women World Leaders (CWWL). President Grybauskaitė, also the Chair of CWWL, convened CWWL's network of women Presidents and Prime Ministers. Keynote speakers included Dalia Grybauskaite, President of Lithuania and Chair of the CWWL, Marie Louise Coleiro Preca, President of Malta, and Helen Clark, Prime Minister of New Zealand (1999–2008) and Administrator of the United Nations Development Program (2009–2017).
- 2019 WPL Summit "Taking Actions to Advance Society Through SDGs" in Japan: The WPL Summit 2019, co-hosted by the House of Representatives of Japan, brought together 400 female Heads of Government, Ministers, and Parliamentarians from 87 countries across the world to Tokyo on June 25–27. The conclusions of the first-ever WPL Summit held in the Asia-Pacific region were distilled in the WPL Summit 2019 Outcome Declaration, which was presented to Shinzo Abe, Prime Minister of Japan, in the presence of G20 Leaders during the Leaders' Special Event on Women's Empowerment at the G20 Summit in Osaka on June 29. Key speakers included Shinzo Abe, Prime Minister of Japan, Tedros Adhanom Ghebreyesus, Director-General of the World Health Organization, Phumzile Mlambo-Ngcuka, executive director of UN Women with the rank of Under-Secretary-General of the United Nations, and Helen Clark, Prime Minister of New Zealand (1999–2008) and Administrator of the United Nations Development Program (2009–2017).

== Studies ==
In addition to creating a platform for female parliamentarians, WPL partners with other organizations to launch relevant reports.

=== The Female Political Career ===
The study "The Female Political Career", produced by Yale University and the London School of Economics, is the result of a partnership between the Women Political Leaders Global Forum (WPL), the World Bank and EY. It reflects survey results from male and female parliamentarians across 84 countries, designed to understand the hurdles women face in launching and sustaining successful political careers.

=== Social Media: Advancing Women in Politics? ===
The study "Social Media: Advancing Women in Politics?", produced by Harvard University, is the result of a partnership between the Women Political Leaders Global Forum (WPL), the Shorenstein Center on Media, Politics and Public Policy, and Facebook. It is based on a survey that examined the use of social media by over 900 female Parliamentarians from 107 countries.

== WPL Awards ==
WPL presents a series of Annual WPL Awards to countries outperforming on female political leadership. The awards are based on the rankings of the World Economic Forum's "Global Gender Gap Report" and the Inter Parliamentary Union. WPL also presents the "WPL Award for Lifetime Achievements in Female Political Empowerment".

=== WPL Awards 2013 ===
Winners in the Categories of Political Empowerment:

- Women in Parliament: Rwanda
- Years with Female Head of State: Ireland
- Legislators, Senior Officials and Managers: Jamaica

Winners by Region in Closing the Gender Gap:

- Global Winner in Closing the Gender Gap: Iceland
- Middle East: Israel
- Oceania: New Zealand
- South and Southeast Asia: Philippines
- East Asia: Mongolia
- Africa: Lesotho
- Europe and Central Asia: Iceland
- European Union: Finland
- South America: Bolivia

Achievements in Closing the Gender Gap in the Arab World

- Winner by Region Arab World: United Arab Emirates
- Achievements in increasing the Percentage of Women in Parliamentary Positions: Algeria

=== WPL Awards 2014 ===
"WIP Award for Lifetime Achievements in Female Political Empowerment" Vigdís Finnbogadóttir, received the WIP Award during the WIP Study Trip to Iceland (3–4 April 2014) as the first woman in the world to be democratically elected Head of State.

=== WPL Awards 2015 ===
Winners in the Categories of Political Empowerment:

- Women in Parliament: Sweden and Ecuador
- Ministerial Positions: Italy

Winners in Closing the Gender Gap:

- Global Winner in Closing the Gender Gap: Kenya
- South and South East Asia: Bangladesh

Achievements in Closing the Gender Gap in the Arab World

- Tunisia

=== WPL Awards 2016 ===
"WPL Award for Lifetime Achievements in Female Political Empowerment" Honourable Dr. Nkosazana Dlamini-Zuma received the WPL Award for Lifetime Achievement in Female Political Empowerment during the 3rd African Union High Level Panel on Gender Equality & Women's Empowerment, in Kigali.

WPL Certificates of Recognition 2016 (WIP Global Summit in Jordan, May 2016):

- Winner in the enhancement of women's role in the decision-making process: Jordan
- Winner in advancing Women in Parliamentary Positions: The first female Speaker of Parliament in the Arab world: United Arab Emirates

Winners in Legislative Reform:

- Algeria – for a 50% quota for women on political party lists.
- Morocco – for Equal pay and non-discrimination based on gender, in employment.
- Tunisia – for a 50% quota for women on political party lists
- Iraq – for Introducing a 25% quota for women in the Council of Representatives of Iraq.
- Libya – for Adopting a 16.5% quota for women in the 2014 electoral law, for the House of Representatives of Libya.
- Saudi Arabia – for Women granted the right to vote and stand in the 2015 municipal elections
- Egypt – for Introducing a 10% quota for women in Parliament.
- Oman – for Achieving gender parity in primary and secondary education

== Advocacy campaigns ==
=== WPL Leadership Campaign ===
The campaign "We need more Women in Parliaments and as political leaders because..." aims to highlight the commitment of male Presidents and Prime Ministers around the world to increase the number of women in politics. Over 60 male leaders have supported this campaign including Prime Minister Justin Trudeau, President of the European Council Donald Tusk and President of Columbia Manuel Santos. Prime Minister of Iceland, Sigurður Ingi Jóhannsson, became the co-patron of the WIP Leadership Campaign in August 2016.

=== "Peace and Security" ===
WPL has started a conversation on the importance of including more women in peace processes. Female Parliamentarians from all around the globe, as well as members of the WPL Advisory Board, have contributed to this initiative by sharing their ideas on how to increase the participation of women in conflict resolution, which is one of the strategic objectives of the Beijing Declaration and Platform for Action, which turned 20 years in 2015.

=== Call for Action to Step It Up for Gender Equality ===
Female Parliamentarians attending the 2015 WPL Global Summit "New Leadership for Global Challenges" signed a UN Women call for action that focuses on three specific actions: Renewed political commitment to close remaining gaps and fully implement the 12 critical areas of the Beijing Platform for Action by 2020; the empowerment of women, the realization of human rights of women and girls, and the expiry of gender inequality by 2030; and an end to the funding gap on gender equality, and the matching of commitments with the means of implementation.

== See also ==
- Council of Women World Leaders
- European countries by percentage of women in national parliaments
- Women in government
