= National Association of British and Irish Millers =

nabim (National Association of British and Irish Flour Millers, now UK Flour Millers) is the British trade industry group that represents the flour industry. The UK flour industry is worth over £1bn, producing around 5 million tonnes of wheat flour a year.

== Structure ==
It is headquartered near Green Park tube station and the Royal Academy of Arts near St James's Street in the City of Westminster. Part of the organization is the Flour Advisory Bureau which advises on recipes with flour.

Alexander Waugh was the Director-General of nabim and the Flour Advisory Bureau from 2000-2023. Alistair Gale has been Chief Executive Officer since 2023.

== History ==
The National Association of British and Irish Flour Millers had its inaugural meeting on 27 April 1878 and was incorporated in 1917. The Flour Advisory Bureau was formed in 1956.

nabim was renamed UK Flour Millers in December 2020.

== Function ==
It markets the consumption of wheat flour in the UK.

== See also ==
- Federation of Bakers
- Research Association of British Flour Millers
