= British Baking Industries Research Association =

Baking research organisation in the UK

- Formation: 1944; 82 years ago
- Location: Chorleywood, UK

The British Baking Industries Research Association (BBIRA) was a research organisation that worked to advance baking technology and techniques. In the early 1960s, it developed the Chorleywood bread process.

== History ==
The British Baking Industries Research Association (BBIRA) was created in 1946 at the British government's advocacy as a measure intended to benefit both the British baking industry and British wheat farmers. During 1949, dedicated premises at Chorleywood were officially opened for the Association by Princess Marina, Duchess of Kent. In the early 1950s, the Association had an reported income of roughly £40,000.

The research performed by BBIRA covered various topics and aspects of baking, including the designing of improved apparatus to perform tasks such as production and monitoring (some of these designs secured patents). The Chorleywood bread process, which enables the use of lower-protein wheats and reduces processing time, drastically lowering the cost of bread, was developed by BBIRA employees Bill Collins, George Elton and Norman Chamberlain in 1961. By 2011, 80 percent of bread made in Britain used this process; it has also spread internationally to be widely used in Australia, South Africa, South America, Turkey and France.

For its members, the association maintained library and information departments, including digitally-accessible records. BBIRA also produced guidance to bakeries, from building layout to experimental design and industry-centric legal advice.

The Chorleywood site saw considerable expansion during its operating years, particularly the building of additional laboratories in the west and north wings in 1961. In 1966, BBIRA amalgamated with the Research Association of British Flour Millers (RABFM) to become the Flour Milling and Baking Research Association (FMBRA). While BBIRA as an organisation ceased to exist at this point, activity at Chorleywood continued under FMBRA, which employed in excess of 100 employees by 1970 and undertook further expansion via the construction of a new east wing, which was formally opened by the Katharine, Duchess of Kent in March 1972.
