= Research Association of British Flour Millers =

Milling research organisation in the UK

- Formation: 1923; 103 years ago
- Location: St Albans, UK

The Research Association of British Flour Millers (FMBRA) was a research organisation that worked to advance milling technology and techniques.

== History ==
The Research Association of British Flour Millers (FMBRA) was established in 1923; it was based at St Albans. It received funding both from membership subscriptions and grants from the British government. In the early 1950s, the Association had an reported income of roughly £50,000. In addition to milling, its researchers commonly had experience in starch, sugars and nutrition. During the Second World War, FMBRA was responsible for formulating the ‘National loaf’; it also determined the distribution of Vitamin B across different areas of the wheat grain.

New research facilities were opened by the Association during the early 1960s. In 1966, RABFM merged with the British Baking Industries Research Association (BBIRA) to become the Flour Milling and Baking Research Association (FMBRA). The newly combined Association opted to base itself at BBIRA's Chorleywood premises, which included its expansion the construction of a new east wing; the enlarged site was formally open by the Katharine, Duchess of Kent in March 1972.

== See also ==
- National Association of British and Irish Millers
