= Federation of Bakers =

Industry trade organisation in the UK for large-scale

The Federation of Bakers is the main industry trade organisation in the UK for large-scale (industrial) baking of bread.

== History ==
The equivalent of around 11 million loaves of bread are sold in the UK each day. Large bread baking companies in the UK produce around 80% of bread sold (by value), and around 75% comes from three main companies; in-store bakeries produce around 17%; and craft bakers produce the rest.

The FOB was established in 1942 to help with the rationing of bread, called the National Loaf.

== Function ==
The industry is worth £3.5bn, with around 20,000 employees. There are around 33 main bread bakeries, with nine main companies. The organisation works with the Flour Advisory Bureau.

=== Bread production in the UK ===
By law, British flour must be fortified with calcium, iron, B1, B3, and folic acid. Folic acid and B9 have been added since 2021. 80% of bread in the UK is made with the Chorleywood bread process invented in 1961, which has double the amount of yeast.

== Structure ==
It is headquartered in the London Borough of Camden, between the A400 (to the west) and Southampton Row (A4200, to the east).

== See also ==
- Food Standards Agency, also in Camden borough
- History of bread
- List of British breads
