= Bill Collins (baker) =

British baker (1931–2021)

- Born: 11 July 1931; Bootle, Lancashire, England
- Died: 3 March 2021 (aged 89)
- Education: Holt High School; College of Food and Technology
- Spouses: Joyce Ward (m. 1954; death 1997) Marjorie Arundale (m. 1998)
- Children: 4
- Culinary career
- Awards won: Insignia Award of the City and Guilds of London Institute; Queen Elizabeth II Silver Jubilee Medal

Thomas Hylton "Bill" Collins (11 July 1931 – 3 March 2021) was a British baker who, with George Elton and Norman Chamberlain, developed the Chorleywood bread process at the British Baking Industries Research Association in Chorleywood. He was awarded the Queen Elizabeth II Silver Jubilee Medal in 1978.

== Works ==
- The Creation and Control of Bread Crumb Structure
