= Chorleywood bread process =

Process for commercial bread production

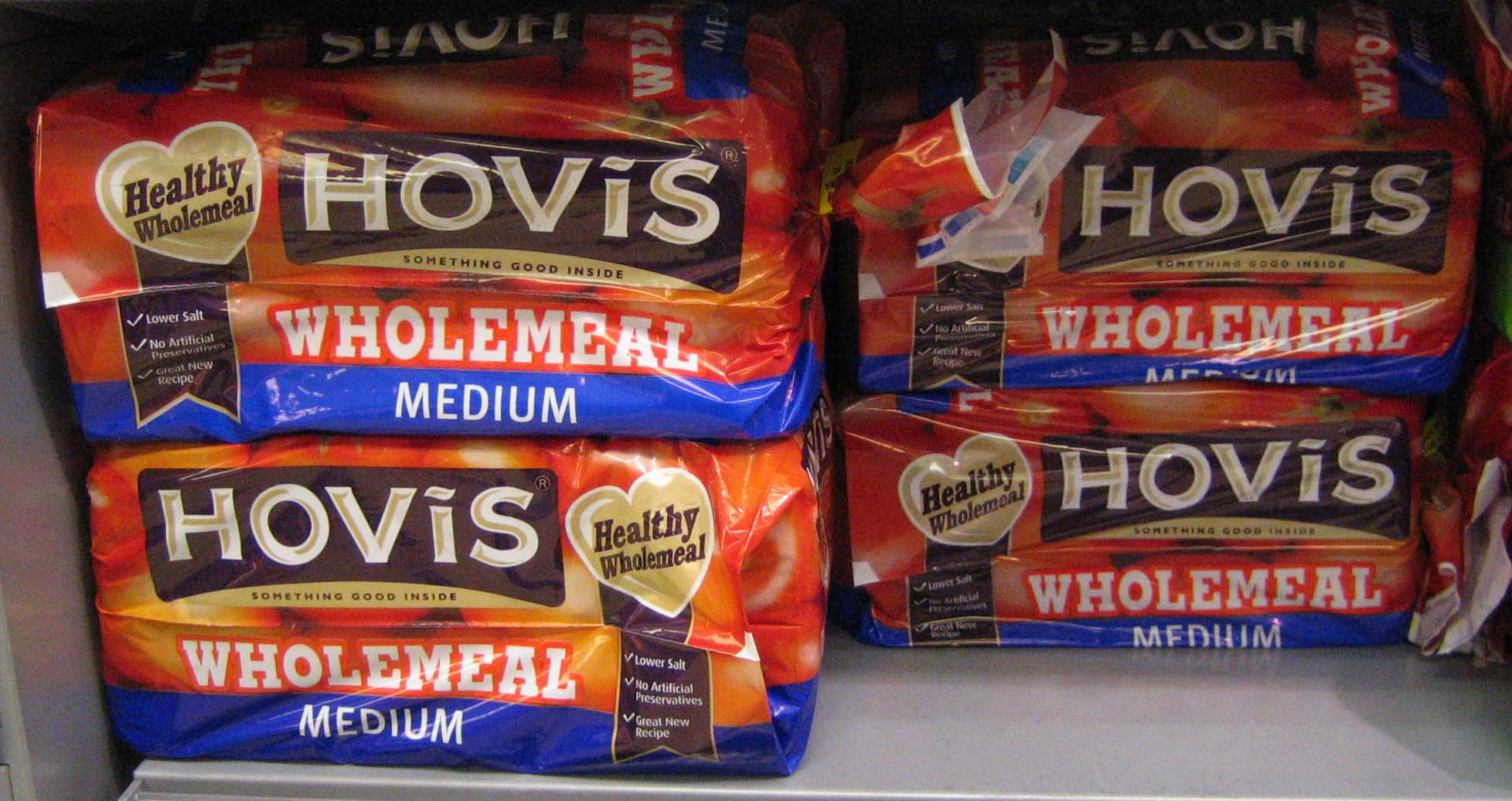
Bread made by the Chorleywood process

The Chorleywood bread process (CBP) is a method of efficient dough production to make yeasted bread quickly, producing a soft, fluffy loaf. Compared to traditional bread-making processes, CBP uses more yeast, various food additives, and high-speed mixing to allow the dough to be made with lower-protein wheat, and produces bread in a shorter time. It was developed by Bill Collins, George Elton and Norman Chamberlain of the British Baking Industries Research Association at Chorleywood in 1961. As of 2009, 80% of bread made in the United Kingdom used the process.

For millennia, bread had been made from wheat flour by manually kneading dough with a raising agent (typically yeast) leaving it to ferment before it was baked. In 1862 a cheaper industrial-scale process was developed by John Dauglish, using water with dissolved carbon dioxide instead of yeast. Dauglish's method, used by the Aerated Bread Company that he set up, dominated commercial bread baking for a century until the yeast-based Chorleywood process was developed.

Some protein is lost during traditional bulk fermentation of bread; this does not occur to the same degree in mechanically developed doughs, allowing CBP to use lower-protein wheat. This feature had an important impact in the United Kingdom where, at the time, few domestic wheat varieties were of sufficient quality to make high-quality bread; the CBP permitted a much greater proportion of lower-protein domestic wheat to be used in the grist.

== Description ==
The Chorleywood bread process allows the use of lower-protein wheats and reduces processing time, the system being able to produce a loaf of bread from flour to sliced and packaged form in about three and a half hours. This is achieved through the addition of vitamin C, fat, yeast, and intense mechanical working by high-speed mixers, not feasible in a small-scale kitchen.

Flour, water, yeast and salt are mixed together, along with a fast-acting oxidizing agent and a small amount of fat. Vitamin C (ascorbic acid) is the usual oxidizing agent; potassium bromate is still used in parts of the US but has been banned in California (effective 2027), the UK, and other countries. The dough is then mechanically mixed for about three minutes. The high-shear mixing generates high temperatures in the dough, which is cooled in some advanced mixers using a cooling jacket. Chilled water or ice may also be used to counteract the temperature rise during high-speed mixing. Air pressure in the mixer headspace can be controlled to keep gas bubbles at the desired size and number. Typical operating regimes are pressure followed by vacuum, and atmospheric followed by vacuum. The pressure control during mixing affects the fineness of crumb texture in the finished bread.

In typical high-volume bread-production, the dough is cut into individual pieces and allowed to "recover" for 5–8 minutes (intermediate proofing). Each piece of dough is then shaped, placed in a baking tin and moved to the humidity- and temperature-controlled proofing chamber, where it sits for about 45–50 minutes. It is then baked for 17–25 minutes at 450 °F (about 230 °C). After baking, the loaves are removed from the baking tin and then go to the cooler, where, about two hours later, they are made ready for dispatch, sliced and packaged if required. In UK-standard bread, the dough piece is "cross-panned" at the moulding stage; this involves cutting the dough piece into four and turning each piece by 90° before placing it in the baking tin. Cross-panned bread appears to have a finer and whiter crumb texture than the elliptical shape of the crumb bubble structure resulting from a different orientation, is easier to slice, and tends to be more resistant to tearing when spreading products such as butter on the surface.

== Impact ==
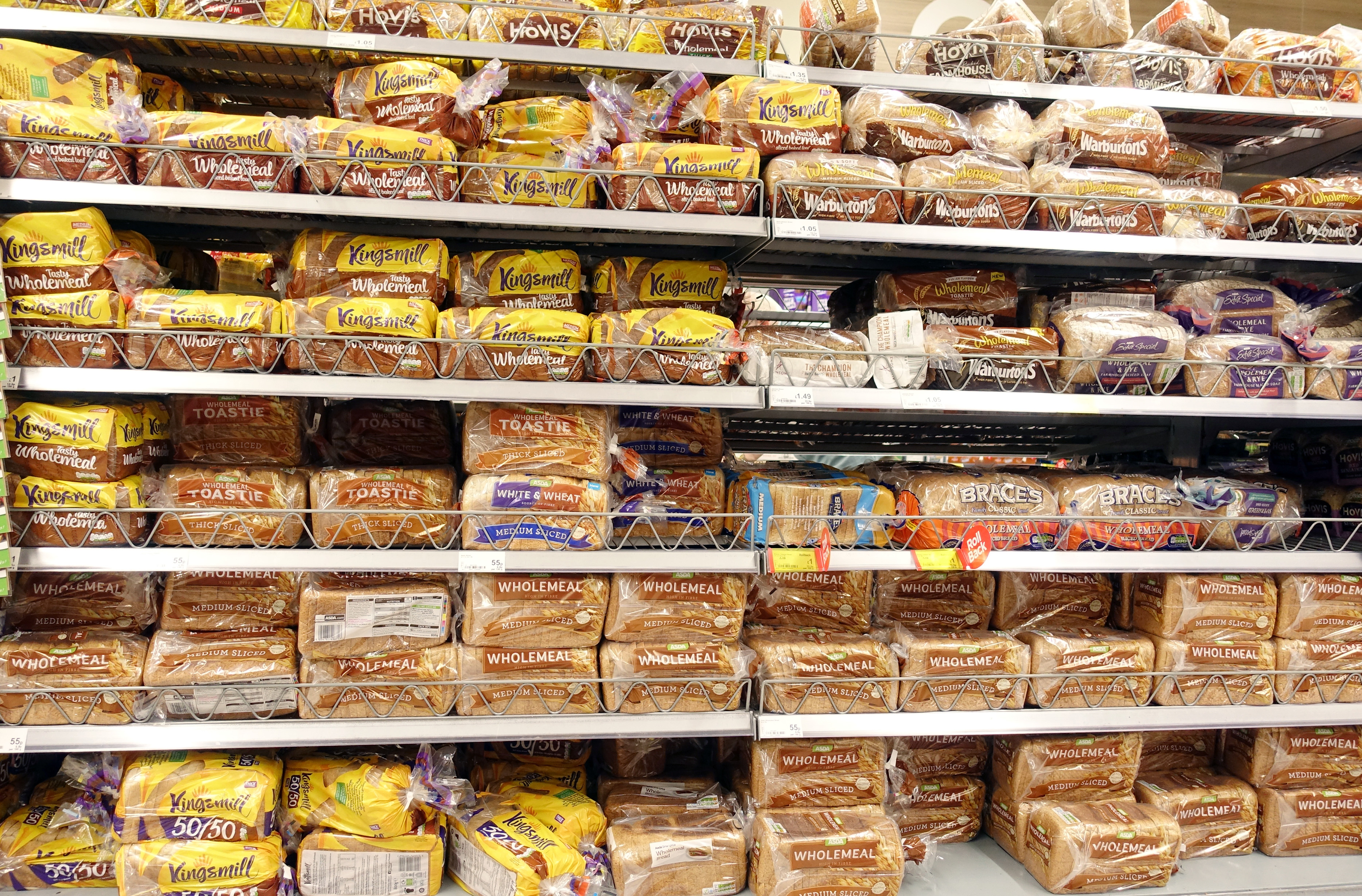
80% of bread in the UK is produced using the Chorleywood process

The process significantly reduced fermentation time and allowed greater use of non-imported wheat, which helped reduce the price of bread. According to a representative of the British Federation of Bakers, "UK bread is around the cheapest in the world."

As of 2011, 80% of bread made in the United Kingdom used the process, which has also spread to other countries such as Australia, South Africa, South America, Turkey and France.

However, there has also been a reaction against the ubiquity of CBP-produced bread, including the formation of a campaign group for "real bread", as opposed to CBP bread.

There has been a significant shift in the UK bread market, characterized by a growing preference for artisan breads over the more common Chorleywood Process white sliced bread loaf. Artisan bakeries have expanded, offering breads that are increasingly popular despite their higher prices. This trend reflects a broader consumer desire for healthier and tastier bread options, even in economic downturns. While white sliced loaf remains popular, its sales have been declining, and the market has diversified with a wide variety of bread types, indicating a move away from the uniformity of Chorleywood Process bread.

Campaigners against the use of the Chorleywood process suggest that CBP bread has detrimental health effects, e.g. with respect to gut health and/or obesity. In the book Not on the Label: What Really Goes Into the Food on Your Plate (2004), Felicity Lawrence wrote that the industrial scale of the Chorleywood Bread Process comes at a nutritional cost, requiring larger amounts of salt and yeast than traditional bread recipes. Andrew Whitley in his book Bread Matters: The State of Modern Bread and a Definitive Guide to Baking Your Own criticises the CBP for the inferior flavour and texture of the bread made in this way. Whitley was also co-author of a study which studied the effects of differently fermented breads on cultures of colonic bacteria. It concluded that "breads fermented by the traditional long fermentation and sourdough [were] less likely to lead to IBS symptoms compared to bread made using the Chorleywood Breadmaking Process".
