= National Loaf =

Bread introduced in Britain during the Second World War

National loaf
- Type: Bread
- Place of origin: Britain
- Main ingredients: Wholemeal flour

The National Loaf was a fortified wholemeal bread, made from wholemeal flour with added calcium and vitamins, introduced in Britain during the Second World War by the Federation of Bakers (FOB), specifically Dr Roland Gordon Booth. Introduced in 1942, the loaf was made from wholemeal flour, known to be more nutritious, and fortified to prevent nutritional deficiencies like rickets.

The UK relied upon food imports, which were disrupted by the Battle of the Atlantic, so more efficient use of limited resources was a major consideration. To that end, National Loaf maximised use of the wheat grain, even including husk.

Working with the government, the FOB published four recipes for wholemeal bread, which became the only recipes that could legally be used to make bread in the U.K. The National Loaf was criticized as grey, mushy and unappetising; only one person in seven preferred it to white bread. The government insisted on it because it saved space in shipping food to Britain and allowed better utilization of existing stocks of wheat.

Eleanor Roosevelt, the American First Lady, visiting Buckingham Palace in 1942, noted that "We were served on gold and silver plates, but our bread was the same kind of war bread every other family had to eat."

In 1953, laws were passed that removed price controls from white flour on the condition that it was fortified with calcium, iron, thiamin, and nicotinic acid, aiming to prevent malnutrition. In 1956, National Loaf ceased being sold.

During the COVID-19 lockdown in the United Kingdom in 2020, many British bakers saw an upsurge of orders and began producing some bread with wholemeal flour, inspired by the National Loaf.

== See also ==
- Rationing in the United Kingdom
- Making of Bread, etc. Act 1800 – a ban on producing flour other than wholemeal flour, soon repealed
- Woolton pie
