= Women in medieval Scotland =

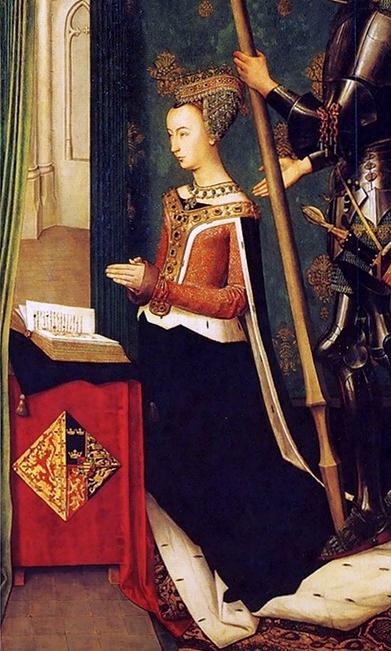
Queen Margaret of Denmark (1456–86), wife of James III

Women in medieval Scotland includes all aspects of the lives and status of women between the departure of the Romans from North Britain in the fifth century to the introduction of the Renaissance and Reformation in the early sixteenth century. Medieval Scotland was a patriarchal society, but how exactly patriarchy worked in practice is difficult to discern. A large proportion of the women for whom biographical details survive were members of the royal houses of Scotland. Some of these became important figures. There was only one reigning Scottish Queen in this period, the uncrowned and short-lived Margaret, Maid of Norway (r. 1286–90).

Some girls of noble families were taught in nunneries. By the end of the fifteenth century, Edinburgh also had schools for girls, sometimes described as "sewing schools". Private tuition in the families of lords and wealthy burghers may have extended to women, but for most women educational opportunities remained extremely limited. Despite this there is evidence of female Gaelic poets. By the Late Middle Ages, Lowland society was probably part of the north-west European marriage model, of life-cycle service, with many young people, both male and female, leaving home to become domestic and agricultural servants, followed by relatively late marriage. Women retained their original surname at marriage and, while many girls from the social elite married in their teens, by the end of the period most in the Lowlands only married after a period of life-cycle service, in their twenties. There was no divorce, but separation from bed and board was allowed in exceptional circumstances.

In the burghs there were probably high proportions of poor households headed by widows, who survived on casual earnings and the profits from selling foodstuffs or ale. Widows of craftsmen sometimes continued in their late husband's crafts. Spinning was an expected part of the daily work of medieval townswomen of all social classes. In crafts, women could sometimes be apprentices, but they could not join guilds in their own right. Scotland had fewer nunneries than male monasteries, but prioresses were figures with considerable authority. There may have been small numbers of anchorites. Mary, mother of Jesus, as the epitome of a wife and mother, was probably an important model for women. Some, usually wives, acting through relatives and husbands as benefactors or property owners connected with local altars and cults of devotion. New cults of devotion connected with Jesus and Mary, mother of Jesus began to reach Scotland in the fifteenth century.

== Status ==
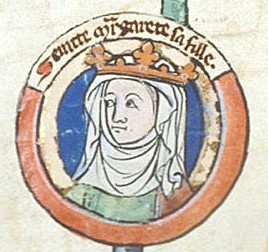
St Margaret of Scotland, the first king's wife to be recorded as "queen", from a later genealogy

Medieval Scotland was a patriarchal society, where authority was invested in men and in which women had a very limited legal status. Daughters were meant to be subservient to their fathers and wives to their husbands, with only widows able to own property and to represent themselves in law. How exactly patriarchy worked in practice is difficult to discern. Literary sources, particularly romantic poems, indicate that women were seen as passive subjects for love and inspiration for the great deeds of knights. They take a more active role in the historical epics like John Barbour's Bruce (c. 1375) and Blind Harry's Wallace (late 1470s). They were also seen as weaker creatures, morally and physically. Considerable emphasis was placed on their chastity, with "whore" being the most common form of abuse, and their conduct was constrained by the informal sanctions of community gossip, should they step outside of the accepted roles of wife or mother.

== Royal women ==
A large proportion of the women for who biographical details survive for the Middle Ages, were members of the royal houses of Scotland, either as princesses or queen consorts. Some of these became important figures in the history of Scotland or gained a significant posthumous reputation. There was only one reigning Scottish Queen in this period, the uncrowned and short-lived Margaret, Maid of Norway (r. 1286–90). The first wife called "queen" in Scottish sources is the Anglo-Saxon and German princess Margaret, the wife of Malcolm III, which may have been a title and status negotiated by her relatives. She was a major political and religious figure within the kingdom, but her status was not automatically passed on to her successors, most of whom did not have the same prominence. Ermengarde de Beaumont, the wife of William I, acted as a mediator, judge in her husband's absence and is the first Scottish queen known to have had her own seal.

== Education ==
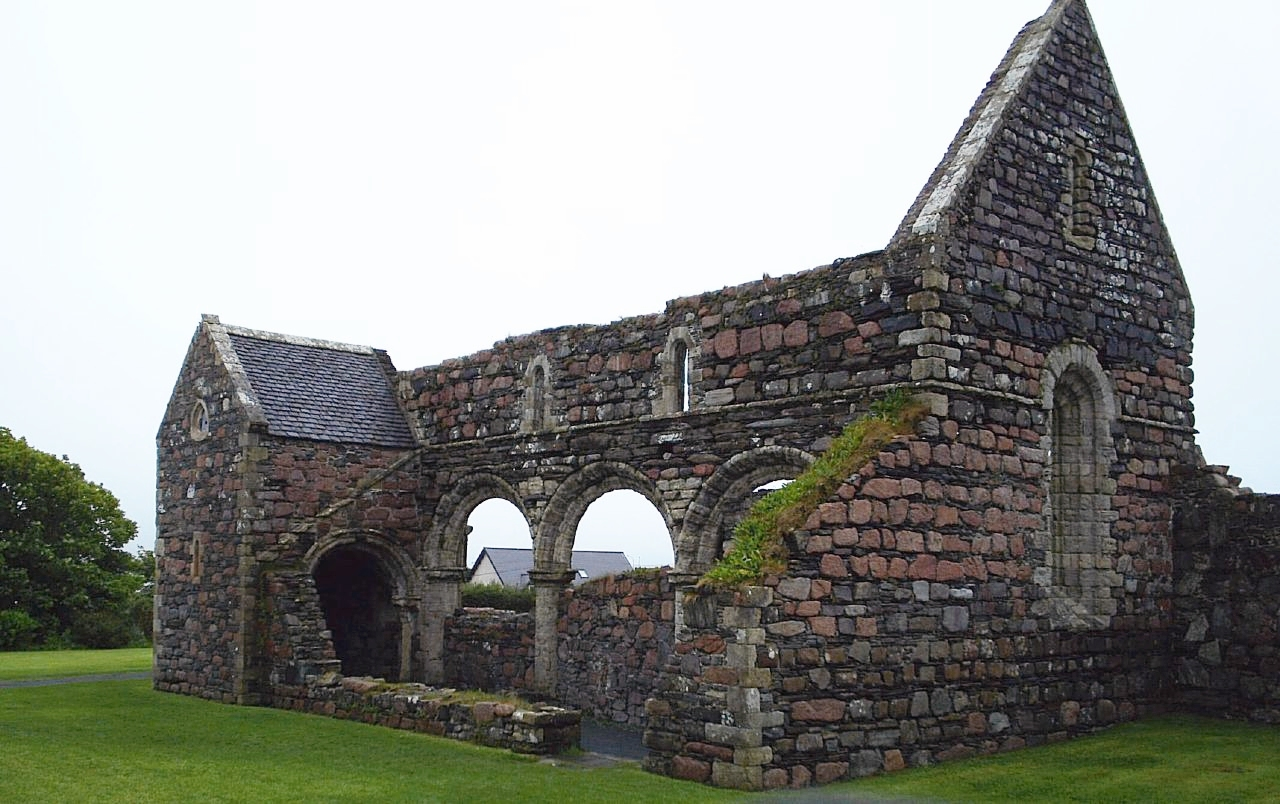
Ruins of the Iona Nunnery

Girls of noble families were sometimes taught in nunneries such as Elcho, Aberdour and Haddington. By the end of the fifteenth century Edinburgh also had schools for girls, sometimes described as "sewing schools", whose name probably indicates one of their major functions, although reading may also have been taught in these schools. The students were probably taught by lay women or nuns. There was also the development of private tuition in the families of lords and wealthy burghers, which may have extended to women, but for most women educational opportunities remained extremely limited. The major corpus of Medieval Scottish Gaelic poetry, The Book of the Dean of Lismore is notable for containing poetry by at least four women. These include Aithbhreac Nighean Coirceadail (f. 1460), who wrote a lament for her husband, the constable of Castle Sween.

== Marriage ==
By the late medieval era, Lowland society was probably part of the north-west European marriage model, of life-cycle service and late marriage, usually in the mid-20s, delayed by the need to acquire the resources needed to be able to form a household. Unlike in England, where kinship was predominately cognatic (derived through both males and females), women retained their original surname at marriage and marriages were intended to create friendship between kin groups, rather than a new bond of kinship. Women could marry from the age of 12 (while for boys it was from 14) and, while many girls from the social elite married in their teens, by the end of the period most in the Lowlands only married after a period of life-cycle service, in their twenties. The extensive marriage bars for kinship meant that most noble marriages necessitated a papal dispensation, which could later be used as grounds for annulment if the marriage proved politically or personally inconvenient, although there was no divorce as such. Separation from bed and board was allowed in exceptional circumstances, usually adultery.

== Work ==
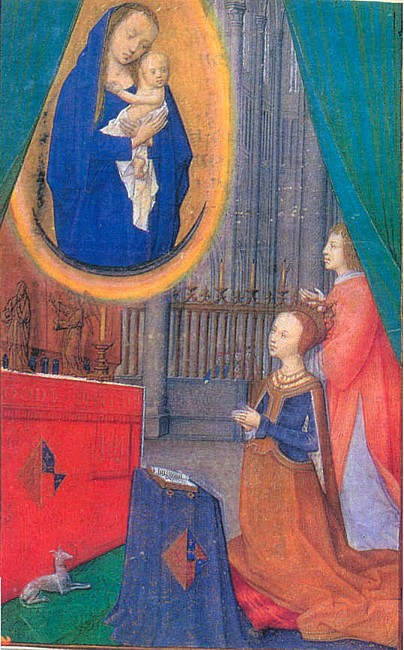
Margaret Tudor, praying before a vision of the Virgin and infant Christ, from Hours of James IV of Scotland, c. 1503

In Lowland rural society, as in England, many young people, both male and female, probably left home to become domestic and agricultural servants, as they can be seen doing in large numbers from the sixteenth century. Some women would have been engaged as wet nurses to the children of noble and wealthy Lowland families and the important role of midwife was also reserved for women. In the burghs there were probably high proportions of poor households headed by widows, who survived on casual earnings and the profits from selling foodstuffs or ale. Spinning was an expected part of the daily work of medieval townswomen of all social classes. In crafts, women could sometimes be apprentices, but they could not join guilds in their own right. However, there are records of many widows continuing in their late husband's craft. Some women worked and traded independently, hiring and training employees, which may have made them attractive as marriage partners.

== Religion ==
Scotland had relatively few nunneries, with 30 identified for the period to 1300, compared with 150 for England, and very few in the Highlands. Prioresses like Anna MacLean (d. 1543) of Iona Nunnery, were figures with considerable authority: appointing lay officers, managing lands and finances as well as the lives of the nuns under them. There may have been small numbers of anchorites, who isolated themselves from society and devoted themselves to God, but they have left very few traces in the records. The Virgin Mary, as the epitome of a wife and mother, was probably an important model for women. There is evidence from late medieval burghs like Perth, of women, usually wives, acting through relatives and husbands as benefactors or property owners connected with local altars and cults of devotion. In Perth there were several altars devoted to aspects of Marian worship in the Parish church of St. John, a chapel dedicated to St. Anne, the mother of Mary, or Lady's Chapel and the Loreto Chapel, dedicated to the Virgin's Holy House. Around the town several monasteries were also dedicated to the Virgin. Queen Margaret became important after her canonisation in 1250 and after the ceremonial transfer of her remains to Dunfermline Abbey, as one of the most revered national saints. New cults of devotion connected with Jesus and the Virgin Mary began to reach Scotland in the fifteenth century, including the Five Wounds, the Holy Blood and the Holy Name of Jesus. There were also new religious feasts, including celebrations of the Presentation, the Visitation and Mary of the Snows.

== See also ==
- Women in early modern Scotland
- Women in the Victorian era
