= Boris Malagurski =

Serbian-Canadian film director (born 1988)

- Борис Малагурски
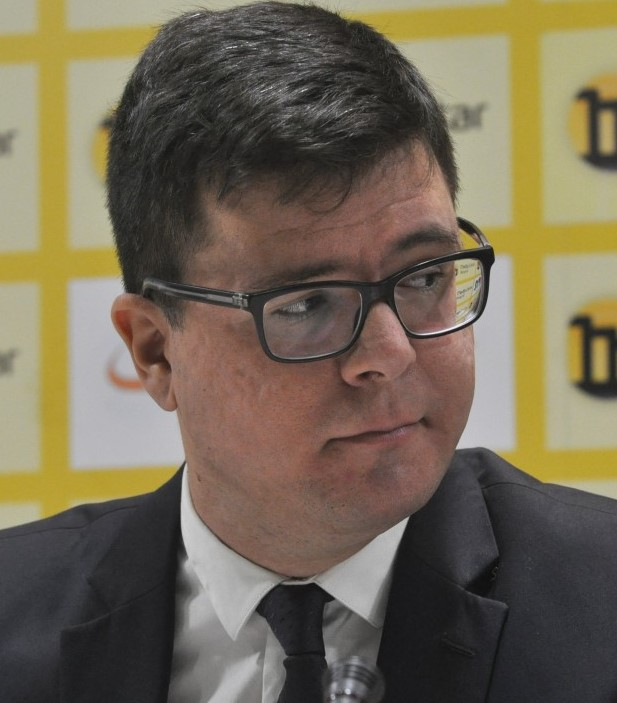
- Malagurski in 2019
- Born: 11 August 1988 (age 38); Subotica, SR Serbia, Yugoslavia
- Citizenship: Canadian; Serbian
- Education: Kitsilano Secondary School; University of British Columbia (BFA); Staffordshire University (MA)
- Occupations: Director; producer; TV host; political commentator; political activist
- Years active: 2005–present
- Spouse: Ivana Malagurski (m. 2015)
- Children: 3

Boris Malagurski (Serbian Cyrillic: Борис Малагурски; born 11 August 1988) is a Serbian and Canadian film director, producer, writer, television host, and activist. His films include the documentary series The Weight of Chains.

== Early life and education ==
Born to Branislav and Slavica Malagurski, he grew up in the northern Serbian town of Subotica. In an interview for Literární noviny, Prague's cultural and political journal, Malagurski said that his last name originates from the Polish town of Mała Góra.

Malagurski emigrated to Canada in 2005 and made a documentary film about his move from Serbia called The Canada Project. Excerpts from the film were shown on Serbian National Television, as a part of Mira Adanja-Polak's TV show. Since then, Malagurski identifies himself as both Serbian and Canadian. While studying Film Production at the University of British Columbia, Malagurski organized protests in Vancouver against Kosovo's declaration of independence and received help from Canadian journalist Scott Taylor and Irish diplomat Mary Walsh in making his film about Kosovo. Malagurski became a Canadian citizen and remained in Canada until 2011, when he returned to work in Serbia.

Malagurski attended Kitsilano Secondary School in Kitsilano neighbourhood of Vancouver. He earned his bachelor's degree in film production from the University of British Columbia. In July 2019, he earned his master's degree in film from the University of Staffordshire.

== Career ==
In 2010, Serbian newspaper Politika described Malagurski as the "Serbian Michael Moore", though himself had spoken of his use of "Michael Moore post-production techniques" earlier that year.

=== Film ===
==== Kosovo: Can You Imagine? ====
In 2009, Malagurski released Kosovo: Can You Imagine?, a documentary film about the plight of Serb communities living in Kosovo at that time. Former Canadian general Lewis MacKenzie, Canadian former diplomat James Byron Bissett, former UNMIK officer John Hawthorne and economist Michel Chossudovsky are interviewed in the film.

==== The Weight of Chains ====
In 2010, Malagurski released The Weight of Chains, his documentary film analyzing the role that the United States, the European Union, and the NATO alliance as a whole allegedly played in the breakup of Yugoslavia. The film features interviews with James Byron Bissett, John Bosnitch, Michel Chossudovsky, Vlade Divac, Branislav Lečić, Veran Matić, John Perkins, general Lewis MacKenzie, among others. The film was shown in cinemas in Australia, Canada, the United States and Serbia, also at the festivals listed below, and on Eurochannel TV networks. In December 2018, the film was added to the film and video catalog of the Library of United States Congress.

==== The Presumption of Justice ====
Malagurski co-directed The Presumption of Justice in 2012 with Ivana Rajović, a documentary dealing with the September 2009 death of Brice Taton, a fan of Toulouse FC, and alleged inconsistencies in the subsequent court case in Serbia. The film was broadcast in April 2013 as a part of Malagurski's TV show on Happy TV which also featured an interview with a man who claimed to have witnessed the event, but who had not been called to testify.

==== Belgrade ====
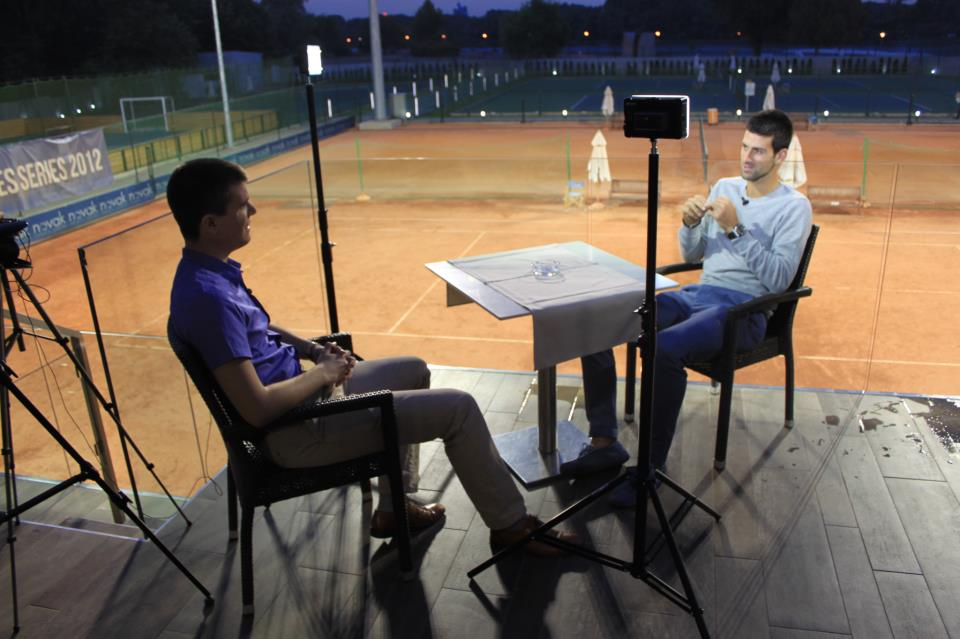
Boris Malagurski interviewing Novak Djokovic for Belgrade

Malagurski's next film ,Belgrade (also known as Belgrade with Boris Malagurski) – a documentary about Belgrade – the capital of Serbia, premiered worldwide on 19 October 2013 at Sava Centar in Belgrade and aired on Radio Television of Serbia (RTS) on 20 October 2014. The film features interviews with several Belgrade-born public figures, including tennis player Novak Djokovic.

==== The Weight of Chains 2 ====
The Weight of Chains 2 was released in 2014 as a part of the Serbian Film Festival at Montecasino in Johannesburg, South Africa. It features interviews with Noam Chomsky, Carla Del Ponte, Mlađan Dinkić, Vuk Jeremić, Ivo Josipović, Slavko Kulić, Miroslav Lazanski, Michael Parenti, Oliver Stone, James Woolsey, among others. The film discusses the effects of neoliberal reforms on all aspects of life in the former Yugoslavia, from politics, economics, military, culture and education to the media. Festival screenings include Raindance Film Festival and the Subversive Festival and others listed below, and it was broadcast by RTS.

==== Kosovo: A Moment in Civilization ====
In September 2017, Malagurski released a documentary film about Serbian monasteries in Kosovo called Kosovo: A Moment In Civilization, designed to oppose Kosovo's membership in UNESCO. The film was released on 15 September 2017 in Paris, France. The film was condemned by Kosovo's government.

==== Like Me a Million ====
Malagurski directed and produced a Serbian short film Like Me a Million. It stars Nikola Kojo, Miloš Biković, and Maja Šuša. The film was released on 29 March 2019 at the 66th Belgrade Documentary and Short Film Festival.

==== The Weight of Chains 3 ====
Malagurski made the third part of The Weight of Chains film series which deals with how big business and political interest groups endanger peoples' health and very existence. Released in Chicago on 28 September 2019, the film features interviews with Jeffrey Sachs, Katrín Jakobsdóttir, Noam Chomsky, Nele Karajlić and Danica Grujičić.

==== Montenegro: A Land Divided ====
In December 2019, Malagurski announced that he would produce and direct a documentary film about the 2019 crisis in Montenegro. The announcement came following clerical protests in Montenegro. In November 2020, the official film trailer was released, featuring interviews with Amfilohije Radović, Zdravko Krivokapić, Matija Bećković, and others. The film had its world premiere in Belgrade in May 2021.

==== Srpska: The Struggle for Freedom ====
Malagurski directed the feature documentary film that chronicles the history of Serbs who live West of the Drina river, including an interview with Serbian film director Emir Kusturica. The film was financed by the city of Banja Luka and other municipalities in Republika Srpska, as well as by individual donors, and premiered in Banja Luka in October 2022. There were calls for screenings to be cancelled in several European countries, who accused it of denying the Bosnian genocide.

=== Television ===
From 2013 to 2015, Malagurski hosted Revolution, a weekly TV show on Happy TV. The show, featured documentary segments and interviews with state officials, foreign and local experts and ordinary citizens of Serbia. In January 2013, after an interview for Malagurski's TV series Revolution with Vesna Kostić of the World Bank office in Belgrade was broadcast, Kostić complained that Malagurski had "forged" a conversation in the broadcast. Malagurski denied the claims, adding Kostic "forgot how she answered the questions".

During the 2014 Southeast Europe floods, Malagurski reported for Happy TV from several flooded areas in Serbia. The show was cancelled in January 2015. Malagurski alleged that Happy TV gave no official reason for the show's cancellation.

From 2015 to 2017, Malagurski worked as the executive producer and host of a TV show, Globalno, on BN TV, which deals with "global topics from a domestic perspective."

From May 2017 to December 2018, Malagurski was the editor and host of a clip show for the Sputnik Serbia news agency, and the editor and host of a clip show, ClipaRT with Boris Malagurski, for the Russian state-funded RT Documentary channel, dealing with global issues. From April 2019 to September 2020, Malagurski hosted and edited a clip show, known as the Malagurski Ukratko (lit. 'Malagurski in Short'), for the Slobodna Television channel, dealing with domestic issues. From 2020 to 2022, he worked with RT on a clip show titled Big Stories & Beyond with Boris Malagurski.

Malagurski has also appeared on RT, to comment on Balkan topics. In 2020, he was described as "one of Sputnik's YouTube stars popular with young people".

=== Journalism ===
Malagurski has written articles for the Politika daily newspaper and a political magazine Nova srpska politička misao.

== Political views ==
Malagurski is a Eurosceptic, believing that "chasing the EU is like going on a blind date, you don't know what will happen, but you still want to go because you are desperate."

In an interview for Marin Marinković's talk show One On One on Alternativna TV, Malagurski identified as left-leaning. In an article in Danas, he denounced attempts by some to label him as "extremely right-wing", stating that his films were screened in leftist festivals such as the Subversive Festival in Croatia, that worldwide screenings were organized with the help of leftist parties such as the Left-Green Movement in Iceland and that he was compared to Michael Moore and even Karl Marx in the Slovenian newspaper Delo. Malagurski described these attempts as "Balkan self-declared leftists and civic elitists wanting to hold on to their monopoly of views that are allowed in that ideological sphere", adding that "if anyone dares to criticize the European Union as a bureaucratic elite dictatorship in Brussels, NATO as the army of America's corporate interests and the local NGO sector that deals with politics and receives money from abroad as agents of foreign interests, one can only be labelled as a "right-winger" or whatever sounds more gruesome to uninformed audiences."

Malagurski "supports protests as a form of pressure on governments" and that "elections are important, but democracy works only if we create the conditions under which any elected official will have to make decisions". Malagurski believes that "every government makes decisions in favor of the people only when in fear of the public reaction". As a critic of neoliberalism, Malagurski believes that "resistance to neoliberalism is no longer a matter of ideology, but of common sense", and he advocates the inclusion of young people in politics, noticing that most people in Serbia who share similar problems are not united and cannot recognize their common interest.

Malagurski was interviewed for Amir Zukić's talk show Pressing on N1 in which he expressed his condemnation of United States foreign policy, noting that "what the United States are doing to Muslims is far more deceitful than what the Nazis did to the Jews, because the Americans are telling Muslims that everything they do is for their own good." According to Malagurski, this shows how well developed the Western propaganda machine is, adding that "Joseph Goebbels would be fascinated by what the West has achieved." On the topic of relations between states and peoples in the Southeastern Europe, Malagurski also stated that "people in the Balkans need reconciliation, and to talk about what brings us together".

Malagurski has also expressed views on Croatian politics, adding his support for Ivan Pernar and the populist Human Shield political party and Macedonian politics, arguing that "the West has made Macedonia an extremely vulnerable and divided country, and that as such it needs a miracle to survive, unfortunately."

== Activism ==
In October 2011, Malagurski showed his film The Weight of Chains at the Jarinje barricades on the Kosovo-Serbia border, which he said was a show of support for Serbs in Kosovo.

In June 2012, Malagurski took part in a protest in front of the Radio Television Serbia building, that called for an end to "organized media darkness" in Serbia and requested the airing of Malagurski's film The Weight of Chains on Serbia's public broadcaster. In front of 200 protesters, Malagurski said that RTS director Aleksandar Tijanić had told him that despite positive reviews, The Weight of Chains could not aired on said channel because it had aired on Happy TV. Malagurski claimed only clips had been shown, which he corroborated with documents from the latter channel. He also claimed that "Serbia is the only country in the region and in almost all of Europe, where The Weight of Chains has not been shown by the national public broadcaster".

Malagurski has given speeches about Balkan political issues, specifically on the future status of Kosovo. These include student and public forums at the University of Belgrade and elsewhere.

Political Analyst Jasmin Mujanović has described Malagurski as one of the commentators who "peddle 'Russian-themed' disinformation", used in Russian state influence campaigns in the Balkans. The Kosovar Centre for Security Studies has described him as one of the "prominent individuals that actively promote and shape far-right extremist narratives against Kosovo". He has faced protests from the Albanian community in New York and been denied entry to Kosovo.

== Controversies ==
In September 2012, Malagurski and co-director Ivana Rajović filed a criminal investigation request at Belgrade public prosecutor's office against twelve members of an internet message board for alleged "organized threats to their life and personal and professional safety", made on the message board after the premiere of The Presumption of Justice. Three of the twelve were charged and found guilty in March 2014 at the trial court in Belgrade, each was sentenced to one year in prison and suspended for three years of probation. His actions and the court's decisions were criticised by Milica Jovanović, and Dario Hajrić

In responses published by Vreme in March 2014, and by NSPM in April 2014. Historian Čedomir Antić criticised Malagurski's accusers in an op-ed in Politika.

== Personal life ==
Malagurski is the owner and CEO of Malagurski Cinema, a film production company.

== Filmography ==
Year	Film	Director	Writer	Producer
2010	The Weight of Chains	Yes	Yes	Yes
2012	The Presumption of Justice	Yes	Yes	Yes
2013	Belgrade	Yes	Yes	Yes
2014	The Weight of Chains 2	Yes	Yes	Yes
2017	Kosovo: A Moment in Civilization	Yes	No	Yes
2019	The Weight of Chains 3	Yes	Yes	Yes
2021	Montenegro: A Land Divided	Yes	No	Yes
2022	Srpska: The Struggle for Freedom	Yes	No	Yes

=== Short films ===
- The Canada Project (2005)
- Kosovo: Can You Imagine? (2009)
- Like Me a Million (2019)

== Festival screenings ==
2005

- The Canada Project and Vreme Je in 'Young European Filmmakers' at the Palić Film Festival in Palić, Serbia

2009

- Silver Palm Award (one of 14 films awarded in the Student Film category) for Kosovo: Can You Imagine? at the Mexico International Film Festival, Rosarito, Mexico.
- Kosovo: Can You Imagine? at the BridgeFest International Film Festival, East Sarajevo, Bosnia-Herzegovina

2011

- The Weight of Chains at the International Festival of New Latin American Cinema, Havana, Cuba
- The Weight of Chains at the Moving Images Film Festival, Toronto, Ontario, Canada
- The Weight of Chains at the Beldocs International Documentary Film Festival, Belgrade, Serbia. As part of Beldocs eho in Novi Sad, it also took place in Zrenjanin, Kragujevac, Niš, Vršac, and Aleksinac – all in Serbia.

2013

- Belgrade at the Serbian Film Festival at Montecasino in Johannesburg, South Africa

2014

- The Weight of Chains at the Balkan New Film Festival in Oslo, Norway
- The Weight of Chains 2 at the Serbian Film Festival at Montecasino in Johannesburg, South Africa

2015

- The Weight of Chains 2 at the Balkan New Film Festival in Oslo, Norway
- The Weight of Chains 2 at the Subversive Festival in Zagreb, Croatia
- The Weight of Chains 2 at the Raindance Film Festival in London, United Kingdom

2019

- Like Me a Million at the Belgrade Documentary and Short Film Festival.

2020s

- 2020:
  - The Weight of Chains 3 at the Belgrade DOK Film Festival.
  - Best Documentary Feature, Best Screenplay In A Documentary Feature and Best Editing In A Documentary Feature for The Weight of Chains 3 at the South Film and Arts Academy Festival, Chile.
- 2022: Best Historical Documentary for Srpska: The Struggle for Freedom at the Silk Road Film Awards, Cannes, France.
- 2023: Best Documentary Feature, Best Directing In A Documentary Feature and Best Cinematography In A Documentary Feature for Srpska: The Struggle for Freedom at the South Film and Arts Academy Festival, Chile.
