= Globalno =

Bosnian television talk show

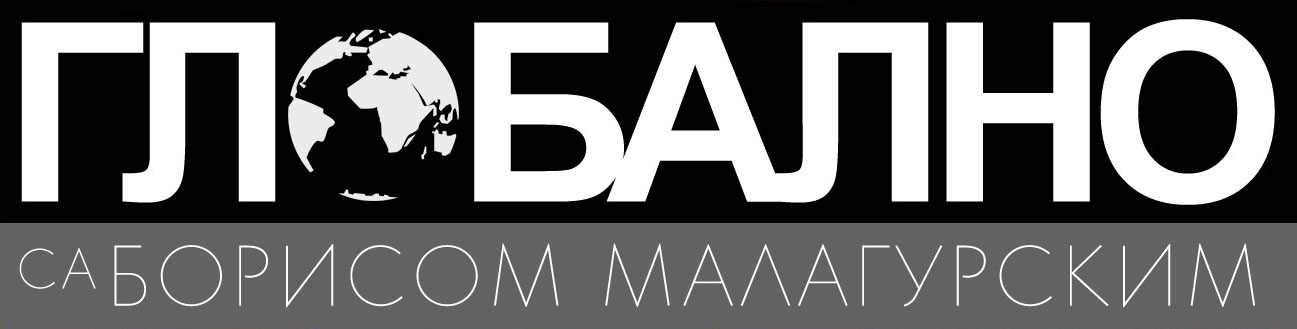
- Genre: Talk show
- Created by: Boris Malagurski
- Directed by: Dario Stojanović
- Presented by: Boris Malagurski (2015–2017); Marko Jeremić (2017)
- Country of origin: Bosnia and Herzegovina
- Original language: Serbo-Croatian
- No. of seasons: 2
- No. of episodes: 56

Production
- Production location: Bijeljina
- Camera setup: Multi-camera
- Running time: 90 minutes (with commercials)

Original release
- Network: BN TV
- Release: December 18, 2015 – June 14, 2017

Globalno (English: Globally) was a Bosnian television talk show airing on Wednesdays on BN Televizija in Bosnia and Herzegovina. The show premiered on Friday, December 18, 2015, and was created by Boris Malagurski. It was hosted by Boris Malagurski (2015–2017) and Marko Jeremić (2017). The TV show dealt with global political, economic and social issues from a domestic perspective. The first season was aired on Fridays. The show's final airing was June 14, 2017.

== Format ==
The TV show begun with a monologue by the host, Malagurski, who talks about events from the previous week, with video clips and photographs. The monologue is inspired by Last Week Tonight with John Oliver. Malagurski gives his comments in front of a studio audience and then introduces the guests, with whom he talks for the rest of the show. The program sometimes includes reports from Bijeljina and cities in the region, but also countries around the world, such as Australia and South Africa.

== Guests ==
Politicians from Croatia, Bosnia and Herzegovina and Serbia who have made appearances on the show include former or current ministers of the Serbian Government such as Velimir Ilić, Žarko Obradović, Dragan Šutanovac and Bratislav Petković, Human Shield members Ivan Pernar and Ivan Vilibor Sinčić, and member of the Presidency of Bosnia and Herzegovina Mladen Ivanić.

=== Guest appearances ===
Number	Name	Episodes
4	Ivan Pernar	11, 23, 29, 56
4	Damir Nikšić	17, 23, 24, 56
3	Marko Milačić	4, 23, 29
3	Istok Pavlović	9, 39, 46

== Episodes ==
Season	Episodes	Originally aired	
Season	Episodes	First aired	Last aired
1	23	December 18, 2015	June 10, 2016
2	33	October 12, 2016	June 14, 2017

=== Season One (2015–2016) ===
No.	Original air date	Guest(s)	Reports/Inclusions	Ref.
1	December 18, 2015	Boško Jakšić, Domagoj Margetić, Dragan Petrović	Stefan Popović, Zlatko Bogatinovski, Aleksandar Savić	
Third World War
2	December 25, 2015	Dragoljub Petrović, Mila Alečković, Branko Pavlović	Nele Karajlić, Dragoljub Ljubičić	
The biggest events in 2015
3	January 15, 2016	Vladimir Marinković, Branko Ružić, Borko Stefanović	Fran Brdar, Lara Janković	
Left-wing politics in the Balkans and in the World
4	January 22, 2016	Ivan Vilibor Sinčić, Boško Obradović, Marko Milačić	N/A	
Anti-globalization movement in the Balkans
5	January 29, 2016	Bratislav Petković, Feđa Dimović, Branko Radaković	N/A	
Culture in the Balkans and in the world
6	February 5, 2016	Mladen Ivanić, Dragan Čavić, Mićo Mićić, Empty Chair	N/A	
The current political situation in the Republic of Srpska
7	February 12, 2016	Marija Obradović, Dijana Vukomanović, Sanda Rašković Ivić	N/A	
The Women position in society, Russia–European Union relations, European migrant crisis
8	February 19, 2016	Velimir Ilić, Žarko Obradović, Dragan Šutanovac, Marko Ðurišić	N/A	
Serbia–NATO Agreement, Serbian parliamentary election
9	February 25, 2016	Istok Pavlović, Dragan Jovanović, Nevena Tomić	Aleksandar Stevanović	
Social media in election campaigns, Anti-NATO protest in Belgrade, Media, Serbian parliamentary election, US presidential election.
10	March 4, 2016	Boban Jevtić, Vera Robić-Škarica, Emir Hadžihafizbegović	Zoran Galić	
Regional film co-production.
11	March 11, 2016	Ivan Pernar, Radomir Šalić	Muharem Karamujić	
The banking sector in BiH, Serbia, Croatia and the world.
12	March 18, 2016	Zvonimir Trajković, Zlatko Bogatinovski	N/A	
How did we get to this political and economic situation?
13	March 25, 2016	Aleksandar Radojević, Jugoslav Cvetković	N/A	
Vaccine controversies
14	April 1, 2016	Aleksa Milojević, Aleksandar Protić, Marko Ignjatić, Vladimir Vlajić, Marko Antić	Đuro Ćetković, Stefan Popović	
To leave the Balkans or not to leave.
15	April 8, 2016	Slobodan Bijelić, Goran Petronijević, Branko Radun	Ante Nazor	
The ICTY sentences given to Radovan Karadžić and Vojislav Šešelj.
16	April 15, 2016	Savo Štrbac, Hrvoje Runtić, Zoran Kojić	N/A	
Croatia-Serbia relations
17	April 22, 2016	Šeherzada Delić, Marko Vidojković, Vladislav Dajković, Damir Nikšić	N/A	
How to change societies through revolutionary methods
18	May 6, 2016	Željko Cvijanović, Slobodan Georgijev	N/A	
What happened at the parliamentary election in Serbia?
19	May 13, 2016	Zdravko Krsmanović, Slavko Vučurević, Adam Šukalo, Rado Savić, Darko Matijašević, Dragomir Jovičić	N/A	
14 May Protests in Banja Luka, Republika Srpska
20	May 20, 2016	Darko Trifunović, Predrag Ćeranić, Drago Vuković, Dževad Galijašević	N/A	
Aftermath of 14 May Protests in Banja Luka and situation in Republika Srpska
21	May 27, 2016	Branko Pavlović, Vesna Jugović, Stevan Nedeljković, Milan Krstić	N/A	
How will the US presidential election affect the Balkans?
22	June 3, 2016	Milo Lompar, Vukašin Obradović, Tatjana Vojtehovski, Miloš Stojković	N/A	
Serbian Orthodox Church - the role of spirituality among people in the 21st century and the recent controversy surrounding the vehicle fleet of the Church and other topics
23	June 10, 2016	Feđa Dimović, Ivan Pernar, Marko Milačić	Damir Nikšić	
Best of Globalno Season One. How to change society to a better place.

=== Season Two (2016–2017) ===
No. overall	No. in season	Original air date	Guest(s)	Ref.
24	1	October 12, 2016	Damir Nikšić, Konstantin Savić, Damjan Pajić	
Main segment: Bosnian municipal elections, 2016
25	2	October 19, 2016	Adam Šukalo, Čedomir Antić, Darko Trifunović, Srđan Perišić	
Main segment: Bosnia after local elections and referendum, Montenegrin parliamentary election
26	3	October 26, 2016	Aleksandar Popov, Velizar Antić	
Main segment: Situation in Bosnia and Herzegovina after local elections and referendum
27	4	November 2, 2016	Milan Krstić, Miodrag Zarković, Stevan Nedeljković	
Main segment: 2016 United States presidential election
28	5	November 9, 2016	Branislav Borenović, Lazo Marić, Dalibor Stević, Momčilo Novaković	
Main segment: Corruption in the Republic of Srpska
29	6	November 16, 2016	Ivan Pernar, Vlade Radulović, Marko Milačić, Darko Trifunović	
Main segment: North Atlantic integration of the Balkans and a relationship with the NATO after the election of Donald Trump for the President of the United States
30	7	November 23, 2016	Charles Cather, Thiago Ferreira, Jean-Antoine Bartoli Parrer	
Main segment: Brain drain. Why young people are leaving the Balkans. Why foreigners come to live in Serbia.
31	8	November 30, 2016	Mladen Ivanić, Boško Jakšić	
Main segment: Domestic and global threats to the stability of Bosnia and Herzegovina and the region. The death of Fidel Castro. The future impact of Trump cabinet to the Balkans.
32	9	December 7, 2016	Dejan Lučić, Konstantin Savić, Vanja Elez	
Main segment: Who pulling the strings of events in Bosnia and Herzegovina, Serbia and the Balkans? Is there a conspiracy of the political elite against the people of this area?
33	10	December 14, 2016	Draško Stanivuković, Andrea Dorić, Davor Šešić, Momčilo Žugić	
Main segment: Youth in politics in the Republic of Srpska
34	11	December 21, 2016	Gordana Vidović, Danijela Kaloci, Rada Perić	
Main segment: The family violence (violence against women)
35	12	January 18, 2017	Ruža Ćirković, Ljubinka Milinčić	
Main segment: Expectations in 2017, First days of Donald Trump's presidency, Serbian presidential election
36	13	January 25, 2017	Aleksandar Apostolovski, Zoran Panović	
Main segment: New World Order
37	14	February 1, 2017	Aleksandar Pavić, Nebojša Vukanović, Branko Pavlović, Vuk Bačanović	
Main segment: US imposed sanctions against Milorad Dodik
38	15	February 8, 2017	Anica Ramić, Nurka Pranjić, Miodrag Femić	
Main segment: Healthcare system in Bosnia and Herzegovina
39	16	February 15, 2017	Tarik Kapetanović, Istok Pavlović	
Main segment: Political marketing
40	17	February 22, 2017	Predrag Jović, Momčilo Novaković, Dalibor Stević	
Main segment: The political situation in Republika Srpska, the federalization of Bosnia and Hercegovina, the effects of United States foreign policy on Republika Srpska
41	18	March 1, 2017	Ramiz Salkić, Dejan Mirović, Zdravko Krsmanović	
Main segment: Bosnia and Hercegovina's lawsuit against Serbia at the International Court of Justice
42	19	March 8, 2017	Bratislav Jugović, Marko Pušica, Miloš Stojković	
Main segment: How are Serbs living in Kosovo.
43	20	March 15, 2017	Dušan Proroković, Vlade Radulović, Viktor Azmanoski	
Main segment: The political crisis in Macedonia
44	21	March 22, 2017	Slavica Lukić, Svjetlana Miličić, Slaven Divčić	
Main segment: How to get employment in the Balkans
45	22	March 29, 2017	Dževad Galijašević, Aleksa Milojević, Vanja Elez, Drago Vuković	
Main segment: Are the Clintons fanning the flames of war in the Balkans to bring down Donald Trump?
46	23	April 5, 2017	Slobodan Georgiev, Branko Radun, Istok Pavlović, Dragan Petrović	
Main segment: The results of the 2017 Presidential elections in Serbia
47	24	April 12, 2017	Bojan Klačar, Ivan Ninić, Muharem Bazdulj	
Main segment: The electoral system in the Balkans, with an emphasis on Serbia
48	25	April 19, 2017	Jovica Andonov, Radivoje Bukvić, Filip Filipi	
Main segment: Successful Serbs living outside of the Balkans
49	26	April 26, 2017	David Icke	
Main segment: Conspiracy theory
50	27	May 3, 2017	Snježana Kordić, Miloš Kovačević, Nedžad Ibrahimović	
Main segment: The declaration on common language
51	28	May 10, 2017	Ruža Ćirković, Darko Trifunović, Mitko Arnaudov	
Main segment: Macedonian crisis
52	29	May 17, 2017	Marko Milačić, Aleksandar Radić, Vladislav Dajković	
Main segment: Montenegro–NATO relations
53	30	May 24, 2017	Zoran Pavlović, Zoran Lukić, Zdravko Krsmanović, Zoran Babić	
Main segment: Privatization in Republika Srpska
54	31	May 31, 2017	Dušan Janjić, Aleksandar Pavić	
Main segment: Terrorism around Europe and the World
55	32	June 7, 2017	Miroljub Petrović, Dejan Lučić, John Bosnitch	
Main segment: Secret society
56	33	June 14, 2017	Ljubiša Preletačević Beli, Nebojša Prilepak, Ivan Pernar, Damir Nikšić, Draško Stanivuković	
Main segment: Youth politicians in the Balcans

== International broadcast ==
Globalno is seen internationally on YouTube and is broadcast on BN TV Satellite Channel on Wednesdays.

== See also ==
- Revolucija (TV show)
