= Kosovo: Can You Imagine? =

- Official poster
- Directed by: Boris Malagurski
- Written by: Boris Malagurski
- Produced by: Brian Mitchell
- Starring: Lewis MacKenzie; James Byron Bissett; Michel Chossudovsky
- Edited by: Boris Malagurski
- Music by: Filip Borac; Mihaela Cristina Istrate; Kevin Macleod; Boris Malagurski
- Production company: Malagurski Cinema
- Release date: 15 March 2009
- Running time: 30 minutes
- Country: Canada
- Languages: English; Serbian; Albanian

Kosovo: Can You Imagine? is a 2009 documentary film directed by Serbian Canadian Boris Malagurski about the plight of Serb communities living in Kosovo at the time the documentary was filmed. Former Canadian general Lewis MacKenzie, former Canadian diplomat James Byron Bissett, former UNMIK officer John Hawthorne and economist Michel Chossudovsky appear in the film.

== Synopsis ==
The film gives a brief account of Kosovo's history, starting from the Battle of Kosovo, up to the UN administration, which existed after 1999, when, NATO bombed Yugoslavia for 78 days to halt a Serbian crackdown on ethnic Albanian separatism in its province of Kosovo. It includes claims about the rights that Kosovo Albanians had during socialist Yugoslavia and parallels between the Kosovo Liberation Army and the separatist Front de libération du Québec by retired Canadian General Lewis Mackenzie. Former Canadian ambassador James Byron Bissett claims, that in the years following the war, many Serbs were expelled from their homes, kidnapped and killed, while a large number of their houses, cultural and religious sites were burned and destroyed. After that, economist Michel Chossudovsky discusses an alleged link between Kosovo's military and political leadership and organized crime.

The film presents most of the Kosovo Serbs as internally displaced, some of them living in enclaves, in small camps in Kosovo. The film follows the stories of several Serb victims.

== Awards and screenings ==
- 2009, Silver Palm Award (one of 14 films awarded in the Student Film category) for "Kosovo: Can You Imagine?" at the Mexico International Film Festival 2009, Rosarito, Mexico.

== See also ==
- Kosovo: A Moment in Civilization
- Anti-Serb sentiment
