= The Weight of Chains =

- Official poster
- Directed by: Boris Malagurski
- Screenplay by: Boris Malagurski
- Produced by: Boris Malagurski
- Starring: Michel Chossudovsky; Lewis MacKenzie; Vlade Divac; John Perkins; Michael Parenti; Scott Taylor; Jože Mencinger; James Bissett; John Bosnitch; Branislav Lečić; Škabo; Srđa Trifković; Slobodan Samardžić
- Edited by: Boris Malagurski; Anastasia Trofimova; Marko Janković
- Music by: Novo Sekulović; Jasna Đuran; Kevin Macleod
- Production company: Malagurski Cinema
- Distributed by: Journeyman Pictures (Worldwide)
- Release dates: December 17, 2010 (Australia); February 19, 2011 (Canada)
- Running time: 124 minutes
- Country: Canada
- Languages: English, Serbian
- Budget: $21,850

The Weight of Chains is a 2010 Canadian documentary film directed by Boris Malagurski. The film argues that the breakup of Yugoslavia was "orchestrated by Western powers in furtherance of imperial ambitions". According to the filmmaker, it also presents stories of "good people in evil times". It was released on December 17, 2010.

The sequel, The Weight of Chains 2, was released on November 20, 2014, while the last part of the trilogy, The Weight of Chains 3, was released on September 28, 2019.

== Production ==
The film was sponsored by Serbian diaspora community organizations, the Centre for Research on Globalization, and private individuals amongst others.

The film uses re-compiled archival footage extensively, which was provided at no cost by Radio Television Serbia.

== Synopsis ==
The film provides a background history of Yugoslavia, from the medieval Battle of Kosovo to Serbia's invasion of Kosovo in 1912, and then to the formation of Josip Broz Tito's Socialist Federal Republic of Yugoslavia after World War II. It discusses the persecution of Kosovo Serbs after World War II, as well as alleged plans by Nationalists to create an ethnically pure Greater Albania.

The film claims that U.S. interests in Yugoslavia promoted "a market-oriented Yugoslav economic structure" through the National Endowment for Democracy, and the G17 Plus as part of a policy of "privatization through liquidation" that increased ethnic tensions in the late 1980s and early 1990s. Western nations, both openly diplomatically and covertly militarily, supported separatist groups and encouraged conflict so that NATO could be installed as peacekeepers for their own interests. A cigarette factory that was bombed by NATO was later bought by Philip Morris, which the film presents as an example, that the purpose of the war was economic colonization of the country.

The film claims Yugoslavian leaders such as Slobodan Milošević, Franjo Tuđman and Alija Izetbegović were focused only on power, and not on the well-being of their people and they, along with the local media, mobilized public opinion in favor of conflict. These tensions led to the 1990s Yugoslav Wars, which culminated in the Kosovo war.

The film presents the fall of Srebrenica "as a stage-managed ploy by the Bosnians and Americans to justify NATO military intervention against Serbia". Interviewee Srđa Trifković asserts that there are "trustworthy witnesses" who claim that Bill Clinton had indicated that "5,000 dead Muslims would be the price of NATO intervention" and that these witnesses believe that "Srebrenica was deliberately sacrificed by Izetbegović in order to provide this burnt offering to the White House". The film also presents the Srebrenica "civilian death toll as no larger than the number of Serbs killed in the surrounding area".

The film includes interviews with the widow of Josip Reihl-Kir (former police chief of Osijek, Croatia) and the widow of Milan Levar along with the story of Srđan Aleksić, who saved a Muslim man from an attack by soldiers of the VRS. There is footage of the village Vrhbarje in Bosnia where Serbs and Bosniaks lived together up to the end of the Bosnian war, but were then separated – as the Muslim Bosniaks, left for their own entity.

The film argues that, in the aftermath of the war, the policies of the International Monetary Fund and the World Bank further demonstrated that Eastern European states were not meant to be equals with the European Union and the West, but rather were only seen as markets for Western goods and sources of cheap labor. The film portrays an increase in the debt of the former Yugoslav countries by showing how much tax money each citizen of the former Yugoslavia would have to pay in order for their countries to be debt-free.

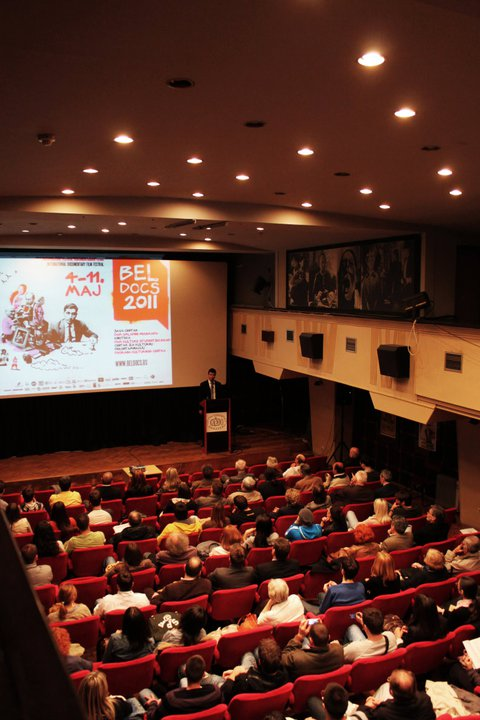
Malagurski at the Belgrade premiere of the film at the BELDOCS Film Festival at the Kinoteka theater in 2011

== Interviewees ==
The interviewees in the film include:

- Rade Aleksić — Whose son Srđan Aleksić, lost his life while defending a Muslim friend - an ethnic Bosniak - who was being attacked by a group of soldiers of the VRS.
- James Bissett — Former Canadian diplomat who served as ambassador extraordinary and plenipotentiary to Yugoslavia, Albania, and Bulgaria. Defence witness for Slobodan Milošević.
- John Bosnitch — Canadian journalist of Serbian descent, consultant and political activist.
- Michel Chossudovsky — Canadian economist and professor of economics at the University of Ottawa.
- Vlade Divac — Retired Yugoslav as well as United States' NBA professional basketball player, humanitarian worker
- Blasko Gabric — Founder and 'President' of 'Fourth Yugoslavia', park located in Subotica, Serbia
- Branislav Lečić — Former Serbian minister of culture in the government of the late Zoran Đinđić.
- Lewis MacKenzie — UE, CM, CMM, MSC, O.Ont, CD, retired Canadian general, author and media commentator, established and commanded Sector Sarajevo as part of UNPROFOR in Yugoslavia in 1992.
- Veran Matić — chief executive officer of B92.
- Jože Mencinger — Slovenian lawyer, economist, and politician who served as Minister of Economy of the Republic of Slovenia and the Slovenian vice president of government for economic coordination from 1990 to 1991.
- Michael Parenti — American political scientist, historian, and cultural critic.
- John Perkins – Author, best known for his book Confessions of an Economic Hit Man.
- Slobodan Samardžić — Serbian academic and politician, and the former minister for Kosovo in the Government of Serbia.
- Škabo (Bosko Cirkovic) — Rapper, beatmaker and producer from Belgrade, Serbia, who is also the founder of Beogradski Sindikat.
- Scott Taylor – Canadian journalist who specializes in military and war reporting.
- Zvonimir Trajkovic — Described on the film's website as:- Serbian political advisor to Slobodan Milošević (1990 – '93) and Radovan Karadžić ('94 – '97).
- Srđa Trifković — Serbian-American writer, foreign affairs editor for the paleoconservative magazine Chronicles 1998–2009, and former unofficial spokesperson for the Republika Srpska government in 1995. Defence witness for a number of convicted Serbian war criminals.
- Visar Ymeri — Kosovo activist and politician.

== Release ==
The Weight of Chains was screened at the 2011 Beldocs International Documentary Film Festival, Belgrade, Serbia and, as part of the 2011 Beldocs eho Documentary Film Festival, in Novi Sad, Zrenjanin, Kragujevac, Niš, Vršac and Aleksinac, in Serbia. It was also screened in London, England as part of the Balkan Cinema Strand at the Raindance Film Festival 2011, at the 2011 Moving Image Film Festival 2011 in Toronto, Canada, at the International Festival of New Latin American Cinema in Havana, Cuba, and at the Balkan New Film Festival in Oslo, Norway. The film has also had cinema screenings in Australia, Serbia, Canada, and the United States.

The film was also due to be shown in the 2011 programme of Serbian film director Emir Kusturica at the Küstendorf Film and Music Festival. However two days before the festival began, the film was removed from the schedule without explanation.

The film was broadcast in early 2015 on Eurochannel TV networks.

=== RTS protest ===
In June 2012, a protest in front of the Radio Television Serbia building requested the airing The Weight of Chains on Serbia's public broadcaster. In front of 200 protesters, Malagurski said that Aleksandar Tijanić, the director of RTS, had told him that despite positive reviews, The Weight of Chains couldn't be aired on RTS because it had already been aired on Happy TV, Malagurski claimed only clips had been shown, which he said was corroborated by documents from Happy TV. Malagurski also said that "Serbia is the only country in the region and in almost all of Europe, where The Weight of Chains has not been shown by the national public broadcaster".

== Critical response ==
The film has received mixed responses, these include (ordered by publication date):

Toni Ti, writing in Brightest Young Things, a Washington DC and New York-based web magazine, noted that the film "brings up a lot of issues the public may not be aware of". However, she describes the "often-gratingly blatant bias of the film maker". Malagurski, she says "employs a quippy sarcastic tone that sounds incredibly petulant and at times, too amateur for the gravitas subject matter". She goes on, "overall, spending 30 minutes on Kosovo and barely mentioning what really happened in Srebrenica leaves me questioning the director’s choice in taking this approach". Concluding, "what is he trying to show? It can be quite baffling at times".

Vladislav Panov of Pečat, a weekly political magazine in Serbia, wrote that the film is "very convincing" and that "Malagurski covered the facts and scenes in the film just as Michael Moore does in his documentaries. And just like that film maker, obviously Boris' main role model, Malagurski located the source of evil in Washington and big American corporations which had come to buy us out after instructing and preparing 'irrational slaughters of primitive Balkan peoples' ", but added that "Boris bravely detected the main domestic culprits in G17 Plus in skimming the cream on behalf of foreigners".

Konstantin Kilibarda, writing for the blog Politics, Respun, described the film as a "misguided attempt to give an alternative account of the wars in the former Yugoslavia", and that the film maker "attempts to minimize, deflect and distort the well established role of Serbian leaders in the former Yugoslavia in pursuing a militant nationalist program since the late 1980s, that sought to reclaim Kosovo through the imposition of martial law, as well as create 'ethnically compact' territories that would link Serbs in Serbia with Serbian minorities in Bosnia and Croatia".

Historian Predrag Marković, in a discussion at Singidunum University, said that the film talks with a language understandable to young Westerners, and that "the author, with a fine irony, distances himself in regards to the local figures and presents a very complex problem, evading self-justification that many domestic directors are prone to."

Tristan Miller, writing in the U.K.'s Socialist Standard, wrote "the film’s flimsier claims and arguments can be explained as the work of a naïve but well-meaning patriot, but others cannot be so innocently excused" ... "for all the effort he spends decrying the dishonest propagandising which fuelled the Yugoslavian implosion, he certainly has no qualms employing many of the same tricks when it suits his own agenda". Concluding, "he has a very low estimation of the intelligence of his audience".

Both Miller and Kilibarda were sympathetic to the film's claim that Western economic policies contributed to social instability in the buildup to the Yugoslav Wars. Kilibarda also stated that "Western media often engaged in collective blame of the Serbs" in the mid-1990s.

Lukáš Perný, writing in the Slovak Zem a Vek magazine, noted that the film presents information that helps the viewer to understand the interests behind the "colonization" of Yugoslavia.

Serbian film critic Vladan Petković described the film as "pro-Serbian conspiracy theorist propaganda". According to Petković, "the film is promoted as having been made in Michael Moore's style, but it totally lacks Moore’s characteristic qualities. Instead Malagurski interviews journalists, politicians, ex-ambassadors and historians, who all promote the same one-sided story of Serbia as a victim of Western capitalist imperialism".

Amir Telibećirović of Tačno.net, in his review of the film, described it as: "new model of indoctrination based on the philosophy of Slobodan Milošević and the Serbian Academy of Sciences and Arts, through beautified propaganda, lies and manipulation.
