= The Weight of Chains 2 =

2014 film by Boris Malagurski

- Film poster
- Directed by: Boris Malagurski
- Produced by: Boris Malagurski
- Starring: Noam Chomsky; Carla Del Ponte; Mlađan Dinkić; Vuk Jeremić; Diana Johnstone; Ivo Josipović; Slavko Kulić; Miroslav Lazanski; Igor Mandić; Michael Parenti; Oliver Stone; R. James Woolsey
- Music by: Milan Janković; Ilija Stevanović; Stefan Drndarski; Novo Sekulović
- Production companies: Malagurski Cinema
- Release dates: November 20, 2014 (Serbian Film Festival); December 11, 2014 (Canada)
- Running time: 124 minutes
- Country: Canada
- Languages: English, Serbian
- Budget: $45,049

The Weight of Chains 2 is a 2014 Canadian-Serbian documentary film about the political and economic situation in the countries of the former Yugoslavia. Directed and produced by Boris Malagurski, the film was released on November 20, 2014, at the Serbian Film Festival at Montecasino in Johannesburg, South Africa.

As the sequel of The Weight of Chains, the film deals with neoliberal economic reforms in the Balkans and discusses the effects of these reforms on all aspects of life in the former Yugoslavia, from politics, economics, military, culture and education to the media. "Through stories of stolen and sold off companies, corrupt politicians, fictional tribunals, destructive foreign investors and various economic-military alliances, the film deconstructs modern myths about everything we've been told will bring us a better life", Malagurski told Tanjug.

The film aired on Radio Television of Serbia in July 2016.

== Synopsis ==
The film starts with events that led to the overthrow of Slobodan Milošević on 5 October 2000. It analyzes the National Endowment for Democracy's financing of the Otpor! resistance movement, together with the West's training of Serbian activists and politicians in Budapest and discusses the row between the government and the opposition concerning electoral fraud accusations. The film continues to assess Serbia's economy after the fall of Milošević.

As the concept of neoliberalism is explained in the film, from the teachings of Friedrich Hayek and Ludwig von Mises, to Milton Friedman and the Chicago Boys, and the spread of neoliberalism from the overthrow of Salvador Allende in the 1973 Chilean coup d'état, which brought Augusto Pinochet to power, to Margaret Thatcher's reforms in the United Kingdom and Ronald Reagan's reforms in the United States, Malagurski argues that a 'shock-economy' based on the Washington Consensus led Serbia and other countries to the edge of existence, with the United States imposing these policies by installing puppet regimes. The film asserts that non-governmental organizations, with multimillion-dollar budgets and direct connections with Washington, help keep U.S.-friendly regimes in power and the people in line. Noting that Russia demanded that NGOs register as "foreign agents" in that country to solve this problem, Malagurski mentions that the United States also passed the Foreign Agents Registration Act. "Institutions like the International Monetary Fund", Malagurski said in a discussion, "act like hitmen", whose policies "destroyed the economies of many countries". The destruction of the education system in the former Yugoslavia is assessed in the film as well, with Malagurski arguing that adopting the neoliberal model led to a drastic decrease in quality of learning, combined with vulgar television shows that aim to dumb down the populace.

Malagurski then briefly tackles the topic of the Yugoslav wars, claiming that Slobodan Milošević and Franjo Tuđman, leaders on opposite sides of the conflict, had several common banks abroad where they hid money that was stolen during the war. The film argues that Croatian general Ante Gotovina amassed enormous wealth during the war as well. Carla Del Ponte then discusses the case of Ramush Haradinaj, saying that he was freed because of political pressure from the United States. She also says that UNMIK refused to send evidence of organ theft in Kosovo, arguing that "since NATO and the Kosovo Liberation Army were partners during the war, they couldn't act against each other after the war."

The 2002 Venezuelan coup d'état attempt is analyzed in the film, with Hugo Chávez, who previously changed Venezuela's neoliberal constitution and defied the IMF, briefly being replaced with a President loyal to the United States, arguing that the coup d'état failed because many people went to the streets to demand Chávez back, with Chávez quickly being re-installed as president. Malagurski then presents his recommendations for how a country can free itself from Western control – by protecting local industry, as the film argues that foreign investments destroy local production (noting the examples of South Korea, which restricted foreign investments, as well as Finland from 1930 to 1980), creating a welfare state and making protesting a way of life.

== Production ==
The film was produced with support from the Serbian government Office for Kosovo and Metohija, the Serbian Ministry of Youth and Sport, the Belgrade Secretariat for Culture, Radio Television of Serbia, as well as individual donors worldwide, such as the .

== Release ==
Following the World Premiere in Johannesburg, The Weight of Chains 2 had its European Premiere on November 29, 2014, at the Swedish Film Institute in Stockholm, Sweden, as a part of BANEFF – the Balkan New Film Festival. In an interview, Malagurski said that the film was shown at the Monterrey Institute of Technology and Higher Education and the film was also screened at the Museo Nacional de las Culturas in Mexico City, Mexico.

Subsequent screenings took place in Vancouver and Toronto in Canada, Innsbruck in Austria and Stuttgart and Berlin in Germany. The Balkan premiere took place in Banja Luka, while the Serbian premiere was in Subotica. The film opened in cinemas in Belgrade, Vienna, Novi Sad, Linz, Niš, Kraljevo and was shown in Čačak, Kozarska Dubica, Teslić, Gračanica and Sombor.

The film was also shown in Prague, Czech Republic, and as part of the 2015 BANEFF in Oslo, Norway. It was also screened at the Subversive Festival in Zagreb, Croatia, as well as in Ljubljana, Slovenia, Sarajevo, Bosnia and Herzegovina, Podgorica, Montenegro, and other cities.

In September 2015, the film had its United Kingdom premiere at the 23rd Raindance Film Festival in London.

== Critical response ==
Serbian film critic Dubravka Lakić wrote a review of the film in Politika following the Belgrade premiere of The Weight of Chains 2, in which she wrote that "it's not necessary for you to agree with Malagurski's ideology to notice that he indisputably made a full-blooded and, for our cinematic terms, unsurpassed documentary". She described the film as "exciting and dynamic", adding that, in regards to both content and form, it is a "complex film", which could have been "even better if it had been more concise". Lakić points out that, by "confronting claims made by the interviewees", the message of the film is clearly presented – "resistance to neoliberalism is no longer a matter of ideology, but of common sense".

Agata Tomažič, who interviewed Malagurski in the Slovenian newspaper Delo, described the film as "a Yugoslav version of The Shock Doctrine by Michael Winterbottom … … or a cross between Moore's Capitalism: A Love Story and Gibney's Casino Jack and the United States of Money".

== Interviewees ==
The interviewees in the film include:

- Noam Chomsky – American linguist, philosopher, cognitive scientist, logician, political commentator and activist.
- Carla Del Ponte – former Chief Prosecutor of two United Nations international criminal law tribunals.
- Mlađan Dinkić – Serbian politician, former Deputy Prime Minister of Serbia, co-founder of G17 Plus, first Governor of the National Bank of Serbia from 2000 to 2003
- Vuk Jeremić – Serbian politician, former President of the United Nations General Assembly.
- Diana Johnstone – American political writer, focusing primarily on European politics and Western foreign policy.
- Ivo Josipović – Croatian politician, the President of Croatia from 2010 to 2015.
- Slavko Kulić – Croatian scientist and economist concerned with the sociology of international relations.
- Miroslav Lazanski – Serbian politico-military correspondent and commentator for the Belgrade daily Politika.
- Igor Mandić – Croatian writer, literary critic, columnist and essayist.
- Michael Parenti – American political scientist.
- Ivan Pernar – Croatian politician and activist.
- Oliver Stone – American film director, screenwriter and producer,
- R. James Woolsey – national security and energy specialist and former Director of Central Intelligence who headed the Central Intelligence Agency from 1993 until 1995.

Two of the interviewees were featured only in the film trailer:

- Branimir Brstina – Serbian actor.
- Michael Ruppert – American author, investigative journalist, political activist and peak oil awareness advocate.
