= Like Me a Million =

2019 film

- Film poster
- Serbian: Lajkuj me milion puta
- Directed by: Boris Malagurski
- Written by: Boris Malagurski; Dejan Nikolaj Kraljačić
- Produced by: Boris Malagurski
- Starring: Miloš Biković; Nikola Kojo
- Cinematography: Aleksandar Jakonić
- Production company: Malagurski Cinema
- Release dates: 29 March 2019 (Belgrade); 20 April 2020 (YouTube)
- Running time: 18 minutes
- Country: Serbia
- Language: Serbian

Like Me a Million (Serbian: Лајкуј ме милион пута, romanized: Lajkuj me milion puta) is a 2019 Serbian short comedy film by Serbian Canadian filmmaker Boris Malagurski about reality television shows and the value of human life in an online community. It stars Miloš Biković, Nikola Kojo and Maja Šuša. The film was released on March 29, 2019 at the 66th Belgrade Documentary and Short Film Festival.

== Synopsis ==
It is a comedy about a young couple – Charlie, a news editor on a private television station, and Dana, the TV owner's secretary. Their story is intercepted by the reality news idea of Slobodan, the owner of the television station where both of them work.

Slobodan is in a hurry to start the reality as soon as possible because he owes money to a tycoon and time is running out, and trashy programs generate quick profits. Charlie is reluctant to support Slobodan's idea but Slobodan convinces him it is what the viewers want. Although Slobodan is confident that his idea will generate the needed cash, the tycoon loses his patience. While Slobodan leaves the TV building, two masked men kidnap him and drive off in a van. That is when the twist happens.

== Cast ==
- Miloš Biković as Charlie
- Nikola Kojo as Slobodan
- Maja Šuša as Dana

Predrag Lazarević, Vojislav Tomić, Maša Radović, and Katarina Lazarević Petrović were cast in minor roles.

== Release ==
Following the Premiere in Belgrade, the film was screened at the Sarajevo Youth Film Festival on September 8, 2019.

On April 20, 2020, the film had its YouTube premiere on Malagurski's YouTube channel.
