= Matijasevic =

Matijasevic or Matiyasevich is a Serbo-Croatian and Russian surname. Notable people with the surname include:

- Darko Matijašević, Bosnian politician
- Vladimir Matijašević, Serbian football player
- Yuri Matiyasevich, Russian mathematician and computer scientist
- Mikhail Matiyasevich, Soviet military commander
