= Jože Mencinger =

Slovenian lawyer, economist, and politician (1941–2022)

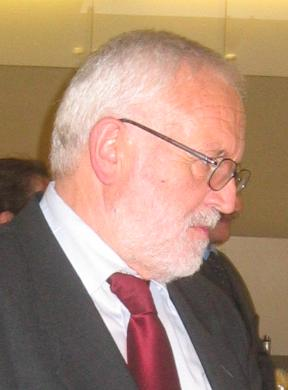
Mencinger in 2007

Jože Mencinger (5 March 1941 – 26 August 2022) was a Slovenian lawyer, economist, and politician.

Mencinger was born in Jesenice, Slovenia, then part of the Kingdom of Yugoslavia. After finishing the study of law at the University of Ljubljana in 1964, he obtained an MA at the University of Belgrade's Law School in 1966. He obtained his PhD at the University of Pennsylvania in 1975.

In May 1990, he was appointed Minister of Economy in the first democratically elected Slovenian government. In Lojze Peterle's cabinet, he served as Vice President of the Government for Economic Coordination from 1990 to 1991 (as a member of the Slovenian Social Democratic Union). In May 1991, he resigned because of disagreements on the model of privatization of the economy to be followed in Slovenia. Soon afterwards, he quit the Slovenian Social Democratic Union.

In 1992, he became a member of the Democratic Party. After the party's failure to gain parliamentary representation in the 1996 elections, he quit politics.

In the late 1990s and early 2000s, he came back to the public life as a strong critic of Slovenia's membership in the European Union and NATO. In the mid-2000s, he engaged in frequent and virulent polemics with the younger generation of Slovenian liberal and neo-liberal economists (Mičo Mrkaić, Jože P. Damijan, Sašo Polanec, Igor Masten, Janez Šušteršič). Between 2004 and 2008, he frequently criticized the liberal economic policies of Janez Janša's center-right government.

Between 2001 and 2005, he served as rector of the University of Ljubljana. Mencinger was also a member of the Slovenian National Council for 5 years.

He was a member of the European Academy of Sciences and Arts and received the Golden Order of Freedom of the Republic of Slovenia. He also commented on the experience of privatization in Slovenia during the post-communist era.

Mencinger appeared in Boris Malagurski's documentary film The Weight of Chains, where he talked about the effects of Slovenia joining the European Union.

In 2014, he was chosen to head the Positive Slovenia's list of candidates to the European Parliament.
