= Montenegro: A Land Divided =

- Directed by: Boris Malagurski
- Screenplay by: Miloš Ninković
- Produced by: Boris Malagurski
- Starring: Stefan Popović
- Production companies: Malagurski Cinema; Filmosophy Association
- Release date: 21 May 2021 (Belgrade)
- Running time: 79 min
- Country: Serbia
- Languages: English, Serbian
- Budget: $106,996

Montenegro: A Land Divided (Serbian: Црна Гора: Подељена земља, romanized: Crna Gora: Podeljena zemlja) is a 2021 Serbian documentary film about the history and social divisions of Montenegro. Directed and produced by Serbian Canadian filmmaker Boris Malagurski, the film was released on May 21, 2021, in Belgrade, Serbia.

== Synopsis ==
The documentary asserts that Montenegro is deeply divided between Serbs and Montenegrins despite them coming from the same area and sharing the same history, religion and language. The film claims that the causes of these divisions are political and that influential figures in Montenegro regularly switched sides when it suited their political agenda. The film asserts that Montenegrin politician Sekula Drljević was a Serbian patriot while he was hoping to become Justice Minister in the government of the Kingdom of Serbs, Croats and Slovenes, but after failing to achieve his goal, he sided with the fascists during World War II and called Serbs "degenerates". Another example given is politician Milovan Đilas who, the film claims, while a high-ranking official of the League of Communists of Yugoslavia, participated in the creation of the Montenegrin nation, but after being kicked out of the party, he "became" a Serb again. The film claims that President of Montenegro Milo Đukanović used to be a Greater Serbian nationalist, after which he became a fighter for Montenegrin independence.

The film features an interview with Metropolitan Amfilohije of Montenegro and the Littoral, as well as interviews with prime minister of Montenegro Zdravko Krivokapić, minister of justice of Montenegro Vladimir Leposavić, Matija Bećković and historian Jovan Markuš.

== Production ==
Malagurski and his film crew were arrested on their first day of filming in Podgorica as they did not have a permit to film with a drone. After they were held by the police for four hours, the film crew were released and were able to continue filming.

During the film's production, Malagurski also stirred controversy on social media when he posted a photograph of himself in the town of Cetinje holding the State flag of the Kingdom of Montenegro, with the caption: "They tell us nobody had taken out the old flag of Montenegro in Cetinje in a long time. Nothing can stand without its roots. But how did this city become the epicenter of hatred towards its own roots?" Following the post, Malagurski reported receiving threats.

== Release ==
Following the world premiere, the film started being screened in Cineplexx Cinemas in Belgrade, Novi Sad, Kragujevac and Niš, with subsequent screenings that took place or are scheduled in cities across Serbia, Montenegro and Bosnia and Herzegovina.

== See also ==
- Serbs of Montenegro
- Montenegrins
