= Slobodna Television =

- Native name: Слободна Телевизија
- Company type: Private company
- Industry: Media
- Founded: 13 April 2019; 7 years ago
- Headquarters: Belgrade, Serbia
- Key people: Hana Adrović (Director)
- Services: Broadcast television
- Website: slobodna.rs

Slobodna Television (Serbian Cyrillic: Слободна Телевизија), meaning Freedom TV, is a television broadcaster based in Belgrade, Serbia.

== Background ==
Slobodna Television started broadcasting on April 13 2019, at 12:44 p.m. (a symbolism referring to UNSCR 1244) and, according to their mission statement, aims to present their audiences with information "free from political influence".

On November 6, 2019, Slobodna Television received permission from the Regulatory Agency for Electronic Media in Serbia for television broadcasting.

== Programmes ==
- Something Different, hosted by Hana Adrović
- Malagurski In Short, hosted by Boris Malagurski
- Conclusion, hosted by Marko Jeremić

== See also ==
- Media in Serbia
