= Carla Del Ponte =

Swiss prosecutor and diplomat (born 1947)

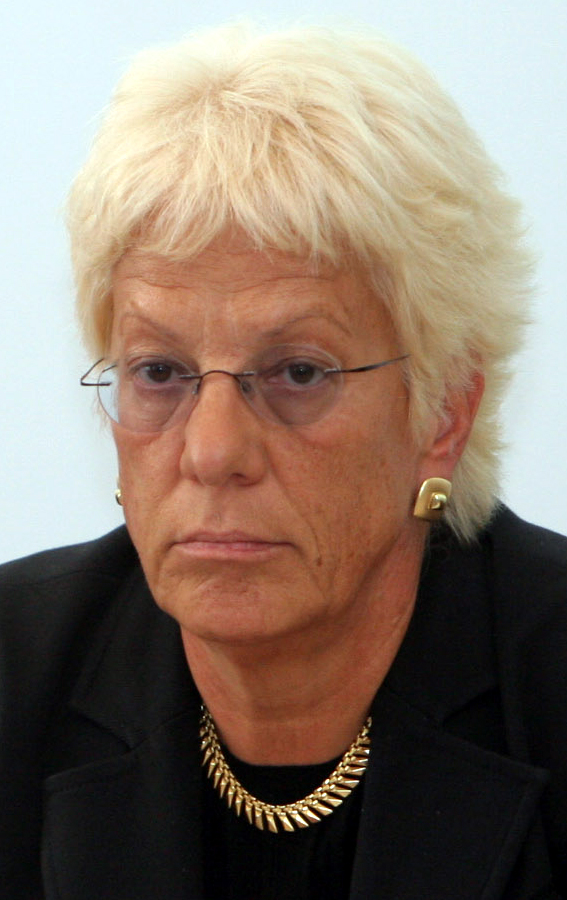
- Del Ponte in 2006
- Born: February 9, 1947 (age 79); Bignasco, Switzerland
- Occupation: former Chief Prosecutor of two United Nations international criminal law tribunals
- Children: 1

Carla Del Ponte (born February 9, 1947) is a Swiss former Chief Prosecutor of two United Nations international criminal law tribunals. A former Swiss attorney general, she was appointed prosecutor for the International Criminal Tribunal for the former Yugoslavia (ICTY) and the International Criminal Tribunal for Rwanda (ICTR) in August 1999, replacing Louise Arbour.

In 2003, the U.N. Security Council removed Del Ponte as the Prosecutor for the ICTR, and replaced her there with Hassan Bubacar Jallow following pressure from Rwanda's president Kagame who was obstructing her efforts to investigate crimes by Tutsi. She remained the Prosecutor for the ICTY until 1 January 2008, when she was succeeded by Serge Brammertz. Del Ponte was formerly married, and has one son.

Del Ponte served as Swiss ambassador to Argentina from 2008 to February 2011.

== Early life and education ==
Del Ponte was born in Bignasco, Switzerland, in 1947. Her first language is Italian and she speaks fluent German, French and English.

Del Ponte studied law in Bern and Geneva, as well as in the United Kingdom. She obtained her LL.M. in 1972. After completing her studies, Del Ponte joined a private law firm in Lugano, leaving in 1975 to set up her own practice.

== Career ==
=== Prosecutor in Switzerland ===
In 1981, Del Ponte was appointed an investigating magistrate, and later public prosecutor at the Lugano district attorney's office. As public prosecutor, she dealt with cases of money laundering, fraud, drug trafficking, arms smuggling, terrorism and espionage, often looking into the many international links forged in Switzerland's role as a global business centre.

During her time in office, Del Ponte became well known in Europe for breaking a Sicilian Mafia money-laundering operation in Switzerland, pursuing former Soviet bloc officials who may have been stowing illegal funds in Switzerland and investigating Swiss bankers suspected of misappropriating money, in some cases in collaboration with Latin Americans. She also produced the evidence for Pakistan to bring money-laundering charges against Benazir Bhutto, a former Prime Minister, and her husband, Asif Ali Zardari.

It was during that period that she and Investigative Judge Giovanni Falcone uncovered the link between Swiss money launderers and the Italian drug trade in the so-called "pizza connection." Judge Falcone was killed in the Capaci bombing. Del Ponte was more fortunate as half a tonne of explosives planted in the foundations of her Palermo home were discovered in time for her to escape the attempted assassination unhurt. Falcone's death nurtured Del Ponte's resolve to fight organised crime. Her enemies in the Cosa Nostra call her "La Puttana" ("the whore"). She therefore became the first public figure in Switzerland to require round-the-clock protection and an armour-plated car.

In the late 1990s, Del Ponte and Yuri Skuratov with Filipe Turover providing evidence investigated Russian corruption involving high-ranking Russian officials. Earlier, both Italian and German Tax officials had started investigations. In early 2000, Filipe Turover sent messages from his residence in Switzerland to Moscow prosecutors "I'm ready to talk about Putin. Always your Turover." (Russian: "Готов говорить о Путине. Всегда ваш Туровер.") Although the initial investigations were headed by Skuratov and Georgy Timofeyevich Chuglazov (Russian: Георгий Тимофеевич Чуглазов), Chuglazov was promoted to adviser to the Prosecutor General of Russia by Vladimir Ustinov, who replaced Skuratov as Prosecutor General of Russia after Boris Yeltsin fired Skuratov on 2 April 1999; Chuglazov was taken off the case just days before he was to travel to Switzerland in August to depose witnesses and to receive bank and other documents. The Russian prosecutor Ruslan Tamaev headed the Russian investigations which ended when his half brothers Hasan and Hussein were charged with illegal possession of drugs and weapons and he was subsequently removed from investigations. A few months later the charges against his half-brothers were dropped. Vladimir Putin appointed Pavel Borodin to the diplomatic post of Secretary of the State of the Russia—Belarus Union (Russian: госсекретаря союзного государства Россия--Белоруссия) which gave Borodin diplomatic immunity from prosecution and ended further investigations into Borodin's criminal activities.

In 1999, Del Ponte suffered a setback when Switzerland's highest court overturned the confiscation by her office of $90 million from Swiss accounts belonging to Raúl Salinas de Gortari, the brother of a former President of Mexico. The court ruled that Del Ponte had no authority to seize the $90 million only on the suspicion that it included money from drug trafficking. But the ruling did not absolve Salinas of the charges.

=== Career at the ICTY and ICTR ===
After serving for five years as Switzerland's attorney general, in 1999 Del Ponte joined the ICTY and ICTR to deal with war crimes as a prosecutor. Del Ponte was the first experienced prosecutor to hold the job on the war crimes tribunals; her predecessors, Louise Arbour and Richard Goldstone, were both judges. At the time, Switzerland was not a member of the United Nations, which was considered an advantage for Del Ponte.

As reported by Reuters on March 18, 2003, according to Del Ponte, Serbian Prime Minister Zoran Đinđić had predicted his own assassination on February 17, just weeks before it happened on March 12, 2003.

In August 2003, after being on the Rwandan genocide case for four years, Del Ponte was removed from the appointment for political reasons and replaced by Hassan Bubacar Jallow. Carla De Ponte stated that she had fallen foul of President Kagame because she insisted also on prosecuting the alleged war crimes of President Paul Kagame's Rwandan Patriotic Front.

In an interview in Intellectum website in 2004 she boldly stated that she would like to try in ICTY Bin Laden and Saddam Hussein.

In 2005, she accused the Vatican of helping Croatia's most wanted war crimes suspect Ante Gotovina evade capture. He has since been acquitted of all charges by ICTY. The Croatian Bishops' Conference, which heads the Croatian Roman Catholic Church, dismissed Del Ponte's allegations. Its spokesman Antun Suljic said the conference "has no knowledge or indications of the whereabouts" of General Gotovina.

On January 30, 2007 Del Ponte announced her intention to resign as Chief Prosecutor at the ICTY at the end of the year, stating it was "time to return to normal life." She was succeeded by Serge Brammertz on January 1, 2008.

=== Career as Swiss diplomat ===
Del Ponte served as Switzerland's Ambassador to Argentina from January 2008 until early 2011.

== Post-retirement ==
From September 2012 to August 2017, Del Ponte was a member of the Independent International Commission of Inquiry on the Syrian Arab Republic, under the auspices of the UN High Commissioner for Human Rights.

In May 2013, she accused the Syrian rebels of using chemical weapons, a view diametrically opposed by the majority of Western government officials. She stated, "We still have to deepen our investigation, verify and confirm (the findings) through new witness testimony, but according to what we have established so far, it is at the moment opponents of the regime who are using sarin gas." The following day, in an apparent reaction to Del Ponte's comments, the Commission issued a press release clarifying that it "has not reached conclusive findings as to the use of chemical weapons in Syria by any parties in the conflict".

In March 2014, the Commission published a report that stated that the chemical agents used in the Khan al-Assal chemical attack bore "the same unique hallmarks as those used in Al-Ghouta" in the August 2013 chemical attack. The report also indicated, based on "evidence available concerning the nature, quality and quantity of the agents used" that the perpetrators of the Al-Ghouta attack "likely had access to the chemical weapons stockpile of the Syrian military". In none of the incidents, however, was the commission's "evidentiary threshold" met in regard to identifying the perpetrators of the chemical attacks.

In August 2017, Del Ponte resigned from the commission, due to frustration at the lack of support from the international community: “We could not obtain from the international community and the Security Council a resolution putting in place a tribunal, an ad hoc tribunal for all the crimes that are committed in Syria... Seven years of crime in Syria and total impunity. That is not acceptable.” She blamed Russia for vetoing action: "Now a prosecutor should continue our work and bring the war criminals before a special court. But that is exactly what Russia is blocking with its veto in the U.N. Security Council". She said that the commission has gathered enough evidence for president al-Assad to be convicted of war crimes. Del Ponte told Syria's ambassador that she had been right to quickly reach the conclusion that Assad's government used chemical weapons during an attack on the town of Khan Sheikhoun in April 2017.

== Controversy ==
=== Comments on NATO ===
In late December 1999, in an interview with The Observer in London, Del Ponte was asked if she was prepared to press criminal charges against NATO personnel in Kosovo for alleged war crimes committed by pilots and their commanders. She replied, "If I am not willing to do that, I am not in the right place. I must give up my mission".

That was followed by various negative official responses, military and civilian, from the US and Canada. Del Ponte's office subsequently issued a statement dated four days later: "NATO is not under investigation by the Office of the Prosecutor of the ICTY. There is no formal inquiry into the actions of NATO during the conflict in Kosovo".

=== Organ smuggling allegations ===
In 2008, Del Ponte published a book The Hunt in which she claimed that the Kosovo Albanians had smuggled human organs of kidnapped Serbs after the Kosovo war ended in 1999. Her book created an international controversy. The International Criminal Tribunal for the former Yugoslavia stated on Del Ponte's allegations: "The Tribunal is aware of very serious allegations of human organ trafficking raised by the former Prosecutor, Carla Del Ponte, in a book recently published in Italian under her name. No evidence in support of such allegations was ever brought before the Tribunal’s judges."

On 4 April 2008, Human Rights Watch asked Kosovar Prime Minister Hashim Thaci and Albanian Prime Minister Sali Berisha to open investigations on the matter under international supervision. They ignored the letters and instead publicly rejected Del Ponte's claims as unsubstantiated. On 5 May 2008, Human Rights Watch called the Del Ponte allegations "serious and credible" and publicly called on Tirana and Pristina to cooperate.

Del Ponte alleged that the victims were more than 300 Serbs missing from the war. "Serious and credible allegations have emerged about horrible abuses in Kosovo and Albania after the war," said Fred Abrahams, HRW Senior emergencies researcher of HRW.

According to the journalists' information, the abducted individuals were held in warehouses and other buildings, including facilities in Kukës and Tropojë. In comparison to other captives, some of the sources said, some of the younger, healthier detainees were fed, examined by doctors, and never beaten. These abducted individuals - an unknown number – were allegedly transferred to a yellow house in or around the Albanian town of Burrel, where doctors extracted the captives' internal organs. These organs were then transported out of Albania via the airport near the capital Tirana. Most of the alleged victims were Serbs who went missing after the arrival of UN and NATO forces in Kosovo. But other captives were women from Kosovo, Albania, Russia, and other Slavic countries.

In 2008, the Parliamentary Assembly of the Council of Europe authorized an investigation and employed Dick Marty to report the findings to the Parliament.

According to a draft Council of Europe report cited by The Daily Telegraph, Prime Minister Hashim Thaci was one of the key players in the traffic of organs of Serb prisoners after the 1998–99 conflict.

In November 2012, Ramush Haradinaj, a commander of the Kosovo Liberation Army before becoming prime minister, and all of the accused in the matter were acquitted for the second time of the accusations.

Del Ponte talked about the issue in Boris Malagurski's documentary film The Weight of Chains 2 (2014). In the interview, she claimed that the UN Mission in Kosovo did not provide the Hague Tribunal with the necessary evidence regarding organ trafficking in Kosovo and that "NATO and the KLA, as allies in the war, couldn't act against each other".

== Awards ==
- 2017 Hessian Peace Prize
