= Kosovo: A Moment in Civilization =

- Film poster
- Directed by: Boris Malagurski
- Screenplay by: Miloš Ninković
- Produced by: Boris Malagurski
- Starring: Stefan Popović; Sava Janjić
- Production companies: Malagurski Cinema; Filmosophy Association
- Release date: 15 September 2017 (Paris)
- Running time: 46 min
- Country: Serbia
- Language: English

Kosovo: A Moment in Civilization (Serbian: Косово: Моменат у цивилизацији, romanized: Kosovo: Momenat u civilizaciji) is a 2017 Serbian documentary film about Serbia's UNESCO heritage in Kosovo. Directed and produced by Serbian Canadian filmmaker Boris Malagurski, the film was released on September 15, 2017 at a Serbian cultural centre in Paris. The film is Malagurski's second documentary film made about Kosovo, the first was 2009 film Kosovo: Can You Imagine? and was sponsored by the Serbian government.

== Synopsis ==
The film starts off with the host, Stefan Popović, presenting the Gračanica Monastery, its history and significance for not only Serbs who built it, but civilization as a whole. Popović talks about his childhood and how he used to often visit the monastery.

He then moves on to the Our Lady of Ljeviš Serbian Orthodox Church in Prizren, built in the 14th century, converted into a mosque during the Ottoman Empire and then back into a church in the early 20th century. Popović talks about the damaged frescoes in the church and how the church was burned during the 2004 unrest in Kosovo.

The Patriarchal Monastery of Peć is presented next, with Popović explaining the significance of it to Orthodox Serbs throughout history, but also the struggles it went through. He describes the changes that happened to the monastery and its surroundings since he visited it before the Kosovo War.

Popović then visits the Visoki Dečani monastery and talks about his first visit to that monastery as a child. Popović interviews Archimandrite Sava (Janjić), who talks about the importance of this monastery for mankind, as well as the attacks that were carried out against it by extremists.

Popović's final message relates to asking UNESCO not to admit Kosovo into its membership, as he claims that the Government of Kosovo is a threat to the monasteries and that, according to him, those who have attacked cultural heritage sites cannot be entrusted with their protection.

== Release ==
=== Theatrical ===
Following the world premiere in Paris, the film had its Serbian premiere on September 22, 2017 at the crypt of the Church of Saint Sava in Belgrade. Subsequent screenings took place in Bosnia and Herzegovina (Banja Luka), Russia (Moscow), Australia (Sydney, Melbourne), Sweden (Stockholm), the United States (Chicago, Miami, New York, Washington, D.C., Boston), Canada (Toronto), Switzerland (Zürich), Austria (Vienna, Innsbruck, Linz), Montenegro (Podgorica), Slovenia (Ljubljana), the Czech Republic (Prague), Croatia (Zagreb) as well in other cities in Serbia (Subotica, Niš).

=== Television ===
The documentary was broadcast on Radio Television of Serbia in March 2018.

== Reception ==
The film was condemned by Prime Minister of Kosovo Ramush Haradinaj, who described the film as an offensive gesture, timed deliberately to undermine Kosovo's bid to join UNESCO. The Office of the Prime Minister of Kosovo also disputed the idea that Serb monuments and churches in Kosovo were Serbian property. Serbia's Director of the Office for Kosovo and Metohija, Marko Đurić, which had supported the filming of the documentary, noted that Haradinaj's condemnation was "great recognition for the film", congratulating the film team and vowing to "further support projects that uncover the truth about our heritage in Kosovo and Metohija."

In April 2018, the film's screening in Zagreb received negative reaction from the Croatian news websites.

== See also ==
- Medieval Monuments in Kosovo
- Destruction of Serbian heritage in Kosovo
