= Srpska: The Struggle for Freedom =

2022 Serbian-Canadian film

- Directed by: Boris Malagurski
- Screenplay by: Miloš Ninković
- Produced by: Boris Malagurski
- Starring: Stefan Popović, Emir Kusturica
- Production company: Malagurski Cinema
- Release date: 1 October 2022 (Banja Luka)
- Running time: 93 min
- Countries: Canada, Serbia
- Languages: English, Serbian
- Budget: $182,989

Srpska: The Struggle for Freedom (Serbian: Република Српска: Борба за слободу) is a 2022 documentary film about the history of Serbs of Bosnia and Herzegovina. Directed and produced by Serbian Canadian filmmaker Boris Malagurski, the film was released on October 1, 2022, in Banja Luka, Bosnia and Herzegovina. The film includes an interview with Sarajevo-born film director Emir Kusturica.

== Synopsis ==
The film starts with the beginnings of organized institutions in the areas around the source and lower course of the river Bosna, chronicling the rise of the medieval Bosnian state. The film later presents the fate of the Serbs inhabiting the land as intertwined with that of the Ottoman Empire and, eventually, Austria-Hungary’s fate, with the assassination of Archduke Franz Ferdinand in Sarajevo sparking World War I.

The film then documents the role that this land played in the first Yugoslav state – the Kingdom of Serbs, Croats, and Slovenes, which later became the Kingdom of Yugoslavia. The suffering of the people, predominantly Serbs, Jews, Roma, and others, during World War II is presented in the film, together with a more peaceful and prosperous time that followed, under the Socialist Federal Republic of Yugoslavia as led by Josip Broz Tito.

The film explains the principles according to which socialist Yugoslavia was organized, and also describes the stated goals of that state, which aspired to provide "centuries of peace" for the region. The 1984 Winter Olympics in Sarajevo is a theme that runs throughout the film, as an example of what the people of the region could achieve when they put their differences aside and worked together for the common good and healthy competition.

The events that lead to the bloody wars in the former Yugoslavia are explained briefly and chronologically from the beginning to the end of the war in Bosnia and Herzegovina with the signing of the Dayton Agreement in 1995 that led to the formation of the entity called Republika Srpska.

== Release ==
On October 9, 2022, five days before the scheduled Western European tour of Srpska: The Struggle for Freedom was scheduled to start in Lucerne, Switzerland, the Canadian Institute for the Research of Genocide (IGK) launched a petition to ban screenings of the film, saying it "revises the painful history of Bosnia" and that the film "denies the Bosnian genocide and the laws and verdicts of international courts and the United Nations".

On October 11, the Mothers of Srebrenica condemned the film, saying it "denies genocide" and denies "aggression against the state of Bosnia and Herzegovina". They were particularly offended that some scenes had been filmed at the Srebrenica Memorial Centre.

The production company responded by saying that the campaign against the film started before the film had been released, meaning that the claims made about the film were not the result of analysis of the film's content, but rather a part of an anti-Serbian agenda. Nevertheless, several screenings in Europe were postponed or moved to other locations due to, what Malagurski said were "security concerns", as "threats included a man vowing to blow up every cinema that dares screen the film".

On October 15, Tages-Anzeiger journalist Anielle Peterhans wrote that "Malagurski does not conceal the genocide of Srebrenica. In the film he clearly calls it the worst mass murder of mankind since World War II". Aleksandra Hiltmann, of the same paper was critical of the film, calling Malagurski a "propagandist" and the film "problematic", adding that "the film presents events, facts and interpretations of the Bosnian War of the 1990s in an extremely selective manner" Swiss People's Party politician Christoph Mörgeli accused Tages-Anzeiger of helping Bosnian and Albanian organizations to cancel the documentary, noting that the newspaper neglected to ask the activists if they "had seen the film at all".

The Lemkin Institute for Genocide Prevention also condemned the film for "genocide denial and an outrageous misrepresentation of documented historical facts". The film's production company noted that "in the film, we denounce all war crimes that took place in the Bosnian War of the 1990s, with our team filming at the Srebrenica Memorial, condemning what happened there as "the largest single act of mass-killing in the Yugoslav Wars, and the worst in Europe since World War II" and adding that the Hague Tribunal, in its verdict" declared that "what happened in Srebrenica constituted genocide", without negating this."

Hessischer Rundfunk journalist Daniel Majic, wrote that the film was a "feel-good movie for Serbian nationalists who don't even try to hide their concerns", and although "genocide is not denied ... instead of letting his narrator speak of a genocide, he merely states that the Srebrenica massacre was assessed as such by the International Criminal Court in The Hague". Malagurski gave an interview to Sarajevo-based O Kanal, in which head of superdesk, Kenan Ćosić, who saw the film prior to the interview, confirmed that the film doesn't deny genocide, with Malagurski saying that he insisted on his film team visiting Potočari (Srebrenica), "to pay their respects to those killed." Bosnian journalist, Vildana Selimbegović (editor-in-chief of the daily Oslobođenje) wrote that "the Bosnian War is discussed for 5–6 minutes [in the film]. And in those couple of minutes, the film found place for the verdict of the Tribunal about the genocide in Srebrenica and that the debate about that verdict is still going on."

A campaigner against the film told Al-Jazeera that six days of screenings had been cancelled in 19 European cities. Cancellations included Salzburg, Offenbach am Main, Stuttgart, Düsseldorf, Dortmund, Klagenfurt, Brussels and Antwerp. However, according to Malagurski Cinema and other sources, as of February 6, 2023, the film had been screened in Lucerne, Zurich, Uster, Bern, Stuttgart, Vienna, Višegrad, St. Gallen, Dortmund, Rotterdam, Antwerpen, Frankfurt, and Stockholm, as well as locations in Serbia and Republika Srpska.

== See also ==
- Serbs of Bosnia and Herzegovina
