= Revolucija (TV series) =

Serbian television series

- Also known as: Revolution
- Presented by: Boris Malagurski
- Country of origin: Serbia
- Original language: Serbian
- No. of seasons: 3
- No. of episodes: 55

Original release
- Network: Happy TV
- Release: January 27, 2013 – January 2015

Revolucija (Serbian Cyrillic: Револуција, English: Revolution) is a Serbian satirical television series hosted by Boris Malagurski on Happy TV from January 2013 to January 2015. Three seasons were broadcast.

== Background ==
Following Milomir Marić's interview with Boris Malagurski for the "Cyrillic" show on Happy TV, Malagurski pitched Marić his idea for a TV show called Revolution of Awareness. Marić suggested to Malagurski that he should shorten the title to just Revolution and that he should film a pilot episode. The owner of Happy TV liked the pilot episode and Revolucija started in 2013.

== Conception ==
The show, in which the host, Boris Malagurski, interviewed state officials, foreign and local experts in a television studio, also featured documentary segments in which Malagurski talked with ordinary citizens in Serbia and dealt with problems in Serbian society. According to the author, the purpose of the show was not to just talk about problems in Serbian society, but to take action to change them. He noted that the "show itself will only initiate the actions, but then it's up to the citizens to move things forward". At the end of every show, Malagurski called citizens to contact him and notify his team about the problems they're facing so that they may try to deal with them together. The author stressed that the goal was not for him to fix other people's problems, but to give them ideas and present ways in which they can solve issues themselves.

== Notable episodes ==
=== The Presumption of Justice broadcast ===
In April 2013, The Presumption of Justice, a documentary film directed by Boris Malagurski and Ivana Rajović, dealing with the 2009 death of a French football fan, Brice Taton, and alleged inconsistencies in the subsequent court case in Serbia.

After the premiere, Malagurski discussed the film with guests in the studio, who included co-director Ivana Rajović, lawyers Branislav Tapušković and Zora Dobričanin, and Dragan Crepulja, an alleged witness who had not been called to testify at subsequent court case. The film also sparked a threats controversy.

=== "Anemija" situation ===
In April 2014, Malagurski attempted to interview Radovanka Predragović Stevanić, the Director of the Institute for Specialized Rehabilitation (known as "Anemija") in Ivanjica, regarding complaints against her by colleagues and former employees at "Anemija". When Malagurski knocked on the door of her office, she refused to open it and the police showed up to escort Malagurski and his TV crew off the premises. Following the broadcast, the Vice President of the Board of Director of "Anemija", Miloš Jovićević, resigned, noting that the fact that the Director and her Legal Adviser called the police on the TV crew was "scandalous". The Director, Radovanka Predragović Stevanić, announced a lawsuit against Happy TV because its TV crew was allegedly "trying to enter forcibly", which Malagurski denied, saying "the footage clearly shows that we were calmly standing and knocking on the door of a public institution as representatives of a media outlet."

=== Prokupac break-in ===
In June 2014, Malagurski and his TV crew went to the Prokupac factory in the Voždovac municipality of Belgrade to support the workers who had been laid off and protesting in front of the factory. Malagurski asked the security officer to open the gate, which he refused, so Malagurski jumped over the gate, while the workers forcefully opened it and streamed into the factory grounds, together with the TV crew. The police quickly showed up, as well as the bankruptcy trustee, who refused to talk in front of cameras, and after several tense moments, the situation deescalated and the workers got a chance to talk to the bankruptcy trustee.

=== Workers' rights at Yura ===
In July 2014, Malagurski interviewed two workers at the South Korean-owned Yura Corporation operating in the Serbian city of Niš, Nemanja Vasiljević and Marijan Jeftović, about alleged workers' rights infringements at the company. Vasiljević told Malagurski that he has seen "women on the production line fainting" and that "workers have to sign out whenever they want to go to the toilet". They both complained that Yura wasn't allowing them to form a union, which is a constitutional right of every worker in Serbia. Malagurski then proceeded to approach the Yura Corporation Niš headquarters gate with a copy of the Constitution of Serbia, translated to Korean, in an attempt to give the Constitution to the owners of the company. Though Malagurski was able to pass through the gate and enter the building, security asked Malagurski to exit the premises and members of Serbia's gendarmery didn't allow Malagurski to enter again. Nobody from the company was willing to take the copy of the constitution.

== Controversies ==
=== Kostić allegations ===
In January 2013, Malagurski interviewed Vesna Kostić of the World Bank office in Belgrade for his show. After the interview was broadcast, Kostić wrote a letter of complaint to the Association of Journalists of Serbia, alleging that Malagurski had "forged" a conversation. According to Kostić, Malagurski "pasted" the answer to one question, into the response to a different question, which Kostić said was a violation of the code of journalistic ethics.

Malagurski replied on his Facebook page that he "didn't forge anything", but that Kostic either "forgot how she answered the questions" or had "bad intentions". On his Facebook page, he offered to show Kostić the unedited interview.

=== Censorship allegations ===
In December 2013, an episode of Revolution was, according to the author, not allowed to air on Happy TV. "I was told by Happy TV representatives that the Chief of Staff of Mlađan Dinkić called the TV station and was very angry," said Malagurski and added "Happy TV asked me to edit out parts of the show, which I refused."

The episode in question concerned money moved from Serbia to Cyprus in the 1990s, how Mobtel was privatized and why bank interest rates were so high in Serbia. Croatian journalist Domagoj Matgetić and Branko Dragaš were due to be guests in the programme.

== Cancellation ==
In January 2015, the show was cancelled, Malagurski claims to have received no official reason for the cancellation, when asked by reporters about the issue, he replied "maybe you should ask Happy TV".

== See also ==
- Globalno (talk show)
