= The Presumption of Justice =

- Directed by: Boris Malagurski; Ivana Rajović
- Screenplay by: Boris Malagurski; Ivana Rajović
- Produced by: Boris Malagurski
- Production company: Malagurski Cinema
- Release date: 29 June 2012 (Serbia)
- Running time: 41 minutes
- Country: Serbia
- Languages: English, Serbian, French

The Presumption of Justice is a 2012 documentary film, directed by Boris Malagurski and Ivana Rajović, it deals with the September 2009 murder of Brice Taton, a fan of Toulouse FC, who travelled to Belgrade, Serbia in order to support his club in its UEFA Europa League away match versus FK Partizan. The film focuses on the subsequent court case in Serbia which, resulted in a dozen FK Partizan fans being convicted of the crime. It argues that the handling of the case was negligent at both its investigative and trial stages, resulting in a miscarriage of justice in the case of Stefan Veličković, one of the 12 convicted fans.

== Synopsis ==
The film focuses on an incident in which French football fan Brice Taton died in Belgrade, and which led to 12 young people being sentenced to a total of 115 years of prison. On September 17, 2009, a fight broke out on Obilićev venac Square when Partizan fans attacked several Toulouse fans, which - the film claims - led to Brice Taton falling off a ledge and dying in a hospital ten days later. According to the director Ivana Rajović, one of the Partizan fans, Stefan Veličković, couldn't have been a part of the fight, because he was getting a traffic violation ticket in Makedonska street several blocks away at the time the fight was taking place. In spite of Stefan having an alibi, he was sentenced to seven years in prison.

The film chronicles several alleged inconsistencies between the statements of the accused and the court findings in the case, analyzing whether Taton was thrown off a ledge or had fallen while running away from the fight.

The film alleges the trial was finished with record speed, and that the verdict didn't explain what happened that day, since none of the evidence provided answers to how Brice Taton fell off the ledge. The film comes to the conclusion that the media and state and legal institutions misrepresented the case, and attempts to explain why this happened.

== Release ==
=== Theatrical ===
The film premiered in Belgrade on June 29, 2012, with subsequent showings in Subotica, Novi Sad, Niš, Bačka Palanka, Zrenjanin, Pančevo, Sremski Karlovci, Nova Pazova and other cities.

While promoting his film, Malagurski stated that the Serbian media coverage of the case, specifically instances of the suspects being referred to as the "murderers who need to be punished severely" before the trial even began, whipped up the mass sentiments for political ends and created a societal atmosphere not conducive to determining facts and carrying out justice. He called the court case itself "the biggest disgrace of the Serbian justice system".

=== Television ===
The film had its broadcasting premiere in April 2013 as a part of Malagurski's TV show on Happy TV, which also featured an interview with an alleged witness, Dragan Crepulja, who was not called to testify. In the interview, Crepulja claimed that he "saw it when the now deceased Taton fell, there was nobody next to him, not on the stairs, not by his side... I was two metres close to Taton when he fell, I immediately looked around, up and down, there was no one there, I can confirm that. I told this to the police officers who came."

== Threats controversy ==
In September 2012, the film's co-directors Boris Malagurski and Ivana Rajović filed a criminal investigation request with the Belgrade public prosecutor's office against 12 members of the Parapsihopatologija internet message board for alleged "organized threats to their life and personal and professional safety", made under online forum nicknames after the premiere of The Presumption of Justice. Upon investigation that began in July 2013, three of the 12 individuals (Rastislav Dinić, Nemanja Poleksić, and Marko Nikolić), whose real-life identities were determined via local internet providers, were charged by the Belgrade prosecutor's office. In March 2014, Dinić, Poleksić, and Nikolić were found guilty by the Higher Court in Belgrade, each being sentenced to a year in prison, suspended for 3 years of probation. After the court decision was declared, it was criticized by Milica Jovanović and Dario Hajrić writing on Peščanik as well as Jovana Gligorijević writing in Vreme. They opined that Dinić's, Poleksić's, and Nikolić's online remarks didn't constitute threats but merely insults while Gligorijević further criticized various aspects of the production and financing of The Presumption of Justice.

Malagurski's response to Gligorijević's piece was published in Vreme in early April 2014, disputing Gligorijević's claims about the movie's production and financing. A few days later, a piece by Malagurski was published in Nova srpska politička misao, criticizing what he saw to be a tendency on the part of the Serbian politicians and media outlets that otherwise consider themselves to be liberal, civic-minded, and to be espousing Western values to characterize him as a "crybaby" over his decision to file a criminal investigation request for receiving online threats. In a Politika op-ed, historian Čedomir Antić criticized those in the Serbian public whose criticism of Malagurski was based on his decision to file a criminal investigation request for receiving online threats. Antić also criticized the then VP of the Government of Vojvodina Goran Ješić for saying that Ješić, as Antić quoted Ješić's Twitter comment, "endorses everything they wrote", noting that their online remarks included threats of "explaining some things to Malagurski with a metal rod on his face", "closing one or both of Malagurski's eyes", and "advocating sexual violence against Malagurski and Rajović".

== Interviewees ==
- Radmila Dragičević Dičić – President of the Court of Appeal in Belgrade
- Tomo Zorić – spokesman for the Public Prosecutor of Serbia
- Milan Škulić – criminology professor at the University of Belgrade's Faculty of Law
- Zora Dobričanin-Nikodinović – Belgrade based lawyer
- Slobodan Batričević – Veličković family lawyer
- Slobodan Georgijev – Belgrade based journalist
- Veran Matić – former CEO of TV B92
- Loïc Tregoures – Assistant professor at the Université Lille II
