= The Weight of Chains 3 =

2019 film by Boris Malagurski

- Directed by: Boris Malagurski
- Produced by: Boris Malagurski
- Production company: Malagurski Cinema
- Release date: 2019
- Running time: 123 minutes
- Country: Canada
- Languages: English, Serbian
- Budget: $89,286

The Weight of Chains 3 is a 2019 Canadian documentary film directed by Boris Malagurski, dealing with the issue of how the military-industrial complex, big business and political interest groups endanger peoples’ health and existence, focusing on Serbia. As the third installment of The Weight of Chains trilogy, the film deals with NATO's use of depleted uranium munitions during the bombing of Yugoslavia in 1999, the environmental disaster that this allegedly caused and systemic issues that prevent people from taking democratic control over their countries. The film also discusses related topics in Cuba, Chile, Italy and Bolivia. The film premiered as a part of the DOK International Feature Documentary Film Festival in Belgrade.

== Synopsis ==
Narrated by Malagurski, the film starts by detailing how and why the United States Army started using depleted uranium in its munitions, against the backdrop of nuclear weapons testing in the Pacific and the nuclear arms race during the Cold War. It then discusses the effects of US use of depleted uranium during the Gulf War in Iraq and Kuwait and presents this as a trial run before the use of depleted uranium in Bosnia and Herzegovina in 1995 and the Federal Republic of Yugoslavia in 1999. The documentary then goes on to present NATO's bombing of Yugoslav chemical factories and oil refineries as "crimes against the environment". Through interviews with Serbian and Italian military and medical experts, the film suggests that NATO knowingly turned the Balkans into an experimental laboratory in which KFOR soldiers and civilian populations were human guinea pigs.

The documentary moves on to assess the potential threat coming from genetically modified organisms, small hydro plants, air pollution and climate change, advocating that the neoliberal system is to blame for the ongoing destruction of the environment. The film gives a brief history of how that system was imposed in Serbia, through interviews with current government and opposition representatives, as well as economic experts. Detailing the rise of Serbian president Aleksandar Vučić and several of his government's affairs, the film suggests that change is no longer a matter of choice, but a question of survival. The documentary presents positive examples of countries that were able to change their political and economic systems but also shows stories of rebellion in Serbia itself, in which small groups of well-organized individuals were able to beat the system, which the author considers "rotten".

== Interviewees ==
- Noam Chomsky, American philosopher, social critic, and political activist
- Jeffrey Sachs, American economist and public policy analyst
- Katrín Jakobsdóttir, Icelandic prime minister
- Nele Karajlić, Serbian musician
- Danica Grujičić, Serbian health minister
- Aleksandar Jovanović Ćuta, Serbian environmental and political activist
- Miladin Ševarlić, Serbian agricultural economist
- Saša Radulović, Serbian politician and economist
- Vladimir Đukanović, Serbian politician, lawyer and talk show host

== Controversy ==
Controversy sparked after the Film Center of Serbia refused to support the film noting that the film was "too scientific and investigative" with too much of an emphasis on "social activism". Malagurski filed a complaint with the Serbian Ministry of Culture, claiming that the reasons given for funding refusal were illegal and went against the rules and regulations for funding film projects. The Ministry agreed that the Film Center of Serbia broke the rules and annulled the results of that competition. Despite this, The Weight of Chains 3 did not receive funding from the Film Center of Serbia.

A minor clash erupted before the New York City premiere of the film when a group of Albanians gathered to protest against Malagurski and his film in front of the SVA Theater in Manhattan. According to Malagurski, the Albanian demonstrators were chanting in favor of the Kosovo Liberation Army, one Albanian protester was arrested by the NYPD, while Malagurski received a police escort to the cinema, after which he dedicated the premiere to the NYPD.
