= Michael Parenti =

American academic (1933–2026)

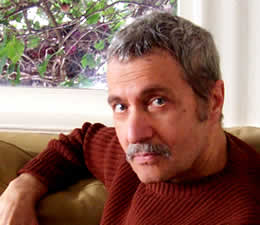
- Parenti in 2004
- Born: September 30, 1933; New York City, U.S.
- Died: January 24, 2026 (aged 92); Amherst, Massachusetts, U.S.
- Occupations: Political scientist; author; historian; activist
- Spouse: Susan Parenti
- Children: Christian Parenti
- Awards: Career Achievement Award; Certificate of Special Congressional Recognition; Lifetime Achievement Award – American Book Awards

Education
- Education: City College of New York (BA); Brown University (MA); Yale University (PhD)
- Thesis: Ethnic and Political Attitudes: A Depth Study of Italian Americans (1962)
- Doctoral advisor: Robert E. Lane

Philosophical work
- School: Marxism
- Institutions: List: University of Vermont; Sarah Lawrence College; Stony Brook University; University at Albany, SUNY; University of Canterbury
- Main interests: Socialism · Imperialism · Political economy · Media · Ideology · Communism
- Notable works: Democracy for the Few; Inventing Reality; Dirty Truths; Blackshirts and Reds; To Kill a Nation; Superpatriotism
- Website: michael-parenti.org

Michael John Parenti (September 30, 1933 – January 24, 2026) was an American political scientist, academic historian and cultural critic who wrote on scholarly and popular subjects. He taught at universities and also ran for political office. Parenti was well known for his Marxist writings and lectures, and was an intellectual of the American Left.

== Education and early life ==
Michael Parenti was born on September 30, 1933, to an Italian-American working-class family in the East Harlem neighborhood of New York City. After graduating from high school, Parenti worked for several years. Upon returning to school, he received a BA from the City College of New York. He was awarded a teaching fellowship at Brown University where he earned an MA in history in 1957. He completed his Ph.D. in political science at Yale University.

== Career ==
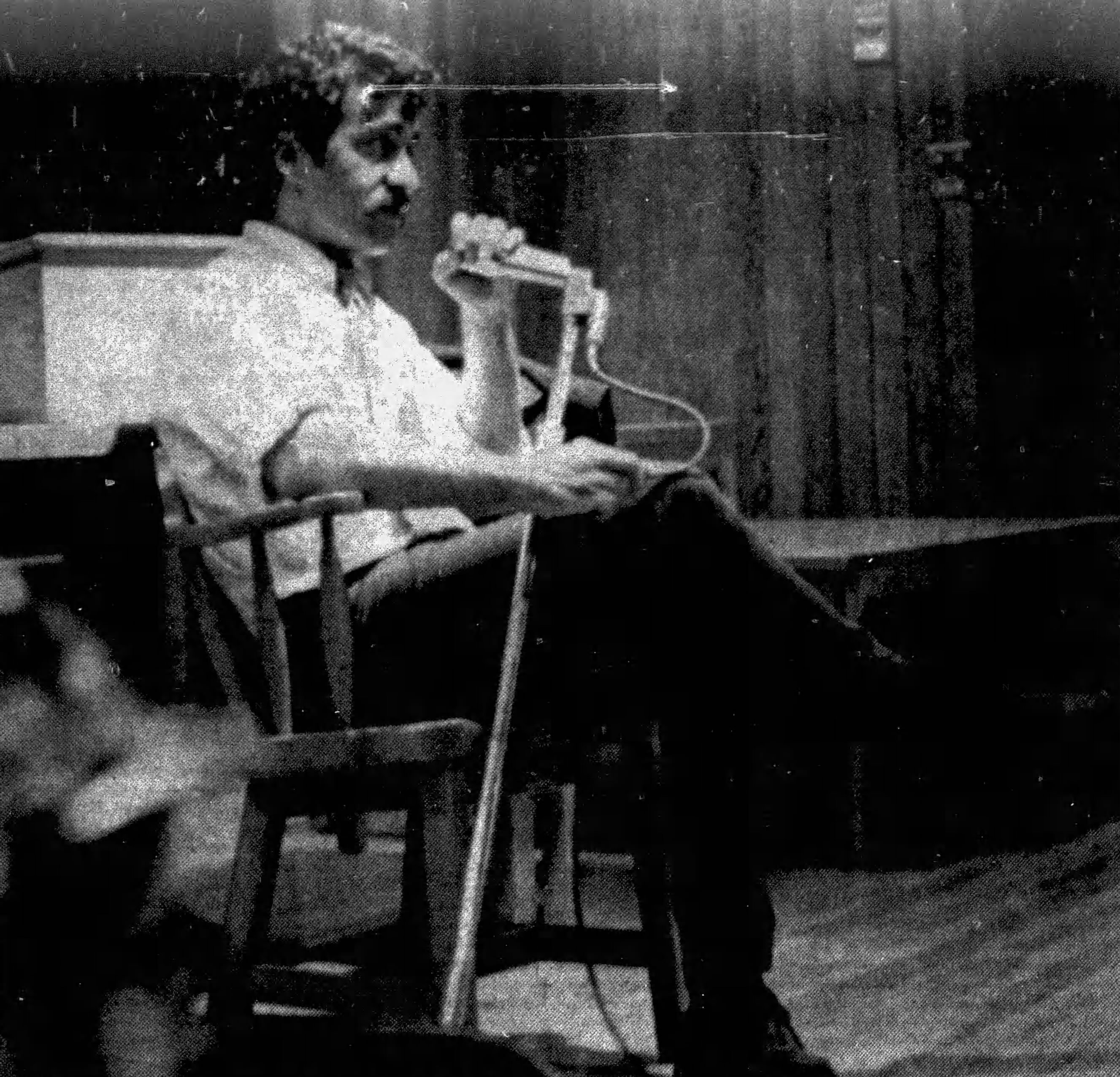
Parenti lecturing at the University of Vermont, October 23, 1970

Following completion of his doctorate, Parenti taught political and social science at various institutions of higher learning, including the University of Illinois Urbana-Champaign (UI). In May 1970 while he was an associate professor at UI, he participated in a rally protesting the recent Kent State shootings and ongoing Vietnam War. At the rally he was severely clubbed by state troopers and then held in a jail cell for two days. He was charged with aggravated battery (of a state trooper), disorderly conduct, and resisting arrest. After being released on bond, he started a new teaching job at the University of Vermont (UVM) in September. The next month he returned to Illinois to stand trial before a judge. According to Parenti, despite multiple witnesses offering exonerating testimony, the judge found him guilty on all three counts:

In June 1971 I returned to Illinois for sentencing. Because I was already employed outside the state and because a host of academic lights from around the country had sent in appeals on my behalf, I was saved from having to do time. Instead, I was given two years probation, a fine, and ordered to pay court costs.

This incident effectively ended Parenti's career as a professor. In December 1971, after his UVM department voted unanimously to renew his teaching contract, the UVM board of trustees and conservative state legislators intervened and voted to let his contract expire, citing Parenti's "unprofessional conduct." The battle over his continued presence on the UVM faculty lasted into early 1972, but ultimately he lost his position there.

In subsequent years, he was unable to obtain another non-temporary teaching job. He learned from sympathetic associates at the colleges he applied to that he was being rejected for his leftist views and political activism. He chronicles this period of his life in the essay, "Struggles in Academe: A Personal Account", published in Dirty Truths. He discusses the broader question of political orthodoxy in U.S. higher education in "The Empire in Academia" chapter of his 1995 book, Against Empire. Because he couldn't earn a steady livelihood as a professor, Parenti began to devote himself full-time to writing, public speaking, and politics.

In 1974, he ran for the U.S. House of Representatives in Vermont as the candidate of the democratic socialist Liberty Union Party; he finished in third place with 7.1% of the vote. During his years in Vermont, Parenti became good friends with Bernie Sanders. However, the two men later split over Sanders' support for the NATO bombing of Yugoslavia.

In the 1980s, Parenti was a visiting fellow at the Institute for Policy Studies in Washington, D.C. In 2003, the Caucus for a New Political Science gave him a Career Achievement Award. In 2007, he received a Certificate of Special Congressional Recognition from U.S. Representative Barbara Lee.

He served for 12 years as a judge for Project Censored. He also was on the advisory boards of Independent Progressive Politics Network and Education Without Borders as well as the advisory editorial boards of New Political Science and Nature, Society and Thought.

In his 2001 book To Kill a Nation: The Attack on Yugoslavia, Parenti decried what he considered the demonization by Western leaders of Slobodan Milošević and his Serbian Socialist Party. In 2003, Parenti became Co-Chairman for the U.S. National Section of the International Committee to Defend Slobodan Milošević (ICDSM). The committee was formed to urge an end to the war crimes trial of Milošević that commenced in 2002 at the International Criminal Tribunal for the former Yugoslavia (ICTY) in The Hague.

== Personal life and death ==
In the last decades of his life, Parenti made his home in Berkeley, California. He was the father of Christian Parenti, an academic, author and journalist.

Parenti died at an assisted living facility in Amherst, Massachusetts, on January 24, 2026, at the age of 92.

== Works ==
The first notable book in Parenti's writing career was Democracy for the Few. Originally published in 1974, it has since gone through nine editions and been used as a textbook in college political science courses. Democracy for the Few contains a critical analysis of the workings of American government with particular focus on the relationship between economic power and political power.

Parenti's Inventing Reality: The Politics of the Mass Media (1986) was reviewed by multiple scholarly journals and by Michael Pollan in The New York Times. Pollan wrote: "By documenting patterns of conservative bias in a dozen major news stories in the printed and broadcast press, Inventing Reality provides a valuable rebuttal to the drumbeat of criticism of the news media from the right. Unfortunately, Mr. Parenti is so simplistic and doctrinaire in accounting for this bias that he makes his book easy to dismiss." The reviewer went on to note how the author "paints the press in such broad, Marxist strokes that he ignores many details. He cannot, for example, adequately account for episodes of courage and independence, as during Vietnam and Watergate." In a response to the review published as a Letter to the Editor, Parenti challenged Pollan's negative assessment.

Parenti continued his exploration of mass media in Make-Believe Media: The Politics of Entertainment (1992). The book dissects numerous popular movies and TV programs which, in Parenti's view, "have propagated images and themes that support militarism, imperialism, racism, sexism, authoritarianism, and other undemocratic values." He describes what he believes is a pattern of unflattering portrayals of working-class people and trade unions, and he disputes the notion that the major studios are "giving audiences what they want." Other leftist writers have been influenced by his media critiques, for instance, Tabe Bergman echoes Parenti's claim that "hegemony-undermining information and views" usually fail to get aired. In Through Jaundiced Eyes: How the Media View Organized Labor, William Puette lists Parenti's seven generalizations for how the media depict labor struggles. In a 2014 article on how the news and entertainment media "sell" counterterrorism, Brigitte Nacos and Yaeli Bloch-Elkon joined with Parenti in rejecting the conservative charge that Hollywood is "a den of leftist shills", and instead argued that "Concentrated corporate ownership and the influence of Pentagon, CIA, NASA, and other government agencies on war movies in particular" were providing political entertainment to generate sympathy for the status quo and America's use of political violence. In his foreword to Matthew Alford's 2010 book Reel Power: Hollywood Cinema and American Supremacy, Parenti reiterated several of the points from Make-Believe Media.

Along with his interest in mass media's role in society, Parenti regularly published articles and books on cultural matters, e.g., "Reflections on the Politics of Culture", in which he agrees with Antonio Gramsci that culture "is largely reflective of existing hegemonic arrangements within the social order, strongly favoring some interests over others." He further develops this idea in his books Land of Idols, Superpatriotism, The Culture Struggle, and God and His Demons.

In a Los Angeles Times review, political commentator Kevin Phillips dismissed Parenti's The Sword and the Dollar: Imperialism, Revolution and the Arms Race (1989) as a Marxist polemic, "albeit flavored with scholarship and sprinkled with footnotes". Phillips faulted Parenti for a biased comparison of U.S. and Soviet imperialisms, and for citing sources that too often included "New York's Monthly Review Press, International Publishers, Progress Publishers of Moscow and the like. One has visions of gray East Bloc bookstores and Upper West Side of Manhattan coffeehouses."

Dirty Truths: Reflections on Politics, Media, Ideology, Conspiracy, Ethnic Life and Class Power (1996) contains Parenti's most wide-ranging collection of writings. Among its essays are "Fascism in a Pinstriped Suit" on the possibility of American fascism arriving subtly and gradually rather than intruding in a nightmarish "Big Brother" fashion; "Now for the Weather" on how even TV weather reports can be politicized; and "False Consciousness" on why the lower classes sometimes adopt the opinions and attitudes of the upper classes. In two essays on the JFK assassination, he breaks ranks with fellow leftists such as Noam Chomsky by giving credence to skeptics of the official government narrative. He also explores what he calls "Conspiracy Phobia on the Left". Dirty Truths concludes with autobiographical sketches and poems.

Parenti's provocative 1997 book Blackshirts and Reds: Rational Fascism and the Overthrow of Communism begins by examining the ideological underpinnings of European fascism in the 1920s and '30s as well as its incarnations as neofascism. He then takes the controversial position of defending the Soviet Union and other communist countries from reflexive condemnation, arguing that they featured a number of advantages over capitalist countries, e.g., by ensuring less economic inequality. He summarizes his approach in the Preface to Blackshirts and Reds:

This book invites those immersed in the prevailing orthodoxy of “democratic capitalism” to entertain iconoclastic views, to question the shibboleths of free-market mythology and the persistence of both right and left anti-communism, and to consider anew, with a receptive but not uncritical mind, the historic efforts of the much maligned Reds and other revolutionaries.

He later argues that the Soviet Union's "well-publicized deficiencies and injustices" were exacerbated by the Russian Civil War, the Nazi-led multinational invasion, and by non-military modes of capitalist intervention against the Eastern Bloc. Moreover, he claims that "pure socialists" and "left anticommunists" had failed to specify a viable alternative to the "siege socialism" implemented in the Soviet model. By offering a rare defense of 20th century Communism, Blackshirts and Reds elicited strong reactions from anarchist and Communist publications. Stephen Zunes, an international studies scholar who had previously worked with Parenti at the Institute for Policy Studies, labeled him as "an apologist for the Soviet system". Writer Alex Skopic of Current Affairs noted that Parenti accused Western scholarship of inflating the death toll under Stalin's leadership. While acknowledging that several estimates were overblown, Skopic responded that "even one life wrongfully taken in the name of socialism would be an appalling tragedy".

=== Yugoslavia and the Bosnian genocide ===
Parenti supported Milošević during the Yugoslav Wars and, according to Trip Gabriel of the New York Times, "scoffed at news reports that Bosnian Serbs had executed nearly 7,500 Bosnian Muslims in 1995 in Srebrenica, in Bosnia and Herzegovina". According to the American anarchist Shon Meckfessel, Parenti also denied mass rapes had been committed by Serbian forces in the Bosnian and Kosovo Wars. The Congress of North American Bosniaks (CNAB), the Yugoslavia historian Marko Attila Hoare, and the Srebrenica Genocide Memorial Center characterized Parenti's views as Bosnian genocide denial.

In Project Censored's 2000 volume, Parenti wrote: "Hyperbolic labeling takes the place of evidence: 'genocide,' 'mass atrocities,' 'systematic rapes,' and even 'rape camps' - camps which no one has ever located." In To Kill a Nation: The Attack on Yugoslavia (2001), Parenti wrote that contrary to Western assertions of an ethnic cleansing policy, Serbia had long been the most ethnically diverse region in Yugoslavia (with 200,000 Muslims living in Belgrade), and that NATO engaged in "hypocritical humanitarianism" as a pretext for military intervention and the privatization of Serbia's public sector economy. He argued that most of the ethnic cleansing that occurred after the breakup of Yugoslavia "was perpetrated not by the Serbs but against them." Gabriel wrote that his support for Milošević was a position "few others on the American left would take". Milošević wrote a preface for the Serbian edition of To Kill a Nation: The Attack on Yugoslavia, where he praised Parenti as "an American to whom every true veracious [sic] inhabitant of the Planet ought to be grateful for the great courage and ability to see and understand the events that marked the last decade of the twentieth century".

Hoare dismissed To Kill a Nation as an "apologia for Milošević and his regime" and accused Parenti of citing "the same or other similar authors in support of the same set of allegations, creating a closed circle of mutually supporting references that substitute for any genuine documentation or historical enquiry." In the Journal of Genocide Research, he described Parenti as promoting "[a] myth that the Western powers destroyed Yugoslavia and persecuted Serbia because they were 'socialist'" while failing to provide sources, neglecting to mention that Milošević had privatized telecommunications in Serbia, and portraying any opposition to Milošević as a Western conspiracy. Genocide scholar Adam Jones characterized Parenti as one of several "left-leaning writers...whose sympathy for Stalinist regimes and simplistic understanding of anti-imperialism also led them to defend the likes of Slobodan Milošević." He accused Parenti of instinctually defending any regime that the United States opposed, regardless of context.

In 2012, the San Jose Peace and Justice Center invited Parenti as a guest speaker; this drew protests from the CNAB and human rights groups, prompting Parenti's withdrawal.

== Appearances in media ==
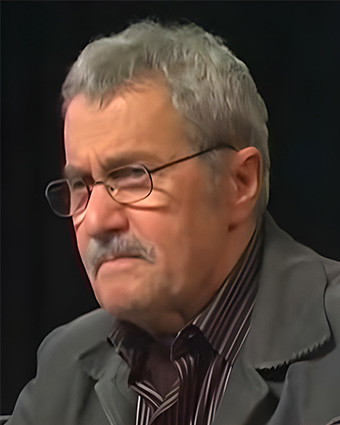
Parenti speaks about "Democracy and the Pathology of Wealth" at the La Peña Cultural Center in Berkeley, California, in January 2012.

Apart from video recordings of his public speaking engagements, Parenti also appeared in the 1992 documentary The Panama Deception, and in the 2004 Liberty Bound and 2013 Fall and Winter documentaries as an author and social commentator.

In July 2003, he was invited on the C-SPAN Booknotes program to discuss his latest work, The Assassination of Julius Caesar: A People's History of Ancient Rome. He appeared in an episode of the Showtime series Penn & Teller: Bullshit!, speaking briefly about the Dalai Lama (Episode 305 – Holier Than Thou).

Because of his research for the book To Kill a Nation: The Attack on Yugoslavia (2001) and his travel in the war-torn region shortly after the NATO bombing, Parenti was interviewed in Boris Malagurski's documentary film The Weight of Chains (2010) and its sequel The Weight of Chains 2 (2014) about the former Yugoslavia.

New York City-based punk rock band Choking Victim uses a number of samples from Parenti's lectures in its album No Gods, No Managers. Chilean hip-hop artist Ana Tijoux features a section of one of Parenti's lectures in her song "Caluga o menta".

== Bibliography ==
- The Anti-Communist Impulse (1969) LCCN 72-85615
- Trends and Tragedies in American Foreign Policy (1971) LCCN 74-161844
- Democracy for the Few (1st edition 1974, 9th edition 2010) ISBN 978-0495911265
- Ethnic and Political Attitudes: A Depth Study of Italian Americans (1975) ISBN 978-0405064135
- Power and the Powerless (1978) ISBN 978-0312633738
- Inventing Reality: The Politics of the Mass Media (1st edition, 1986) ISBN 978-0312434731
- The Sword and the Dollar: Imperialism, Revolution, and the Arms Race (1989) ISBN 978-0312011673
- Inventing Reality: The Politics of News Media (2nd edition, 1992) ISBN 978-0312020132
- Make-Believe Media: The Politics of Entertainment (1992) ISBN 978-0312058944
- Land of Idols: Political Mythology in America (1993) ISBN 978-0312098414
- Against Empire (1995) ISBN 978-0872862982
- Dirty Truths (1996) ISBN 978-0872863170
- Blackshirts and Reds: Rational Fascism and the Overthrow of Communism (1997) ISBN 978-0872863293
- America Besieged (1998) ISBN 978-0872863385
- History as Mystery (1999) ISBN 978-0872863576
- To Kill a Nation: The Attack on Yugoslavia (2001) ISBN 1859847765
- The Terrorism Trap: September 11 and Beyond (2002) ISBN 978-0872864054
- The Assassination of Julius Caesar: A People's History of Ancient Rome (2003) ISBN 978-1565849426
- Superpatriotism (2004) ISBN 978-0872864337
- The Culture Struggle (2006) ISBN 978-1471610721
- Contrary Notions: The Michael Parenti Reader (2007) ISBN 978-0872864825
- God and His Demons (2010) ISBN 978-1616141776
- The Face of Imperialism (2011) ISBN 978-1594519178
- Waiting for Yesterday: Pages from a Street Kid's Life (2013) ISBN 978-1599540580
- Profit Pathology and Other Indecencies (2015) ISBN 978-1612056616
- Quotations From Michael Parenti (2024)

== See also ==
- 2000 Yugoslavian general election
- Anti anti-communism
- Communist state
- False consciousness
