= Damir Nikšić =

Bosnian artist and politician (born 1970)

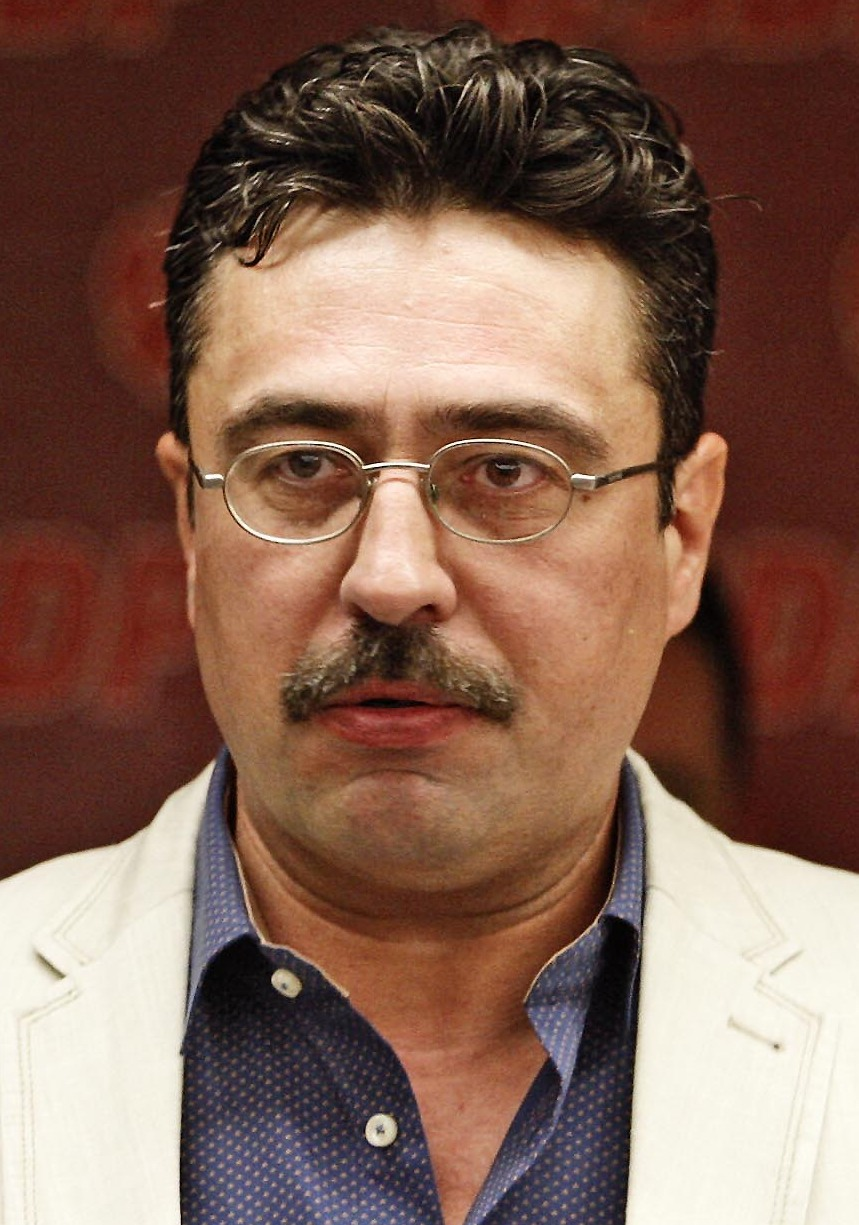
- Nikšić in 2018

Member of the Federal House of Representatives
- Incumbent
- Assumed office 1 December 2022

Personal details
- Born: 6 December 1970 (age 55) Brčko, SR Bosnia and Herzegovina, SFR Yugoslavia
- Party: Independent
- Other political affiliations: Social Democratic Party (2018–2019); Our Party (2022–2025)
- Spouse: Valida Repovac
- Education: Academy of Fine Arts Sarajevo; University of Arizona
- Known for: Conceptual art

Damir Nikšić (born 6 December 1970) is a Bosnian conceptual artist, standup comedian, blogger and politician. He has served as member of the Federal House of Representatives since 2022.

An independent, Nikšić was a member of Our Party. Previously, he was a member of the Social Democratic Party. One of Nikšić's best known art works is a seven-minute-long video entitled "If I wasn't muslim" (2005).

== Biography ==
=== General ===
Nikšić was born 6 December 1970 in Brezovo Polje, Brčko. He was a student at fine arts academies in Sarajevo, Milan and Bologna. In 2000 he graduated at Academy of Fine Arts Sarajevo, Painting department. He has lived in the USA 2000–2004; he has studied as a postgraduate at the University of Arizona (UA) until 2004. He magistered fine arts and art history in 2004 at UA; after that, he gave lectures at Northwestern University in Evanston, Illinois. He was a member of Maxumim art group. He exhibited at Venice Film Festival in 2003 international selection. He works and lives in Sarajevo.

=== Education ===
In 2000 he acquired a BFA degree from Academy of Fine Arts Sarajevo and moved as a graduate student to Indiana, Pennsylvania, USA. In 2001 he moved to Tucson, Arizona, where he graduated at the University of Arizona in May 2004. In 2004 he moved to Chicago, Illinois.

=== Sing Sing ===
Nikšić was a co-founder and member (vocal singer) of rhythm and blues band "Sing Sing". The band played four concerts in CDA Mladost.

=== Maxumim ===
Damir Nikšić is also a co-founder of Maxumim art group, together with Anur Hadžiomerspahić, Anela Šabić, Ajna Zlatar, Eldina Begić, Dejan Vekić, Almir Kurt, Samir Plasto, Hamdija Pašić, Rachel Rossner, Nebojša Šerić, Suzana Cerić, Alma Fazlić, Zlatan Filipović. In 1997, the group has its first exhibition "Maxumim I," at Collegium Artisticum, Sarajevo, which would be followed up in 1998 with "Maxumim II," and in 1999/2000 with "Maxumim III," at Collegium Artisticum, Sarajevo; Pavarotti Music Center, Mostar; Bosnian Cultural Center, Tuzla; City Gallery, Zenica; City Gallery, Bihać.

=== Other activities ===
In 2011, he protested regarding the closing of the Art Gallery of Bosnia and Herzegovina, setting up daily video updates.

=== Work method – criticism ===
He mostly presents his art through YouTube and social networks, where he uploads short videos and comments of humorous character in which he seriously and symbolically refers to the reality of Bosnia and Herzegovina. He also commented on the attack on Serbian Prime Minister Aleksandar Vučić during his visit to the event marking the 20th anniversary of the Srebrenica crime, saying in his video Srebrni pir: Manipulacija razjedinjenih nacija ("Silver Feast: A Disunited Nations Manipulation") published on 13 July 2015 that "a corrida was made of Potočari"; this has received a notable media attention in his home and neighbouring countries.

=== Political engagement ===
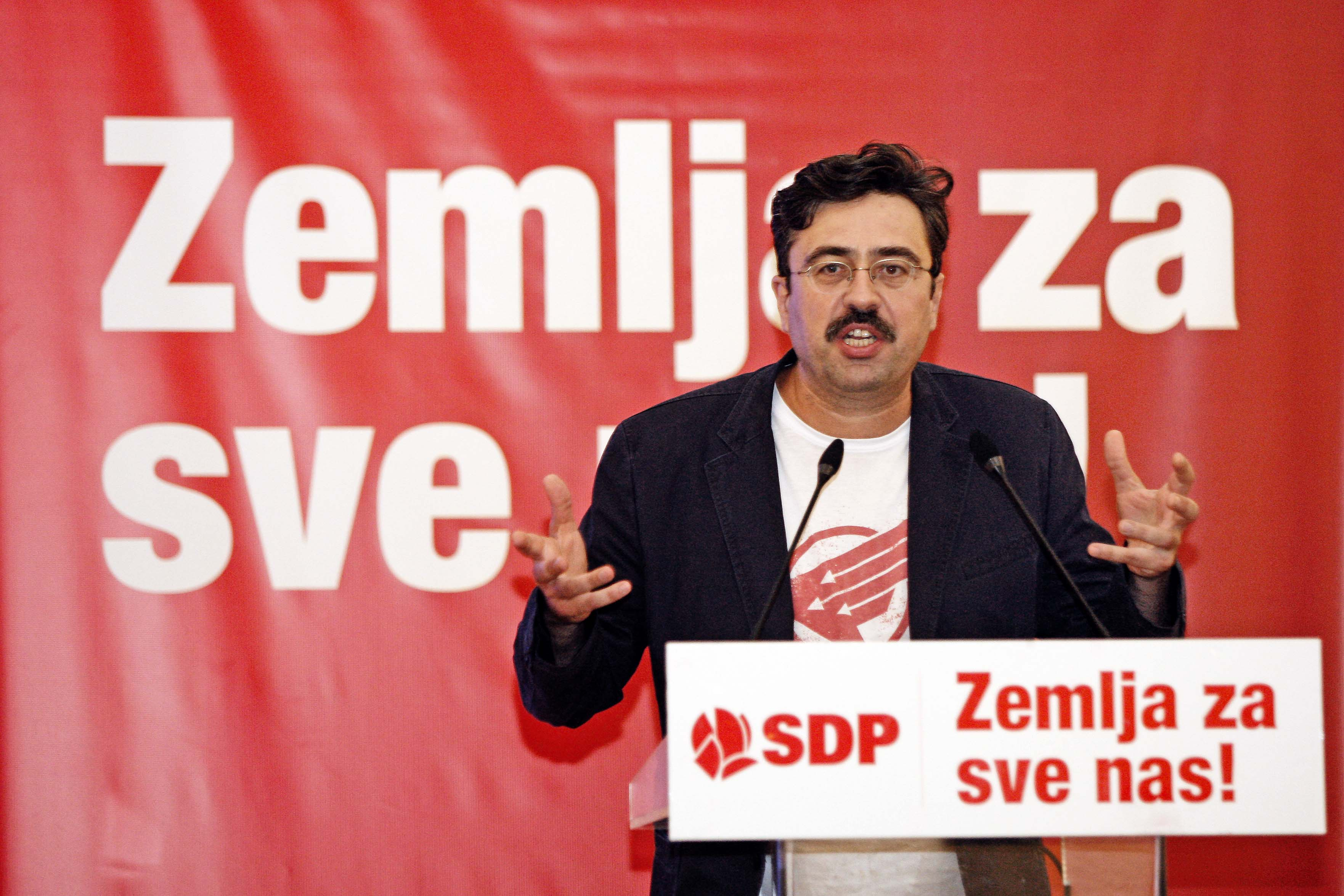
Nikšić speaking at a Social Democratic Party rally, 9 September 2018

In mid-2016, Nikšić decided to run for municipal mayor of the Sarajevo Centar Municipality, as a "libertarian, individualist and anarchist." In an interview with the Bosnian portal Klix.ba, he said the following:

I am someone who is an individualist, someone who really believes in individualism, not collectivism. I became disappointed with the collective and became a great cynic and individualist. (...) The state is giving more money to that kind of smeared folklore tradition where some imaginary people are celebrated, somewhere out there... some tribe in the forest or on the mountain or in a small village, but no one is really that people, so that's a good place to hunt in the murky and money laundering. For this reason, an individual is important, he can engage in dialogue, while the people cannot, because they cannot speak unison. (...) We have very big fascist problems on our own soil and I have no intention of hiding, as some 'Bosniak', what 'my' [people is] are doing to me and insisting on what 'another' [one] is doing to us. No, it's all individual, and I want to set some parameters for you by my own example, on how to combat it both through art and through politics.

His goal, he said, was to make a more European city of Sarajevo and prevent the feudalisation of Bosnia and Herzegovina, and that his office would always be covered by a camera whose footage would be broadcast online so that citizens could watch the "one municipality mayor's reality show" live. He was not elected in the 2016 municipal elections, but later became a member of the Sarajevo Canton Assembly. From 23 May 2018, until his expulsion on 16 March 2019, Nikšić was a member of the Social Democratic Party.

Nikšić joined the social-liberal Our Party in June 2022. In the 2022 general election, he was elected to the Federal House of Representatives, obtaining over 3,000 votes.

=== Philosophy ===
Nikšić's political philosophy aims for others to understand that one is living in a crisis of civil society and thus the civil state, that is—ethnocracy is present instead of democracy. Instead of the idea of people and collectivism, he advocates individualism and the notion of citizens as individuals, calling the ideology he follows "liberal progressive individualist discourse" and "stratoseparatism."

== Most notable works ==
- If I wasn't muslim (2005)
- Krunisanje Kralja Tvrtka (2007)
- Totalitarni fatalizam (2015)

=== Songs ===
- "Ta to ti" (2012)
- "Gdje si" (2012)
- "Sjedio sam u kafani sam" (2013)
- "Na rubu plača" (2015)
- "Stranac u svome plemenu" (2016) - izvedba pjesme grupe Major (autor: Masa Mor)
- "Još jedna revolucionarna" (2018)
- "Hastahana" [demo] (2020)
