= Belgrade Documentary and Short Film Festival =

- Location: Belgrade, Serbia
- Language: International
- Website: https://martovski.rs/

Belgrade Documentary and Short Film Festival or Martovski is an international documentary and short film festival held in Belgrade, Serbia. It is the oldest film festival in Serbia and the region, as well as one of the oldest European and world film festivals.

== History ==
The Belgrade Documentary and Short Film Festival started out in 1960 as the Belgrade edition of the Festival of Yugoslav Film in Pula, Yugoslavia, while its current name was introduced in 2004. During Yugoslav times, the festival played a significant role in reflecting and shaping the country's shifting ideological narratives. As of 2017, the City of Belgrade, as the founder of the Belgrade Youth Center, handed over the Festival management, documentation, finances and technical jobs to this cultural institution.

Many directors awarded at this Festival for their documentaries and short films went on to have successful careers in Yugoslav and Serbian cinema: Zlatko Bourek, Ante Babaja, Krsto Papić, Stole Popov, Bahrudin Čengić, Puriša Đorđević, Dušan Makavejev, Predrag Golubović. Dušan Vukotić won the Grand Prix at the Belgrade Documentary and Short Film Festival for his short animated film Surogat. This is the only Yugoslav film that has won the Academy Award for Best Animated Short Film.

Ahead of its 70th anniversary in 2023, the Belgrade Documentary and Short Film Festival was awarded the Sretenje Order of the Third Degree on Serbia’s Statehood Day. The recognition was granted by decree of the President of Serbia Aleksandar Vučić. The award acknowledges the role of filmmakers, organizers, audiences, guests, and others who have contributed to the development of the festival.
