= Slavko Kulić =

Croatian scientist and economist

Slavko Kulić (born 21 August 1941) is a Croatian scientist and economist concerned with the sociology of international relations.

Kulić was born in Razvođe, Promina. He graduated from the Faculty of Business and Economics at the University of Zagreb, and made postgraduate studies in philosophy, politics, economics, law and sociology in Zagreb, Belgrade and Ljubljana. He made study visits to the U.S., the former U.S.S.R., China and Europe on the sociology of international relations, especially irenology (peace studies) and polemology (war studies) in the context of international relations.

He was made senior research fellow at the Institute of Economics in Zagreb, Croatia in 1970, and later became head respectively of the Institute's Department for International Relations, Department for Strategic Research, and Department of Supradisciplinary Research for existence and development of life on the planet Earth.

He has been President of the Scientific Society of the Economists of Croatia since 2004.

Kulić advocates what he calls a "globalisation of humanism and morals, as opposed to a globalisation of violence and profit in the world" about which he has written and spoken in Croatia.

He has participated in more than 150 international scientific conferences and symposia on the sociology of international relations, including political, economical, legal, social and military discussions.

== Selected scientific works and books ==
- Globalizacija, kvartalni kapitalizam i njegove refleksije na hrvatsko društvo - problem transparentnosti kapital odnosa u hrvatskom gospodarstvu i društvu - Globalisation, quartal capitalism and its reflection to croatian society, Zagreb, 2006.
- Neoliberalizam kao socijaldarvinizam - Neoliberalism as socialdarwinism, Prometej, Zagreb, 2004.
- Kvartalni kapitalizam i njegovi dometi na tlu Hrvatske: Globalizacija u Hrvatskoj i Hrvatska u globalizaciji - Quartal capitalism and its achievements in Croatia: Globalisation in Croatia and Croatia in Globalisation, Knjižnica “Kritika”, Zagreb, 2003.
- Globalizacija i trajektorij RH u svijetu interesa i država – društveni obzor hrvatskoga gospodarstva, Zagreb, 2002.
- Lažna zora globalizacije, Ekonomski institut Zagreb, 2000.
- Što je to samosvijest suvremenog svijeta? Tolerancija nasilja i zlouporaba moći u vrijeme mira - What is consciousness of the modern world? Tolerance of violence and abuse of power in times of peace, Collected lectures, Ekonomski institut Zagreb (EIZ), Zagreb, 1999.
- Dijalog o nacizmu i globalizaciji, Zagreb – Salzburg – Paris, izdanje “Adamić”, Rijeka, 1998.
- Nužnost rekonstitucije hrvatskog društva i države, Ekonomski institut Zagreb (EIZ), Zagreb, 1998.
- Strategija nasilja kao strategija razvoja - Strategy of violence as development strategy, “Naprijed”, Zagreb, 1996.
- Kritičko teorijski osvrt na ekonomsku i političku strukturu nove Europe, IDP, Revijalno izdanje, Zagreb, 1992.
- Znanstveno tehnološka revolucija za koga? - Scientific and technological revolution: for whom?, Jugoart, Zagreb – Beograd, 1990.
