= Darko Matijašević =

Darko Matijašević (born 10 July 1968) is a politician from Republika Srpska, Bosnia and Herzegovina. He is of Serb ethnicity.

== Early life and education ==
Matijasevic was born in Kostajnica, Yugoslavia, and graduated from the Military Technical Academy in Zagreb in 1991. He completed his post-graduate studies at the University of Belgrade Faculty of Organisational Sciences, and is working on a doctorate in strategic management in complex organisations. He also has a master's degree in modern transatlantic relations from the University of Paris.

== Career ==
After serving in the Yugoslav People's Army and the Army of Republika Srpska, in 1998 Matijasevic was appointed Chief of Cabinet of the Minister of Defence in the Government of the Republika Srpska, and in 2001 he was appointed Military Diplomatic Representative of Bosnia and Herzegovina with the Bosnia and Herzegovina Standing Mission to the European Union and NATO in Brussels. He was the Minister of Interior in the previous Government of Republika Srpska.

== Personal life ==
He is married with two children.
