= Michel Chossudovsky =

Canadian economist and author

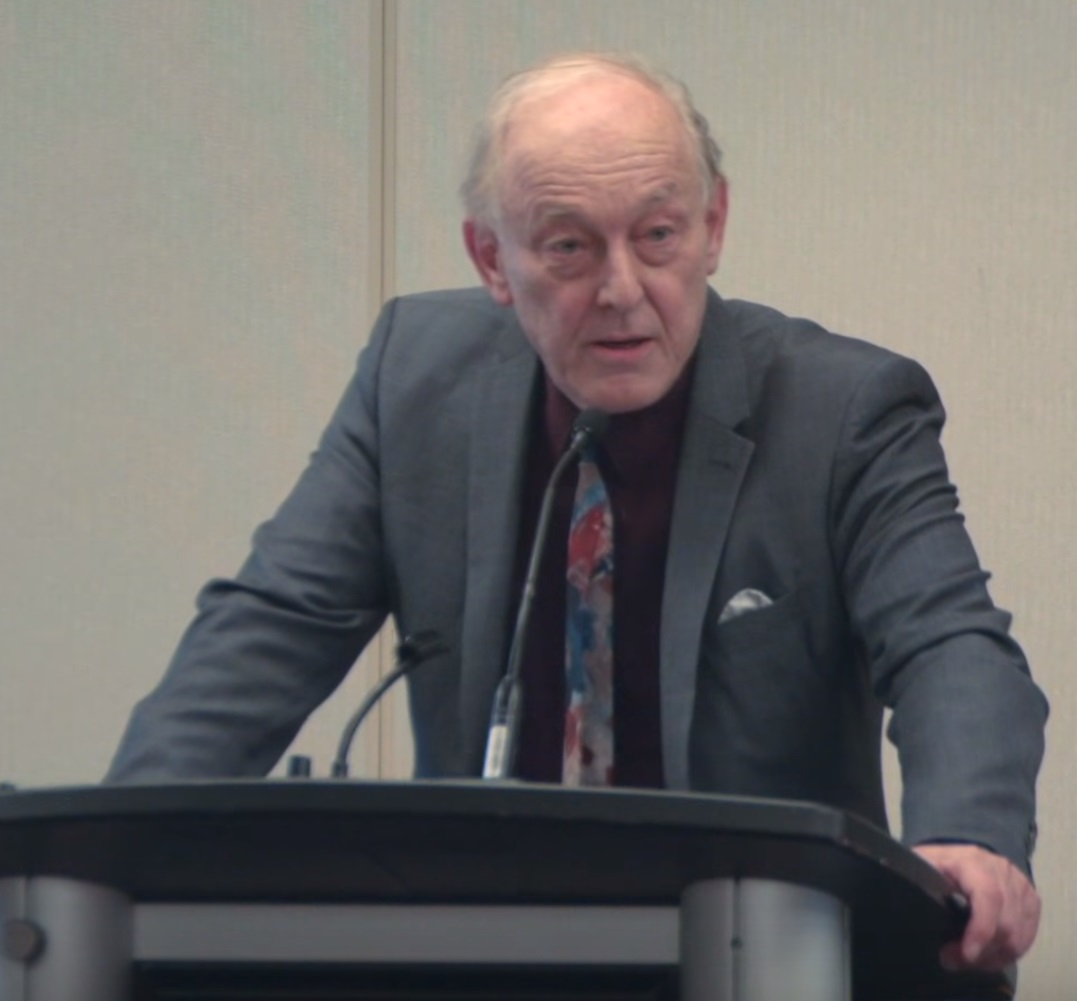
- Chossudovsky speaks in Montreal in 2017
- Born: September 8 1946 (age 79–80)

Academic work
- Discipline: Economic development Globalization; International financial institutions World economy
- Institutions: Professor Emeritus, University of Ottawa; Centre for Research on Globalization

Michel Chossudovsky (born September 8 1946) is a Canadian economist and author. He is professor emeritus of economics at the University of Ottawa and the president and director of the Centre for Research on Globalization (CRG), which runs the website globalresearch.ca, founded in 2001, which publishes falsehoods and conspiracy theories. Chossudovsky has promoted conspiracy theories about 9/11.

In 2017, the Centre for Research on Globalization was accused by information warfare specialists at NATO’s Strategic Communications Centre of Excellence (STRATCOM) of playing a key role in the spread of pro-Russian propaganda. A report by the U.S. State Department in August 2020 accused the website of being a proxy for a Russian disinformation campaign.

== Biography ==
Chossudovsky is the son of a Russian Jewish émigré, the career United Nations diplomat and academic Evgeny Chossudovsky, and an Irish Protestant, Rachel Sullivan. Raised in Switzerland, Chossudovsky moved to Canada and joined the University of Ottawa in 1968. According to the Ottawa Citizen, Chossudovsky's academic research kept him "on the margins of mainstream academia," but won praise from anti-establishment intellectuals such as Noam Chomsky. In 2005, shortly after Chossudovsky began writing about terrorism, the Citizen reported that Chossudovsky's was "a popular figure among anti-globalization activists," and that some of his students referred to him as "Canada's Chomsky." At that time, some colleagues were becoming uncomfortable with Chossudovsky's ideas, with one professor describing them as having "a conspiratorial element."

In 2005, Chossudovsky published the book America's "War on Terrorism". According to The New York Times, the "conspiracy-minded book... argued that the Sept. 11, 2001, attacks were simply a pretext for American incursions into the Middle East, and that Bin Laden was nothing but a boogeyman created by the United States". The book was found on a bookshelf in Osama bin Laden's Abbottabad, Pakistan compound. According to the Vox website, the book's theory is that "9/11 was a United States government conspiracy to start the Iraq War and enable a 'new world order' to help corporate interests. Bin Laden was, at best, a pawn in CIA interests."

Chossudovsky has contributed to the French magazine Le Monde diplomatique. He is frequently quoted by or appears on the Kremlin-backed RT (formerly known as Russia Today) or in material issued by the Sputnik news agency. The Centre for Research on Globalization regularly reposts content from both outlets.

=== Centre for Research on Globalization ===
In September 9, 2001, Chossudovsky founded the Centre for Research on Globalization (CRG), becoming its director and the editor of its online resource, Global Research at the website Globalresearch.ca. Located in Montreal, Quebec, Canada, the CRG describes itself as an "independent research and media organization" providing "analysis on issues which are barely covered by the mainstream media". Chossudovsky notes that he founded the website the day after his birthday as well as also two days before the 9/11 attacks, an event that Chossudovsky and other authors on the website published conspiracy theories about.

The Centre for Research on Globalization promotes conspiracy theories and falsehoods. According to Peter Knight, it "published influential early articles alleging that the U.S. intelligence agencies had far more forewarning than they claimed" of the September 11 attacks, that the United States and its allies fund al-Qaeda and the Islamic State, and that sarin was not used in the Khan Shaykhun chemical attack, which globalresearch.ca articles characterized as a false flag operation orchestrated by terrorists opposed to the former Syrian President Bashar al-Assad. Other articles published on the site have asserted that the 7 July 2005 London bombings were perpetrated by the United States, Israel, and United Kingdom. Chossudovsky has himself posted articles on the site which suggested that Osama bin Laden was a CIA asset, and accusing the United States, Israel and Britain of plotting to conquer the world. The centre has also promoted the Irish slavery myth, prompting a letter by more than 80 scholars debunking the myth.

According to PolitiFact, the Centre "has advanced specious conspiracy theories on topics like 9/11, vaccines and global warming." Foreign Policy magazine has commented that the Centre "sells books and videos that 'expose' how the September 11 terrorist attacks were 'most likely a special covert action' to 'further the goals of corporate globalization.'" A 2010 study categorized the website as a source of anti-vaccine misinformation. The Atlantic Council's Digital Forensic Research Lab described it as "pro-Putin and anti-NATO". The Jewish Tribune, citing a complaint from B'nai Brith Canada, describing the website as being "rife with anti-Jewish conspiracy theory and Holocaust denial." Writing for The New Republic in 2013, Muhammad Idrees Ahmad, lecturer in digital journalism at the University of Stirling, describes the centre's website as a "conspiracy site".

In November 2017, The Globe and Mail reported that the centre's website was "in the sights" of NATO information warfare specialists investigating "the online spread of pro-Russia propaganda and of disinformation." According to the Globe, NATO's Strategic Communications Centre of Excellence (StratCom) believed that the site was playing a "key accelerant role in helping popularize articles with little basis in fact that also happen to fit the narratives being pushed by the Kremlin" and the Assad regime. The report described the site as an "online refuge for conspiracy theorists" and suggested that NATO specialists viewed it as "a link in a concerted effort to undermine the credibility of mainstream Western media—as well as the North American and European public's trust in government and public institutions." Asked to comment on the report, Chossudovsky responded through his lawyer, saying that the Centre did not have ties to pro-Russia or pro-Assad networks, was not "affiliated with governmental organizations" and did not benefit from their support.

An August 2020 report by the U.S. State Department Global Engagement Center stated that Global Research is, by a significant margin, the most accessed proxy website allied with the pro-Kremlin disinformation campaign. By the estimation of report's authors, it has accumulated 12.4 million page views, with around 351,247 readers for each article. Chossudovsky is a board member of other pro-Russian websites which attempt to spread conspiracy theories. Responding via his lawyer, this time to CBC News, Chossudovsky again denied the 2020 accusations made against him.

The CRG has been accused of spreading Chinese state propaganda. An article on Global Research making the false assertion that the COVID-19 pandemic was not real was carried by 70 other outlets, according to the August 2020 U.S. State Department report. Chossudovsky himself has described it as being a "manufactured pandemic". Earlier in 2020, his list of 10 questions was tweeted by the foreign minister of Iran. They included the claim that the United States government was responsible for the international coronavirus pandemic. Global Research published an article entitled "COVID-19: Further Evidence that the Virus Originated in the US" was posted on social media by a senior official in the Chinese foreign ministry. Chinese state media have reported such unfounded speculation which has been carried by Chossudovsky's website with, according to The Globe and Mail, misattributed sources. Reportedly, the two articles on this theme have since been removed from the globalresearch.ca website.

In an article Chossudovsky wrote on the Centre's website to celebrate its 25th anniversary on 9 September 2026, Chossudovsky claimed that by that time, the website had about 10,000 authors who contributed to it about 170,000 articles.

== Works ==
- War and Globalisation: The Truth Behind September 11, Global Research, 2003, ISBN 9780973110906
- The Globalization of Poverty and The New World Order, Global Research, 2003, ISBN 9780973714708
- America's "War on Terrorism", Global Research, 2005, OCLC 785862235
- Towards a World War III Scenario: The Dangers of Nuclear War, Global Research, 2011, OCLC 940588105

== Awards ==
- Gold Medal for Merit of the Republic of Serbia, 2014.
