= James Byron Bissett =

Canadian former diplomat

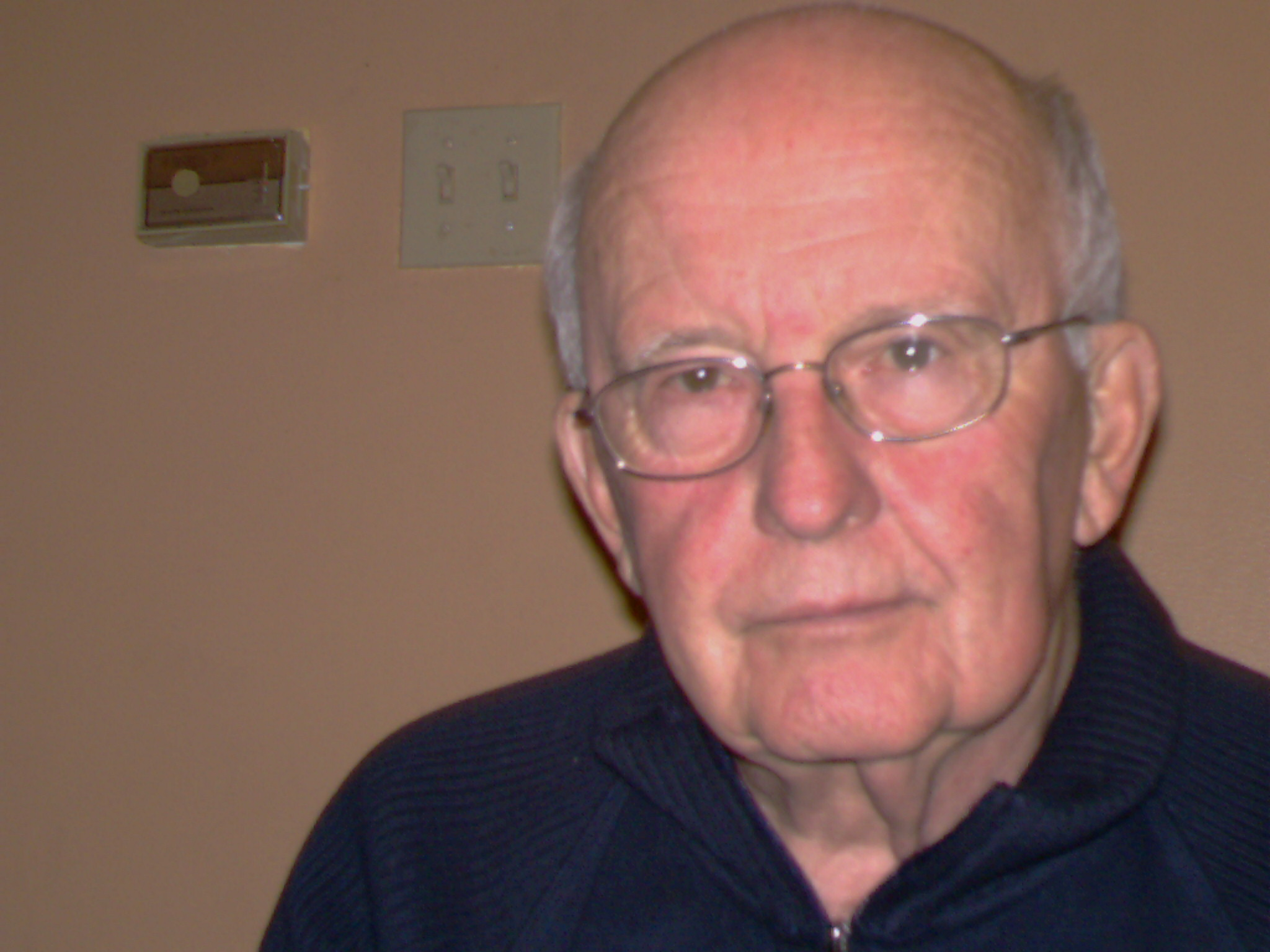
James Bissett in November 2007

James Byron Bissett is a Canadian former diplomat. He was High Commissioner to Trinidad and Tobago and later Ambassador Extraordinary and Plenipotentiary to Yugoslavia, Albania, and Bulgaria.

== Career ==
James Bissett began his post-secondary studies at the University of Winnipeg. In 1956, received a M.A. in Public Administration from Carleton University and thereafter joined the Canadian government. He spent the next 36 years as a public servant in the Department of Citizenship and Immigration and Foreign Affairs.

In 1974 he was appointed head of the Immigration Foreign services. During the early 1970s he served at the Canadian High Commission in London, England. In 1980 he became the assistant undersecretary of state for social affairs in the Department of External Affairs. Two years later he was appointed the Canadian High Commissioner to Trinidad and Tobago, where he remained until 1985. He was then seconded to the Department of Employment and Immigration as executive director.

In 1990 he was appointed Canadian Ambassador to Yugoslavia, Bulgaria and Albania. In the summer of 1992 he retired from foreign service, to accept a job as the head of the International Organization for Migration in Moscow, helping the Russian government establish a new immigration agency and implementing settlement programs for Russians returning to Russia from other parts of the former Soviet Union. He returned to Canada in 1997.

== After the break-up of Yugoslavia ==
Bissett has been a consistent defender of Serb leader Slobodan Milošević and critic of Western policies in the former Yugoslavia. He testified at the Trial of Slobodan Milošević as a defence witness. In 2004, Bissett claimed that "Canada [has] participated in a series of NATO-sanctioned war crimes against Yugoslavia". Regarding the 2004 unrest in Kosovo, he stated that "anti-Serb violence had taken place while an army of 18,000 NATO troops stood by and did nothing to protect the Serbs or their property."

Diplomatic posts
Preceded by Paul-Eugène Laberge	High Commissioner to Trinidad and Tobago; 1982-1985	Succeeded by James Calbert Best
Preceded by Terence Charles Bacon	Ambassador Extraordinary and Plenipotentiary to Yugoslavia, Bulgaria and Albania; 1990-1992	Succeeded by Dennis Snider
