= Ann Furedi =

British abortion-rights activist

- Born: Ann Marie Bradley; 31 October 1960 (age 66); Wolverhampton, Staffordshire, England
- Other name: Ann Burton
- Education: University of Sussex, University of Kent
- Occupations: journalist and abortion rights activist
- Known for: Chief executive of the British Pregnancy Advisory Service
- Spouse: Frank Furedi (m. 1982)

Ann Marie Furedi (née Bradley; born 31 October 1960) is an English former journalist and abortion rights activist. She is the former chief executive of the British Pregnancy Advisory Service (BPAS), the UK's largest independent abortion provider.

== Biography ==
Furedi studied a master's degree in philosophy at the University of Sussex. The University of Kent made her an honorary Doctor of Science in November 2019.

Furedi worked as a journalist, specialising in healthcare features for women's magazines, including Cosmopolitan and Company, sometimes writing under her maiden name, Bradley. She is also known as Ann Burton. In the early 1980s, she worked for the National Council for Civil Liberties as its Gay Rights Officer.

Furedi was a contributor to the LM Magazine until it folded in 2000 after being found to have libelled ITN journalists. She has also contributed to Spiked Online, a British online magazine, that identifies itself as libertarian humanist. For that magazine, she has written in support of sex-selective abortion and about "what Republicans get wrong about abortion." She has served as a board member of the American research charity IBIS Reproductive Health.

Furedi has worked in pro-choice organisations for more than 20 years, mainly in policy and communications. Before joining BPAS, as its chief executive in June 2003, Furedi was Director of Policy and Communications for the UK regulator of infertility treatment and embryo research, the Human Fertilisation and Embryology Authority (HFEA).

Furedi ran the press office of the UK Family Planning Association before leading Birth Control Trust, a charity that advocated the need for research and development in methods of contraception and abortion. She is regarded as a leading pro-choice advocate and spokesperson, often appearing in the media representing this perspective.

In 2012, Furedi's organisation BPAS and the advocacy group Catholics for Choice convened a meeting of abortion providers, advocates and academics, leading to the Declaration of Prochoice Principles being issued.

In 2014, when NHS Greater Glasgow and Clyde appealed to the Supreme Court after judges in Scotland said Roman Catholic midwives had a right to conscientious objection to take any part in abortion procedures, Furedi said that BPAS supported "the right of healthcare professionals to conscientious objection not least because women deserve better than being treated with contempt by those who think they are sinners. But ultimately a balance needs to be struck between that exercise of conscience and women's access to legal services."

Furedi's book The Moral Case for Abortion: A Defence of Reproductive Choice outlines ethical arguments in support of abortion rights. She has also spoken at events including the Battle of Ideas and is a judge at Debating Matters events.

Furedi is also the vice-chairman of the Governing Body at MidKent College, where she chaired the Audit Committee. She retired from paid work in 2020.

== Personal life ==
In 1982, she married Frank Furedi, the founder and then leader of the British Revolutionary Communist Party (RCP). Their son Jacob edits online publication Dispatch.
