= Kenan Malik =

British writer

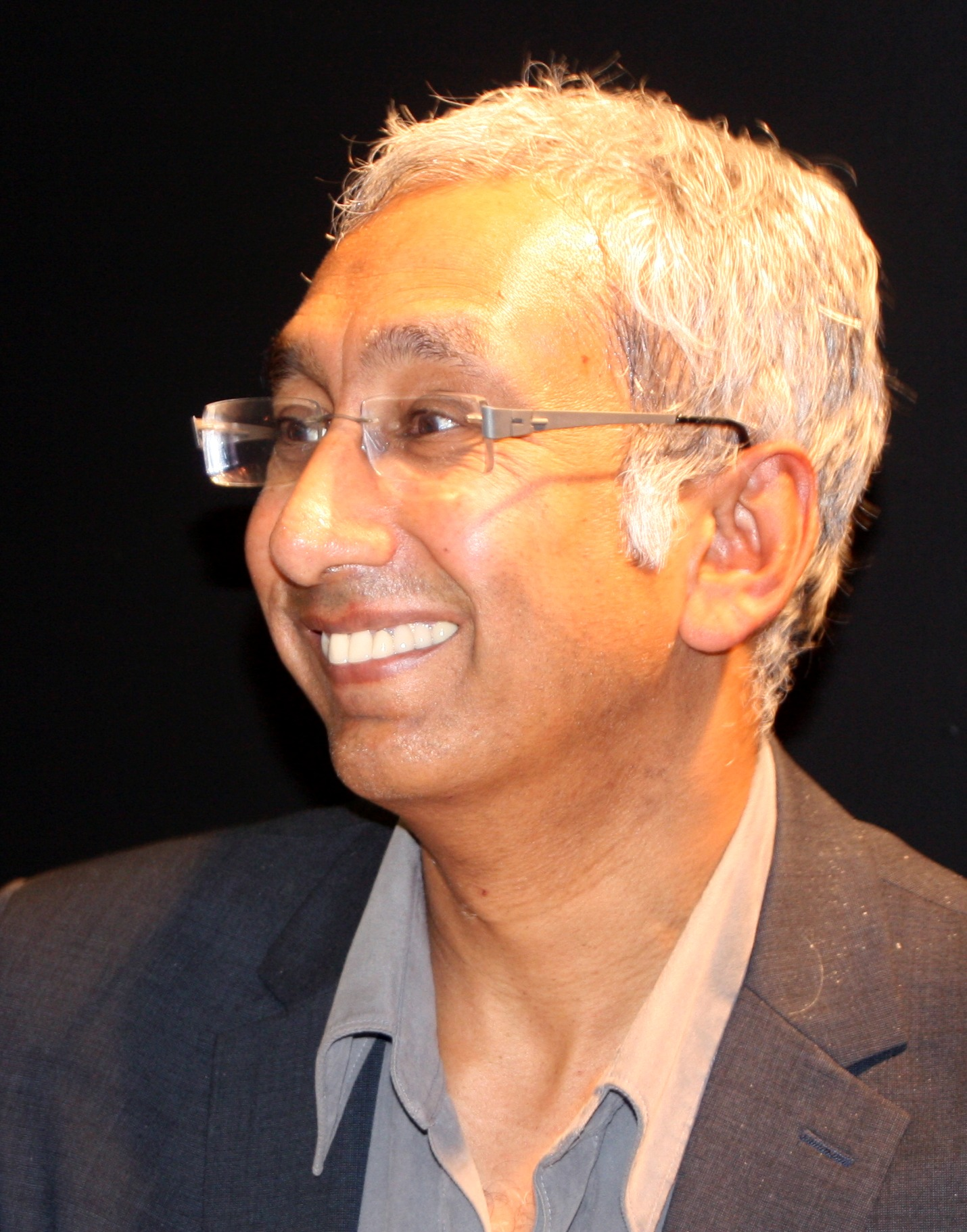
- Malik in 2010
- Born: 26 January 1960 (age 66); Telangana, India
- Education: University of Sussex; Imperial College London
- Occupations: Author, radio presenter
- Writing career
- Genre: Non-fiction
- Subjects: Religion, race, multiculturalism
- Notable works: Man, Beast and Zombie; Strange Fruit; From Fatwa to Jihad; Multiculturalism and Its Discontents; The Quest for a Moral Compass
- Website: kenanmalik.com

Kenan Malik (born 26 January 1960) is a British writer, lecturer and broadcaster, trained in neurobiology and the history of science. As an academic author, his focus is on the philosophy of biology, and contemporary theories of multiculturalism, pluralism, and race. These topics are core concerns in The Meaning of Race (1996), Man, Beast and Zombie (2000) and Strange Fruit: Why Both Sides Are Wrong in the Race Debate (2008).

Malik defends the values of the 18th-century Enlightenment, which he sees as having been distorted and misunderstood in more recent political and scientific thought. He was shortlisted for the Orwell Prize in 2010.

== Career ==
Malik was born in Secunderabad, Telangana, India and brought up in Manchester, England. He studied neurobiology at the University of Sussex and History of Science at Imperial College, London. In between, he was a research psychologist at the Centre for Research into Perception and Cognition (CRPC) at the University of Sussex.

He has given lectures or seminars at a number of universities, including University of Cambridge (Department of Biological Anthropology); University of Oxford (St. Antony's College, Blavatnik School of Government and the Department for Continuing Education); the Institute of Historical Research, London; Goldsmiths College, University of London (Department of Social Anthropology); University of Liverpool (Department of Politics); Nottingham Trent University; University of Newcastle (Department of Social Policy and Sociology); University of Oslo; and the European University Institute, Florence. In 2003, he was a visiting fellow at the University of Melbourne. He is currently Senior Visiting Fellow at the University of Surrey.

As well as being a presenter of Analysis on BBC Radio 4, he has also presented Night Waves, Radio 3's Arts and Ideas magazine. Malik has written and presented a number of TV documentaries, including Disunited Kingdom (2003), Are Muslims Hated? (which was shortlisted for the Index on Censorship Freedom of Expression award, in 2005), Let 'Em All In (2005) and Britain's Tribal Tensions (2006). Strange Fruit was longlisted for the Royal Society Science Book Prize in 2009.

He has written for many newspapers and magazines, including The Guardian, Financial Times, The Independent, Independent on Sunday, Sunday Times, Sunday Telegraph, New Statesman, The New York Times, Prospect, TLS, The Times Higher Education Supplement, Nature, Rising East, Göteborgs-Posten, Bergens Tidende and Handelsblatt. He is a Fellow of the Royal Society of Arts.

Malik's main areas of academic interest are philosophy of biology and philosophy of mind, scientific method and epistemology, theories of human nature, science policy, bioethics, political philosophy, the history, philosophy and sociology of race, and the history of ideas.

Malik is a Distinguished Supporter of Humanists UK and a trustee of the free-speech magazine Index on Censorship.

== Politics ==
Interview with Kenan Malik from 17 November 2016 in which he speaks about diversity and identity

Malik has long campaigned for equal rights, freedom of expression, and a secular society, and in defence of rationalism and humanism in the face of what he has called "a growing culture of irrationalism, mysticism and misanthropy".

In the 1980s, he was associated with a number of Marxist organisations, including the Socialist Workers Party (SWP) and the Revolutionary Communist Party (RCP), and Big Flame.

He was the Red Front candidate in Nottingham East in the 1987 general election. He stood as the RCP's candidate in Birmingham Selly Oak in the general election in 1992, coming last out of six candidates with 84 votes (0.15%). He was also involved with anti-racist campaigns, including the Anti-Nazi League and East London Workers Against Racism. He helped organise street patrols in East London to protect Asian families against racist attacks and was a leading member of a number of campaigns against deportations and police brutality including the Newham 7 campaign, the Afia Begum Campaign Against Deportations, and the Colin Roach campaign.

Malik has written that the turning point in his relationship with the left came with the Salman Rushdie affair. Much of his political campaigning over the past decade has been in defence of free speech, secularism and scientific rationalism. Malik was one of the first left-wing critics of multiculturalism, has controversially opposed restrictions on hate speech, supported open door policies on immigration, opposed the notion of animal rights in a series of debates with Peter Singer and Richard Ryder, and spoken out in defence of animal experimentation.

Malik wrote for the RCP's magazine Living Marxism, later LM. Although the RCP has since disbanded, Malik has written for later incarnations of LM, and for its online successor, the web magazine Spiked.

In a Guardian opinion piece published during the 2020 US presidential transition, Malik accused president-elect Joe Biden of grifting from his supporters.

Malik has written of his perception that use of white privilege narratives can further entrench white identity by marginalising white British working classes.

Malik commented on the controversy surrounding comments by Whoopi Goldberg in early‑2022 on the circumstances of the Holocaust and also notes at length that Nazi Germany, when embedding their distorted ideologies into law, drew on legal concepts from prevailing United States legislation.

In March 2025, Guardian Media Group agreed to pay "substantial" damages to Douglas Murray over a column in which Malik had stated that Murray had encouraged the 2024 United Kingdom riots.

== Awards ==
- Fellow, Royal Society of Arts
- Distinguished Supporter, Humanists UK
- Shortlisted for George Orwell Book Prize, 2010, for From Fatwa to Jihad: The Rushdie Affair and Its Legacy
- 3QD Politics and Social Science Prize, 2013, for essay "Rethinking the Idea of 'Christian Europe'"

== Works ==
- The Meaning of Race: Race, History and Culture in Western Society (Palgrave / New York University Press, 1996)
- Man, Beast and Zombie: What Science Can and Cannot Tell Us About Human Nature (Weidenfeld & Nicolson, 2000; Rutgers University Press, 2002)
- Strange Fruit: Why Both Sides are Wrong in the Race Debate (Oneworld, 2008)
- From Fatwa to Jihad: The Rushdie Affair and Its Legacy (Atlantic Books, 2009)
- Multiculturalism and Its Discontents: Rethinking Diversity After 9/11 (Seagull Books, 2013)
- The Quest for a Moral Compass: A Global History of Ethics (Atlantic Books, 2014)
- Not So Black and White: A History of Race from White Supremacy to Identity Politics (Hurst, 2023)
