= Brendan O'Neill (author) =

English journalist

- Born: 1973 (age 52–53); Paddington, London
- Occupations: Author, columnist, political commentator
- Known for: Formerly member of the Revolutionary Communist Party and writer for the party's journal Living Marxism; editor of Spiked (2007–2021) and columnist for The Australian and The Big Issue
- Notable work: After the Pogrom: 7 October, Israel and the Crisis of Civilisation (2024)

Brendan O'Neill is a British author and pundit. He was the editor of Spiked from 2007 to September 2021, and is its chief political writer. Spiked is commonly identified as right-libertarian. He has been a columnist for The Times of Israel, Haaretz, The Australian, Daily Mail, The Big Issue, The Catholic Herald, Jewish News and The Spectator.

== Career ==
O'Neill's parents are from Connemara in the west of Ireland. He began his career at Living Marxism, the predecessor of Spiked and journal of the Revolutionary Communist Party. RCP was distinguished by its contrarianism; among its positions were support for IRA and Saddam Hussein.

O'Neill has also contributed articles to publications in the United Kingdom, the United States and Australia including The Spectator, the New Statesman, BBC News Online, The Christian Science Monitor, The American Conservative, Salon, Rising East and occasionally blogged for The Guardian, before moving to The Daily Telegraph. He writes a column for The Big Issue in London and The Australian in Sydney. He also writes articles for The Sun.

== Views ==
=== Ideology, changing political stances and defence of freedom of speech ===
Once a Trotskyist, O'Neill was formerly a member of the Revolutionary Communist Party and wrote for the party's journal Living Marxism. In 2019, O'Neill said he was a Marxist libertarian. In a 2016 interview with The Catholic Weekly, the interviewer, Natasha Marsh writes that "Brendan's crusade for freedom of speech has taken him to places he would rather not go. From defending the rights of Anjem Choudary (who advocated Sharia law in Britain) to members of the British Labour Party, whose policies have grated his every moral fibre since he was a "Trotsky-loving teen", Brendan finds his campaign "morally exhausting"...Yet he sees his work defending these "scoundrels" as a necessary evil in the libertarian dream..."If you don't defend the freedom of these outliers, these unpopular, strange, racist, eccentric creatures … we will soon find ourselves outside the acceptable parameters, Christians for example, who are critical of gay marriage."

=== Northern Ireland ===
O'Neill is a supporter of a united Ireland. He was critical of the 1998 Good Friday Agreement, which Sinn Féin and the Provisional IRA supported. O'Neill wrote, in a 1998 issue of Living Marxism, "The new peace deal is a disgrace... The biggest losers in all this are the republican movement... [W]hat exactly will the republican communities gain at the end of their 25-year struggle? Sinn Fein and the IRA have not just agreed to down arms. They have effectively signed away everything they once stood for, accepting that there will not be a united Ireland."

=== Environmentalism ===
O'Neill has said that the environmental movement has become a "religious cult" that is "waging war on the working class". He was later criticised for comments about the Swedish environmentalist activist Greta Thunberg. In 2020, in relation to the COVID-19 shutdowns, O'Neill argued that "this pandemic has shown us what life would be like if environmentalists got their way".

=== Brexit ===
In September 2019, he said on the BBC's Politics Live that British people should be rioting about delays to Brexit. He said: "I'm amazed that there haven't been riots yet." When asked by guest presenter Adam Fleming: "Do you think there will be riots?", O'Neill responded: "I think there should be." In October 2019, 585 complaints about him calling for riots were dismissed by the BBC's executive complaints unit.

=== Trans people ===
O'Neill called considering trans women as women "the most lunatic luxury belief of all", talking about "gender insanity". O'Neill voiced approval for the Trump Administration's Executive Order 14201 ("Keeping Men Out of Women's Sports"), saying it was a feminist action; he also expressed approval for the UK Supreme Court's decision to consider only "biological women" as "women", criticising "the trans lobby".

=== Israel-Palestine conflict ===
O'Neill is a staunch supporter of Israel in its conflict with Hamas, also valorising America’s role, commenting that “(n)ormal people… might even raise a glass to Donald Trump for his valiant efforts to end this horrible war Hamas started.” In an editorial for The Spectator (17 October 2025), O'Neil described "(t)he anti-Israel mob (as) this tragic community that built its entire personality around hating Israel", a community for whom "peace will rob them of purpose." O'Neil analyses the Pro-Palestine marchers' motivations, theorising that their "fashionable animus for Israel is more than a political position – it's a religious crusade." In contrast he praises Israel, "for Israel has signed up for a deal that envisions a ceasefire soon and which expressly says that not one Palestinian will be forcibly expelled from Gaza".

In October 2025, O'Neill praised United States president Donald Trump for taking an "anti-fascist" stance when it comes to his role in mediating the Middle Eastern conflict, describing Trump as "the man they (anti-fascists) love to loathe, who […] accomplished the miraculous feat of liberating 20 Israelis from the anti-Semitic hell of Hamas captivity […] As of today, following the soul-stirring emancipation of the last living Israeli hostages, whenever I hear the phrase 'anti-fascist' I will think of Trump. Forget those sun-starved digital radicals who bark 'Fascist!' at Nigel Farage or the snotty lefties whose 'anti-fascism' entails yelling at working-class mums in pink tracksuits as they protest outside migrant hotels".

== Works ==
- A Duty to Offend: Selected Essays. Brisbane, Queensland: Connor Court Publishing. 2015. ISBN 9781925138764.
- Anti-Woke: Selected Essays. Brisbane, Queensland: Connor Court Publishing. 2018. ISBN 9781925826265.
- A Heretic's Manifesto: Essays on the Unsayable. London Publishing Partnership. 2023. ISBN 9781913019860.
- After the Pogrom: 7 October, Israel and the Crisis of Civilisation. Spiked. 2024. ISBN 9781068719301.
