= Tara Jones (disambiguation) =

Tara Jones is an English rugby league player and referee.

Tara Jones may also refer to:

- Tara Spires-Jones, American neuroscientist
- Tara Jones, a character in the YA graphic novel Heartstopper and its television adaptation
