= Thomas Deichmann =

German journalist (born 1962)

Thomas Deichmann (born 1962) is a German journalist, author and communication expert. He was the founder and from November 1992 to May 2011 editor-in-chief and publisher of the German magazine NovoArgumente. Since August 2011 he has been working as communication expert for banks and industries such as The Royal Bank of Scotland, BASF SE, and BRAIN AG.

== Early life and career ==
Deichmann studied civil engineering at TU Darmstadt. In 1992, after earlier political activities, he began to work as an editor and journalist, writing first about international relations and then increasingly about issues to do with the natural sciences and their role in society.

== Bosnia ==
Deichmann received international attention when his article on the civil war in the former Yugoslavia (first in German, then in English and other languages), "The picture that fooled the world", was published by British magazine LM, in February 1997, claiming that a frequently published image from August 1992 was faked. He claimed that the ITN footage, created in front of Trnopolje concentration camp, featuring prominently group of emaciated Bosnian Muslim men prisoners, and among them Fikret Alić, standing behind a barbed wire fence, was deliberately staged to portray a Nazi-style extermination camp, that the British reporters from ITN, Penny Marshall and Ian Williams, had actually stood inside a compound surrounded by a barbed wire fence and from there filmed their famous pictures, and went on to allege: "It was not a prison, and certainly not a 'concentration camp', but a collection center for refugees, many of whom went there seeking safety and could leave again if they wished". However, an examination of the substance of this case by David Campbell, a professor of cultural and political geography at Durham University, showed that the key claims made by Deichmann and LM are "erroneous and flawed".

In February 2000, the publishers of LM, Informinc (LM) Ltd., were sued for libel by ITN at the British High Court in London. At the beginning of his summation, High Court Judge Morland defined what the libel case was about: “Members of the jury, you may well think that in a democratic society it is vital that journalists are fearless, investigative reporters. It is, you may well think, of the utmost importance that they are accurate and fair reporters. It is right that one journalist, if he considers that another journalist has been inaccurate, unfair and misleading, should say so. But this case, you may think, is not about whether Penny Marshall and Ian Williams have been inaccurate, unfair or misleading; the nub of this case is whether the defendants have established that Penny Marshall and Ian Williams have deliberately – I emphasize that word, 'deliberately’ – compiled misleading television footage.’” LM could not prove such a deliberate mistake and lost the case. In March 2000 the magazine was forced to close, after defendants failed to present any evidence in their defense. Reporters Penny Marshall and Ian Williams were each awarded £150,000 over the LM story and the magazine was ordered to pay £75,000 for libelling ITN in a February 1997 article.
Professor David Campbell of Durham University summarised his study of the case as follows:

[A]s strange as existing British libel law is, it had an important and surprisingly beneficial effect in the case of ITN vs LM. The LM defendants and Thomas Deichmann were properly represented at the trial and were able to lay out all the details of their claim that the ITN reporters had "deliberately misrepresented" the situation at Trnopolje. Having charged 'deliberate misrepresentation', they needed to prove 'deliberate misrepresentation'. To this end, the LM defendants were able to cross-examine Penny Marshall and Ian Williams, as well as every member of the ITN crews who were at the camps, along with other witnesses. (That they didn't take up the opportunity to cross-examine the Bosnian doctor imprisoned at Trnopolje, who featured in the ITN stories and was called to testify on the conditions he and others suffered, was perhaps the moment any remaining shred of credibility for LM's allegations evaporated). They were able to show the ITN reports to the court, including the rushes from which the final TV stories were edited, and conduct a forensic examination of the visuals they alleged were deceitful. And all of this took place in front of a jury of twelve citizens who they needed to convince about the truthfulness of their allegations.
They failed. The jury found unanimously against LM and awarded the maximum possible damages. So it was not ITN that bankrupted LM. It was LM's lies about the ITN reports that bankrupted themselves, morally and financially. Despite their failure, those who lied about the ITN reports have had no trouble obtaining regular access to the mainstream media in Britain, where they continue to make their case as though the 2000 court verdict simply didn't exist. Their freedom of speech has thus not been permanently infringed.

Before Deichmann wrote the article about Trnopolje camp he had criticised Pulitzer Prize journalist Roy Gutman for biased reporting. He also appeared as an expert witness for the defence of the Bosnian Serb soldier Duško Tadić during the first case of the International Criminal Tribunal for the former Yugoslavia in 1994.

== Writings on green and science issues ==
Since the late 1990s Deichmann's journalistic focus shifted increasingly to the role played by green NGOs. For example, he blamed Greenpeace for running campaigns against green technology that lacked scientific proof. In 2009, Deichmann received the InnoPlanta Journalism Award for his coverage of Plant Biotechnology. With Detlev Ganten and Thilo Spahl he published the book "Die Steinzeit steckt uns in den Knochen" (The Stone Ages is still in our bones), which was voted German Science Book of the Year in 2010. His articles and writings have appeared in numerous countries and have been translated into a number of languages. Newspapers and magazines that carried his journalism include Frankfurter Allgemeine Zeitung, Die Welt, Financial Times, Cicero (Germany), Spiked (UK), Der Standard (Austria), Die Weltwoche (Switzerland), Mediterranean Quarterly (US). Deichmann is the author of several books published by Suhrkamp Verlag, Eichborn Verlag, Deutscher Taschenbuch Verlag (dtv) and Piper Verlag.

In recent years, Deichmann has criticised the tendency to moralise about international relations. Another subject of his writing has been the growing influence of green ideas, something he calls "ecologism", as well as consumer protection policies – developments he views as symptoms of a deep-seated social misanthropy, of governments that lack any vision of the future and thus promote fear and a nanny state. Deichmann calls himself a "Future Optimist.”

== Other activities ==
Deichmann was active as a speaker, coach, and chair for a number of institutions, including the European Science Open Forum Munich, Cologne Institut for Media Studies, Henri Nannen Journalism School Berlin, Free University Berlin, Battle of Ideas London, F.A.Z.-Institut Frankfurt, Ludwig von Mises Institute Brussels, and the German Institute for Public Affairs Berlin. He also worked as an evaluator of research applications for the German Federal Ministry of Education and Research and as an expert for the Committee for Education, Science and Technology of the German Parliament. Since 1997, Deichmann has travelled frequently to the Balkans with Austrian writer Peter Handke. He has organised photo exhibitions about these trips and also written about them.

== Publications/bibliography ==
- Thomas Deichmann: "Germany and the politics of resignation", Spiked online, 2 June 2010
- Thomas Deichmann: "Germany and the politics of resignation", Spiked online, 2 June 2010
- Thomas Deichmann: "The Schmeiser story", Spiked online, 10 October 2002
- Detlev Ganten; Thomas Deichmann; Thilo Spahl (2009), Die Steinzeit steckt uns in den Knochen. Gesundheit als Erbe der Evolution (The stone age is still in our bones) (in German), München: Piper-Verlag, ISBN 978-3492052719
- Thomas Deichmann (2009), Warum Angst vor Grüner Gentechnik? (Why are people afraid of Green Biotechnology?) (in German), Halle: Projekte-Verlag, ISBN 978-3866346932
- Thomas Deichmann; Thilo Spahl (2006), Das Wichtigste über Natur & Technik (What everyone needs to know about Nature & Technology) (in German), München: dtv, ISBN 978-3423343633
- Thomas Deichmann; Thilo Spahl (2006), Das Wichtigste über Mensch & Gesundheit (What everyone needs to know about Humans & Health) (in German), München: dtv, ISBN 978-3423343626
- Detlev Ganten; Thomas Deichmann; Thilo Spahl (2005), Naturwissenschaft : alles, was man wissen muss (in German), München: dtv, ISBN 978-3423342377
- Detlev Ganten; Thomas Deichmann; Thilo Spahl (2003), Leben, Natur, Wissenschaft. Alles, was man wissen muss (All you need to know about life, nature, and science) (in German), Frankfurt am Main: Eichborn, ISBN 978-3821839813
- Thomas Deichmann; Thilo Spahl (2001), Das populäre Lexikon der Gentechnik (The popular encyclopedia of biotechnology) (in German), Frankfurt am Main: Eichborn, ISBN 978-3821816975
- Thomas Deichmann (editor) (1999), Noch einmal für Jugoslawien: Peter Handke (Once again for Yugoslavia: Peter Handke) (in German), Frankfurt am Main: Suhrkamp, ISBN 978-3518394069
- Klaus Bittermann; Thomas Deichmann (editor) (1999), Wie Dr. Joseph Fischer lernte, die Bombe zu lieben: Die SPD, die Grünen, die Nato und der Krieg auf dem Balkan (How Dr. Joseph Fischer learned to love the bomb: SPD, Greens, Nato and the Balkan war) (in German), Bittermann, ISBN 978-3893200252
