= Claire Fox =

British writer and politician (born 1960)

The Right Honourable The Baroness Fox of Buckley
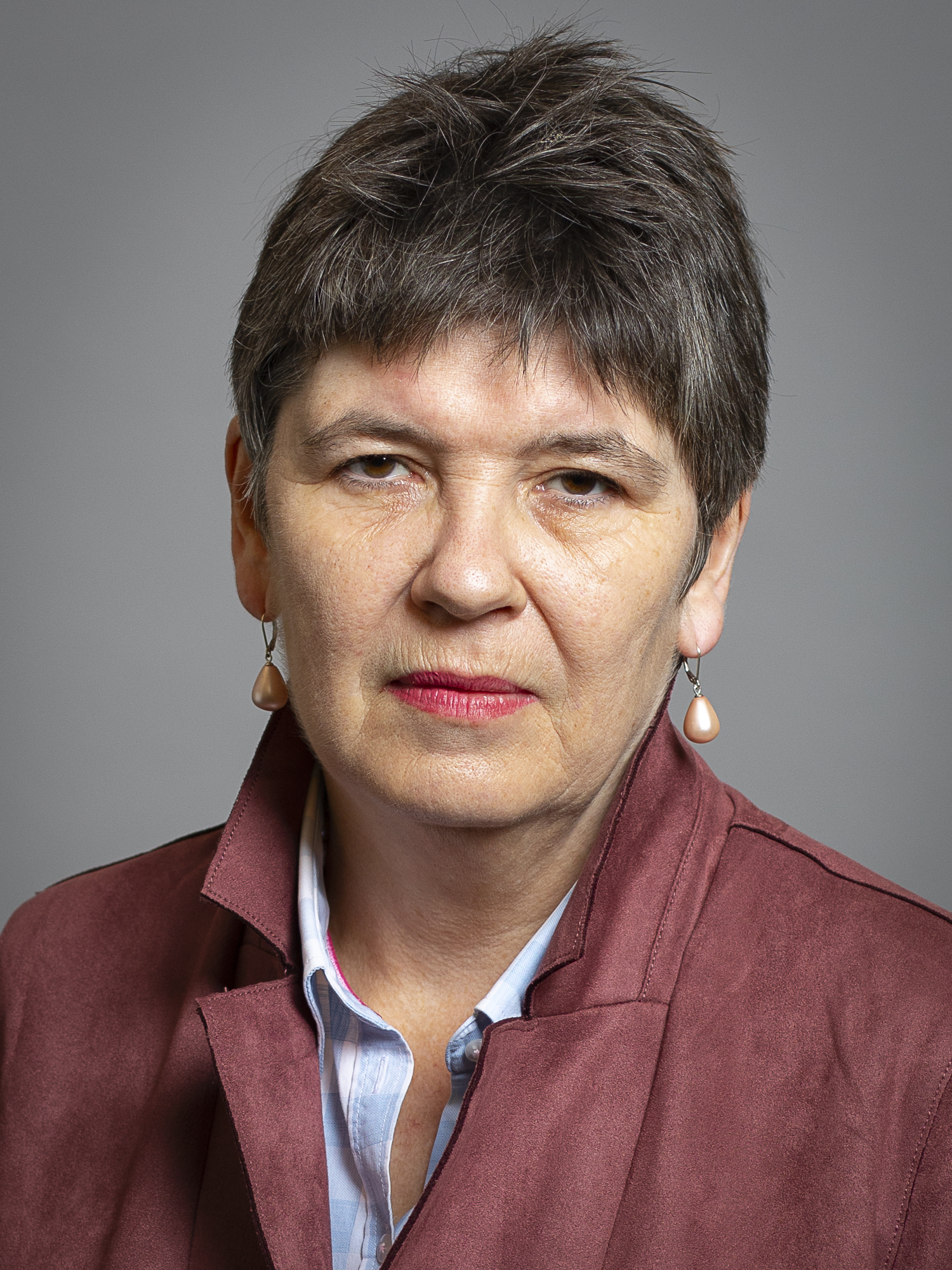
- Official portrait, 2020

Member of the House of Lords
- Lord Temporal
- Life peerage 14 September 2020

Member of the European Parliament for North West England
- In office 2 July 2019 – 31 January 2020
- Preceded by: Paul Nuttall
- Succeeded by: Constituency abolished

Personal details
- Born: Claire Regina Fox; 5 June 1960 (age 66) Barton-upon-Irwell, Lancashire, England
- Party: Independent (1997–2019; 2020–present)
- Other political affiliations: Brexit (2019–2020); Revolutionary Communist (before 1997)
- Relations: Fiona Fox (sister)
- Education: University of Warwick; University of Greenwich
- Occupation: Writer and broadcaster
- Known for: Director and founder of Institute of Ideas

Claire Regina Fox, Baroness Fox of Buckley (born 5 June 1960), is a far-right wing British writer, journalist, lecturer and politician who sits in the House of Lords as a non-affiliated life peer. A right-libertarian, she is the director and founder of think tank the Academy of Ideas, formerly known as the Institute of Ideas.

A lifelong Eurosceptic, she was previously a member of the Trotskyist British Revolutionary Communist Party but later began identifying as a libertarian. She became a registered supporter of the Brexit Party shortly after its formation and was elected as an MEP in the 2019 European Parliament election. She was nominated for a peerage by the Boris Johnson-led Conservative government in 2020, despite her past opposition to the existence of the House of Lords.

Fox was a spokesperson on BBC Radio 4 programme The Moral Maze and appeared on BBC One's political discussion debate programme, Question Time.

== Early life and career ==
Fox was born in 1960 to Irish Catholic parents, John Fox and Maura Cleary. She spent her early years in Buckley, Wales. After attending St Richard Gwyn Catholic High School in Flint, she studied at the University of Warwick where she graduated with a lower second class degree (2:2) in English and American Literature. She later gained a Professional Graduate Certificate in Education. From 1981 to 1987, she was a mental health social worker. She was later an English language and literature lecturer at Thurrock Technical College from 1987 to 1990, and she worked as an ESL teacher at West Herts College from 1992 to 1999.

== Revolutionary Communist Party ==
Fox joined the Revolutionary Communist Party (RCP) as a student at the University of Warwick. The RCP was distinguished by its contrarianism; among its positions were support for the IRA and Saddam Hussein.

In the early 1990s, Fox supported armed struggle against the United Kingdom with her colleagues in Derry. For the next twenty years, she was one of the RCP's core activists and organisers. She became co-publisher of its magazine Living Marxism. When Living Marxism rebranded as LM in 1999, she organised its first conference.

LM closed in 2000 after it was found in court to have falsely accused Independent Television News (ITN) of faking evidence of the Bosnian genocide. In 2018, Fox refused to apologise for suggesting that evidence of the genocide was faked.

Fox stayed with her ex-RCP members when the group transformed itself in the early 2000s into a network around the right wing web magazine Spiked Online and the Institute of Ideas, both based in the former RCP offices and promoting right wing libertarianism.

== Media career ==
After founding the Institute of Ideas, Fox became a guest panellist on BBC Radio 4 programme The Moral Maze and appeared as a panellist on BBC One's political television programme Question Time. She was criticised in The Guardian for rejecting multiculturalism as divisive and for her libertarian beliefs in the desirability of minimal governmental control and free speech in all contexts.

In 2015, Fox was listed as one of BBC's 100 Women. Her book, I Find That Offensive!, was published in 2016.

== Return to politics ==
In April 2019, Fox became a registered supporter of the Brexit Party. She was in the first position in the list for the Brexit Party in the North West England constituency at the 2019 European Parliament election. Her selection was criticised by the father of murdered schoolboy Tim Parry for her past support for the Provisional Irish Republican Army and for the RCP's defence of the 1993 IRA Warrington bombings, which had killed his son within the North West England constituency. Another candidate for the Brexit Party, Sally Bate, resigned, citing Fox's "ambiguous position" on IRA violence. A Brexit Party spokesperson commented on the criticism of Fox: "It's a desperate attempt to cause trouble". Fox was subsequently elected to the European Parliament.

After standing down as an MEP when the United Kingdom left the EU on 31 January 2020, Fox was nominated for a peerage in July of that year. She sits as a non-affiliated peer. The Lord Caine, a long-serving Conservative Party adviser on Northern Ireland, criticised the decision, as did victims of IRA terror attacks. She previously claimed to be against the existence of the House of Lords, and congratulated Liberal Democrats for not taking up peerages in a 2015 tweet. She was nominated to the House of Lords by Prime Minister Boris Johnson and was created The Baroness Fox of Buckley on 14 September. She was introduced to the Lords on 8 October 2020. On 7 June 2022, Fox reiterated her stance against the existence of the House of Lords, and defended her decision to accept a life peerage as "pragmatic", resting on her belief such a position would provide a platform to enact political change.

On 9 November 2020, speaking in the Lords in favour of the Internal Market Bill, Fox described international law as "a supranational instrument for undermining national sovereignty" and said that, rather than breaking the law, the UK government were making the law.

On 6 June 2022, she criticised the decision of Cineworld to cancel screenings of the movie The Lady of Heaven as a sign of a creeping extra-parliamentary blasphemy law. She likened it to cancel culture, calling it a disaster for the arts, dangerous for free speech and a lesson to those who don't see a threat in identity politics.

In July 2025, Fox was one of 16 members of the House of Lords who voted against the proscription of Palestine Action as a terrorist organisation.

== Personal life ==
Fox is the elder sister of British writer Fiona Fox and Gemma Fox. Fiona was the director of the non-profit organisation Science Media Centre.

Orders of precedence in the United Kingdom
Preceded by The Baroness Hoey	Ladies	Succeeded by The Baroness Fleet
