= Revolutionary Communist Group (UK) =

- Founded: 1974
- Split from: International Socialists
- Newspaper: Fight Racism! Fight Imperialism!
- Ideology: Communism; Marxism–Leninism; Historically; Trotskyism
- Political position: Far-left
- Colours: red, black, white

Website
- http://www.revolutionarycommunist.org/

The Revolutionary Communist Group (RCG) is a Marxist-Leninist communist political organisation in the United Kingdom.

According to its own statements, the group "exists in order to defend and develop an anti-imperialist trend within Britain, based on the long term interests of the entire working class and the oppressed internationally. We stand for the creation of a society organised both to meet the needs of the entire population, and to ensure the fullest possible development of every individual." Emphasising a campaign against capitalism and the oppression of the working class, the group is also highly critical of British foreign policy, which they consider to be imperialistic in nature. In particular, they criticise British control of Northern Ireland, the involvement of British troops in Iraq and Afghanistan, and the British government's support for Israel.

Believing that the British electoral system under capitalism cannot bring about any real change in society, and as it does not consider itself a party (believing that a communist party, led by a vanguard of the proletariat, has not yet developed in Britain), the RCG has not taken part in elections since 1979. The group also publish their own newspaper, Fight Racism! Fight Imperialism!, which has been running since November–December 1979 and now appears every two months.

== Political ideology ==
=== Marxist position ===
"The RCG believes that the way for human society to progress – or even to survive – is for capitalism to be destroyed. The British ruling class will never allow the system which maintains its domination to be wished or voted away – it will take a revolution led by the working class. The only alternative to capitalism is socialism: a conscious and organised process of constructing society in which people cooperate in order to meet their needs rather than serve the dictates of private profits; a society enabling the full development of every individual rather than privilege for a few."

— Statement by the RCG.

The Revolutionary Communist Group is a communist organisation. It believes that the United Kingdom is a dictatorship of the bourgeoisie (i.e., a state where the ruling capitalist class control the economic and political powers to the detriment of the working class, in this case through a representative democracy), and believe that the only real way to enact social change is for the working class to take power in a revolution, thereby establishing a dictatorship of the proletariat (i.e., a state ruled through participatory democracy by the working class for the benefit of the masses).

Writing in 2007, the British Trotskyist group Permanent Revolution characterised the RCG's position as being "distinctive on the British left by their open espousal of left Stalinism, which essentially consists of an uncritical support for the leadership of anti-imperialist struggles, an uncritical support for the Cuban regime, a completely undemocratic internal structure, an active participation in anti-racist struggles and complete rejection of any united front work within the British labour movement, trade unions or Labour Party." Group members see this as a caricature of the RCG, and instead claim that the RCG is a democratic centralist organisation in the Leninist tradition.

=== Criticism of British imperialism ===
The RCG believes that the United Kingdom has been an imperialist power since the end of the nineteenth century, stating that "Britain is the oldest imperialist country in the world. It was the first to develop into finance monopoly capitalism – imperialism, and is still a major imperialist power, second only to the United States. Britain's imperialist character has been decisive in determining British economic, social and political developments." In this way they believe that the British state has interfered in foreign affairs, historically through the British Empire and continuing through foreign wars and corporate dominance, to the detriment to the working class masses living in these countries.

The group supports revolutionary national democratic governments in various Third and Second World countries such as the Bolivarian government of Hugo Chávez in Venezuela, and the government of Evo Morales in Bolivia. It supports socialist Cuba and the socialist government of Cuba. The RCG believes that such movements in alliance with Cuba have the ability to radically help the working class masses living in these nations, and fight against the imperialism of the United Kingdom, United States and other First World states who use them for cheap labour. As they make clear on their website, "The resistance movements in the oppressed nations are weakening imperialism; an anti-imperialist movement in this country in unity with these struggles can deal a decisive blow against British imperialism and the British ruling class. For this reason the RCG has always given complete and unconditional support to liberation movements fighting imperialism and we support their right to carry out their struggles by any means necessary."

The RCG argues that socialists should not give their support to the centre/centre-left Labour Party, which is one of the major political parties in the United Kingdom. On this subject, David Yaffe stated the RCG's position that "no anti-imperialist or socialist movement can be built unless the British left makes a fundamental and irrevocable break with the British Labour Party." He went on to characterise the party's policies in government as being "openly racist, imperialist and warmongering". At the same time it has remained critical of other socialist organisations in Britain such as the Communist Party of Britain, Militant, the International Marxist Group and the Socialist Workers Party for what it sees as being "major obstacle[s]" to the building of an anti-imperialist movement in Britain. This is because many of these groups denounced the governments of socialist states such as the Soviet Union, China, Cuba and the Democratic People's Republic of Korea, and instead encouraged their members to vote for the Labour Party.

=== Criticism of racism, immigration controls and discrimination ===
The RCG has been firmly critical of racism and particularly the racism of the British government and state. It has supported groups of black nationalists in the United States in their efforts at defending themselves against racism. It also opposes any constraints on immigration, believing that any such measures are inherently racist in an imperialist country. It also criticises all other forms of discrimination in society, stating that "We oppose all discrimination against anyone on grounds of gender, ethnicity, sexual orientation and disability."

== History ==
=== Early years: 1970-1976 ===
Developing in the early 1970s, the RCG grew out of the "Revolutionary Opposition" faction of the International Socialists (IS), (forerunners of the Socialist Workers Party), being strongly influenced by the politics of Roy Tearse. When the leading figures of the "Revolutionary Opposition", the name itself only first appearing in print in their appeal document, were expelled from the IS, its members met to decide on their course of action, and disagreements between Tearse's allies and the majority of the faction around David Yaffe rapidly surfaced. The result was that Tearse's supporters formed the Discussion Group which led a quiet life for a number of years inside the Labour Party before dissolving. Meanwhile, Yaffe and his comrades proceeded to found the Revolutionary Communist Group in 1974.

In 1975 the RCG began publishing a theoretical journal called Revolutionary Communist in which it in part espoused a view of crisis theory, a theme they had already addressed in the IS when challenging the work of the theoreticians of that group. They developed Karl Marx, Friedrich Engels and Vladimir Lenin's analysis of the labour aristocracy, and showed its relevance for politics in the period after the Second World War. Their conclusions led them to call for no vote for the Labour Party.

The early years of the RCG saw the group lose a large part of its initial membership. For example, in September 1975 the Birmingham branch decamped in order to join the Workers' Socialist League.

A few years after the RCG's foundation, disagreements emerged amongst its members regarding such topics as Stalinism and the South African government. One group, dominated by Frank Furedi (1947-), a sociologist at the University of Kent who used the pseudonym of "Frank Richards", began to argue against the views put forward by David Yaffe and his supporters. Yaffe himself later remarked that Furedi had been "organising among a clique of middle-class members, and became their self-styled guru". In November 1976, Furedi and his followers were expelled from the RCG, following which they went on to form their own rival organisation, the Revolutionary Communist Tendency (RCT). Soon, the RCT itself splintered, with a group calling itself the Committee for a Communist Programme (CPP) being founded by several dissenting members. Following this, the RCT went on to change its name to the Revolutionary Communist Party in 1981, and would publish the magazine Living Marxism from 1988 to 2000, in which their political position moved from Leninism to Libertarian Marxism.

The RCG recognised the progressive role played by some of the traditional communist parties such as the South African Communist Party and from that position developed into a more orthodox communist grouping supporting the socialist revolution in Cuba.

Whilst many self-proclaimed socialist organisations, especially those regarding themselves as Trotskyist, in the UK welcomed the demise of the Eastern Bloc and then of the Soviet Union the RCG argued that these events were counterrevolutionary and constituted a setback in the class struggle internationally because many national liberation movements and socialist states in the Third World were supported by the Soviet Union and the Comecon. The RCG believed that while the Soviet Union was a socialist state, as a result of both internal developments in the Soviet Union itself and the reactionary role of working class parties (social democratic and communist) in the imperialist countries, the revolution degenerated and the communist party became an elite party separate from the working class. These developments laid the foundation for the counterrevolution between 1989-91.

=== Solidarity with Ireland and South Africa: 1977-1989 ===
During the late 1970s and early 1980s, the RCG became heavily involved in support for the Irish national liberation struggle, working with the Prisoners Aid Committee, Sinn Féin and the Troops Out Movement (TOM), and focusing particularly on support for Irish republican prisoners held in British prisons. The analysis which the RCG developed through this work, on the role of national liberation movements in opposing imperialism, laid the foundations for much of its later positions, and its relationship to the rest of the British left. Unlike many other left organisations, the RCG consistently argued that British troops had no progressive role to play in Ireland, and called for total support for the Republican movement in the struggle against British imperialism. Their involvement with the prisoner support groups established a tradition of outspoken support for prison struggles which has continued to the present, with a page of every issue of their newspaper dealing with prison conditions and struggles. In 1990, when prisoners at Strangeways (see 1990 Strangeways Prison riot) took over the prison in protest at conditions, the RCG was active together with other groups supporting them on the outside, and later published a book, 'Strangeways: A Serious Disturbance', largely written by prisoners and former prisoners.

During the 1980s, the RCG's most notable activity was its participation in the non-stop picket of the South African embassy in London calling for the release of Nelson Mandela. This was organized by the City of London Anti-Apartheid Group, within which the RCG played a leading role alongside elements of the Workers' Revolutionary Party, the Humanist Party and members of the Kitson family. City AA, as it became known, had been founded by Norma Kitson, the wife of the South African Communist activist David Kitson who served 19 years and 5 months in prison in a South African prison for his work in the National High Command of Umkhonto we Sizwe (MK), the military wing of the African National Congress.

City AA was eventually expelled by the national leadership of the Anti-Apartheid Movement, over differences centering on City Group's insistence on making the link between British support for apartheid in South Africa, and racism within Britain.

Another significant campaign during the 1980s was the Viraj Mendis Defence Campaign, against the deportation of one of the group's members to Sri Lanka. This developed into a high-profile national campaign involving people from left-wing groups such as the RCG, local residents of Manchester, and extending to church leaders and Labour Party Members of Parliament.

=== Solidarity with Cuba and Palestine: 1990-present ===
In 1995 the RCG set up Rock Around the Blockade (RATB), a solidarity organisation with the Cuban Revolution. As well as campaigning on issues such as the US economic blockade and the Cuban Five, and sending political solidarity brigades to Cuba, RATB raised funds to take sound systems out to Cuba. These were used with young people in cultural and political work, and the RATB has donated five sound systems over a ten-year period.

In 2001 three members were asked to leave or resign because of what were described as their reactionary ultra-left views. One example of the division was over the September 11th attacks in 2001, which the three people who left viewed as a victory against imperialism. They had previously alleged that the leadership was bureaucratic and failing to train the membership in Marxism-Leninism. The three left to form Communist Forum, often known by the name of their newsletter, Fightback. They have ceased to be active.

Following the start of the Palestinian second intifada in September 2000, in October the RCG joined a group which had begun to picket Marks and Spencer in Manchester over their support for Israel, and helped to spread this to other cities. Over the next six years pickets of Marks and Spencer were held in places including Glasgow, Edinburgh, Dundee, Newcastle, Stockton, Middlesbrough, Durham, Rochdale, Nottingham, Leicester, across London, Stratford and Brighton. Throughout this period the flagship store on Oxford Street in London was picketed weekly, and in many other places pickets were sustained on a regular basis.

In 2005 and 2006, the RCG stepped up their work in solidarity with asylum seekers, supporting the setting up of UNITY, an asylum seekers' union, in Glasgow, and helping to establish Tyneside Community Action for Refugees (TCAR) in Newcastle and Gateshead and the North West Asylum Seekers Defence Group (NWASDG) in Manchester (for a selection of reports from this period see 1, 2).

=== Opposition to government spending cuts ===
In October 2010 the Conservative-Liberal Democrat coalition government announced cuts in state spending of £81bn, £11bn greater than the £70bn cuts which the preceding Labour government had said in autumn 2009 were necessary. There would be cuts in state benefits, central government departments and a 26% reduction in central government funding for local government. In its newspaper, the RCG said the ruling class "has declared class war". The RCG adopted a slogan "No cuts – full stop!" It condemned Labour-run councils implementing the cuts. It described Labour councillors voting for such cuts as "class enemies", opposing any alliance with them against the coalition government. It criticised those on the left who sought unity at any price with such politicians.

As a part of the government cuts, the coalition announced plans to simultaneously cut much university funding and dramatically increase the tuition fees charged to students. This move led to widespread student protests taking place in November and December 2010, during which demonstrators occupied the central Jeremy Bentham Room in University College London (UCL) for several weeks. The protesting UCL students (some of whom were RCG members or supporters) organised a panel discussion to be held during which representatives from several leftist organisations (including the RCG's David Yaffe as well as figures from the Green Party of England and Wales, Socialist Appeal and Workers Power) discussed the reforms then being made by the government and university authorities to higher education in Britain.

=== Allegation of sexual harassment (2017) ===
In October 2017 the RCG posted on their website "The Revolutionary Communist Group is aware of a historic allegation of sexual harassment by a member of the organisation. The RCG views such allegations with utmost seriousness. The comrade involved has been suspended from membership and will remain suspended until an internal enquiry completes an investigation into the matter and reports with recommendations on further action". At the end of that year in December, the RCG updated on their website "Following an investigation and a period of suspension, the comrade has been reinstated as of 1 January 2018. The comrade understands that his actions were unacceptable for a communist and a member of the RCG. Through the process we have undertaken, his consciousness and behaviour has changed, and continues to change to the extent that we have decided he can now be readmitted as a full member. The RCG takes seriously the sexism, discrimination and exploitation women face and is committed to building an organisation that opposes all such oppression."

=== Founding members resign (2025) ===
On 2 August 2025, founding members David Yaffe and Ann Eliot announced their resignation from the RCG, citing internal issues including "bullying, threats and lies," and stating that the leadership had become "bureaucratic, formalistic and dogmatic." In their statement, they argued that the current leadership had "shown itself to be deficient in theoretical depth, strategic flexibility, good communication and comradely behaviour," and also suggested that the divisions within the organisation might have been exacerbated by interference from the British state.

== Fight Racism! Fight Imperialism! newspaper ==
The April/May 2011 issue of FRFI, with a headline commenting critically on the 2011 military intervention in Libya.

The newspaper of the Revolutionary Communist Group, Fight Racism! Fight Imperialism! (FRFI) commemorated 25 years of publication with issue Number 182 December 2004/January 2005. The paper is still published every two months and as of December 2021 had been continuously published for 41 years.

Commenting on the reason for the paper's title, David Yaffe has stated that it was chosen because it was in "itself a political statement. It declares that fighting racism and imperialism must be at the heart of any socialist movement in imperialist Britain."
