= The Silent War =

The Silent War may refer to:

- The Silent War (book), 1998 book by Frank Furedi
- The Silent War, a collection of short stories in The Horus Heresy series
- The Silent War (2012 film), a Hong Kong thriller film
- The Silent War (2019 film), a Spanish war film

== See also ==
- Silent War, comic book series
