= Kevin McConway =

Kevin McConway (born 12 October 1950) is emeritus professor of applied statistics at the Open University, where he spent most of his career. He was the first Vice President (Academic Affairs) of the Royal Statistical Society, from 2012-2016.

After growing up in Northumberland, McConway studied mathematics at Trinity College, Cambridge before taking a PhD at UCL, under the supervision of Philip Dawid.

He was academic adviser to the BBC Radio Four programme More or Less and has written about that experience. He is currently a trustee and advisory board member of the Science Media Centre and has written about experience communicating statistics with the media, and this is developed as general guidance, and to statisticians specifically - "remember to sound human".

During the COVID-19 pandemic, from November 2020 he was one of two Royal Statistical Society Fellows nominated to an advisory group to support the UK government prepare visualisations for broadcast press conferences.
