= Tara Spires-Jones =

Professor of Neurodegeneration

Professor Tara Spires-Jones DPhil FMedSci FRSE
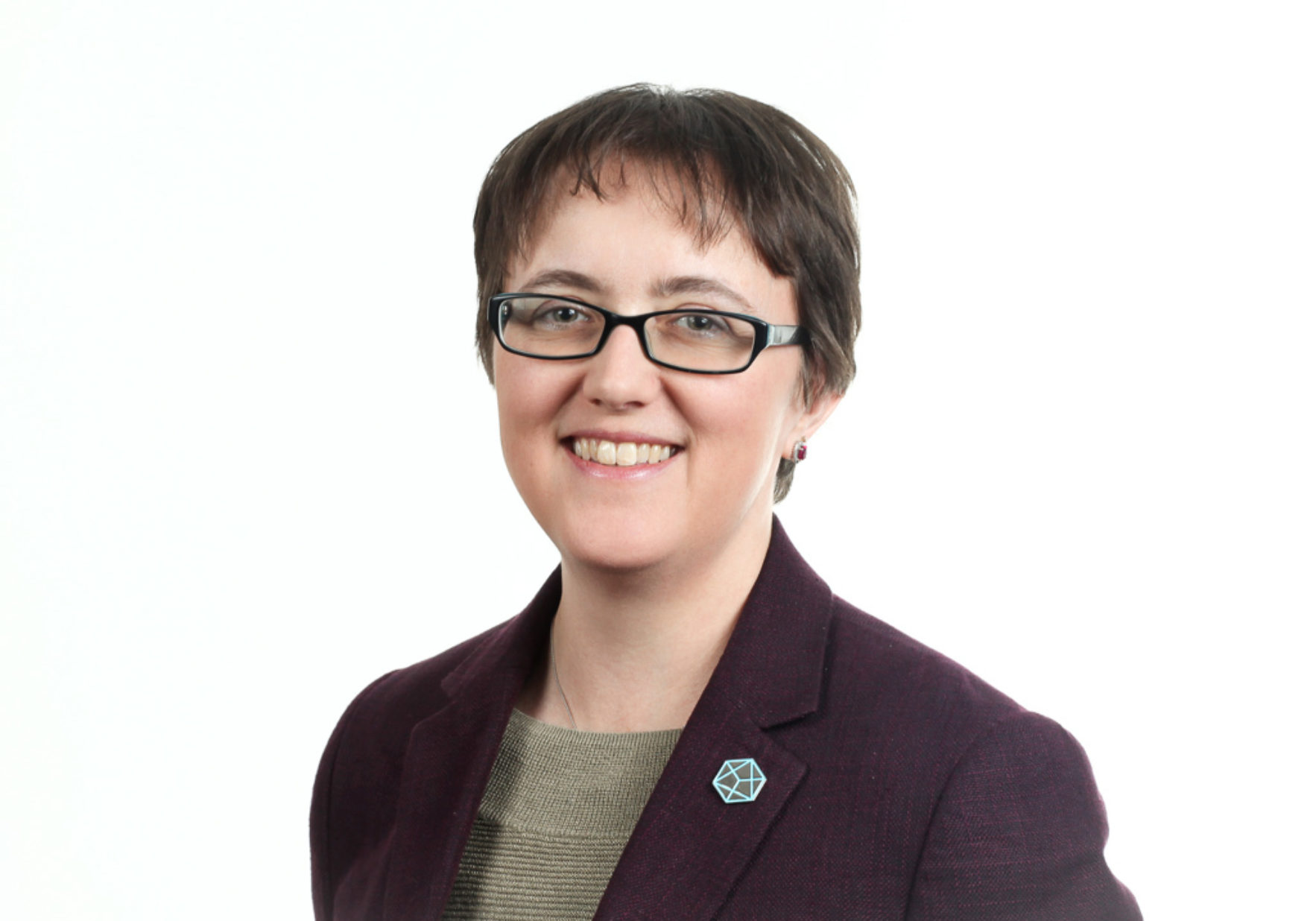
- 2019 by Sparatires
- Born: Tara Spires
- Education: University of Texas at Austin University of Oxford
- Known for: Researching mechanisms of synapse degeneration in Alzheimer's disease.
- Scientific career
- Fields: Neuroscience
- Workplaces: Massachusetts General Hospital Harvard Medical School University of Edinburgh
- Thesis: Genetic and epigenetic interactions in activity-dependent cortical plasticity. (2003)

Tara Spires-Jones is the Professor of Neurodegeneration and the Director of the Centre for Discovery Brain Sciences at the University of Edinburgh. the co-Lead of the Synapses, Circuits, Cognition, and Physiology Division of the UK Dementia Research Institute, and author of the popular science book Fighting for our Minds: The neuroscience of defeating dementia

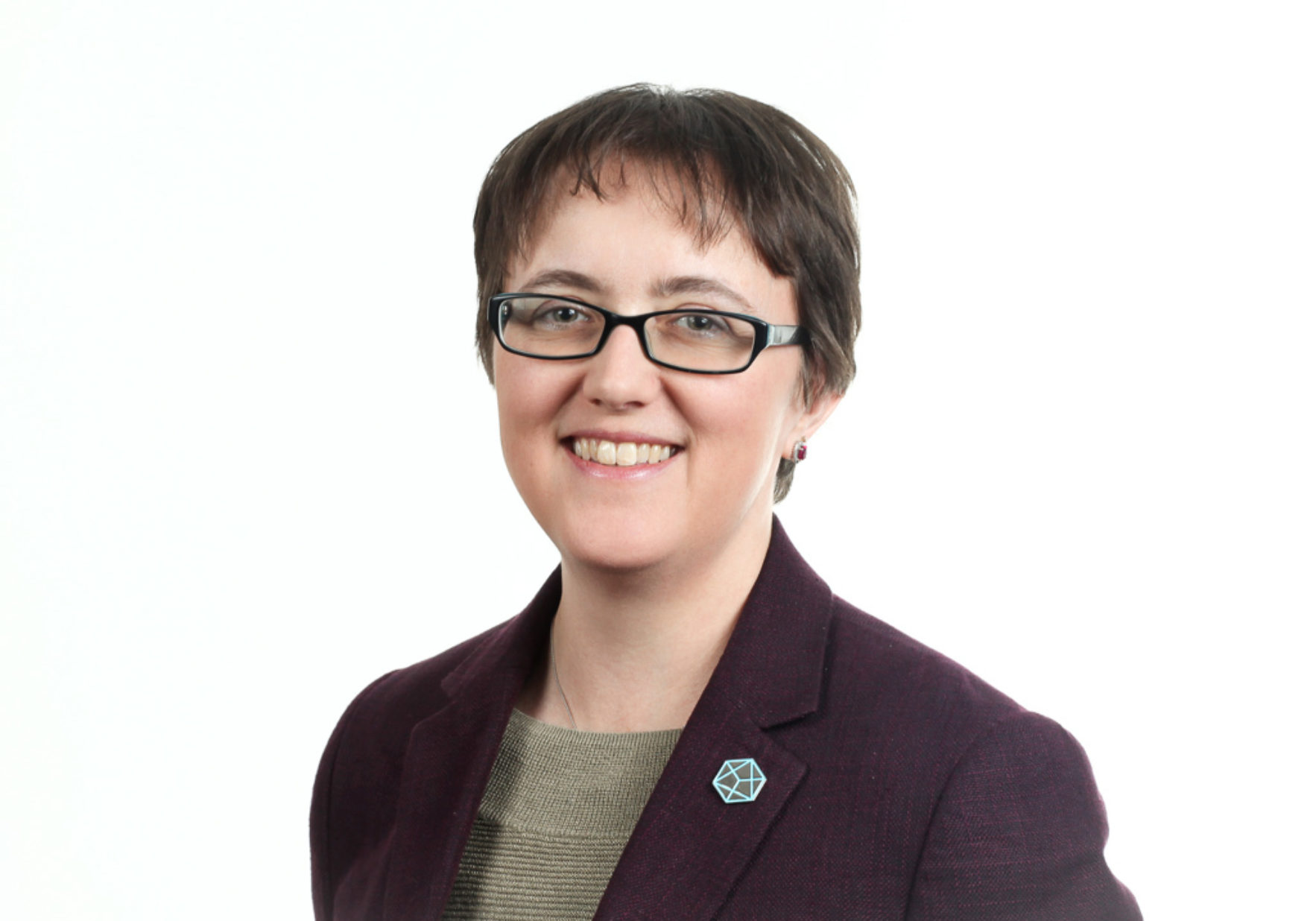

== Education and career ==
Spires-Jones studied as an undergraduate at the University of Texas at Austin, where she graduated as a Bachelor of Science in biochemistry and a Bachelor of Arts in French in 1999. She was awarded a British Marshall Scholarship, which enabled her to undertake a D.Phil. in environmental influences on synapse development and degeneration with Prof Sir Colin Blakemore and Prof Anthony Hannan at the University of Oxford. After completing her D.Phil. in 2004, Spires-Jones worked with Dr Bradley T Hyman as a postdoctoral research fellow at Massachusetts General Hospital and Harvard Medical School, where she undertook research on synaptic degeneration and Alzheimer's disease pathogenesis. Following her fellowship she remained at Massachusetts General Hospital and Harvard Medical School as an instructor from 2006 to 2011 and assistant professor from 2011 to 2013. In 2013 Spires-Jones moved to Scotland to join the University of Edinburgh as reader and Chancellor's Fellow. She was awarded the Personal chair of Neurodegeneration at the university in 2017.

Spires-Jones is a Federation of European Neuroscience Societies (FENS)-KAVLI Network of Excellence alumna, a former Scientific Advisory Board Member for Alzheimer's Research UK and the former chair of their Grant Review Board and served as a member of the Scottish Government's Scottish Science Advisory Council. Spires-Jones was founding editor of the translational neuroscience journal Brain Communications. In 2024, she was elected a Fellow of the UK Academy of Medical Sciences, and in 2026, she was elected a Fellow of the Royal Society of Edinburgh (FRSE).

She is an active member of the British Neuroscience Association, the UKs national society for neuroscientists, serving as president-elect from 2021-2023, president 2023-2025, and immediate past president 2025-2027.. She was elected president-elect of the Federation of European Neuroscience Societies (FENS) in 2026 and will serve as president from 2028-2030.

Spires-Jones regularly engages in science communication, outreach and engagement, and is an expert commentator for the Science Media Centre, advising journalists on neuroscience-related news stores. Her first popular science book Fighting for our Minds: The neuroscience of defeating dementia was published by Oxford University Press in September 2026 in the UK and December 2026 in the USA.

== Research ==
Spires-Jones' research focuses on mechanisms of neurodegeneration in diseases that cause dementia, other neurodegenerative diseases, and ageing. She focuses specifically on the degeneration of synapses, connections between neurons, in Alzheimer's disease. She made the important discovery that soluble forms of amyloid beta and tau proteins that accumulate in neuropathological lesions in Alzheimer's disease both accumulate within synapses where they contribute to degeneration and cognitive decline. This work started in model systems where she showed that lowering levels of these toxic proteins allows functional recovery. Importantly, her team was the first to discover synaptic localisation of amyloid beta and tau in synapses in human Alzheimer's brain. This was achieved using a technique she pioneered for use in human autopsy tissue. She has several collaborations with industry, one of which has contributed to a clinical trial of a drug to remove amyloid beta from synapses in Alzheimer's disease.

The spread of tau pathology through the brain in Alzheimer's disease correlates strongly with cognitive symptoms, and weherever tau pathology appears in the brain, neuron death occurs. Spires-Jones discovered that in addition to accumulating within synapses, tau spreads trans-synaptically through neural circuits. As a postdoc, she characterized tau pathology and neurodegeneration in the rTg4510 mouse model of tauopathy, the first robust tau mouse model. As a junior faculty member at Harvard Medical School, Tara published a series of papers with Alix de Calignon who she co-supervised as a PhD student. In these studies, they found that tau aggregation in neurons counterintuitively protects cells from acute death and that tau pathology propagates through neural circuits in mice. In human brain, Tara's group recently observed tau in pre and post-synapses supporting potential tau spread through synapses in human disease. This paper won the Alzheimer's Association's 2024 Inge Grundke-Iqbal prize recognising the most impactful paper published over the previous two years. These data are important because stopping the spread of tau pathology through the brain has the potential to stop disease progression.

Spires-Jones' research has also shown that alpha-synuclein protein builds up in synapses in Dementia with Lewy Bodies, suggesting that these connections enable the protein to jump between cells, spreading damage through the brain and causing symptoms of dementia.

She has also made important discoveries linking two genetic risk factors for Alzheimer's disease, Apolipoprotein E4 and Clusterin to synaptic degeneration and has contributed to understanding of synapse degeneration in motorneurone disease, and schizophrenia.

== Personal life ==
As well as her academic career, Spires-Jones is also an avid SciFi fan and enjoys spending time with her family (including pets).
