= James Heartfield =

English writer (born 1961)

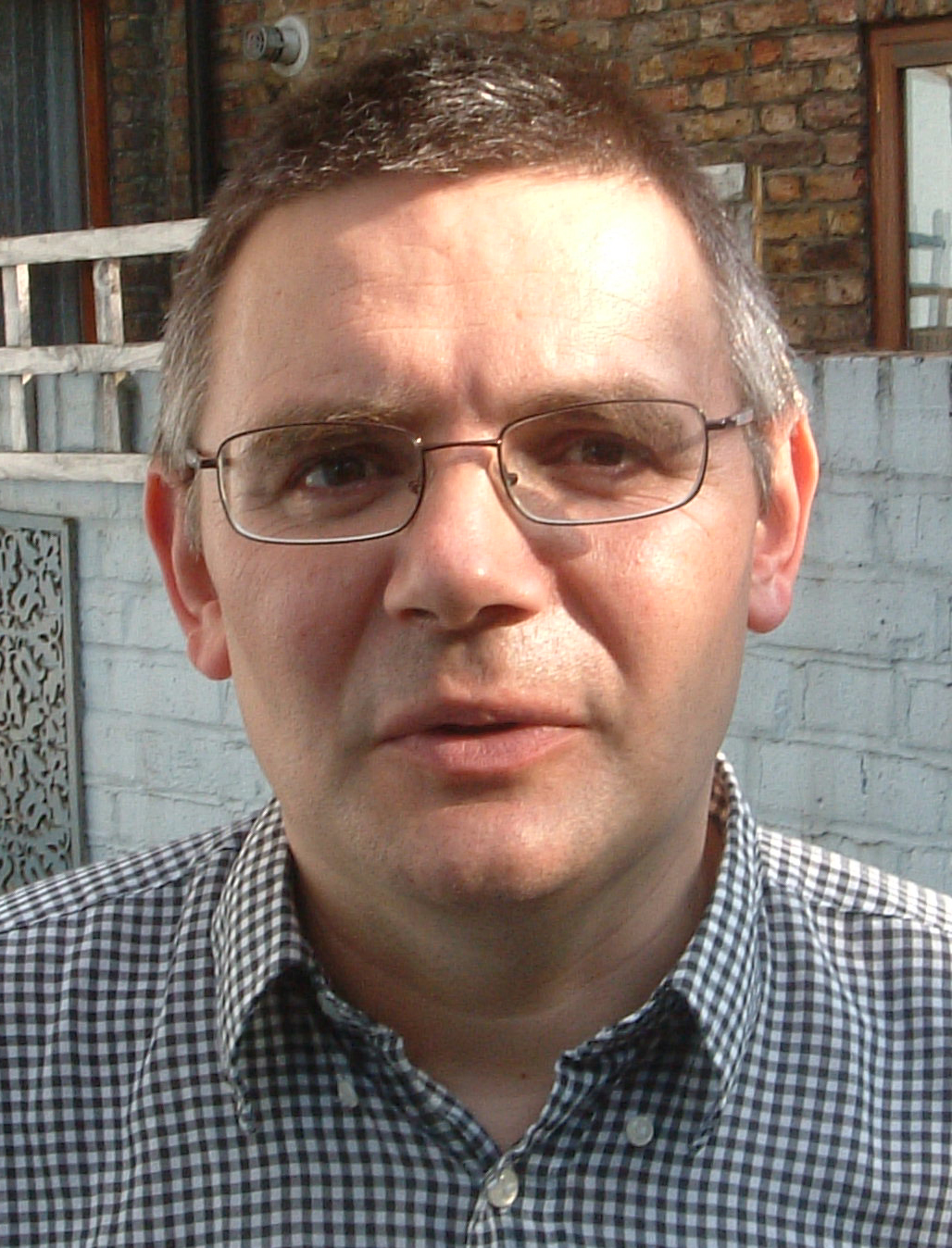
- Personal portrait of Heartfield, 2006
- Born: 1961 (age 64–65)
- Political party: Brexit Party
- Other political affiliations: Revolutionary Communist Party

James Heartfield (born 1961) is a British lecturer and historian.

== Life ==
Heartfield has written books on the history of the British Empire, including The British and Foreign Anti-Slavery Society (2016) and The Blood-Stained Poppy: A critique of the politics of commemoration (2019). Heartfield has written for ArtReview, Blueprint, Spiked Online, and the Times Education Supplement. His Ph.D. thesis, completed under the supervision of David Chandler at the University of Westminster in 2010, was published as The European Union and the End of Politics, in 2013.

In May 2006, with Julia Svetlichnaja, he interviewed the Russian dissident Alexander Litvinenko. Heartfield worked as a vaccinator during the COVID-19 pandemic.

== Politics ==
Heartfield is a former member of the Revolutionary Communist Party, and was previously a writer for their magazine Living Marxism. In 2002 he helped set up the Audacity campaign for more house-building. He has written in favour of Israel's right to independence. Heartfield stood as a candidate for the Brexit Party in the 2019 European Parliament election for Yorkshire and the Humber but did not gain a seat. Heartfield justified his standing as the Brexit Party being "the only serious party willing to champion the cause of democracy in the European elections" and stating that "The Brexit Party is not a racist party."

== Personal life ==
He lives in north London.

== Publications ==
- Hegel's Phenomenology of Spirit, (with Cronain O'Kelly) London, Archway Books, 2026
- Britain's Empires: A History, 1600–2020 London, Anthem Press, 2022
- The Blood-Stained Poppy: A critique of the politics of commemoration London, Zer0 Books, 2019
- The Equal Opportunities Revolution London, Repeater Books, 2017
- The British and Foreign Anti-Slavery Society London Hurst Books/Oxford University Press, 2016
- Who's Afraid of the Easter Rising? (with Kevin Rooney), London Zer0, Books, 2015
- The European Union and the End of Politics London, Zer0 Books, 2013
- British Workers & the US Civil War London, Reverspective, 2013
- Unpatriotic History of the Second World War London, Zer0 Books, 2012
- The Aborigines' Protection Society: Humanitarian Imperialism in Australia, New Zealand, Fiji, Canada, South Africa, and the Congo, 1836–1909 Hurst (London), and Columbia University Press (New York), 2011
- Green Capitalism: manufacturing scarcity in an age of abundance, Openmute, 2008
- Let's Build! Why we need Five Million Homes in the next 10 Years (Audacity, 2006)
- Escape the Creative Ghetto, with Chris Powell, NESTA, 2006
- Creativity Gap Blueprint, 2005
- The "Death of the Subject" Explained Sheffield Hallam University Press, 2002
- Great Expectations: the creative industries in the New Economy London, Design Agenda, 2000
- Need and Desire in the Post-material Economy Sheffield Hallam University Press, 1998
- Sustaining Architecture in the Anti-Machine Age co-editor with Ian Abley, London, John Wiley, 2002.
