= Mick Hume =

British journalist and author (born 1959)

- Born: 1959 (age 66–67); New Haw, Surrey, England
- Occupations: Journalist, author, columnist
- Known for: Founder of Spiked magazine

Mick Hume (born 1959) is a British journalist and author whose writing focuses on issues of free speech and freedom of the press.

Hume was a columnist for The Times for ten years from 1999, and was described as "Britain's only libertarian Marxist newspaper columnist".

Hume was born in New Haw, Surrey, and educated at Woking County Grammar School for Boys and the University of Manchester. In his twenties, Hume became editor of the next step, newspaper of the now-defunct Revolutionary Communist Party, of which Hume was a member for a decade until it folded.

After the RCP folded in 1996, Hume helped to relaunch the magazine as LM, which he edited until it was forced to close in 2000 after losing a libel suit brought by ITN, over claims that the magazine had made concerning ITN's reporting of Trnopolje camp in Bosnia.

In 2001, Hume was launch editor of the online magazine Spiked, the UK's first web-only comment and current affairs publication. In 2015, he became Spiked's editor-at-large.

Hume's book, There Is No Such Thing As a Free Press – and we need one more than ever was published in October 2012 in response to the Leveson Inquiry and the debate about press regulation in the UK. Daniel Finkelstein of The Times described it as "a masterclass in the writing of polemic".

Hume supports Manchester United, and for several years wrote a column in fanzine Red Issue entitled "View From The Smoke".

He is currently listed as Editor-in-Chief of The European Conservative magazine.

== Books ==
- Trigger Warning: Is the Fear of Being Offensive Killing Free Speech? (HarperCollins, 2015), ISBN 9780008126407
