= Red Issue =

British football fanzine

- Editor: 'Veg'
- Categories: Football fanzine
- Frequency: Monthly during football season
- First issue: February 1989
- Final issue Number: January 2015; 295
- Country: United Kingdom
- Based in: Manchester
- Language: English

Red Issue was a British fanzine aimed at Manchester United supporters. The fanzine was published monthly during the domestic football season since February 1989. The content of the fanzine was satirical, featuring jokes at the expense of Manchester United's own players in addition to their rival clubs.

== Launch ==
The fanzine was launched at the end of the 1980s. At the time of the launch, Alex Ferguson had failed to deliver any silverware as team manager and the club were still in a run that would eventually last 26 years without winning England's top division league title. Other United fanzines, Red News (the first United fanzine) and United We Stand, were launched during the same late 1980s era, and remain in circulation. Red Issue remained the best-selling matchday fanzine at Old Trafford stadium from its launch until its closure.

== Issue regulars ==
The fanzine contained several regular contributions, starting with the editorial comments inside the front cover reflecting on recent United performances and news.

Other regular features were:

- The Word on the Street (known as Backbeat from 1995 to 2005): Snippets of gossip regarding United, the club's players, transfer rumours and the like. Collected by 'Woodward and Bernstein' via emails from private sources amongst both mag readers and football insiders, and also from the Red Issue forum's Sanctuary section, it was not unusual for a story to appear here before any tabloid newspapers picked up on it.
- Life of Smiley: A play on the Lightning Seeds' track "The Life of Riley", a columnist's views on United, accompanied by happy or sad smiley faces depending on the subjects in question.
- Mr. Spleen: Another regular column, usually far more critical of Manchester United and the teams' players than the editorial or Smiley.
- Boylie: the views of Peter Boyle on all things related to Manchester United.
- View from the Smoke: A regular column written by British journalist Mick Hume.

The rest of the fanzine contained articles about past team exploits, contributions from readers and often comic strips which poked fun at United's rivals such as Manchester City ("Bertie Magoo - The Bitter Blue") and Liverpool ("Sticky Fingers")

== Campaigns ==
Proclaiming to be the "Voice of the fans", Red Issue tried to influence fan campaigns throughout its history - with notable contributions in the defeat of an attempted takeover of the club by Rupert Murdoch's BSkyB and attempts to block the Glazer takeover.

Green & Gold - Till They Die Or Fold/Till the club is sold was a campaign by some of the Red Issue faithful led by forum leader Chatmaster.

After Manchester United claimed an historic 19th league title, the Red Issue fanzine was behind the unveiling of a banner at arch-rivals Liverpool's home stadium Anfield, taunting opposition fans with their league titles record having been toppled.

== Website ==
The Red Issue website ran in conjunction with the fanzine, containing links to the online forum. The website carried the same satirical tone to the fanzine itself, and advertised it on many pages. The online news bulletins from the Red Issue management stopped on 1 December 2007. The paywalled website continued after the closure of the fanzine, under the sole direction of the fanzine's final editor, who also controlled the Red Issue Twitter account, which made its final post on 31 July 2021.
