= Fikret Alić =

Bosnian survivor

Fikret Alić is a Bosniak survivor of the 1992 Keraterm and Trnopolje concentration camps near the city of Prijedor in northwest Bosnia and Herzegovina. The journalist Ed Vulliamy, whose reporting of Trnopolje and another concentration camp at Omarska helped draw public attention to the atrocities being perpetrated in the Prijedor camp system, described Alić as being "probably the most familiar figure in the world" in the summer of 1992, when the image of his emaciated frame, seen behind barbed wire at the Trnopolje concentration camp, was seen around the world as emblematic of the violence being inflicted on non-Serb civilians by Bosnian Serbs under the leadership of Radovan Karadžić during the Bosnian War and genocide.

== Press visit to Omarska and Trnopolje ==
In the summer of 1992, in response to media interest roused by rumours about atrocities being committed by Bosnian Serb forces in ad hoc prison camps, the Bosnian Serb leader Radovan Karadžić invited journalists including Roy Gutman, a British film crew from ITN, and The Guardian’s Ed Vulliamy to visit the camps. Local Serb officials sought to block their access to the camps but eventually took Penny Marshall, Ian Williams and Ed Vulliamy to Omarska, where they were allowed to speak to prisoners in the canteen under very constrained circumstances. They were stopped at gunpoint by the camp commander from visiting the areas of the camp where most of the prisoners were being held.

After leaving Omarska they drove past another camp, Trnopolje, where they found more shocking scenes. The journalists, accompanied by camp guards and a Serbian television crew, interviewed staff and inmates. Fikret Alić was among a group of very recently arrived prisoners from the Keraterm camp being held in a corner of the camp, which was also a transit camp for the removal of the non-Serb population from the local Kozarac and Prijedor area.

The footage from Omarska and Trnopolje was broadcast by ITN on 6 August 1992. The image of Fikret Alić, his emaciated condition highlighted by his gaunt face and protruding ribs and his prisoner status emphasised by a prominent strand of barbed wire, was prominently featured. The reporters' confirmation of the camps' existence and the suffering of inmates fuelled public outrage about the war in Bosnia-Herzegovina. Alić's image became iconic of the suffering of civilians and prisoners.

In a rare emotive address, former British Prime Minister Margaret Thatcher criticized her successor John Major's inaction, beginning with the words "I never thought I’d see another holocaust in my life."

The Report submitted to the United Nations Security Council by the Bassiouni Commission, the Commission of Experts investigating the reports of atrocities in Bosnia, identified Trnopolje as a concentration camp functioning as a staging area for mass deportations mainly of women, children, and elderly men and described the Omarska and Keraterm camps to which the adult non-Serb men were taken as death camps.

The regime at Trnopolje was far better than in Omarska and Keraterm but "none the less harassment and malnutrition was a problem for all the inmates. Rapes, beatings and other kinds of torture and even killings were not rare." Although the Commission considered that Trnopolje was not a death camp like Omarska or Keraterm, it observed that "the label «concentration camp» is nonetheless justified for Logor Trnopolje due to the regime prevailing in the camp." (The Report used the Bosnian word "logor" specifically to distinguish the Prijedor camps from the wide range of institutions encompassed by the English term "camp" and emphasise the inhumane nature of the camp regimes.)

== LM controversy ==
The journalists' reports were used as evidence in war crimes tribunals in The Hague. But the picture also sparked controversy; five years after its original publication, the magazine LM (formerly Living Marxism) published an article entitled 'The Picture that Fooled the World', claiming that the reporting had been misconstrued to give a misleading impression of the camp as a concentration camp run by Serbs for Bosniaks and Croats rather than just a collection centre for refugees. It was alleged that Alić's emaciated condition was the result of a childhood bout of tuberculosis. Ed Vulliamy retorted that those who had died in Trnopolje and Omarska camps were those 'most horribly insulted' by the LM suggestions. Alić denied LM allegations and testified against his tormentors in a libel action in the UK High Court brought by ITN against LM. Following dramatic evidence given by the camp doctor Idriz Merdžanić the jury found against LM and awarded substantial damages to ITN and the journalists.

Alić subsequently described to the Bosnian television programme 60 minuta how his condition was brought about by the internal injuries he suffered in the brutal treatment he experienced in the death camp at Keraterm. He also described how he had had to be smuggled out of the camp disguised as a woman.
