= Moral Crusades in an Age of Mistrust =

2013 book by Frank Furedi

Moral Crusades in an Age of Mistrust: The Jimmy Savile Scandal
- Author: Frank Furedi
- Publisher: Palgrave Macmillan
- Publication date: 2013
- Pages: 118
- ISBN: 978-1-137-33801-3

Moral Crusades in an Age of Mistrust: The Jimmy Savile Scandal is a 2013 sociology book written by University of Kent professor Frank Furedi. The book analyses the Jimmy Savile sexual abuse scandal, its effects on British culture and society, and the concept of moral crusades, which he distinguishes from moral panics.
