= Red News =

Manchester United fan magazine

Red News is the first Manchester United unofficial supporters' fanzine, founded in 1987. It is available in printed format, and on the internet with daily news on the football club Manchester United. It is run by matchgoing Manchester United supporters for United fans at games and all around the world.

The fanzine also runs the popular ‘Red News Bus’, or ‘Red Bus’ as it is known by its regular passengers. A former driver, Ernie, was at the ‘White Horse’ FA Cup Final in 1929.

Over the years there have been a number of fanzines sold outside Old Trafford. In 2015, Red Issue (which two former Red News contributors left to set up) was sold outside Old Trafford for the last time.

The two remaining fanzines, Red News and United We Stand are still going strong, both with a different theme and format. Red News aims to provide a laugh, but also mixing serious theme and content from a number of regular or irregular - or one off - contributors.

Red News celebrated its 25th anniversary in 2012, one of the few remaining fanzines - a handful - that were created in the '80s boom. Red News has interviewed over 50 current and former United players, with one of its highlights being an interview with Eric Cantona. United manager Alex Ferguson has twice been interviewed, most recently during the 2008–09 season to commemorate Red News' 150th printed edition.

In 2015, Red News will reach the milestone of being sold at 900 Manchester United games since it was first published in 1987

Red News' website is a more recent extension of the fanzine, providing Internet discussion forums and additional United news.

In 2008, Red News was short listed for the Fanzine of the Year 2008.

In 2009, Red News was shortlisted for Fanzine of the Year 2009 and in the following categories. “Best Premier League - Print” “Best Premier League - Online” “Best Editor - Either Media” and writers Bunter1969, Barney, Tom Clare, Tony Smith and Pete Shaw for “Best Writer - Either Media”
