= Fiona Fox =

British writer

Fiona Fox OBE HonFRS
- Born: 12 November 1964 (age 61); Mancot, Wales
- Education: Polytechnic of Central London
- Occupations: Journalist; Press secretary Public relations
- Employer(s): Science Media Centre; Previously: NCOPF; Equal Opportunities Commission; CAFOD; Thames Polytechnic
- Known for: Science Media Centre
- Spouse: Kevin Rooney
- Relatives: Claire Fox (sister)
- Awards: OBE
- Website: www.theguardian.com/profile/fox-fiona

Fiona Bernadette Fox (born 12 November 1964) is a British writer and chief executive of the Science Media Centre.

== Career ==
Fox was a writer for Living Marxism, a British magazine produced by the Revolutionary Communist Party (RCP). In 1995, LM published an article by Fox denying the Rwandan genocide.

Fox became head of media at CAFOD in 1995.

In December 2001 Fox was appointed the founding director of the Science Media Centre, based at the Royal Institution of Great Britain in London and its current chief executive.

In that capacity she has been a regular media commentator and gave evidence at the Leveson Inquiry into press standards in the UK in 2012.

== Awards ==
Fox was appointed Officer of the Order of the British Empire (OBE) in the 2013 Birthday Honours for services to science. She was elected an Honorary Fellow of the Royal Society in 2023.

== Personal life ==
Fox was born into an Irish Catholic family in Mancot, near Hawarden, North Wales. She has two older sisters, one of whom is Claire Fox. She is a supporter of Celtic F.C. and is married to political commentator and teacher Kevin Rooney. She was formerly a member of the Revolutionary Communist Party.

== Published works ==
— (2022). Beyond the Hype. London: Elliott and Thompson Limited. ISBN 978-1-78396-617-2. OCLC 1274201845.
