= Frank Furedi =

Hungarian-Canadian sociologist (born 1947)

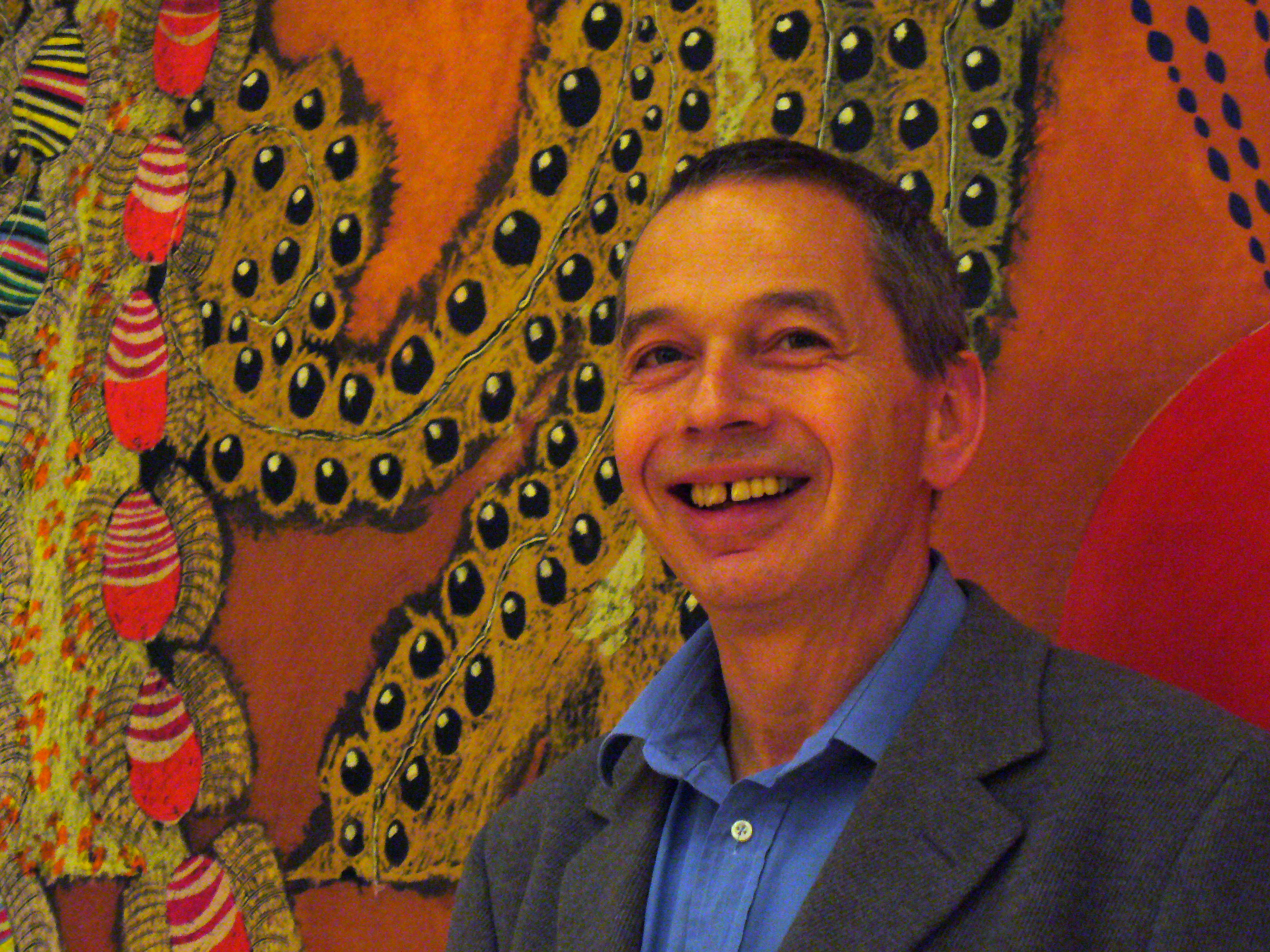
- Furedi in 2007
- Born: Füredi Ferenc; 3 May 1947 (age 79); Budapest, Hungary
- Other name: Frank Richards
- Political party: International Socialists (before 1973); Revolutionary Communist Group (1973–1976); Revolutionary Communist Party (1978–1997)
- Spouse: Ann Furedi (m. 1982)

Academic background
- Education: McGill University (BA); SOAS University of London (MA); University of Kent (PhD)
- Thesis: The Mau Mau Revolt in Perspective: The Betrayal of a Dream (1987)

Academic work
- Discipline: Sociology
- Institutions: University of Kent
- Notable students: Munira Mirza, political advisor who served as Director of the Number 10 Policy Unit under Prime Minister Boris Johnson
- Website: frankfuredi.com

Frank Furedi (Hungarian: Füredi Ferenc; born 3 May 1947) is a Hungarian-Canadian academic and emeritus professor of sociology at the University of Kent. He has studied the sociology of fear, education, therapy culture, sociology of knowledge, and what he calls "paranoid parenting".

== Early life and education ==
Furedi's family emigrated from Hungary to Canada after the failed 1956 uprising, and he completed a bachelor's degree in international relations at McGill University. He has lived in Britain since 1969. He completed an MA in African politics at the School of Oriental and African Studies, and received a PhD from the University of Kent in 1987 with a thesis on the Mau Mau Uprising in Kenya.

== Revolutionary Communist Party and offshoots ==
A former student radical, he became involved in left wing politics in Britain in the 1970s, in particular, as a member of the International Socialists (IS), under the pseudonym Frank Richards. He and others were expelled from the IS in 1973 and formed the Revolutionary Communist Group, then in 1976, he and his followers were expelled from this group and formed the Revolutionary Communist Tendency, refounded in 1978 as the Trotskyist Revolutionary Communist Party, a militant faction that asserted that a purer vanguard party was needed, focusing on international solidarity and propaganda rather than trade unionism.

The RCP was distinguished by its contrarianism, commitment to theoretical elaboration and hostility to state intervention in social life. Key positions for the party were involvement in anti-imperialist politics, including removal of British troops in Northern Ireland, support for IRA and Saddam Husseinand opposition to the Gulf War.

In December 1990, the RCP's magazine Living Marxism ran an article by Furedi, entitled "Midnight in the Century", which argued that the corrosive effect of the collapse of both Stalinism and reformism on the working class meant that "for the time being at least, the working class has no political existence". This signalled a re-orientation of the party towards more libertarian positions, its formal dissolution by the end of the decade, and the founding of the right wing website Spiked Online with which Furedi is now associated.

== Academic career ==
Furedi's academic work was initially devoted to a study of imperialism and race relations. His books on the subject include The Mau Mau War in Perspective, The New Ideology of Imperialism and The Silent War: Imperialism and the Changing Perception of Race. In recent years his work has been oriented towards exploring the sociology of risk and low expectations. Furedi is author of several books on this topic, most recently Wasted: Why Education Isn't Educating (Continuum 2009) and Invitation to Terror: The Expanding Empire of the Unknown (Continuum 2007), an analysis of the impact of terrorism post 9/11. His more recent publications, On Tolerance: A Defence of Moral Independence (Continuum 2011) and Authority: A Sociological Introduction (Cambridge University Press) deal with the inter-related problem of freedom and authority.

He was, according to research from 2005, the most widely cited sociologist in the UK press. Furedi frequently appears in the media, expressing his view that Western societies have become obsessed with risk. He writes regularly for Spiked. He has also written several books on the subject of risk, offering a counterpoint to the analyses of Anthony Giddens and Ulrich Beck, including Paranoid Parenting, Therapy Culture, and Culture of Fear.

Notable PhD students he has supervised include Munira Mirza, political advisor who served as Director of the Number 10 Policy Unit under Prime Minister Boris Johnson, Leader of the Conservative Party from 2019 to 2022, Foreign Secretary from 2016 to 2018 and Mayor of London from 2008 to 2016.

In November 2021, Furedi assumed the post of director of the MCC Brussels centre, an offshoot of the Mathias Corvinus Collegium funded by the ruling Hungarian Fidesz party, citing the need for an alternative to mainstream pro-European think-tanks.

In May 2023, Furedi spoke at the National Conservatism Conference in London on the topic "The War Against National Belonging".

== Views ==
In the 1990s he was actively involved in campaigns for free speech. Furedi maintains that society and universities are undergoing a politically driven 'dumbing down' process which is manifest in society's growing inability to understand and assess the meaning of risk. The rise of the environmental and green movements parallels society's growing obsession with risk. Furedi also attacks the scientific consensus on global warming, and has criticised the prominent role played by science in policy formation.

In 2008 he criticised opponents of American vice presidential candidate Sarah Palin on the Spiked website. He claims: "It seems that even fervent advocates of women's rights will adopt outdated and chauvinistic moral rhetoric when targeting a woman they do not like."

In 2008 he co-authored a book with Jennie Bristow published by the think tank Civitas titled Licensed to Hug: How Child Protection Policies Are Poisoning the Relationship Between the Generations and Damaging the Voluntary Sector, arguing that the growth of police vetting (see Criminal Records Bureau) has created a sense of mistrust and advocating a more common-sense approach to adult/child relations, based on the assumption that the vast majority of adults can be relied on to help and support children, and that the healthy interaction between generations enriches children's lives.

== Reception ==
=== Praise ===
The philosopher Mary Warnock wrote in 2011 that Furedi is "to be respected in the strongest sense, indeed greatly admired" for his exposure of hypocrisy and intolerance in contemporary culture.

In reviewing Furedi's Where Have All the Intellectuals Gone? for The Times in 2004, the traditional conservative philosopher and writer Roger Scruton said:

For Furedi the growing contempt for objective truth and transmissible knowledge is the sign of a deeper malaise within society – a loss of trust in rational thought and a flight towards "social inclusion", where this means, in effect, mob rule. The philistinism of educational theory, the take-over of the humanities by the "postmodern" charlatans, the loss of respect for science, and the growing tendency to put "relevance" at the heart of the curriculum – all these are signs, for Furedi, of a fundamental repudiation of knowledge. And this explains the vanishing of the intellectuals.

=== Criticism ===
Left and progressive critics of Furedi maintain that the organizations he has supported are cultish and reactionary. Blogger Benjamin Doxtdator has described Furedi's views on race as a "colourblind racism." George Monbiot has accused Furedi of overseeing extreme right-wing libertarian campaigns "against gun control, against banning tobacco advertising and child pornography, and in favour of global warming, human cloning and freedom for corporations". Monbiot has also accused him of leading entryism of ex-RCPers into "key roles in the formal infrastructure of public communication used by the science and medical establishment", to pursue an agenda in favour of genetic engineering. The journalist Nick Cohen has described the RCP as a "weird cult" whose Leninist discipline, disruptive behaviour and selfish publicity-seeking have remained unaltered during the various tactical shifts in the face it presents to the wider world.

== Personal life ==
Furedi is married to Ann Furedi. He lives in Faversham, Kent. Their son Jacob edits online publication Dispatch.

== Bibliography ==
- The Soviet Union Demystified: A Materialist Analysis, Junius Publications, 1986, ISBN 0948392037
- The Mau Mau War in Perspective, James Currey Publishers, 1989
- Mythical Past, Elusive Future: History and Society in an Anxious Age, Pluto Press, 1991
- The New Ideology of Imperialism: Renewing the Moral Imperative, Pluto Press, 1994
- Colonial Wars and the Politics of Third World Nationalism, IB Tauris, 1994
- Culture of Fear: Risk Taking and the Morality of Low Expectation, Continuum International Publishing Group, 1997, ISBN 030433751X. 2nd edition: 2002, ISBN 0826459293
- Population and Development: A Critical Introduction, Palgrave Macmillan, 1997
- The Silent War: Imperialism and the Changing Perception of Race, Pluto Press, 1998
- Courting Mistrust: The Hidden Growth of a Culture of Litigation in Britain, Centre for Policy Studies, 1999
- Paranoid Parenting: Abandon Your Anxieties and Be a Good Parent, Allen Lane, 2001
- Therapy Culture: Cultivating Vulnerability in an Uncertain Age, Routledge, 2003
- Where Have All the Intellectuals Gone?: Confronting Twenty-First Century Philistinism, Continuum International Publishing Group, 2004
- The Politics of Fear. Beyond Left and Right, Continuum International Publishing Group, 2005, ISBN 0826487289
- Invitation to Terror: The Expanding Empire of the Unknown, Continuum International Publishing Group, 2007, ISBN 0826499570
- Licensed to Hug: How Child Protection Policies Are Poisoning the Relationship Between the Generations and Damaging the Voluntary Sector with Jennie Bristow, Civitas, 2008, ISBN 1903386705. 2nd Revised edition: 2010, ISBN 1906837163, 978-1-903386-70-5
- Wasted: Why Education Isn't Educating, Continuum International Publishing Group, 2009
- On Tolerance: The Life Style Wars: A Defence of Moral Independence, Continuum International Publishing Group, 2011, ISBN 1441120106
- Authority: A Sociological Introduction, Cambridge University Press, 2013
- Moral Crusades in an Age of Mistrust: The Jimmy Savile Scandal, Palgrave Macmillan, 2013, ISBN 1137338016
- First World War: Still No End in Sight, Bloomsbury USA, 2014, ISBN 1441125108
- Power of Reading: From Socrates to Twitter, Bloomsbury, 2015, ISBN 1472914775
- Populism and the European Culture Wars: The Conflict of Values between Hungary and the EU, Routledge, 2017, ISBN 1138097438
- How Fear Works: Culture of Fear in the Twenty-First Century, Bloomsbury, 2018, ISBN 9781472972897
- Why Borders Matter: Why Humanity Must Relearn the Art of Drawing Boundaries, Routledge, 2020, ISBN 0367416824
- 100 Years of Identity Crisis: Culture War Over Socialisation, de Gruyter, 2021, ISBN 9783110708936
- The War Against the Past: Why The West Must Fight For Its History., Polity Press, 2024 ISBN 9781509561254
