= Revolutionary Communist Party (UK, 1977) =

British political organisation (1977–1997)

- Leader: Frank Furedi; Michael Fitzpatrick; Mick Hume
- Founded: Revolutionary Communist Tendency (1977); Revolutionary Communist Party (1981)
- Dissolved: 1996
- Split from: Revolutionary Communist Group
- Newspaper: The Next Step; Living Marxism
- Membership: 380 (1995) (Note: The RCP additionally claimed to have had "round 1,100–1,200 close contacts")
- Ideology: 1977–1991: Communism; Trotskyism; 1991–1996: Libertarianism
- Political position: 1977–1991: Far-left; 1991–1996: Syncretic
- Colors: Red

The Revolutionary Communist Party (RCP), called the Revolutionary Communist Tendency (RCT) until 1981, was a British political organisation that existed from 1977 to 1996. It was nominally a Trotskyist communist party until 1991, when it abandoned Trotskyism and publicly switched to a libertarian position. It began with only a few dozen supporters and grew to a peak membership of 200 in the early 1990s. RCP was distinguished by its contrarianism; among its positions were support for IRA and Saddam Hussein.

From 1988 it published the journal Living Marxism, whose writers were criticised for denying the Rwandan and Bosnian genocides.

== History ==
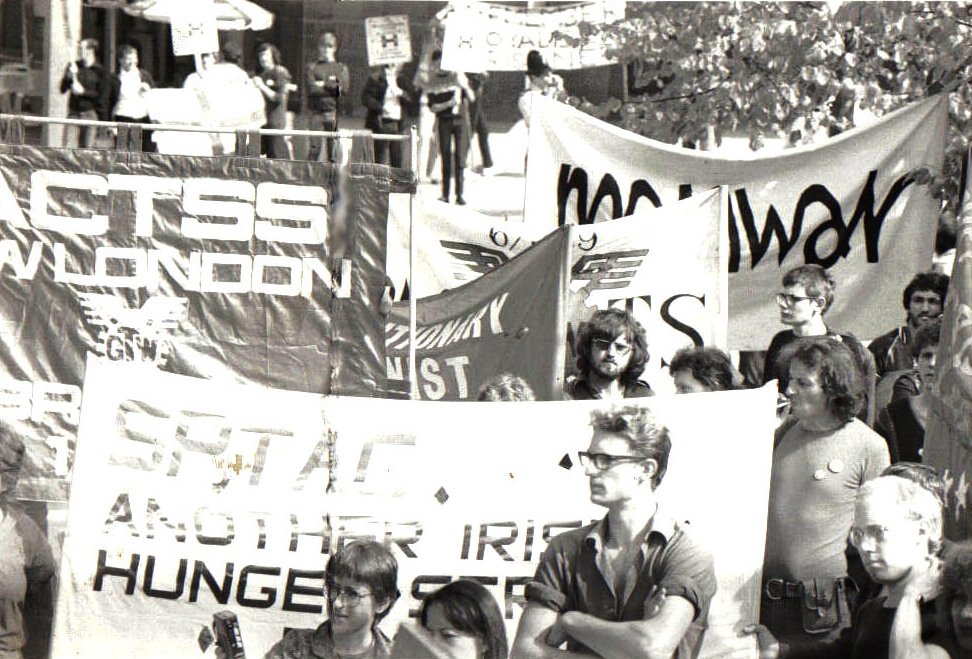
The "Workers March for Irish Freedom", taking the cause of Irish hunger strikers to the Trades Union Congress conference in 1981, was a turning point for the party

The party originated as a tendency within the Revolutionary Communist Group. The RCG had been formed in March 1974 after members of the International Socialists were expelled the previous year, including Frank Furedi.

This group had concluded that there was no living Marxist tradition in the left due to them not building upon the developments of Marxism since the Second World War, so therefore a revolutionary program would have to be developed to win over the working class. They saw the British working class and especially the labour movement as dominated by bourgeois ideology and chauvinist nationalism, and the IS as pandering to its low-level trade union consciousness and economism; they asserted that a purer vanguard party was needed, focusing on international solidarity and propaganda rather than trade unionism.

In November 1976, a group of individuals led by Furedi were expelled from the RCG due to disagreements relating to the Anti-Apartheid Movement and the Communist Party of Great Britain. The RCT wanted to be able to criticise the African National Congress, which led to their expulsion. This group founded the Revolutionary Communist Tendency in 1977.

The Revolutionary Communist Tendency (RCT) hoped to draw together those militant working class leaders who were disappointed by the limitations of reformism to help to build a new working class leadership and develop an independent working class programme.

The RCT was officially formed as the Revolutionary Communist Party in May 1981. The method of growth adopted by the RCP was for members to move to other places in order to set up branches, seen as different to other parties emerging from a merging of far-left factions or from calls made by the labour movement.

== Organisation ==
The RCP operated using front organisations which revolved around single issues and were set up to combat leftism chauvinism. These front organisations were also created for the purposes of recruiting people.

=== Workers Against Racism ===
Beginning as East London Workers Against Racism (ELWAR) before it was launched as a national campaign, Workers Against Racism campaigned against state racism. Protests were organised against deportations and passport checks at hospitals and unemployment benefit offices. ELWAR also organised patrols and vigils to defend immigrants against racist attacks, however their organisation was not large enough to use these tactics effectively. In Parliament, Conservative MP Nicholas Winterton demanded of the Home Secretary "if he will seek to proscribe the East London Workers against Racism vigilante group". Workers Against Racism was criticised in the press for its activities during the 1981 Brixton riots. An internal Home Office report to then Prime Minister Margaret Thatcher claimed:

[T]he Revolutionary Communist Party set up a Lambeth Unemployed Workers' Group shortly before the Riots, and has since formed a South London Workers Against Racism group, similar to the East London Workers Against Racism which attracted some notoriety for organising vigilante patrols.

=== Anti-deportation campaigns ===
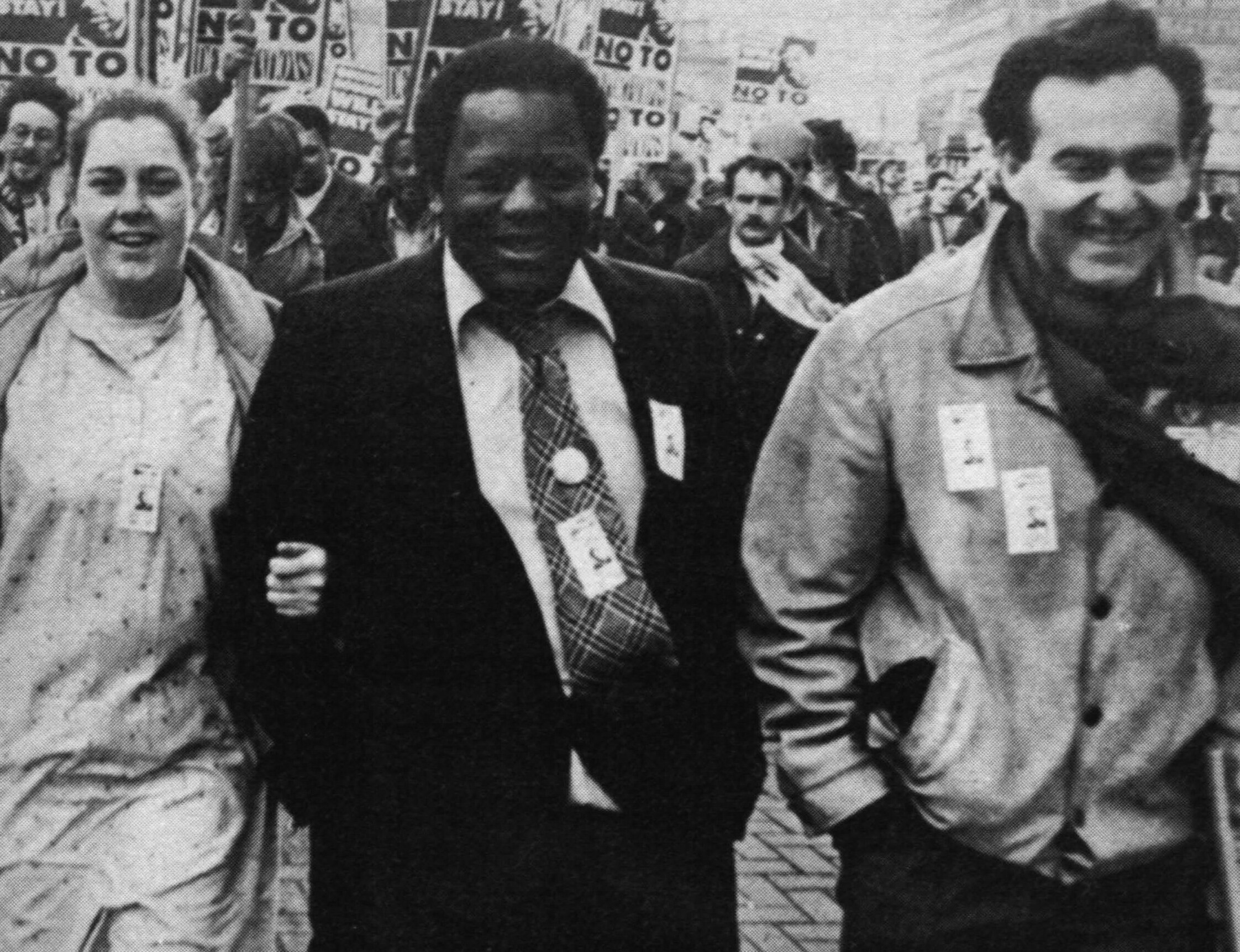
George Roucou, marching to freedom, with his wife Kay and Workers Against Racism organiser Charles Longford

The party's Workers Against Racism campaign fought many deportation threats, like George Roucou's, on the grounds that British immigration law was racist. Roucou was a shop steward in the building workers' union UCATT in Manchester. Workers Against Racism helped to organise a campaign culminating in a one-day strike and demonstration by his fellow council workers on 6 February 1987. On 13 March 1987, with 500 protesting outside, the Home Office appeal panel reversed Roucou's deportation order. On 11 June 1985, Metso Moncrieffe was arrested and held by police pending a deportation order. Workers Against Racism campaigners raised the case, disrupting a test match at the Edgbaston cricket ground in July 1985 with a Metso Must Stay banner and helping to build a 1,000-strong march for him in December 1986. In September 1987, Moncrieffe's deportation order was overturned.

=== Supporting Irish republicanism ===
Supporting Irish republicanism was central to the work of the party. According to historian Jack Hepworth, "Advocating ‘unconditional support’ enabled the RCP to challenge reformism on the British left and nationalism in the labour movement."

In 1978, the RCP organised the Smash the Prevention of Terrorism Act Campaign and held protests outside police stations where suspects were held. The party organised a conference of trade unionists opposed to Northern Ireland being part of the United Kingdom in Coventry in 1981 and later that year held a march to the TUC conference, the Workers March for Irish Freedom. On Saturday 6 February 1982, the Irish Freedom Movement (IFM) was founded at a meeting in Caxton House, Archway and TUC general secretary Len Murray wrote to the thirteen trades councils that sponsored the conference threatening them with disaffiliation if they attended. RCP Political Committee member Mick Hume, who edited The Next Step, recalls that the IFM were accused of complicity and involvement in the 1984 bombing of the Conservative Party conference by the media. The IFM had protested the conference on the previous day, along with an event organised by the Monday Club.

The IFM published a quarterly bulletin Irish Freedom and organised an annual march on the anniversary of internment. When the voices of Sinn Féin supporters were banned from the British broadcast media, Living Marxism carried a front page interview with its leader Gerry Adams and the IFM picketed Broadcasting House. After the Brighton bombing, an RCP editorial in the next step said:

We support unconditionally the right of the Irish people to carry out their struggle for national liberation in whatever way they choose. We neither support nor condemn any particular tactic the republican movement pursues, whether it is an electoral campaign or a bombing campaign.

Similarly, after the Enniskillen bombing in 1987, Hume reiterated that British radicals’ responses could "not be based on emotional revulsion at particular incidents of violence or terror".

By the end of the 1980s, according to historian Jack Hepworth, "the IFM was the largest radical solidarity movement in Britain, with an annual August march in London typically attracting an estimated 3,000 demonstrators" and an activist base beyond the party faithful; by 1990 it had twenty branches in the UK.

=== Student politics ===
The party primarily recruited amongst students. By 1984, it had 45 university and polytechnic branches.

=== Electoral involvement ===
The RCP stood candidates in the May 1981 local elections, under its own name and that of ELWAR. It stood a candidate in the 1983 Bermondsey by-election, its campaign mainly consisting of heckling Labour candidate Peter Tatchell, who lost the seat to the Liberal Party; the RCP candidate received 38 votes. It fielded four candidates in the 1983 United Kingdom general election, who achieved a total vote of nearly 1000. In 1983, the party began its annual "Preparing for Power" public conferences. In 1986, it launched a new theoretical journal, Confrontation. In the 1986 United Kingdom local elections, the RCP stood 38 candidates, including Claire Fox (under the name Claire Foster), who received a total of just under 2300 votes, with an average of 60 votes each. In the 1986 Knowsley North by-election, its candidate was also backed by the Workers Revolutionary Party and received 664 votes, its highest so far. In the 1987 Greenwich by-election, its candidate received 91 votes.

In 1987, it launched the Red Front electoral coalition, appealing to other anti-Labour groups to join it. Its manifesto demanded work or full pay, the defence of trade union rights, equal rights for all, and opposition to war. It had a libertarian flavour and also argued that "The dangers from Aids have in fact been grossly exaggerated. The principal threat to homosexuals in Britain today is not from Aids, but from the safe sex campaign." Two other groups joined the campaign: Red Action and the Revolutionary Democratic Group. The Front stood 14 candidates, including Kenan Malik. The candidate in Knowsley North achieved 538 vote (1.37%); the others between 111 and 300. It stood its own candidates in the 1989 Glasgow Central by-election and 1989 Vauxhall by-election, receiving 141 and 171 votes respectively.

=== Campaign Against Militarism ===
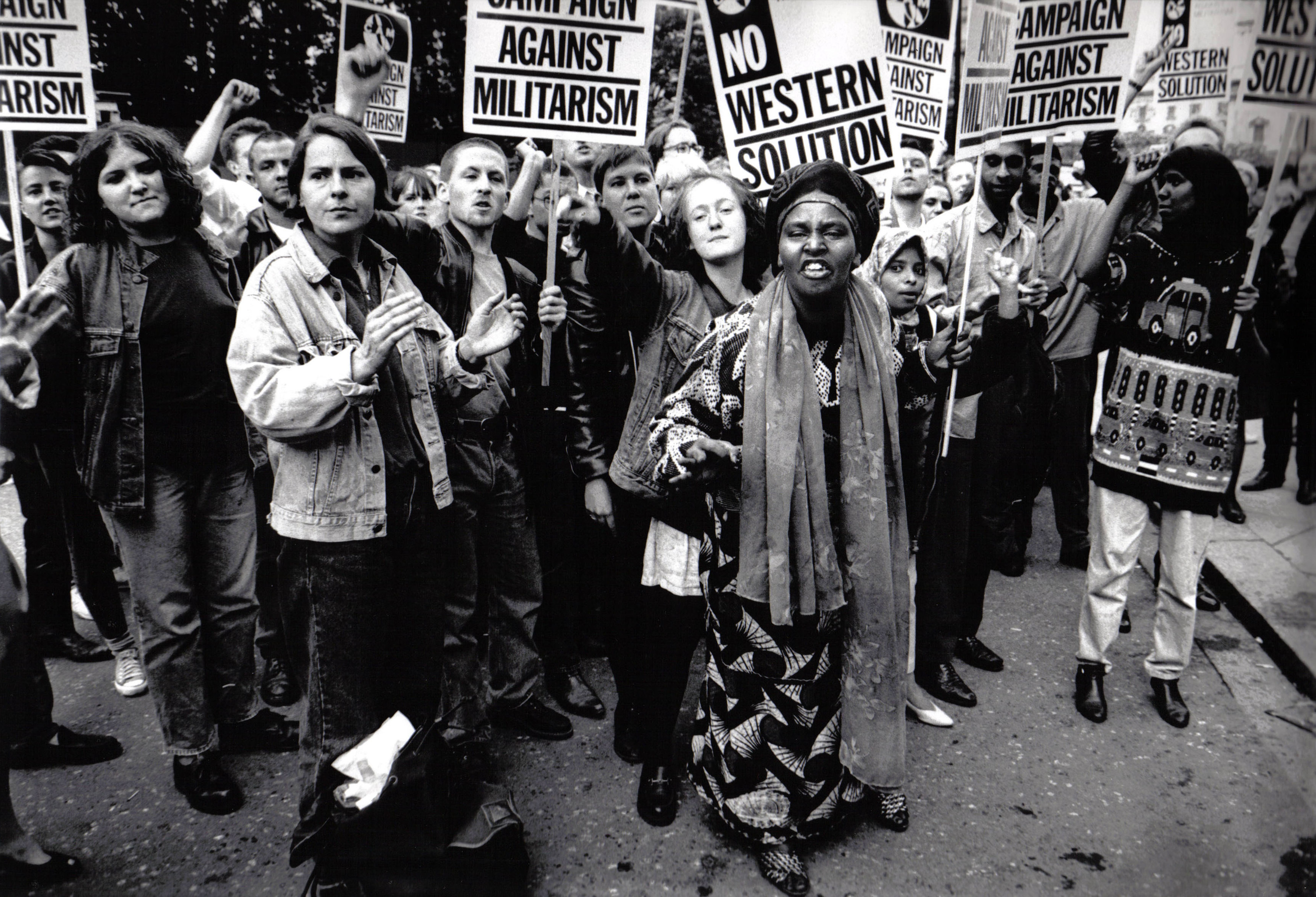
Campaign Against Militarism protest in 1994

In 1993, the party helped launch the Campaign Against Militarism (CAM) to fight against western military intervention. CAM organised protests against the military interventions in Somalia, Bosnia and Iraq. On 10 September 1993, seventy Somalis and CAM supporters occupied the United States embassy after an alleged massacre of civilians in Mogadishu, the only time it has happened. After they were evicted by armed marines, eleven were convicted under the as yet untested criminal trespass laws, but charges were dropped after lawyer Mike Fisher sought to have the case tried in the United States, arguing that the offence, if any, was committed on American soil. CAM was the only left-wing group that joined British Serbs in their demonstrations over the military strikes on Yugoslavia in 1994.

In The Empire Strikes Back, Mike Freeman identified "the metamorphosis of what had long regarded itself as a peace movement into a war movement" after Labour rallied to support the First Iraq War. Later, this trend was called "humanitarian imperialism" in Living Marxism. The party opposed Western military intervention in Bosnia, Somalia, Kosovo, Iraq and East Timor.

== Ideology ==
Taking a line inspired by Vladimir Lenin's work on the relationship between imperialism and reformism, the party originally held that: "the only hope of securing any decent sort of life – or even guaranteeing survival – lies in the working class taking control over society and establishing a system of planned production."

It further argued that traditional Stalinist and social democratic appeals to the bourgeois state had undermined working-class independence and that as a result an independent vanguard party should be organized to campaign for a distinctly working-class politics. In 1978, for example, when the left was strong within the Labour Party, the RCP argued that "Labour is the party which attempts to resolve the crisis by integrating militant working class resistance into the capitalist system". This position included a rejection of support for the Labour Party and one that questioned the allegiances of the trade union movement. A consequence of this belief was a growing distrust of traditional statist left-wing struggles as reformist. According to some, the RCP took a view that reformism consolidated bourgeois ideology in the potential leadership layers of the working class. The RCP took a number of positions coined to distinguish independent working-class politics from statist reformism which included:

- The rejection of all controls on immigration.
- Opposition to any national economic recovery strategies, such as import controls, which aimed to pit British workers against those overseas.
- Free abortion and contraception on demand.
- Decriminalisation of homosexuality and complete equality under the law.
- Unconditional support for the struggle against British imperialism in Northern Ireland on the grounds that "British workers cannot ignore the cause of Irish liberation without renouncing their own class interests".
- A claim that the police occupied Brixton: "We have to organise on the streets and housing estates to keep the police out".
- Opposition to no platforming fascists, but, through the campaign Workers Against Racism, aiming to organise physical defence against racist attacks.

The party's programme can be traced through the publications "Our Tasks and Methods" (a reprint of the Revolutionary Communist Group's founding document), the 1983 general election manifesto Preparing for Power and the article "The Road to Power" in the theoretical journal Confrontation (1986).

=== Controversial positions ===
The party took a number of positions that were strongly criticised by others on the left:

- In The Truth About the AIDS Panic, Michael Fitzpatrick and Don Milligan wrote that there is "no good evidence that Aids is likely to spread rapidly among heterosexuals in the West". The pamphlet argued that the government campaign warning of a heterosexual aids epidemic was a moral panic that would worsen prejudice against gay people.
- When British miners struck against redundancies in 1984, the party argued that the union's refusal to hold a national ballot was a major problem: "The only way to win the passive majority for the strike was to launch an aggressive campaign around a national ballot". This led to major criticism of the RCP from other left groups.
- In the struggle against Apartheid in South Africa, the party argued that "sanctions don't make sense" because it was wrong to call on the governments that had supported Apartheid to overthrow it. Rather, workers ought to "take direct action", like blocking South African imports at docks.

When the organisation re-thought its outlook in 1991, it adopted a number of positions that put it at odds with the New Labour milieu:

- Living Marxism argued against what it called the "new authoritarianism", the greater official interference and surveillance of ordinary people by the state. The growth in "at-risk" registers and CCTV were examples.
- The party opposed the increase in judicial and other kinds of non-majoritarian overriding of parliament as well as the subordination of parliament to the European Convention on Human Rights.

== Criticism ==
In 1981, Alex Callinicos of the British Socialist Workers Party (SWP) took issue with the party's argument that "such issues as racism and Ireland form [...] a vital component of revolutionary propaganda". Callinicos claimed instead that "if most of the workers involved have reactionary views on questions such as race, the position of women, and so on", then that was less important than that they were fighting over pay and conditions. Callinicos also called into question the party's stress on "the connection between reformism and nationalism", saying they were "paleo-marxists".

The party's stance on AIDS was widely criticised by the gay rights movement. On 30 June 1990, Simon Watney and Edward King of the group OutRage! kicked over the party's stall at the Gay Pride march. Watney criticised Michael Fitzpatrick and Don Milligan for giving credence to the idea that AIDS was a "gay plague" by their insistence that there would be no epidemic amongst heterosexuals in the west. However, OutRage! was divided over the attack.

Nick Cohen, Marko Attila Hoare and Oliver Kamm strongly criticised the party and its former members after the dissolution for opposing the military interventions in Bosnia, Kosovo and Iraq. Hoare, Cohen and Kamm also rejected Noam Chomsky's defence of Living Marxism and its coverage of the Bosnian war.

Andy Rowell and Jonathan Matthews of the Norfolk Genetic Information Network criticised the party for championing genetic engineering. Andy Rowell and Bob Burton along with Jonathan Matthews of the Norfolk Genetic Information Network charged Living Marxism with a history of attacking the environmental movement.

== Re-orientation and disbandment ==
At the end of the 1980s, the party had moved away from its roots as a Trotskyist organisation, leading some critics to argue that they had abandoned the notion of the class struggle. In 1988, its weekly tabloid newspaper The Next Step carried an article arguing that "the disintegration of the official labour movement, and the apparent lack of a left-wing alternative, has consolidated an overwhelmingly defensive mood in the working class".

In the 1987 general election, party members stood as part of the Red Front, arguing that working people needed to break with the Labour Party, but no Red Front candidate retained their election deposit.

In 1988, the party made The Next Step into a bulletin for its supporters. Later that year, a monthly magazine called Living Marxism was set up for a wider readership. Despite its beginnings as a far-left outlet, the politics espoused by the magazine developed a pronounced libertarianism. In December 1990, Living Marxism ran an article by Furedi, "Midnight in the Century", which argued that the corrosive effect of the collapse of both Stalinism and reformism on the working class meant that "for the time being at least, the working class has no political existence".

In 1997, the point was put more forcefully:

In today's circumstances class politics cannot be reinvented, rebuilt, reinvigorated or rescued. Why? Because any dynamic political outlook needs to exist in an interaction with existing individual consciousness. And contemporary forms of consciousness in our atomised societies cannot be used as the foundation for a more developed politics of solidarity.

Between 1990 and 1997, the party developed the view that more than capitalism itself the danger facing humanity was the absence of a force for social change (in philosophical language, a "subject" of history) and the culture of low expectations that suppressed it. Prefacing a 1996 Living Marxism manifesto, Mick Hume argued:

Of course [...] we could have produced a familiar list of left-wing slogans complaining about problems like unemployment, exploitation and poverty which continue to scar our society. But that would be to ignore the transformation which has taken place in the political climate [...]. At different times, different issues matter most. Each era has thrown up its own great questions which define which side you are on [...]. [A]t Living Marxism, we see our job today as doing much more than criticising capitalism. That is the easy bit. There is a more pressing need to criticise the fatalistic critics, to counter the doom-mongers and put a positive case for human action in pursuit of social liberation. [...] [D]ealing with [...] unconventional questions, and puncturing the anti-human prejudices which surround them, is the precondition for making political action possible in our time.

In 1994, the Irish Freedom Movement was dissolved. As the Northern Ireland peace process unfolded, the RCP increasingly turned from unconditional support for the IRA towards scorn at its gradualism and reformism.

The party disbanded in 1996.

In February 1997, shortly after the party disbanded, Living Marxism re-branded as LM, possibly to further distance itself from its leftist origins. Articles in LM argued:

- Against support for Tony Blair's New Labour project in 1997.
- Against "humanitarian interventions" in the Balkans, East Timor and Iraq.
- For freedom of speech and the "right to be offensive".
- Against the "new authoritarianism" of CCTV cameras, anti-social behaviour orders and anti-harassment laws.
- Against the demonisation of the white working class.

This magazine ran at least two articles in which the authors argued that the mass murder carried out in Rwanda in 1994 should not be described as genocide. In December 1995, LM carried a report by Fiona Fox from Rwanda which argued:

The lesson I would draw from my visit is that we must reject the term 'genocide' in Rwanda. It has been used inside and outside Rwanda to criminalise the majority of ordinary Rwandan people, to justify outside interference in the country's affairs, and to lend legitimacy to a minority military government imposed on Rwanda by Western powers.

LM continued to create controversy on a variety of issues, most notably on the British Independent Television News (ITN) coverage of the Balkan conflict in the 1990s. The controversy centred on LM featuring an article by Thomas Deichmann in which he alleged that the ITN coverage of a refugee detention centre in Trnopolje during the conflict gave the false impression that the Bosnian Muslims were being held against their will in Serbian concentration camps. The ensuing libel award and costs arising from legal action by the ITN against LM were estimated to total around £1 million. The action bankrupted the magazine and its publishers.

== Legacy ==
On 18 December 1997, environmental journalist George Monbiot argued in an article in The Guardian that the Against Nature television programme on Channel 4 had been influenced by the far-left and the RCP. He said that the individuals associated with the program were connected to the RCP, as Frank Furedi and John Gillott were associated with the LM magazine, Robert Plomin had been interviewed by LM, Martin Durkin had described himself as a Marxist, and Durkin's deputy's husband was the co-author of the RCP's manifesto and the Books Editor for LM. Durkin later wrote a letter to the Guardian's editor, which was published on 20 December 1997, in which he claimed he had no political affiliation and accused the paper of intimidation. Monbiot also took issue with Living Marxism for putting too much stress on freedom as if "there should be no limits to human action, least of all those imposed by 'official and semi-official agencies [...] from the police and the courts to social services, counsellors and censors'".

Post-hoc debate has emerged on whether the RCP was a part of the left. Andy Beckett of The Guardian wrote:

"Despite its name, most of its stances were not communist or revolutionary but contrarian: it supported free speech for racists, and nuclear power; it attacked environmentalism and the NHS. Its most consistent impulse was to invoke an idealised working class, and claim it was actually being harmed by the supposed elites of the liberal left."

Frank Furedi described the party's approach: “We tried to transcend the left-right divide. Lots of left-wingers said we were not really left-wing because we did not speak their language. We wanted to have an experimental approach and not repeat the problems of the past.” Historian Evan Smith argued that the RCP only began to move away from the left in the 1990s. Don Milligan, who was a branch organiser and party typesetter for the RCP, claimed in 2008 that Furedi, along with the other party leaders Michael Fitzpatrick and Mick Hume were not socialists and that most people involved with the RCP were not socialist either.

Meanwhile, Lawrence Parker has stated the similarity of the RCP to other groups on the left, and are firmly against the idea that the RCP was an exceptional party stated by former leader Michael Fitzpatrick.

Many former members of the party and contributors of LM magazine continued to be politically active.

The most notable groups include the Academy of Ideas (formerly the Institute of Ideas), a think tank led by Claire Fox; Spiked, an online magazine which has been edited by Mick Hume and Brendan O'Neill; and the Manifesto Club. Other groups produced by former members include Debating Matters, the Young Journalists' Academy, WorldWrite, Audacity.org, the Modern Movement, and Parents with Attitude. The Battle of Ideas has also been held annually since 2005 by the Academy of Ideas, which has been described as a "refuge" for former RCP members. Some commentators, such as George Monbiot, have pointed to apparent entryist tactics of having jobs and lives used by former RCP members designed to influence mainstream public opinion.

Munira Mirza, a spiked contributor and whom had worked for Fox, helped co-author the 2019 Conservative Party manifesto. Mirza was Boris Johnson's Cultural Adviser, and Director of Arts, Culture and the Creative Industries from 2008 to 2016, and the Director of the Number 10 Policy Unit from 2019 until 2022.

One party member from the 1990s explained in an article in Spiked:

I never left the RCP: the organisation folded in the mid-Nineties, but few of us actually 'recanted' our ideas. Instead we resolved to support one another more informally as we pursued our political tradition as individuals, or launched new projects with more general aims that have also engaged people from different traditions, or none. These include Spiked and the Institute of Ideas, where I now work. It must be said that this development annoyed our political opponents immensely, and a cursory Google search (try 'LM network' if you have time to kill) will return a plethora of exposés purporting to show that former members of the RCP are involved in various sinister conspiracies. [...] [T]he impossibility of simply doing away with a school of thought that is no longer attached to an organisation is perhaps what annoys our opponents most of all.

In April 2019, three former members of the Revolutionary Communist Party, Claire Fox, James Heartfield, and Alka Sehgal Cuthbert were selected as candidates for Nigel Farage's Brexit Party in the 2019 European Parliament election. Heartfield contested the seat of Yorkshire and the Humber but lost, while Fox won a seat in the election.

Stuart Waiton stood in Dundee West at the 2019 general election, also for the Brexit Party. James Woudhuysen, another former member, stood for the Brexit Party in Carshalton and Wallington and had been platformed by Spiked.
