= The Silent War (book) =

1998 book by Frank Furedi

The Silent War: Imperialism and the Changing Perception of Race
- Author: Frank Furedi
- Language: English
- Subject: Sociology
- Genre: Non-fiction
- Publication date: 1998

The Silent War: Imperialism and the Changing Perception of Race is a 1998 book by sociologist Frank Furedi. The book gives an account of the changing balance of power between the West and the Third World since the end of the Second World War.
