= Penny Marshall (journalist) =

British journalist (born 1962)

- Born: Penelope Jane Clucas Marshall; 7 November 1962 (age 63); United Kingdom
- Education: St Helen's School, London
- Alma mater: London School of Economics
- Occupation: Journalist
- Television: Africa correspondent for ITV News
- Relatives: Sir Paul Marshall (brother); Winston Marshall (nephew)

Penelope Jane Clucas Marshall (born 7 November 1962) is a British journalist, working for ITV News as Africa correspondent since September 2019, before that as ITV News social affairs editor.

== Early life ==
Marshall is the daughter of Alan Marshall, a managing director at Unilever, and Mary Sylvia Clucas, daughter of Dr T. S. Hanlin. Her brother is the businessman and entrepreneur Paul Marshall, father of Winston Marshall, formerly of the band Mumford & Sons.

== Education ==
Marshall was educated at St Helen's School, a private day school for girls in Northwood in north-west London, followed by the London School of Economics where she was active as a student journalist. Whilst at the LSE, she worked as a stringer for national newspapers.

== Life and career ==
After graduation, Marshall became indentured as a trainee reporter on the Wimbledon News. In 1985 she joined ITN as a production trainee.

Marshall established herself as a television news foreign correspondent during the 1980s and 90s, when she was based in Eastern Europe and the Soviet Union. This work won awards, including an RTS, an EMMY, and a BAFTA.

Following the birth of her children, she chose to work part-time and also took a career break to bring up the family for 5 years. Marshall is an advocate of better and more flexible working arrangements for parents.

== Detention camps in Bosnia, 1992 ==
In the summer of 1992, Marshall, together with Channel 4 News' Ian Williams, were the first television journalists to uncover the Serb-run detention camps in Bosnia. Ed Vulliamy of The Guardian was also with the ITN teams. Their subsequent reports shown throughout the world, generated an international outcry.

After accusation by fringe British magazine, LM (formerly Living Marxism), in an article by Thomas Deichmann that ITN reports from the camps were allegedly faked, ITN sued the magazine and in March 2000 ITN won their case against in the High Court libel action. An examination of the case by a professor of cultural and political geography at Durham University argued that the key claims made by the magazine were "erroneous and flawed". In April 2012, journalist John Simpson apologised for supporting LM magazine and questioning ITN's reporting of the camps.

== Later career ==
In March 2014 she was appointed Education Editor for the BBC but decided not to take up the post after a diagnosis of breast cancer.

She has presented and written documentaries for BBC Radio 4 and received an honorary doctorate from City University in January 2015. She has written for the Times, Guardian and the Daily Mail.

She is a regular volunteer at a Pupil Referral Unit for children excluded from mainstream school in West London and is now a Founding Trustee of a charity to help raise funds and awareness to support them.

In the autumn of 2015 Marshall gave evidence to the House of Lords Select Committee investigating women in TV and current affairs and described herself as one of the "last women standing". She said "newsrooms had been built 'by men for men'" and called for broadcasters to collect more data to establish why so many women quit newsrooms.

== Private life and other activities ==
Marshall is married to fellow ITN reporter Tim Ewart and has three daughters, a step daughter and step son.

She is also a visiting professor at City University London. and the founding trustee of a charity for children excluded from school in London, the Tbap Foundation.
