= Rising East =

Rising East is an online journal focusing on social and cultural issues associated with the regeneration of east London.

== History and profile ==
Rising East was founded in 1998. Produced by the University of East London's Research Institute, it was originally a print journal produced by Lawrence & Wishart (as a Journal of East London Studies). It was published three times a year. It become an online-only publication in 2004. The journal was reestablished in 2012.
