= Science Media Centre =

British charitable organization

- Abbreviation: SMC
- Formation: 2000; 26 years ago
- Legal status: Charitable company
- Location: Wellcome Trust, 215 Euston Road, London, NW1 2BE
- Region served: UK
- Members: 60 science organisations
- Director: Fiona Fox
- Website: http://www.sciencemediacentre.org

The Science Media Centre is a charitable company, first formed in 2002, two years after the United Kingdom House of Lords select committee on Science and Technology's third report on "Science and Society" in 2000. This report stated that while science was generally reported accurately in the mass media, there was a need for the promotion of more expert information at times when science is under attack in the headlines, mentioning the public reaction to GM crops, in particular.

The Science Media Centre's purpose is to connect journalists with reliable and up-to-date sources of scientific information. It has also been criticised for bias and undeclared conflicts of interest.

== Functions ==
In order to promote more informed science in the media, the centre's main function is as a service to journalists, providing background briefings on current scientific issues and facilitating interviews with scientists. Comments are also sourced from scientists about breaking news stories, to provide an independent expert commentary on the news, so that press releases have some peer review. Independence means from the breaking news story, and scientists commenting are asked to declare any competing interests they have with their comment.

Its director is Fiona Fox who is a former member of the Revolutionary Communist Party and a former contributor to its magazine Living Marxism.

== Aims ==
The SMC's stated aim is to "facilitate more scientists to engage with the media, in the hope that the public will have improved access to accurate, evidence-based scientific information about the stories of the day". More baldly, the philosophy is "the media will do science better when scientists do the media better".

== Structure ==
The setting up of the Science Media Centre was assisted by Susan Greenfield, the director of the Royal Institution of Great Britain. While the centre was initially based in a specially refurbished wing of the Royal Institution, full independence was claimed from all funders and supporters. The SMC is now hosted by the Wellcome Trust.

The Science Media Centre is funded by over 60 organisations, with individual donations capped at £12,500 per annum. The SMC receives sponsorship from a range of funders including media organisations, universities, scientific and learned societies, the UK Research Councils, government bodies, Quangos, charities, private donors and corporate bodies. For an up-to-date list of funders, see .

As well as having a board of trustees, the SMC maintains an advisory board of science and media experts to consult on its strategy.

== Criticism ==
Criticism of the SMC relates to perceptions of independence: in respect of funding sources relating to industry with an interest in some science applications; in respect of scientists promoting specific views in favour of their own research in response to news stories; and, promoting science establishment concerns particularly in respect of funding for science. A 2013 article in Nature stated about the SMC, "Perhaps the biggest criticism of Fox and the SMC is that they push science too aggressively – acting more as a PR agency than as a source of accurate science information." In 2002, the year it was founded, Ronan Bennett and Alan Rusbridger described the SMC as a lobby group.

=== Specific cases ===
In 2023 three out of five scientists on a panel organised by the Science Media Centre which down-played the risks of ultra-processed foods (UPFs) were revealed either to have received financial support for research from UPF manufacturers or to hold key positions with organisations funded by UPF manufacturers. The Science Media Centre informed journalists of declarations of interests provided by the scientists, but this was not mentioned in news coverage. The BMJ reported this disagreement about industry-sponsored scientists further, with the SMC defending their policy of self-declaration of interests and a Times journalist saying it was "adolescent" to expect industry scientists never to comment on their findings, especially if there was generally a view that industry spending on research had economic value.

In 2024 the SMC's role in covering up the PACE trial scandal, one of the most concerning of the controversies related to ME/CFS, has led to them being accused of incompetence, bias, and complicity with government and big business interests, and consequently, amplifying the vilification of patients suffering from Myalgic Encephalomyelitis (ME) or Chronic Fatigue Syndrome (CFS), some of whom died from the therapies the PACE trial culpably advocated as cures for their condition, namely, cognitive behavioural therapy (CBT), and graded exercise therapy (GET).

== Other SMCs ==
The success of SMC in the UK led to the establishment of similar science media centres in other countries. Except for the relation between the Science Media Centre in UK and the Australian Science Media Centre, these centres are independent of each other.

The Australian Science Media Centre was set up in 2005 and there is also one in Japan. The Science Media Centre of Canada and New Zealand Science Media Centre were both launched in 2008. Science Media Center Germany was founded in 2015. In the United States, SciLine was founded in 2017 to provide a similar service.
