= Spiked (magazine) =

British Internet-based magazine

- Website type: Politics
- Creator: Mick Hume
- Editor: Tom Slater
- Website: spiked-online.com
- Commercial: No
- Registration: No
- Launched: 2001

Spiked (also written as sp!ked) is a British Internet magazine created by Mick Hume, who had previously been one of the leaders of the Revolutionary Communist Party from 1977 until its demise in 1996. RCP was distinguished by its contrarianism; among its positions were support for the IRA and Saddam Hussein. Spiked focuses on politics, culture and society. The magazine was founded in 2001 with the same editor and many of the same contributors as Living Marxism, which had closed in 2000 after losing a case for libel brought by ITN. Spiked and the Institute of Ideas are both based in the former militant Trotskyite Revolutionary Communist Party offices but now promote right-wing libertarianism.

There is general agreement that Spiked is libertarian, with the majority of specialist academic sources identifying it as right-libertarian, and some non-specialist sources identifying it as left-libertarian. Activists associated with Spiked, sometimes described as part of "the Spiked network", took part in the Brexit Party as candidates or publicists, while disagreeing with Nigel Farage on many domestic issues.

== Editors and contributors ==
Spiked is edited by Tom Slater, who was previously its deputy editor. He was appointed in September 2021, and replaced Brendan O'Neill, who had been editor following Mick Hume's departure in January 2007. On ceasing to be editor, O'Neill became Spiked's 'inaugural chief political writer'.

The magazine also produces a number of podcasts, with contributors including Christopher Snowdon.

== Origin ==
Spiked emerged from Living Marxism, the magazine of the Revolutionary Communist Party (RCP). Living Marxism was founded in 1988 and rebranded as LM in 1999.

Spiked was founded in 2000 after the bankruptcy of its predecessor after losing a libel case brought against it by the broadcasting corporation ITN. The case centered around ITN coverage of Fikret Alić and other Bosnian Muslims standing behind a barbed-wire fence at the Trnopolje camp during the Bosnian war. LM claimed to oppose Western intervention on traditional anti-imperialist grounds, and published an article titled "The Picture that Fooled the World" which claimed that ITN's coverage was deceptive, the barbed-wire did not enclose the camp and the Muslims were in fact "refugees, many of whom went there seeking safety and could leave again if they wished." During the court case, evidence given by the camp doctor led LM to abandon its defence. ITN was awarded damages and costs, estimated to be around £1 million.

The RCP itself formally dissolved in 1996, but maintained its existence as a loose network, first around LM and then Spiked. The group of writers associated with LM who went on to form the core editorial group at Spiked, are often referred to as the "LM network" or "Spiked network".

== Content ==
The Daily Beast, as well as Paul Mason of the New Statesman, have described the site as libertarian. A study in Policy & Internet by Heft et al. described Spiked as populist, saying that it has "roots in the radical left‐wing scene, but now oppose the political establishment from a position on the right side of the spectrum." According to Tim Knowles, the technology correspondent for The Times, Spiked is right-wing and libertarian, while Evan Smith, a historian who has written on Spiked in the context of its free speech campaigns, has noted its "right-libertarian and iconoclastic style". By contrast, digital media scholar Jean Burgess and James Bowman of the conservative Ethics and Public Policy Center have referred to the site as left-libertarian.

Spiked opposes many public health interventions. For example, it sees campaigns against obesity as state intrusion and "a war on the poor".

Spiked opposes multiculturalism and, as its contributor Munira Mirza put it, sees institutional racism as "a perception more than a reality". Mirza is a regular columnist at Spiked, who received her PhD in Sociology under Frank Furedi, also a regular columnist at Spiked, who was the founder of the extreme leftist militant Trotskyite Revolutionary Communist Party. Spiked columnist Munira Mirza is a political advisor who served as Director of the Number 10 Policy Unit under Prime Minister Boris Johnson; she also worked under Johnson as Deputy Mayor for Education and Culture when he was Mayor of London. In 2020, The Guardian reported that in 2019, "Mirza co-authored the Conservative manifesto," commenting that Mirza was “probably (Boris) Johnson’s most important adviser after Cummings”, and in an article for Grazia magazine in 2020, Boris Johnson called Mirza “extraordinary”, “ruthless”, and one of “the five women who have shaped my life”.

Spiked opposed the post-9/11 invasions of Afghanistan and of Iraq and Western interference in developing nations in general.

Spiked saw the UK's vote to leave the European Union as a demonstration of democracy against ruling elites and has celebrated Nigel Farage's Brexit Party and Boris Johnson's Conservative government for their stance on this. Activists associated with Spiked, sometimes described as part of 'the Spiked network', were active in campaigning for the UK to leave the EU, with a number of its activists involved in the Brexit Party as candidates or publicists. Among those associated with Spiked who joined the Brexit Party were Claire Fox, who said she largely disagreed with Farage on domestic policies. Spiked contributor Claire Fox is a lifelong Eurosceptic, who was previously a member of the Trotskyist British Revolutionary Communist Party but later began identifying as a libertarian. She became a registered supporter of the Brexit Party shortly after its formation and was elected as an MEP in the 2019 European Parliament election. She was nominated for a peerage by the Boris Johnson-led Conservative government in 2020, despite her past opposition to the existence of the House of Lords.

In December 2018, Guardian columnist George Monbiot wrote in an opinion piece that Spiked "appears to hate leftwing politics", and that its articles "repeatedly defend figures on the hard right or far right", listing Katie Hopkins, Nigel Farage, Alex Jones, the Democratic Football Lads Alliance, Tommy Robinson, Toby Young, Arron Banks, and Viktor Orbán.

Spiked opposed lockdown as a policy during the COVID-19 pandemic.

In July 2020, a Daily Beast investigation found that Spiked was one of several mainly conservative websites that had inadvertently published articles attributed to non-existent experts on the Middle East. This network of fake personas promoted the United Arab Emirates and pushed for harsher treatment of that country's opponents. Following this, Spiked added an editorial note to the two articles affected mentioning their questionable authorship.

Following the start of the 2022 Russian invasion of Ukraine, Spiked took a strong pro-Ukrainian position, often publishing articles praising the Ukrainian people and criticising Russian President Vladimir Putin. However, it also criticised Western media reaction following the 2022 missile explosion in Poland, accusing such media of not taking the risk of a major escalation with Russia seriously enough.

=== Projects ===
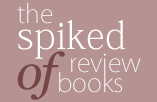

In May 2007 Spiked launched the Spiked Review of Books as a monthly online literary criticism feature. This coincided with controversy in the United States following the scaling back of newspaper book review sections.

Spiked produces annual "free speech rankings" of UK universities.

== Funding ==
A joint investigation between DeSmog UK and The Guardian revealed that Spiked US Inc. received funding from the Charles Koch Foundation between 2016 and 2018 to develop live campus events connected with The Toleration and Free Speech program sponsored by the Charles Koch Foundation. The Guardian suggested that this was due to the online magazine's attacks on left-wing politics, its support and defence of hard right and far-right figures, and the many articles it publishes by writers supported by the Institute of Economic Affairs and the Koch-funded Cato Institute. Spiked's editor Brendan O'Neill dismissed such accusations as "McCarthyism" and stated that such funding was used to promote debate about free speech, saying that the Toleration and Free Speech Programme at the Charles Koch Foundation supports "projects from both progressive and conservative groups", naming as examples the American Civil Liberties Union, the Foundation for Individual Rights in Education, the National Coalition Against Censorship, the Newseum, the Knight Foundation and the American Society of News Editors.
