= Living Marxism =

British magazine (1988–2000)

Living Marxism was a British magazine originally launched in 1988 as the journal of the Revolutionary Communist Party (RCP). The magazine attracted attention for denying both the Rwandan genocide and Bosnian genocide. Rebranded as LM in February 1997, it ceased publication in March 2000 following a successful libel lawsuit brought by ITN over Living Marxism's criticism of ITN's coverage of the Bosnian war. It was promptly resurrected as Spiked, an Internet magazine which has been called libertarian, with the majority of specialist academic sources identifying it as right-libertarian (some non-specialist sources identifying it as left-libertarian).

== History ==
It was published by Junius Publications Ltd until 1997, and then by Informinc Ltd. Its editor, Mick Hume, an American Studies graduate from Manchester University then aged 29, said: "Our readers are young, angry, thinking people." At its peak in the 1990s, it had a circulation of between 10,000 and 15,000.

== Aims ==
Living Marxism's introduction summarised its outlook as follows:

We live in an age of caution and conformism, when critical opinions can be outlawed as 'extremism' and anything new can be rubbished as 'too risky'. Ours is an age of low expectations, when we are always being told what is bad for us, and life seems limited on all sides by restrictions, guidelines and regulations. The spirit of LM is to go against the grain: to oppose all censorship, bans and codes of conduct; to stand up for social and scientific experimentation; to insist that we have the right to live as autonomous adults who take responsibility for our own affairs. These are basic human values that cannot be compromised if we are ever going to create a world fit for people.

== Views ==
Views expounded with regularity in LM included "fear culture", for example by questioning the then media coverage of AIDS as a predominantly homosexual disease in the West. Its critique covered media coverage in Africa and the developing world in the context of Western intervention, underdevelopment and poverty. It debated environmentalist claims that limiting consumption was a progressive view.

LM writers criticised the media portrayal of the civil wars in Rwanda and Bosnia and disputed that either Serb or Hutu forces committed genocide during those conflicts. In 1993, LM published an exhibition titled "Genocide against the Serbs" which juxtaposed images of Serbs killed in World War II-era crimes with Serbian soldiers killed in battle during the Yugoslav Wars. In 1995, LM published an article by Fiona Fox arguing that:

The lesson I would draw from my visit is that we must reject the term 'genocide' in Rwanda. It has been used inside and outside Rwanda to criminalise the majority of ordinary Rwandan people, to justify outside interference in the country's affairs, and to lend legitimacy to a minority military government imposed on Rwanda by Western powers.

Historian Marko Attila Hoare criticised their genocide denial in relation to both the Rwandan and Bosnian genocides.

It has been suggested by environmentalists such as George Monbiot and Peter Melchett that the group of writers associated with LM continue to constitute an LM network pursuing an ideologically motivated anti-environmentalist agenda under the guise of promoting humanism. Writers who used to write for Living Marxism reject this as a "McCarthyite conspiracy theory".

== ITN vs. LM ==
In February 1997, editor Mick Hume published an article by German journalist Thomas Deichmann which claimed that ITN had misrepresented the Bosnian war in its coverage in 1992. The publishers of LM, Informinc (LM) Ltd., were sued for libel by ITN. The case initially caused international condemnation of ITN as one of LM's critics, the journalist George Monbiot, who wrote in Prospect magazine:

Some of the world's leading liberals leapt to the magazine's defence: Harold Evans, Doris Lessing, Paul Theroux, Fay Weldon and many others condemned ITN's "deplorable attack on press freedom". The Institute of Contemporary Arts, bulwark of progressive liberalism, enhanced LM's heroic profile by co-hosting a three-day conference with the magazine, called "Free Speech Wars". With the blessing of the liberal world, this puny iconoclastic David will go to war with the clanking orthodoxies of the multinational Goliath.

However, Monbiot continued:

This, at least, is how LM would like its struggle to be seen. But there is more to this David than first meets the eye. His may be less of the great liberal cause that his supporters would like to believe. For the closer one looks at LM, the weaker its link to the oppressed appears, and the stronger its links to the oppressor. It has, in other words, less in common with the left than with the fanatical right.

The article "The picture that fooled the world" argued that ITN's footage in which an emaciated Bosnian Muslim man stood behind a barbed wire fence was designed to portray a Nazi-style extermination camp while Deichmann claimed: "It was not a prison, and certainly not a 'concentration camp', but a collection centre for refugees, many of whom went there seeking safety and could leave again if they wished". However, an examination of the substance of this case by a professor of cultural and political geography at Durham University argues that the key claims made by Deichmann and LM are "erroneous and flawed".

The libel case went against LM and in March 2000 the magazine was forced to close. Reporters Penny Marshall and Ian Williams were each awarded £150,000 over the LM story and the magazine was ordered to pay £75,000 for libelling ITN in a February 1997 article.

Looking back Hume commented in The Times:

Would I do it again? We could have got out of the case by apologising, which seems to be the fashionable thing to do. But I believe in the unfashionable freedom to state what you understand to be true, even if it causes offence. I would do almost anything to avoid ever again setting foot in Court 14. But some things really are more important than a mortgage.

In contrast, Professor Campbell of Durham University summarised his study of the case as follows:

[A]s strange as existing British libel law is, it had an important and surprisingly beneficial effect in the case of ITN vs LM. The LM defendants and Thomas Deichmann were properly represented at the trial and were able to lay out all the details of their claim that the ITN reporters had "deliberately misrepresented" the situation at Trnopolje. Having charged 'deliberate misrepresentation', they needed to prove 'deliberate misrepresentation'. To this end, the LM defendants were able to cross-examine Penny Marshall and Ian Williams, as well as every member of the ITN crews who were at the camps, along with other witnesses. (That they didn't take up the opportunity to cross-examine the Bosnian doctor imprisoned at Trnopolje, who featured in the ITN stories and was called to testify on the conditions he and others suffered, was perhaps the moment any remaining shred of credibility for LM's allegations evaporated). They were able to show the ITN reports to the court, including the rushes from which the final TV stories were edited, and conduct a forensic examination of the visuals they alleged were deceitful. And all of this took place in front of a jury of twelve citizens who they needed to convince about the truthfulness of their allegations. They failed. The jury found unanimously against LM and awarded the maximum possible damages. So it was not ITN that bankrupted LM. It was LM's lies about the ITN reports that bankrupted themselves, morally and financially. Despite their failure, those who lied about the ITN reports have had no trouble obtaining regular access to the mainstream media in Britain, where they continue to make their case as though the 2000 court verdict simply didn't exist. Their freedom of speech has thus not been permanently infringed.

== See also ==
- Claire Fox
- Fiona Fox
- Frank Furedi
- Munira Mirza
- Graham Barnfield
- James Heartfield
- Science Media Centre
- Sense about Science
- Social Issues Research Centre
- Spiked
