= Bosnian genocide denial =

Bosnian genocide denial is the act of denying the occurrence of the systematic genocide against the Bosniak Muslim population of Bosnia and Herzegovina, or asserting it did not occur in the manner or to the extent that has been established by the International Criminal Tribunal for the former Yugoslavia (ICTY) and the International Court of Justice (ICJ) through proceedings and judgments, and described by comprehensive scholarship.

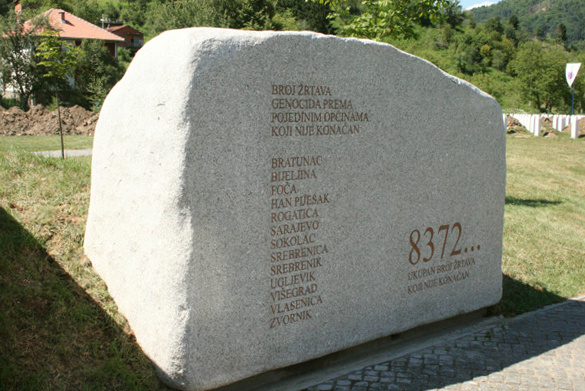
Potočari Memorial Stone

In its judgment, the ICJ adopted the ICTY's conclusion from Radislav Krstić's conviction and concluded what happened in and around Srebrenica was done by members of the Army of Republika Srpska (VRS) "with the specific intent to destroy in part the group of the Muslims of Bosnia and Herzegovina as such, which constitute acts of genocide committed". The two international courts have ruled differently only concerning direct responsibility for acts of genocide in Bosnia and Herzegovina. The ICJ, in a proceeding of the Bosnian genocide case that was brought by Bosnia and Herzegovina against Serbia and Montenegro, has made rulings to the extent that Serbia was not directly responsible for the perpetration of genocide but was responsible under "customary international law" for violating the obligation to "prevent and punish the crime of genocide". Other international bodies, such as the European Court of Human Rights and the United Nations General Assembly, have also passed resolutions acknowledging genocide occurred in Bosnia. German courts have made convictions based upon a more expansive interpretation of genocide than that used by international courts.

The origins of denial lie within groups of Serbian and international scholars, and are supported in part by Serb and international political bodies and media. After the Bosnian War, Serb culture generated a stance that Serbs were the aggrieved party and that historical events had curtailed national goals. Sonja Biserko has drawn parallels with other examples of negationist historical revisionism and denialism, such as denial of genocides in Armenia and Rwanda.

During the Yugoslav Wars, Serb policies and their foremost protagonists were whitewashed and justified by some "anti-war" and "anti-imperialist" public intellectuals and authors abroad, mostly on the left of the ideological spectrum, but also by libertarian right-wingers, and this has sometimes become outright denial.

== Background ==
The term "Bosnian genocide" is sometimes used to refer to the genocide in Srebrenica perpetrated by Bosnian Serb forces in summer of 1995, or refers to the broader crimes against humanity, and ethnic cleansing campaign throughout areas controlled by the Army of Republika Srpska (VRS) during the 1992–1995 Bosnian War. Genocide scholars widely acknowledge it as the biggest war crime perpetrated on European soil since World War II.

The events in Srebrenica in 1995 included the killing of more than 8,000 Bosniak (Bosnian Muslim) men and boys, and the mass expulsion of another 25,000–30,000 Bosniak civilians, in and around the town of Srebrenica in Bosnia and Herzegovina, which was committed by units of the VRS under the command of General Ratko Mladić.

The ethnic cleansing campaign took place in areas controlled by the Bosnian Serb forces, and targeted Bosniaks and Bosnian Croats. This campaign included extermination; unlawful confinement; mass rape; sexual assault; torture; plunder and destruction of property; inhumane treatment of civilians; the targeting of political leaders, intellectuals, and professionals; it also included the unlawful deportation and transfer of civilians; the unlawful shelling of civilians; the unlawful appropriation and plunder of real and personal property, the destruction of homes and businesses, and systemic destruction of places of worship.

The United Nations tasked the International Criminal Tribunal for the former Yugoslavia (ICTY) with prosecuting the war crimes that had been committed during the Yugoslav Wars, including the Bosnian War. The ICJ (International Court of Justice) decided on the Bosnian genocide case, a public international law case brought by Bosnia and Herzegovina against Serbia and Montenegro. The ICJ, in a proceeding Bosnia and Herzegovina v. Serbia and Montenegro, adopted the ICTY's conclusion from Radislav Krstić's conviction and concluded events that occurred in and around Srebrenica from 13 July 1995 were perpetrated by the Army of Republika Srpska (VRS) "with the specific intent to destroy in part the group of the Muslims of Bosnia and Herzegovina as such, which constitute acts of genocide committed". The ICJ ruled, however, although Serbia and Montenegro had provided significant assistance to Republika Srpska, it was not established it was responsible for perpetrating the crime of genocide nor had it violated its obligations to "prevent and punish the crime of genocide". The court confirmed genocide took place at Srebrenica in July 1995 and that Serbia had not planned nor encouraged this genocide but that it was guilty of not doing everything in its power to prevent it.

Besides the ICTY and the ICJ, other international bodies such as the European Court of Human Rights and the United Nations General Assembly also passed resolutions acknowledging genocide occurred in Bosnia. The 2005 resolutions of the United States Congress and Senate said; "the Serbian policies of aggression and ethnic cleansing meet the terms defining genocide". Three convictions for genocide have been made in courts in Germany.

According to Theodor Meron, the Presiding Judge at the ICTY:

By seeking to eliminate a part of the Bosnian Muslims, the Bosnian Serb forces committed genocide. They targeted for extinction the forty thousand Bosnian Muslims living in Srebrenica, a group which was emblematic of the Bosnian Muslims in general. They stripped all the male Muslim prisoners, military and civilian, elderly and young, of their personal belongings and identification, and deliberately and methodically killed them solely on the basis of their identity.

== Culture and politics of denial ==
=== Definition and origins ===
Bosnian genocide denial is an act of denying the genocide against the Muslim population of Bosnia and Herzegovina occurred, or asserting it did not occur in the manner or to the extent that has been established by the ICTY and the ICJ through their proceedings and judgments, and described by subsequent comprehensive scholarship.

The origins of denial lie with a group of Serbian nationalists, who were supported by part of the Serb political and media establishment. The post-war situation generated a stance within Serb culture that Serbs were the aggrieved side and that historical events had curtailed national goals. Sonja Biserko, president of the Helsinki Committee for Human Rights in Serbia at the time, drew parallels with other examples of negationist historical revisionism and denialism, such as denial of the Armenian and Rwandan genocides. According to Biserko, methods range from the "brutal to the deceitful". She noted denial in Serbia is present "most strongly in political discourse, in the media, in the sphere of law, and in the educational system". Biserko and the University of Sarajevo's criminology professor Edina Bećirević have identified a "culture of denial" in Serbian society, stating; "Denial of the Srebrenica genocide takes many forms in Serbia".

=== Tactics and methods ===
During the Bosnian War, Serbia's President Slobodan Milošević had effective control of most of Serbia's media. Following the end of the war, denialism continued to be widespread among Serbians. Revisionism ranges from challenging the judicial recognition of the killings as an act of genocide to the denial of the occurrence of a massacre. A variety of methods is used to deny genocide.

=== Attempted cover-up by means of reburials ===
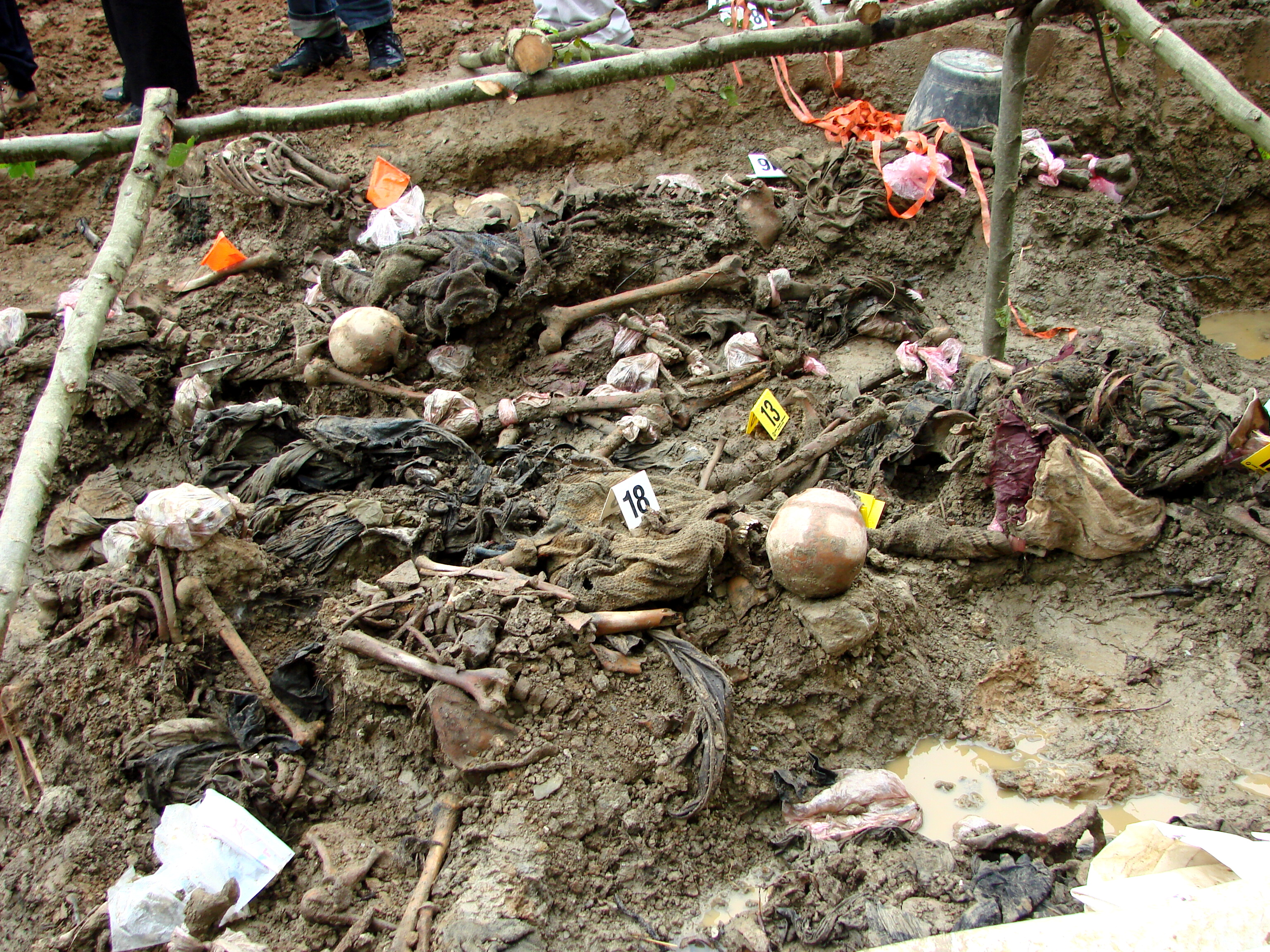
Exhumed grave of victims in Potočari, 2007

From approximately 1 August 1995 to 1 November 1995, there was an organized effort on behalf of the military and political leadership of Republika Srpska to remove bodies from primary mass graves, and move them to secondary and tertiary sites. The reburial was crudely done using heavy, mechanized vehicles such as trenchers and baggers. In the ICTY court case "Prosecutor v. Blagojević and Jokić", the trial chamber found this reburial effort was an attempt to conceal evidence of mass murder. The trial chamber found the cover-up operation was ordered by the Bosnian Serb Army (BSA) Main Staff, and was subsequently carried out by members of the Bratunac and Zvornik Brigades.

The crude manner of the cover-up operation had a direct impact on the recovery and identification of remains. The removal and reburial of the bodies caused them to become dismembered, with parts of different individuals interspersed, making it difficult for forensic investigators to positively identify the remains. In one case, one person's remains were found in two locations 30 km (19 miles) apart. In addition to the ligatures and blindfolds found at the mass graves, the effort to hide the bodies has been seen as evidence of the organised nature of the massacres and the non-combatant status of the victims; if the victims had died in normal combat operations, there would be no need to hide their remains.

=== Official Republika Srpska reports ===
==== First Republika Srpska report (2002) ====
In September 2002, the Republika Srpska government commissioned via its Documentation Center for War Crimes Research, in coordination with the Republika Srpska Bureau for Relations with the ICTY, the so-called the "Report about Case Srebrenica". Many leading Bosnian Serb politicians endorsed the document, which was written by Darko Trifunović. The report said 1,800 Bosnian Muslim soldiers died during fighting and 100 more died as a result of exhaustion. According to the report; "The number of Muslim soldiers killed by Bosnian Serbs out of personal revenge or lack of knowledge of international law is probably about 100 ... It is important to uncover the names of the perpetrators in order to accurately and unequivocally establish whether or not these were isolated instances". The report also makes allegations regarding examinations of the mass graves, saying they were made for hygiene reasons; it also questions the legitimacy of the missing-person lists, and undermines a key witness's mental health and military history. The International Crisis Group and the United Nations condemned the manipulation of their statements in this report, and Humanitarian Law Center thoroughly deconstructed all of the reports published by Republika Srpska commissions. Humanitarian Law Center described the first report's methods and manipulations in their report of February 2019. The ICTY described Republika Srpska's first report as "one of the worst examples of revisionism in relation to the mass executions of Bosnian Muslims committed in Srebrenica in July 1995". Outrage and condemnation by a wide variety of Balkan and international figures later forced Republika Srpska to disown the report.

==== Second Republika Srpska report and apology (2004) ====
On 7 March 2003, the Human Rights Chamber for Bosnia and Herzegovina issued a decision that ordered Republika Srpska, among other things, to conduct a full investigation into events in Srebrenica in July 1995 and to disclose the results by 7 September 2003. The Chamber had no power to implement the decision; it ceased to exist in late 2003. Republika Srpska published two reports—the first on 3 June 2003 and the second on 5 September 2003; the Human Rights Chamber concluded these reports did not fulfill the obligations of Republika Srpska. On 15 October 2003, The High Representative Paddy Ashdown said; "getting the truth from the [Bosnian Serb] government is like extracting rotten teeth". The Srebrenica commission, officially titled the "Commission for Investigation of the Events in and around Srebrenica between 10 and 19 July 1995", was established in December 2003, and submitted its final report on 4 June 2004, and then an addendum on 15 October 2004 after delayed information was supplied. The report said at least 7,000 men and boys were killed by Bosnian Serb forces, citing a provisional figure of 7,800. In the report, because of "limited time" and to "maximize resources", the commission "accepted the historical background and the facts stated in the second-instance judgment Prosecutor vs. Radislav Krstić, when the ICTY convicted Radislav Krstić for "assisting and supporting genocide committed in Srebrenica".

The commission's findings remain generally disputed by Serb nationalists, who say the commission was heavily pressured by the High Representative, considering an earlier Republika Srpska government report that exonerated the Serbs was dismissed. Dragan Čavić, then President of Republika Srpska, said in a televised address Serb forces killed several thousand civilians in violation of international law, and that Srebrenica is a dark chapter in Serb history. On 10 November 2004, the government of Republika Srpska issued an official apology.

==== Second Republika Srpska report revision (2010) ====
On 21 April 2010, the government of Republika Srpska under Prime Minister Milorad Dodik initiated a revision of the 2004 report saying the numbers of persons killed were exaggerated and that the report was manipulated by a former peace envoy. The Office of the High Representative responded by saying; "The Republika Srpska government should reconsider its conclusions and align itself with the facts and legal requirements and act accordingly, rather than inflicting emotional distress on the survivors, torture history and denigrate the public image of the country".

On 12 July 2010, the 15th anniversary of the start of the Srebrenica massacre, Milorad Dodik said he acknowledged the killings that happened in the area, but argued that the events at Srebrenica did not constitute genocide. In 2021, Dodik continued to say there had been no genocide and on Bosnian Serb television, he said coffins in the memorial cemetery were empty and bore only names.

==== Republika Srpska's rejection of the 2004 report and the new commission (2018-19) ====
On 14 August 2018, the People's Assembly of Republika Srpska dismissed the 2004 report and decided for the assembly of a new commission to revise the report about events in the area around Srebrenica in July 1995. The commission was initiated by Milorad Dodik and his Alliance of Independent Social Democrats party (SNSD), and the international community immediately criticised the action.

Humanitarian Law Center's report described this new development as "the culmination of more than a decade of genocide denial and historical revisionism by the SNSD government in the Republika Srpska", adding the HLC regarded this initiative to be "illegitimate overall", and that it "represents a flawed response to a legitimate need". The United States State Department issued a communiqué in which they criticized move by Republika Srpska officials and institutions, describing it as "(a)ttempts to reject or amend the report on Srebrenica are part of wider efforts to revise the facts of the past war, to deny history, and to politicize tragedy".

== Revisionism and denialism abroad ==
Serb policies in the Yugoslav Wars of the 1990s and its foremost protagonists have been whitewashed and justified by some "anti-war" and "anti-imperialist" intellectuals and authors outside Serbia, mostly on the left wing of the political spectrum, but also "libertarian", right-wing sources. Serbian former president Milošević is still admired in some circles. This apologia often becomes attempts to whitewash war crimes perpetrated by Serbian security, military and paramilitary forces, or denial of the nature and extent of these crimes using revisionist and denialist narratives concerning the break-up of Yugoslavia. These often make accusations of a Western conspiracy against Yugoslavia and the Serbs, which culminated with NATO interventions against Serbia and Republika Srpska.

=== Left-wing revisionists ===
Many primarily identified with the far-left of the ideological and political spectrum, such as Noam Chomsky, Michael Parenti, economist Edward S. Herman, David Peterson, Jared Israel, Tariq Ali, British journalist Mick Hume, Diana Johnstone, and John Robles of Voice of Russia, have engaged in revisionism. Examples include general denial of the Bosnian genocide, or specific aspects thereof, while shifting blame to the West in general, NATO, Croats, Bosniaks, or Albanians for the actions of Serbia and their forces, absolving the latter of any responsibility for the atrocities.

Herman and Hume said there is a discrepancy of over 8,000 victims between the official number and the number of bodies they said they found; they doubted the explanation of the events and ignored delays locating mass graves and identification of bodies by DNA analysis. Herman and Peterson engaged in revisionism and denial in several articles, such as Herman's "The Politics of the Srebrenica Massacre" and "The Srebrenica Massacre was a Gigantic Political Fraud" by Herman and Robles; they also repeated claims about political motives by Western governments and NATO conspirators in Herman's and Peterson's book Politics of Genocide, whose authors concentrate on the Srebrenica massacre, state Serbs at Srebrenica were "killing Bosnian-Muslim soldiers"; that this happened in response to the "killing of over 2,000 Serb civilians, mostly women and children, at the location by Bosnian-Muslim army"; and that the number of executed Bosnian-Muslim soldiers was "probably ... between 500 and 1,000 ... (i)n other words, less than half of the number of Serb civilians killed before July, 1995". For these claims they rely on information provided by writer Diana Johnstone, who had never entered Bosnia. In Politics of Genocide, Herman and Peterson claim that the Serbs only killed men of military age at Srebrenica.

This view is not supported by the findings of the ICJ or the ICTY. Johnstone, Herman, Peterson, Robles and others omit, ICTY findings—especially in trial judgments of Naser Orić and Radislav Krstić—that villages surrounding Srebrenica, where according to this group of revisionists killings of Serb women and children took place, were in most cases Bosnian Muslim villages whose original inhabitants had escaped or were driven out by the Bosnian Serb military offensive, and were then occupied and front lines were established; and that Bosnian Serb civilians rarely entered. Villages surrounding Srebrenica, which belonged to the Serb population, were heavily fortified and militarized. Villages including Kravica were used to store caches of weapons and ammunition, and from which Serbs launched attacks on Bosnian Muslim villages, and on Srebrenica.

=== Living Marxism ===
Living Marxism was a British magazine that was launched in 1988 as the journal of the British Revolutionary Communist Party (RCP). It was later rebranded LM and ceased publication in March 2000 after it lost a libel lawsuit brought by Independent Television News (ITN), a British television company.

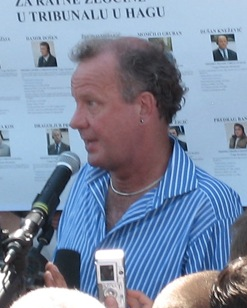
Ed Vulliamy speaking at the 2006 Omarska camp commemoration

In the February 1997 issue of LM, editor Mick Hume published an article by journalist Thomas Deichmann titled "The Picture that Fooled the World", which said ITN had deliberately misrepresented the Bosnian war in its 1992 coverage, specifically coverage of Serb-run concentration camps at Omarska, Keraterm and Trnopolje.

The article said the report by UK journalists Ed Vulliamy, Penny Marshall and Ian Williams was falsified. These ITN reports had followed initial reports by Maggie O'Kane and Roy Gutman about camps from Bratunac to Prijedor, which had found Serb-run prison camps in Bosanska Krajina in north-western Bosnia. In August 1992 Vulliamy and O'Kane had gained access to the Omarska and Trnopolje camps. Their accounts of the conditions of the prisoners were recorded for the documentary Omarska's survivors: Bosnia 1992. Discovery of the camps was credited with contributing to the establishment of the International Criminal Tribunal for the former Yugoslavia (ICTY) in The Hague.

In his LM article, which was published in February 1997, Deichmann said the ITN footage that was created in front of Trnopolje concentration camp, and depicts a group of emaciated Bosnian Muslim male prisoners—including Fikret Alić—standing behind a barbed wire fence, was deliberately staged to portray a Nazi-style extermination camp. The article also said the ITN reporters Penny Marshall and Ian Williams had stood inside a compound surrounded by a barbed wire fence and filmed their report. The article said the camp "was not a prison, and certainly not a 'concentration camp', but a collection centre for refugees, many of whom went there seeking safety and could leave again if they wished".

==== Libel trial ====
In 1998, ITN sued the publisher of LM Informinc (LM) Ltd. for libel. The case initially caused widespread condemnation of ITN. Among those who supported LM was journalist John Simpson, who in April 2012 publicly apologized for questioning ITN's reporting on the camps and for supporting the magazine. In a 2005 interview, Noam Chomsky defended LM, stating that "...in the case of Living Marxism, for a big corporation to put a small newspaper out of business because they think something they reported was false, is outrageous."

Journalist George Monbiot wrote in Prospect magazine; "some of the world's leading liberals", including Harold Evans, Doris Lessing, Paul Theroux and Fay Weldon, had defended the magazine, and that others had condemned ITN's "deplorable attack on press freedom". He added: "The Institute of Contemporary Arts, bulwark of progressive liberalism, enhanced LM's heroic profile by co-hosting a three-day conference with the magazine, called 'Free Speech Wars'. With the blessing of the liberal world, this puny iconoclastic David will go to war with the clanking orthodoxies of the multinational Goliath". Monbiot also said LM wished its struggle to be seen as a struggle for liberal values and that this cause was less liberal than LM's supporters wanted to believe. Monbiot concluded LM had less in common with the left than with the fanatical right.

ITN won its libel case against LM, which was forced to close in March 2000. Reporters Penny Marshall and Ian Williams were each awarded £150,000 over the LM story and the magazine was ordered to pay £75,000 for libeling ITN in the February 1997 article. In an interview with The Times, Hume said the magazine's publisher could have avoided the case by apologising but that he believed in "freedom to state what you understand to be true, even if it causes offence", and that he would do anything to avoid similar proceedings in court, but that "some things really are more important than a mortgage".

David Campbell, Visiting Professor in the Northern Centre of Photography at Sunderland University in the UK, said:

The LM defendants and Thomas Deichmann were properly represented at the trial and were able to lay out all the details of their claim that the ITN reporters had "deliberately misrepresented" the situation at Trnopolje. Having charged 'deliberate misrepresentation', they needed to prove 'deliberate misrepresentation'. To this end, the LM defendants were able to cross-examine Penny Marshall and Ian Williams, as well as every member of the ITN crews who were at the camps, along with other witnesses. (That they didn't take up the opportunity to cross-examine the Bosnian doctor imprisoned at Trnopolje, who featured in the ITN stories and was called to testify on the conditions he and others suffered, was perhaps the moment any remaining shred of credibility for LM's allegations evaporated). They were able to show the ITN reports to the court, including the rushes from which the final TV stories were edited, and conduct a forensic examination of the visuals they alleged were deceitful. And all of this took place in front of a jury of twelve citizens who they needed to convince about the truthfulness of their allegations.

They failed. The jury found unanimously against LM and awarded the maximum possible damages. So it was not ITN that bankrupted LM. It was LM's lies about the ITN reports that bankrupted themselves, morally and financially.

=== Russian Federation ===
On 8 July 2015, Russia vetoed a UK-drafted resolution at the Security Council that would have declared the Srebrenica massacre was genocide on the 20th anniversary of the atrocity. Russian ambassador Vitaly Churkin said the resolution was "not constructive, confrontational and politically motivated". Russia was the only country at the Council that objected to the resolution.

=== Women and children argument ===
According to the Radislav Krstić appellate judgment:

“The decision not to kill the women or children may be explained by the Bosnian Serbs’ sensitivity to public opinion. In contrast to the killing of the captured military men, such an action could not easily be kept secret, or disguised as a military operation, and so carried an increased risk of attracting international censure… The international attention focused on Srebrenica, combined with the presence of UN troops in the area, prevented those members of the VRS Main Staff who devised the genocidal plan from putting it into action in the most direct and efficient way. Constrained by the circumstances, they adopted the method which would allow them to implement the genocidal design while minimizing the risk of retribution.”

However, many children were executed. The final list of those killed in the Srebrenica genocide includes 694 children.

== Denial by officials ==
=== Serbian officials ===
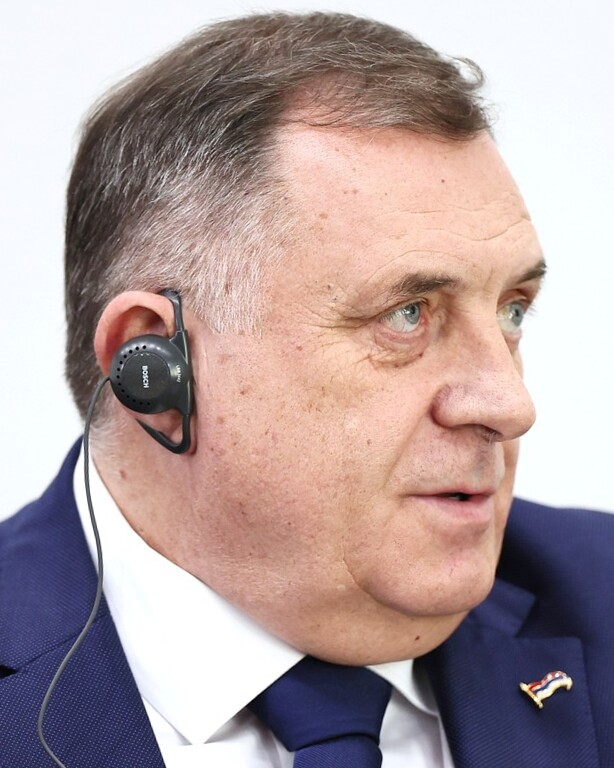
Milorad Dodik, former president of Republika Srpska is among the most prominent politicians to have denied the Bosnian genocide.

High-ranking Serbian officials have said no genocide of Bosniak Muslims took place.

In 2010 and in 2018–19, Milorad Dodik and his Alliance of Independent Social Democrats party (SNSD) attempted to revise the 2004 Srebrenica report. The Humanitarian Law Center criticised these attempts and described them as "the culmination of more than a decade of genocide denial and historical revisionism" by the party's government in Republika Srpska. While President of Republika Srpska, Dodik described the Srebrenica massacre as a "fabricated myth". He stated in an interview with Belgrade newspaper Večernje Novosti in April 2010; "we cannot and will never accept qualifying that event as a genocide". Dodik disowned the 2004 Republika Srpska report that had acknowledged the scale of the killing and which had apologised to the relatives of the victims, saying the report had been adopted because of pressure from the international community. Without substantiating the figure, he said the number of victims was 3,500 rather than the 7,000 accepted by the report, saying 500 listed victims were alive and that over 250 people buried in the Potočari memorial centre had died elsewhere.

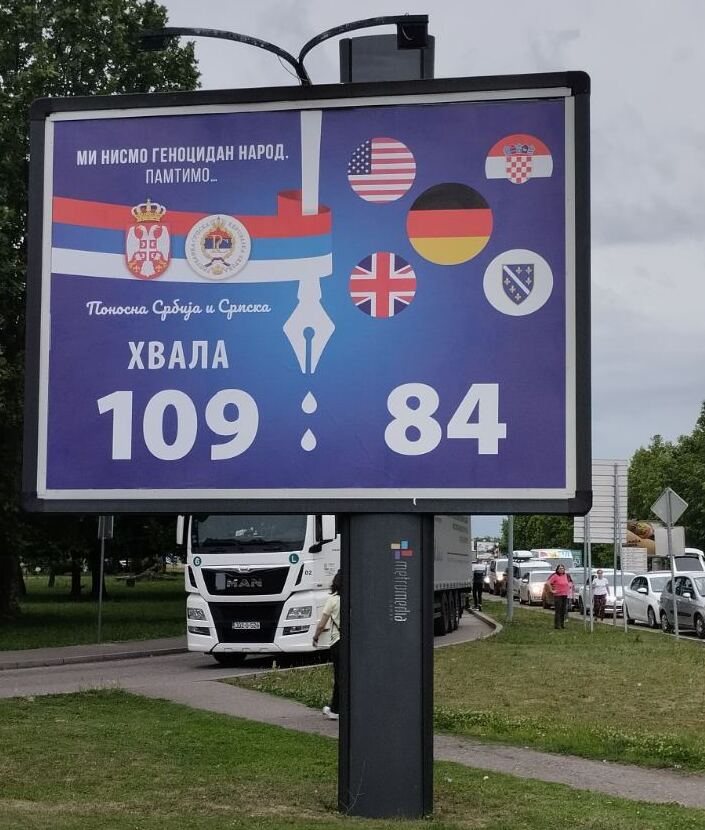
"We are not genocidal people" billboard in Republika Srpska, 2024

In July 2010, on the 15th anniversary of the massacre, Dodik said he did not regard the killings at Srebrenica as genocide, and that; "If a genocide happened then it was committed against Serb people of [eastern Bosnia] where women, children and the elderly were killed en masse". In December 2010, Dodik condemned the Peace Implementation Council, an international community of 55 countries, for referring to the Srebrenica massacre as genocide. In 2017, Dodik introduced legislation that would ban the teaching of the Srebrenica genocide and Siege of Sarajevo in Republika Srpska schools, stating it was "impossible to use here the textbooks ... which say the Serbs have committed genocide and kept Sarajevo under siege. This is not correct and this will not be taught here."

Tomislav Nikolić, President of Serbia, stated on 2 June 2012; "there was no genocide in Srebrenica. In Srebrenica, grave war crimes were committed by some Serbs who should be found, prosecuted and punished ... It is very difficult to indict someone and prove before the court that an event qualifies as genocide."

Miloš Milovanović, a former commander of the Serb paramilitary unit Serbian Guard who represents the Serbian Democratic Party in the Srebrenica Municipal Assembly, said in March 2005: "the massacre is a lie; it is propaganda to paint a bad picture of the Serbian people. The Muslims are lying; they are manipulating the numbers; they are exaggerating what happened. Far more Serbs died at Srebrenica than Muslims."

On 14 November 2018, Ana Brnabić, the Prime Minister of Serbia, said in an interview with Deutsche Welle; "No, I do not think that the terrible massacre at Srebrenica was genocide". Far-right Serbian politician and convicted war criminal Vojislav Šešelj, Ivica Dačić has also denied that the Srebrenica massacre constituted genocide.

=== Former UN officials and military figures ===
Phillip Corwin, former UN Civilian Affairs Coordinator in Bosnia, denied a genocide. He was engaged as an advisor and contributor to the work of the Srebrenica Research Group and said in 2003; "what happened in Srebrenica was not a single large massacre of Muslims by Serbs, but rather a series of very bloody attacks and counterattacks over a three-year period", and that the likely number "of dead Muslims may not be higher than the number of Serbs killed in the Srebrenica area".

In 2009, Lewis MacKenzie, former commander of the United Nations Protection Force (UNPROFOR) in Bosnia, in an article titled "The real story behind Srebrenica", questioned the designation of genocide on the grounds the number of men and boys killed had been exaggerated by a factor of four. According to MacKenzie, 2,000 people had died in battle and 5,000 were considered missing. MacKenzie also said the transfer of the women and children by bus contradicted the notion of genocide—he said the women would have been killed first if there had been an intent to destroy the group.

Retired Portuguese general, Carlos Martins Branco, questioned whether the Bosnian genocide ever happened in his 1998 publications "Was Srebrenica a Hoax? Eyewitness Account of a Former UN Military Observer in Bosnia", and his memoir "A Guerra nos Balcãs, jihadismo, geopolítica e desinformação" (War in the Balkans, Jihadism, Geopolitics, and Disinformation) in November 2016. He wrote; "Srebrenica was portrayed—and continues to be—as a premeditated massacre of innocent Muslim civilians. As a genocide! But was it really so?".

== Denial by other individuals and groups ==
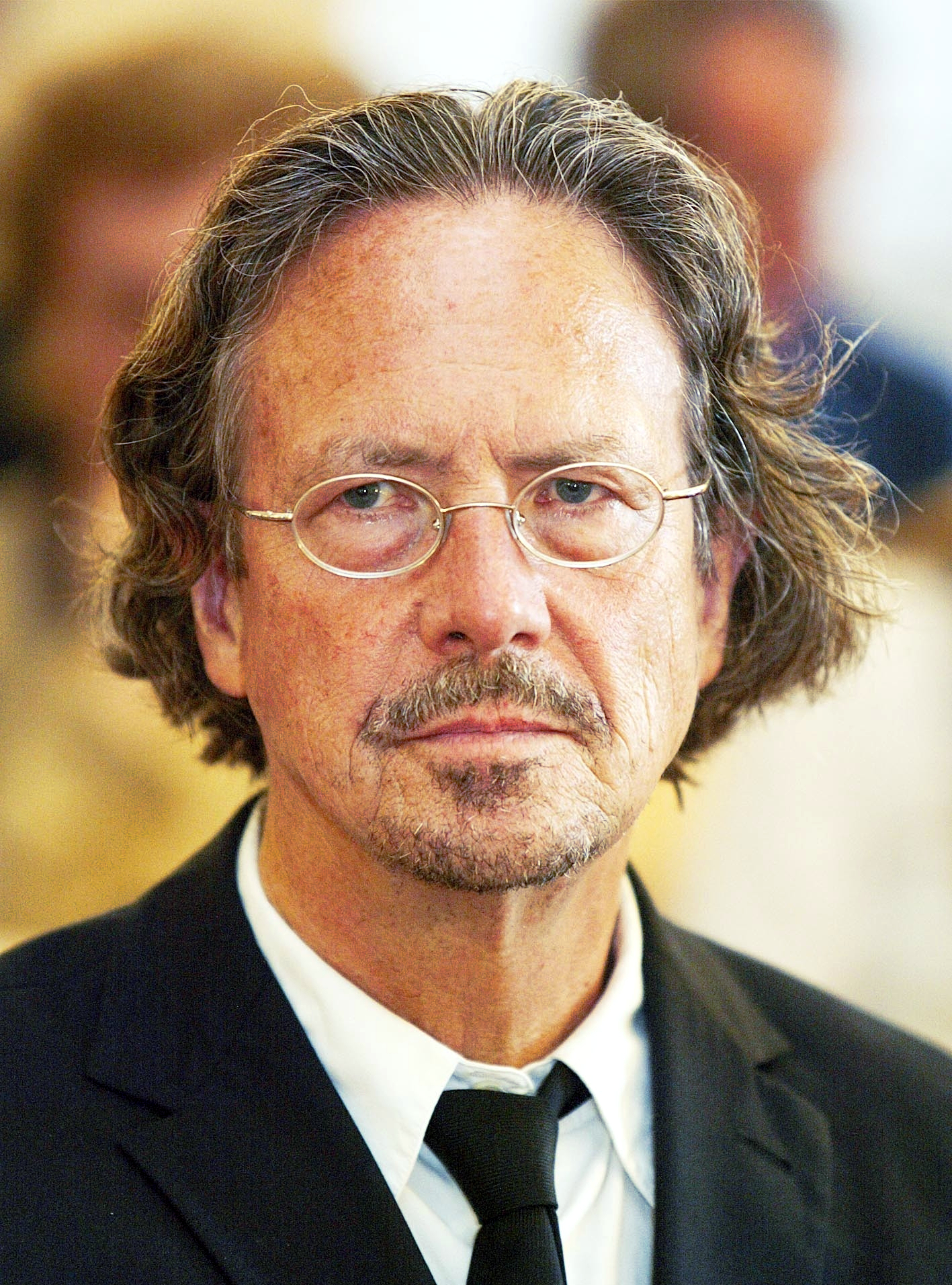
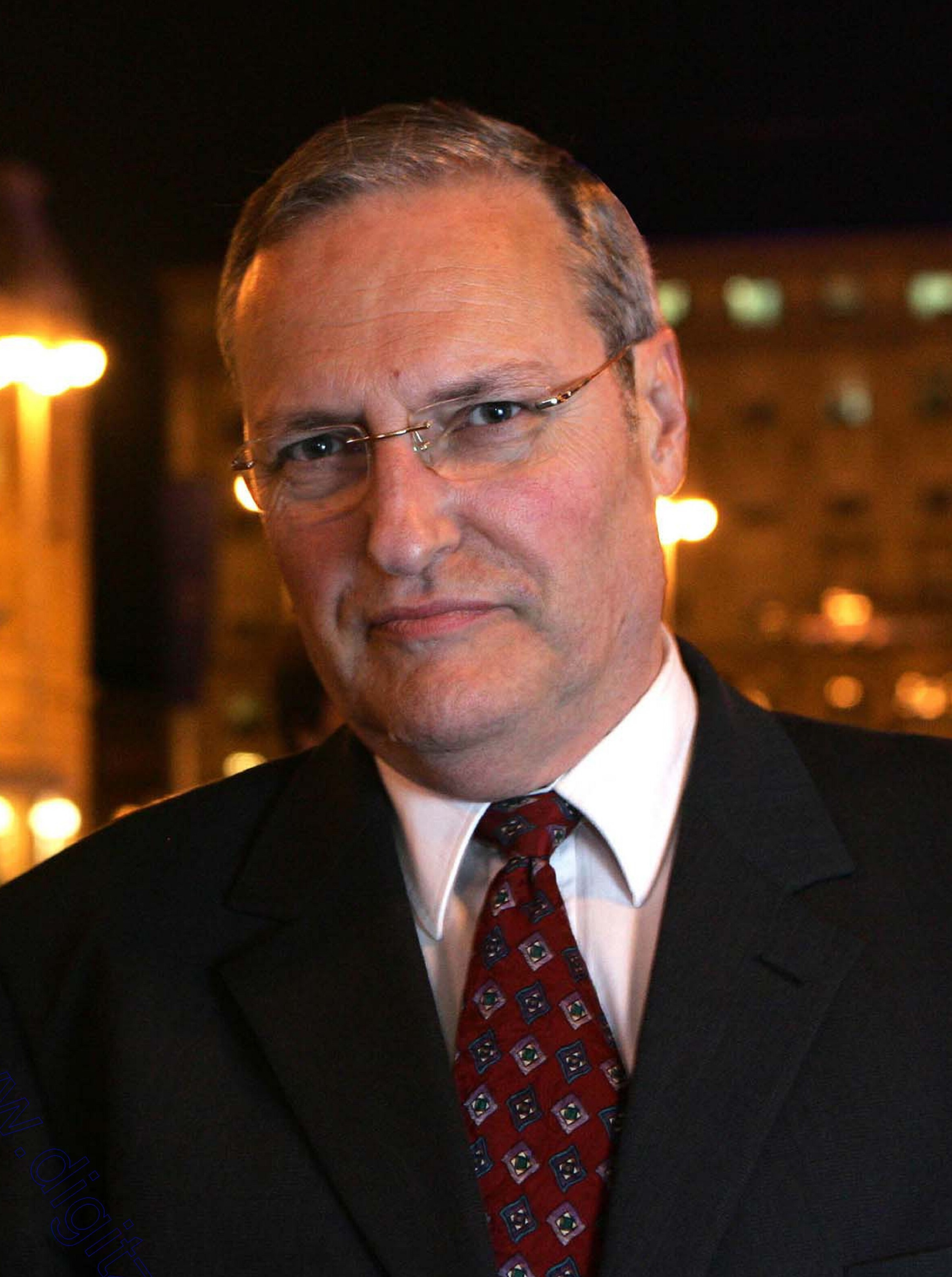
Left: Peter Handke; Right: Efraim Zuroff
The genocide as described and ruled by ICJ and ICTY in numerous convictions, has been denied by various public intellectuals and personalities.

Noam Chomsky drew criticism for not calling the Srebrenica massacre during the Bosnian War a genocide, which he said "cheapens" the word, and for appearing to deny Ed Vulliamy's reporting on the existence of Bosnian concentration camps. The subsequent editorial correction of his comments, which was viewed as a capitulation, was criticized by multiple Balkan watchers, including Marko Hoare, who elaborated on Chomsky's position in his essay "Chomsky's Genocidal Denial", which was published on 17 December 2005.

Austrian writer Peter Handke, who received the Nobel Prize in Literature in 2019, offered to testify on behalf of Slobodan Milošević at ICTY trials. Handke denied Serb-run concentration camps and the Srebrenica massacre, and repeated the myth that Bosnian Muslims staged massacres in Sarajevo. Handke wrote essays, plays and books about the subject, such as A Journey to the Rivers: Justice for Serbia. Handke lauded Milošević and attended his trial and funeral. According to British journalist Ed Vulliamy: "[Handke] went out of his way to give credence to mass murder and, in this context, as importantly, to lies". Handke reacted to these criticisms by threatening to withdraw his play about the Bosnian War, The Journey To The Dug-Out, Or The Play About The War Film, from Vienna's Burgtheater unless media and peer criticism stopped.

Serbian-American politician and historian Srđa Trifković, criticised a video that was captured by the Scorpions, paramilitary units of the Serbian Ministry of Internal Affairs, who filmed themselves executing six Bosniak teenagers in woodland near Srebrenica. Trifković called the video a "manipulation", saying it was produced to retroactively justify Western policies and actions in Bosnia. According to Trifković, their aim, was to "inflict a collective responsibility upon the Serbian people", revise the Dayton Agreement, and abolish Republika Srpska. Trifković has also denied evidence of genocide, and of the number of people killed in Srebrenica; and that the Scorpions were under the control of Serbian officials and institutions.

Darko Trifunović, who teaches at the Faculty of Security in Novi Sad and helped write a Srebrenica report, said fewer than 100 people were killed at Srebrenica, and denied the validity of the genocide verdict passed by the ICJ in the case against Serbia. He also denied the validity of ICTY's verdict the Srebrenica massacre was genocide in the case against Radislav Krstić. According to Trifunović, there was "Islamic radicalism" and "terrorism" in Bosnia-Herzegovina, and used this statement to justify his denial of the validity of court verdicts.

La Nation, a bi-monthly Swiss newspaper, published a series of articles saying 2,000 soldiers were killed in the "pseudo-massacre" in Srebrenica. The Society for Threatened Peoples and Swiss Association Against Impunity filed a joint suit against La Nation for genocide denial, which is prohibited by Swiss law.

The Srebrenica Research Group, which was led by Edward S. Herman and included two former UN officials, published Srebrenica And the Politics of War Crimes (2005), which said the "contention that as many as 8,000 Muslims were killed has no basis in available evidence and is essentially a political construct".

Genocide scholar William Schabas in his 2009 book Genocide in International Law: The Crime of Crimes summarised the legal opinions of the status of the atrocities committed in Srebrenica and throughout the Bosnian War, calling them ethnic cleansing and not genocide. According to Schabas; "Ethnic cleansing is also a warning sign of genocide to come. Genocide is the last resort of the frustrated ethnic cleanser".

Efraim Zuroff, director of the Simon Wiesenthal Center office in Israel, said; "genocide is an attempt to completely erase one nation [so] ... there was no genocide in [Bosnia-Herzegovina]", and that the Srebrenica massacre could not have been genocide because Serb forces had separated men from children and women. Zuroff welcomed the life sentence given by the ICTY to Ratko Mladić in November 2017 but said the Srebrenica massacre was not genocide. Menachem Rosensaft, who in 2015 clashed with Zuroff over his remarks, dismissed Zuroff's response to the Mladić verdict, calling those who did not consider the Srebrenica massacre genocide incorrect from a legal viewpoint.

Norwegian war correspondent Ola Flyum released the documentaries A Town Betrayed (Norwegian: Byen som kunne ofres) and Sporene etter Sarajevo ("The Remnants of Sarajevo"), in 2010, provoking heated debate in Norway. The documentaries were first broadcast as part of the television series Brennpunkt by the state broadcaster NRK; five months later, the Norwegian Press Complaints Commission condemned A Town Betrayed for "violation of good press practice" following a complaint by the Norwegian Helsinki Committee. Flyum said he wanted to nuance the picture of Srebrenica by also discussing earlier brutalities perpetrated by Naser Orić in the neighbouring villages. The documentary did not engage in outright genocide denial but construed the massacre as something more spontaneous and chaotic than a calculated action by Serb forces. Flyum also tried to shift the blame from Mladić and Karadžić to Izetbegović and Orić, saying Srebrenica was a strategic sacrifice rather than a planned ethnic cleansing. The decision not exclude the ICTY's final verdicts in the documentary was vehemently criticized, in particular by Mirsad Fazlic, the Bosnian reporter of Slobodna Bosna whom Flyum had interviewed for the film and had worked with for four years.

In 2012, Russian lawyer and opposition politician Mark Feygin who served as a volunteer sniper in the Army of Republika Srpska gave an interview where he stated that the ethnic cleansing campaigns committed in Bosnia by Serbian forces were "mutual mass murders" and said that Ratko Mladić was not involved in the organization of the Srebrenica massacre. Mladić was found guilty of committing war crimes and crimes against humanity (including the massacre in Srebrenica), by the International Criminal Tribunal for the former Yugoslavia (ICTY).

According to Israeli historian Yehuda Bauer, the Srebrenica massacre was an "act of mass murder, but not genocide". Israeli historian Gideon Greif headed a commission that in July 2021 issued a report saying the Srebrenica massacre did not constitute genocide. The report cast Bosniaks as aggressors before the events of Srebrenica, and Bosnian Serbs as victims prior to 1995.

In a review of the film The Weight of Chains written by Tristan Miller of the Socialist Party of Great Britain Miller says that the film presents the Srebrenica massacre as a "stage-managed ploy by the Bosnians and Americans to justify NATO military intervention against Serbia". Within the film, interviewee Srđa Trifković asserts that there are "trustworthy witnesses" who claim that Bill Clinton had indicated that "5,000 dead Muslims would be the price of NATO intervention" and that these witnesses believe that "Srebrenica was deliberately sacrificed by Izetbegović in order to provide this burnt offering to the White House". Miller writes that the film presents the Srebrenica "civilian death toll as no larger than the number of Serbs killed in the surrounding area".

=== Reactions ===
Menachem Z. Rosensaft publicly confronted Efraim Zuroff, who said the Srebrenica massacre did not constitute genocide, saying for Zuroff to be able to condemn the perpetrators and mourn victims of the genocide Jewish people suffered during the World War II, he has to condemn the perpetrators and mourn the victims of all acts of genocide, including the Srebrenica massacre. He also responded to denialists' arguments, particularly those made by Steven T. Katz, William Schabas, and Zuroff, in an essay titled "Ratko Mladić's Genocide Conviction, and Why it Matters", which was published by Tablet Magazine on the day the ICTY found Ratko Mladić guilty of "genocide, extermination, murder, and other crimes against humanity and war crimes", and sentenced him to life imprisonment. According to Rosensaft: "It is unconscionable and reprehensible for anyone to tell Adisada that the horrors to which her fellow Bosnian Muslims—including quite possibly members of her own family—were subjected at Srebrenica did not constitute a genocide".

To one of the denialists' arguments—number, intent, and the combination of these depending on occasion and context—Rosensaft said the ICTY's Krstić Appeals Chamber "unequivocally held that the number of victims was not a determinative factor in concluding whether or not a genocide had occurred", and that the Trial Chamber concluded "the Srebrenica massacre was indeed a genocide because it was an essential element of the intent to destroy the Muslim population of Eastern Bosnia as a whole". Rosensaft said Nehemiah Robinson, the Director of the Institute of Jewish Affairs of the World Jewish Congress, and a leading authority on the UN Genocide Convention, the term "genocide" "applies even if victims constitute only part of a group either within a country or within a region or within a single community, provided the number is substantial ... it will be up to the courts to decide in each case whether the number was sufficiently large". Rosenssaft added; "the courts have spoken clearly and unambiguously".

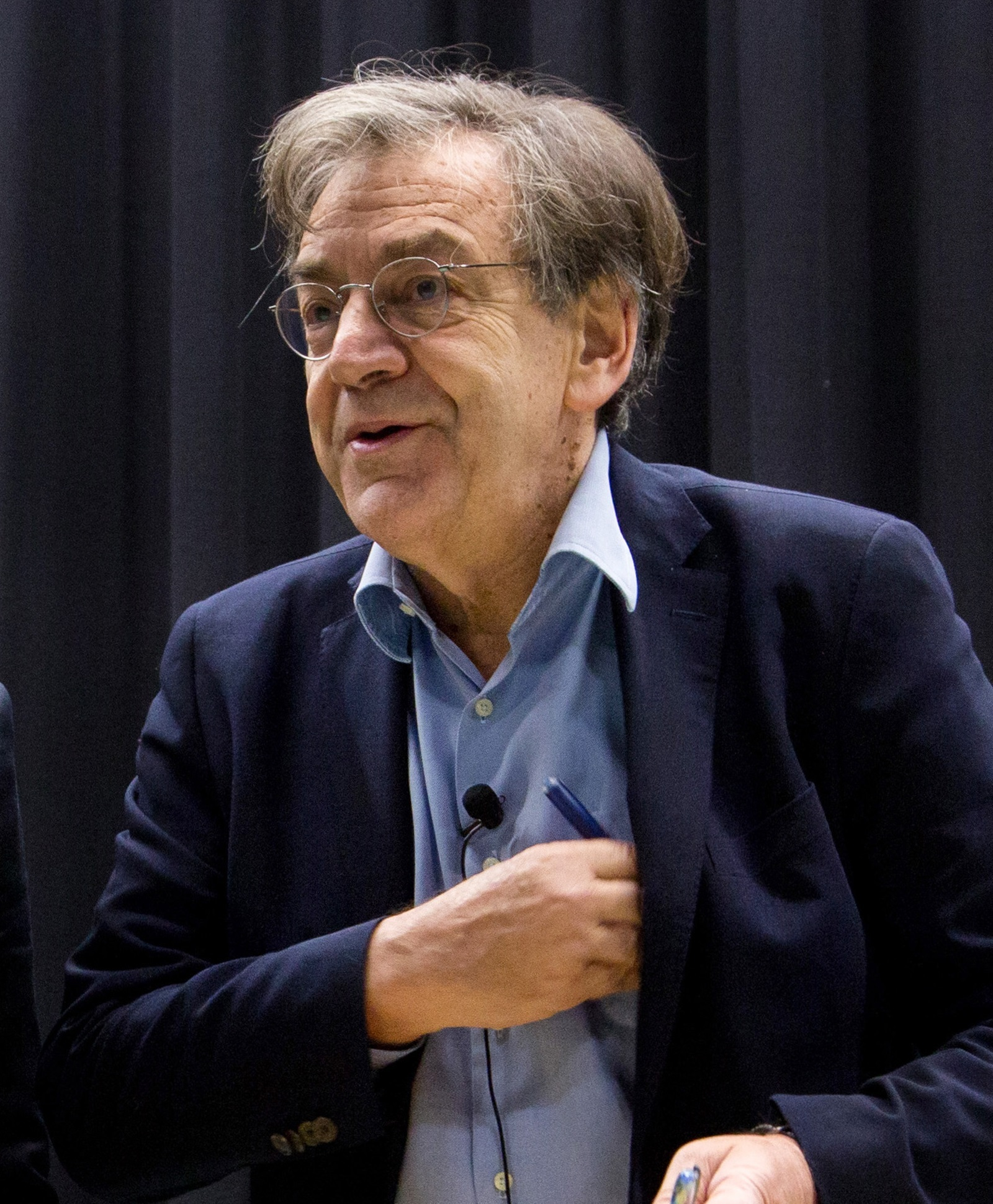
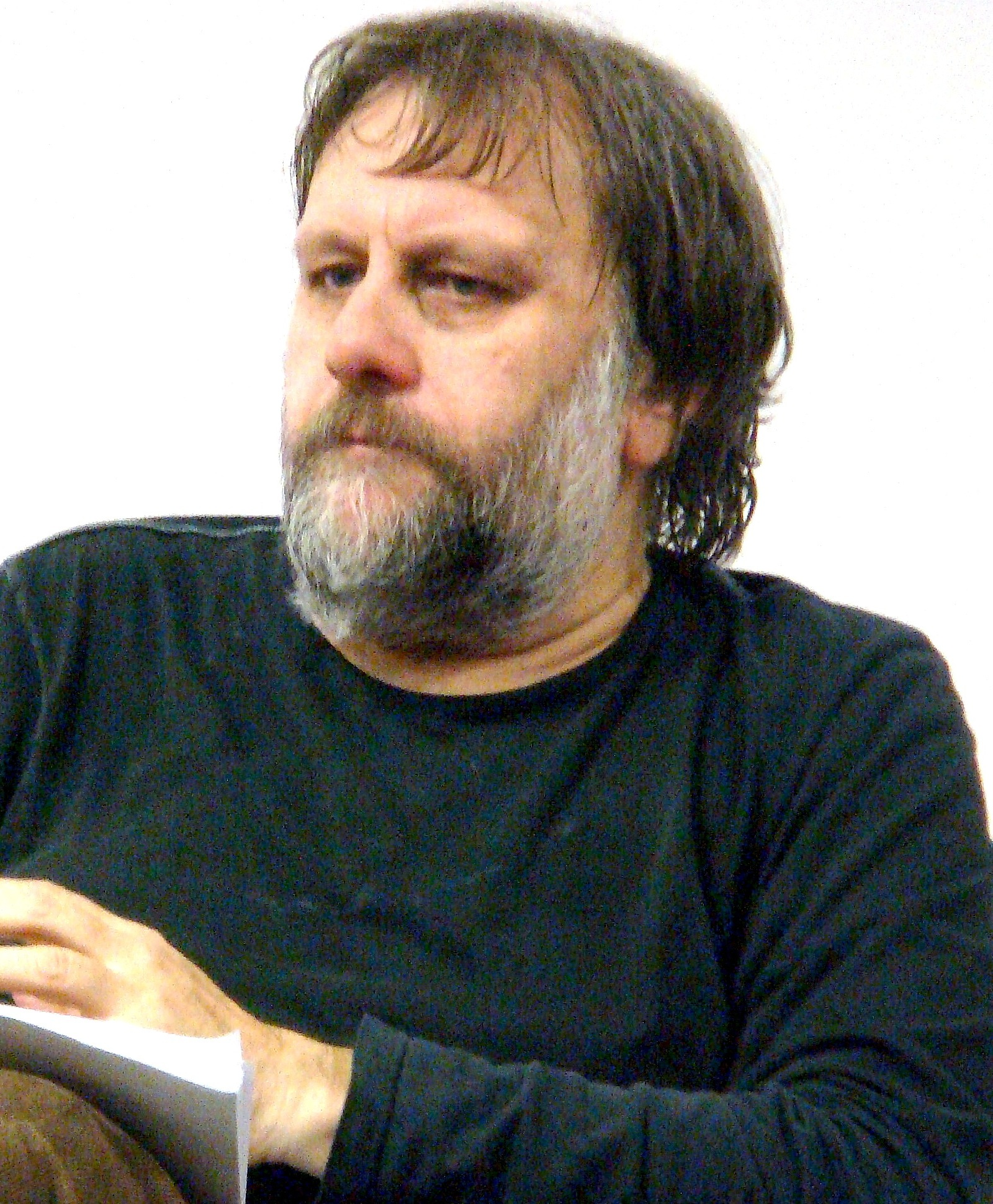
Left: Alain Finkielkraut; Right: Slavoj Žižek. Various public intellectuals and personalities reacted to Handke's denial.

In a Globe and Mail article on 7 May 1999, British author Salman Rushdie, described Handke's denial of genocide and apologias for Serbian Milošević's government as "idiocy". After Handke's play "Voyage by Dugout" was staged, Susan Sontag called him "finished" in New York. Other noted reactions included Alain Finkielkraut, who said Handke had become "an ideological monster", while according to Slavoj Žižek, Handke's "glorification of the Serbs is cynicism".

Bosnian-American novelist and lecturer of creative writing at Princeton University, Aleksandar Hemon criticised the Nobel Committee's decision to award Handke a Nobel Prize in Literature, in a piece in The New York Times on 15 October 2019, for their Opinion column, calling Handke the "Bob Dylan of genocide apologists", while the Berlin-based Serbian novelist, Bora Ćosić, wrote:

This writer, the Austrian, has his very personal style. The very worst crimes get mentioned rather sweetly. And so the reader completely forgets that we're dealing with crimes. The Austrian writer who visited my country found only very proud people there. They proudly put up with everything that happened to them, so much so that in their pride they didn't bother to ask why all this was happening to them.

While defending Handke, German novelist Martin Walser described the mood surrounding Handke, in relation to his opinions and attitude toward Bosnian Muslims' plight, said Handke "is just being completely dismissed, in every respect morally, politically and professionally", and that all is "part of the war mood which I find a bit frightening".

== See also ==
- Genocide denial
- Historical revisionism
- Historical negationism
- Far-right politics in Serbia

== Readings and presentations ==
- Campbell, David Atrocity, memory, photography: imaging the concentration camps of Bosnia, two part series of detailed presentation of the case of ITN versus Living Marxism, by David Campbell, Professor of International Politics at the University of Newcastle, first published in Journal of Human Rights, March & June 2002.
- SREBRENICA - Genocid u osam činova / Genocide in eight acts, SENSE News Agency, an online presentation (presentation contains material that some viewers may find disturbing)
- Srebrenica – a 'Safe haven', Netherlands Institute for War, Holocaust and Genocide Studies, an extensive Dutch government report on events in eastern Bosnia and the fall of Srebrenica.
- Leydesdorff, Selma Surviving the Bosnian Genocide: The Women of Srebrenica Speak , translation by Kay Richardson. Bloomington: Indiana University Press, 2011.
- Lehrman, Sally Missing No Longer – International commission forges ahead to identify genocide victims (Archived old portal), Scientific American, 1 September 2006 (1 August 2006)
- Cohen, Nick Decline and fall of the puppetmasters, The Guardian, 16 July 2011

== Sources ==
- Hanson Green, Monica (May 2020). Sokolović, Mirnes; et al. (eds.). "Srebrenica Genocide Denial Report" (html, PDF). Izvještaj o negiranju genocida (2020). Translated by Hasan Hasanović. Srebrenica: Memorijalni centar Srebrenica.
- Vučić, Nikola; et al. (2022). Hanson-Green, Monica; Pećanin, Senad (eds.). "Srebrenica Genocide Denial Report" (html, PDF). Izvještaj o negiranju genocida (2022). Translated by Hasan Hasanović. Srebrenica: Memorijalni centar Srebrenica.
- Vučić, Nikola; et al. (July 2023). Hanson-Green, Monica; et al. (eds.). "Srebrenica Genocide Denial Report" (html, PDF). Izvještaj o negiranju genocida (2023). Translated by Monica Hanson-Green. Srebrenica: Memorijalni centar Srebrenica.
- Zrinjski, Katarina; et al. (2024). Maljević, Almir (ed.). "(Ne)procesuiranje negatora genocida" (PDF). Izvještaj o negiranju genocida (2024). Translated by Monica Hanson Green. Srebrenica: Memorijalni centar Srebrenica.
- Bursać, Dragan; et al. (July 2025). Ikanović, Edin (ed.). "Srebrenica Genocide Denial Report" (html, PDF). Izvještaj o negiranju genocida (2025). Translated by Monica Hanson Green. Srebrenica: Memorijalni centar Srebrenica.
