= A Town Betrayed =

- Country of origin: Norway
- Original language: Norwegian
- No. of episodes: 1

Production
- Running time: 58 minutes

Original release
- Network: NRK
- Release: 26 April 2011

A Town Betrayed (Norwegian: Byen som kunne ofres, Croatian: Grad koji se mogao žrtvovati, Izdani grad) is a 2010 Norwegian documentary about the prelude of the Srebrenica massacre (1995), written and directed by journalists Ola Flyum and David Hebditch and produced by Fenris Films, NRK, among others. It was shown on NRK's Brennpunkt on 26 April 2011 and SVT on 28 August 2011.

The film was described by director Ola Flyum in an April 26, 2011 Dagsavisen interview as follows:

Many consider Srebrenica to be a new Holocaust in Europe, where 8000 were executed. In reality, it was a part of the exhaustive hostilities. We show how Mladic operates as a general seeking to take control of a region. The city is evacuated, roughly 15,000 men have fled, en route to Muslim lines through Serbian regions. None know how many were armed. For us, it appears to have been an extremely chaotic situation, not a planned ethnic cleansing.

The documentary has received significant criticism from journalist associations, the Norwegian Helsinki Committee, and the foreign minister of Bosnia-Hercegovina. The Norwegian Helsinki Committee filed a complaint with the Norwegian Press Complaints Commission (PFU). NRK and Fenris Film received criticism after the PFU handled the case at a meeting in Lillehammer on October 20, 2011, and found that the film violated point 3.2 of the Ethical Code of Practice for the Norwegian Press regarding citing sources. The PFU concluded that:

In the opinion of the committee, the film overlooks or downplays some basic facts regarding the retelling of the story in Bosnia. In particular, the committee finds it journalistically unacceptable that the program does not mention the sentencing of the war crime hearings at The Hague, the ICJ, and the ICTY. Court proceedings have, after a review of the comprehensive evidence, maintained that there existed a plan to cleanse the country for non-Serbs, a plan that, according to the judgments, culminated in the massacre at Srebrenica, perhaps one of the best documented genocides in history, with more than 8000 killed. Several controversial sources can be found win the program, without their claims being weighed against conclusions from the trial proceedings that these sources in practice argue against.
