= Divide and Rule: The Partition of Africa, 1880–1914 =

History book by Henk Wesseling

- Dutch language original cover, Verdeel en heers. De deling van Afrika, 1880–1914 (1991)
- Author: Henk Wesseling
- Original title: Verdeel en heers. De deling van Afrika, 1880–1914
- Language: Dutch
- Genre: History
- Publisher: Bert Bakker
- Publication date: 1991

Divide and Rule: The Partition of Africa, 1880–1914 (Dutch: Verdeel en heers. De deling van Afrika, 1880–1914), is a history book by Dutch historian Henk Wesseling, published by Bert Bakker 1991. As the title suggests, the books deals with the European partition and colonisation of Africa.

In the preface to Divide and Rule, Wesseling writes that his interest in the history of the partition of Africa arose in 1971-72, when he, as a visiting fellow at École pratique des hautes études, in Paris attended a seminar led by Henri Brunschwig. Ten years later, Wesseling was a visiting fellow at the Institute for Advanced Study in Princeton, New Jersey, there he decided to write a book on the subject. During his tenure in Princeton, he began his research for the book, but upon returning to Leiden University, in the Netherlands, Wesseling procrastinated from working on the book, and instead devoted his time to teaching and other projects. It was not until several years later, after encouragement from Mai Spijkers, an editor at Bert Bakker publishing imprint, that Wesseling finished the book. In April 1991, the book was published in Dutch (an English translation, by Arnold J. Pomerans, was published in 1997 by Praeger, an imprint of Greenwood Publishing Group). Six months later, Thomas Pakenham's book on the same subject called The Scramble for Africa was published.

== Synopsis ==
Divide and Rule is divided into seven chapters, each dealing with a different part of Africa. They are arranged chronology, starting with the occupation of Tunisia and Egypt, 1881–1882, and ending with the partition of Morocco 1905-1912. Wesseling primarily pays attention to the empire builders rather than to their subjects: 'the decisions and reflections of Europeans take the central place in this book' (p, 18). The author explains the partition of Africa in terms of a complex, multi-faceted causality. As for the wider impact of European colonization on Africa, Wesseling differs from earlier authors such as Allan McPhee (The Economic Revolution in British West Africa [1926, repr. 1971, with a preface by Anthony G. Hopkins, a leading economic historian]). As Wesseling sees it, 'in the economic and social fields, colonisation did not create anything essentially new, but merely occasioned an acceleration of a social and economic modernisation process which had already begun' (p. 460) . It is an interpretation with which Lewis Gann strongly disagrees, but which is shared by such major African historians as J.E.A. Ajayi, who stresses the episodic character of European colonialism in African history. By contrast, Wesseling stresses the political impact of western conquest on Africa: 'the partition of Africa entailed for the existing African states the loss of their sovereignty.' Africans regained their sovereignty as a result of decolonization, but it was not the pre-colonial kingdoms and commonwealths that were restored - the new African rulers took over, for the most part, the frontiers created by the western conquerors.

Written from the perspective of European imperial historians, Wesseling's study focuses on those European individuals, their motives, actions and tactics in Africa between 1880 and 1914. Simultaneously, the author examines in detail the various treaties and agreements entered by European nations resulting from their scramble for territory in Africa. A key argument in the book is that while the partition was an important event for African people, it was of marginal importance to Europe.

=== Chapters ===
- I: The Eastern Question: the Occupation of Tunisia and Egypt, 1881–1882
- II: The Congo and the Creation of the Free State, 1882–1885
- III: Cool and Courageous: Germany and Great Britain in East Africa, 1885–1890
- IV: Soldiers and Traders: France and Great Britain in West Africa, 1890–1898
- V: The Long March to Fashoda, 1893–1898
- VI: Boers and Britons in South Africa, 1890–1902
- VII: Epilogue: the Partition of Morocco, 1905–1912

== Critical reception ==
In The International History Review, L. H. Gann called Divide and Rule, a "monumental work"
