= Anatomy of Gray =

Play by Jim Leonard Jr

- Written by: Jim Leonard Jr.
- Original language: English
- Genre: Drama
- Setting: Gray, Indiana. 1880

Premiere

Anatomy of Gray is a play by Jim Leonard Jr., about a grieving young woman and the mysterious plague set upon her small Indiana town after the arrival of a strange and charismatic doctor.

In releases of the script, Jim Leonard dedicates the play to his late friend John Geter, a victim of the AIDS epidemic and the originator of Buddy Layman in another play of his, The Diviners. At the same time, Dr. Henry I. Schvey, an academic with extensive experience in American drama, arrives at the Circle Repertory Theatre looking to commission a play to celebrate the centennial of Washington University's medical school. Leonard, needing the money, took up the offer despite not knowing what to write about. Ultimately, he derives his idea from the timely epidemic -- "what would happen if only the Christians got AIDS?"—and would go on to write and rewrite the script (originally titled Gray's Anatomy) in multiple instances, working on it for over two and a half years before putting it away for a decade, deeply dissatisfied with the outcome of the story. Years down the line, when he has a dream about John, he is urged by Craig Slaight—an A.C.T. representative—to write it, creating the final publication of Anatomy of Gray.

== Plot synopsis ==
June Muldoon—a young girl of 15—addresses the audience, explaining that she may be among the most "interesting people you will ever meet", which is overshadowed by her residence in the town of Gray, Indiana, "the most boring place in the world." Various members of the cast enter and share their life experiences within Gray before June explains that the play chronicles her story, beginning "chapter one".

The play then shifts to the funeral service of Adam Muldoon, June's late father and dedicated town farmer. Feeling immense grief at her father's loss and her mother's endless sorrow, June writes a letter to God in which she wishes for her town to receive a doctor, so that "nobody will ever die again." Soon after, a massive storm and tornado causes a man in a balloon to crash near the town. He is rescued by June, who nearly drowns before he performs life-saving CPR. He is revealed to be a doctor named Galen P. Gray, a fact which June is immensely excited by.

The townspeople, now with a relatively qualified—and good looking—doctor, start seeing him for all of their ailments, both self-induced and not. Despite Gray's ironic aversion to blood and a tendency to pass out at the sight of it, he is quite helpful, issuing several diagnoses of their ailments and astounding the townspeople—all but Pastor Phineas Wingfield, who distrusts his methods and believes his profession to be "devilish".

June develops a crush on Gray and takes it upon herself to be his personal assistant. In the meantime, Gray falls in love with Rebekah Muldoon, June's mother, who is pregnant with her late husband's daughter. After discovering him in the town's graveyard saying Kaddish, Rebekah begs Gray for an abortion, but he refuses, liking her and her child too much to be able to bring himself to do it.

Gray begins to notice strange marks on certain townspeople, and soon those who are "marked" start becoming ill and dying. Over time, the sickness begins to worsen, and the majority of the population of Gray begin to die. Blaming the doctor for the appearance of the plague, Pastor Wingfield and a mob of other citizens attempt to chase Gray out of the town, but are stopped by June and the fact that the Pastor is suffering severely from kidney stones. Under Galen's instruction, June manages to operate on the Pastor and save his life, causing the townspeople to soften up to the doctor.

Meanwhile, Rebekah gives birth to her baby, who is unmarked. Rebekah, who has promised her newborn daughter to Galen, urges him to name her himself, as she "cannot love her any more than she already does". When Galen and the townspeople decide to send those unmarked across the river to the outside world, he passes the baby on to June, who names her simply "Sister". As the few who are not "marked" float away on the raft, the doctor comes to the conclusion that the illness is likely caused by contaminated water, remarking that he always boils his water, June mimics him in all aspects including his water-boiling habits, and Homer—a simple-minded boy with a crush on June—doesn't drink water (preferring soda pop, a running gag in the play). The play ends at its beginning as June explains to the audience that she wrote down her history to tell to her little sister once she was old enough to understand it.
