= Bernard Arps =

Professor of Indonesian and Javanese language and culture

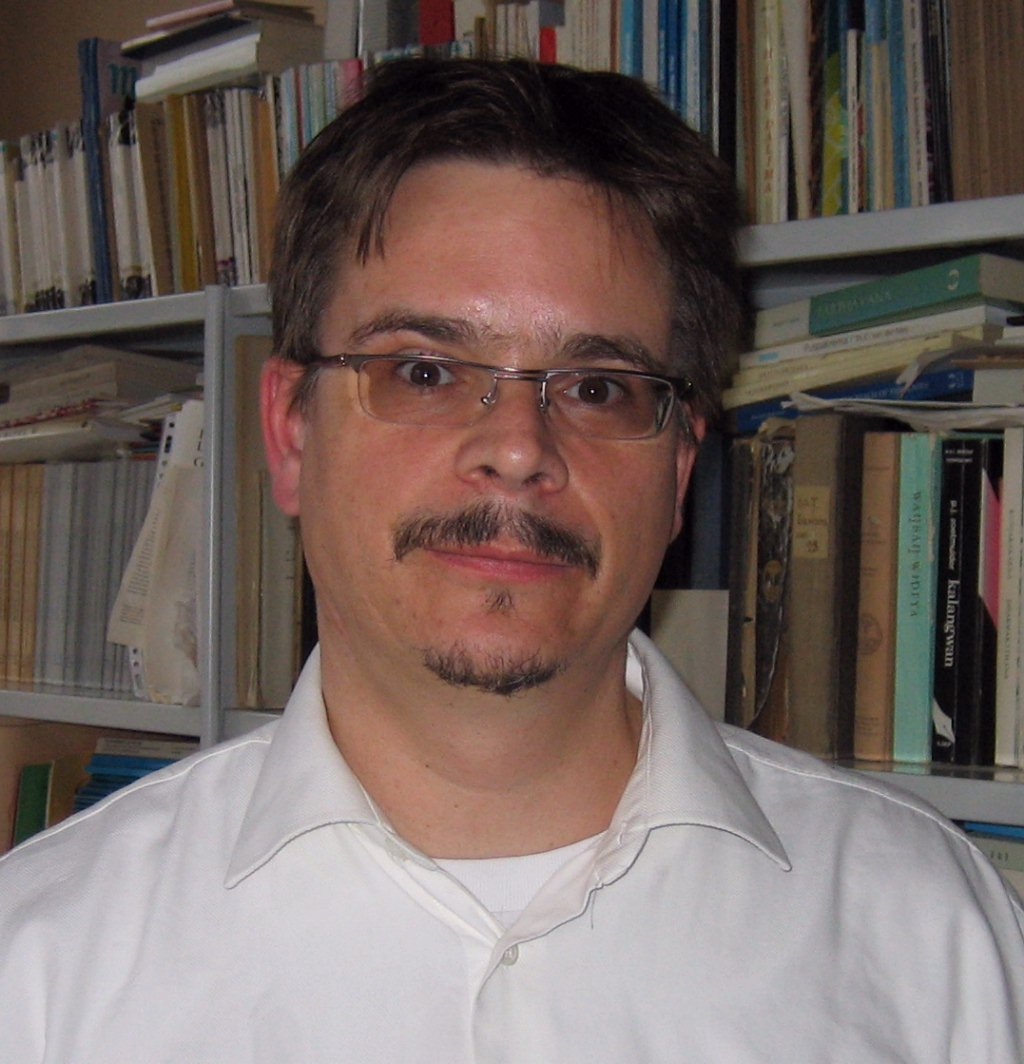
- Born: 30 May 1961 (age 64); Leiden
- Occupation: Professor of Indonesian and Javanese Language and Culture
- Language: Indonesian language
- Nationality: Dutch
- Citizenship: Netherlands
- Genre: Indonesian and Javanese Language and Culture
- Subject: Anthropology
- Notable works: Golden letters: writing traditions of Indonesia(1991)

Bernard Arps, Professor of Indonesian and Javanese Language and Culture at Leiden University, Netherlands, was born in 1961 in Leiden.

== Biography ==
Arps teaches in the Department of Languages and Cultures of Indonesia at Leiden University. He also chaired this department in the years 1995, 1999–2000, and 2003–2006. Earlier, he was a lecturer in Indonesian and Javanese at the School of Oriental and African Studies, University of London from 1988 to 1993. He also served as Fellow-in-Residence at the Netherlands Institute for Advanced Study in the Humanities and Social Sciences in 2001–02, a visiting fellow in the Faculty of Asian Studies and the Humanities Research Centre at the Australian National University during the first half of 2005, and the Netherlands Visiting professor of Asian Languages and Cultures at the University of Michigan in 2006–07.

Arps wrote his thesis in 1992, entitled Tembang in Two Traditions. Performance and Interpretation of Javanese Literature.

Arps, in association with Annabel Teh Gallop, produced a bilingual photographic catalogue of Indonesian manuscripts, "Golden letters: writing traditions of Indonesia" ("Surat Emas: Budaya Tulis di Indonesia" in Indonesian).

Since 1979 Arps spent four years on fieldwork in Indonesia, in the regions of Surakarta and Yogyakarta in central Java, Banyuwangi on the eastern tip of the island, and Cilacap on the south coast. He has also edited works on performance and texts, and articles on Javanese and Indonesian dramatic, literary, religious, scholarly, and media discourse.

== Publications ==
- Arps, Bernard (1986). Sekar ageng : over antieke Javaanse versvormen (in Dutch). Leiden. OCLC 65115823.
- Arps, Bernard (1990). Papers presented at the Conference on Java and the Java Sea, Rijksuniversiteit te Leiden. Leiden. OCLC 65569551.
- Arps, Bernard (1990). Yusup, Sri Tanjung and fragrant water : the spread of a popular Islamic poem in Banyuwangi, East Java. OCLC 68236660.
- Arps, Bernard (1990). Dewa ruci : wayang op de radio (in Dutch). Netherlands. OCLC 417462340.
- Arps, Bernard (1991). Golden letters : writing traditions of Indonesia [Surat Emas: Budaya Tulis di Indonesia] (in English and Indonesian). London: British Library. ISBN 978-979-8083-06-8. OCLC 24918006.
- Arps, Bernard (1991). Pengkajian bahasa dan sastra Jawa di Britania Raya : sejarah dan keadaan sekarang (in Indonesian). Semarang: Kongres Bahasa Jawa. OCLC 65821732.
- Arps, Bernard (1992). Tembang in two traditions : performance and interpretation of Javanese literature. London: School of Oriental and African Studies, University of London. OCLC 31865705.
- Arps, Bernard (1993). Performance in Java and Bali : studies of narrative, theatre, music, and dance. London: School of Oriental and African Studies, University of London. ISBN 978-0-7286-0217-5. OCLC 28925372.
- Arps, Bernard (1994). Serat lokapali kawi : an eighteenth-century manuscript of the Old Javanese Arjunawijaya (in Javanese and English). Leiden: Leiden University. ISBN 978-90-73006-04-1. OCLC 36102938.
- Arps, Bernard (1994). Traditionele en moderne poëzie van Indonesië (in Dutch). Leiden: Instituut Indonesische Cursussen. ISBN 978-90-72654-12-0. OCLC 33972585.
- Arps, Bernard (1994). Poetic performance and the lure of music : Javanese literature on audio cassette. Leiden: Workshop KITLV. OCLC 69261246.
- Arps, Bernard (1995). Historical atlas of South-East Asia. Leiden, New York: Köln: E.J. Brill. ISBN 978-90-04-10238-5. OCLC 489759077.
- Arps, Bernard (1998). Review of Performance in Java and Bali. Studies of Narrative, Theatre, Music and Dance. Journal of Southeast Asian Studies. ISSN 0022-4634. OCLC 478618027.
- Arps, Bernard (2000). Woord en schrift in de Oost : de betekenis van zending en missie voor de studie van taal en literatuur in Zuidoost-Azië (in Dutch). Leiden: Universiteit Leiden. ISBN 978-90-74956-23-9. OCLC 46480063.
- Arps, Bernard (2002). Letters on air in Banyuwangi. Leiden: Royal Institute of Linguistics and Anthropology. OCLC 67039023.
- Arps, Bernard (2003). "I'm an Osing Kid": music and the ambience of Banyuwangi. Leiden: KITLV. OCLC 743007411.
