= Saskia De Coster =

Belgian writer

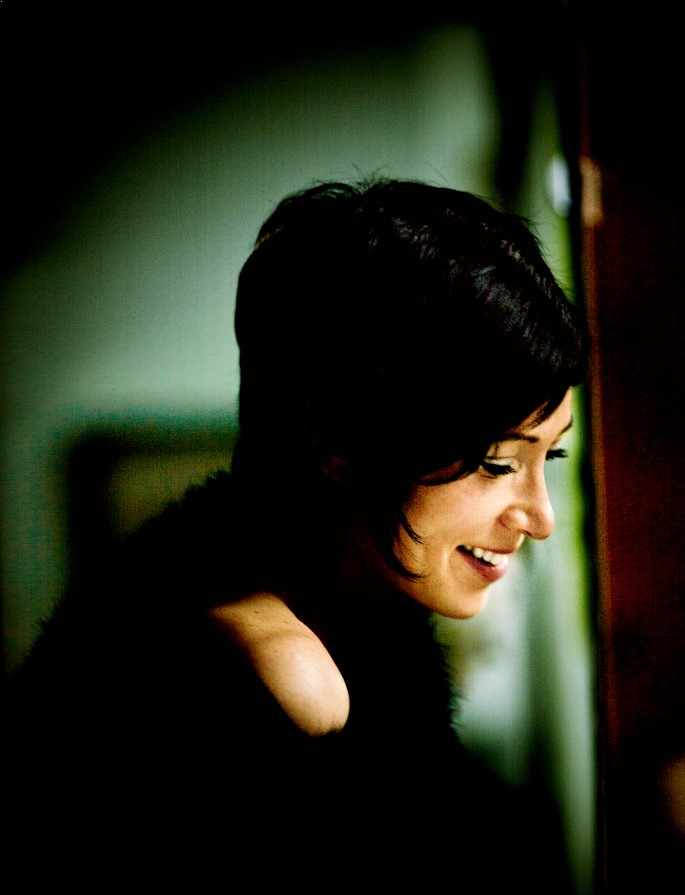
- Saskia De Coster, September 2006
- Born: 1976 (age 49–50)
- Education: Katholieke Universiteit Leuven
- Occupation: Writer
- Writing career
- Language: Dutch
- Notable awards: Cutting Edge Award

Saskia De Coster (born 1976) is a Belgian writer. She has published sixteen books as of 29 Jan 2022.

== Biography ==
Saskia De Coster was born in 1976. She began writing when she was two. When she was eleven, she won a national story contest and was awarded the title of "Junior Journalist."

De Coster studied Germanic languages at the Katholieke Universiteit Leuven, between 1994 and 1998. In 1998, she received a master's degree in literary studies at the same university.

== Work ==
De Coster made her debut in 2000 with her first book, called Under Each Other, a collection of dark tales about the disintegration of an unusual family. Under Each Other appeared in the "Nieuw Wereldtijdschrift (NWT)".

In 2002, at the age of 26, De Coster published her debut novel, Vrije Val (Free Fall). Besides novels, De Coster also writes columns (among other things for the Flemish newspaper De Morgen). She is on the editorial staff of Dietsche Warande en Belfort, a literary magazine. In late 2009, she replaced Aaf Brandt Corstius as a daily columnist for nrc.next newspaper.

De Coster is also a visual artist. She works with video art, writes for theatre and writes lyrics for musicians such as Daan Stuyven and Dez Mona. De Coster regularly collaborates with visual artists such as video artist Nicolas Rombouts, artist Eric Joris of CREW (Performance Group) and artist Arne Quinze. Arne Quinze invited De Coster to capture the alienation which his monumental work Rock Strangers (Oostende) exude as well as the intimacy of My Secret Garden (Kunsthal Rotterdam) in contemporary stories and distinctive film footage.

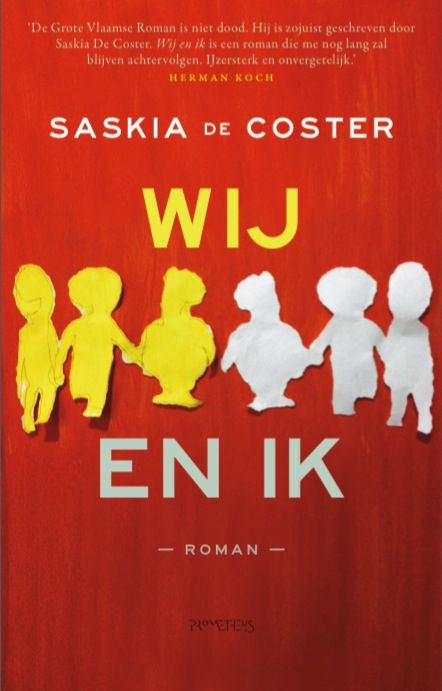
Cover Wij en Ik

De Coster has designed the cover of her sixth novel "Wij en ik" herself. She started "Project 397". Since her sixth novel "Wij en ik" counts 397 pages, she will read daily one page, every day on a different location. All those clips are posted on her YouTube channel.

== Publications ==
- Vrije Val ("Free Fall") ISBN 978-90-446-1051-2 (2002) Bert Baker
- Jeuk ("Itch") ISBN 978-90-446-1052-9 (2004) Bert Baker
- Eeuwige roem ("Eternal Glory") ISBN 978-90-446-0834-2 (2006) Uitgeverij Prometheus
- Held ("Hero") ISBN 978-90-446-1085-7 (2007) Uitgeverij Prometheus
- Dit is van Mij ("This is Mine") ISBN 978-90-446-1425-1 (2009) Uitgeverij Prometheus
- Wij en ik ("Us and Me") ISBN 978-90-446-2346-8(2013) Uitgeverij Prometheus

== Recognition ==
- HUMO magazine named her in the top ten best writers under 35
- Voted one of the ten best writers under 35 by De Groene Amsterdammer magazine
- Held ("Hero") was nominated for the BNG New Literature Prize and won the 2007 Cutting Edge Award for best romance
- Dit is van mij ("This is Mine") was on the longlist for the AKO Literatuurprijs en de Gouden Uil
