= Katha Pollitt =

American poet, essayist and critic (born 1949)

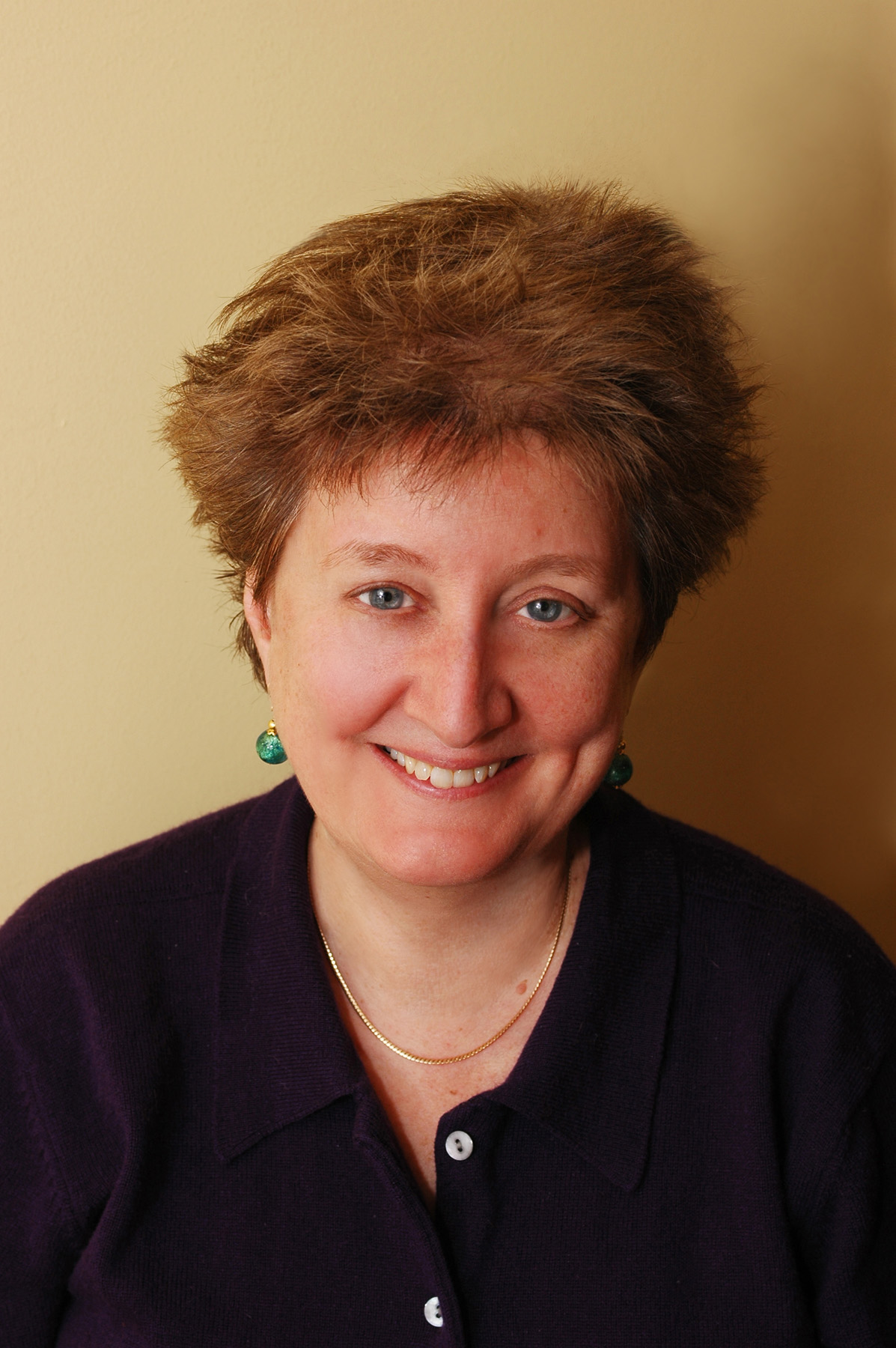
- Katha Pollitt in 2008
- Born: October 14, 1949 (age 77); New York City, U.S.
- Education: Radcliffe College (BA); Columbia University (MFA)
- Occupations: Author; journalist; poet; cultural critic
- Writing career
- Period: Late 20th, early 21st century
- Genres: Essays, poetry, magazine articles, non-fiction
- Subjects: Feminism, politics, reproductive rights
- Website: kathapollitt.blogspot.com

Katha Pollitt (born October 14, 1949) is an American poet, essayist and critic. She is the author of four essay collections and two books of poetry. Her writing focuses on political and social issues from a left-leaning perspective, including abortion, racism, welfare reform, feminism, and poverty.

== Early life and education ==
Pollitt was born in Brooklyn Heights, New York City. Her father was a lawyer and her mother was an agent involved in real estate. Her parents encouraged Pollitt to pursue her interest in poetry. Her father was Protestant and her mother was Jewish. Pollitt wrote extensively of her family in Learning to Drive, which is dedicated to her parents.

Pollitt earned a B.A. in philosophy from Radcliffe College in 1972 and an M.F.A. in writing from Columbia University in 1975. During her time at Harvard, she was involved with Students for a Democratic Society and took part, along with Jared Israel, in the student strike and shut down of 1969.

== Professional life ==
Pollitt is best known for her bimonthly column "Subject to Debate" in The Nation magazine. Her writing has also featured in publications such as Ms., The New York Times, and the London Review of Books. Her poetry has been republished in many anthologies and magazines, including The New Yorker and the 2006 Oxford Book of American Poetry. She has appeared on NPR's Fresh Air and All Things Considered, Charlie Rose, The McLaughlin Group, CNN, Dateline NBC and the BBC.

Much of Pollitt's writing is in defense of contemporary feminism and other forms of identity politics and tackles perceived misimpressions by critics from across the political spectrum; other frequent topics include abortion, the media, U.S. foreign policy, the politics of poverty (especially welfare reform), and human rights movements around the world.

Pollitt coined the phrase "the Smurfette principle" in 1991, in which she typifies the cartoon character Smurfette as the "lone female" in a group of males who is often a stereotypic figure.

In 2003, she was one of the signers of the Humanist Manifesto. In 2020, she was one of the signers of the Harper's Letter, which expressed support for protests for social justice while criticizing the growing number of disproportionately severe punishments for perceived slights or offenses.

On May 20, 2020, Pollitt said she would vote for Joe Biden in the presidential election, even "if he boiled babies and ate them".

== Publications ==
=== Essay collections ===
In 1994, Pollitt published Reasonable Creatures: Essays on Women and Feminism (Vintage), a collection of nineteen essays that first appeared in The Nation and other journals. The book's title was a reference to a line in Mary Wollstonecraft's 1794 treatise, A Vindication of the Rights of Woman – "I wish to see women neither heroines nor brutes; but reasonable creatures."

Most of her Nation essays from 1994 to 2001 were collected in Subject to Debate: Sense and Dissents on Women, Politics and Culture, published by the Modern Library in 2001.

On June 13, 2006, Random House published her book Virginity or Death!: And Other Social and Political Issues of Our Time, a further collection of her Nation columns.

In 2007, Pollitt published Learning to Drive: And Other Life Stories (Random House), a collection of personal essays. Learning to Drive is a departure from her political commentary, covering a range of topics from webstalking a cheating boyfriend to what she learned about her parents using the Freedom of Information Act.

Learning to Drive was adapted by screenwriter Sarah Kernochan and director Isabel Coixet into the 2014 film Learning to Drive, which stars Patricia Clarkson.

=== Poetry ===
The first book Pollitt published was a collection of poetry called Antarctic Traveler (Knopf, 1982), which won the National Book Critics Circle Award (1983).

Her second volume of poetry, The Mind-Body Problem, was published in 2009 and excerpted on the Granta website.

=== Pro: Reclaiming Abortion Rights ===
Politt has said that Pro: Reclaiming Abortion Rights (2014), was intended as a response to the "feeling among many pro-choice people that we need to be more assertive, less defensive". While the topic is always in debate, Pollitt posits that it needs to be discussed in a way that recognizes abortion as an integral component of women's reproductive lives. Her argument is built upon the notion that abortion is a "positive social good" and "an essential option for women". Pollitt says abortion needs to be looked at as "back into the lives and bodies of women, but also in the lives of men, and families, and the children those women already have or will have". She argues that the issue brings about how we discuss menstrual cycles with young girls and the number of resources we have available for families, both single parent and two-parent. Further the decision should not be looked at as the action of a woman thinking independently because abortion requires the "cooperation of many people beyond the woman herself". She said in October 2014 that Jewish tradition "does not have the concept of the personhood of the fetus (much less the embryo or fertilized egg). In Jewish law, you become a person when you draw your first breath."

A group of feminist scholars and activists analyzed Pro: Reclaiming Abortion Rights for "Short Takes: Provocations on Public Feminism," an initiative of the feminist journal Signs: Journal of Women in Culture and Society. The commentaries include a response by Pollitt.

== Personal life ==
On June 6, 1987, she married Randy Cohen, author of the New York Times Magazine column "The Ethicist." They later divorced. They have a daughter. On April 29, 2006, Pollitt married the political theorist Steven Lukes. They live in Manhattan.

== Awards, honors, grants ==
- The Frost Place poet in residence (1977)*
- National Book Critics Circle Award in Poetry (for Antarctic Traveler, 1983)
- National Endowment for the Arts (grant, 1984)
- Academy of American Poets ("Peter I. B. Lavan Younger Poets Award," 1984)
- Fulbright Scholarship (1985)
- Arvon Foundation Prize (1986)
- New York Foundation for the Arts (1987)
- John Simon Guggenheim Memorial Foundation (Fellowship, 1987)
- National Magazine Award (for "Essays and Criticism," 1992)
- Whiting Award (1992)
- Planned Parenthood Federation of America ("Maggie Award," 1993)
- Freedom from Religion Foundation ("Freethought Heroine Award," 1995)
- National Women's Political Caucus ("Exceptional Merit Media Award," 2001)
- National Magazine Award (for "Best Columns and Commentary," 2003)
- American Book Award ("Lifetime Achievement Award," 2010)
- The Nation Institute (Puffin Foundation Writing Fellow)
- Freedom From Religion Foundation (Honorary Board of distinguished achievers 2010)
- American Humanist Association ("Humanist Heroine," 2013)

== Bibliography ==
- Antarctic Traveller: Poems (Knopf, 1982) (ISBN 0394748956)
- Reasonable Creatures: Essays on Women and Feminism (Vintage, 1995) (ISBN 0679762787)
- Subject to Debate: Sense and Dissents on Women, Politics, and Culture (Modern Library Paperbacks, 2001) (ISBN 0679783431)
- Virginity or Death!: And Other Social and Political Issues of Our Time (Random House, 2006) (ISBN 081297638X)
- Learning to Drive: And Other Life Stories (Random House, 2007) (ISBN 1400063329)
- The Mind-Body Problem: Poems (Random House, 2009) (ISBN 1400063337)
- Pro: Reclaiming Abortion Rights (Picador, 2014) (ISBN 9780312620547)
