= Surviving the Bosnian Genocide =

2008 non-fiction book by Selma Leydesdorff

Surviving the Bosnian Genocide: The Women of Srebrenica Speak
- Author: Selma Leydesdorff
- Original title: De leegte achter ons laten: Een geschiedenis van de vrouwen van Srebrenica
- Translator: Kay Richardson
- Language: Dutch
- Published: Bert Bakker 2008; Indiana University Press 2011
- ISBN: 9789035132573
- OCLC: 213300314

Surviving the Bosnian Genocide: The Women of Srebrenica Speak is a non-fiction book by Dutch historian Selma Leydesdorff Originally published in 2008 by Bert Bakker as De leegte achter ons laten: Een geschiedenis van de vrouwen van Srebrenica, an English edition was published in 2011 by Indiana University Press.

== Publication history ==
De leegte achter ons laten: Een geschiedenis van de vrouwen van Srebrenica was originally published in Dutch in 2008 by Bert Bakker. An English-language edition, translated by Kay Richardson, was published in 2011 by the Indiana University Press. The publication was partially sponsored by Nederlands Letterenfonds. At the time of publication, Selma Leydesdorff was an oral historian and professor at the University of Amsterdam.

The book was largely developed from Leydesdorff's interviews with women who survived the massacre. The interviews were about the subjects entire lives, both before and after the war. Leydesdorff had previous experience interviewing Jewish victims of persecution, which made her appear sympathetic to several interviewees. Conversely, the fact she was Dutch initially provoked anger from some of those who felt the Netherlands bore some culpability for its role in Srebrenica.

== Summary ==
Surviving the Bosnian Genocide is about oral history book, based on interviews and testimonies given by Bosnian women who survived the Siege of Srebrenica and subsequent massacre by the Serbian army of the city's Bosniak Muslim men and boys. It has seven chapters, and events are ordered chronologically.

== Reception ==
The book was reviewed by Timothy Hensley in The Oral History Review and Inela Selimović in Human Rights Quarterly. Both praised the book for the way they felt Lesdesdorff had centred the interviews and the women's testimonies, with Hensley saying that Leydesdorff had "interject[ed] herself only to provide the necessary historical perspective to maintain its readability". He additionally said that the book provided a "clear, concise analysis" of the massacre, as well as a "snapshot" of the subject's lives during the 1990s and then a view of what happened in the immediate aftermath. As the interviews were collected and the book published relatively soon after the massacre and as many of the women had not left Bosnia and lacked the support to rebuild their communities, Hensley described them as being "trapped in a political, social, and economic limbo", which he pointed to as an example of what he felt was an ever-present "theme of isolation" in the book. Selimovic described it as an "indispensable" account and felt that the interviews and excerpts from testimony given to the ICTY demonstrated the "abrupt and systematic ruptures of communal ties" between the city's Serbian and Bosniak populations, though wished the book had included some quotes in the original Bosnian to "to affirm the complete voice of these women survivors".
