= Report about Case Srebrenica =

Report denying Srebrenica massacre

Report about Case Srebrenica (the first part)
- Report cover (2002)
- Author: Darko Trifunović
- Language: English
- Subject: Srebrenica massacre
- Publisher: Republika Srpska Government Bureau for Relations with the International Criminal Tribunal for the Former Yugoslavia
- Publication date: September 2002
- Publication place: Bosnia and Herzegovina
- Pages: 139
- OCLC: 180899246

Report about Case Srebrenica (the first part) was a controversial official report on the July 1995 Srebrenica massacre in eastern Bosnia and Herzegovina. It was prepared by Darko Trifunović (Serbian Cyrillic: Дарко Трифуновић) and published by the Republika Srpska Government Bureau for Relations with the International Criminal Tribunal for the Former Yugoslavia (ICTY).

The report denied that there had been a massacre at Srebrenica and accused the International Committee of the Red Cross of having "fabricated" its findings on the killings. Its claims were strongly criticised by the international community and the Bosniaks and were eventually disowned by the Republika Srpska government. In a judgment against Miroslav Deronjić, the Hague Tribunal judges described the report as "one of the worst examples of revisionism." No "second part" has ever been published.

== Background ==
In July 1995, forces of the Army of the Republika Srpska (VRS) captured the town of Srebrenica in eastern Bosnia, which had been cut off and surrounded despite the presence of soldiers from the United Nations Protection Force (UNPROFOR). Thousands of refugees had crowded into the town to escape the Serb advance. Following the Serb takeover of Srebrenica, an estimated 8,000 Bosniak men and boys were systematically massacred by Serb forces between 11–15 July and another 25,000–30,000 were subjected to ethnic cleansing. It was the largest act of mass murder in Europe since World War II.

Successive governments of Republika Srpska (and, for a while, Serbia) sought to deny the massacre and other war crimes committed by the VRS during the war. It was against this background that, as the former United Nations trial attorney Mark B. Harmon commented, "the campaign of misinformation and deceit reached its apotheosis seven years after the crimes were committed with the publication of the Report About Case Srebrenica (the first part)."

== Contents of the report ==
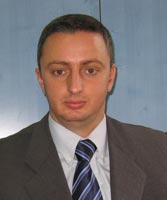
Darko Trifunović, the author of Report about Case Srebrenica, whose work on the report was strongly criticised.

The report was promoted as an effort "to present the whole truth about crimes committed in Srebrenica region regardless nationality of perpetrators of crimes and time when they were committed [sic]." It asserted that no more than 2,000 Bosniaks (Bosnian Muslims) had died at Srebrenica – all armed soldiers, not civilians – and that 1,600 of them had died in combat or while trying to escape the enclave. It consistently referred to the "alleged massacre", attributed the deaths of about 100 Bosniaks to "exhaustion" and concluded: "the number of Muslim soldiers who were executed by Bosnian Serb forces for personal revenge or for simple ignorance of international law […] would probably stand less than 100." The report dismissed as "mentally disturbed" a Bosnian Serb soldier who had admitted participating in the killings, and claimed that the survivors' stories were a product of their imaginations: "To walk for almost 20 days in an area that might be full of landmines, without any food and water, under the fear of being shot from any direction was such a trauma that soldiers sometimes mixed reality with illusions. Having looked at dead bodies under such psychological [pressure], some Muslim soldiers could have believed what they imagined." It asserted that "this combat might have looked like a mass killing in the eyes of frightened Muslim soldiers, although they carried weapons and shot at Bosnian Serb soldiers randomly."

The report also asserted that the findings of the International Committee of the Red Cross and other humanitarian organisations had been "manipulated" and "fabricated". It characterised Serbs as the victims of Bosniak war crimes around Srebrenica, asserting that in 1992 and 1993 alone 1300 Serb civilians were killed. This figure has been shown to be inaccurate, and the true number "three to nine times smaller", by the Research and Documentation Center in Sarajevo, a non-partisan institution with a multi-ethnic staff, whose data have been collected, processed, checked, compared and evaluated by an international team of experts. The instigator of the massacre, General Ratko Mladić, was mentioned only in the context of demanding the surrender of the town and evacuating civilians; the report asserted that he had tried "discouraging Serbs to take their wild revenge." The report claimed that "the Muslims inflated the number [of deaths] in order to accomplish what they wanted from the very beginning – to involve the international community in the conflict with Serbs."

According to Dejan Miletić, whom Paddy Ashdown, the High Representative for Bosnia and Herzegovina, removed in April 2004 from his post as Head of the Republika Srpska Secretariat for Relations with the International Criminal Tribunal in The Hague and Research of War Crimes, the report "had based its conclusions on publications found on the Internet, reports from the United Nations and other sources." It was intended to be sent to lawyers defending Bosnian Serbs on trial for war crimes.

== ICTY verdict ==
The ICTY reviewed the "Report About Case Srebrenica" and concluded the following:

The Trial Chamber admitted into evidence a document which represents one of the worst examples of revisionism in relation to the mass executions of Bosnian Muslims committed in Srebrenica in July 1995. This document, titled “Report about Case Srebrenica (the First Part)” was prepared by the Documentation Centre of Republika Srpska, Bureau of Government of Republika Srpska for Relation with ICTY on 1 September 2002. Throughout this report reference is made to the “alleged massacre” and this misrepresentation of the historical events culminates in the final conclusion of this report, which reads: […] the number of Muslim soldiers who were executed by Bosnian Serb forces for personal revenge or for simple ignorance of international law […] would probably stand less than 100.

== Reactions ==
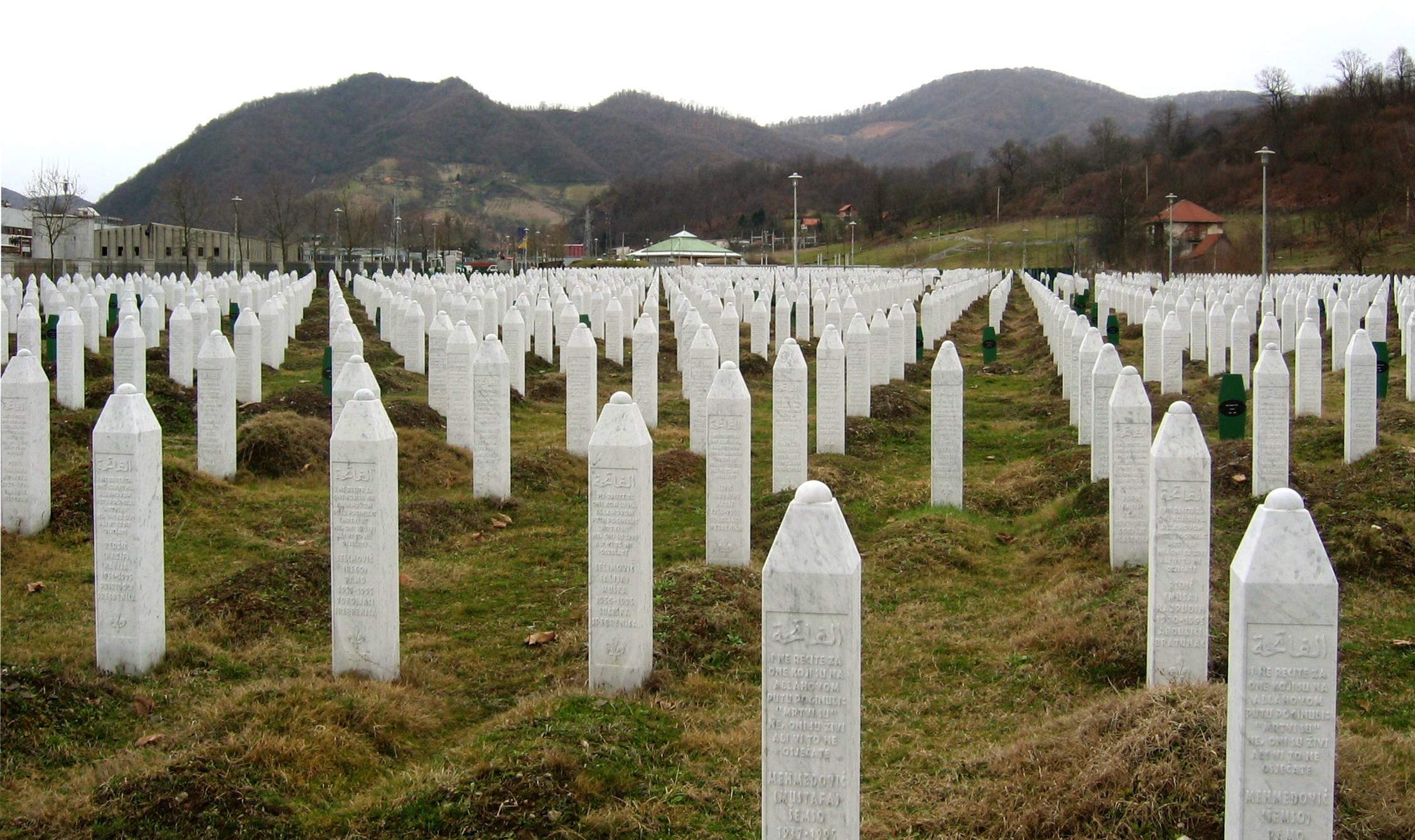
The cemetery at the Srebrenica-Potočari Memorial and Cemetery to Genocide Victims

After the report was published on 3 September 2002, it was condemned by a wide variety of Bosnian and international figures. A spokesman for the ICTY told Radio Free Europe that "any claim that the number of victims after the fall of the Srebrenica enclave was around the 2,000 mark, and most of those killed in battle, is an absolutely outrageous claim. It's utterly false, and it flies in the face of all of the evidence painstakingly collected in the investigation into the tragedy." He described the effort to minimise the number of victims as "frankly, disgusting." Carla del Ponte, the chief prosecutor of the ICTY, described the report's authors as "totally blind, profoundly insensitive and clearly willing to obstruct all efforts to find reconciliation, truth and justice." Del Ponte's legal adviser, Jean-Jacques Joris, criticised the report as "a saddening example of revisionism and an element which certainly stands in the way of reconciliation in the region." The ICTY prosecutors subsequently used the report as evidence in the trial in 2004 of Miroslav Deronjić; in their verdict, the judges called it "one of the worst examples of revisionism in relation to [the massacre]".

Paddy Ashdown, the High Representative for Bosnia and Herzegovina, condemned it as "tendentious, preposterous and inflammatory" and "so far from the truth as to be almost not worth dignifying with a response." His office issued a statement calling the report "an irresponsible attempt to deceive voters and to abuse the trauma of massacre survivors". Ashdown's spokesman, Julian Braithwaite, noted the report's publication just before elections in the Republika Srpska: "The question for the RS government is why are they publishing this report now, at the time when it could be easily interpreted as irresponsible electioneering. If they are playing down the fact that civilians were massacred and that children are being exhumed from mass graves with their hands tied behind their backs, then that it is outrageous." The European Union issued a statement calling on "all responsible people and institutions" to reject the study. The International Commission on Missing Persons issued a strongly worded statement calling the report a gross distortion of the facts:

Manipulation of the issue of the missing for political purposes, including the manipulation of numbers of missing, has been an ongoing practice within Bosnia and Herzegovina that only serves to cause further pain and suffering in a society that has already suffered so much. The study regarding the numbers of missing from the 1995 fall of Srebrenica made by the Republika Srpska's Government Bureau for Relations with the International Criminal Tribunal for the former Yugoslavia (ICTY) contains what ICMP believes to be serious inaccuracies.

The British Foreign Office minister Denis MacShane condemned the report as "an insult to the memory of those who died. The authors of this report belong in the same category as those who deny the Holocaust took place." The United States embassy in Bosnia and Herzegovina urged the Republika Srpska government to withdraw the report, calling it "an attempt to manipulate and divide the public in this country."

Bosnian media, political parties and Srebrenica survivors were likewise strongly critical. The Sarajevo-based newspaper Dnevni Avaz described the report as an attempt by the Bosnian Serb government to deny that genocide had taken place. The Srebrenica and Zepa Mothers Association condemned the report as "false, shameful and utterly amoral." The Party for Bosnia and Herzegovina denounced it as "yet another attempt by the Serb Republic authorities in an unscrupulous and brutal way to negate what probably is the worst crime in Europe after WW2." Alija Behmen, the Prime Minister of the Federation of Bosnia and Herzegovina, called it "a surprising forgery which is trying to delude the public and especially the Serbs in BiH. I honestly believe that this is the last attempt to enliven the policy which marked the tragic past of BiH. Negating the genocide cannot be a part of the election campaign."

On the Bosnian Serb side, opinions of the report were initially favourable. The Bosnian Serb media largely supported the report, and Republika Srpska president Mirko Šarović (who in October 2002 became the Serb member of the collective presidency) said that the report "should not be dismissed out of hand but merits careful study". A number of Bosnian Serb political figures made public statements denying that war crimes had happened and a government spokesman called the report a bid to promote "truth and reconciliation". The Republika Srpska Socialist Party leader, Lazar Ristić, welcomed the report and accused the Bosniak side of having "hitherto presented only false reports, in which names were listed of persons who are still alive today."

Nikola Špirić, the speaker of the National Assembly of Republika Srpska, called it "the worst election campaigning I have ever seen." Milorad Dodik, who was later to become prime minister of Republika Srpska, castigated the report as having been "written by an amateur for the purpose of manipulating public opinion" in advance of the elections and said:

It is a political gaffe of the government, since one can see that the report was written several years ago by one man. The report had been written in 1996 and 1997, which goes to show that it does not mention the report by the Netherlands Institute for War Documentation. [...] The government shouldn't have allowed itself to draft such a superficial, amateurish report which put Republika Srpska into such a difficult situation. Responsibility for the consequences of the report's publication must be borne by those who produced it in such a superficial and amateurish way.

The Republika Srpska government was, however, more equivocal. Its prime minister, Mladen Ivanić, accused the media in the Federation entity of having "made [a] fuss over the report for their own purposes." Nonetheless, the outcry from the international community forced the government of Republika Srpska to distance itself from the report, saying that it had not been fully analysed and endorsed:

The two studies, which the RS Government's Bureau for Cooperation with the ICTY compiled, are not made by the RS Government. They are part of the report that the RS Government’s Bureau for Cooperation with the ICTY submits to the RS Government every three months. The fact that the Srebrenica report had been condemned by the Office of the High Representative before the Bureau's news conference was held comes as a surprise. The Bureau representatives clearly said at the news conference that both reports are to be submitted to the RS Government, which tells us that the OHR based its condemnation on news reports from the BiH Federation media, which said that the Bureau reports are RS Government's report. It also comes as a surprise the fact that the OHR representatives commented on a document, which they have not read. This is another confirmation that the OHR gives in to the pressures coming from the Sarajevo media and that the OHR creates its views by using their [the Sarajevo media's] information and press releases, thus bringing its own [the OHR's] impartiality in question.

The Republika Srpska government subsequently disowned the report with Prime Minister Ivanić saying that it was an "unfinished version" and "not an attitude of the government of Republika Srpska." Two years later, after further pressure from the international community, the Bosnian Serb government issued an official apology for the massacre and admitted that "enormous crimes" had been "committed in the area of Srebrenica in July 1995."
