= Netherlands Institute for Advanced Study =

Research institute in the Netherlands

NIAS
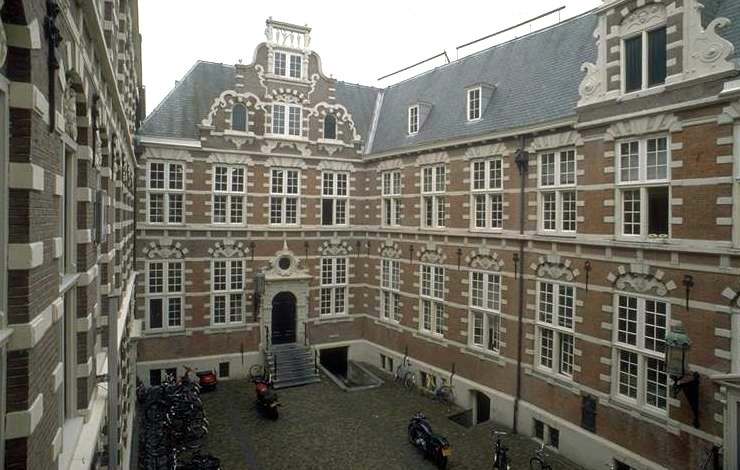
- Oost-Indisch Huis (Amsterdam)
- Formation: 1970
- Headquarters: Amsterdam
- Parent organization: Royal Netherlands Academy of Arts and Sciences
- Website: https://nias.knaw.nl

The Netherlands Institute for Advanced Study in the Humanities and Social Sciences (NIAS) in Amsterdam, Netherlands, is an independent research institute in the field of the humanities and social and behavioural sciences founded in 1970. The institute offers advanced research facility for international scholars of all of the humanities and social sciences. It is a member of Some Institutes for Advanced Study (SIAS) and the Network of European Institutes for Advanced Studies (NetIAS).

== History ==
The idea for NIAS was initiated by Dutch linguist E.M. Uhlenbeck in the late 1960s. It was inspired on the concept of the Institute for Advanced Study of Princeton and Stanford. The institute was founded in Wassenaar in 1970 with the support of all Dutch universities, the Netherlands Organization for Scientific Research (NWO) and the Royal Netherlands Academy of Arts and Sciences (KNAW) and welcomed their first fellows in 1971 on the NIAS Campus. Since 1988 it has operated under the direction and auspices of the KNAW.

From 1995 until 2002 Henk Wesseling has been rector of the institute. He was succeeded by Wim Blockmans in 2002. From 2010 to 2013 the rector was Professor Aafke Hulk. Paul Emmelkamp was rector from 2013 to 2016 and implemented plans to move NIAS to Amsterdam. As of 15 August 2016, the institute is located in the Jorishof wing of the Oost-Indisch Huis in Amsterdam. Theo Mulder was interim rector in 2017. In 2018 Jan Willem Duyvendak became rector.

== Fellows ==
Each year NIAS welcomes around fifty fellows who stay at the institute for five to ten months. Half of the fellows are Dutch, the other half foreign. Fellows are prominent researchers and senior scholars with a PhD and who have made an important contribution in their fields. Applications for most fellowships at NIAS are open to qualified candidates. All fellowships are awarded by the scholarship committee. In addition to regular fellowships, NIAS also hosts some special co-sponsored fellowship programmes, some of which are by invitation only. NIAS also hosts theme groups, which bring together scholars of different backgrounds with specific expertise to work together on a daily basis.

Fellows include and have included: Svetlana Alpers, David E. Apter, Tito Boeri, Gerrit Broekstra, Jaap R. Bruijn, Arif Dirlik, Edgar L. Feige, Lewis Goldberg, Richard Goldstone, Bernd Heine, Martin Hellwig, Anne-Lot Hoek, Ernst Homburg, Henkjan Honing, Fred Inglis, Lisa Jardine, Bruce Kapferer, Ronald Kaplan, David Mitchell, Wolfgang Mommsen, Henry Schvey, Frits van Oostrom, Benjamin Radcliff, Bruce Russett, Hein Schreuder, Alex Verrijn Stuart, Henk Wesseling, Robert S. Wistrich, John Woods, Nasr Abu Zayd, and Gerard de Zeeuw.

== Distinguished Lorentz Fellowship ==
The Distinguished Lorentz Fellowship (DLF) is granted once a year to a leading scholar working on the interface between the humanities and social sciences on the one hand and the natural and technological sciences on the other.
