= Henk Wesseling =

Dutch historian (1937–2018)

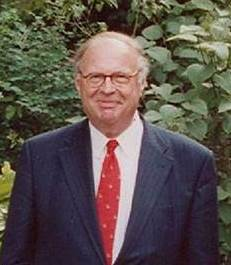
- Wesseling in 2002
- Born: 6 August 1937; The Hague, Netherlands
- Died: 18 August 2018 (aged 81); Oegstgeest, Netherlands
- Education: Leiden University
- Known for: Divide and Rule: The Partition of Africa, 1880-1914
- Awards: The Honorary medal for Arts and Science of the Order of the House of Orange
- Scientific career
- Fields: Historian
- Workplaces: Leiden University; Netherlands Institute for Advanced Study

Henk Wesseling (6 August 1937 – 18 August 2018) was a Dutch historian. He was a professor of contemporary history at Leiden University, former rector of the Netherlands Institute for Advanced Study between 1995 and 2002.

== Biography ==
Wesseling was the son of the Catholic journalist and politician C.D. Wesseling. After attending secondary school at the Aloysius College in The Hague, he studied history at Leiden University.

From 1973 to 2002 Wesseling was professor of General History (after 1870) at Leiden University. He founded and was director of the Institute for the History of European Expansion at this university. He was also rector of the Netherlands Institute for Advanced Study in the Humanities and Social Sciences (NIAS) in Wassenaar from 1995 to 2002 and later a fellow of the same institute.

In 1988 he was appointed member of the Royal Netherlands Academy of Arts and Sciences (KNAW). He was also a member of the Academia Europaea and the Royal Academy of Overseas Sciences. Together with Wim van den Doel and Freddy Heineken, he designed the Eurotopia plan.

In 1996 Wesseling held the Huizinga Lecture in Leiden under the title 'Search Prof. Huizinga not really himself? Huizinga and the Spirit of the Thirties'.

Wesseling accompanied Crown Prince Willem-Alexander during his history studies at Leiden University. In addition, he has advised Queen Beatrix several times in connection with state visits. At the end of 2004, Wesseling received the 21st Medal of Honor for Art and Science of the House Order of Orange from Queen Beatrix at Huis ten Bosch Palace.

On 15 April 2010, the ambassador of France presented the decorations of 'Commandeur de la Légion d'honneur ' to Wesseling. The distinction was awarded to him for his scientific merits and his contribution to Franco-Dutch cooperation.

== Work ==
Wesseling published widely-read studies on imperialism, the partition of Africa, French military, intellectual, and cultural history, and a biography of Charles de Gaulle.

As an academic manager, he collaborated in establishing and funding numerous projects such as the European summer schools, an international project for the comparative study of India and Indonesia, and the Transfer of Science and Technology Program.

=== Leiden University Center for the History of European Expansion and Reaction ===
In 1974, shortly after he was appointed to the chair of European history, Wesseling founded the "Center for the History of European Expansion and Reaction" within the Leiden University history department.

This research institute included specialists in China and India, as well as Indonesia, and funding was found to hire young specialists in Atlantic and African and other topics. Colonial history had been defunct for nearly two decades, but Wesseling insisted on its importance in Dutch and European history, although some colleagues remain dubious.

The department was custodian of hundreds of kilometers of shelf space devoted to primary sources that were exploited by advanced students. An annual workshop brought in leading scholars and a new specialized journal Itinerario was launched.

== Bibliography ==
- Soldaat en krijger. Franse opvattingen over leger en oorlog, 1905-1914 (Assen, 1969; 2nd edition: Amsterdam 1988) translated into English as Soldier and Warrior. French Attitudes toward the Army and War on the Eve of the First World War (Greenwood Press, Westport, Connecticut, and London 2000)
- (ed.) Expansion and Reaction. Essays on European Expansion and Reactions in Asia and Africa (Leiden 1978)
- Vele ideeën over Frankrijk. Opstellen over geschiedenis en cultuur [Essays on French history and civilization] (Amsterdam 1987)
- Indië verloren, rampspoed geboren en andere opstellen over de geschiedenis van de Europese expansie [Essays on the history of European expansion] (Amsterdam 1988)
- ed. with J. A. de Moor) Imperialism and War. Essays on Colonial Wars in Asia and Africa (Leiden 1989)
- Verdeel en heers. De deling van Afrika, 1880-1914, 1991, Bert Bakker - Amsterdam, ISBN 90-351-2880-X (Divide and Rule. The Partition of Africa, 1880-1914. Westport: Praeger Publishers, 1996 (Translation of Verdeel en Heers, 1991))
- Oorlog lost nooit iets op. Opstellen over Europese geschiedenis (Amsterdam 1993)
- Onder historici. Opstellen over geschiedenis en geschiedschrijving (Amsterdam 1995)
- Bibliografie van de geschriften van prof. dr. H. L. Wesseling (Amsterdam, 2002)
- "Le modèle colonial hollandais dans la théorie coloniale française, 1880-1914." Outre-Mers. Revue d'histoire 63.231 (1976): 223-255 online.
- Europa's koloniale eeuw. De koloniale rijken in de negentiende eeuw, 1815-1919, druk 2003, 396 blz., uitgeverij Bert Bakker - Amsterdam, ISBN 90-351-2421-9
- Frankrijk in oorlog. De meest dramatische eeuw uit de Franse geschiedenis., druk 2006, 352 blz., uitgeverij Bert Bakker - Amsterdam, ISBN 90-351-3061-8
- Plaatsen van Herinnering, 4 dln., Amsterdam, 2005–2007.
- "Globalization: A historical perspective." European Review 17.3-4 (2009): 455-62 online.
- A Cape of Asia: Essays on European History (Leiden University Press, 2011), 177pp; contains 18 of his essays in English. Online
