= Network of European Institutes for Advanced Studies =

The Network of European Institutes for Advanced Studies (NETIAS) was created in 2004 to stimulate connections between different institutes for Advanced Studies. The IAS combined employ around 500 fellows a year.

NETIAS is a member of the European Alliance for Social Sciences and Humanities.

== Members ==
The members of the network include:

Institute	City	Country	Link
Aarhus Institute of Advanced Studies	Aarhus	Denmark	
Centre for Advanced Study at the Norwegian Academy of Science and Letters	Oslo	Norway	
Centre for Advanced Study Sofia	Sofia	Bulgaria	
Centre for Research in the Arts, Social Sciences and Humanities	Cambridge	United Kingdom	
Collegium de Lyon	Lyon	France	
Collegium Helveticum	Zurich	Switzerland	
Freiburg Institute for Advanced Studies	Freiburg	Germany	
Hamburg Institute for Advanced Study	Hamburg	Germany	
Hanse-Wissenschaftskolleg	Delmenhorst	Germany	
Helsinki Collegium for Advanced Studies	Helsinki	Finland	
Iméra - Institute for Advanced Study of Aix Marseille Université	Aix-en-Provence	France	
Institut d'études avancées de Nantes	Nantes	France	
Institut d'études avancées de Paris	Paris	France	
Institut für die Wissenschaften vom Menschen	Vienna	Austria	
Institute for Advanced Studies in the Humanities	Edinburgh	Scotland	
Institute for Advanced Study at Central European University	Budapest	Hungary	
Instituto di Studi Avanzati di Bologna	Bologna	Italy	
Madrid Institute for Advanced Study	Madrid	Spain	
Netherlands Institute for Advanced Study in the Humanities and Social Sciences	Amsterdam	Netherlands	
New Europe College	Bucharest	Romania	
Swedish Collegium for Advanced Study	Uppsala	Sweden	
Wissenschaftskolleg zu Berlin	Berlin	Germany	
Zentrum für interdisziplinäre Forschung	Bielefeld	Germany	
Zukunftskolleg	Konstanz	Germany	
