= Nehemiah Robinson =

Jewish international lawyer

- Born: 1898; Lithuania
- Died: January 12, 1964 (aged 65–66); New York City, U.S.
- Occupation: Jurist

Nehemiah Robinson (1898 – 12 January 1964) was a jurist, and an expert on genocide, and reparations to victims of the Holocaust. He was the director of the Institute of Jewish Affairs from 1947 to 1964. Menachem Z. Rosensaft stated that he is "one of the leading authorities on the Genocide Convention". Robinson worked closely with the Jewish Material Claims Against Germany.

== Biography ==
Robinson was born in Lithuania, and left to the United States in 1940, with his brother Jacob Robinson.

His brother is the namesake of the Jacob Robinson Institute at the Hebrew University of Jerusalem.

== Bibliography ==
- International safeguard of human rights. Fourth report, part III. Co-authored by Jacob Robinson and Oskar Karbach. New York: Commission to Study the Organization of Peace. (1944)
- Indemnification and reparations: Jewish aspects. Ephraim Fischoff, Editor. New York: Institute of Jewish Affairs of the American Jewish Congress and World Jewish Congress. (1944)
- Problems of European Reconstruction. The Quarterly Journal of Economics, Vol. 60. (November 1945)
- Restitution legislation in Germany. New York: Institute of Jewish Affairs (1949)
- The Arab countries of the Near East and their Jewish communities. New York: Institute of Jewish Affairs (1951)
- United Nations Convention on the declaration of death of missing persons. New York: Institute of Jewish Affairs (1951)
- The Jews of Hungary : survey of their history and postwar situation. New York: Institute of Jewish Affairs, World Jewish Congress (1952)
- Convention relating to the status of refugees : its history, significance and contents. New York: Institute of Jewish Affairs (1952)
- The Spain of Franco and its policies toward the Jews. New York: Institute of Jewish Affairs (1953)
- Persia and Afghanistan and their Jewish communities. New York: Institute of Jewish Affairs (1953)
- Convention Relating to the Status of Stateless Persons: its history and interpretation: a commentary. New York: Institute of Jewish Affairs (1955)
- European Jewry ten years after the war. New York: Institute of Jewish Affairs (1956)
- The United Nations and the World Jewish Congress. New York: Institute of Jewish Affairs (1956?)
- The Universal declaration of human rights: its origin, significance, application, and interpretation. New York Institute of Jewish Affairs(1958)
- Dictionary of Jewish public affairs and related matters. In collaboration with Gerhard Jacoby [and others]. New York: Institute of Jewish Affairs. (1958)
- The Genocide convention: a commentary. New York: Institute of Jewish Affairs (1960)
- Eichmann's confederates and the Third Reich hierarchy. New York: Institute of Jewish Affairs (1961)
- Report on the activities of the Institute of Jewish Affairs, 1959. Geneva: World Jewish Congress (1961)
- Thirty years of strain and stress: January 30, 1933 - January 30, 1963. New York: World Jewish Congress (1963)
- Ten years of German indemnification. New York: Conference on Jewish Material Claims Against Germany (1964)
