= Institute for Jewish Policy Research =

UK think tank on contemporary Jewish Affairs

Logo

The Institute for Jewish Policy Research (JPR), founded as the Institute of Jewish Affairs, is a London-based research institute and think tank. It specialises in contemporary Jewish affairs. JPR also runs a public education programme, and has hosted lectures from Chief Rabbi Lord Sacks, James Wolfensohn, Professor Jonathan Sarna and Professor Zygmunt Bauman.

== History ==
The institute was founded in New York in 1941, under the auspices of the World Jewish Congress and the American Jewish Congress, as a research institute to provide analysis of political, legal and economic issues affecting Jewish life. The institute's founder Jacob Robinson argued that Jewish leaders, struggling for the interests of the Jewry after World War I, “were hampered by the lack of up-to-date information on the situation of the Jews and no less by the lack of research into relevant legal and political options.” The IJA was established to bridge the gap. The institute's research focused on the analysis of the political, legal and economic aspects of Jewish life since World War I. Their reports examined a number of topics including: the situation of Jewish communities in various countries, Antisemitism, human rights related to minorities and migration, and The Holocaust and its aftermath. The organisation was also involved in formulating a postwar policy to secure Jewish rights and freedom internationally.

Jacob Robinson, IJA's founder, served as its first director (1941–1947). He was succeeded by Nehemiah Robinson (1947–1964) and Oscar Karbach (1964–1973). In the late 1940s, the organisation, together with WJC's Political Department, was engaged in the preparation of reports submitted to the United Nations and other organisations.

The institute moved to London in 1965, and was reestablished as the Institute for Jewish Policy Research in February 1996.

== Structure ==
It is a registered charity under English law and it exists to provide "policy-related research and analysis for individuals and organizations concerned with the enhancement of contemporary Jewish life." Its honorary president is Jacob Rothschild, 4th Baron Rothschild, its chairman is Stephen Moss, and its executive director is Dr Jonathan Boyd. Previous directors of the institute include Professor Barry Kosmin, and Antony Lerman.

== Collections ==
The institute's archives (1888 - 1966) are held at University College London. The collection consists primarily of printed literature relating to Jewish affairs but evidences British newspapers with fascist content published during the period.

== See also ==
- Patterns of Prejudice
