= Norwegian Press Complaints Commission =

The Norwegian Press Complaints Commission (Norwegian: Pressens Faglige Utvalg) is a complaint commission of Norwegian Press Association.

The members of the commission from are (July 2023 to June 2025):

Board of Directors:

Tron Strand (Chairperson) Bergens Tidende

Deputy chair:

- Harald H. Rise Mediebedriftenes Landsforening (MBL)
- Dag Idar Tryggestad (NJ)
- Tora Bakke Håndlykken (NR)
- Randi Øgrey Mediebedriftenes Landsforening (MBL)
- Margrethe Håland Solheim (NJ)
- Per Brikt Olsen (Fagpressen)
- Tomas Bruvik (LLA)
- Vibeke Fürst Haugen (NRK)
- Olav T. Sandnes (TV 2)
- Kenneth Andresen (Viaplay Group)
- Magnus Vatn (Warner Bros. Discovery)
- (Magasin/MBL)

Members:

- Mona Grivi Norman (Deputy Chair) VG
- Thomas Frigård, Kommunal Rapport
- Marte Bjerke, Fagbladet
- Vegard Venli, Aftenposten
- Rune Ytreberg, iTromsø
- Fredrik Nordahl, Varden
- Ragnhild Vartdal, NRK
- Hilde Vormedal Nybø, Sunnhordland
- Johan Ailo Kalstad, NRK Sapmi
- Arne Lothe, Mediebedriftenes Landsforening (MBL)
- Ina Lindahl Nyrud, Norsk Journalistlag (NJ)
- Solveig Husøy, Norsk Redaktørforening (NR)
- Reidun Kjelling Nybø, Norsk Redaktørforening (NR)

Representing the general public:

- Ingrid Rosendorf Joys, Caritas
- Øyvind Kvalnes, Department of Management and Organisation, BI
- Ylva Lindberg, Norfund
