= Henry Schvey =

American academic

Henry I. Schvey
- Born: New York City, U.S.
- Occupation: Academic

Academic background
- Education: University of Wisconsin; Indiana University

Academic work
- Institutions: Washington University in St. Louis; Leiden University
- Website: https://pad.wustl.edu/people/henry-i-schvey

Henry I. Schvey is an American academic with expertise in modern American drama, theatre, literature and the arts, and expressionism. Schvey is professor of drama and comparative literature and affiliate faculty in the American cultural studies program at Washington University in St. Louis.

Schvey was chair of the performing arts department at Washington University from 1987 to 2007 and the Director of the American Literature Program at Leiden University in the Netherlands from 1984 to 1987. He has authored books, essays, and review articles on topics related to American drama and literature, including works of playwrights like William Shakespeare, Tennessee Williams, Arthur Miller, and David Mamet. In addition to his academic work, Schvey has directed numerous theatrical productions and has been involved in various cultural and academic initiatives.

== Early life and education ==
Schvey was born in New York City. He attended Hunter College Elementary School and the Horace Mann School for Boys.

Schvey majored in comparative literature at University of Wisconsin–Madison where he graduated, with honors, in 1969. He graduated with an MA in West European Studies from Indiana University in 1971.

Schvey completed a Ph.D. in comparative literature at Indiana University Bloomington in 1977.

== Career ==
Schvey began his academic career at Leiden University in 1974 as an assistant professor in the English department. He was promoted to the position of associate professor in 1980. During the years 1980–1981 and 1983, he secured a fellowship at the Netherlands Institute for Advanced Study. Schvey continued his affiliation with Leiden University until 1987, during which time he also undertook visiting appointments at other institutions. In 1982 Schvey directed a prize-winning production of Peter Shaffer's Equus starring Jon van Eerd.

Between 1983 and 1984, Schvey was visiting associate professor of English and director of theatre at Hobart and William Smith Colleges. He served as a consultant for the Nobel Committee of the Swedish Academy and held a position on the Board of Governors for the Fulbright Commission from 1985 to 1987. In 1986, Schvey was visiting professor of English and drama at Webster University.

Between 1987 and 2007, Schvey served as the chair of the performing arts department at Washington University. Between 1988 and 1989, Schvey served on the editorial board for American Drama. In 2001 and 2002, he was a Fellow in the Inaugural Playwriting Initiative at the Kennedy Center for the Performing Arts.

In 2007, Washington University celebrated the achievements of Henry Schvey, who served as the chair of the Washington University Performing Arts Department for 19 years before stepping down from the position. Schvey has given lectures and produced a substantial body of work in the fields of contemporary European, British, and American theater. During the gathering, attended by students, faculty, family, and friends, it was announced that Schvey would be taking a one-year sabbatical before returning to the university as a professor. Rob Henke would succeed him as the new chair. Schvey, known for his popularity among students and his prolific writing in the fields of drama and literature, expressed his gratitude for the experience and hoped for continuity in his absence. The event featured tributes from those who had been touched by Schvey's influence, including British actress Jane Lapotaire, and highlighted his directing accomplishments, playwriting, and contributions to the arts.

Over the course of more than 40 years, Schvey has directed a total of 49 plays, among them, "Angels in America, Part I: Millennium Approaches" by Tony Kushner, "A Midsummer Night's Dream" by William Shakespeare, and Machinal by Sophie Treadwill. He has also world premieres, including Richard Selzer's "The Black Swan" and Jim Leonard Jr.'s "Gray's Anatomy."

== Selected publications ==
=== Books ===
- The Plastic Theatre of Tennessee Williams: Expressionist Drama and the Visual Arts. Edinburgh: Edinburgh University Press, 2022. ISBN 9781474427494
- Blue Song: St. Louis in the Life and Work of Tennessee Williams. Columbia: University of Missouri Press, 2021. ISBN 9780826222305
- The Poison Tree: A Memoir. St. Louis: Walrus Books, 2016. ISBN 1940442168
- New Essays on American Drama, eds. Henry I. Schvey and Gilbert Debusscher. Amsterdam and Atlanta: Editions Rodopi, B.V., 1989. ISBN 978-9051831078
- Oskar Kokoschka: the Painter as Playwright. Detroit: Wayne State University Press, 1982. ISBN 0814317022

=== Book chapters ===
- The Place I Was Made For’: Tennessee Williams in New Orleans.” In New Orleans: A Literary History, ed. T.R. Johnson. Cambridge University Press, 2019, 225–241. ISBN 1108498191
- Tennessee Williams and European Expressionism,” in Tennessee Williams and Europe: Intercultural Encounters, Transatlantic Exchanges, ed. John S. Bak. Amsterdam: Editions Rodopi, B.V., 2014, 65–88. ISBN 978-90-420-3873-8
- Getting the Colored Lights Going’: Expressionism and A Streetcar Named Desire,” in Essays on A Streetcar Named Desire, ed. Brenda Murphy (Pasadena and Hackensack: Salem Press, 2010), 58–79.
- Power Plays: David Mamet's Theatre of Manipulation,” in David Mamet: A Casebook, ed. Leslie Kane (New York and London: Garland Publishing, 1992), 87–108.
- D.H. Lawrence and Expressionism,” in D.H. Lawrence: New Studies, ed. Christopher Heywood (New York: St. Martin's Press, 1987), 124–37.
- John Arden: From Paradox to Propaganda,” Contemporary British Drama, eds. Hedwig Bock and Albert Wertheim (New York and Munich: Max Hueber Verlag, 1981), 47–70.
- The Importance of Past Time in the Plays of Lanford Wilson,” in Contemporary American Drama, eds. Hedwig Bock and Albert Wertheim (New York and Munich: Max Hueber Verlag, 1981), 225- 40.* The Playwright's Eye: Oskar Kokoschka's Morder Hoffnung der Frauen,” Proceedings of the International Comparative Literature Association, ed. Ulrich Weisstein (Innsbruck: University of Innsbruck Press), 1981.

=== Journal articles ===
- After the Fox: The Influence of D.H. Lawrence upon Tennessee Williams. The Tennessee Williams Annual Review, spring 2018, 115–144.
- The Tragic Poetics of Tennessee Williams, Etudes Anglaises: Special Tennessee Williams Centenary Issue, eds. Elisabeth Angel-Perez and Marie Pecorari 64/1 2011, 74–85.
- Review of Eugene O’Neill, Beyond the Horizon and Tennessee Williams, Spring Storm. Theatre Journal (March, 2011), 111–15.
- Hamlet as Teenager: A Rebel with a Cause, Belles Lettres Vol. IX, No.1 (September/December, 2008), 27–29.
- A Traveling Salesman in Beijing: Global Cultures Translated Through Theatre, Tamkang Review 38.2 (June 2008), 79–88.
- Father-Son Relationships in the Plays of Sam Shepard, in Sam Shepard, ed. Harold Bloom (New York: Chelsea House, 2003), rpt. from Modern Drama, Vol. XXXVI, No. 1, 1993, 12–26.
- The Master and His Double: Eugene O’Neill and Sam Shepard, in Journal of Dramatic Theory and Criticism, Vol. V, No. 2, Sp. 1991, 49–60.
- David Mamet: Games of Manipulation and Power, New Theatre Quarterly, Vol. IV, No. 13, Feb. 1988, 77–88.
- At the Deathbed: Edward Albee's All Over, Modern Drama, Vol. XXX, No. 3, 1987, 352–63.
- “The Grinning Reaper: Death and Dying in Contemporary American Drama,” Dutch Quarterly Review of Anglo-American Letters, 1984/1, 47–61.
- Sylvia Plath's The Bell Jar: Bildungsroman or Case History?” Dutch Quarterly Review of Anglo- American Letters, 1978, 18–37.
- Oskar Kokoschka's ‘The Dreaming Youths,’ Books Abroad, Vol. 49, No. 3, Summer 1975, 484–85.
