= Jared Israel =

American journalist

Jared Israel (born 1944) is an American writer and activist who edits the website The Emperor’s New Clothes, and has been published in Arutz Sheva. He graduated from Harvard University where he was involved in student protests, and also attended Columbia University. At Harvard he was a co-chairman of Students for a Democratic Society (SDS) and, in April 1969, a leader of the University Hall building takeover that was broken up by hundreds of outside police, in response to which Harvard students went on strike, closing Harvard for the only time in its history.

Israel served as one of the co-chairmen of the International Committee to Defend Slobodan Milošević (ICDSM). He has denied events leading to the Srebrenica massacre and its consequences.

Jared Israel has written extensively challenging the mainstream account of what happened during the September 11 attacks and suggesting it was an "inside job".
