= Brennpunkt =

- Logo since 2019
- Genre: Documentary; Investigative journalism
- Country of origin: Norway
- Original language: Norwegian

Original release
- Network: NRK
- Release: 1996 – present

Brennpunkt (lit. 'Focal Point') is a Norwegian investigative documentary series and division of the NRK. The series has aired since 1996, except for a hiatus in 2007. It was originally hosted by Håkon Haugsbø, and from 2014 by Jeanette Platou. As of February 2024, the series has been produced without an on-screen presenter since 2019.

The series has won several Gullruten awards, as well as a Prix Italia award and a Daniel Pearl Award for Outstanding International Investigative Journalism (in cooperation with journalists from BBC's Newsnight, The Guardian and de Volkskrant, for exposing activities of the Trafigura company).
