= Uitgeverij Prometheus =

Dutch publishing company

Uitgeverij Prometheus is a Dutch publishing company whose main focus is on literature, history and language. It was founded by Mai Spijkers in 1989. Bert Bakker is a notable imprint of Prometheus.

== History ==
=== Bert Bakker ===
Bert Bakker was founded in 1898 as D.A. Daamen's Uitgeversmij. Just before the second-world war it was bought by Bert Bakker (1912), a young Christian poet. During the first years of the war he sold the complete stock but as he could only publish new books illegally, he joined the underground newspaper Vrij Nederland. After the war he sold most of the activities of Daame started the literary magazine Maatstaf and published quite successfully poetry in paperback (Ooievaarpockets). In 1956 he published Het bittere kruid, een kleine kroniek by Marga Minco. The memoirs of a Jewish girl whose family was taken to the extermination camps in Germany and had to live with that. In 1966 his nephew and namesake Bert Bakker jr (1942) joined the company (then Bert Bakker/Daamen) after he was trained in the booktrade and as a representative. In 1968 he took over the daily routine and started publishing the works of Marquis de Sade which was up till then forbidden literature. In 1970, after the death of Bert Bakker sr, Bet Bakker was named 'statutair directeur' after which he changed the name in uitgeverij Bert Bakker. After two years Bert Bakker found a buyer in Kluwer, a conglomerate in Deventer.

The publishing company was founded by "legendary" publisher Bert Bakker, who was succeeded by his nephew, also named Bert Bakker, in 1969. The younger Bakker's tenure was marked by conflict; he himself had little knowledge of literature and kept the company afloat by publishing a number of non-literary books. Bakker was forced to resign from the company in 1993, "een puinzooi achterlatend" ("leaving a mess"). The company merged with Prometheus, another publishing company, and the joint group was owned by PCM Uitgevers. Bakker was succeeded by Mai Spijkers, who had earlier been an editor for Bakker but had been forced out and, credited with a keen eye for business, had made the competitor Prometheus a success; he led Prometheus/Bert Bakker after then-president Van Albada left the company in 2003. Prometheus/Bert Bakker became one of the largest literary publishers in the Netherlands, publishing best-selling authors such as Connie Palmen, Maria Stahlie, Tim Krabbé, Hafid Bouazza, and Martin Bril, besides prominent historians and politicians such as Frits van Oostrom, Wouter Bos and Wijnand Duyvendak.

=== Prometheus ===
Prometheus was founded by former Bert Bakker editor-in-chief Mai Spijkers in 1989. Prometheus was created as part of the Malherbe Group, whose books department was sold to Meulenhoff in 1991, after which Bert Bakker was also acquired by Meulenhoff and Spijkers became director of the three merged publishing companies. In 1994–5 they merged into PCM Uitgevers, where the educational branch of Meulenhoff was detached to merge with two other educational book companies to form ThiemeMeulenhoff in 2000, while Bert Bakker merged into Prometheus. Both were bought back by founder Mai Spijkers in 2007, making Uitgeverij Prometheus an independent publishing company with Bert Bakker as an imprint.

Bert Bakker -both the company and the owner- were known for their fierce support of Dutch poets (against the grain of commercialism), and supported and published poets such as Paul van Ostaijen, Martinus Nijhoff and A. Roland Holst. His last publication was a book of poetry by Neeltje Maria Min; the latter's Voor wie ik liefheb wil ik heten became the most successful Dutch collection of poetry ever.
