= Dan Corry =

British special advisor

Dan Corry OBE

Director of Number 10 Policy Unit
- In office 2007–2008
- Prime Minister: Gordon Brown
- Preceded by: David Bennett
- Succeeded by: Nick Pearce

Personal details
- Born: Dan Corry
- Occupation: Economist

Daniel Richard Corry OBE was the head of the Number 10 Policy Unit for British prime minister Gordon Brown. After leaving Number 10, he became director of the economics division of FTI Consulting, then in 2011 head of the think tank New Philanthropy Capital.

Dan's maternal family came from Brick Lane in the east end of London, and he followed his father Bernard Corry into economics. In addition to working at senior levels of government, Corry was senior economist at the Institute for Public Policy Research in the 1990s and ran the New Local Government Network think tank from 2002 until 2005.

Corry began his career in the civil service as a labour market economist at the Department of Employment, then worked at HM Treasury from 1986 to 1989. He was a special adviser at the Department of Trade and Industry from 1997 to 2001. Then he was at the Department of Transport, Local Government and the Regions from 2001 to 2002, special adviser in the Department for Education and Skills (United Kingdom) from 2005 to 2006 and the Department of Communities and Local Government in 2006.

Corry was Chair of the Council of Economic Advisers in HM Treasury from 2006 to 2007, then Director of the Number 10 Policy Unit from 2007 to 2008. He was Senior Adviser on the Economy to the Prime Minister Gordon Brown from 2007 to 2010.

During his time as a special adviser in the nineties he found himself at the heart of allegations that the government tried to smear survivors of the Ladbroke Grove rail crash.

Dan is a Visiting Fellow at Southampton University and a trustee of the Spitalfields Centre Charity Trust. Other posts have included membership of the Greater Manchester Economic Advisory Panel, the Research Committee of the Economic and Social Research Council and the Advisory Board of CentreForum.

Corry was appointed an Officer of the Order of the British Empire (OBE) in the 2026 New Year Honours for public service.

Government offices
Preceded by David Bennett	Number 10 Policy Unit; 2007–2008	Succeeded by Nick Pearce
