= Stuart Ingham =

British political adviser (born 1987)

Director of the Number 10 Policy Unit
- Incumbent
- Assumed office 5 July 2024
- Prime Minister: Keir Starmer
- Preceded by: Eleanor Shawcross

Personal details
- Born: 9 October 1987 (age 38)
- Party: Labour
- Spouse: Jess Leigh
- Education: Manshead CE Academy; University of Oxford (BA); University of Exeter (PhD)

Stuart Ingham (born 9 October 1987) is a British political adviser who has served as Director of the Number 10 Policy Unit since July 2024.

== Early life and education ==
Stuart Ingham was born on 9 October 1987 and attended Manshead CE Academy in Dunstable. He obtained a BA in PPE from the University of Oxford and a PhD in politics from the University of Exeter.

== Career ==
From 2009 to 2010, Ingham worked as a parliamentary intern and campaign assistant to Member of Parliament (MP) Michael Foster. From 2011 to 2014, he worked as an associate lecturer in politics at the University of Exeter.

=== Under Starmer ===
Ingham worked on Keir Starmer's leadership campaign in the 2020 Labour leadership election, and was subsequently appointed to work in the policy team of the Labour party after Starmer was elected as leader. He later became the executive director of policy at the Labour Party. Following changes to Starmer's personnel by October 2023, Ingham was the only original member of Starmer's office still a member of the team. He has been described as a "longstanding Starmer ally" by The Guardian.

After Labour returned to power following the 2024 general election, Ingham was appointed the Director of the Number 10 Policy Unit under Starmer in July 2024. He was also appointed a Special Adviser to the Prime Minister.

== Personal life ==
Ingham's wife, Jess Leigh, works in the Labour party's press office. They were ranked as the tenth most powerful political couple in the United Kingdom in 2023 by Politico.

== See also ==
- Starmer ministry
