= Andy Heath =

Andy Heath may refer to:

- Andy Heath (music executive) (born 1947), British music publishing executive
- Andy Heath (puppeteer), British television puppeteer
