= Pick for Britain =

UK fruit and vegetable harvesting campaign

Pick for Britain was a 2020 campaign launched by the Department for Environment, Food and Rural Affairs of the Government of the United Kingdom and British food industry to encourage UK citizens to help with the harvesting of fruit and vegetable crops during the COVID-19 pandemic.

In the years preceding 2020 UK farmers had increasingly relied on as many as 50,000 to 60,000 migrant workers to harvest crops, but because of a labour shortage initially caused by withdrawal of the United Kingdom from the European Union and precipitated by measures introduced to control the pandemic the sourcing of workers from overseas became extremely difficult. The campaign was launched to recruit fruit and vegetable pickers from the UK and aimed at workers furloughed from their regular jobs. A website, pickforbritain.org, was also launched, together with an advertising campaign supported by the broadcaster ITV and supermarket retailer Waitrose. Although some people initially came forward to offer their help, it was estimated that a "food army" of 40,000 people would be needed in order to prevent unharvested crops from being spoiled.

The campaign was ultimately scrapped in 2021, with an estimate of only 5-11% of Britons taking up the 70,000 harvesting roles in 2020. Environment Secretary George Eustice was criticised by Members of Parliament and farmers unions for overstating the impact of the programme. Shortages of goods in supermarkets would eventually take hold in mid-2021.

== See also ==
- Women's Land Army (World War II)
- Victory garden
