= Munira Mirza =

British political adviser (born 1978)

Director of the Number 10 Policy Unit
- In office 24 July 2019 – 3 February 2022
- Prime Minister: Boris Johnson
- Preceded by: James Marshall
- Succeeded by: Andrew Griffith

Personal details
- Born: May 1978 (age 48) Oldham, Greater Manchester, England
- Spouse: Dougie Smith (m. 2008)
- Children: 1

Academic background
- Education: Breeze Hill School; Oldham Sixth Form College
- Alma mater: Mansfield College, Oxford (BA); University of Kent (MA, PhD)
- Thesis: Between Universalism and Diversity: Contradictions of Local Cultural Policy in Tower Hamlets and Oldham (2009)
- Doctoral advisor: Frank Furedi, founder of the Revolutionary Communist Party

Munira Mirza (born May 1978) is a British political advisor who served as Director of the Number 10 Policy Unit under Prime Minister Boris Johnson from 2019 until she resigned in February 2022. She previously worked under Johnson as Deputy Mayor for Education and Culture when he was Mayor of London.

== Early life and education ==
Mirza was born in Oldham, Greater Manchester, England. Her family came to the United Kingdom from Pakistan; her father found work in a factory while her mother was a housewife and taught Urdu part-time. She had two older brothers and an older sister. Mirza went to Breeze Hill School until 16, then moved to Oldham Sixth Form College for her A-levels. She was the only pupil in her Sixth Form college to gain a place at Oxford University, where she read English Literature at Mansfield College, graduating in 1999. In 2004 she received a Master of Arts in Social Research at the University of Kent followed in 2009 by a PhD in Sociology under Frank Furedi who was the founder of the extreme leftist militant Trotskyite Revolutionary Communist Party .

== Career ==
Early on, Mirza was involved in revolutionary politics, including being a member of the Revolutionary Communist Party, nominally a militant Trotskyist vanguardist communist party that dissolved in 1997.RCP was distinguished by its contrarianism; among its positions were support for IRA and Saddam Hussein. She contributed to its magazine, Living Marxism, which was dissolved after losing a libel case to ITN over Living Marxism's claim that there had been no Bosnian genocide. Staff from Living Marxism later formed the conservative right wing-right libertarian Spiked website, for which she has also written articles.

Many of Mirza's Revolutionary Communist Party colleagues became highly influential in Conservative Party Eurosceptic circles after the dissolution of their party, while remaining closely associated with each other's endeavours.

According to Mirza, after a job with Royal Society of Arts she sought a PhD in Sociology. She also worked briefly at the Tate Gallery. Munira Mirza was also the founder of Heni Talks, which is a non-profit organisation that supports arts education in the UK and the world. In an interview with the art journal Metal, Mirza reflected that “whilst I was at Tate (art gallery)…I conducted a piece of research for them examining the lack of diversity in their curatorial teams and realised early on that this was partly due to the lack of art history education in British schools… After discussing the issue with my Heni colleagues, we realised we had the capacity and skills to do something to help popularise the subject and bring it into the 21st century.”

During 2005 to 2007, Mirza worked as Development Director for the conservative think-tank Policy Exchange. While she was there, she edited a collection of essays, Culture Vultures: Is UK Arts Policy Damaging the Arts?, which challenged the government's efforts to promote socially inclusive arts, and wrote Living Apart Together: British Muslims and the Paradox of Multiculturalism.

In December 2009, she appeared in the BBC Radio 4 programme Great Lives, nominating the political philosopher Hannah Arendt.

From 2008 to 2016, Mirza worked for the Mayor of London, Boris Johnson, initially as Cultural Adviser, and Director of Arts, Culture and the Creative Industries. From 2012, she was one of six Deputy Mayors, being Deputy Mayor for Education and Culture. She advised the Mayor on priorities for culture and education and led the delivery of key programmes, including £40m education and youth investment in London. In 2014, Mirza said that she was not a Conservative.

Her book The Politics of Culture: The Case for Universalism was published by Palgrave Macmillan in 2012. In it, she argued that consensus about the value of cultural diversity had bred ambivalence.

In 2016, Mirza was a vocal advocate of Brexit, a stance which, in cultural circles, she later described as "the new being gay". She said the referendum result was achieved through a process of democracy that, in some way, echoed Magna Carta.

In 2018, Mirza was mentioned by the New Statesman as a possible Conservative Party candidate for the 2020 London mayoral election.

In January 2019, she joined King's College London as Executive Director of Culture, leading the institution's cultural strategy together with oversight of the Science Gallery London at Guy's Campus.

On 24 July 2019, following her former boss Boris Johnson becoming Prime Minister, Mirza was appointed Director of the Number 10 Policy Unit, replacing James Marshall. Mirza drafted financial policy in this role.

In 2020, Boris Johnson named her as one of the five women whom he "most admires".

In November 2020, ITV political editor Robert Peston said in The Spectator that calls for the BBC's "cultural re-education", which many assumed came from Johnson's former adviser Dominic Cummings, actually came from Mirza and her husband.

On 3 February 2022, she resigned as Johnson's adviser, citing comments he had made in the House of Commons, accusing the Labour leader Keir Starmer of being responsible for failing to prosecute the paedophile Jimmy Savile – claims which the BBC described as "widely debunked". In her letter of resignation she stated "There was no fair or reasonable basis for that assertion. This was not the usual cut and thrust of politics; it was an inappropriate and partisan reference to a horrendous case of child sex abuse." She was succeeded by Andrew Griffith.

=== Arts involvements ===
Mirza is a member of Arts Council England, London Area Council; and the board of the Institute of Contemporary Arts. She is also a member of the board at the Royal Opera House and the Illuminated River Foundation. She is the director of HENI Talks, a non-profit initiative to promote art history online. Mirza has a record of advocating for public investment in the arts, but has also warned that organisations will need to become "more entrepreneurial and look for ways to stretch their resources", including through corporate sponsorship.

=== Views on multiculturalism and racism ===
In 2006, Mirza was critical of the multiculturalism encouraged by New Labour, claiming that it accentuated differences between groups, encouraging conflict; she stated that treating people differently "fuels a sense of exclusion". Writing in The Spectator in 2017, Mirza described the anti-racism movement as a "bogus moral crusade" imported from the US, "...with its demented campus dramas and neuroses about 'safe spaces', 'micro-aggressions' and 'cultural appropriation'".

She has attracted criticism for saying that "it seems that a lot of people in politics think it's a good idea to exaggerate the problem of racism", noting that Theresa May's proposed racial disparities audit for public services set the scene for "another bout of political self-flagellation regarding the subject of race in Britain", whilst "accusations of institutional racism – and their official endorsement – have corroded BAME communities' trust in public services, thereby making things worse." As well as calling May's racial disparities audit a "phoney race war", Mirza also described The Lammy Review of 2017 into the treatment of BAME groups in the justice system as "wrongheaded" and "misleading".

On Boris Johnson's column criticising Denmark for banning the burqa, in which he likened the garment's wearers to 'bank robbers' and 'letterboxes', she said "there are many people in this country who are uncomfortable about the burqa. When people argue we should use more sensitive language what they are really saying is let's not be critical at all, let's not offend, let's not criticise this practice because it upsets Muslims", further defending Johnson's comments as "reasoned, balanced and thoughtful".

In 2020, The Guardian reported that in 2019, "Mirza co-authored the Conservative manifesto," commenting that Mirza was “probably ( Boris ) Johnson’s most important adviser after Cummings”, and in an article for Grazia magazine in 2020, Boris Johnson called Mirza “extraordinary”, “ruthless”, and one of “the five women who have shaped my life”.

Regarding the Windrush scandal, Mirza claimed that "the real lesson is not one of racism, as in the deliberate targeting of ethnic minority groups, rather it is that the process of immigration enforcement needs to be improved".

In an article for the right libertarian Spiked magazine in 2017, Munira Mirza stated that she sees institutional racism as "a perception more than a reality".

In June 2020, following the George Floyd protests, Mirza was asked to establish the Commission on Race and Ethnic Disparities. Her involvement attracted controversy, given her doubts about the existence of institutional racism and her criticism of previous reports on race relations.

== Personal life ==
In 2008, Mirza married Conservative political advisor Dougie Smith. They have a son, Robbie (born 2013).
