= Mark Spencer (British politician) =

British Conservative politician (born 1970)

The Right Honourable Sir Mark Spencer
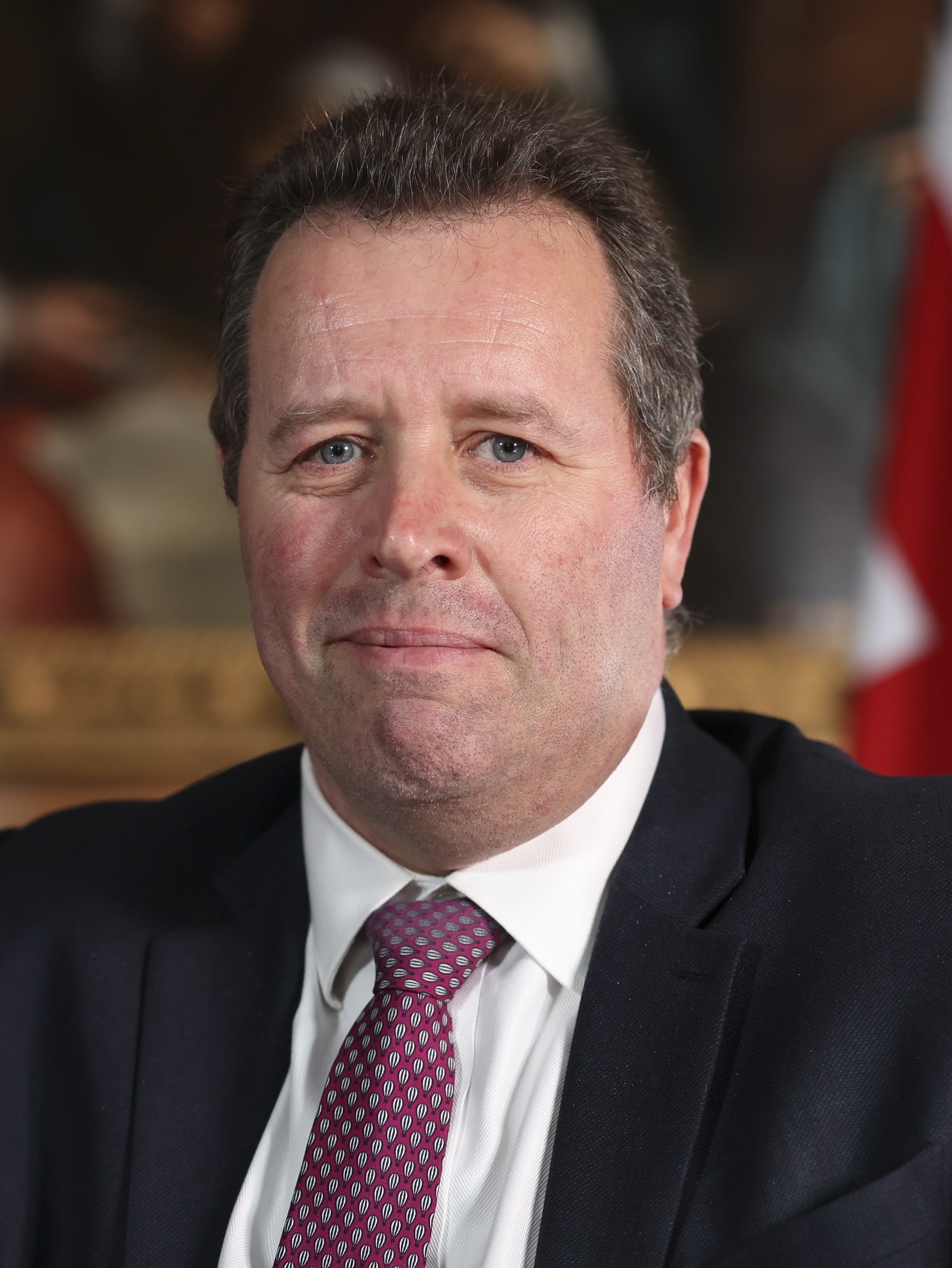
- Official portrait, 2021

Minister of State for Food, Farming and Fisheries (Note: Minister of State for Food (September to October 2022))
- In office 7 September 2022 – 5 July 2024
- Prime Minister: Liz Truss; Rishi Sunak
- Preceded by: Victoria Prentis
- Succeeded by: Daniel Zeichner

Leader of the House of Commons Lord President of the Council
- In office 8 February 2022 – 6 September 2022
- Prime Minister: Boris Johnson
- Preceded by: Jacob Rees-Mogg
- Succeeded by: Penny Mordaunt

Government Chief Whip in the House of Commons Parliamentary Secretary to the Treasury
- In office 24 July 2019 – 8 February 2022
- Prime Minister: Boris Johnson
- Preceded by: Julian Smith
- Succeeded by: Chris Heaton-Harris

Comptroller of the Household
- In office 15 July 2018 – 24 July 2019
- Prime Minister: Theresa May
- Preceded by: Chris Heaton-Harris
- Succeeded by: Jeremy Quin

Deputy Leader of the House of Commons
- In office 15 July 2018 – 24 July 2019
- Prime Minister: Theresa May
- Preceded by: Chris Heaton-Harris
- Succeeded by: Peter Bone (2022)

Vice-Chamberlain of the Household
- In office 10 January 2018 – 15 July 2018
- Prime Minister: Theresa May
- Preceded by: Chris Heaton-Harris
- Succeeded by: Andrew Stephenson

Lord Commissioner of the Treasury
- In office 15 June 2017 – 9 January 2018
- Prime Minister: Theresa May
- Preceded by: Robert Syms
- Succeeded by: Craig Whittaker

Member of Parliament for Sherwood
- In office 6 May 2010 – 30 May 2024
- Preceded by: Paddy Tipping
- Succeeded by: Michelle Welsh

Personal details
- Born: 20 January 1970 (age 56) Nottinghamshire, England
- Party: Conservative
- Website: markspencer.org.uk

Sir Mark Steven Spencer (born 20 January 1970) is a British politician who served as Minister of State for Food, Farming and Fisheries between 2022 and 2024. He previously served as Leader of the House of Commons and Lord President of the Council from February to September 2022 and as Chief Whip from 2019 to 2022. A member of the Conservative Party, he served as Member of Parliament (MP) for Sherwood from 2010 until 2024, when he lost his seat in the 2024 General election.

== Early life ==
Spencer was born on 20 January 1970. He attended Lambley Primary School and the Colonel Frank Seely School in Calverton, Nottinghamshire. He then qualified at Shuttleworth Agricultural College in Bedfordshire, before joining the family farm business. A former dairy farm, the business diversified into growing potatoes and vegetables and producing free-range eggs, beef and lamb, and employing around 50 local people. Spencer was chairman of the National Federation of Young Farmers' Clubs from 1999 to 2000. Spencer was a trustee of the Royal Agricultural Society of England and for three years, the honorary show director of the Royal Show. Additionally, he is a fellow of the Royal Agricultural Society.

Spencer is a past vice-chairman of school governors of Woodborough Woods Foundation School, where he was chairman of the Disciplinary Committee. As chairman of the Lambley Playground Fund, he helped raise over £100,000 to provide new play equipment in the village and he is also trustee of the Core Centre Calverton, an adult education centre. Spencer is the President of Bilsthorpe Heritage Museum.

In May 2001, Spencer unsuccessfully stood as a Conservative Party candidate for the Nottinghamshire County Council seat of Hucknall. However, in 2003 he gained the third seat in the safe Conservative ward of Ravenshead on Gedling District Council; he retained this seat at the local elections in 2007. In 2005, Spencer contested a different ward for the Nottinghamshire County Council elections and won the seat of Calverton for the Conservatives; he retained this seat at the local elections in 2009 with an increased majority. In 2006, Spencer was appointed Shadow Spokesman for Community Safety and Partnership for Nottinghamshire County Council.

== Parliamentary career ==
Spencer gained the Sherwood seat from Labour at the 2010 general election with a majority of 214, after the sitting Labour MP Paddy Tipping stood down. Spencer was re-elected in 2015 and 2017. Following his election as an MP he stood down as a borough councillor and county councillor before the next local elections in 2011 and 2013 respectively.

In Parliament, Spencer has served on the Environmental Audit Committee, the Environment, Food and Rural Affairs Committee, the Backbench Business Committee, and on the Selection Committee. He formerly served as Parliamentary Private Secretary to Secretary of State for Environment, Food and Rural Affairs Liz Truss, and was appointed Assistant Government Whip on 17 July 2016, before becoming a full government whip in June 2017.

He worked on environmental issues and energy security through his roles on the Environmental Audit Committee and the Environment, Food and Rural Affairs Committee. With his farming background, Spencer has also focused in Parliament on agriculture and rural communities, with an interest in ensuring that British food production is recognised and promoted as "world class". He joined the Coalfield Communities All Party Parliamentary Group (APPG), whose aim is to restore the economies of former coalfield areas. Spencer was named the Brake Road Safety Parliamentarian of the Year 2011 for campaigning for improved road safety on the A614.

Spencer attracted criticism in February 2015 after appearing to defend a benefits system which, according to Labour MP Lisa Nandy, left a job seeker with learning disabilities unable to afford food or electricity because he was four minutes late for a job centre appointment. In response to Nandy, Spencer said: "It is important that those seeking employment learn the discipline of timekeeping, which is an important part of securing and keeping a job". Writing in The Spectator magazine, Isabel Hardman criticised his response, suggesting his rush to defend government policy without showing concern for the constituent was an example of "political tribalism at its worst". Spencer said that critics had "twisted what he said", and stood by his comments that "normal people doing normal jobs, if they turn up late they would get their wages docked".

The Telegraph reported in August 2015 that Spencer, in a letter to a constituent, had suggested that Extremism Disruption Orders (EDOs) could be used against Christian teachers who tell schoolchildren that same-sex marriage is wrong. He wrote that whilst Christians with traditionalist views are "perfectly entitled to express their views", "The EDOs, in this case, would apply to a situation where a teacher was specifically teaching that gay marriage is wrong". Simon Calvert, deputy director of the Christian Institute, an evangelical pressure group, responded: "I am genuinely shocked that we have an MP supporting the idea of teachers being branded extremists for teaching that marriage is between a man and a woman".

In May 2016, it emerged that Spencer was one of a number of Conservative MPs being investigated by police in the 2015 general election party spending investigation, for allegedly spending more than the legal limit on constituency election campaign expenses. In May 2017, the Crown Prosecution Service said that while there was evidence of inaccurate spending returns, it did not "meet the test" for further action.

As a backbench MP, Spencer chose to support the official position of the Government and campaigned for the United Kingdom to remain in the European Union before the EU membership referendum on 23 June 2016. After the result was announced, Spencer continued to support the party leadership and advocated leaving the European Union.

Spencer was criticised in 2017 by the Parliamentary Commissioner for Standards for misusing taxpayers' resources, such as the MPs' newsletter, to link to "overtly party political content". Spencer apologised and a member of his staff, Ben Bradley, was sent on a training course on how to appropriately use parliamentary resources.

Spencer was made Chief Whip on 24 July 2019 under Prime Minister Boris Johnson. He was appointed to the Privy Council the next day.

On 1 August 2020, a Conservative MP was arrested on charges of sexual assault. The Sunday Times reported that Spencer, as Chief Whip, was told of the alleged incident a month before the arrest, and did not take action. Spencer said that when the victim came forward to him, there was mention of abuse and other threatful behaviour, but no mention of sexual assault.

Spencer was appointed Knight Bachelor in March 2024 for parliamentary and public service.

== Post-parliamentary career ==
Following his defeat at the 2024 UK General Election, Spencer was appointed as Vice-President at Newcastle University Farms, and a non-executive Director at the Nottinghamshire Agricultural Society.

On 14 November 2026, Spencer was selected as the Conservative candidate for Newark, after incumbent MP Robert Jenrick defected from the Conservative Party to Reform UK that January.

== Personal life ==
Spencer lives with his wife and children in Mapperley Plains in Nottinghamshire. The couple manage a family farm.

== Notes ==
Parliament of the United Kingdom
Preceded by Paddy Tipping	Member of Parliament for Sherwood; 2010–2024	Succeeded by Michelle Welsh
Political offices
Preceded by Robert Syms	Lord Commissioner of the Treasury; 2017–2018	Succeeded by Craig Whittaker
Preceded by Chris Heaton-Harris	Vice-Chamberlain of the Household; 2018	Succeeded by Andrew Stephenson
Preceded by Chris Heaton-Harris	Deputy Leader of the House of Commons; 2018–2019	Vacant
Preceded by Chris Heaton-Harris	Comptroller of the Household; 2018–2019	Succeeded by Jeremy Quin
Preceded by Julian Smith	Government Chief Whip in the House of Commons; 2019–2022	Succeeded by Chris Heaton-Harris
Preceded by Julian Smith	Parliamentary Secretary to the Treasury; 2019–2022	Succeeded by Chris Heaton-Harris
Preceded by Jacob Rees-Mogg	Leader of the House of Commons; 2022	Succeeded by Penny Mordaunt
Preceded by Jacob Rees-Mogg	Lord President of the Council; 2022	Succeeded by Penny Mordaunt
Party political offices
Preceded by Julian Smith	Conservative Chief Whip in the House of Commons; 2019–2022	Succeeded by Chris Heaton-Harris
