= Breeze Hill School =

Location
- Roxbury Avenue; Salem; Oldham, Greater Manchester, OL4 5JE; England; 53.5348°N 2.0824°W

Information
- Type: Community school
- Motto: Language for Life
- Established: 1960
- Closed: 2010 (now Waterhead Academy
- Local authority: Oldham
- Department for Education URN: 105731 Tables
- Ofsted: Reports
- Gender: Mixed
- Age: 11 to 16

Breeze Hill School was a mixed-sex comprehensive secondary school for 11- to 16-year-olds in Oldham, Greater Manchester, England. It was a specialist Humanities College, and served over 750 students. Bernard Phillips was the last headteacher of Breeze Hill School before it merged with neighbouring Counthill School to form the Waterhead Academy. Since the school lay in the heart of Oldham's Pakistani Asian community, since the late 80's Early 90's Asian population growth in the local area led to the majority of students being of Asian descent when the school finally closed.

== Campus ==
The Breeze Hill School campus contained two main teaching blocks. The Year 7 Base was for new arrivals, and was created to ease the transition between primary and secondary school. The main teaching block served students from Year 8 onwards. Breeze Hill had intensive playing fields and an Astro-turf pitch, used for various sports both by students from the school and by the local community.

== History ==
In May 2001, a racially motivated attack outside Breeze Hill School began a series of events that escalated into a five-day period of rioting known as the Oldham Riots.

On 31 August 2010, Breeze Hill School and Counthill School merged to become the Waterhead Academy. The campus was renamed Roxbury Campus until the academy moved to a third location in November 2012.

== Notable alumni ==
- John Lees (musician), founder of English rock band Barclay James Harvest
- Munira Mirza, Director of Number 10 Policy Unit
