= Dougie Smith =

British political advisor (born 1962)

- Born: May 1962 (age 63); Scotland
- Occupation: Political advisor
- Spouse: Munira Mirza (m. 2008)
- Children: 1

Douglas Smith (born May 1962) is a British political advisor who has worked as a senior Conservative Party aide for British prime ministers David Cameron, Theresa May and Boris Johnson, although according to The Daily Telegraph his precise role is uncertain. He was formerly a political advisor to Sir James Mancham, former President of Seychelles, and Sir James Goldsmith.

== Early life and education ==
Smith was born in May 1962 in Scotland. His father, Malcolm Smith, ran a business making life jackets and other nautical equipment.

He studied at the University of Strathclyde but dropped out before completing his degree. While at university in 1985, Smith was elected vice-chairman of the Federation of Conservative Students (FCS); however, his election was declared null and void as he had incorrectly claimed to be a student at Napier Technical College. He was arrested for allegedly threatening to kill fellow FCS member Toby Baxendale. Smith was a leading member of FCS's libertarian faction, however the FCS was disbanded in 1986 by then party chairman Norman Tebbit who, according to The Daily Telegraph, "decided it was too Right-wing even for him".

== Career ==
Smith previously worked at the think tank the Adam Smith Institute, and later the Committee for a Free Britain and Sir James Goldsmith's Referendum Party. He was formerly a political advisor to former President of Seychelles Sir James Mancham. He served as an advisor to numerous senior right-wing figures including Sir James Goldsmith, and wrote speeches for a number of Conservative Members of Parliament. Smith was the co-ordinator of Conservatives for Change (Cchange), a Tory think tank founded in 2002. He is a Eurosceptic.

For at least five years from 1998, he ran Fever Parties, an organisation which hosted "five-star" swinger parties. When this knowledge became public, he asserted that his private and political activities did not overlap.

A senior Conservative Party aide, he worked as a speechwriter for David Cameron and a Tory party headquarter's activist under Theresa May, before later working for Boris Johnson in an unknown role.

In 2019, Nigel Farage, then the Leader of the Brexit Party, alleged that Smith was involved in intimidation and offering bribes in exchange for political candidates stepping down.

According to former cabinet member Nadine Dorries, in her 2023 book The Plot, Smith is a member of a small and influential group of men seeking to control the activities of the Conservative Party from within.

== Personal life ==
Smith married Munira Mirza, a political advisor and long-time ally of Boris Johnson, in 2008. They have a son, Robbie, born in 2013.
