= Jo Dipple =

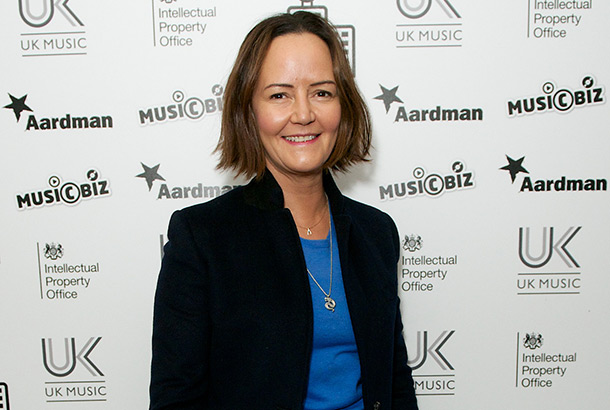
Jo Dipple

Joanna Shannon Dipple (born 5 June 1968) has been SVP Public Affairs at Live Nation Entertainment since 2017.

The granddaughter of Thomas Burdett Money-Coutts, 7th Baron Latymer she was educated at Benenden School and the University of East Anglia. First editing the Dear Jo letters page for the Daily Mirror from 1995 to 2000, she was then head of public affairs for Trinity Mirror from 2000 to 2006. She was then a special adviser at HM Treasury from 2006 to 2007, and a special adviser to Prime Minister Gordon Brown from 2007 to 2008. She worked at UK Music from 2008 to 2017, first at Director of Government Affairs, then subsequently as CEO.
