= Victoria Prentis =

British politician and barrister (born 1971)

The Right Honourable The Baroness Prentis of Banbury PC KC
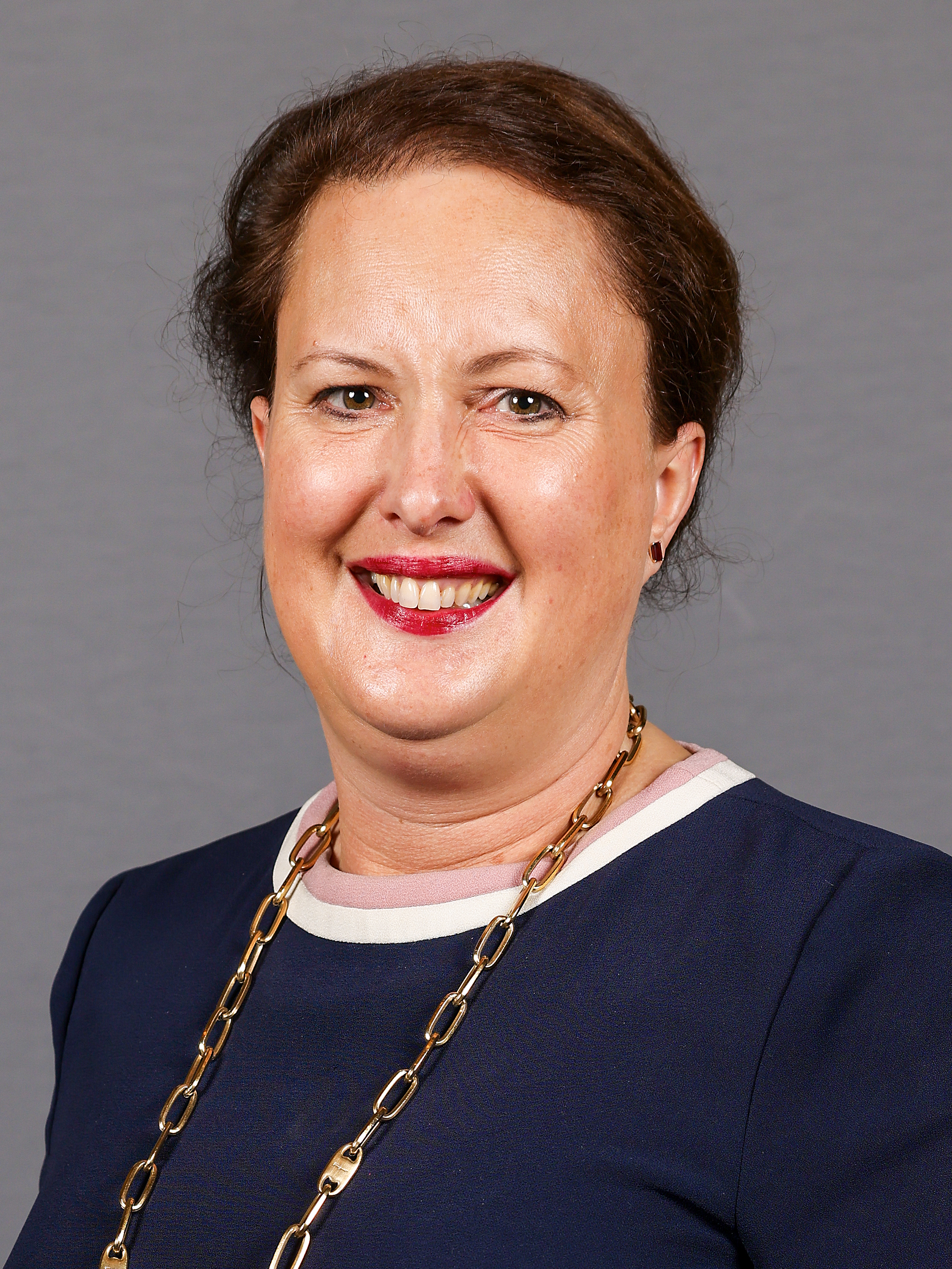
- Official portrait, 2022

Attorney General for England and Wales Advocate General for Northern Ireland
- In office 25 October 2022 – 5 July 2024
- Prime Minister: Rishi Sunak
- Preceded by: Michael Ellis
- Succeeded by: The Lord Hermer

Minister of State for Work and Welfare
- In office 7 September 2022 – 25 October 2022
- Prime Minister: Liz Truss
- Preceded by: Julie Marson
- Succeeded by: Guy Opperman

Minister of State for Farming, Fisheries and Food (Note: Parliamentary Under-Secretary of State from 2020 to September 2021.)
- In office 14 February 2020 – 7 September 2022
- Prime Minister: Boris Johnson
- Preceded by: George Eustice
- Succeeded by: Mark Spencer

Member of the House of Lords
- Lord Temporal
- Life peerage 13 May 2025

Member of Parliament for Banbury
- In office 7 May 2015 – 30 May 2024
- Preceded by: Tony Baldry
- Succeeded by: Sean Woodcock

Personal details
- Born: Victoria Mary Boswell; 24 March 1971 (age 55) Banbury, Oxfordshire, England
- Party: Conservative
- Spouse: Sebastian Prentis
- Parent: Lord Boswell of Aynho (father)
- Education: Royal Holloway, University of London (BA); Downing College, Cambridge (BA)
- Website: Official website

Victoria Mary Prentis, Baroness Prentis of Banbury (née Boswell; born 24 March 1971) is a British politician and barrister. A member of the Conservative Party, Prentis served as the Member of Parliament for Banbury from 2015 until her defeat in 2024. She was made a life peer in 2025.

Prentis was appointed Parliamentary Under-Secretary of State for Farming, Fisheries and Food in February 2020, and was promoted to become Minister of State for Farming, Fisheries and Food in September 2021, during the second cabinet reshuffle of the second Johnson ministry. She was appointed Minister of State for Work and Welfare by Prime Minister Liz Truss in September 2022. After Liz Truss resigned and Rishi Sunak became Prime Minister, Prentis was appointed Attorney General for England and Wales, being appointed to the Privy Council on 27 October 2022. She served in the position until her defeat in the 2024 general election. She was nominated for a life peerage in the 2024 Prime Minister's Resignation Honours.

== Early life and career ==
Prentis was born Victoria Boswell, in Banbury, and grew up on the family farm in nearby Aynho. She has two sisters. She was educated at Royal Holloway, University of London and Downing College, Cambridge, gaining degrees in English and Law respectively. She is the daughter of Lord Boswell of Aynho, who was MP for Daventry from 1987 to 2010.

Prentis qualified as a barrister in 1995. She joined the Civil Service in 1997, leaving in November 2014. Her last job for the government was co-leading (in a jobshare) the "Justice and Security team" at the Treasury Solicitor's Department.

== Parliamentary career ==
In November 2014, Prentis was selected as the Conservative candidate for the Banbury constituency at the 2015 general election. She retained the safe seat for the Conservatives (held by them since 1922). In Parliament she sat on the Justice Select Committee and the Select Committee on Statutory Instruments. Prentis is an opponent of High Speed 2, believing it will affect her constituency. She rebelled against the Conservative government when the HS2 Bill received its second reading in the House of Commons in March 2016.

Prentis was a founding supporter of Conservatives for Reform in Europe, a group which campaigned in support of the UK's membership of a reformed European Union. Accordingly, she declared that she would vote remain in the 2016 referendum on the UK's membership of the EU.

Prentis supported Theresa May's candidacy during the 2016 Conservative leadership contest. She was appointed Parliamentary Private Secretary to junior ministers in the Department for Transport in July 2016.

She was re-elected as the MP for Banbury in the 2017 general election.

In May 2019, she endorsed candidate Rory Stewart for the leadership of the Conservative Party.

Prentis stated that she voted to remain in the European Union but had since given her support to Boris Johnson's deal.

In February 2020, Prentis joined the Department for Environment, Food and Rural Affairs as the Parliamentary Under-Secretary of State for Farming, Fisheries and Food.

In January 2021, Prentis said during an interview that her jaw did not drop when she read the EU–UK Trade and Cooperation Agreement which includes farming, fisheries and food because she was "very busy organising the local nativity trail". She voted in favour of the agreement in-line with government policy.

In March 2022, Prentis was the first British MP to take a Ukrainian refugee in her house amidst the Russian invasion of Ukraine.

On 7 September, Prentis was appointed Minister of State for Work and Welfare at the Department for Work and Pensions by Prime Minister Liz Truss in the Truss Ministry.

Victoria Prentis was defeated by Labour candidate Sean Woodcock at the 2024 general election, one of many Conservative Cabinet ministers to lose their seat. Banbury had been consistently represented by a Conservative MP from 1922 until 2024.

=== Attorney General ===
Following the appointment of Rishi Sunak as Prime Minister on 25 October 2022, Prentis was appointed by him as Attorney General for England and Wales and was officially sworn in as such on 16 November 2022. She was appointed to the Privy Council on 27 October 2022 and sworn of it on 14 December 2022. As is tradition for those appointed as Attorney General who are not already King's Counsel, Prentis was appointed as King's Counsel on 23 November 2022.

Prentis made an official visit to Israel and the Occupied Palestinian Territories in February 2024.

=== House of Lords ===
Prentis received a life peerage as part of the 2024 Prime Minister's Resignation Honours and was created Baroness Prentis of Banbury, of Somerton in the County of Oxfordshire on 13 May 2025. She made her maiden speech on Monday 30 June 2025 during a debate on the Chagos Archipelago, and was immediately followed by the valedictory speech of her father Lord Boswell of Aynho.

== Personal life ==
Prentis is married to Sebastian Prentis, an Insolvency and Companies Court Judge, whom she met when they were both students at the University of Cambridge. The couple have two daughters and live in Somerton, Oxfordshire. During debates about the assisted dying bill, she mentions she got diagnosed with cancer and was getting chemotherapy.

== Notes ==
Parliament of the United Kingdom
Preceded by Tony Baldry	Member of Parliament for Banbury; 2015–2024	Succeeded by Sean Woodcock
Political offices
Preceded by George Eustice as Minister of State for Agriculture, Fisheries and Food	Parliamentary Under-Secretary of State for Farming, Fisheries and Food; 2020–2022	Succeeded by Mark Spencer as Minister of State for Food
Preceded by Michael Ellis	Attorney General for England and Wales; 2022–2024	Succeeded by Richard Hermer
Preceded by Michael Ellis	Advocate General for Northern Ireland; 2022–2024	Succeeded by Richard Hermer
