= 2024 Prime Minister's Resignation Honours =

British honours

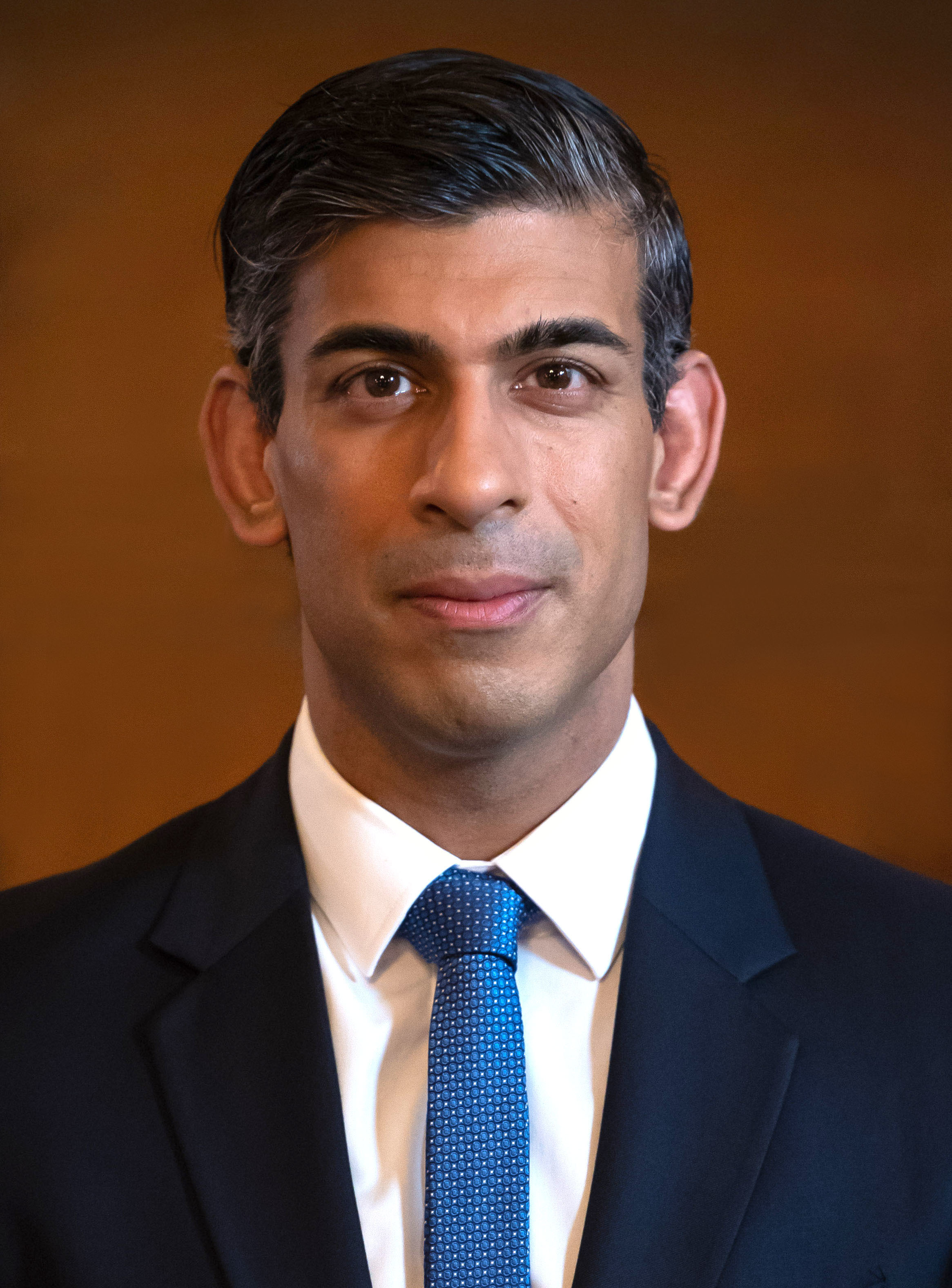
Sunak during his Premiership

The 2024 Prime Minister's Resignation Honours are honours awarded following the July 2024 resignation of the Prime Minister, Rishi Sunak. They were published on 11 April 2025, and formally gazetted on 25 July 2025.

== Life peerages ==
- The Rt Hon Michael Gove – Former Secretary of State for Levelling Up, Housing and Communities; to be Baron Gove, of Torry in the City of Aberdeen – 13 May 2025
- The Rt Hon Mark Harper – Former Secretary of State for Transport; to be Baron Harper, of Forest of Dean in the County of Gloucestershire – 12 May 2025
- The Rt Hon Simon Hart – Former Chief Whip of the House of Commons; to be Baron Hart of Tenby, of Lampeter Velfrey in the County of Pembrokeshire – 28 May 2025
- The Rt Hon Sir Alister William Jack KBE DL – Former Secretary of State for Scotland; to be Baron Jack of Courance, of Courance in the County of Dumfriesshire – 9 May 2025
- Stephen Massey – Former Chief Executive Officer of the Conservative Party; to be Baron Massey of Hampstead, of Lacock in the County of Wiltshire – 12 May 2025
- The Rt Hon Victoria Prentis KC – Former Attorney General; to be Baroness Prentis of Banbury, of Somerton in the County of Oxfordshire – 13 May 2025
- Eleanor Shawcross (Wolfson) – Former Head of the No 10 Policy Unit; to be Baroness Shawcross–Wolfson, of Aspley Guise in the County of Bedfordshire – 28 May 2025

== Knights Bachelor ==
- James Anderson OBE – England Cricketer. For services to cricket.
- The Rt Hon James Cleverly TD VR MP – Former Home Secretary and former Foreign Secretary. For political and public service.
- The Rt Hon Jeremy Hunt MP – Former Chancellor of the Exchequer, Foreign Secretary, Health Secretary and Culture Secretary. For political and public service.
- The Rt Hon Grant Shapps MP – Former Defence Secretary, Energy Secretary, Business Secretary, Home Secretary, and Transport Secretary. For political and public service.
- The Rt Hon Mel Stride MP – Former Secretary of State for Work and Pensions. For political and public service.
- Matthew Vaughn – Filmmaker. For services to the creative industries.

== Order of the Bath ==
=== Companion in the Most Honourable Order of the Bath (CB) ===
- Elizabeth Perelman – Former Principal Private Secretary to the Prime Minister. For public service.

== Order of St Michael and St George ==
=== Knight Commander of the Most Distinguished Order of St Michael and St George (KCMG) ===
- The Rt Hon Andrew Mitchell MP – Former Secretary of State for International Development and Deputy Foreign Secretary. For political and public service.

=== Companion of the Most Distinguished Order of St Michael and St George (CMG) ===
- The Hon Prof John Bew – Former Foreign Policy Advisor to the Prime Minister. For political and public service.

== Order of the British Empire ==
=== Dames Commander of the Order of the British Empire (DBE) ===
- The Rt Hon Theresa Villiers MP – Former Member of Parliament for Chipping Barnet. For political and public service.

=== Commanders of the Order of the British Empire (CBE) ===
- Nerissa Chesterfield – Former Director of Communications at No10 Downing Street. For political and public service.
- Cassian Horowitz – Former Special Advisor to the Prime Minister. For political and public service.
- Lisa Lovering – Former Head of Operations at No10 Downing Street. For political and public service.
- Will Tanner – Former Deputy Chief of Staff to the Prime Minister. For political and public service.
- Rupert Yorke – Former Deputy Chief of Staff to the Prime Minister. For political and public service.

=== Officers of the Order of the British Empire (OBE) ===
- Eden Barnes – Former Head of Events and Visits at No10 Downing Street. For political and public service.
- Aidan Corley – Former Head of Research and Messaging, 10 Downing Street, and Special Adviser to the Prime Minister. For political and public service.
- Douglas McNeill – Former Chief Economic Advisor to Prime Minister. For political and public service.
- James Nation – Former Deputy Director of the Number 10 Policy Unit. For political and public service.
- Jamie Njoku-Goodwin – Former Special Advisor to the Prime Minister. For political and public service.
- Lucy Noakes – Former Press Secretary to the Prime Minister. For political and public service.
- Timothy Pitt – Former Special Adviser to the Prime Minister. For political and public service.
- Robert Trotter – Former official speechwriter for the Prime Minister. For public service.
- Henry de Zoete – Former adviser to the Prime Minister on Artificial Intelligence. For public service.

=== Members of the Order of the British Empire (MBE) ===
- Ronald Kirk – Former Councillor for Great Ayton, Hambleton District Council. For political and public service.
- George Livesey – Senior Parliamentary Assistant to the Rt Hon Rishi Sunak MP. For political and public service.
- Yvonne Peacock – Councillor for the Upper Dales, North Yorkshire Council. For political and public service.

=== Medallists of the Order of the British Empire (BEM) ===
- David McCormick – Collections Manager at Chequers. For public service.
- Emma Paterson – Head Housekeeper at Chequers. For public service.
