= Daniel Zeichner =

British politician

Daniel Zeichner MP
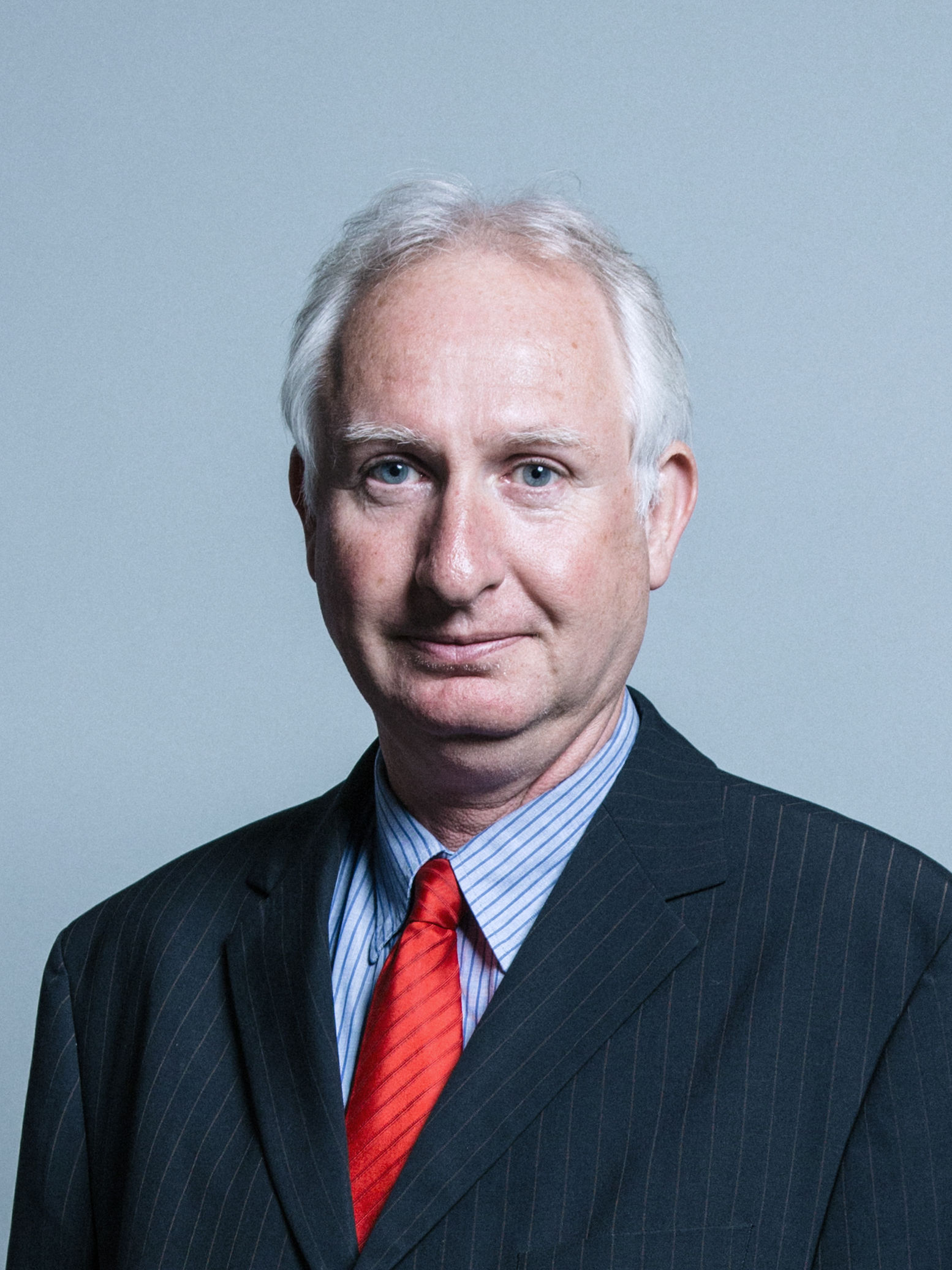
- Official portrait, 2017

Minister of State for Food Security and Rural Affairs
- In office 8 July 2024 – 6 September 2025
- Prime Minister: Keir Starmer
- Preceded by: Mark Spencer
- Succeeded by: Angela Eagle

Member of Parliament for Cambridge
- Incumbent
- Assumed office 7 May 2015
- Preceded by: Julian Huppert
- Majority: 11,078 (26.3%)

Member of South Norfolk District Council for Long Row
- In office 4 May 1995 – 1 May 2003
- Preceded by: D. Mitchell
- Succeeded by: Keith Weeks

Personal details
- Born: Daniel Stephen Zeichner; 9 November 1956 (age 69) Beckenham, Kent, England
- Party: Labour
- Education: King's College, Cambridge
- Website: Official website

Daniel Stephen Zeichner (born 9 November 1956) is a British Labour Party politician who has served as Member of Parliament (MP) for Cambridge since 2015. He served as Minister of State for Food Security and Rural Affairs from 2024 to 2025.

== Early life and career ==
Daniel Zeichner was born on 9 November 1956 in Beckenham. His father was an Austrian political refugee whose family fled Vienna in 1938, and his mother was the descendant of agricultural workers from Cambridgeshire. As a teenager, Zeichner was a middle-distance runner.

He attended Trinity School of John Whitgift, a former grammar school, turned private school. After school, Zeichner went to the University of Cambridge, studying history at King's College. He joined the Labour Party in 1979.

Zeichner's first job after graduation was as a trainee computer programmer, working for Cambridgeshire County Council at the register office next to Shire Hall on Castle Hill, Cambridge. He later worked in IT for a number of companies, including Norwich Union in Norfolk, Philips in East Chesterton and Perkins Engines in Peterborough.

In 1992 Zeichner was hired by Norwich South MP John Garrett, working as press officer and parliamentary assistant for Garrett between 1992 and 1997. He subsequently worked for Garrett's successor, Charles Clarke, until 1999. In 2002 Zeichner began working for the public sector trade union UNISON as a political officer, a post he held until he was elected to Parliament.

== Political career ==
Zeichner has served several terms on Labour's National Policy Forum, the Labour Party's top policy-making body. He was first elected to represent the East of England on the body shortly after it was first established by Tony Blair as part of the "Partnership in Power" process.

He was elected as a councillor in Burston, Norfolk, in 1995, a position in which he served until 2003. During this time Zeichner became leader of the Labour group on South Norfolk District Council.

At the 1997 general election, Zeichner stood as the Labour Party candidate in Mid Norfolk, coming second with 37.3% of the vote behind the Conservative candidate Keith Simpson. He stood again in Mid Norfolk at the 2001 general election, again coming second with 36.1% of the vote behind Keith Simpson. At the 2005 general election, Zeichner again came second in Mid Norfolk, with 29.2% of the vote.

In 2006, Zeichner described his politics as "socialist in a modern context".

In the 2010 Labour leadership election, Zeichner supported Ed Miliband.

== Parliamentary career ==
At the 2010 general election, Zeichner stood in Cambridge, coming third with 24.3% of the vote behind the Liberal Democrat candidate Julian Huppert and the Conservative candidate Nick Hillman.

Zeichner was elected to Parliament as MP for Cambridge at the 2015 general election, with 36% of the vote and a majority of 599. He was appointed as a Shadow Minister for Transport in September 2015, responsible for buses, bikes and walking.

In the 2015 Labour leadership election he supported Yvette Cooper.

In July 2016 Zeichner stated his opposition to the renewal of Trident.

At the snap 2017 general election, Zeichner was re-elected as MP for Cambridge with an increased vote share of 51.9% and an increased majority of 12,661.

In June 2017 Zeichner resigned as a Shadow Transport Minister in order to vote in favour of an amendment to the government's 2017 Queen's Speech supporting the UK's membership of the single market, in defiance of the party whip. The amendment, which was defeated by 322 votes to 101, was tabled by former Shadow Cabinet Minister Chuka Umunna. Zeichner described himself as a "passionate pro-European".

Zeichner was again re-elected at the 2019 general election, with a decreased vote share of 48% and a decreased majority of 9,639.

In January 2020, Zeichner was appointed as a Shadow Farming and Agriculture Minister in the Shadow Department for Environment, Food and Rural Affairs (DEFRA) team. He supported Keir Starmer in the 2020 leadership election. Zeichner remained in the Shadow DEFRA team following Keir Starmer's first reshuffle as Labour leader, but gained the fisheries brief from Ruth Jones MP, as Shadow Food, Farming and Fisheries Minister.

In June 2020, Parliament's Standards and Privileges Committee censured Zeichner for misusing public funds relating to stationery and pre-paid House of Commons envelopes during the 2019 general election campaign.

On 30 August 2021, Keir Starmer announced that Zeichner would become acting Shadow Secretary of State for Environment, Food and Rural Affairs in place of Luke Pollard until the 2021 Labour Party Conference to allow Pollard to spend more time with his community after the Plymouth shooting.

At the 2024 general election, Zeichner was again re-elected, with a decreased vote share of 46.6% and an increased majority of 11,078.

Following the General Election and Labour forming the Government, Zeichner's was appointed as Farming Minister.

In September 2025, Zeichner was relieved of his post as Farming Minister and paid tribute to all those working in the food supply chain in the UK.

== Personal life ==
Zeichner met Barbara "Budge" Ziolkowska, his partner, when he was a student at King's College, Cambridge, in 1976. They live in Comberton, a village five miles (eight kilometres) west of the city of Cambridge.

Parliament of the United Kingdom
Preceded by Julian Huppert	Member of Parliament for Cambridge; 2015–present	Incumbent
