= James Marshall (political adviser) =

James Marshall CBE

Director of the Number 10 Policy Unit
- In office 26 June 2017 – 24 July 2019
- Prime Minister: Theresa May
- Preceded by: John Godfrey
- Succeeded by: Munira Mirza

Personal details
- Born: 1980 (age 45–46)
- Education: Magdalene College, Cambridge
- Profession: Teacher

James Marshall CBE (born 1980) is a former director of the Number 10 Policy Unit.

Marshall was educated at Magdalene College, Cambridge. Before entering politics, he taught English at Shrewsbury School. In 2016 he was employed as a strategic adviser for the construction company, Mace.

In 2011, Marshall was an adviser to the former Leader of the House of Lords, Lord Strathclyde. He has also been an adviser to three of the chief whips in David Cameron's government: George Young, Michael Gove, and Mark Harper.

Theresa May, the Prime Minister, appointed James Marshall as her Director of Policy in June 2017, following his predecessor John Godfrey's resignation.

In July 2019, he was replaced as Director by Munira Mirza, by new Prime Minister Boris Johnson.

== See also ==
- Downing Street Policy Unit
- Prime Minister's Office

Government offices
Preceded by John Godfrey	Director of the Number 10 Policy Unit; 2017–2019	Succeeded by Munira Mirza
