= Waterhead Academy =

Location
- Huddersfield Road; Oldham, Greater Manchester, OL4 3NY; England; 53.5505°N 2.0719°W

Information
- Type: Academy
- Established: 2010
- Closed: 2026
- Local authority: Oldham Council
- Trust: South Pennine Academies
- Department for Education URN: 144508 Tables
- Ofsted: Reports
- Principal: Mrs Tracy Fox
- Gender: Coeducational
- Age: 11 to 16
- Enrolment: 1,358
- Website: http://www.waterheadacademy.co.uk/

Waterhead Academy was a coeducational secondary school with academy status located in Oldham, Greater Manchester, England. The academy was taken out of special measures in June 2016 and was one of the most improved academies in the country in 2016. The Academy was rated as good by Ofsted (leadership) and was sponsored by South Pennines Academies Trust.

The academy first opened in September 2010, following the formal closure of Counthill School in Moorside and Breeze Hill School in Oldham. The academy was initially located at the two campuses of the former schools, however it relocated to a new main campus in November 2012. The main campus was located on the site of the former Orb Mill. The academy also operated a sports campus which was located at the site of the former Counthill School.

== History ==
Waterhead Academy began with the merging of two Oldham secondary schools: the predominantly Asian Breeze Hill School in Oldham and the predominantly White British Counthill School in Moorside, using a strategy of 'forced integration' in an attempt to quell racial tension between Oldham children.

In September, Co-op Academies Trust took over the management of Waterhead Academy, which was renamed to Co-op Academy Strinesdale

== Notable alumni ==
- Cora Kirk, actress
