= Jamie Njoku-Goodwin =

British special adviser

Jamie Njoku-Goodwin OBE is a British music industry executive and former political adviser. He was Chief Executive of UK Music from 2020 to 2023, and served as Director of Strategy to Prime Minister Rishi Sunak from 2023 to 2024.

== Early life ==
Jamie Njoku-Goodwin was born in London and attended Ravenscroft School in Barnet. He received a degree in Music from the University of Nottingham, followed by a Masters in International Relations.

== Career ==
In 2016, Njoku-Goodwin worked for Theresa May in her campaign in the 2016 Conservative Party leadership election before going on to work for Lynton Crosby.

In 2018, Njoku-Goodwin was appointed as a special adviser at the Department for Digital, Culture, Media and Sport under Culture Secretary Matt Hancock. He moved with Hancock to the Department of Health and Social Care later that year. Njoku-Goodwin gave evidence at the UK COVID-19 Inquiry.

Njoku-Goodwin took over as CEO of UK Music in October 2020 and led the organisation during the rest of the pandemic. In 2023, he left the role to re-join government as director of strategy at No10 Downing Street under Prime Minister Rishi Sunak. He was part of the Conservative Party campaign in the 2024 United Kingdom general election. In the 2024 Prime Minister's Resignation Honours he received an OBE for political and public service.

Njoku-Goodwin currently sits on the boards of ABRSM, Britten Pears Arts, the London Philharmonic Orchestra and the Royal College of Music. He previously served as a member of National Council of Arts Council England, on the expert advisory panel for the Government’s National Plan for Music Education, on the expert advisory panel for UK City of Culture 2025, and on the Creative Industries Council.

== Personal life ==
Njoku-Goodwin is mixed race.
