= Parliamentary Under-Secretary of State for Food, Fisheries and Farming =

British government minister

United Kingdom Parliamentary Under-Secretary of State for Food, Fisheries and Farming
- Royal Arms of His Majesty's Government

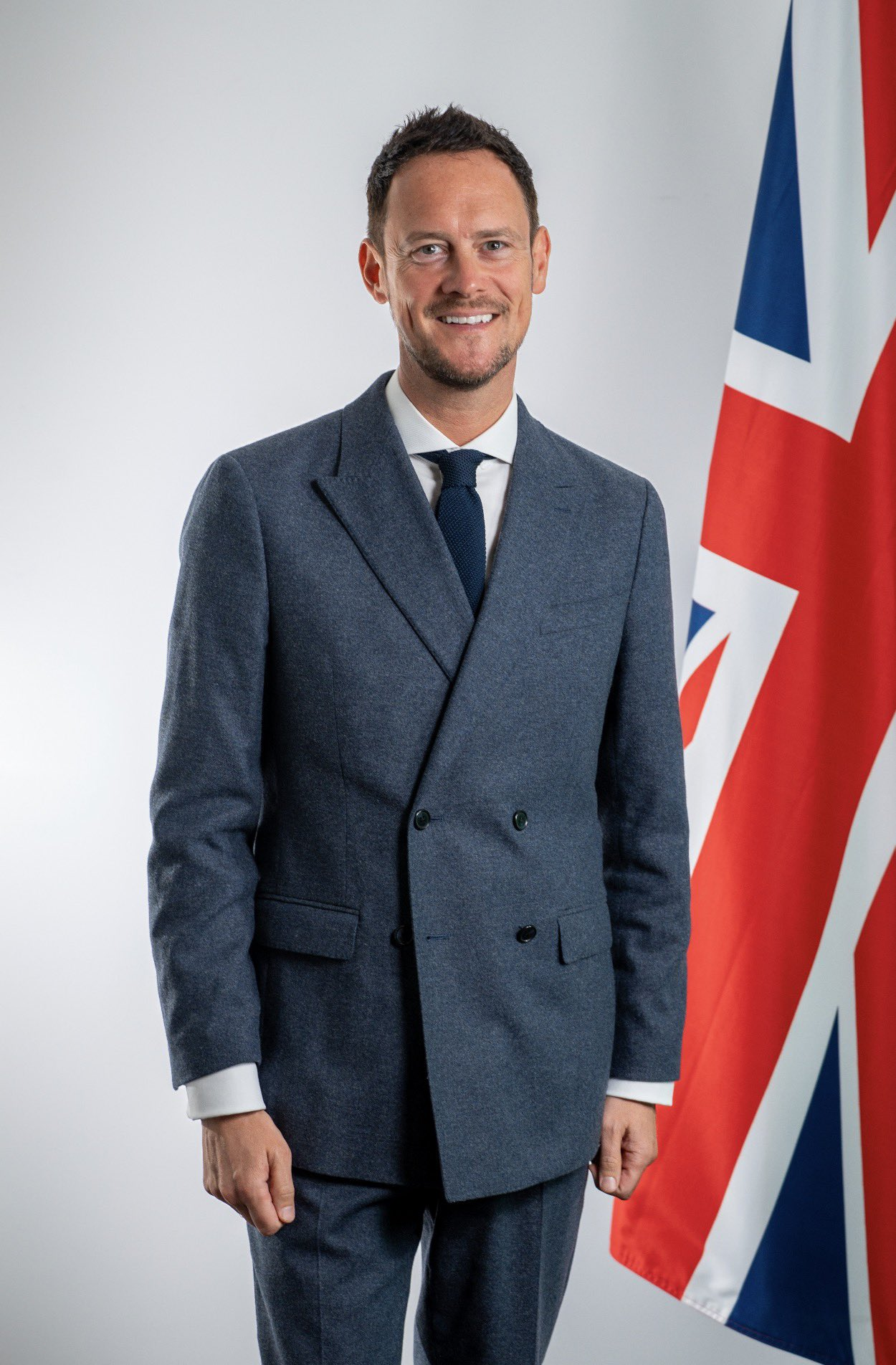
- Incumbent; Stephen Morgan since 12 June 2026
- Department for Environment, Food and Rural Affairs
- Style: Minister
- Nominator: Prime Minister of the United Kingdom
- Appointer: The King; on advice of the Prime Minister
- Term length: At His Majesty's pleasure
- Website: www.gov.uk/government/ministers/parliamentary-under-secretary-of-state--329

The Parliamentary Under-Secretary of State for Food, Fisheries and Farming is a mid-level position in the Department for Environment, Food and Rural Affairs in the British government. The incumbent Minister is Stephen Morgan.

== Responsibilities ==
Responsibilities include:

- Overall lead Minister for the agri-food chain, and lead Minister for the Union and Levelling Up relating to Defra issues
- Lead for Rural Payments Agency, Animal Health Development Board, Fera, Centre for Environment, Fisheries and Aquaculture, Marine Management Organisation and relationship with the Food Standards Agency
- Fisheries
- Farming
- Food
- Trade
- Pesticides

== List of ministers ==
Name	Portrait	Entered office	Left office	Political party	Prime Minister
Minister of State for Agriculture, Fisheries and Food
Anthony Stodart		7 April 1972	4 March 1974	Conservative	Edward Heath
Norman Buchan		8 March 1974	18 October 1974	Labour	Harold Wilson
Edward Stanley Bishop		18 October 1974	4 May 1979	Labour	James Callaghan
The 13th Earl Ferrers		7 May 1979	13 June 1983	Conservative	Margaret Thatcher
Alick Buchanan-Smith		7 May 1979	13 June 1983	Conservative	Margaret Thatcher
John MacGregor		13 June 1983	2 September 1985	Conservative	Margaret Thatcher
The 2nd Baron Belstead		13 June 1983	13 June 1987	Conservative	Margaret Thatcher
John Gummer		2 September 1985	26 July 1988	Conservative	Margaret Thatcher
The Baroness Trumpington		28 September 1989	14 April 1992	Conservative	John Major
David Curry		14 April 1992	27 May 1993	Conservative	John Major
Michael Jack		27 May 1993	5 July 1995	Conservative	John Major
Tony Baldry		5 July 1995	1 May 1997	Conservative	John Major
Jeff Rooker		6 May 1997	29 July 1999	Labour	Tony Blair
Joyce Quin		29 July 1999	7 June 2001	Labour	Tony Blair
Parliamentary Under-Secretary of State for Food, Farming and Sustainable Energy
The Lord Whitty		12 June 2001	10 May 2005	Labour	Tony Blair
The Lord Bach		10 May 2005	5 May 2006	Labour	Tony Blair
Minister of State for Sustainable Food, Farming and Animal Health
The Lord Rooker		6 May 2006	3 October 2008	Labour	Tony Blair; Gordon Brown
Minister of State for Farming and the Environment
Jane Kennedy		5 October 2008	8 June 2009	Labour	Gordon Brown
Minister of State for Food, Farming and the Environment
Jim Fitzpatrick		8 June 2009	11 May 2010	Labour	Gordon Brown
Minister of State for Agriculture and Food
Jim Paice		13 May 2010	4 September 2012	Conservative	David Cameron
David Heath		4 September 2012	7 October 2013	Liberal Democrats	David Cameron
Parliamentary Under-Secretary of State for Agriculture, Fisheries and Food
George Eustice		8 October 2013	8 May 2015	Conservative	David Cameron
Minister of State for Agriculture, Fisheries and Food
George Eustice		8 May 2015	28 February 2019	Conservative	David Cameron; Theresa May
Minister of State for Agriculture, Fisheries and Food
Robert Goodwill		5 March 2019	25 July 2019	Conservative	Theresa May
George Eustice		25 July 2019	13 February 2020	Conservative	Boris Johnson
Parliamentary Under-Secretary for Agriculture, Fisheries and Food
Victoria Prentis		14 February 2020	16 September 2021	Conservative	Boris Johnson
Minister of State for Agriculture, Fisheries and Food
Victoria Prentis		16 September 2021	6 September 2022	Conservative	Boris Johnson
Minister of State for Food
Mark Spencer		7 September 2022	25 October 2022	Conservative	Liz Truss
Minister of State for Food, Farming and Fisheries
Mark Spencer		25 October 2022	5 July 2024	Conservative	Rishi Sunak
Minister of State for Food Security and Rural Affairs
Daniel Zeichner		5 July 2024	6 September 2025	Labour	Keir Starmer
Angela Eagle		6 September 2025	12 June 2026	Labour	Keir Starmer
Stephen Morgan		12 June 2026	22 July 2026	Labour	Keir Starmer
Parliamentary Under-Secretary of State for Food, Fisheries and Farming
Stephen Morgan		22 July 2026	Incumbent	Labour	Andy Burnham
