= George Eustice =

British Conservative politician (born 1971)

The Right Honourable George Eustice
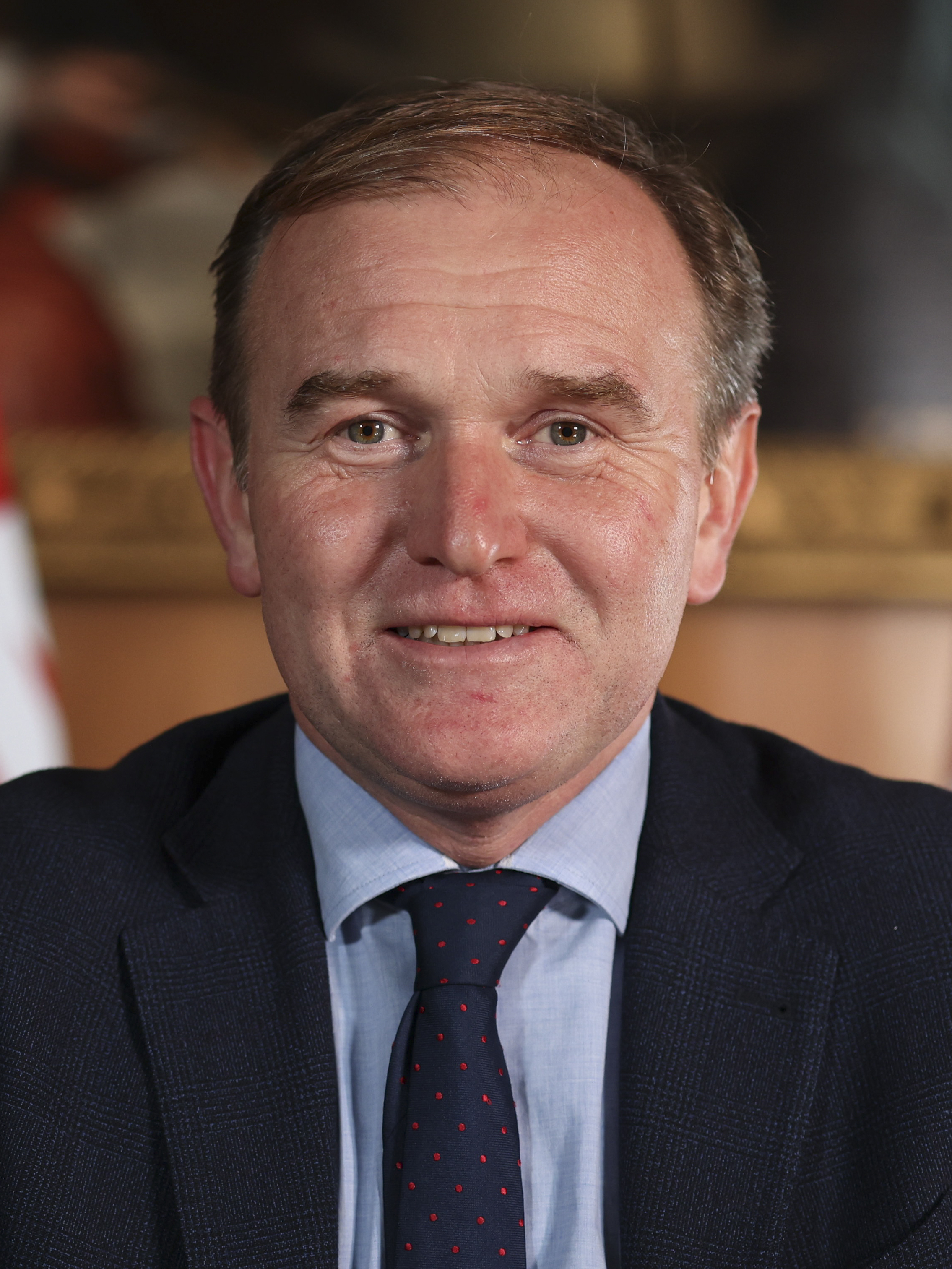
- Official portrait, 2021

Secretary of State for Environment, Food and Rural Affairs
- In office 13 February 2020 – 6 September 2022
- Prime Minister: Boris Johnson
- Preceded by: Theresa Villiers
- Succeeded by: Ranil Jayawardena

Minister of State for Agriculture, Fisheries and Food (Note: Parliamentary Under-Secretary of State (2013–15))
- In office 25 July 2019 – 13 February 2020
- Prime Minister: Boris Johnson
- Preceded by: Robert Goodwill
- Succeeded by: Victoria Prentis
- In office 8 October 2013 – 28 February 2019
- Prime Minister: David Cameron; Theresa May
- Preceded by: David Heath
- Succeeded by: Robert Goodwill

Member of Parliament for Camborne and Redruth
- In office 6 May 2010 – 30 May 2024
- Preceded by: Constituency established
- Succeeded by: Perran Moon

Personal details
- Born: 28 September 1971 (age 54) Penzance, Cornwall, England
- Party: Conservative
- Other political affiliations: UK Independence Party (former)
- Spouse: Katy Eustice
- Website: georgeeustice.org.uk

Charles George Eustice (born 28 September 1971) is a British politician and former public relations executive who held office as Secretary of State for Environment, Food and Rural Affairs between 2020 and 2022. A former UKIP member, he later joined the Conservative Party, where he served as the Member of Parliament (MP) for Camborne and Redruth from 2010 to 2024.

In the 1999 European Parliament elections, Eustice stood unsuccessfully as a UK Independence Party (UKIP) candidate in South West England. He later joined the Conservative Party and was the Director of Communications at CCHQ; and from 2005 to 2008, he served as David Cameron's Press Secretary during his tenure as Leader of the Opposition. In 2009, Eustice joined Portland Communications, a public relations company.

Eustice was elected to the House of Commons in 2010. In October 2013, as part of Prime Minister Cameron's ministerial reshuffle, Eustice was appointed Parliamentary Under-Secretary of State for Agriculture, Fisheries and Food. On 11 May 2015 he was promoted to Minister of State within the same department. He was retained by Prime Minister Theresa May; however, he resigned from this position on 28 February 2019. Eustice was reappointed to his previous role by Prime Minister Boris Johnson on 25 July 2019. On 13 February 2020 he joined the Cabinet replacing Theresa Villiers as Secretary of State for Environment, Food and Rural Affairs, a position he held until Johnson's successor Liz Truss dismissed him from it upon taking office in September 2022. He announced in January 2023 that he would not stand for reelection at the 2024 United Kingdom general election.

== Early life and career ==
Eustice was born on 28 September 1971 into a farming family in Penzance. His parents were Adele and Paul Eustice. He grew up at Trevaskis Fruit Farm, near Hayle. He was privately educated at Truro Cathedral School and then Truro School, followed by studies at the state-sector Cornwall College at Pool. He was a member of Cornwall Athletic Club based at Carn Brea, Camborne and ran for Cornwall's cross country team. After finishing his education, he worked for nine years in his family business, a fruit farm near the Cornish village of Connor Downs. He attended Writtle College for three years.

== Early political career ==
At the 1999 European Parliament Elections Eustice stood unsuccessfully as a candidate for UKIP in South West England.

In 2000, Eustice was appointed as Campaign Director for "No", the campaign group to ensure that the UK did not adopt the Euro as the national currency.

Eustice became Head of Press under Conservative Party leader Michael Howard during the 2005 general election. Following the election, he was part of David Cameron's Leadership campaign team and, between 2005 and 2008, served as David Cameron's Press Secretary during his tenure as Leader of the Opposition. On leaving Cameron's office, George Eustice worked for Portland Communications, a public relations company.

On 6 December 2008, Eustice was selected as the official Conservative Party candidate for the Camborne & Redruth Constituency.

== Parliamentary career ==
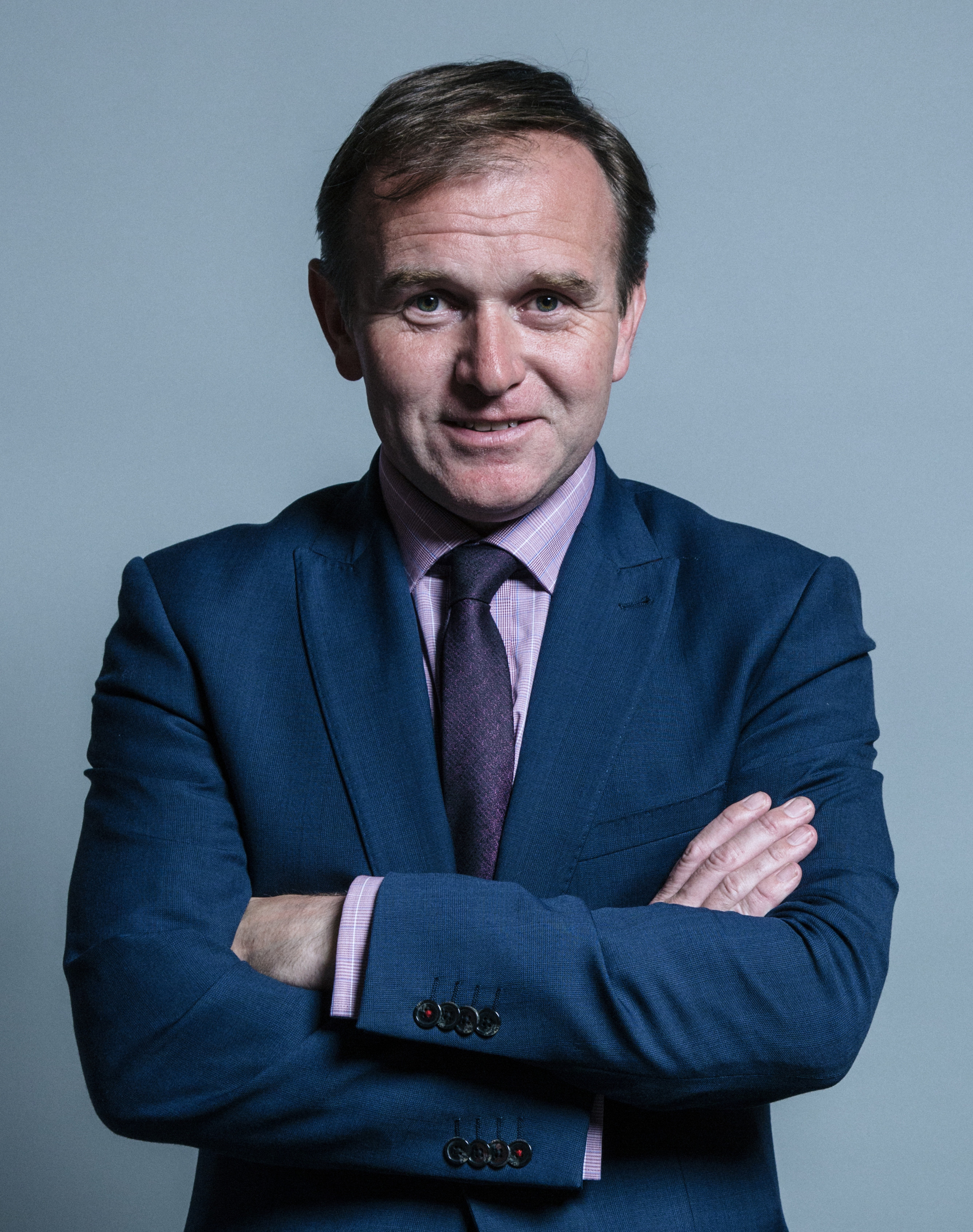
Eustice's official parliamentary portrait from 2017

Eustice was elected as Member of Parliament for Camborne & Redruth on Thursday 6 May 2010 with a majority of 66 votes over the Liberal Democrat incumbent Julia Goldsworthy. The result was only confirmed after a recount. He had the second smallest majority of any Conservative elected at the 2010 election, with only Dan Byles 54 vote majority in North Warwickshire being lower, and the fourth smallest majority of any MP. He made his maiden speech in the House of Commons on 24 June 2010: "It is a special honour for me to represent my home town. I was brought up between Camborne and Hayle, in Cornwall, and my family have lived and worked in the area for more than 400 years. When one has such deep roots in a constituency, one feels a special responsibility for its long-term future." Later in the same speech he said "My No. 1 priority for the area will be economic regeneration."

Eustice was asked to take a leading role in the 2011 "No to AV Referendum" campaign, reportedly as a result of his work for Business for Sterling and the "No" Group, which campaigned to keep the pound and against the adoption of the Euro as currency in the UK.

In September 2011, he argued that Cornwall's heritage should be administered by a Cornish organisation rather than English Heritage.

In September 2011, Eustice, with two other Conservative MPs Andrea Leadsom and Chris Heaton-Harris launched the Fresh Start Group to examine the options for a new UK-EU relationship. He wrote an article in The Guardian on 10 June 2012, which argued for the UK to remain within the EU, but to seek reform from within. On 10 July 2012 the Fresh Start Group released a research paper, which according to The Financial Times, called for "reducing the overall size of the EU budget, overhauling the Common Agricultural Policy to which the UK contributes about £1bn a year and repatriating structural funds."

On 17 May 2012, Eustice was elected to the Executive Committee of the 1922 Committee as part of the "301 Group" of newer MPs.

Eustice has supported statutory underpinning of independent press regulation which arose from the Leveson proposals. On 21 June 2012, he made a submission to the Leveson Inquiry and wrote an article in The Guardian urging both journalists and politicians to back a royal charter. Reacting to the letter, Conservative writer Tim Montgomerie argued that greater press regulation was now more likely.

Eustice was a member of the Environment, Food and Rural Affairs Select Committee from 12 July 2010 until November 2013 and of the Privacy and Injunctions (Joint Committee) between July 2011 and March 2012.

In April 2013, Downing Street announced Eustice's appointment to the "Number 10 Policy Board", to advise David Cameron on Energy and Environment issues. Eustice was appointed to work on Conservative rather than Coalition policies, with backbenchers including Jo Johnson, Jesse Norman, and Peter Lilley.

He was criticised by The Daily Telegraph in November 2012 for signing a letter calling for tougher regulation of the press on the grounds that he had previously been the subject of negative media coverage. The newspaper reported that he had previously been nicknamed "Useless" by some sections of the press and had a difficult relationship with the media because of its treatment of David Cameron when they were working closely together. Eustice responded that the existing system was flawed and that "it would be better by far to have credible and independent regulation much earlier in the process."

On 7 October 2013, Eustice was appointed Parliamentary Under Secretary of State in the Department for Environment, Food and Rural Affairs, with responsibility for farming and food, marine and fisheries, and animal health. On 11 May 2015 he was promoted to Minister of State for Agriculture, Fisheries and Food.

In May 2016, it was reported that Eustice was one of a number of Conservative MPs being investigated by police in the United Kingdom general election, 2015 party spending investigation, for allegedly spending more than the legal limit on constituency election campaign expenses. In May 2017, the Crown Prosecution Service said that while there was evidence of inaccurate spending returns, it did not "meet the test" for further action.

In August 2016, Eustice was one of two Conservative environment ministers who were accused by environmental campaigners of having a conflict of interest over receiving subsidies on their family businesses whilst being involved in developing the plans for the replacement system to the EU farming support.

He was re-elected at the 2015 general election and 2017 general election. He supported Leave in the 2016 EU membership referendum.

On 28 February 2019, Eustice resigned from his position as Minister of State for Agriculture, Fisheries and Food, in protest at Prime Minister Theresa May's promise to allow MPs a vote on delaying Brexit if her deal fails to get through. Eustice stated "it would be dangerous to go to the EU cap in hand at the 11th hour and beg for an extension".

=== Secretary of State for Environment, Food and Rural Affairs ===
On 13 February 2020, Eustice was appointed as the new Secretary of State for Environment, Food and Rural Affairs, replacing Theresa Villiers. Eustice called the post his "dream job".

Later in February 2020, in an interview on Sky News, Eustice refused to guarantee that the UK government would ban chlorinated chicken outright as part of a UK–US trade deal. He described chlorine washes on chicken as "a very outdated technology" and said the UK government was committed to high standards for food safety and for animal welfare, saying there were "no plans" to change food standards laws.

Eustice was criticised for an alleged closeness to the farming industry and for his enabling of badger culling. Prime Minister Boris Johnson signalled an end to badger culling after Eustice had overseen an expansion in licenses for it in 2020.

In late 2020, Eustice repeatedly expressed support for the Internal Market Bill, despite the latter representing a breach of formal commitments made by the Conservative government of which he is a part, and also a breach of international law. He also said that a Scotch egg was a substantial meal in law, so long as there is table service.

In December 2020, during a Sky News interview, Eustice was shown footage of, and asked for his views about, Millwall F.C. supporters booing players taking a knee. Those supporters' behaviour had already been condemned as racist by the English Football League and the Football Association. Eustice declined to condemn the supporters' behaviour or to recognise it as racist, stating that he had not seen the incident and that "the issue of race and racial discrimination is something that we all take very seriously".

In January 2021, Eustice broke his government's pledge to retain a ban on the use of neonicotinoid pesticides, which have been implicated in pollinator decline. In May, Eustice announced a radical new animal welfare strategy to be introduced as the Kept Animals Bill, Animal Welfare (Sentience) Bill and Animals Abroad Bill. These bills would make the microchipping of cats compulsory, recognise the sentience of vertebrate animals and ban live animal exports for fattening and slaughter. He also announced the government would look at banning practices such as importing foie gras, inhumane poultry caging and inhumane penning of pregnant and suckling pigs.

Eustice was dismissed by incoming Prime Minister Liz Truss on 6 September 2022.

== Post-parliamentary career ==
In January 2023, Eustice stated he would not stand at the 2024 general election, saying he wanted "the opportunity to do a final career outside politics". This came after polls suggested the Conservatives would lose his seat to Labour with a 17.3% drop in vote share.

In August 2023, the Advisory Committee on Business Appointments (ACOBA) cleared Eustice to set up a consultancy firm, but said that any clients would have to be approved by ACOBA up until September 2024 to avoid giving them undue access to government departments. According to the ACOBA report, Eustice's consultancy would work for companies in the agri-tech, agri-food, waste management and water sectors. The St Ives Times & Echo reported in November 2023 that the consultancy, called Penbroath Ltd, had started work in September, receiving a £2,000 fee from a waste management company.

== Constituency campaigns ==
In August 2010, Eustice welcomed the Government's decision to invest £5 million into the regeneration of Hayle Harbour after two months of discussions. According to the West Briton newspaper, Eustice had lobbied ministers over the issue and further argued local social enterprises and community trusts should be actively involved in regeneration plans.

Eustice pledged in his election campaign to work to reduce the burden of water charges on Cornish homes. At a meeting of the Environmental, Farming and Rural Affairs Select Committee in October 2010 he raised the issue of higher water rates paid by South West England consumers and challenged Regina Finn, chief executive of Ofwat to implement the recommendations of the Walker Review which could lead to a decrease in water rates for South West consumers. In June 2013, Eustice welcomed the third annual taxpayer-funded subsidy of £50 for all South West Water customers which the Chancellor, George Osborne, announced in the Comprehensive Spending Review on 26 June. In November 2013, he welcomed South West Water's price freeze until 2015.

In March 2013, Eustice called for the Cornwall Centre, the new facility to house the county's store of historic manuscripts and Cornish materials, to be based in Redruth. Eustice based his call for the location to be Redruth because of the strong mining tradition in the town, which led to widespread migration across the world. The decision to base the facility in Redruth was announced in September 2013, which Eustice welcomed.

Before his election, Eustice campaigned for government funding to build a £27m east–west link road at Tuckingmill, linking Camborne, Pool and Redruth. The road would run from Wilson Way to Dolcoath Road. Cornwall Council also supported the bid, claiming the new road would provide access to "proposed development areas" and remove traffic from the A3047 and the East Hill junction, reduce congestion, noise and improve air quality, "whilst allowing regeneration projects in the area to proceed over the coming years, supporting economic growth". The project received Department for Transport approval on 26 November 2012 and on 16 May 2013, Patrick McLoughlin the Secretary of State for Transport cut the first turf to formally mark the start of work on the £27m road. The road, which received substantial funding from the European Regional Development Fund, was completed in November 2015.

Eustice led Conservative Party opposition to the Conservative Government's plans to impose VAT on hot food, which was also known as the "pasty tax" which eventually led to what opponents claimed was a "U-turn" in Government policy. He welcomed the reverse in policy.

== Personal life ==
Eustice married Katy Taylor-Richards in May 2013; their ceremony took place in the Chapel of St Mary Undercroft at the Palace of Westminster.

== Notes ==
Parliament of the United Kingdom
New constituency	Member of Parliament for Camborne and Redruth; 2010–2024	Succeeded by Perran Moon
Political offices
Preceded by David Heath	Parliamentary Under-Secretary of State for Agriculture, Fisheries and Food; 2013–2015	Succeeded by Himself as Minister of State for Agriculture, Fisheries and Food
Preceded by Himself as Parliamentary Under-Secretary of State for Agriculture, Fisheries and Food	Minister of State for Agriculture, Fisheries and Food; 2015–2019	Succeeded by Robert Goodwill
Preceded by Robert Goodwill	Minister of State for Agriculture, Fisheries and Food; 2019–2020	Succeeded by Victoria Prentis as Parliamentary Under-Secretary of State for Farming, Fisheries and Food
Preceded by Theresa Villiers	Secretary of State for Environment, Food and Rural Affairs; 2020–2022	Succeeded by Ranil Jayawardena
