= Counthill School =

Location
- Counthill Road; Oldham, Greater Manchester, OL4 2PY; England; 53.5565°N 2.0771°W

Information
- Former name: Counthill Grammar School
- Type: Community school
- Motto: Animo Atque Fide
- Established: c. 1951
- Closed: 2010 (now Waterhead Academy)
- Local authority: Oldham
- Department for Education URN: 105728 Tables
- Ofsted: Reports
- Gender: Mixed
- Age: 11 to 16
- Houses: Globe, Granville, Cairo and Albany (local mills)

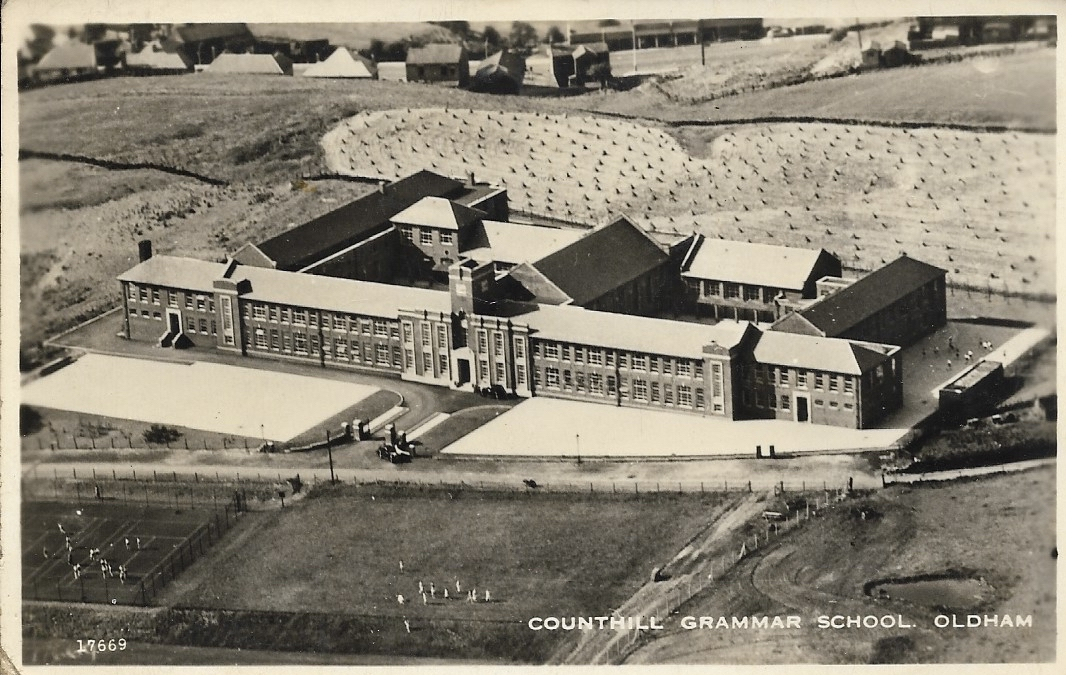
Counthill School, newly built, around 1953

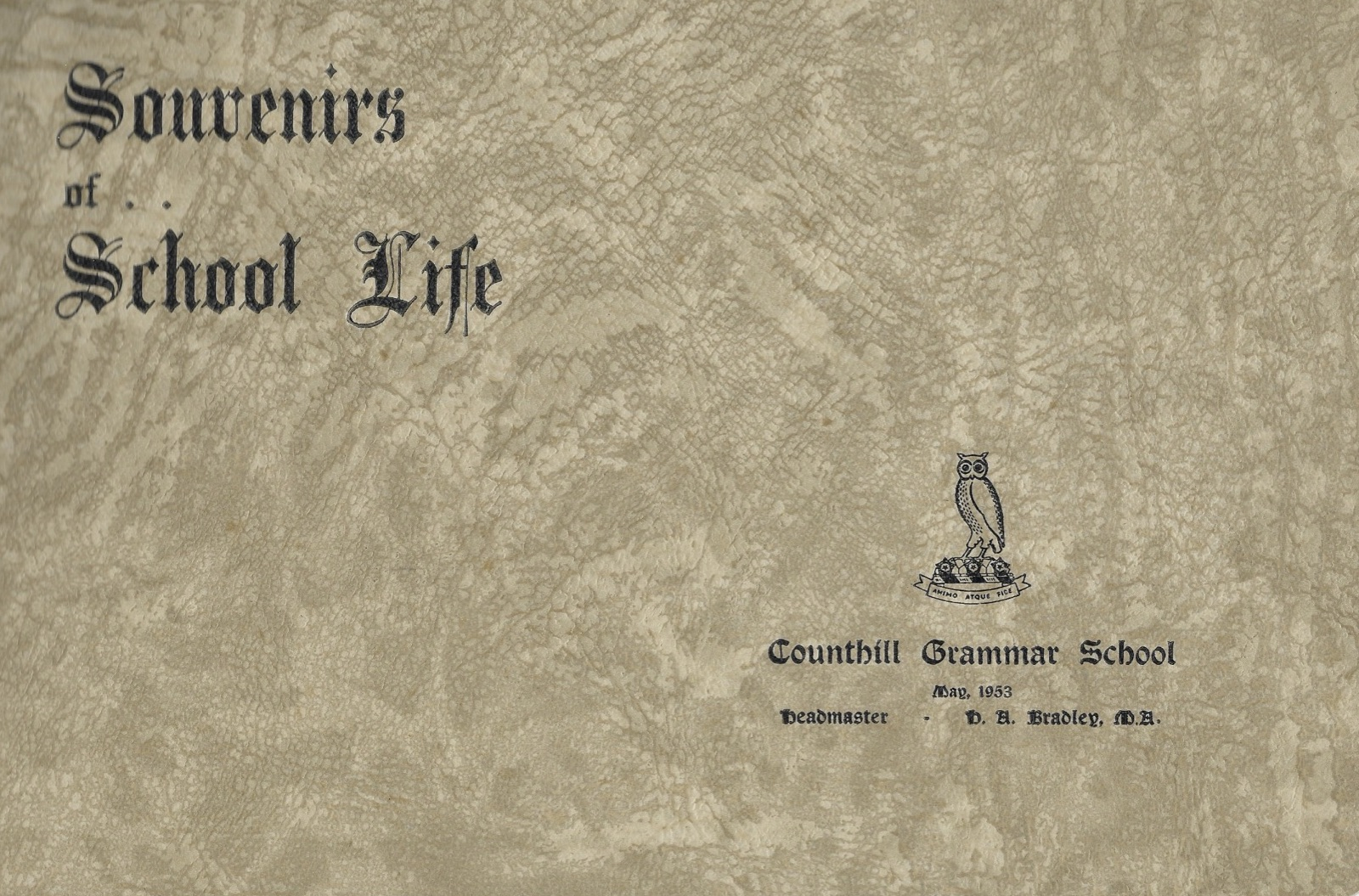
Cover of class photo showing the original school badge

Counthill School formerly a high-achieving Grammar School, was a mixed gender secondary school for 11- to 16-year-olds in the Moorside area of Oldham in Greater Manchester, England. The school had approximately 900 pupils on roll and its motto was Animo Atque Fide. Although sometimes mistakenly thought to be the highest secondary school above sea level in the country, the site sits between 280 and 285 metres, which is lower than others such as Buxton Community School at 320 metres.

== History ==
Counthill Grammar School was planned in the 1930s but construction was delayed by World War II and it opened in September 1951. In 1966 it accepted its first comprehensive school intake. Problems with the school were later identified and in November 2004 it was placed in special measures. A year later it was rated as satisfactory, but Oldham Borough Council decided to reshape secondary schooling under the UK government's Building Schools for the Future project. Counthill, along with four other failing schools at the time (Breeze Hill, Kaskenmoor, Grange, South Chadderton) were earmarked for closure to form two new Academies. It closed at the end of July 2010 as part of the New Oldham Academies Project, merging with Breezehill School to form Waterhead Academy. Initially the school site was used as the Moorside campus of the new academy; however, after Waterhead relocated its main campus to a third site in November 2012, the old Counthill site is now the sports campus of the academy.

== Teaching staff ==
David J. Clifford resigned as head teacher in March 2005 after Ofsted criticised him as lacking a clear strategic vision for improving his pupils' quality of education.

Margaret Ryan, who got the school out of special measures, after replacing Clifford, retired from her post on 12 September 2008.

David Lack was appointed headteacher in 2008 and has a record for transforming struggling school. He left when the school merged.

== Academics ==
Although the school did require Special Measures in 2004 on 23 November 2006 the special measures tag was removed. GCSE exam results improved from 27% in 2004 to 51% passes at A-C in 2007.

== Houses ==
Since it was opened, the school has always had four houses with a head of house and house girl and house boy representing their houses.

For the first two decades the houses were Joslin House, Handley House, Lees House and Viner House.

When the two house blocks of two storeys were constructed at the rear of the school in the early 1970's the houses were renamed after prominent philanthropist lords and given identifying colours.

Carnegie (Blue) was housed on the top floor of the block nearest the arts and crafts building.
Shaftesbury (Yellow) was housed on the bottom floor of the block nearest the arts and crafts building.
Nobel (Red) was housed on the top floor of the block nearest the science buildings.
Nuffield (Green) was housed on the bottom floor of the block nearest the science buildings.

In the early 2000's the house names were considered elitist and renamed to reflect the names of local mills although Globe was never a mill in Oldham.

In the final years before closure and demolition, the houses were Globe, Granville (Prince Charlie St, Derker), Cairo (Greenacres Road, Waterhead) and Albany (Vulcan St, Derker)

== Notable alumni ==
- Ian Kershaw, historian
- Anne Kirkbride, actor in Coronation Street (Deirdre Barlow)
- Paul Sculthorpe, rugby league player
