= UK Music =

Industry body

- Formation: 26 September 2008
- Legal status: Association
- Purpose: Industry representation
- Headquarters: Work.Life, 33 Foley Street, London W1W 7TL
- Region served: United Kingdom
- Chair: Catriona Laing
- CEO: Tom Kiehl
- Staff: 10
- Website: ukmusic.org

UK Music is a British umbrella organisation which represents the collective interests of the production side of UK's commercial music industry. It includes organisations such as BPI and PRS.

== History ==
Launched on 26 September 2008, Feargal Sharkey, former member of The Undertones, became chief executive officer (CEO) and Andy Heath, former chairman of British Music Rights, became chairman. Sharkey stated that UK Music would mark 'a bold new chapter for the UK's commercial music industry', promising to streamline industry representation and launch a manifesto calling for government support on 'a range of issues'.

Sharkey left the organisation in November 2011, with Jo Dipple confirmed on 27 January 2012 as the next CEO.

In January 2017, it was announced that Dipple would stand down as its CEO in June 2017. In April 2017, former Labour Party MP and Shadow Cabinet member Michael Dugher was announced as Dipple's replacement. Dugher took over as CEO of UK Music in May 2017.

In December 2019 Michael Dugher announced he would be stepping down as CEO. Deputy CEO Tom Kiehl took over as acting CEO in February 2020. Former Labour Party Deputy Leader Tom Watson took over as chair, replacing Andy Heath, in April 2020. He stood down in November 2025. Catriona Laing was announced as his replacement, with her term starting 'mid-2026'.

Jamie Njoku-Goodwin took over as CEO of UK Music in October 2020. Following nine months acting as Interim CEO, Tom Kiehl was formally appointed CEO in June 2024.

The organisation releases an annual report, titled 'Music By Numbers', which encompasses music sales, licensing, musicians' income, merchandise and touring sales, amongst other topics. In 2020, the report found that over a third of UK Music members had lost their jobs due to the knock-on effects of the Covid-19 pandemic, with Njoku-Goodwin calling the membership 'demoralised and demotivated' in 2022. The 2024 annual report found that the music industry had contributed £8 billion to the UK economy that year, with Kiehl calling on the government to further regulate AI and to make it easier for UK artists to tour in the EU, noting that the 'status quo' was 'tilted against music's interests'. UK Music outlined actions it would like to see the UK government take in relation to AI, including legal requirements for clear labelling of AI-generated music.

== Sounds Rights ==
In December 2008, UK Music launched Sounds Rights, a free online resource for teachers and schools to support music study in schools.
