= Oldham Sixth Form College =

Location
- Union Street West; Oldham, Greater Manchester, OL8 1XU; England; 53.538654°N 2.118651°W

Information
- Type: Sixth form college
- Established: 1992
- Local authority: Oldham
- Department for Education URN: 145002 Tables
- Ofsted: Reports
- Principal: Suzannah Reeves
- Gender: Mixed
- Age: 16 to 19
- Enrolment: 2,200 (approx.)
- Telephone: 0161 287 8000
- Website: http://www.osfc.ac.uk

Oldham Sixth Form College is a government-funded college of further education in Oldham, Greater Manchester, England. Opened in 1992 as a specialist centre for advanced-level study, the Principal of the college is Suzannah Reeves.

Despite being a relatively new college, the college has managed to gain an excellent reputation; with good reports coming from both OFSTED and the local paper.

== Courses ==
The college offers over 100 courses that include academic, vocational and even GCSE courses.

Students may take between two and four A level subjects to study; but some students have been known to take five subjects due to various reasons.

Students who take three subjects study in the college for around 18 hours each week whereas students who take four subjects study in the college for around 22.5 hours.

Students at the college are also able to take enrichment courses which are held once a week on a Wednesday afternoon. These enrichment courses can be vocational or academic. Some enrichment courses result in a qualification with some resulting in complete AS/A level qualifications.

== Acceptance and enrolment ==
The college takes on nearly 1200 students each year, the majority of which have just completed compulsory secondary education.

To gain admission to the college, students must gain five GCSE results at grades C and above including English Language and Mathematics. The college works off a point system in which:

- A*, A, B = 6
- C = 5
- D = 4
- E = 3
- F = 2
- G = 1

To study four advanced-level subjects at the college students must gain 42 points or more, To study three advanced-level subjects students must gain between 38 and 41 points. To study 2 advanced-level subjects students must gain between 33 and 37 points.

== Regional Science Centre Oldham ==
The college's science subjects were moved from the main buildings into a new science centre on King Street in 2011. After several months of internal building work, the formerly vacant office block was transformed into the Regional Science Centre, which not only houses science lessons for OSFC but is also visited by pupils from local primary schools. It also hosts lectures for students held by science professors and experts from different fields. The centre opened to students in Spring 2011 and the official opening ceremony was held on 19 October 2011 by former principal Nick Brown OBE.

== 20th anniversary ==
The college celebrated its 20th anniversary in September 2012. The event was accompanied by a weekly Oldham Evening Chronicle feature which counted down the 20 weeks leading to the event with archive stories, photographs and articles on its achievements and history.

== Other information ==
- The college was awarded the learning and skills Beacon status in 2005 and most recently in an Ofsted report published in June 2008, the college achieved the highest grades in all areas.

== See also ==
- The Oldham College
- University Centre Oldham
