= David Bennett (consultant) =

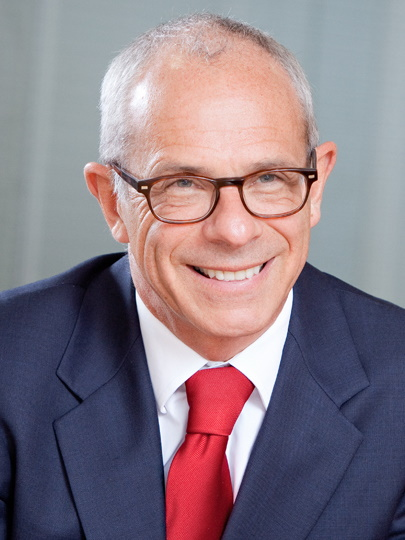
- Government portrait, 2013

NHS Chief Executive of Monitor

Head of the Policy Directorate in Number 10 Downing Street
- In office June 2005 – July 2011

Monitor's Interim Chief Executive
- In office March 2010 – Present

NHS Chief Executive and Chair
- In office February 2011 – Present

Personal details
- Born: 3 August 1955 (age 70)
- Occupation: Consultant
- Salary: £282,500 (April 2011)

David William Bennett (born 3 August 1955) is a consultant, public policy analyst, and the former Chief Executive of Monitor, the regulator of the National Health Service (NHS) in England. He was appointed Chief Executive and Chair in February 2011. He had been Monitor's Interim Chief Executive since March 2010.

He was previously Head of the Policy Directorate in Number 10 Downing Street, serving between June 2005 and July 2007, when he was replaced after Gordon Brown succeeded Tony Blair as Prime Minister. Bennett was previously at the management consultancy firm, McKinsey & Company, in a 20-year career.

In April 2011 he was named as the highest paid employee (£282,500) in the English NHS. His salary (£230,000) was the highest in the NHS in 2013.

He was said by the Health Service Journal to be the eighth most powerful person in the English NHS in December 2013. As of 2015, Bennett was paid a salary of between £230,000 and £234,999 by Monitor, making him one of the 328 most highly paid people in the British public sector at that time.

In July 2014, Bennett’s roles at Monitor were criticised by the Public Accounts Committee of the House of Commons (PAC), which noted: “It is wholly inappropriate that the same person acted as both Chair and Chief Executive of Monitor between March 2011 and January 2014. This was contrary to corporate governance good practice and Monitor's own guidance to NHS foundation trusts”.

The chief executive posts at Monitor and the NHS Trust Development Authority were merged into NHS Improvement in 2016, and Bennett stepped down. He subsequently joined the Serco-led pathology outsourcing company Viapath as chairman in February 2016.
