= Number 10 Policy Unit =

Body advising the British prime minister

- Royal Arms as used by His Majesty's Government

Policy Unit overview
- Formed: 1974
- Policy Unit executive: Graeme Cooke, Director
- Parent department: Office of the Prime Minister
- Website: number10.gov.uk

The Number 10 Policy Unit is a body of policymakers based in 10 Downing Street, providing policy advice directly to the British Prime Minister. Originally set up to support Harold Wilson in 1974, it has gone through a series of guises to suit the needs of successive prime ministers, staffed variously by political advisers, civil servants and more recently a combination of both.

The current Director of the Number 10 Policy Unit is Graeme Cooke.

== After 2010 ==
The Coalition Government of May 2010 quickly disbanded two major parts of central infrastructure built by Tony Blair – the Prime Minister's Delivery Unit (PMDU) and the Prime Minister's Strategy Unit (PMSU) – as part of the Prime Minister's agenda to reduce the number of special advisers and end the micromanagement of Whitehall. In their place, a strengthened Policy and Implementation Unit was launched in early 2011 by the Cabinet Secretary, staffed wholly by civil servants and reporting jointly to the Prime Minister and Deputy Prime Minister under joint heads Paul Kirby (Policy) and Kris Murrin (Implementation).

Members of the Policy Unit in 2010 were Gavin Lockhart-Mirams (Home Affairs), Sean Worth (Health and Adult Social Care), Chris Brown (Education), Richard Freer (Defence), Tim Luke (Business and Enterprise), Michael Lynas (Big Society) and Ben Moxham (Energy and Environment). The Unit was supported by the Research and Analytics Unit.

== Since 2019 ==
Munira Mirza was appointed director of the Policy Unit when Boris Johnson became prime minister. She had previously been Deputy Mayor of London with responsibility for Education and Culture under Johnson during his time as Mayor of London. Mirza resigned on 4 February 2022 after Johnson failed to apologise for making misleading remarks that implied that Keir Starmer failed to prosecute Jimmy Savile while the latter was Director of Public Prosecutions.

Andrew Griffith MP was appointed to replace Mirza as the director of the Policy Unit until 8 July 2022. As a sitting MP, he was also appointed as Parliamentary Secretary (Minister for Policy and Head of the Prime Minister's Policy Unit). The role was left vacant from 8 July 2022, as Johnson announced his resignation as party leader, with a view to remaining as a caretaker prime minister until his successor had been chosen.

The vacant post was filled by Jamie Hope on 6 September 2022 as part of the short-lived Truss ministry.

When Rishi Sunak became prime minister in October 2022, Eleanor Shawcross, the daughter of the Commissioner for Public Appointments, William Shawcross and grand-daughter of the barrister Hartley Shawcross, became director of the Policy Unit. She had previously donated £20,000 to his leadership campaign, having advised him while he was Chancellor of the Exchequer. Shawcross had previously spent 6 years as deputy chief of staff to George Osborne during his time as Chancellor, and chief of staff at the Department for Work and Pensions where she was later made a non-executive director.

== List of Directors of the Policy Unit ==
| # | Policy Director | Years | Peerage | Prime Minister |
|---|---|---|---|---|
| 1 | Bernard Donoughue | 1974–1976 | Baron Donoughue | Harold Wilson |
| 1 | Bernard Donoughue | 1976–1979 | Baron Donoughue | James Callaghan |
| 2 | John Hoskyns | 1979–1982 | | Margaret Thatcher |
| 3 | Ferdinand Mount | 1982–1983 | | Margaret Thatcher |
| 4 | John Redwood | 1983–1985 | Baron Redwood | Margaret Thatcher |
| 5 | Brian Griffiths | 1985–1990 | Baron Griffiths of Fforestfach | Margaret Thatcher |
| 6 | Sarah Hogg | 1990–1995 | Baroness Hogg | John Major |
| 7 | Norman Blackwell | 1995–1997 | Baron Blackwell | John Major |
| 8 | David Miliband | 1997–2001 | | Tony Blair |
| 9 | Andrew Adonis | 2001–2003 | Baron Adonis | Tony Blair |
| 10 | Geoff Mulgan | 2003–2004 | | Tony Blair |
| 11 | Matthew Taylor | 2005–2005 | | Tony Blair |
| 12 | David Bennett | 2005–2007 | | Tony Blair |
| 13 | Dan Corry | 2007–2008 | | Gordon Brown |
| 14 | Nick Pearce | 2008–2010 | | Gordon Brown |
| 15 | James O'Shaughnessy, Baron O'Shaughnessy | 2010–2011 | Baron O'Shaughnessy | David Cameron |
| 16 | Paul Kirby | 2011–2013 | | David Cameron |
| 17 | Jo Johnson MP | 2013–2015 | Baron Johnson of Marylebone | David Cameron |
| 18 | Camilla Cavendish | 2015–2016 | Baroness Cavendish of Little Venice | David Cameron |
| 19 | John Godfrey | 2016–2017 | | Theresa May |
| 20 | James Marshall | 2017–2019 | | Theresa May |
| 21 | Munira Mirza | 2019–2022 | | Boris Johnson |
| 22 | Andrew Griffith MP | 2022 | | Boris Johnson |
| 23 | Jamie Hope | 2022 | | Liz Truss |
| 24 | Eleanor Shawcross | 2022–2024 | Baroness Shawcross-Wolfson | Rishi Sunak |
| 25 | Stuart Ingham | 2024–2025 | | Keir Starmer |
| 26 | Harvey Redgrave | 2025–2026 | | Keir Starmer |
| 27 | Graeme Cooke | 2026–present | | Andy Burnham |

== See also ==
- Central Policy Review Staff
- Prime Minister's Office
