= Eleanor Shawcross, Baroness Shawcross-Wolfson =

British political advisor (born 1983)

The Right Honourable The Baroness Shawcross–Wolfson OBE
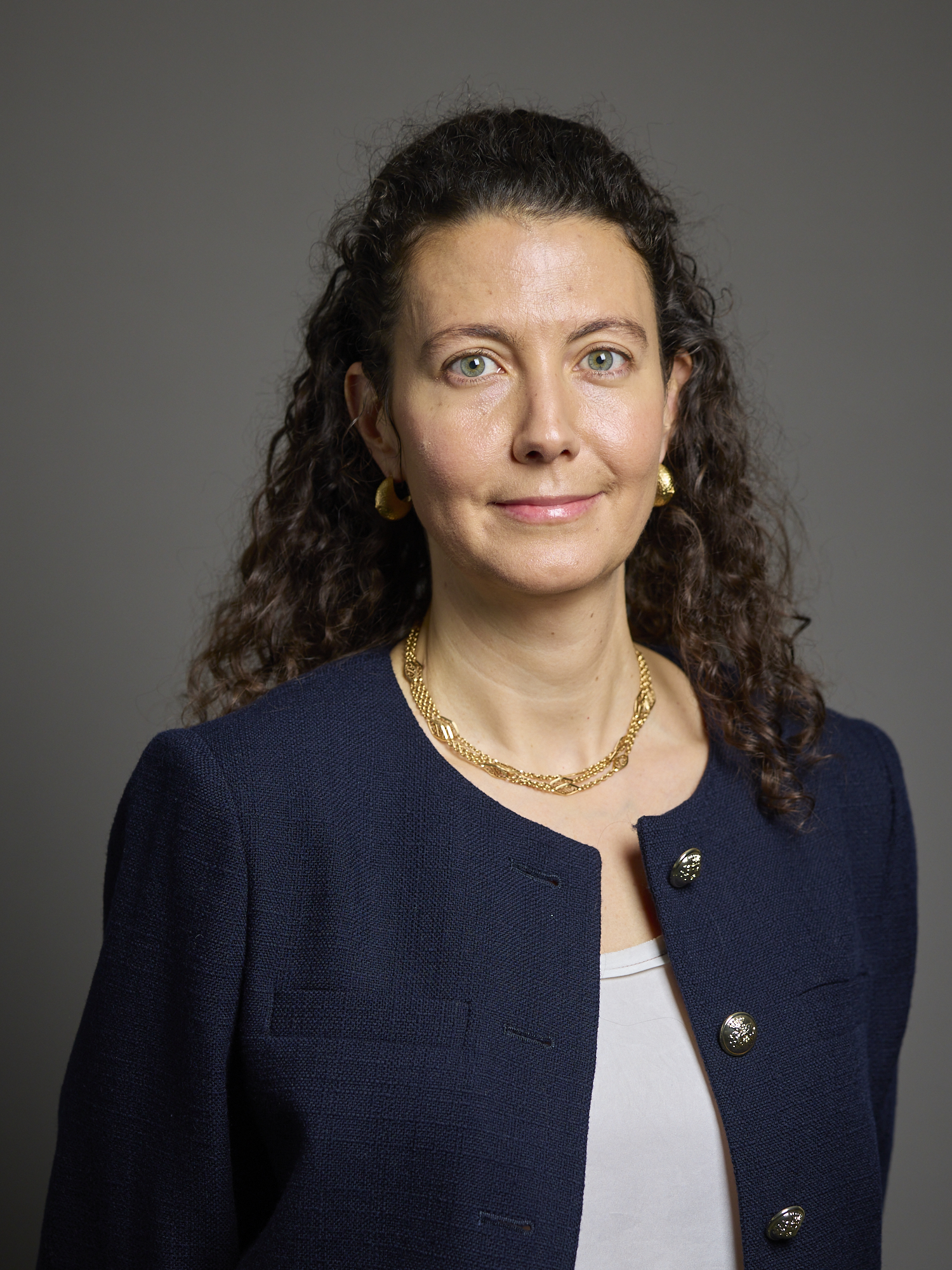
- Official portrait, 2025

Member of the House of Lords
- Lord Temporal
- Life peerage 28 May 2025

Personal details
- Born: July 9, 1983 (age 43)
- Party: Conservative
- Spouse: Simon Adam Wolfson, Baron Wolfson of Aspley Guise
- Parent: Sir William Shawcross (father)
- Relatives: Hartley William Shawcross, Baron Shawcross (grandfather)

Eleanor Joan Georgina Shawcross, Baroness Shawcross-Wolfson (born 9 July 1983), is a British political advisor, who previously served as the Director of the Number 10 Policy Unit under Prime Minister Rishi Sunak. She is a life peer in the House of Lords as part of the 2024 Prime Minister's Resignation Honours given by Rishi Sunak which were announced in April 2025.

The daughter of Sir William Shawcross, Shawcross has worked for Boston Consulting Group, the Bill and Melinda Gates Foundation, and the Blavatnik School of Government at Oxford, as well as several political and governmental roles.

Shawcross worked on Boris Johnson's mayoral campaign, and became a member of the Council of Economic Advisers to the then-shadow Chancellor George Osborne from 2008, and served for 6 years as his deputy chief of staff when Osborne became Chancellor of the Exchequer. After 2016, she served as chief of staff at the Department for Work and Pensions and was subsequently made a non-executive director for 2020–2022.

Shawcross advised Rishi Sunak during his time as Chancellor, and donated £20,000 to his leadership campaign. Sunak appointed her the director of the Number 10 Policy Unit when he became prime minister in October 2022, leading to the New Statesman naming her as the twelfth most powerful right-wing figure in the UK in 2023.

In 2012, Shawcross married Simon Wolfson, Baron Wolfson of Aspley Guise, who is the son of David Wolfson, respectively the current and former chairmen of Next, and both Conservative life peers. They have two sons and a daughter together. Shawcross herself received a life peerage as part of the 2024 Prime Minister's Resignation Honours and was created as Baroness Shawcross–Wolfson, of Aspley Guise in the County of Bedfordshire on 28 May 2025.
