= Andy Heath (music executive) =

British music publishing executive (born 1947)

Andrew Heath CBE (born 1947) is a British music publishing executive.

Having worked in the industry since 1964, Heath has formed two publishing companies of his own, Andrew Heath Music and Heathwave (a company still in operation today). He also formed a partnership with the Beggars Group in 1987 to create Momentum Music, a highly successful company that managed the publishing for Gary Numan, Cocteau Twins, Republica and Bauhaus, which he ran until its sale to Universal Music in early 2001. He remains a director of the Beggars Group (1991–present day) as well as running Beggars Music, the group's publishing wing. He is also a director of IMPEL.

Heath served on the Council of the Music Publishers Association (1989-2008 and President from 1993–97) and served on the boards of the Performing Right Society and the Mechanical-Copyright Protection Society. In January 2008, he was appointed Chairman of British Music Rights. When BMR was subsumed into UK Music in September 2008, Heath became chairman of the new organisation.

Heath was appointed Member of the Order of the British Empire (MBE) in the 2009 New Year Honours for services to music publishing and Commander of the Order of the British Empire (CBE) in the 2019 Birthday Honours for services to music.
