= 2015 United Kingdom general election party spending investigation =

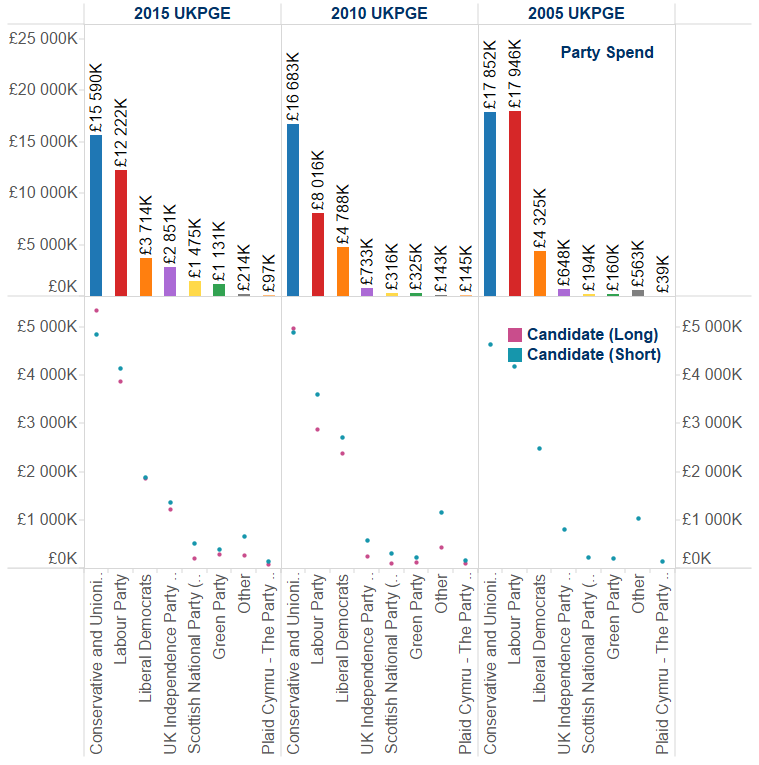
UK Parliamentary General Election party and candidate expenditure 2005–15. These figures are based on all candidate spending returns provided to the Commission by Returning Officers by 31 January 2016, being approximately 86.5% of all candidates who stood in the election.

The United Kingdom General Election 2015 – Party Spending Investigation was a probe involving the UK Electoral Commission, numerous police forces, and the Crown Prosecution Service into spending by political parties and candidates, primarily during the 2015 general election campaign. This co-ordinated investigation has been described as 'an unprecedented and extraordinary situation'.

At national party level, the Electoral Commission fined the three largest parties for breaches of spending regulations, levying the highest fines since its foundation: £20,000 for Labour in October 2016, £20,000 for the Liberal Democrats in December 2016, and £70,000 for the Conservative Party in March 2017. The higher fine for the Conservatives reflected both the extent of the wrongdoing and 'the unreasonable uncooperative conduct by the Party'.

At constituency level, related alleged breaches of spending regulations led police to begin investigations into possible criminal conduct of between 20 and 30 Conservative Party MPs. Charges were not brought against most of those investigated, but on 9 January 2019, a Conservative Party activist, Marion Little, was found guilty on two counts relating to falsifying election expenses and given a nine-month suspended sentence and £5000 fine.

== Background ==
Elections held in the UK are governed by the Political Parties, Elections and Referendums Act 2000 and spending on elections is governed under the Representation of the People Act 1983. Shortly before the election, the Government increased the amount of money that parties and candidates were allowed to spend on the election by 23%, against the advice of the Electoral Commission.

== 2014 and 2015 elections, Conservative Party ==
=== Electoral Commission investigation ===
From 18 February 2016 to 16 March 2017, the Electoral Commission investigated the Conservative party at national level for breaches of spending regulations in the 2014 parliamentary by-elections in Clacton, Newark and Rochester and Strood; the 2014 European Parliament election; and the 2015 general election. (No irregularities were found regarding the European election.)

The Commission was informed by an investigation by Channel 4 News, which revealed that the Conservative Party had spent many thousands of pounds centrally on 'battlebuses' to transport activists, and hotel accommodation for the activists, who went to campaign in marginal constituencies, finding that this expenditure might breach limits on election spending per constituency.

On 12 May 2016, the Commission took the unprecedented step of launching court action to force the Conservative Party to release documents.

The Commission concluded that:

- The Party likely understated the value of the Party's spending on the by-election campaigns.
- The Party Treasurer, Simon Day, 'failed to ensure that the Party's accounting records were sufficient to adequately show and explain the Party's transactions with the candidates and/or their agents' in the by-election campaigns.
- The Party's 2015 General Election spending return was not a complete statement of its campaign spending payments and also failed to include all the required invoices and receipts.

The Commission fined the Party £70,000, noting its lack of co-operation during the investigation.

The Commission found that Simon Day may not have fulfilled his obligations under the Political Parties, Elections and Referendums Act 2000 and referred him for investigation to the Metropolitan Police Service.

=== Police investigation ===
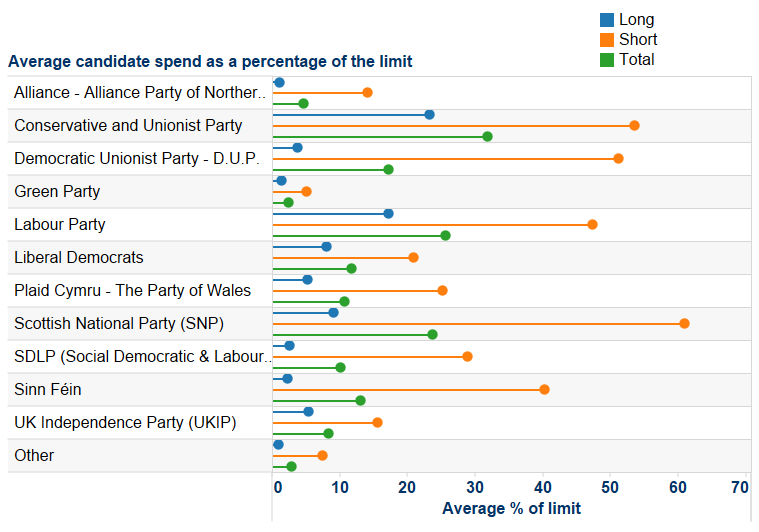
UK General Election 2015 average spending by party candidates as a percentage of spending limit. These figures are based on all candidate spending returns provided to the Commission by Returning Officers by 31 January 2016, being approximately 86.5% of all candidates who stood in the election.

Claims of overspending in the 2014 elections came to light too late for police investigations due to a statute of limitations on such cases. However, the Commission found cause for concern that campaigns in some constituencies breached the Representation of the People Act 1983, and could constitute criminal activity; its report referred the Conservative Party treasurer Simon Day for investigation to the Metropolitan Police Service, and the Commission passed evidence to relevant police forces for investigation and possible referral to the Crown Prosecution Service.

Widely publicised criminal investigations of individual MPs, agents, and other officials followed from the allegations (by mid-June 2016, 17 police forces were investigating 20–30 sitting Conservative MPs). As well as the "battlebus" campaign, letters sent out in the name of David Cameron have been implicated.

14 police forces referred cases to the Crown Prosecution Service for possible prosecution, concerning over 30 people (not all of whom were MPs). These forces were: Avon & Somerset, Cumbria, Derbyshire, Devon & Cornwall, Gloucestershire, Greater Manchester, Kent, Lincolnshire, Metropolitan, Northamptonshire, Nottinghamshire, Staffordshire, West Mercia, West Midlands, and West Yorkshire.

Journalistic commentary noted that the law in this area is complex. Defendants may be found guilty of merely 'illegal practice' (where there is no alleged dishonesty) or the more serious 'corrupt practice' (involving dishonesty). Anyone convicted would have a right to appeal. In June 2016, the journalist David Allen Green opined that 'unless compelling evidence emerges of wrongful and dishonest intention – either on a personal level or as part of a conspiracy – then it is hard to see any charges or criminal prosecutions in respect of the allegations as they currently stand'. However, according to The Independent, 'in theory election results in individual seats could be declared invalid if laws are found to have been broken', and this could lead to new by-elections. No conviction would affect the legal standing of legislation previously passed with the involvement of convicted MPs.

On 10 May 2017, the Crown Prosecution Service announced that it would press no charges in almost all cases, commenting that 'to bring a charge, it must be proved that a suspect knew the return was inaccurate and acted dishonestly in signing the declaration. Although there is evidence to suggest the returns may have been inaccurate, there is insufficient evidence to prove to the criminal standard that any candidate or agent was dishonest'.

However, on 2 June 2017, charges were brought under the Representation of the People Act 1983 against Craig Mackinlay, who was elected Conservative MP for South Thanet in 2015, his agent Nathan Gray, and a party activist, Marion Little. Appearing at Westminster Magistrates' Court on 4 July 2017, the three pleaded not guilty and were released on unconditional bail pending an appearance at Southwark Crown Court on 1 August 2017. The investigation of Party Treasurer Simon Day remained ongoing.

Following some delays to the trial, Gray was acquitted on 13 December 2018 and Mackinlay on 9 January 2018. Little, however, was convicted of two counts relating to falsifying election expenses and given a nine-month suspended prison sentence and fined £5,000. The court concluded that Mackinlay and Gray had signed documents falsified by Little "in good faith, not knowing what she had done".

== 2015 General Election, Labour Party ==
In October 2016, the Labour Party was fined £20,000 by the Electoral Commission for under-reporting of election expenses at national level, which at the time was the largest fine the commission had imposed since being founded in 2001. The Commission noted the party's co-operation in its investigation. The same Channel 4 investigation that identified the Conservative Party's questionable spending failed to find substantial evidence of similar problems in the Labour campaign.

At constituency level, police investigated allegations that several MPs breached local spending limits. In May 2016, Lancashire Constabulary announced that an investigation had been opened into Labour Party expenses following allegations that Cat Smith, MP for Lancaster and Fleetwood broke election spending laws. However, in November 2016 they cleared Smith of any wrongdoing and fully exonerated her. Other cases seem likewise to have been dropped.

== 2015 General Election, Liberal Democrat Party ==
In December 2016, the Liberal Democrats were also fined £20,000 for undeclared spending at national level; again, the Electoral Commission noted their co-operation with the investigation.

Although a few MPs saw police investigating allegations of breaching spending limits, all cases appear to have been swiftly dropped.

== Responses ==
In March 2017, the chair of the Electoral Commission, John Holmes, argued in response to the investigations that the sanctions at the Commission's disposal needed to be extended, saying that 'there is a risk that some political parties might come to view the payment of these fines as a cost of doing business; the Commission therefore needs to be able to impose sanctions that are proportionate to the levels of spending now routinely handled by parties and campaigners'.

When the UK Government called the 2017 United Kingdom general election in April 2017, there was widespread press speculation that one motivation was fear of impending prosecutions of Conservative MPs, most prominently by Scotland's First Minister, Nicola Sturgeon.

Responding to the CPS's decision not to prosecute most individuals, the Conservative Prime Minister Theresa May claimed on 10 May 2017 that 'we have seen all the major parties, and the Scottish nationalists, being fined', but in fact the Scottish National Party had not transgressed electoral law and accordingly had not been fined. May also commented that the CPS had 'confirmed what we believed all along and said all along which was the local spending was properly reported and the candidates have done nothing wrong', which journalists also noted to be untrue.

Karl McCartney, who had been elected Conservative MP for Lincoln in 2015 and had been investigated, said the police investigation was 'no more than a politically-motivated witch-hunt', called for the resignation of 'the Executive Team and Senior Management Group' of the Electoral Commission, and the abolition of the Commission itself. Emails leaked in March 2017 had previously revealed him saying 'we didn't create this mess, the clever dicks at CCHQ (Conservative Campaign Headquarters) did'. The Electoral Commission responded that 'the commission’s investigations team carry out independent, robust and impartial investigations, acting fully in accordance with our enforcement policy and with complete impartiality'.

In the course of the case against Mackinlay, the Supreme Court judged that 'the statutory requirement for an election candidate to declare “notional” expenditure incurred on his or her behalf during a campaign, as might arise where a national party provided additional campaigning support in the constituency, was not limited to campaigning activity that had been authorised by the candidate or his agent'. In May 2019, it emerged that the government was in consequence considering introducing primary legislation so that candidates for election, and their agents, would no longer automatically be held responsible if resources were donated to the campaign (including by their own national parties).

== Related investigations ==
=== Unlawful spending by UKIP ===
In 2016-18, the European Parliament found that the UK Independence Party had unlawfully spent over €173,000 of EU funding on the party's 2015 UK election campaign, via the Alliance for Direct Democracy in Europe and the affiliated Institute for Direct Democracy. The Parliament required the repayment of the mis-spent funds and denied the organisations some other funding. It also found that UKIP MEPs had unlawfully spent EU money on other assistance for national campaigning purposes during 2014-16 and docked their salaries to recoup the mis-spent funds.

=== Information Commissioner's Office ===
On 17 May 2017, the Information Commissioner's Office opened an investigation into data analytics for political purposes, whose purview included the 2015 general election, as well as possible unlawful campaigning in the 2016 EU referendum. The investigation issued a report, but was not at the time able to include information on UKIP due to their lack of co-operation. As of April 2019, the investigation was in this respect ongoing.
