= List of barons in the peerages of Britain and Ireland =

Peerages and baronetcies of Britain and Ireland
Extant	All
Dukes	Dukedoms
Marquesses	Marquessates
Earls	Earldoms
Viscounts	Viscountcies
Barons	Baronies
Baronets	Baronetcies

This is a list of the present and extant barons (Lords of Parliament, in Scottish terms) in the Peerages of England, Scotland, Great Britain, Ireland, and the United Kingdom. Note that it does not include those extant baronies which have become merged (either through marriage or elevation) with higher peerage dignities and are today only seen as subsidiary titles. For a more complete list, which adds these "hidden" baronies as well as extinct, dormant, abeyant, and forfeit ones, see List of Baronies.

This page includes all life barons, including the Law Lords created under the Appellate Jurisdiction Act 1876. However hereditary peers with the rank of viscount or higher holding also a life peerage are not included.

== Order of precedence ==
Heraldic representation of the Coronet of a British Baron.

The general order of precedence among barons is:

1. Barons of England
2. Lords of Parliament of Scotland
3. Barons of Great Britain
4. Barons of Ireland created before 1801
5. Barons of the United Kingdom and Barons in the Peerage of Ireland created after 1801

Key
Heir apparent to the peerage
Heir presumptive to the peerage

However barons of Ireland created after the Union of 1801 yield precedence to earlier created barons of the United Kingdom. They are listed in italics, in their place in the order of precedence. Life peers take precedence with other barons of the United Kingdom; they are listed separately because the only hereditary baronies created since 1965 have been subsidiary titles: Prince Andrew, Duke of York (later Andrew Mountbatten-Windsor), who held the subsidiary title of Baron Killyleagh, Prince William, Duke of Cambridge, who holds the subsidiary title of Baron Carrickfergus, and Prince Harry, Duke of Sussex, who holds the subsidiary title of Baron Kilkeel.

== Barons of England ==
Title	Created	Arms	Incumbent	Other baronies	Heir
Baron de Ros	1264		Peter Maxwell, 27th Baron de Ros		Finbar Maxwell
Baron Mowbray	1283		James Charles Peter Stourton, 28th Baron Mowbray	Baron Segrave (England, 1295)	James Stourton
Baron Mowbray	1283		James Charles Peter Stourton, 28th Baron Mowbray	Baron Stourton (England, 1448)	James Stourton
Baron Hastings	1295		Delaval Astley, 23rd Baron Hastings		Jacob Astley
Baron Furnivall	1295		Patricia Mary Bence, 20th Baroness Furnivall		Walton Francis Petre Hornsby
Baron FitzWalter	1295		Julian Plumptre, 22nd Baron FitzWalter		Edward Plumptre
Baron Clinton	1299		Charles Fane-Trefusis, 23rd Baron Clinton		Edward Fane-Trefusis
Baron de Clifford	1299		Miles Russell, 28th Baron de Clifford		Edward Russell
Baron Zouche	1308		William Frankland, 19th Baron Zouche		Thomas Frankland
Baroness Willoughby de Eresby	1313		Jane Heathcote-Drummond-Willoughby, 28th Baroness Willoughby de Eresby		Sebastian Miller and Sir James Aird, 5th Baronet, co-heirs presumptive
Baron Strabolgi	1318		Andrew Kenworthy, 12th Baron Strabolgi		Hamish Kenworthy (third cousin)
Baroness Dacre	1321		Emily Douglas-Home, 29th Baroness Dacre		Arthur Beamish
Baron Darcy de Knayth	1332		Casper Ingrams, 19th Baron Darcy de Knayth		Thomas Ingrams
Baron Cromwell	1375		Godfrey John Bewicke-Copley, 7th Baron Cromwell	Baron Cromwell of Tattershall (United Kingdom, life peerage, 2026)	David Bewicke-Copley
Baron Camoys	1383		William Stonor, 8th Baron Camoys	Baron Stonor (United Kingdom, life peerage, 2026)	Ralph Thomas Stonor
Baron Grey of Codnor	1397		Richard Cornwall-Legh, 6th Baron Grey of Codnor		Richard Cornwall-Leigh
Baron Berkeley	1421		Anthony Gueterbock, 18th Baron Berkeley	Baron Gueterbock (United Kingdom, life peerage, 2000)	Thomas Gueterbock
Baron Latymer	1432		Crispin James Alan Nevill Money-Coutts, 9th Baron Latymer		Drummond Money-Coutts
Baron Dudley	1440		Jeremy William Guilford Wallace, 16th Baron Dudley		Dominic Wallace
Baron Saye and Sele	1447		Martin Fiennes, 22nd Baron Saye and Sele		Guy Fiennes
Baron Berners	1455		Rupert Kirkham, 17th Baron Berners		Edward Kirkham
Baron Herbert	1461		David Seyfried-Herbert, 19th Baron Herbert		Oliver Seyfried-Herbert
Baron Willoughby de Broke	1491		Leopold Verney, 21st Baron Willoughby de Broke		Rupert Verney
Baron Vaux of Harrowden	1523		Richard Gilbey, 12th Baron Vaux of Harrowden	Baron Gilbey (United Kingdom, life peerage, 2026)	Alexander Gilbey
Baroness Braye	1529		Mary Aubrey-Fletcher, 8th Baroness Braye		Linda Fothergill (second cousin)
Baron Burgh	1529		Alexander Leith, 8th Baron Burgh		Alexander Leith
Baron Wharton	1544		Myles Robertson, 12th Baron Wharton		Meghan Robertson (daughter)
Baron St John of Bletso	1559		Anthony St John, 22nd Baron St John of Bletso		Oliver St John
Baroness Howard de Walden	1597		Hazel Czernin, 10th Baroness Howard de Walden		Peter Czernin
Baron Petre	1603		John Petre, 18th Baron Petre		Dominic Petre
Baron Dormer	1615		William Dormer, 18th Baron Dormer		Hugo Dormer
Baron Teynham	1616		David Roper-Curzon, 21st Baron Teynham		Henry Roper-Curzon
Baron Strange	1628		Adam Drummond of Megginch, 17th Baron Strange		John Drummond
Baron Stafford	1640		Francis Fitzherbert, 15th Baron Stafford		Benjamin FitzHerbert
Baron Byron	1643		Robert Byron, 13th Baron Byron		Charles Byron
Baron Lucas of Crudwell	1663		Ralph Palmer, 12th Baron Lucas	Lord Dingwall (Scotland, 1609)	Lewis Palmer
Baroness Arlington	1664		Jennifer Forwood, 11th Baroness Arlington		Patrick Forwood
Baron Clifford of Chudleigh	1672		Thomas Clifford, 14th Baron Clifford of Chudleigh		Alexander Clifford
Baron Barnard	1698		Henry Francis Cecil Vane, 12th Baron Barnard		William Vane

== Lords of Parliament of Scotland ==
Title	Created	Arms	Incumbent	Other baronies	Heir
Lord Forbes	1442		Malcolm Forbes, 23rd Lord Forbes		Neil Forbes, Master of Forbes
Lord Gray	1444		Andrew Campbell-Gray, 23rd Lord Gray		Alexander Campbell-Gray, Master of Gray
Lady Saltoun	1445		Katharine Fraser, 22nd Lady Saltoun		Alexander Fraser, Master of Saltoun
Lord Sinclair	1449		Matthew Murray Kennedy St Clair, 18th Lord Sinclair		Harry St Clair, Master of Sinclair
Lord Borthwick	1452		James Henry Alexander Borthwick, 25th Lord Borthwick		Malcolm Henry Borthwick, Master of Borthwick
Lord Lovat	1464		Simon Fraser, 16th Lord Lovat	Baron Lovat (United Kingdom, 1837)	Jack Fraser, Master of Lovat (brother)
Lord Sempill	1488		James William Stuart Whitemore Sempill, 21st Lord Sempill		Francis Sempill, Master of Sempill
Lady Herries of Terregles	1490		Jane Kerr, Marchioness of Lothian, 16th Lady Herries of Terregles		Lady Clare Hurd, Mistress of Terregles (daughter)
Lord Elphinstone	1510		Alexander Elphinstone, 19th Lord Elphinstone	Baron Elphinstone (United Kingdom, 1885)	Jago Elphintone, Master of Elphinstone
Lord Torphichen	1564		James Sandilands, 15th Lord Torphichen		Robert Sandilands (first cousin twice removed)
Lady Kinloss	1602		Teresa Freeman-Grenville, 13th Lady Kinloss		Hester Haworth, Mistress of Kinloss (sister)
Lady Balfour of Burleigh	1607		Victoria Bruce-Winkler, 9th Lady Balfour of Burleigh		Laetitia Bruce-Winkler, Mistress of Burleigh (daughter)
Lord Napier	1627		Francis Napier, 15th Lord Napier	Baron Ettrick (United Kingdom, 1872)	Sophie Napier, Mistress of Napier (daughter)
Lord Fairfax of Cameron	1627		Nicholas Fairfax, 14th Lord Fairfax of Cameron		Edward Fairfax, Master of Fairfax
Lord Reay	1628		Aeneas Mackay, 15th Lord Reay	Baron Reay of Reay (United Kingdom, life peerage, 2026)	Alexander Mackay, Master of Reay
Lord Elibank	1643		Robert Erskine-Murray, 15th Lord Elibank		Timothy Erskine-Murray, Master of Elibank (brother)
Lord Belhaven and Stenton	1647		Frederick Hamilton, 14th Lord Belhaven and Stenton		William Hamilton, Master of Belhaven
Lord Rollo	1651		David Rollo, 14th Lord Rollo	Baron Dunning (United Kingdom, 1869)	James Rollo, Master of Rollo
Lord Polwarth	1690		Andrew Hepburne-Scott, 11th Lord Polwarth		William Hepburne-Scott, Master of Polwarth

== Barons of Great Britain ==
Title	Created	Arms	Incumbent	Other baronies	Heir
Baron Middleton	1712		Michael Charles James Willoughby, 13th Baron Middleton		James Willoughby
Baron Walpole	1723		Jonathan Walpole, 11th Baron Walpole	Baron Walpole (Great Britain, 1756)	Benedict Walpole (brother)
Baron Monson	1728		Nicholas Monson, 12th Baron Monson		Andrew Monson (brother)
Baron Boston	1761		George Boteler Irby, 11th Baron Boston		Thomas Irby
Baron Vernon	1762		Anthony Vernon-Harcourt, 11th Baron Vernon		Simon Vernon-Harcourt
Baron Hawke	1776		William Hawke, 12th Baron Hawke		None
Baron Brownlow	1776		Peregrine Cust, 8th Baron Brownlow		None
Baron Foley	1776		Thomas Foley, 9th Baron Foley		Rupert Foley (sixth cousin)
Baron Dynevor	1780		Hugo Rhys, 10th Baron Dynevor		Robert Rhys (second cousin)
Baron Walsingham	1780		John de Grey, 9th Baron Walsingham		Robert de Grey
Baron Bagot	1780		Charles Bagot, 10th Baron Bagot		Richard Bagot (second cousin once removed)
Baron Southampton	1780		Edward FitzRoy, 7th Baron Southampton		Charles FitzRoy
Baron Grantley	1782		Richard Norton, 8th Baron Grantley		Francis Norton (brother)
Baron Rodney	1782		Johnny Rodney, 11th Baron Rodney		Nicholas Rodney (first cousin once removed)
Baron Somers	1784		Philip Somers-Cocks, 9th Baron Somers		Martin Cocks (fourth cousin twice removed)
Baron Suffield	1786		John Harbord-Hamond, 13th Baron Suffield		Samuel Harbord-Hamond
Baron Kenyon	1788		Nicholas Tyrell-Kenyon, 7th Baron Kenyon		Roger Kenyon (third cousin once removed)
Baron Braybrooke	1788		Richard Neville, 11th Baron Braybrooke		Edward Neville
Baron Thurlow	1792		Roualeyn Hovell-Thurlow-Cumming-Bruce, 9th Baron Thurlow		Nicholas Hovell-Thurlow-Cumming-Bruce
Baron Auckland	1793		Robert Eden, 10th Baron Auckland		Henry Eden (first cousin)
Baron Carrington	1797 (Note: The Lord Carrington ranks higher in precedence as the current Lord Great Chamberlain than as a baron.)		Rupert Carington, 7th Baron Carrington		Robert Carington
Baron Bolton	1797		Thomas Orde-Powlett, 9th Baron Bolton		Hector Orde-Powlett
Baron Lilford	1797		Mark Powys, 8th Baron Lilford		Robert Powys (second cousin once removed)

== Barons of Ireland ==
Title	Created	Arms	Incumbent	Other baronies	Heir
Baron Kingsale	1340?		Nevinson de Courcy, 31st Baron Kingsale		Joseph de Courcy (kinsman)
Baron Dunsany	1439?		Randal Plunkett, 21st Baron of Dunsany		Oliver Plunkett (brother)
Baron Dunboyne	1541		Richard Butler, 20th/30th Baron Dunboyne		Caspian Butler
Baron Louth	1541		Jonathan Plunkett, 17th Baron Louth		Matthew Plunkett
Baron Inchiquin	1543		Conor John Anthony O'Brien, 19th Baron Inchiquin		Fionn O'Brien
Baron Digby	1620		Henry Digby, 13th Baron Digby	Baron Digby (Great Britain, 1765)	Edward Digby
Baron Carbery	1715		Michael Evans-Freke, 12th Baron Carbery		Dominic Evans-Freke
Baron Aylmer	1718		Julian Aylmer, 14th Baron Aylmer		Michael Aylmer
Baron Farnham	1756		Simon Maxwell, 13th Baron Farnham		Robin Maxwell
Baron Lisle	1758		Nicholas Lysaght, 9th Baron Lisle		David Lysaght (brother)
Baron Newborough	1776		Robert Wynn, 8th Baron Newborough		Anthony Wynn (first cousin)
Baron Macdonald	1776		Godfrey Macdonald, 8th Baron Macdonald		Hugo Macdonald, Younger of Macdonald
Baron Kensington	1776		Hugh Edwardes, 8th Baron Kensington	Baron Kensington (United Kingdom, 1886)	William Edwardes
Baron Massy	1776		David Massy, 10th Baron Massy		John Massy (brother)
Baron Muskerry	1781		Robert Deane, 9th Baron Muskerry		Jonathan Deane
Baron Sheffield	1783		Richard Stanley, 8th Baron Sheffield	Baron Stanley of Alderley (United Kingdom, 1839)	Charles Stanley (brother)
Baron Sheffield	1783		Richard Stanley, 8th Baron Sheffield	Baron Eddisbury (United Kingdom, 1848)	Charles Stanley (brother)
Baron Kilmaine	1789		John Browne, 8th Baron Kilmaine		Mark Caulfield-Browne (sixth cousin once removed)
Baron Auckland	1789		Robert Eden, 10th Baron Auckland	Baron Auckland (Great Britain, 1793)	Henry Eden (first cousin)
Baron Waterpark	1792		Roderick Cavendish, 8th Baron Waterpark		Luke Cavendish
Baron Graves	1794		Timothy Graves, 10th Baron Graves		None
Baron Huntingfield	1796		Joshua Vanneck, 7th Baron Huntingfield		Gerald Vanneck
Baron Carrington	1796		Rupert Carington, 7th Baron Carrington	Baron Carrington (Great Britain, 1797)	Robert Carington
Baron Rossmore	1796		Benedict Westenra, 8th Baron Rossmore	Baron Rossmore (United Kingdom, 1838)	None
Baron Hotham	1797		Henry Hotham, 8th Baron Hotham		William Hotham
Baron Crofton	1797		Edward Crofton, 8th Baron Crofton		Charles Crofton (brother)
Baron ffrench	1798		Robuck ffrench, 8th Baron ffrench		None
Baron Henley	1799		Oliver Eden, 8th Baron Henley	Baron Northington (United Kingdom, 1885)	John Eden
Baron Langford	1800		Owain Rowley-Conwy, 10th Baron Langford		Owain Rowley-Conway
Baron Dufferin and Claneboye	1800		John Blackwood, 11th Baron Dufferin and Claneboye		Francis Blackwood
Baron Henniker	1800		Mark Henniker-Major, 9th Baron Henniker	Baron Hartismere (United Kingdom, 1886)	Edward Henniker-Major
Baron Ventry	1800		Andrew de Moleyns, 8th Baron Ventry		Francis Daubeney de Moleyns
Baron Dunalley	1800		Henry Prittie, 7th Baron Dunalley		Joel Prittie
Baron Clanmorris	1800		Derek Bingham, 9th Baron Clanmorris		None
Baron Ashtown	1800		Roderick Trench, 8th Baron Ashtown		Timothy Trench

== Barons of the United Kingdom ==
=== Hereditary barons ===
Irish baronies created after 1801 yield precedence to older baronies of the United Kingdom.

Title	Created	Arms	Incumbent	Other baronies	Heir
Baron Ellenborough	1802		Rupert Law, 9th Baron Ellenborough		James Law
Baron Rendlesham	1806 (Note: The Baron Rendlesham was created after the Acts of Union 1800. It takes precedence after earlier Baronies of the United Kingdom.)		Charles Thellusson, 9th Baron Rendlesham		James Thellusson (first cousin)
Baron Manners	1807		John Manners, 6th Baron Manners		John Manners
Baron Castlemaine	1812 (Note: The Baron Castlemaine was created after the Acts of Union 1800. It takes precedence after earlier Baronies of the United Kingdom.)		Roland Handcock, 8th Baron Castlemaine		Ronan Handcock
Baron Decies	1812 (Note: The Baron Decies was created after the Acts of Union 1800. It takes precedence after earlier Baronies of the United Kingdom.)		Marcus Beresford, 7th Baron Decies		Robert Beresford
Baron Churchill	1815		Michael Spencer, 7th Baron Churchill		David Spencer (brother)
Baron Harris	1815		Michael Harris, 9th Baron Harris		John Harris (brother)
Baron Garvagh	1818 (Note: The Baron Garvagh was created after the Acts of Union 1800. It takes precedence after earlier Baronies of the United Kingdom.)		Spencer Canning, 6th Baron Garvagh		Stratford Canning
Baron Ravensworth	1821		Thomas Liddell, 9th Baron Ravensworth		Henry Liddell
Baron Delamere	1821		Hugh Cholmondeley, 6th Baron Delamere		Henry Cholmondeley (brother)
Baron Forester	1821		Charles Weld-Forester, 9th Baron Forester		Brook Weld-Forester
Baron Rayleigh	1821		John Gerald Strutt, 6th Baron Rayleigh		John Strutt
Baron Gifford	1824		Anthony Gifford, 6th Baron Gifford		Thomas Gifford
Baron Feversham	1826		Jasper Duncombe, 7th Baron Feversham		Orlando Duncombe
Baron Seaford	1826		Colin Ellis, 6th Baron Seaford		Benjamin Ellis
Baron Plunket	1827		Tyrone Plunket, 9th Baron Plunket		Rory Plunket
Baron Heytesbury	1828		James Holmes à Court, 7th Baron Heytesbury		Peter Holmes à Court (kinsman)
Baron Skelmersdale	1828		Andrew Bootle-Wilbraham, 8th Baron Skelmersdale		Daniel Bootle-Wilbraham
Baron Wynford	1829		John Best, 9th Baron Wynford		Harry Best
Baron Talbot of Malahide	1831 (Note: The Baron Talbot of Malahide was created after the Acts of Union 1800. It takes precedence after earlier Baronies of the United Kingdom.)		Richard Arundell, 11th Baron Talbot of Malahide		John Arundell
Baron Kilmarnock	1831		Robin Boyd, 8th Baron Kilmarnock		Simon Boyd
Baron Poltimore	1831		Mark Bampfylde, 7th Baron Poltimore		Henry Bampfylde
Baron Mostyn	1831		Gregory Mostyn, 7th Baron Mostyn		Roger Lloyd-Mostyn (third cousin twice removed)
Baron de Saumarez	1831		Eric Saumarez, 7th Baron de Saumarez		Victor Saumarez (brother)
Baron Denman	1834		Richard Denman, 6th Baron Denman		Robert Denman
Baron Carew	1834 (Note: The Baron Carew was created after the Acts of Union 1800. It takes precedence after earlier Baronies of the United Kingdom.)		William Conolly-Carew, 8th Baron Carew	Baron Carew (United Kingdom, 1838)	Patrick Connolly-Carew
Baron Abinger	1835		James Scarlett, 9th Baron Abinger		Harry Scarlett (nephew)
Baron Ashburton	1835		Mark Baring, 8th Baron Ashburton		Frederick Baring
Baron Hatherton	1835		Edward Littleton, 8th Baron Hatherton		Thomas Edward Littleton
Baron Stratheden	1836		David Campbell, 7th Baron Stratheden	Baron Campbell (United Kingdom, 1841)	None
Baron Oranmore and Browne	1836 (Note: The Baron Oranmore and Browne was created after the Acts of Union 1800. It takes precedence after earlier Baronies of the United Kingdom.)		Dominick Browne, 5th Baron Oranmore and Browne	Baron Mereworth (United Kingdom, 1926)	Shaun Browne (nephew)
Baron de Mauley	1838		Rupert Ponsonby, 7th Baron de Mauley	Baron de Mauley of Canford (United Kingdom, life peerage, 2026)	George Ponsonby (brother)
Baron Wrottesley	1838		Clifton Wrottesley, 6th Baron Wrottesley		Victor Wrottesley
Baron Sudeley	1838		Nicholas Hanbury-Tracy, 8th Baron Sudeley		Timothy Hanbury-Tracy (half-brother)
Baron Methuen	1838		James Methuen-Campbell, 8th Baron Methuen		Thomas Methuen-Campbell (half-brother)
Baron Leigh	1839		Christopher Leigh, 6th Baron Leigh		Rupert Leigh
Baron Monteagle of Brandon	1839		Charles Spring Rice, 7th Baron Monteagle of Brandon		Jonathan Rice (first cousin)
Baron Congleton	1841		John Parnell, 9th Baron Congleton		Christopher Parnell
Baron Vivian	1841		Charles Vivian, 7th Baron Vivian		Thomas Vivian (first cousin)
Baron Bellew	1847 (Note: The Baron Bellew was created after the Acts of Union 1800. It takes precedence after earlier Baronies of the United Kingdom.)		Bryan Bellew, 8th Baron Bellew		Anthony Bellew
Baron Londesborough	1850		Richard Denison, 9th Baron Londesborough	Baron Londesborough of Richmond Hill (United Kingdom, life peerage, 2026)	James Denison
Baron de Freyne	1851		Fulke French, 8th Baron de Freyne		Alexander French
Baron Raglan	1852		Inigo Somerset, 7th Baron Raglan		Ivo Somerset (brother)
Baron Belper	1856		Richard Strutt, 5th Baron Belper		Michael Strutt
Baron Fermoy	1856 (Note: The Baron Fermoy was created after the Acts of Union 1800. It takes precedence after earlier Baronies of the United Kingdom.)		Maurice Roche, 6th Baron Fermoy		Edmund Roche (brother)
Baron Chesham	1858		Charles Cavendish, 7th Baron Chesham		Oliver Cavendish
Baron Churston	1858		Benjamin Francis Anthony Yarde-Buller, 6th Baron Churston		Joseph Francis Yarde-Buller
Baron Leconfield	1859		Max Wyndham, 7th Baron Leconfield	Baron Egremont (United Kingdom, 1963)	George Wyndham
Baron Lyveden	1859		Colin Vernon, 8th Baron Lyveden		Robert Vernon (uncle)
Baron Brougham and Vaux	1860		Charles Brougham, 6th Baron Brougham and Vaux		Henry Brougham
Baron Westbury	1861		Richard Bethell, 6th Baron Westbury		Alexander Bethell
Baron Annaly	1863		Luke White, 6th Baron Annaly		Luke White
Baron Northbrook	1866		Francis Baring, 6th Baron Northbrook		None
Baron Hylton	1866		Raymond Jolliffe, 5th Baron Hylton		William Jolliffe
Baron Penrhyn	1866		Simon Douglas-Pennant, 7th Baron Penrhyn		Edward Douglas-Pennant
Baron O'Neill	1868		Raymond Chichester, 4th Baron O'Neill		Shane O'Neill
Baron Napier of Magdala	1868		Robert Napier, 6th Baron Napier of Magdala		James Napier
Baron Rathdonnell	1868 (Note: The Baron Rathdonnell was created after the Acts of Union 1800. It takes precedence after earlier Baronies of the United Kingdom.)		William McClintock-Bunbury, 6th Baron Rathdonnell		Thomas McClintock-Bunbury
Baron Acton	1869		John Lyon-Dalberg-Acton, 5th Baron Acton		Robert Lyon-Dalberg-Acton (uncle)
Baron Wolverton	1869		Miles Glyn, 8th Baron Wolverton		Jonathan Glyn (half-brother)
Baron O'Hagan	1870		Richard Strachey, 5th Baron O'Hagan		Columba Strachey
Baron Sandhurst	1871		Guy Mansfield, 6th Baron Sandhurst		Edward Mansfield
Baron Ettrick	1872		Francis Napier, 6th Baron Ettrick		Nicholas Alexander John Napier (brother)
Baron Aberdare	1873		Alastair Bruce, 5th Baron Aberdare		Hector Bruce
Baron Moncreiff	1874		Rhoderick Moncreiff, 6th Baron Moncreiff		Harry Moncreiff
Baron Coleridge	1874		James Coleridge, 6th Baron Coleridge		Samuel Coleridge (uncle)
Baron Cottesloe	1874		Thomas Fremantle, 6th Baron Cottesloe		Edward Fremantle (uncle)
Baron Hampton	1874		John Pakington, 7th Baron Hampton	Baron Hampton of Newington Green (United Kingdom, life peerage, 2026)	Charles Pakington
Baron Harlech	1876		Jasset Ormsby-Gore, 7th Baron Harlech	Baron Harlech of Glyn Cywarch (United Kingdom, life peerage, 2026)	Teo Francis Ormsby-Gore
Baron Tollemache	1876		John Tollemache, 5th Baron Tollemache		Edward Tollemache
Baron Gerard	1876		Anthony Gerard, 5th Baron Gerard		Rupert Gerard
Baron Sackville	1876		Robert Sackville-West, 7th Baron Sackville		Arthur Sackville-West
Baron Norton	1878		James Adderley, 8th Baron Norton		Edward Adderley
Baron Trevor	1880		Marke Hill-Trevor, 5th Baron Trevor		Iain Hill-Trevor (brother)
Baron Ampthill	1881		David Russell, 5th Baron Ampthill		Anthony Russell (brother)
Baron Derwent	1881		Francis Vanden-Bempde-Johnstone, 6th Baron Derwent		None
Baron Hothfield	1881		Anthony Tufton, 6th Baron Hothfield		William Tufton
Baron Tennyson	1884		David Harold Alexander Tennyson, 6th Baron Tennyson		Alan Tennyson (brother)
Baron Strathspey	1884		Michael Grant, 7th Baron Strathspey		None
Baron Monk Bretton	1884		Christopher Mark Dodson, 4th Baron Monk Bretton		Ben Dodson
Baron Northbourne	1884		Charles James, 6th Baron Northbourne		Henry James
Baron Rothschild	1885		Nathaniel Rothschild, 5th Baron Rothschild		James Rothschild (first cousin)
Baron Revelstoke	1885		Alexander Rupert Baring, 7th Baron Revelstoke		Thomas Baring (brother)
Baron Monkswell	1885		James Collier, 6th Baron Monkswell		Robert Collier (brother)
Baron Ashbourne	1885		Edward Gibson, 5th Baron Ashbourne		Edward Gibson
Baron St Oswald	1885		Charles Winn, 6th Baron St Oswald		Rowland Winn
Baron Montagu of Beaulieu	1885		Ralph Douglas-Scott-Montagu, 4th Baron Montagu of Beaulieu		Jonathan Douglas-Scott-Montagu (half-brother)
Baron Hindlip	1886		Henry Allsopp, 7th Baron Hindlip		Jasper Allsop
Baron Grimthorpe	1886		Edward Beckett, 5th Baron Grimthorpe		Harry Becket
Baron Hamilton of Dalzell	1886		Gavin Hamilton, 5th Baron Hamilton of Dalzell		Francis Hamilton
Baron St Levan	1887		James St Aubyn, 5th Baron St Levan		Hugh St Aubyn
Baron Basing	1887		Stuart Sclater-Booth, 6th Baron Basing		Luke Sclater-Booth
Baron de Ramsey	1887		John Ailwyn Fellowes, 4th Baron de Ramsey		Frederick Fellowes
Baron Addington	1887		Dominic Hubbard, 6th Baron Addington	Baron Hubbard (United Kingdom, life peerage, 2026)	Michael Hubbard (brother)
Baron Savile	1888		John Lumley-Savile, 4th Baron Savile		James Lumley-Savile (half-brother)
Baron Ashcombe	1892		Mark Cubitt, 5th Baron Ashcombe	Baron Ashcombe of Boldre (United Kingdom, life peerage, 2026)	Richard Cubitt
Baron Crawshaw	1892		David Gerald Brooks, 5th Baron Crawshaw		Edward Brooks (nephew)
Baron Amherst of Hackney	1892		Hugh Cecil, 5th Baron Amherst of Hackney		Jack Cecil
Baron Newton	1892		Richard Legh, 5th Baron Newton		Piers Legh
Baron Dunleath	1892		Brian Mulholland, 6th Baron Dunleath		Andrew Mulholland
Baron Swansea	1893		Richard Vivian, 5th Baron Swansea		James Vivian
Baron Aldenham	1896		Vicary Gibbs, 6th Baron Aldenham	Baron Hunsdon (United Kingdom, 1923)	Humprey Gibbs
Baron HolmPatrick	1897		Ion Hamilton, 5th Baron HolmPatrick		Ross Andrew James Hamilton (nephew)
Baron Burton	1897		Evan Baillie, 4th Baron Burton		James Baillie
Baron Glanusk	1899		Christopher Bailey, 5th Baron Glanusk		Charles Bailey
Baron Cranworth	1899		Philip Gurdon, 3rd Baron Cranworth		Sascha Gurdon
Baron Avebury	1900		Lyulph Lubbock, 5th Baron Avebury		Alexander Lubbock
Baron Killanin	1900		Red Morris, 4th Baron Killanin		Luke Morris
Baron Strathcona and Mount Royal	1900		Alexander Howard, 5th Baron Strathcona and Mount Royal		Angus Howard
Baron Kinross	1902		Christopher Balfour, 5th Baron Kinross		Alan Balfour
Baron Shuttleworth	1902		Charles Kay-Shuttleworth, 5th Baron Shuttleworth		Thomas Kay-Shuttleworth
Baron Grenfell	1902		Julian Grenfell, 3rd Baron Grenfell	Baron Grenfell of Kilvey (United Kingdom, life peerage, 2000)	Richard Grenfell (first cousin)
Baron Redesdale	1902		Rupert Mitford, 6th Baron Redesdale	Baron Mitford (United Kingdom, life peerage, 2000)	Bertram Mitford
Baron Burnham	1903		Henry Lawson, 7th Baron Burnham		None
Baron Biddulph	1903		Anthony Maitland Biddulph, 5th Baron Biddulph		Robert Maitland Biddulph
Baron Ritchie of Dundee	1905		Charles Ritchie, 6th Baron Ritchie of Dundee		Sebastian Ritchie
Baron Hemphill	1906		Charles Martyn-Hemphill, 6th Baron Hemphill		Richard Martyn-Hemphill
Baron Joicey	1906		James Joicey, 5th Baron Joicey		William Joicey
Baron Nunburnholme	1906		Stephen Wilson, 6th Baron Nunburnholme		Charles Wilson
Baron Swaythling	1907		Charles Montagu, 5th Baron Swaythling		Rupert Montagu (first cousin)
Baron Blyth	1907		James Blyth, 5th Baron Blyth		Hugo Blyth
Baron Marchamley	1908		William Whiteley, 4th Baron Marchamley		Leon Whiteley
Baron Gorell	1909		John Barnes, 5th Baron Gorell		Oliver Barnes
Baron Fisher	1909		Patrick Fisher, 4th Baron Fisher of Kilverstone		Benjamin Fisher
Baron Kilbracken	1909		Christopher Godley, 4th Baron Kilbracken		James Godley
Baron Hardinge of Penshurst	1910		Julian Hardinge, 4th Baron Hardinge of Penshurst		Hugh Hardinge (brother)
Baron de Villiers	1910		Alexander de Villiers, 4th Baron de Villiers		None
Baron Glenconner	1911		Cody Tennant, 4th Baron Glenconner		Euan Tennant (first cousin)
Baron Aberconway	1911		Henry McLaren, 4th Baron Aberconway		Charles McLaren
Baron Merthyr	1911		David Trevor Lewis, 5th Baron Merthyr		Peter Lewis (uncle)
Baron Rowallan	1911		John Corbett, 4th Baron Rowallan		Jason Corbett
Baron Ashton of Hyde	1911 (Note: The Lord Ashton of Hyde ranks higher in precedence as the current Master of the Horse than as a baron.)		Henry Ashton, 4th Baron Ashton of Hyde		John Ashton (brother)
Baron Ravensdale	1911		Daniel Mosley, 4th Baron Ravensdale	Baron Ravensdale of Little Eaton (United Kingdom, life peerage, 2026)	Alexander Mosley
Baron Hollenden	1912		Ian Hope-Morley, 4th Baron Hollenden		Edward Hope-Morley
Baron Parmoor	1914		Henry Cripps, 6th Baron Parmoor		Frederick Cripps
Baron Cunliffe	1914		Roger Cunliffe, 3rd Baron Cunliffe		Henry Cunliffe
Baron Wrenbury	1915		William Buckley, 4th Baron Wrenbury		Arthur Buckley (second cousin)
Baron Faringdon	1916		Charles Henderson, 3rd Baron Faringdon		James Henderson
Baron Shaughnessy	1916		Charles Shaughnessy, 5th Baron Shaughnessy		David Shaughnessy (brother)
Baron Rathcreedan	1916		Christopher Norton, 3rd Baron Rathcreedan		Adam Norton (brother)
Baron Somerleyton	1916		Hugh Crossley, 4th Baron Somerleyton		John Crossley
Baron Carnock	1916		Adam Nicolson, 5th Baron Carnock		Thomas Nicolson
Baron Beaverbrook	1917		Maxwell Aitken, 3rd Baron Beaverbrook		Maxwell Aitken
Baron Gainford	1917		Adrian Pease, 5th Baron Gainford		Matthew Pease (brother)
Baron Forteviot	1917		Alexander Dewar, 5th Baron Forteviot		James Dewar
Baron Colwyn	1917		Craig Hamilton-Smith, 4th Baron Colwyn		Joshua Hamilton-Smith
Baron Gisborough	1917		Richard Chaloner, 3rd Baron Gisborough		Peregrine Chaloner
Baron Morris	1918		Thomas Morris, 4th Baron Morris		Milton Morris
Baron Cawley	1918		John Cawley, 4th Baron Cawley		William Cawley
Baron Terrington	1918		Christopher Woodhouse, 6th Baron Terrington		Jack Woodhouse
Baron Glenarthur	1918		Simon Arthur, 4th Baron Glenarthur		Edward Arthur
Baron Phillimore	1918		Tristan Phillimore, 6th Baron Phillimore		Milo Arthur Francis Phillimore
Baron Inverforth	1919		Andrew Weir, 4th Baron Inverforth		Benjamin Weir
Baron Sinha	1919		Arup Sinha, 6th Baron Sinha		Dilip Sinha (brother)
Baron Cochrane of Cults	1919		Thomas Cochrane, 5th Baron Cochrane of Cults		Michael Cochrane (brother)
Baron Clwyd	1919		John Roberts, 4th Baron Clwyd		John Roberts
Baron Russell of Liverpool	1919		Simon Russell, 3rd Baron Russell of Liverpool	Baron Russell of Kiloran (United Kingdom, life peerage, 2026)	Edward Russell
Baron Swinfen	1919		Charles Eady, 4th Baron Swinfen		None
Baron Meston	1919		James Meston, 3rd Baron Meston		Thomas Meston
Baron Cullen of Ashbourne	1920		Michael Cokayne, 4th Baron Cullen of Ashbourne		None
Baron Trevethin	1921		Patrick Lawrence, 5th Baron Trevethin, 3rd Baron Oaksey	Baron Oaksey (United Kingdom, 1947)	Oliver Lawrence
Baron Glendyne	1922		John Nivison, 4th Baron Glendyne		None
Baron Manton	1922		Miles Watson, 4th Baron Manton		Thomas Watson
Baron Forres	1922		George Williamson, 5th Baron Forres		Guthrie Williamson (brother)
Baron Vestey	1922		William Vestey, 4th Baron Vestey		Samuel Vestey
Baron Borwick	1922		James Borwick, 5th Baron Borwick		Edwin Borwick
Baron Maclay	1922		Joseph Maclay, 4th Baron Maclay		Thomas Maclay (brother)
Baron Bethell	1922		James Bethell, 5th Baron Bethell		Jacob Bethell
Baron Darling	1924		Robert Darling, 3rd Baron Darling		Robert Darling
Baron Banbury of Southam	1924		Charles Banbury, 3rd Baron Banbury of Southam		None
Baron Merrivale	1925		Derek Duke, 4th Baron Merrivale		Thomas Duke
Baron Bradbury	1926		John Bradbury, 4th Baron Bradbury		Benjamin Bradbury (brother)
Baron Greenway	1927		Ambrose Greenway, 4th Baron Greenway		Nicholas Greenway (nephew)
Baron Hayter	1927		William Chubb, 4th Baron Hayter		Thomas Chubb
Baron Cornwallis	1927		Fiennes Cornwallis, 4th Baron Cornwallis		Fiennes Cornwallis
Baron Daresbury	1927		Peter Greenall, 4th Baron Daresbury		Thomas Greenall
Baron Wraxall	1928		Antony Gibbs, 4th Baron Wraxall		Orlando Gibbs
Baron Remnant	1928		Philip Remnant, 4th Baron Remnant		Edward Remnant
Baron Moynihan	1929		Colin Moynihan, 4th Baron Moynihan	Baron Moynihan of Purbeck (United Kingdom, life peerage, 2026)	Nicholas Moynihan
Baron Craigmyle	1929		Thomas Shaw, 4th Baron Craigmyle		Alexander Shaw
Baron Dulverton	1929		Michael Hamilton Wills, 3rd Baron Dulverton		Robert Wills
Baron Luke	1929		Ian Lawson Johnston, 4th Baron Luke		Samuel Lawson Johnson
Baron Alvingham	1929		Robert Yerburgh, 3rd Baron Alvingham		Robert Yerburgh
Baron Baden-Powell	1929		David Baden-Powell, 5th Baron Baden-Powell		Max Baden-Powell
Baron Ponsonby of Shulbrede	1930		Frederick Ponsonby, 4th Baron Ponsonby of Shulbrede	Baron Ponsonby of Roehampton (United Kingdom, life peerage, 2000)	Cameron Ponsonby
Baron Dickinson	1930		Martin Dickinson, 3rd Baron Dickinson		Andrew Dickinson (brother)
Baron Noel-Buxton	1930		Charles Noel-Buxton, 4th Baron Noel-Buxton		Christopher Noel-Buxton (first cousin)
Baron Howard of Penrith	1930		Philip Howard, 3rd Baron Howard of Penrith		Thomas Howard
Baron Rochester	1931		David Lamb, 3rd Baron Rochester		Daniel Lamb
Baron Selsdon	1932		Callum Mitchell-Thomson, 4th Baron Selsdon		Alec Mitchell-Thomson
Baron Moyne	1932		Valentine Guinness, 4th Baron Moyne		Sebastian Guinness (half-brother)
Baron Davies	1932		David Davies, 4th Baron Davies		Benjamin Davies (brother)
Baron Rankeillour	1932		James Hope, 6th Baron Rankeillour		Charlie Hope
Baron Brocket	1933		Charles Nall-Cain, 3rd Baron Brocket		Alexander Nall-Cain
Baron Milne	1933		George Milne, 3rd Baron Milne		Iain Milne (brother)
Baron Rennell	1933		James Rodd, 4th Baron Rennell		None
Baron Mottistone	1933		Christopher Seely, 6th Baron Mottistone		Richard Seely (brother)
Baron Iliffe	1933		Robert Iliffe, 3rd Baron Iliffe		Edward Iliffe
Baron Palmer	1933		Hugo Palmer, 5th Baron Palmer		Ernest Palmer
Baron Rockley	1934		Anthony Cecil, 4th Baron Rockley		William Cecil
Baron Elton	1934		Edward Elton, 3rd Baron Elton		Charles Elton
Baron Wakehurst	1934		Jan Loder, 5th Baron Wakehurst		Nicholas Loder (brother)
Baron Hesketh	1935		Alexander Fermor-Hesketh, 3rd Baron Hesketh		Frederick Fermor-Hesketh
Baron Tweedsmuir	1935		John William de l'Aigle Buchan, 4th Baron Tweedsmuir		John Buchan
Baron Wigram	1935		Andrew Wigram, 3rd Baron Wigram		Harry Wigram
Baron Riverdale	1935		Anthony Balfour, 3rd Baron Riverdale		David Balfour (uncle)
Baron May	1935		Jasper May, 4th Baron May		None
Baron Kennet	1935		William Young, 3rd Baron Kennet		Archibald Young
Baron Strathcarron	1936		Ian Macpherson, 3rd Baron Strathcarron		Rory MacPherson
Baron Catto	1936		Innes Catto, 3rd Baron Catto		Alexander Catto (brother)
Baron Windlesham	1937		James Hennessy, 4th Baron Windlesham		George Hennessy
Baron Mancroft	1937		Benjamin Mancroft, 3rd Baron Mancroft		Arthur Mancroft
Baron McGowan	1937		Harry McGowan, 4th Baron McGowan		Dominic McGowan (brother)
Baron Denham	1937		Richard Bowyer, 3rd Baron Denham		Henry Bowyer (brother)
Baron Rea	1937		Matthew Rea, 4th Baron Rea		Daniel Rea (brother)
Baron Cadman	1937		John Cadman, 3rd Baron Cadman		Nicholas Cadman
Baron Kenilworth	1937		John Randle Siddeley, 4th Baron Kenilworth		William Siddeley
Baron Pender	1937		Harry Denison-Pender, 4th Baron Pender		Miles Denison-Pender
Baron Roborough	1938		Massey Lopes, 4th Baron Roborough	Baron Lopes (United Kingdom, life peerage, 2026)	Henry Lopes
Baron Brassey of Apethorpe	1938		Edward Brassey, 4th Baron Brassey of Apethorpe		Christian Brassey
Baron Stamp	1938		Nicholas Charles Trevor Stamp, 5th Baron Stamp		Leo Stamp
Baron Bicester	1938		Charles Smith, 5th Baron Bicester		Milo Louis Vivian Smith
Baron Milford	1939		Guy Philipps, 4th Baron Milford		Archie Philipps
Baron Hankey	1939		Donald Hankey, 3rd Baron Hankey		Alexander Hankey (brother)
Baron Harmsworth	1939		Thomas Harmsworth, 3rd Baron Harmsworth		Dominic Harmsworth
Baron Rotherwick	1939		Robin Cayzer, 3rd Baron Rotherwick		Herbert Cayzer
Baron Glentoran	1939		Robin Dixon, 3rd Baron Glentoran		Daniel Dixon
Baron Tryon	1940		Charles Tryon, 4th Baron Tryon		Guy Tryon
Baron Croft	1940		Bernard Page Croft, 3rd Baron Croft		None
Baron Teviot	1940		Charles Kerr, 3rd Baron Treviot		None
Baron Nathan	1940		Rupert Nathan, 3rd Baron Nathan		Alasdair Nathan
Baron Reith	1940		James Reith, 3rd Baron Reith		Harry Reith
Baron Kindersley	1941		Rupert Kindersley, 4th Baron Kindersley		Frederick Kindersley
Baron Ironside	1941		Charles Ironside, 3rd Baron Ironside		Frederick Ironside
Baron Latham	1942		Dominic Latham, 2nd Baron Latham		Anthony Latham (brother)
Baron Wedgwood	1942		Anthony John Wedgwood, 5th Baron Wedgwood		Josiah Wedgwood
Baron Geddes	1942		Euan Geddes, 3rd Baron Geddes		James Geddes
Baron Bruntisfield	1942		Michael Warrender, 3rd Baron Bruntisfield		John Warrender
Baron Brabazon of Tara	1942		Ivon Moore-Brabazon, 3rd Baron Brabazon of Tara		Benjamin Moore-Brabazon
Baron Keyes	1943		Charles Keyes, 3rd Baron Keyes		Leopold Keyes (brother)
Baron Hemingford	1943		Christopher Herbert, 4th Baron Hemingford		Frederick Herbert
Baron Moran	1943		James Wilson, 3rd Baron Moran		David Wilson
Baron Killearn	1943		Victor Lampson, 3rd Baron Killearn		Miles Lampson
Baron Dowding	1943		Piers Dowding, 3rd Baron Dowding		Mark Dowding (brother)
Baron Gretton	1944		John Gretton, 4th Baron Gretton		John Gretton
Baron Westwood	1944		Fergus Westwood, 4th Baron Westwood		Alistair Westwood (brother)
Baron Hazlerigg	1945		Arthur Grey Hazlerigg, 3rd Baron Hazlerigg		Arthur Hazlerigg
Baron Hacking	1945		David Hacking, 3rd Baron Hacking		Douglas Hacking
Baron Chetwode	1945		Philip Chetwode, 2nd Baron Chetwode		Roger Chetwode
Baron Sandford	1945		James Edmondson, 3rd Baron Sandford		Devon Edmondson
Baron Altrincham	1945		Sebastian Grigg, 4th Baron Altrincham	Baron Altrincham of Islington (United Kingdom, life peerage, 2026)	Edward Grigg
Baron Broadbridge	1945		Richard Broadbridge, 5th Baron Broadbridge		Mark Broadbridge
Baron Mountevans	1945		Jeffrey Evans, 4th Baron Mountevans		Alexander Evans
Baron Lindsay of Birker	1945		James Lindsay, 3rd Baron Lindsay of Birker		Simon Lindsay (first cousin once removed)
Baron Piercy	1945		James Piercy, 3rd Baron Piercy		Mark Piercy (brother)
Baron Chorley	1945		Nicholas Chorley, 3rd Baron Chorley		Patrick Chorley
Baron Calverley	1945		Charles Muff, 3rd Baron Calverley		Jonathan Muff
Baron Tedder	1946		Robin Tedder, 3rd Baron Tedder		Benjamin Tedder
Baron Colgrain	1946		Alastair Campbell, 4th Baron Colgrain		Thomas Campbell
Baron Darwen	1946		Paul Davies, 4th Baron Darwen		Oscar Davies
Baron Lucas of Chilworth	1946		Simon Lucas, 3rd Baron Lucas of Chilworth		John Lucas
Baron Shepherd	1946		Graeme Shepherd, 3rd Baron Shepherd		Patrick Shepherd
Baron Newall	1946		Francis Newall, 2nd Baron Newall		Richard Newall
Baron Rugby	1947		Robert Maffey, 3rd Baron Rugby		Timothy Maffey
Baron Layton	1947		Jonathan Layton, 4th Baron Layton		Jeremy Layton
Baron Simon of Wythenshawe	1947		Matilda Simon, 3rd Baroness Simon of Wythenshawe		Michael Simon (first cousin once removed)
Baron Kershaw	1947		John Kershaw, 5th Baron Kershaw		Edward Kershaw
Baron Trefgarne	1947		David Trefgarne, 2nd Baron Trefgarne		William Trefgarne
Baron Crook	1947		Robert Crook, 3rd Baron Crook		Matthew Crook
Baron Amwell	1947		Keith Montague, 3rd Baron Amwell		Ian Montague
Baron Milverton	1947		Michael Richards, 3rd Baron Milverton		Arthur Richards
Baron Clydesmuir	1948		David Colville, 3rd Baron Clydesmuir		Richard Colville
Baron Burden	1950		Andrew Burden, 3rd Baron Burden		Fraser Burden (brother)
Baron Haden-Guest	1950		Christopher Haden-Guest, 5th Baron Haden-Guest		Nicholas Haden-Guest (brother)
Baron Silkin	1950		Currently Disclaimed		Rory Silkin (first cousin)
Baron Hives	1950		Matthew Hives, 3rd Baron Hives		Henry Hives
Baron Ogmore	1950		Tudor Rees Rees-Williams, 4th Baron Ogmore		Dylan Rees-Williams (brother)
Baron Morris of Kenwood	1950		Jonathan Morris, 3rd Baron Morris of Kenwood		Benjamin Morris
Baron Macpherson of Drumochter	1951		James Macpherson, 3rd Baron Macpherson of Drumochter		Daniel Macpherson
Baron Kenswood	1951		Michael Whitfield, 3rd Baron Kenswood		Anthony John Whitfield (brother)
Baron Freyberg	1951		Valerian Freyberg, 3rd Baron Freyberg		Joseph Freyberg
Baron Milner of Leeds	1951		Richard Milner, 3rd Baron Milner of Leeds		None
Baron Kirkwood	1951		James Kirkwood, 4th Baron Kirkwood		Douglas Kirkwood (first cousin once removed)
Baron Wise	1951		Christopher Wise, 3rd Baron Wise		Thomas Wise
Baron Jeffreys	1952		Christopher Jeffreys, 3rd Baron Jeffreys		Arthur Jeffreys
Baron Rathcavan	1953		François O'Neill, 4th Baron Rathcavan		Tyrone Hugh Richard O'Neill
Baron Baillieu	1953		James Baillieu, 3rd Baron Baillieu		Robert Baillieu
Baron Grantchester	1953		Christopher Suenson-Taylor, 3rd Baron Grantchester	Baron Grantchester of Audlem (United Kingdom, life peerage, 2026)	Jesse Suenson-Taylor
Baron Coleraine	1954		James Law, 3rd Baron Coleraine		Andrew Law (uncle)
Baron Harvey of Tasburgh	1954		Charles Harvey, 3rd Baron Harvey of Tasburgh		John Harvey
Baron Gridley	1955		Richard Gridley, 3rd Baron Gridley		Carl Gridley
Baron Strathalmond	1955		William Fraser, 3rd Baron Strathalmond		William Fraser
Baron Strathclyde	1955		Thomas Galbraith, 2nd Baron Strathclyde	Baron Strathclyde of Barskimming (United Kingdom, life peerage, 2026)	Charles Galbraith (brother)
Baron Clitheroe	1955		Ralph Christopher Assheton, 3rd Baron Clitheroe		Ralph Assheton
Baron McNair	1955		Duncan McNair, 3rd Baron McNair		William McNair (brother)
Baron Colyton	1956		Alisdair Hopkinson, 2nd Baron Colyton		James Hopkinson
Baron Astor of Hever	1956		John Astor, 3rd Baron Astor of Hever		Charles Astor
Baron Sinclair of Cleeve	1957		John Sinclair, 3rd Baron Sinclair of Cleeve		None
Baron Bridges	1957		Mark Bridges, 3rd Baron Bridges		Nicholas Bridges (brother)
Baron Norrie	1957		George Norrie, 2nd Baron Norrie		Mark Norrie
Baron Birkett	1958		Thomas Birkett, 3rd Baron Birkett		None
Baron Harding of Petherton	1958		William Harding, 3rd Baron Harding of Petherton		Angus Harding
Baron Poole	1958		David Poole, 2nd Baron Poole		Oliver Poole
Baron Rootes	1959		Nicholas Rootes, 3rd Baron Rootes		William Rootes (first cousin)
Baron Netherthorpe	1959		James Turner, 3rd Baron Netherthorpe		Andrew Turner
Baron Crathorne	1959		James Dugdale, 2nd Baron Crathorne		Thomas Dugdale
Baron Spens	1959		Patrick Spens, 4th Baron Spens		Peter Spens
Baron MacAndrew	1959		Oliver Charles MacAndrew, 4th Baron MacAndrew		Archie MacAndrew
Baron Nelson of Stafford	1960		Alistair Nelson, 4th Baron Nelson of Stafford		James Nelson (uncle)
Baron Howick of Glendale	1960		Charles Baring, 2nd Baron Howick of Glendale		David Baring
Baron Sanderson of Ayot	1960		Michael Sanderson, 3rd Baron Sanderson of Ayot		Basil Sanderson (first cousin)
Baron Cobbold	1960		Henry Lytton Cobbold, 3rd Baron Cobbold		Edward Lytton Cobbold
Baron Robertson of Oakridge	1961		William Robertson, 3rd Baron Robertson of Oakridge		Daniel Benn Robertson
Baron Marks of Broughton	1961		Simon Marks, 3rd Baron Marks of Broughton		Michael Marks
Baron Fairhaven	1961		Ailwyn Broughton, 3rd Baron Fairhaven		James Broughton
Baron Leighton of St Mellons	1962		Richard Seager, 4th Baron Leighton of St Mellons		William Seager
Baron Brain	1962		Thomas Brain, 4th Baron Brain		None
Baron Aldington	1962		Charles Low, 2nd Baron Aldington		Philip Low
Baron Inchyra	1962		James Hoyer Millar, 3rd Baron Inchyra		Jake Millar
Baron Silsoe	1963		Simon Trustram Eve, 3rd Baron Silsoe		Richard Trustram Eve (first cousin)
Baron Thomson of Fleet	1964		David Thomson, 3rd Baron Thomson of Fleet		Benjamin Thomson
Baron Martonmere	1964		John Robinson, 2nd Baron Martonmere		James Robinson
Baron Sherfield	1964		Dwight Makins, 3rd Baron Sherfield		None
Baron Inglewood	1964		Richard Fletcher-Vane, 2nd Baron Inglewood		Henry Fletcher-Vane
Baron Glendevon	1964		Jonathan Hope, 3rd Baron Glendevon		None
Baron Grimston of Westbury	1964		Robert Grimston, 3rd Baron Grimston of Westbury		Gerald Grimston (brother)
Baron Renwick	1964		Robert Renwick, 3rd Baron Renwick		Michael Renwick (brother)
Baron St Helens	1964		Henry Hughes-Young, 3rd Baron St Helens		None
Baron Margadale	1965		Alastair Morrison, 3rd Baron Margadale		Declan Morrison

=== Life barons ===
All baronies created since 1965 have either been life peerages or subsidiary baronies for peerages of higher rank, which do not appear in this list.

Name and Title	Created	Arms	Notes
Simon Mackay, Baron Tanlaw	1971		Senior life peer; Left the House of Lords
Caroline Cox, Baroness Cox	1983		Senior life peer in the House of Lords
Nigel Vinson, Baron Vinson	1985		Left the House of Lords
Bernard Donoughue, Baron Donoughue	1985		
Gloria Hooper, Baroness Hooper	1985		
David Stevens, Baron Stevens of Ludgate	1987		
Tessa Blackstone, Baroness Blackstone	1987		
Derry Irvine, Baron Irvine of Lairg	1987		Lord Chancellor (1997–2003)
Ian McColl, Baron McColl of Dulwich	1989		
Diana Eccles, Baroness Eccles of Moulton	1990		The Baroness Eccles of Moulton ranks higher in precedence as Viscountess Eccles by marriage than as a baroness in her own right.
Hugh Cavendish, Baron Cavendish of Furness	1990		Left the House of Lords
Julia Cumberlege, Baroness Cumberlege	1990		Left the House of Lords
Malcolm Pearson, Baron Pearson of Rannoch	1990		
Lydia Dunn, Baroness Dunn	1990		Left the House of Lords
Jeffrey Sterling, Baron Sterling of Plaistow	1991		
Peter Palumbo, Baron Palumbo	1991		Left the House of Lords
Brian Griffiths, Baron Griffiths of Fforestfach	1991		
Joan Seccombe, Baroness Seccombe	1991		
Sally Hamwee, Baroness Hamwee	1991		
Jennifer Hilton, Baroness Hilton of Eggardon	1991		Left the House of Lords
Ann Mallalieu, Baroness Mallalieu	1991		
Clive Hollick, Baron Hollick	1991		
Pauline Perry, Baroness Perry of Southwark	1991		Left the House of Lords
David Craig, Baron Craig of Radley	1991		
Bill Rodgers, Baron Rodgers of Quarry Bank	1992		Left the House of Lords
David Wilson, Baron Wilson of Tillyorn	1992		Left the House of Lords
Lynda Chalker, Baroness Chalker of Wallasey	1992		Left the House of Lords
John Wakeham, Baron Wakeham	1992		Lord President of the Council (1988–1989), Lord Keeper of the Privy Seal (1987–1988, 1992–1994)
David Owen, Baron Owen	1992		Left the House of Lords
John Eatwell, Baron Eatwell	1992		
Raymond Plant, Baron Plant of Highfield	1992		Left the House of Lords
Margaret Jay, Baroness Jay of Paddington	1992		Lord Keeper of the Privy Seal (1998–2001)
Harry Woolf, Baron Woolf	1992		Lord Chief Justice of England and Wales (2000–2005), Master of the Rolls (1996–2000)
Simon Haskel, Baron Haskel	1993		
Joyce Gould, Baroness Gould of Potternewton	1993		Left the House of Lords
Robert Dixon-Smith, Baron Dixon-Smith	1993		Left the House of Lords
Christopher Tugendhat, Baron Tugendhat	1993		
David Nickson, Baron Nickson	1994		Left the House of Lords
Alf Dubs, Baron Dubs	1994		
Graham Tope, Baron Tope	1994		
Patricia Rawlings, Baroness Rawlings	1994		
Sarah Hogg, The Baroness Hogg	1995		The Baroness Hogg ranks higher in precedence as Viscountess Hailsham by marriage than as a baroness in her own right.
Elizabeth Smith, Baroness Smith of Gilmorehill	1995		Left the House of Lords
Lennie Hoffmann, Baron Hoffmann	1995		
David Hope, Baron Hope of Craighead	1995		Lord President of the Court of Session (1989–1996)
James Blyth, Baron Blyth of Rowington	1995		Left the House of Lords
Robin Eames, Baron Eames	1995		
Robert Winston, Baron Winston	1995		
William Wallace, Baron Wallace of Saltaire	1995		
Tom McNally, Baron McNally	1995		
Helene Hayman, Baroness Hayman	1996		
John Sewel, Baron Sewel	1996		Left the House of Lords
Philip Harris, Baron Harris of Peckham	1996		
Judith Wilcox, Baroness Wilcox	1996		Left the House of Lords
Peter Bowness, Baron Bowness	1996		
Martin Thomas, Baron Thomas of Gresford	1996		
David Currie, Baron Currie of Marylebone	1996		
Maurice Saatchi, Baron Saatchi	1996		
Elizabeth Symons, Baroness Symons of Vernham Dean	1996		
John Taylor, Baron Taylor of Warwick	1996		
John Alderdice, Baron Alderdice	1996		
Joyce Anelay, Baroness Anelay of St Johns	1996		
Hazel Byford, Baroness Byford	1996		Left the House of Lords
Peter Gummer, Baron Chadlington	1996		Left the House of Lords
Ian MacLaurin, Baron MacLaurin of Knebworth	1996		Left the House of Lords
Larry Whitty, Baron Whitty	1996		
Andrew Lloyd Webber, Baron Lloyd-Webber	1997		Left the House of Lords
Charlie Falconer, Baron Falconer of Thoroton	1997		Lord Chancellor (2003–2007)
David Simon, Baron Simon of Highbury	1997		Left the House of Lords
Andrew Hardie, Baron Hardie	1997		
Michael Jopling, Baron Jopling	1997		
David Howell, Baron Howell of Guildford	1997		
David Steel, Baron Steel of Aikwood	1997		Left the House of Lords
David Alton, Baron Alton of Liverpool	1997		
Douglas Hurd, Baron Hurd of Westwell	1997		Left the House of Lords
Kenneth Baker, Baron Baker of Dorking	1997		
John Patten, Baron Patten	1997		
Peter Levene, Baron Levene of Portsoken	1997		Left the House of Lords
Mark Saville, Baron Saville of Newdigate	1997		Left the House of Lords
Michael Levy, Baron Levy	1997		
Valerie Amos, Baroness Amos	1997		Lord President of the Council (2003–2007)
Richard Newby, Baron Newby	1997		
Ian Lang, Baron Lang of Monkton	1997		Left the House of Lords
Janet Fookes, Baroness Fookes	1997		
Sarah Ludford, Baroness Ludford	1997		
Norman Blackwell, Baron Blackwell	1997		
David Sainsbury, Baron Sainsbury of Turville	1997		Left the House of Lords
John Cope, Baron Cope of Berkeley	1997		Left the House of Lords
Jill Pitkeathley, Baroness Pitkeathley	1997		
Philip Hunt, Baron Hunt of Kings Heath	1997		
David Hunt, Baron Hunt of Wirral	1997		
Tim Razzall, Baron Razzall	1997		
Clive Brooke, Baron Brooke of Alverthorpe	1997		
Navnit Dholakia, Baron Dholakia	1997		
Helena Kennedy, Baroness Kennedy of The Shaws	1997		
David Puttnam, Baron Puttnam	1997		Left the House of Lords
Michael Morris, Baron Naseby	1997		
Andrew Stone, Baron Stone of Blackheath	1997		Left the House of Lords
Patricia Scotland, Baroness Scotland of Asthal	1997		
Steve Bassam, Baron Bassam of Brighton	1997		
Emma Nicholson, Baroness Nicholson of Winterbourne	1997		
Barbara Young, Baroness Young of Old Scone	1997		
George Simpson, Baron Simpson of Dunkeld	1997		Left the House of Lords
Mike Watson, Baron Watson of Invergowrie	1997		
Richard Ryder, Baron Ryder of Wensum	1997		Left the House of Lords
Robin Butler, Baron Butler of Brockwell	1998		
Timothy Clement-Jones, Baron Clement-Jones	1998		
Brian Mackenzie, Baron Mackenzie of Framwellgate	1998		
Waheed Alli, Baron Alli	1998		
Pola Uddin, Baroness Uddin	1998		
Terence Burns, Baron Burns	1998		
Mary Goudie, Baroness Goudie	1998		
Peta Buscombe, Baroness Buscombe	1998		
Glenys Thornton, Baroness Thornton	1998		
Norman Lamont, Baron Lamont of Lerwick	1998		
Christine Crawley, Baroness Crawley	1998		
Willy Bach, Baron Bach	1998		
David Evans, Baron Evans of Watford	1998		
Susan Miller, Baroness Miller of Chilthorne Domer	1998		
Tony Clarke, Baron Clarke of Hampstead	1998		
Norman Warner, Baron Warner	1998		Left the House of Lords
Philip Norton, Baron Norton of Louth	1998		
Margaret Sharp, Baroness Sharp of Guildford	1998		Left the House of Lords
Nazir Ahmed, Baron Ahmed	1998		Left the House of Lords
Kathleen Richardson, Baroness Richardson of Calow	1998		Left the House of Lords
Melvyn Bragg, Baron Bragg	1998		Left the House of Lords
Toby Harris, Baron Harris of Haringey	1998		
Gus Macdonald, Baron Macdonald of Tradeston	1998		Left the House of Lords
Nick Phillips, Baron Phillips of Worth Matravers	1999		President of the Supreme Court (2009–2012), Lord Chief Justice of England and Wales (2005–2008), Master of the Rolls (2000–2005)
Onora O'Neill, Baroness O'Neill of Bengarve	1999		
Narendra Patel, Baron Patel	1999		
Diana Warwick, Baroness Warwick of Undercliffe	1999		
Vivien Stern, Baroness Stern	1999		Left the House of Lords
Dennis Stevenson, Baron Stevenson of Coddenham	1999		Left the House of Lords
Richard Faulkner, Baron Faulkner of Worcester	1999		
Michael Forsyth, Baron Forsyth of Drumlean	1999		The Lord Forsyth of Drumlean ranks higher in precedence as the current Lord Speaker than as a baron.
Usha Prashar, Baroness Prashar	1999		
Dennis Rogan, Baron Rogan	1999		
Norman Foster, Baron Foster of Thames Bank	1999		Left the House of Lords
David Lea, Baron Lea of Crondall	1999		Left the House of Lords
Chris Rennard, Baron Rennard	1999		
William Bradshaw, Baron Bradshaw	1999		
Graham Kirkham, Baron Kirkham	1999		
Alan Watson, Baron Watson of Richmond	1999		Left the House of Lords
Anthony Grabiner, Baron Grabiner	1999		
Alex Carlile, Baron Carlile of Berriew	1999		
Ronald Oxburgh, Baron Oxburgh	1999		Left the House of Lords
William Waldegrave, Baron Waldegrave of North Hill	1999		
Geoffrey Filkin, Baron Filkin	1999		
Peter Goldsmith, Baron Goldsmith	1999		
Elizabeth Barker, Baroness Barker	1999		
Catherine Ashton, Baroness Ashton of Upholland	1999		Lord President of the Council (2007–2008)
Colin Sharman, Baron Sharman	1999		Left the House of Lords
Genista McIntosh, Baroness McIntosh of Hudnall	1999		
Kenneth Woolmer, Baron Woolmer of Leeds	1999		Left the House of Lords
Anita Gale, Baroness Gale	1999		
Hector MacKenzie, Baron MacKenzie of Culkein	1999		Left the House of Lords
Janet Whitaker, Baroness Whitaker	1999		
Angela Harris, Baroness Harris of Richmond	1999		
George Robertson, Baron Robertson of Port Ellen	1999		
John Birt, Baron Birt	2000		
Charles Powell, Baron Powell of Bayswater	2000		
Lindsay Northover, Baroness Northover	2000		
Matthew Oakeshott, Baron Oakeshott of Seagrove Bay	2000		
Angela Billingham, Baroness Billingham	2000		
Daniel Brennan, Baron Brennan	2000		
Janet Neel Cohen, Baroness Cohen of Pimlico	2000		Left the House of Lords
Richard Layard, Baron Layard	2000		
Leslie Turnberg, Baron Turnberg	2000		Left the House of Lords
Kay Andrews, Baroness Andrews	2000		
Parry Mitchell, Baron Mitchell	2000		
Bhikhu Parekh, Baron Parekh	2000		
Rosalind Scott, Baroness Scott of Needham Market	2000		
Joan Walmsley, Baroness Walmsley	2000		Also Lady Thomas of Gresford since 1996.
Sebastian Coe, Baron Coe	2000		Left the House of Lords
Bill Jordan, Baron Jordan	2000		
Robin Hodgson, Baron Hodgson of Astley Abbotts	2000		Left the House of Lords
Sheila Noakes, Baroness Noakes	2000		
Kenneth O. Morgan, Baron Morgan	2000		
Richard Scott, Baron Scott of Foscote	2000		Left the House of Lords
Richard Luce, Baron Luce	2000		Lord Chamberlain of the Household (2000–2006); Left the House of Lords
Michael Ashcroft, Baron Ashcroft	2000		Left the House of Lords
Richard Best, Baron Best	2001		
Jeff Rooker, Baron Rooker	2001		
Susan Greenfield, Baroness Greenfield	2001		
David Hannay, Baron Hannay of Chiswick	2001		
Sally Morgan, Baroness Morgan of Huyton	2001		
Paul Condon, Baron Condon	2001		Left the House of Lords
John Browne, Baron Browne of Madingley	2001		
Ilora Finlay, Baroness Finlay of Llandaff	2001		
Victor Adebowale, Baron Adebowale	2001		
David Clark, Baron Clark of Windermere	2001		
Bruce Grocott, Baron Grocott	2001		
Norman Fowler, Baron Fowler	2001		Lord Speaker (2016–2021)
Dale Campbell-Savours, Baron Campbell-Savours	2001		
John MacGregor, Baron MacGregor of Pulham Market	2001		Lord President of the Council (1990–1992); Left the House of Lords
Barry Jones, Baron Jones	2001		
Tom King, Baron King of Bridgwater	2001		
Michael Heseltine, Baron Heseltine	2001		
Llin Golding, Baroness Golding	2001		
John Taylor, Baron Kilclooney	2001		
Ken Maginnis, Baron Maginnis of Drumglass	2001		
Conrad Moffat Black, Baron Black of Crossharbour	2001		Left the House of Lords
George Carey, Baron Carey of Clifton	2002		The Lord Carey of Clifton ranks higher in precedence as retired Archbishop of Canterbury than as a baron.
Richard Wilson, Baron Wilson of Dinton	2002		Left the House of Lords
William Cullen, Baron Cullen of Whitekirk	2003		Lord President of the Court of Session (2002–2005), Lord Justice Clerk (1997–2001); Left the House of Lords
Brenda Hale, Baroness Hale of Richmond	2004		President of the Supreme Court (2017–2020)
Paul Drayson, Baron Drayson	2004		
Kishwer Falkner, Baroness Falkner of Margravine	2004		
Denis Tunnicliffe, Baron Tunnicliffe	2004		
Greville Howard, Baron Howard of Rising	2004		
Patrick Carter, Baron Carter of Coles	2004		
Patricia Morris, Baroness Morris of Bolton	2004		
Peter Truscott, Baron Truscott	2004		
Margaret Prosser, Baroness Prosser	2004		
Delyth Morgan, Baroness Morgan of Drefelin	2004		
Irvine Laidlaw, Baron Laidlaw	2004		Left the House of Lords
Julia Neuberger, Baroness Neuberger	2004		
Roger Roberts, Baron Roberts of Llandudno	2004		
Anthony Giddens, Baron Giddens	2004		
Diljit Rana, Baron Rana	2004		Left the House of Lords
Elaine Murphy, Baroness Murphy	2004		
Hugh Dykes, Baron Dykes	2004		Left the House of Lords
Alec Broers, Baron Broers	2004		Left the House of Lords
Lola Young, Baroness Young of Hornsey	2004		
Iain Vallance, Baron Vallance of Tummel	2004		Left the House of Lords
Jane Bonham Carter, Baroness Bonham-Carter of Yarnbury	2004		
Anthony Young, Baron Young of Norwood Green	2004		
Janet Royall, Baroness Royall of Blaisdon	2004		Lord President of the Council (2008–2009)
Ted Rowlands, Baron Rowlands	2004		
Ewen Cameron, Baron Cameron of Dillington	2004		
Leslie Griffiths, Baron Griffiths of Burry Port	2004		
John Kerr, Baron Kerr of Kinlochard	2004		
Frances D'Souza, Baroness D'Souza	2004		Lord Speaker (2011–2016)
Chris Patten, Baron Patten of Barnes	2005		
Neil Kinnock, Baron Kinnock	2005		
David Hope, Baron Hope of Thornes	2005		The Lord Hope of Thornes ranks higher in precedence as retired Archbishop of York than as a baron.; Left the House of Lords
John Stevens, Baron Stevens of Kirkwhelpington	2005		
Andrew Adonis, Baron Adonis	2005		
Archy Kirkwood, Baron Kirkwood of Kirkhope	2005		Left the House of Lords
Ann Taylor, Baroness Taylor of Bolton	2005		Lord President of the Council (1997–1998)
Estelle Morris, Baroness Morris of Yardley	2005		
Paul Tyler, Baron Tyler	2005		Left the House of Lords
George Foulkes, Baron Foulkes of Cumnock	2005		
Archie Hamilton, Baron Hamilton of Epsom	2005		
Gillian Shephard, Baroness Shephard of Northwold	2005		
Lynda Clark, Baroness Clark of Calton	2005		
Lewis Moonie, Baron Moonie	2005		Left the House of Lords
Chris Smith, Baron Smith of Finsbury	2005		
Jenny Tonge, Baroness Tonge	2005		Left the House of Lords
Virginia Bottomley, Baroness Bottomley of Nettlestone	2005		
Jack Cunningham, Baron Cunningham of Felling	2005		
Donald Anderson, Baron Anderson of Swansea	2005		
Irene Adams, Baroness Adams of Craigielea	2005		
Clive Soley, Baron Soley	2005		Left the House of Lords
Jean Corston, Baroness Corston	2005		Left the House of Lords
Alastair Goodlad, Baron Goodlad	2005		Left the House of Lords
Martin Rees, Baron Rees of Ludlow	2005		
Adair Turner, Baron Turner of Ecchinswell	2005		
Jonathan Mance, Baron Mance	2005		
Ruth Deech, Baroness Deech	2005		
Jo Valentine, Baroness Valentine	2005		
Andrew Turnbull, Baron Turnbull	2005		
Michael Hastings, Baron Hastings of Scarisbrick	2005		
Neil Davidson, Baron Davidson of Glen Clova	2006		
Nigel Crisp, Baron Crisp	2006		
John Lee, Baron Lee of Trafford	2006		
Celia Thomas, Baroness Thomas of Winchester	2006		
Joyce Quin, Baroness Quin	2006		Left the House of Lords
John Taylor, Baron Taylor of Holbeach	2006		
John Burnett, Baron Burnett	2006		
Denise Kingsmill, Baroness Kingsmill	2006		
Robin Teverson, Baron Teverson	2006		
Sandip Verma, Baroness Verma	2006		
Maggie Jones, Baroness Jones of Whitchurch	2006		
Margaret Ford, Baroness Ford	2006		Left the House of Lords
Maurice Morrow, Baron Morrow	2006		
Bill Morris, Baron Morris of Handsworth	2006		Left the House of Lords
Jonathan Marland, Baron Marland	2006		
Kamlesh Patel, Baron Patel of Bradford	2006		
David James, Baron James of Blackheath	2006		
Keith Bradley, Baron Bradley	2006		
Wallace Browne, Baron Browne of Belmont	2006		
Elizabeth Butler-Sloss, Baroness Butler-Sloss	2006		
Colin Low, Baron Low of Dalston	2006		
Eileen Paisley, Baroness Paisley of St George's	2006		Also Lady Bannside since 2010.; Left the House of Lords
Colin Boyd, Baron Boyd of Duncansby	2006		
Geoffrey Dear, Baron Dear	2006		
Karan Bilimoria, Baron Bilimoria	2006		
Molly Meacher, Baroness Meacher	2006		Also Lady Layard since 2000.; Left the House of Lords
Michael Jay, Baron Jay of Ewelme	2006		
Michael Walker, Baron Walker of Aldringham	2006		
David Neuberger, Baron Neuberger of Abbotsbury	2007		President of the Supreme Court (2012–2017), Master of the Rolls (2009–2012)
Jean Coussins, Baroness Coussins	2007		
Paul Bew, Baron Bew	2007		
Khalid Hameed, Baron Hameed	2007		
John Krebs, Baron Krebs	2007		
Andrew Mawson, Baron Mawson	2007		
Jane Campbell, Baroness Campbell of Surbiton	2007		
Mark Malloch Brown, Baron Malloch-Brown	2007		
Alan West, Baron West of Spithead	2007		
Digby Jones, Baron Jones of Birmingham	2007		Left the House of Lords
Shriti Vadera, Baroness Vadera	2007		
Ara Darzi, Baron Darzi of Denham	2007		
Robin Janvrin, Baron Janvrin	2007		
Sayeeda Warsi, Baroness Warsi	2007		
Pauline Neville-Jones, Baroness Neville-Jones	2007		
Susan Garden, Baroness Garden of Frognal	2007		Also Lady Garden since 2004.
Nicholas Stern, Baron Stern of Brentford	2007		
John Mogg, Baron Mogg	2008		Left the House of Lords
Robert Smith, Baron Smith of Kelvin	2008		
Eliza Manningham-Buller, Baroness Manningham-Buller	2008		
Michael Bates, Baron Bates	2008		
Peter Mandelson, Baron Mandelson	2008		Lord President of the Council (2009–2010); Left the House of Lords
Stephen Carter, Baron Carter of Barnes	2008		Left the House of Lords
David Pannick, Baron Pannick	2008		
Sue Campbell, Baroness Campbell of Loughborough	2008		
Mervyn Davies, Baron Davies of Abersoch	2009		
Lawrence Collins, Baron Collins of Mapesbury	2009		
David Freud, Baron Freud	2009		
Alan Sugar, Baron Sugar	2009		
Nuala O'Loan, Baroness O'Loan	2009		
Tony Hall, Baron Hall of Birkenhead	2010		
Ajay Kakkar, Baron Kakkar	2010		
Tanni Grey-Thompson, Baroness Grey-Thompson	2010		
Michael Bichard, Baron Bichard	2010		
Jonathan Hill, Baron Hill of Oareford	2010		
Nat Wei, Baron Wei	2010		
James Sassoon, Baron Sassoon	2010		
Maeve Sherlock, Baroness Sherlock	2010		
John McFall, Baron McFall of Alcluith	2010		Lord Speaker (2021–2026)
Simon Wolfson, Baron Wolfson of Aspley Guise	2010		
Phil Willis, Baron Willis of Knaresborough	2010		
Hilary Armstrong, Baroness Armstrong of Hill Top	2010		
Roger Liddle, Baron Liddle	2010		
Jeannie Drake, Baroness Drake	2010		
Margaret Wheeler, Baroness Wheeler	2010		
John Gummer, Baron Deben	2010		
Roy Kennedy, Baron Kennedy of Southwark	2010		
Dianne Hayter, Baroness Hayter of Kentish Town	2010		
Jim Knight, Baron Knight of Weymouth	2010		
John Gardiner, Baron Gardiner of Kimble	2010		
Mike German, Baron German	2010		
Meral Hussein-Ece, Baroness Hussein-Ece	2010		
Floella Benjamin, Baroness Benjamin	2010		
Rita Donaghy, Baroness Donaghy	2010		
John Hutton, Baron Hutton of Furness	2010		
Paul Boateng, Baron Boateng	2010		
Jack McConnell, Baron McConnell of Glenscorrodale	2010		First Minister of Scotland (2001–2007)
Don Touhig, Baron Touhig	2010		
Angela Smith, Baroness Smith of Basildon	2010		The Baroness Smith of Basildon ranks higher in precedence as the current Lord Privy Seal than as a baroness.
Helen Liddell, Baroness Liddell of Coatdyke	2010		
Guy Black, Baron Black of Brentwood	2010		
Angela Browning, Baroness Browning	2010		
Michael Wills, Baron Wills	2010		
Dolar Amarshi Popat, Baron Popat	2010		
Deborah Stedman-Scott, Baroness Stedman-Scott	2010		
Ken Macdonald, Baron Macdonald of River Glaven	2010		
Wilf Stevenson, Baron Stevenson of Balmacara	2010		
Michael Howard, Baron Howard of Lympne	2010		
John Shipley, Baron Shipley	2010		Left the House of Lords
Kate Parminter, Baroness Parminter	2010		
Beverley Hughes, Baroness Hughes of Stretford	2010		
Matthew Taylor, Baron Taylor of Goss Moor	2010		
John Reid, Baron Reid of Cardowan	2010		Lord President of the Council (2003)
Susan Nye, Baroness Nye	2010		
Anna Healy, Baroness Healy of Primrose Hill	2010		
Edward Faulks, Baron Faulks	2010		
Margaret Eaton, Baroness Eaton	2010		
Richard Allan, Baron Allan of Hallam	2010		
Des Browne, Baron Browne of Ladyton	2010		Left the House of Lords
John Monks, Baron Monks	2010		
Peter Hennessy, Baron Hennessy of Nympsfield	2010		
Sheila Hollins, Baroness Hollins	2010		
Stephen Green, Baron Green of Hurstpierpoint	2010		
Robert Balchin, Baron Lingfield	2010		
Andrew Feldman, Baron Feldman of Elstree	2010		
Michael Dobbs, Baron Dobbs	2010		
John Sharkey, Baron Sharkey	2010		
Bernard Ribeiro, Baron Ribeiro	2010		Left the House of Lords
Fiona Shackleton, Baroness Shackleton of Belgravia	2010		
Dee Doocey, Baroness Doocey	2010		
Susan Kramer, Baroness Kramer	2010		
Patience Wheatcroft, Baroness Wheatcroft	2010		
Nicholas True, Baron True	2010		Lord Keeper of the Privy Seal (2022–2024)
Alistair Cooke, Baron Lexden	2010		
Judith Jolly, Baroness Jolly	2010		Left the House of Lords
Richard Spring, Baron Risby	2010		
Tina Stowell, Baroness Stowell of Beeston	2011		Lord Keeper of the Privy Seal (2014–2016)
Paul Strasburger, Baron Strasburger	2011		
Jonathan Marks, Baron Marks of Henley-on-Thames	2011		
Gordon Wasserman, Baron Wasserman	2011		
Julian Fellowes, Baron Fellowes of West Stafford	2011		Left the House of Lords
Raj Loomba, Baron Loomba	2011		
Tariq Ahmad, Baron Ahmad of Wimbledon	2011		
Robert Edmiston, Baron Edmiston	2011		Left the House of Lords
Michael Lord, Baron Framlingham	2011		
Stewart Wood, Baron Wood of Anfield	2011		
Reg Empey, Baron Empey	2011		
Monroe Palmer, Baron Palmer of Childs Hill	2011		
Ben Stoneham, Baron Stoneham of Droxford	2011		
Stanley Fink, Baron Fink	2011		
Elizabeth Berridge, Baroness Berridge	2011		
Richard Dannatt, Baron Dannatt	2011		
Dafydd Wigley, Baron Wigley	2011		
Ray Collins, Baron Collins of Highbury	2011		
Qurban Hussain, Baron Hussain	2011		
Joan Bakewell, Baroness Bakewell	2011		
Jonathan Kestenbaum, Baron Kestenbaum	2011		
Eluned Morgan, Baroness Morgan of Ely	2011		First Minister of Wales (2024–present)
George Magan, Baron Magan of Castletown	2011		
Michael Grade, Baron Grade of Yarmouth	2011		
Anne Jenkin, Baroness Jenkin of Kennington	2011		
Oona King, Baroness King of Bow	2011		Left the House of Lords
Claire Tyler, Baroness Tyler of Enfield	2011		
Graham Stirrup, Baron Stirrup	2011		
Ruth Lister, Baroness Lister of Burtersett	2011		
Bryony Worthington, Baroness Worthington	2011		
David Gold, Baron Gold	2011		
Michael Bishop, Baron Glendonbrook	2011		Left the House of Lords
Mike Storey, Baron Storey	2011		
Nicol Stephen, Baron Stephen	2011		
Maurice Glasman, Baron Glasman	2011		
Sal Brinton, Baroness Brinton	2011		
David Maclean, Baron Blencathra	2011		
Indarjit Singh, Baron Singh of Wimbledon	2011		
Donald Curry, Baron Curry of Kirkharle	2011		
Gus O'Donnell, Baron O'Donnell	2012		
Beeban Kidron, Baroness Kidron	2012		
Alexander Trees, Baron Trees	2012		
Paul Deighton, Baron Deighton	2012		
Rowan Williams, Baron Williams of Oystermouth	2013		The Lord Williams of Oystermouth ranks higher in precedence as retired Archbishop of Canterbury than as a baron.; Left the House of Lords
John Nash, Baron Nash	2013		
Martha Lane Fox, Baroness Lane-Fox of Soho	2013		
Michael Berkeley, Baron Berkeley of Knighton	2013		
Ian Livingston, Baron Livingston of Parkhead	2013		
Mervyn King, Baron King of Lothbury	2013		
Rosalind Grender, Baroness Grender	2013		
Ian Wrigglesworth, Baron Wrigglesworth	2013		
Jonathan Mendelsohn, Baron Mendelsohn	2013		
Zahida Manzoor, Baroness Manzoor	2013		
Doreen Lawrence, Baroness Lawrence of Clarendon	2013		
Nick Bourne, Baron Bourne of Aberystwyth	2013		
Catherine Bakewell, Baroness Bakewell of Hardington Mandeville	2013		
Mike Whitby, Baron Whitby	2013		
Lucy Neville-Rolfe, Baroness Neville-Rolfe	2013		
Daniel Finkelstein, Baron Finkelstein	2013		
Matthew Carrington, Baron Carrington of Fulham	2013		
Stephen Sherbourne, Baron Sherbourne of Didsbury	2013		
Brian Paddick, Baron Paddick	2013		
Jeremy Purvis, Baron Purvis of Tweed	2013		
Howard Leigh, Baron Leigh of Hurley	2013		
Fiona Hodgson, Baroness Hodgson of Abinger	2013		Also Lady Hodgson of Astley Abbotts since 2000.
Rumi Verjee, Baron Verjee	2013		
Alison Suttie, Baroness Suttie	2013		
Christine Humphreys, Baroness Humphreys	2013		
William Haughey, Baron Haughey	2013		
Alicia Kennedy, Baroness Kennedy of Cradley	2013		Also Lady Kennedy of Southwark since 2010.
Richard Balfe, Baron Balfe	2013		
Susan Williams, Baroness Williams of Trafford	2013		
Jenny Jones, Baroness Jones of Moulsecoomb	2013		
James Palumbo, Baron Palumbo of Southwark	2013		Left the House of Lords
Charles Allen, Baron Allen of Kensington	2013		
Annabel Goldie, Baroness Goldie	2013		
Anthony Bamford, Baron Bamford	2013		Left the House of Lords
John Thomas, Baron Thomas of Cwmgiedd	2013		Lord Chief Justice of England and Wales (2013–2017)
David Richards, Baron Richards of Herstmonceux	2014		
Michael Farmer, Baron Farmer	2014		
Christopher Fox, Baron Fox	2014		
Ranbir Singh Suri, Baron Suri	2014		Left the House of Lords
Julie Smith, Baroness Smith of Newnham	2014		
Natalie Evans, Baroness Evans of Bowes Park	2014		Lord Keeper of the Privy Seal (2016–2022)
David Goddard, Baron Goddard of Stockport	2014		
Dido Harding, Baroness Harding of Winscombe	2014		
Carlyn Chisholm, Baroness Chisholm of Owlpen	2014		
Joanna Shields, Baroness Shields	2014		
Stuart Rose, Baron Rose of Monewden	2014		
Andrew Cooper, Baron Cooper of Windrush	2014		
Arminka Helic, Baroness Helic	2014		
Gail Rebuck, Baroness Rebuck	2014		Also Lady Gould of Brookwood since 2004.
Nosheena Mobarik, Baroness Mobarik	2014		
Paul Scriven, Baron Scriven	2014		
Christopher Lennie, Baron Lennie	2014		
Karren Brady, Baroness Brady	2014		
Michael Cashman, Baron Cashman	2014		
Kath Pinnock, Baroness Pinnock	2014		
Martin Callanan, Baron Callanan	2014		
Barbara Janke, Baroness Janke	2014		
Andrew Green, Baron Green of Deddington	2014		
Alison Wolf, Baroness Wolf of Dulwich	2014		
Jonathan Evans, Baron Evans of Weardale	2014		
Robert Rogers, Baron Lisvane	2014		
Willie Hay, Baron Hay of Ballyore	2014		
Ros Altmann, Baroness Altmann	2015		
Andrew Dunlop, Baron Dunlop	2015		Left the House of Lords
Francis Maude, Baron Maude of Horsham	2015		
Jim O'Neill, Baron O'Neill of Gatley	2015		
George Bridges, Baron Bridges of Headley	2015		
David Prior, Baron Prior of Brampton	2015		
Richard Keen, Baron Keen of Elie	2015		
David Blunkett, Baron Blunkett	2015		
Robert Hayward, Baron Hayward	2015		
George Young, Baron Young of Cookham	2015		Lord Keeper of the Privy Seal (2010–2012)
Philip Smith, Baron Smith of Hindhead	2015		
Stephen Gilbert, Baron Gilbert of Panteg	2015		
Michelle Mone, Baroness Mone	2015		
James Arbuthnot, Baron Arbuthnot of Edrom	2015		
James O'Shaughnessy, Baron O'Shaughnessy	2015		
Philippa Stroud, Baroness Stroud	2015		
Stuart Polak, Baron Polak	2015		
Shas Sheehan, Baroness Sheehan	2015		
Andrew Lansley, Baron Lansley	2015		Lord Keeper of the Privy Seal (2012–2014)
Jonny Oates, Baron Oates	2015		
James Lupton, Baron Lupton	2015		
Anne McIntosh, Baroness McIntosh of Pickering	2015		
Liz Redfern, Baroness Redfern	2015		
Don Foster, Baron Foster of Bath	2015		
Emma Pidding, Baroness Pidding	2015		
Jane Scott, Baroness Scott of Bybrook	2015		
William Hague, Baron Hague of Richmond	2015		
Lorely Burt, Baroness Burt of Solihull	2015		
Greg Barker, Baron Barker of Battle	2015		
Andrew Robathan, Baron Robathan	2015		
Kevin Shinkwin, Baron Shinkwin	2015		
Simone Finn, Baroness Finn	2015		
Kate Rock, Baroness Rock	2015		
Gary Porter, Baron Porter of Spalding	2015		
Ruby McGregor-Smith, Baroness McGregor-Smith	2015		
David Willetts, Baron Willetts	2015		
Malcolm Bruce, Baron Bruce of Bennachie	2015		
Alan Beith, Baron Beith	2015		
Paul Murphy, Baron Murphy of Torfaen	2015		
Lynne Featherstone, Baroness Featherstone	2015		
Dorothy Thornhill, Baroness Thornhill	2015		
Spencer Livermore, Baron Livermore	2015		
Peter Hain, Baron Hain	2015		Lord Keeper of the Privy Seal (2003–2005)
Catherine Fall, Baroness Fall	2015		
Sharon Bowles, Baroness Bowles of Berkhamsted	2015		
David Watts, Baron Watts	2015		
Dawn Primarolo, Baroness Primarolo	2015		
Robert Mair, Baron Mair	2015		
John Bird, Baron Bird	2015		
Julia King, Baroness Brown of Cambridge	2015		
Mary Watkins, Baroness Watkins of Tavistock	2015		
Mark Price, Baron Price	2016		
Liz Sugg, Baroness Sugg	2016		
Charlotte Vere, Baroness Vere of Norbiton	2016		
Jitesh Gadhia, Baron Gadhia	2016		
Mark McInnes, Baron McInnes of Kilwinning	2016		
Timothy Kirkhope, Baron Kirkhope of Harrogate	2016		
Jonathan Caine, Baron Caine	2016		
Gabrielle Bertin, Baroness Bertin	2016		
Olivia Bloomfield, Baroness Bloomfield of Hinton Waldrist	2016		
Shami Chakrabarti, Baroness Chakrabarti	2016		
Camilla Cavendish, Baroness Cavendish of Little Venice	2016		
Nick Macpherson, Baron Macpherson of Earl's Court	2016		
Peter Ricketts, Baron Ricketts	2016		
Edward Llewellyn, Baron Llewellyn of Steep	2016		
Laura Wyld, Baroness Wyld	2017		
Ian Duncan, Baron Duncan of Springbank	2017		
Rona Fairhead, Baroness Fairhead	2017		
Theodore Agnew, Baron Agnew of Oulton	2017		
Ian Burnett, Baron Burnett of Maldon	2017		Lord Chief Justice of England and Wales (2017–2023)
Christopher Geidt, Baron Geidt	2017		
Richard Chartres, Baron Chartres	2017		The Lord Chartres ranks higher in precedence as retired Bishop of London than as a baron.
Bernard Hogan-Howe, Baron Hogan-Howe	2017		
Nick Houghton, Baron Houghton of Richmond	2017		
Andrew Tyrie, Baron Tyrie	2018		
Eric Pickles, Baron Pickles	2018		
Peter Lilley, Baron Lilley	2018		
William McCrea, Baron McCrea of Magherafelt and Cookstown	2018		
Catherine Meyer, Baroness Meyer	2018		
Amanda Sater, Baroness Sater	2018		
Pauline Bryan, Baroness Bryan of Partick	2018		Left the House of Lords
Iain McNicol, Baron McNicol of West Kilbride	2018		
Diana Barran, Baroness Barran	2018		
Edward Garnier, Baron Garnier	2018		
John Randall, Baron Randall of Uxbridge	2018		
Rosie Boycott, Baroness Boycott	2018		
David Anderson, Baron Anderson of Ipswich	2018		
Deborah Bull, Baroness Bull	2018		
Martha Osamor, Baroness Osamor	2018		
Nicola Blackwood, Baroness Blackwood of North Oxford	2019		
Natalie Bennett, Baroness Bennett of Manor Castle	2019		
Gavin Barwell, Baron Barwell	2019		
Stephen Parkinson, Baron Parkinson of Whitley Bay	2019		
Elizabeth Sanderson, Baroness Sanderson of Welton	2019		
Zameer Choudrey, Baron Choudrey	2019		
David Brownlow, Baron Brownlow of Shurlock Row	2019		
Byron Davies, Baron Davies of Gower	2019		
Joanna Penn, Baroness Penn	2019		
Rami Ranger, Baron Ranger	2019		
Heather Hallett, Baroness Hallett	2019		
Debbie Wilcox, Baroness Wilcox of Newport	2019		
Simon Woolley, Baron Woolley of Woodford	2019		
John Hendy, Baron Hendy	2019		
Christine Blower, Baroness Blower	2019		
Margaret Ritchie, Baroness Ritchie of Downpatrick	2019		
Ruth Hunt, Baroness Hunt of Bethnal Green	2019		
John Mann, Baron Mann	2019		
Harold Carter, Baron Carter of Haslemere	2019		
Kim Darroch, Baron Darroch of Kew	2019		
Nicky Morgan, Baroness Morgan of Cotes	2020		
Zac Goldsmith, Baron Goldsmith of Richmond Park	2020		
Robert Reed, Baron Reed of Allermuir	2020		The Lord Reed of Allermuir ranks higher in precedence as the current President of the Supreme Court than as a baron.
Gerry Grimstone, Baron Grimstone of Boscobel	2020		
Stephen Greenhalgh, Baron Greenhalgh	2020		
David Frost, Baron Frost	2020		
Nick Herbert, Baron Herbert of South Downs	2020		
Ed Vaizey, Baron Vaizey of Didcot	2020		
James Wharton, Baron Wharton of Yarm	2020		
Ian Austin, Baron Austin of Dudley	2020		
Helena Morrissey, Baroness Morrissey	2020		
Katy Clark, Baroness Clark of Kilwinning	2020		
John Woodcock, Baron Walney	2020		
Kenneth Clarke, Baron Clarke of Nottingham	2020		Lord Chancellor (2010–2012)
Gisela Stuart, Baroness Stuart of Edgbaston	2020		
Lorraine Fullbrook, Baroness Fullbrook	2020		
Aamer Sarfraz, Baron Sarfraz	2020		
Patrick McLoughlin, Baron McLoughlin	2020		
Sue Hayman, Baroness Hayman of Ullock	2020		Lord Speaker (2006–2011)
Daniel Moylan, Baron Moylan	2020		
Ian Botham, Baron Botham	2020		
Prem Sikka, Baron Sikka	2020		
Mark Sedwill, Baron Sedwill	2020		
Claire Fox, Baroness Fox of Buckley	2020		
Kate Hoey, Baroness Hoey	2020		
Veronica Wadley, Baroness Fleet	2020		
Andrew Sharpe, Baron Sharpe of Epsom	2020		
Mark Lancaster, Baron Lancaster of Kimbolton	2020		
Neil Mendoza, Baron Mendoza	2020		
Charles Moore, Baron Moore of Etchingham	2020		
Michael Spencer, Baron Spencer of Alresford	2020		
Bryn Davies, Baron Davies of Brixton	2020		
Nigel Dodds, Baron Dodds of Duncairn	2020		
Minouche Shafik, Baroness Shafik	2020		
Philip Hammond, Baron Hammond of Runnymede	2020		
Jo Johnson, Baron Johnson of Marylebone	2020		
Louise Casey, Baroness Casey of Blackstock	2020		
Tony Woodley, Baron Woodley	2020		
Henry Bellingham, Baron Bellingham	2020		
Edward Lister, Baron Udny-Lister	2020		
Keith Stewart, Baron Stewart of Dirleton	2020		
Evgeny Lebedev, Baron Lebedev	2020		
David Wolfson, Baron Wolfson of Tredegar	2020		
Daniel Hannan, Baron Hannan of Kingsclere	2021		
Dean Godson, Baron Godson	2021		
Richard Benyon, Baron Benyon	2021		The Lord Benyon ranks higher in precedence as the current Lord Chamberlain of the Household than as a baron.
Stephanie Fraser, Baroness Fraser of Craigmaddie	2021		
Simon McDonald, Baron McDonald of Salford	2021		
Peter Cruddas, Baron Cruddas	2021		
Syed Kamall, Baron Kamall	2021		
Gillian Merron, Baroness Merron	2021		
Andrew Parker, Baron Parker of Minsmere	2021		Lord Chamberlain of the Household (2021–2024)
Jacqueline Foster, Baroness Foster of Oxton	2021		
Judith Blake, Baroness Blake of Leeds	2021		
Jenny Chapman, Baroness Chapman of Darlington	2021		
Vernon Coaker, Baron Coaker	2021		
Wajid Khan, Baron Khan of Burnley	2021		
Amyas Morse, Baron Morse	2021		
Sue Black, Baroness Black of Strome	2021		
John Sentamu, Baron Sentamu	2021		The Lord Sentamu ranks higher in precedence as retired Archbishop of York than as a baron.
Simon Stevens, Baron Stevens of Birmingham	2021		
Ruth Davidson, Baroness Davidson of Lundin Links	2021		
Malcolm Offord, Baron Offord of Garvel	2021		Left the House of Lords
Richard Harrington, Baron Harrington of Watford	2022		
Christopher Bellamy, Baron Bellamy	2022		
Shaista Gohir, Baroness Gohir	2022		
Katherine Willis, Baroness Willis of Summertown	2022		
Nick Markham, Baron Markham	2022		
Dominic Johnson, Baron Johnson of Lainston	2022		
Simon Murray, Baron Murray of Blidworth	2022		
Nicholas Soames, Baron Soames of Fletching	2022		
Sharon Taylor, Baroness Taylor of Stevenage	2022		
Sonny Leong, Baron Leong	2022		
Ruth Lea, Baroness Lea of Lymm	2022		
Andrew Roberts, Baron Roberts of Belgravia	2022		
Hugo Swire, Baron Swire	2022		
Guglielmo Verdirame, Baron Verdirame	2022		
Kuldip Singh Sahota, Baron Sahota	2022		
Michael Hintze, Baron Hintze	2022		
Sheila Lawlor, Baroness Lawlor	2022		
Teresa O'Neill, Baroness O'Neill of Bexley	2022		
Fiona Twycross, Baroness Twycross	2022		
Angie Bray, Baroness Bray of Coln	2022		
Dambisa Moyo, Baroness Moyo	2022		
Graham Evans, Baron Evans of Rainow	2022		
Arlene Foster, Baroness Foster of Aghadrumsee	2022		First Minister of Northern Ireland (2016–2017, 2020–2021)
Peter Weir, Baron Weir of Ballyholme	2022		
Stewart Jackson, Baron Jackson of Peterborough	2022		
Peter Hendy, Baron Hendy of Richmond Hill	2022		
Kate Lampard, Baroness Lampard	2022		
Ruth Smeeth, Baroness Anderson of Stoke-on-Trent	2022		
Dave Prentis, Baron Prentis of Leeds	2022		
Stuart Peach, Baron Peach	2022		
Tom Watson, Baron Watson of Wyre Forest	2022		
Frances O'Grady, Baroness O'Grady of Upper Holloway	2022		
Tony Sewell, Baron Sewell of Sanderstead	2022		
Edward Young, Baron Young of Old Windsor	2023		
Darren Mott, Baron Mott	2023		
Benjamin Gascoigne, Baron Gascoigne	2023		
Shaun Bailey, Baron Bailey of Paddington	2023		
Ross Kempsell, Baron Kempsell	2023		
Kulveer Ranger, Baron Ranger of Northwood	2023		
Charlotte Owen, Baroness Owen of Alderley Edge	2023		
Ben Houchen, Baron Houchen of High Leven	2023		
Dan Rosenfield, Baron Rosenfield	2023		
Sue Carr, Baroness Carr of Walton-on-the-Hill	2023		The Baroness Carr of Walton-on-the-Hill ranks higher in precedence as the current Lady Chief Justice of England and Wales than as a baroness.
David Cameron, Baron Cameron of Chipping Norton	2023		Prime Minister (2010–2016)
Robbie Douglas-Miller, Baron Douglas-Miller	2023		
Jon Moynihan, Baron Moynihan of Chelsea	2024		
Matthew Elliott, Baron Elliott of Mickle Fell	2024		
Ruth Porter, Baroness Porter of Fulwood	2024		
Donald Cameron, Baron Cameron of Lochiel	2024		
Charles Banner, Baron Banner	2024		
Gerald Shamash, Baron Shamash	2024		
Franck Petitgas, Baron Petitgas	2024		
Peter Booth, Baron Booth	2024		
John Fuller, Baron Fuller	2024		
Stuart Marks, Baron Marks of Hale	2024		
Paul Goodman, Baron Goodman of Wycombe	2024		
James Jamieson, Baron Jamieson	2024		
Rosa Monckton, Baroness Monckton of Dallington Forest	2024		
John Hannett, Baron Hannett of Everton	2024		
Carmen Smith, Baroness Smith of Llanfaes	2024		
Jane Ramsey, Baroness Ramsey of Wall Heath	2024		
Ayesha Hazarika, Baroness Hazarika	2024		
Alexandra Freeman, Baroness Freeman of Steventon	2024		
Lionel Tarassenko, Baron Tarassenko	2024		
Patrick Vallance, Baron Vallance of Balham	2024		
Jacqui Smith, Baroness Smith of Malvern	2024		
James Timpson, Baron Timpson	2024		
Richard Hermer, Baron Hermer	2024		
David Hanson, Baron Hanson of Flint	2024		
Caroline Pidgeon, Baroness Pidgeon	2024		
John Spellar, Baron Spellar	2024		
Rosie Winterton, Baroness Winterton of Doncaster	2024		
Barbara Keeley, Baroness Keeley	2024		
Margaret Hodge, Baroness Hodge of Barking	2024		
Margaret Beckett, Baroness Beckett	2024		Lord President of the Council (1998–2001)
Kevan Jones, Baron Beamish	2024		
John Cryer, Baron Cryer	2024		
Minette Batters, Baroness Batters	2024		
Tom Elliott, Baron Elliott of Ballinamallard	2024		
Harriet Harman, Baroness Harman	2024		Lord Keeper of the Privy Seal (2007–2010)
Graham Brady, Baron Brady of Altrincham	2024		
Alok Sharma, Baron Sharma	2024		
Chris Grayling, Baron Grayling	2024		Lord Chancellor (2012–2015), Lord President of the Council (2015–2016)
Liam Booth-Smith, Baron Booth-Smith	2024		
Theresa May, Baroness May of Maidenhead	2024		Prime Minister (2016–2019)
Eleanor Laing, Baroness Laing of Elderslie	2024		
Hilary Cass, Baroness Cass	2024		
Craig Mackinlay, Baron Mackinlay of Richborough	2024		
Catherine Smith, Baroness Smith of Cluny	2024		
Poppy Gustafsson, Baroness Gustafsson	2024		
Margaret Curran, Baroness Curran	2025		
Claude Moraes, Baron Moraes	2025		
Theresa Griffin, Baroness Griffin of Princethorpe	2025		
Phil Wilson, Baron Wilson of Sedgefield	2025		
Thérèse Coffey, Baroness Coffey	2025		
David Evans, Baron Evans of Sealand	2025		
Brendan Barber, Baron Barber of Ainsdale	2025		
Russell Rook, Baron Rook	2025		
Toby Young, Baron Young of Acton	2025		
Nigel Biggar, Baron Biggar	2025		
Alison Levitt, Baroness Levitt	2025		Also Lady Carlile of Berriew since 1999.
Gerard Lemos, Baron Lemos	2025		
Lyn Brown, Baroness Brown of Silvertown	2025		
Carwyn Jones, Baron Jones of Penybont	2025		First Minister of Wales (2009–2018)
Kevin Brennan, Baron Brennan of Canton	2025		
Simon Pitkeathley, Baron Pitkeathley of Camden Town	2025		
Mary Bousted, Baroness Bousted	2025		
Julie Elliott, Baroness Elliott of Whitburn Bay	2025		
Mike Katz, Baron Katz	2025		
Joanne Cash, Baroness Cash	2025		
Krish Raval, Baron Raval	2025		
Mark Pack, Baron Pack	2025		
Kay Carberry, Baroness Carberry of Muswell Hill	2025		
Dinah Caine, Baroness Caine of Kentish Town	2025		
Anne Longfield, Baroness Longfield	2025		
Wendy Nichols, Baroness Nichols of Selby	2025		
Wendy Alexander, Baroness Alexander of Cleveden	2025		
Deborah Mattinson, Baroness Mattinson	2025		
Sue Gray, Baroness Gray of Tottenham	2025		
Marvin Rees, Baron Rees of Easton	2025		
Anji Hunter, Baroness Hunter of Auchenreoch	2025		
Rachel Maclean, Baroness Maclean of Redditch	2025		
Luciana Berger, Baroness Berger	2025		
Roger Evans, Baron Evans of Guisborough	2025		
Steve McCabe, Baron McCabe	2025		
Thangam Debbonaire, Baroness Debbonaire	2025		
Anne Marie Rafferty, Baroness Rafferty	2025		
Shaffaq Mohammed, Baron Mohammed of Tinsley	2025		
Amanda Spielman, Baroness Spielman	2025		
Alister Jack, Baron Jack of Courance	2025		
Mark Harper, Baron Harper	2025		
Stephen Massey, Baron Massey of Hampstead	2025		
Victoria Prentis, Baroness Prentis of Banbury	2025		
Michael Gove, Baron Gove	2025		Lord Chancellor (2015–2016)
Eleanor Shawcross, Baroness Shawcross-Wolfson	2025		Also Lady Wolfson of Aspley Guise since 2010.
Simon Hart, Baron Hart of Tenby	2025		
Sharon White, Baroness White of Tufnell Park	2025		
Simon Case, Baron Case	2025		
Tim Barrow, Baron Barrow	2025		
Jason Stockwood, Baron Stockwood	2025		
Liz Lloyd, Baroness Lloyd of Effra	2025		
Alan Whitehead, Baron Whitehead	2025		
Clare Gerada, Baroness Gerada	2025		
Polly Neate, Baroness Neate	2025		
Peter John, Baron John of Southwark	2026		
Brenda Dacres, Baroness Dacres of Lewisham	2026		
Matthew Doyle, Baron Doyle	2026		
Len Duvall, Baron Duvall	2026		
Shama Tatler, Baroness Shah	2026		
Nick Forbes, Baron Forbes of Newcastle	2026		
Joe Docherty, Baron Docherty of Milngavie	2026		
Sara Hyde, Baroness Hyde of Bemerton	2026		
Andy Roe, Baron Roe of West Wickham	2026		
Tracey Paul, Baroness Paul of Shepherd's Bush	2026		
Carol Linforth, Baroness Linforth	2026		
Neena Gill, Baroness Gill	2026		
Sharron Davies, Baroness Davies of Davenport	2026		
David Pitt-Watson, Baron Pitt-Watson	2026		
Peter Babudu, Baron Babudu	2026		
Catherine MacLeod, Baroness MacLeod of Camusdarach	2026		
Farmida Bi, Baroness Bi	2026		
David Isaac, Baron Isaac	2026		
Richard Walker, Baron Walker of Broxton	2026		
Katie Martin, Baroness Martin of Brockley	2026		
Geeta Nargund, Baroness Nargund	2026		
Michael Barber, Baron Barber of Chittlehampton	2026		
Sarah Teather, Baroness Teather	2026		
Simon Heffer, Baron Blackwater	2026		
Sophy Antrobus, Baroness Antrobus	2026		
Mike Dixon, Baron Dixon of Jericho	2026		
Rhiannon Leaman, Baroness Leaman	2026		
Uday Nagaraju, Baron Nagaraju	2026		
Russell Hobby, Baron Hobby	2026		
John Redwood, Baron Redwood	2026		
Ann Limb, Baroness Limb	2026		
Katherine Grainger, Baroness Grainger	2026		
Christina McAnea, Baroness McAnea	2026		
Tim J. Smith, Baron Smith of Ranmoor	2026		
Parvais Jabbar, Baron Jabbar	2026		
Alison Lowe, Baroness Lowe of Armley	2026		
Ken Macintosh, Baron Macintosh of Eastwood	2026		
Swaran Singh, Baron Singh of Solihull	2026		
Nick Stace, Baron Stace	2026		
Sadiq Khan, Baron Khan of Tooting	2026		
June Sarpong, Baroness Sarpong	2026		
Roberto Neri, Baron Neri	2026		
Ruth Mackenzie, Baroness Mackenzie of Sherwood	2026		
Anas Sarwar, Baron Sarwar	2026		
David Ross, Baron Ross of Nevill Holt	2026		
Brian Leveson, Baron Leveson of Liverpool	2026		
Marcus Davey, Baron Davey of Chalk Farm	2026		
Martin McTague, Baron McTague	2026		
Chris Wormald, Baron Wormald	2026		
Tim Leunig, Baron Leunig	2026		
Mark Petterson, Baron Petterson	2026		
Barbara Mills, Baroness Mills of Greenwich	2026		
Alison Garnham, Baroness Garnham	2026		
Julia Aglionby, Baroness Aglionby	2026		
Hannah Kitching, Baroness Kitching of Penistone	2026		
Cathy Ashley, Baroness Ashley of Lambeth	2026		
Kitty Ussher, Baroness Ussher	2026		
Dave McCobb, Baron McCobb	2026		
Patrick Sanders, Baron Sanders of Hallingdal	2026		
Saul Lehrfreund, Baron Lehrfreund	2026		

== See also ==
- British nobility
- List of baronies in the peerages of Britain and Ireland
