= Michael Katz =

Michael Katz may refer to:

- Michael Katz (journalist) (1939–2025), American sportswriter
- Michael Katz (politician) (born 1962), American politician and Delaware state senator
- Michael Katz (producer) (born 1954), Austrian film producer
- Michael B. Katz (1939–2014), American historian, author of Class, Bureaucracy, and Schools: The Illusion of Educational Change in America, Social Science Research Council
- Michael J. Katz, American screenwriter, best known for Remembering Phil
- Michael R. Katz, translator of Russian literature (Antonina and others)
- Mike Katz (born 1944), American bodybuilder
- Mike Katz (politician), British politician
