= 2024 political peerages =

Nominations for life peers in the UK

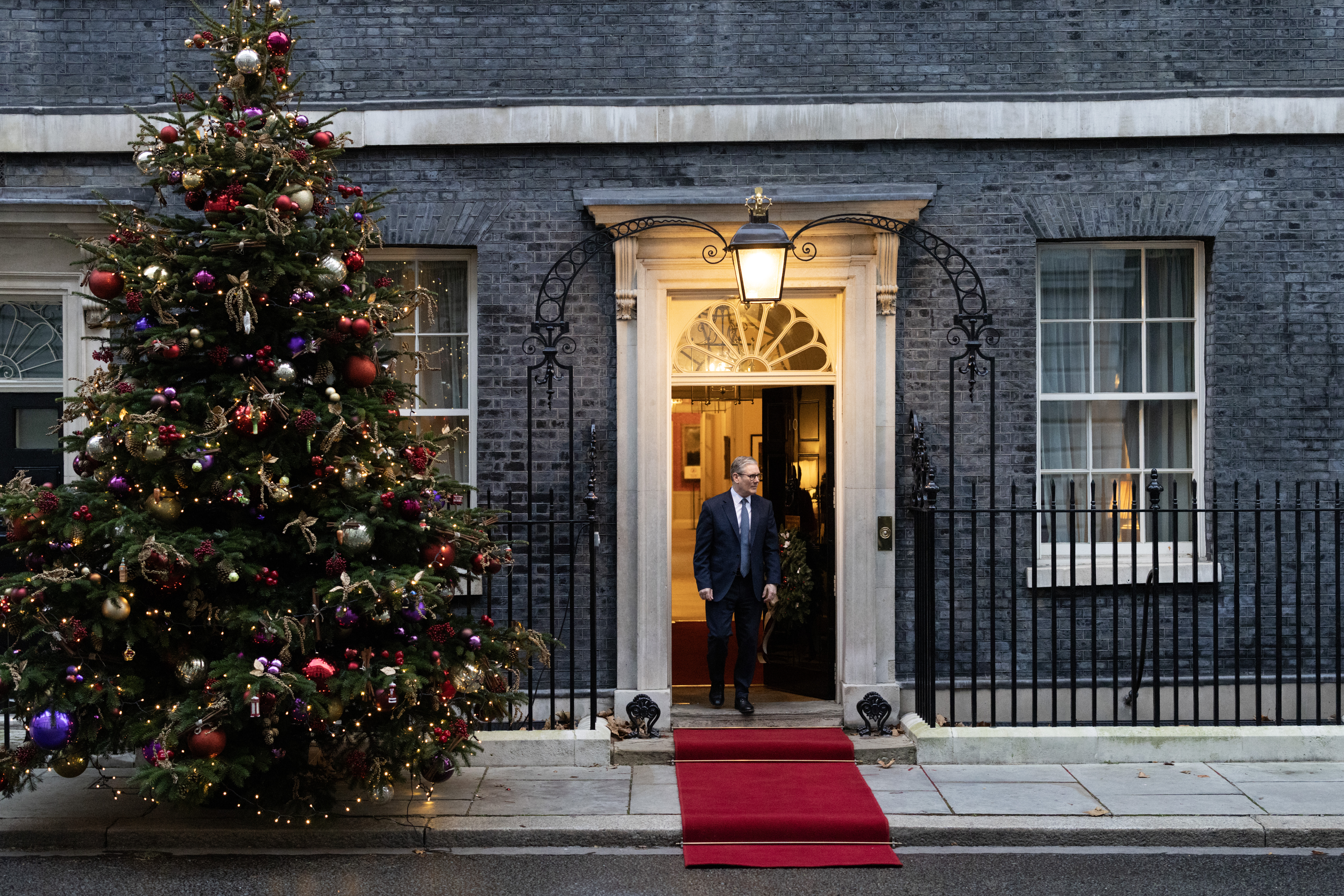
Sir Keir Starmer in December 2024

A list of nominations for life peerages was announced by the Prime Minister's Office on 20 December 2024.

== Life peerages ==
=== Labour ===
- Prof. Wendy Alexander, FRSE – Vice Chair of the British Council, former Member of the Scottish Parliament for Paisley North and previously Labour Leader in the Scottish Parliament; to be Baroness Alexander of Cleveden, of Cleveden in the City of Glasgow – 3 February 2025
- Sir Brendan Barber – former General Secretary of the Trades Union Congress and former chair of the Advisory, Conciliation and Arbitration Service; to be Baron Barber of Ainsdale, of Southport in the Metropolitan Borough of Sefton – 20 January 2025
- Luciana Berger – former Member of Parliament for Liverpool Wavertree and current Chair of the Maternal Mental Health Alliance; to be Baroness Berger, of Barnhill in the London Borough of Brent – 6 February 2025
- Mary Bousted – formerly the Joint General Secretary of the National Education Union (NEU), and education policy adviser; to be Baroness Bousted, of Bleasdale in the County of Lancashire – 27 January 2025
- Kevin Brennan – former Member of Parliament for Cardiff West and former Minister of State at the Department for Business, Innovation and Skills and Parliamentary Under Secretary of State at the Department for Children, Schools and Families; to be Baron Brennan of Canton, of Canton in the City of Cardiff – 24 January 2025
- Lyn Brown – former Member of Parliament for West Ham and former Shadow Minister; to be Baroness Brown of Silvertown, of West Ham in the London Borough of Newham – 23 January 2025
- Dinah Caine, CBE – Chair of Camden STEAM, formerly Chair of Goldsmiths University and CEO and Chair of Creative Skillset; to be Baroness Caine of Kentish Town, of Kentish Town in the London Borough of Camden – 30 January 2025
- Kay Carberry, CBE – former Assistant General Secretary of the British Trades Union Congress (TUC); to be Baroness Carberry of Muswell Hill, of Muswell Hill in the London Borough of Haringey – 30 January 2025
- Margaret Patricia Curran – former Member of Parliament for Glasgow East and formerly Minister within the Scottish Executive; to be Baroness Curran, of Townhead in the City of Glasgow – 15 January 2025
- Thangam Debbonaire – former Member of Parliament for Bristol West and former Shadow Secretary of State; to be Baroness Debbonaire, of De Beauvoir Town in the London Borough of Hackney – 7 February 2025
- Julie Elliott – former Member of Parliament for Sunderland Central and former Shadow Minister; to be Baroness Elliott of Whitburn Bay, of Whitburn Bay in the City of Sunderland – 27 January 2025
- David Evans – former Labour Party Regional Director, Assistant General Secretary and General Secretary of the Labour Party 2020–2024; to be Baron Evans of Sealand, of Chester in the County of Cheshire – 17 January 2025
- Sue Gray, CBE – former Chief of Staff to Prime Minister and former Cabinet Office Second Permanent Secretary; to be Baroness Gray of Tottenham, of Tottenham in the London Borough of Haringey – 4 February 2025
- Theresa Griffin – former Member of the European Parliament (MEP) for North West England; to be Baroness Griffin of Princethorpe, of Princethorpe in the County of Warwickshire – 16 January 2025
- Anji Hunter – Senior Advisor at Edelman, and former Head of Government Relations in Downing Street; to be Baroness Hunter of Auchenreoch, of Edzell in the County of Angus – 5 February 2025
- Rt Hon. Carwyn Jones – former Member of the Senedd (MS) for Bridgend and First Minister of Wales; to be Baron Jones of Penybont, of Penybont in the County of Pen-y-bont ar Ogwr – 23 January 2025
- Mike Katz – National Chair of Jewish Labour Movement and a former Camden Councillor; to be Baron Katz, of Fortune Green in the London Borough of Camden – 28 January 2025
- Gerard Lemos, CMG CBE – Social Policy expert and Chair of English Heritage, Chair of National Savings & Investments (NS&I), and Chair of London Institute of Banking and Finance; to be Baron Lemos, of Thornton Heath in the London Borough of Croydon – 22 January 2025
- Her Honour Judge Alison Levitt, KC – Master of the Bench of the Inner Temple. Previously Principal Legal Advisor to the Director of Public Prosecutions and a Circuit Judge specialising in serious crime, including rape; to be Baroness Levitt, of Beachamwell Warren in the County of Norfolk – 22 January 2025
- Anne Longfield, CBE – Campaigner for children and formerly served as the Children's Commissioner for England. Founder and Executive Chair of the Centre for Young Lives; to be Baroness Longfield, of Lower Wharfedale in the County of Yorkshire – 31 January 2025
- Deborah Mattinson – former Director of Strategy to Sir Keir Starmer. Co-founder of BritainThinks; to be Baroness Mattinson, of Darlington in the County of Durham – 3 February 2025
- Steve McCabe – former Member of Parliament for Birmingham Hall Green and Birmingham Selly Oak, and former Government Whip; to be Baron McCabe, of Selly Oak in the City of Birmingham and of Broadfield in the County of Renfrewshire – 7 February 2025
- Claude Ajit Moraes, OBE – former Member of the European Parliament (MEP) for London and chair of the Civil Liberties, Justice and Home Affairs Committee; to be Baron Moraes, of Hawkhill in the City of Dundee – 15 January 2025
- Wendy Nichols – UNISON Yorkshire and Humberside Regional Convenor and Branch Secretary and Labour Councillor; to be Baroness Nichols of Selby, of Selby in the County of North Yorkshire – 31 January 2025
- Hon. Simon Pitkeathley – Currently the Chief Executive of Camden Town Unlimited and Euston Town, formerly the Mayor of London's 'Champion for Small Business'; to be Baron Pitkeathley of Camden Town, of Tufnell Park in the London Borough of Islington – 24 January 2025
- Prof. Dame Anne Marie Rafferty, DBE FRCN – Professor of nursing policy and former President of the Royal College of Nursing; to be Baroness Rafferty, of Kirkcaldy in the County of Fife– 10 February 2025
- Krish Raval, OBE – Founding Director of Faith in Leadership; to be Baron Raval, of Hertsmere in the County of Hertfordshire – 29 January 2025
- Marvin Rees, OBE – former Mayor of Bristol and Head of Bristol City Council. Former journalist, voluntary sector manager and NHS public health manager; to be Baron Rees of Easton, of Saint Pauls in the City of Bristol – 4 February 2025
- Revd Dr Russell David Rook, OBE – Partner at the Good Faith Partnership and Anglican priest; to be Baron Rook, of Wimbledon in the London Borough of Merton – 20 January 2025
- Phil Wilson – former Member of Parliament for Sedgefield, and former Opposition Assistant Whip; to be Baron Wilson of Sedgefield, of Trimdon in the County of Durham – 16 January 2025

=== Conservative ===
- Prof. Nigel Biggar, CBE – Regius Professor Emeritus of Moral Theology at the University of Oxford and Anglican priest; to be Baron Biggar, of Castle Douglas in the Stewartry of Kirkcudbright – 21 January 2025
- Joanne Cash – Co-founder of Parent Gym and barrister serving as the Southeastern Circuit Junior and a member of the Bar Human Rights Committee; to be Baroness Cash, of Banbridge in the County of Down – 28 January 2025
- Rt Hon. Dame Thérèse Coffey, DBE – former Deputy Prime Minister and former Member of Parliament for Suffolk Coastal; to be Baroness Coffey, of Saxmundham in the County of Suffolk and of Grassendale in the City of Liverpool – 17 January 2025
- Roger Evans – former Deputy Mayor of London and former member of the London Assembly for Havering and Redbridge; to be Baron Evans of Guisborough, of Guisborough in the County of North Yorkshire – 6 February 2025
- Rachel Maclean – former Member of Parliament for Redditch and former Minister of State for Housing and Planning; to be Baroness Maclean of Redditch, of Hanbury in the County of Worcestershire – 5 February 2025
- Hon. Toby Young – founder and director of the Free Speech Union, and an associate editor of The Spectator; to be Baron Young of Acton, of Acton in the London Borough of Ealing – 21 January 2025

=== Liberal Democrats ===
- Cllr Shaffaq Mohammed, MBE – current Sheffield City Councillor and former chair of the Liberal Democrat Carers Commission; to be Baron Mohammed of Tinsley, of Sheffield in the County of South Yorkshire – 21 February 2025
- Dr Mark Pack – current President of the Liberal Democrats; to be Baron Pack, of Crouch Hill in the London Borough of Islington – 29 January 2025
