= Dinah Caine, Baroness Caine of Kentish Town =

British creative industries expert

The Right Honourable The Baroness Caine of Kentish Town CBE
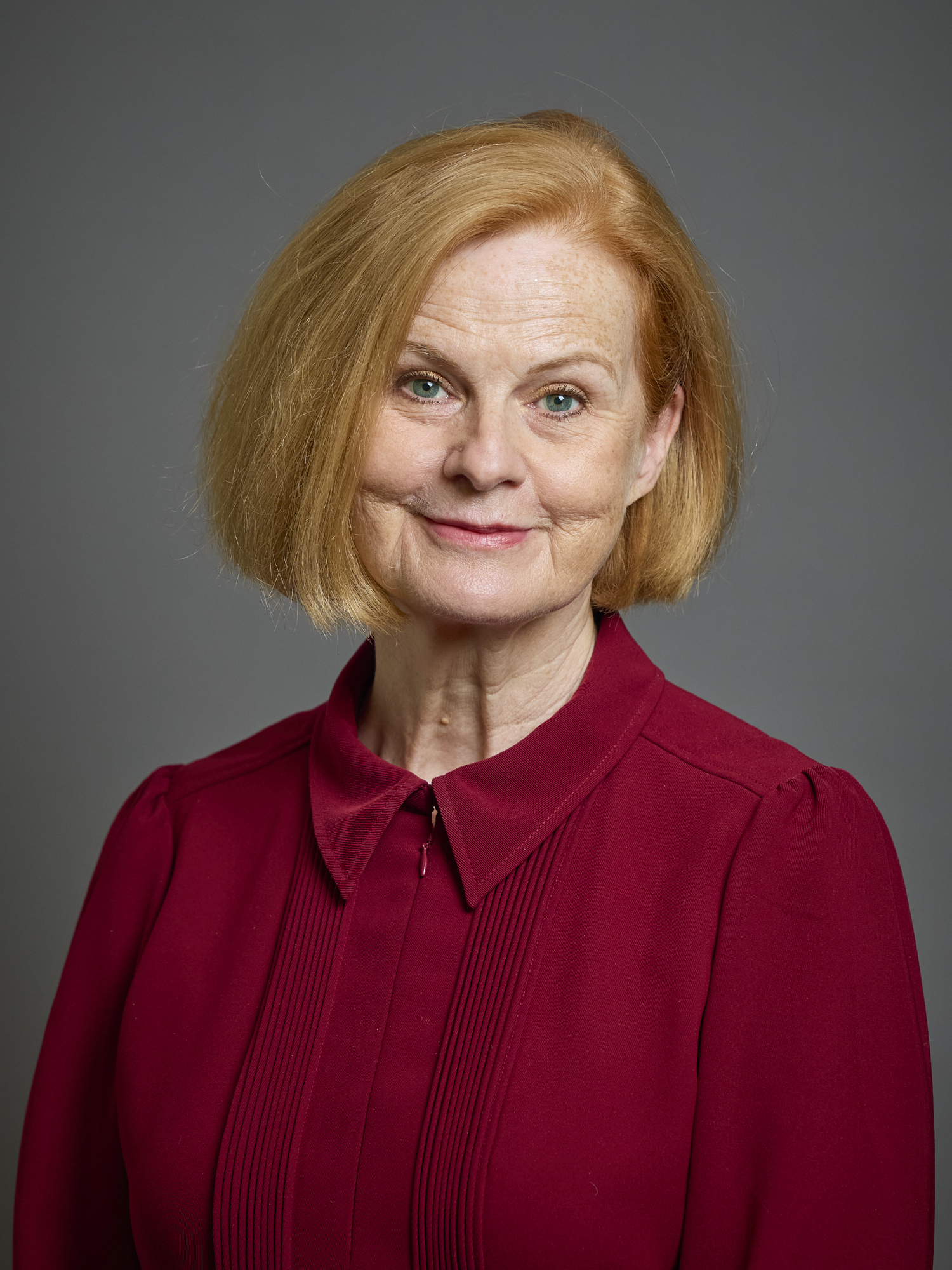
- Official portrait, 2025

Member of the House of Lords
- Lord Temporal
- Life peerage 30 January 2025

Personal details
- Party: Labour

Dinah Elizabeth Caine, Baroness Caine of Kentish Town, CBE, is a British creative industries expert and life peer.

== Career ==
Caine is the Chair of Camden STEAM, and was formerly Chair of Goldsmiths University and CEO and Chair of Creative Skillset.

== Honours ==
Caine was appointed an Officer of the Order of the British Empire (OBE) in the 2002 Birthday Honours for services to the Media industries, and promoted to Commander of the Order of the British Empire (CBE) in the 2013 Birthday Honours for services to the creative industries.

She was nominated for a life peerage in December 2024 by Prime Minister Keir Starmer for the Labour Party as part of the 2024 Political Peerages and was created as Baroness Caine of Kentish Town, of Kentish Town in the London Borough of Camden on 30 January 2025.
