= Antonina (Tur novel) =

1851 Russian novel by Evgenia Tur

- Author: Evgenia Tur
- Original title: Антонина
- Translator: Michael R. Katz
- Language: Russian
- Genre: Fiction
- Publisher: Northwestern University Press (English translation)
- Publication date: 1851
- English publication date: 1996
- Media type: Print
- ISBN: 978-0-8101-1407-4

Antonina (Russian: Антонина) is an 1851 novel by Evgenia Tur, one of several Russian novels influenced by Jane Eyre. A first English translation by Michael Katz was published by Northwestern University Press in 1996.

== Plot ==
The story follows Antonina from her childhood in a troubled household through her early adulthood. After her father's financial decline, her situation worsens, and she is left in the care of relatives who treat her harshly. Life at home becomes increasingly difficult, shaping her sense of isolation and her desire to leave.

Eventually, Antonina finds a way out by taking a position as a governess. This step offers her a degree of independence, but her situation remains uncertain and dependent on others. While working, she forms an emotional attachment that briefly raises the possibility of a more stable future.

These hopes do not last. Social expectations, misunderstandings, and gossip undermine her position and affect how she is perceived by others. As a result, Antonina is forced to give up her plans and faces a return to a more precarious existence.

The novel follows her response to these setbacks, focusing less on external events than on her inner experience. Throughout the narrative, Antonina's character is shaped by endurance and a strong sense of personal integrity, even as her circumstances remain difficult.

== Themes, character analysis, and feminist interpretation ==
Antonina is usually discussed as part of the broader tradition of nineteenth-century Russian women's prose, especially in relation to questions of authorship and narrative voice. The work has been compared to Charlotte Brontë's Jane Eyre. Demidova notes the influence of Brontë's novel, and the publisher of the English translation describes the text as following patterns familiar from the novels of the Brontë sisters.

Critics have noted the novel's focus on Antonina's inner life and moral experience rather than on external success. Her story highlights the limited choices available to women and the effort required to maintain dignity within those constraints.

Jane T. Costlow has discussed Antonina alongside Ivan Turgenev's Neschastnaia, focusing on how both works represent women's suffering and narrative voice.

== Background, publication, and reception ==
Antonina was written at a time when women writers in Russia were becoming more visible in the literary field. As Demidova shows, this period saw growing interest in women's authorship and in the kinds of subjects women writers addressed.

The publication of the English translation in 1996 made the work more accessible to English-language readers and contributed to renewed scholarly interest in Tur's writing.
