= Wendy Nichols, Baroness Nichols of Selby =

British politician and trade unionist

The Right Honourable The Baroness Nichols of Selby OBE

Member of the House of Lords
- Lord Temporal
- Life peerage 31 January 2025

Personal details
- Party: Labour

Wendy Ruth Nichols, Baroness Nichols of Selby OBE is a British politician, trade unionist and life peer.

== Early life ==
Nichols is from Selby in North Yorkshire.

== Career ==
Nichols is UNISON Yorkshire and Humberside Regional Convenor and Branch Secretary.

A child of two Labour councillors, she served as a Labour councillor herself for the Selby North, and later Selby East ward on Selby District Council from 1999 to the council's abolition in 2023. Her election to the council came as a result of a challenge to the High Court after she had initially being declared as having lost, due to a counting error. During her time as Councillor she served as Chair of the Scrutiny Committee; she was elected as an Honorary Alderwoman of the council on 13 December 2022, in recognition of her "exceptional service".

Nichols served for many years on the Labour Party's National Executive Committee. In 2021 she was elected head of its Organisational Sub-Committee, which is in charge of party governance.

In 2007, she was selected as the Labour candidate for the Selby constituency at the 2010 general election, but stepped back from the role in September 2008 following the death of her husband of 28 years, Keith.

Nichols was nominated for a life peerage in December 2024 by Prime Minister Keir Starmer for the Labour Party as part of the 2024 Political Peerages and was created Baroness Nichols of Selby, of Selby in the County of North Yorkshire on 31 January 2025.

== Honours ==
In the 2024 Birthday Honours, Nichols was appointed Officer of the Order of the British Empire (OBE) for political service.
