= Krish Raval, Baron Raval =

British lawyer

The Right Honourable The Lord Raval OBE

Member of the House of Lords
- Lord Temporal
- Life peerage 29 January 2025

Personal details
- Born: Krish Kumar Sureshchandra Raval Ethiopia
- Party: Labour

Krish Kumar Sureshchandra Raval, Baron Raval, OBE is a British lawyer, life peer and the director of Faith in Leadership.

== Early life and education ==
Raval was born in Ethiopia to Indian, Hindu parents. He read law at Trinity College, Cambridge and the University of Sheffield.

== Career ==
Raval is the director of Faith in Leadership, an organisation focused on interfaith cooperation for the public good established in the aftermath of the 7/7 bombings, and is a faculty member of the University of Cambridge's School of Divinity. He is also Chair of Labour Indians, and a member of City Sikhs' Advisory Board.

He was nominated for a life peerage in December 2024 by Prime Minister Keir Starmer for the Labour Party as part of the 2024 Political Peerages. He was created Baron Raval, of Hertsmere in the County of Hertfordshire on 29 January 2025, swearing his oath of allegiance on the Bhagavad-Gītā As It Is.

== Personal life ==
Raval is Hindu. As a child, he attended the Bhaktivedanta Manor in Hertfordshire. He is married to Dr. Lucy Raval, the Lady Raval.
