= Deborah Mattinson, Baroness Mattinson =

UK political consultant and life peer

The Right Honourable The Baroness Mattinson
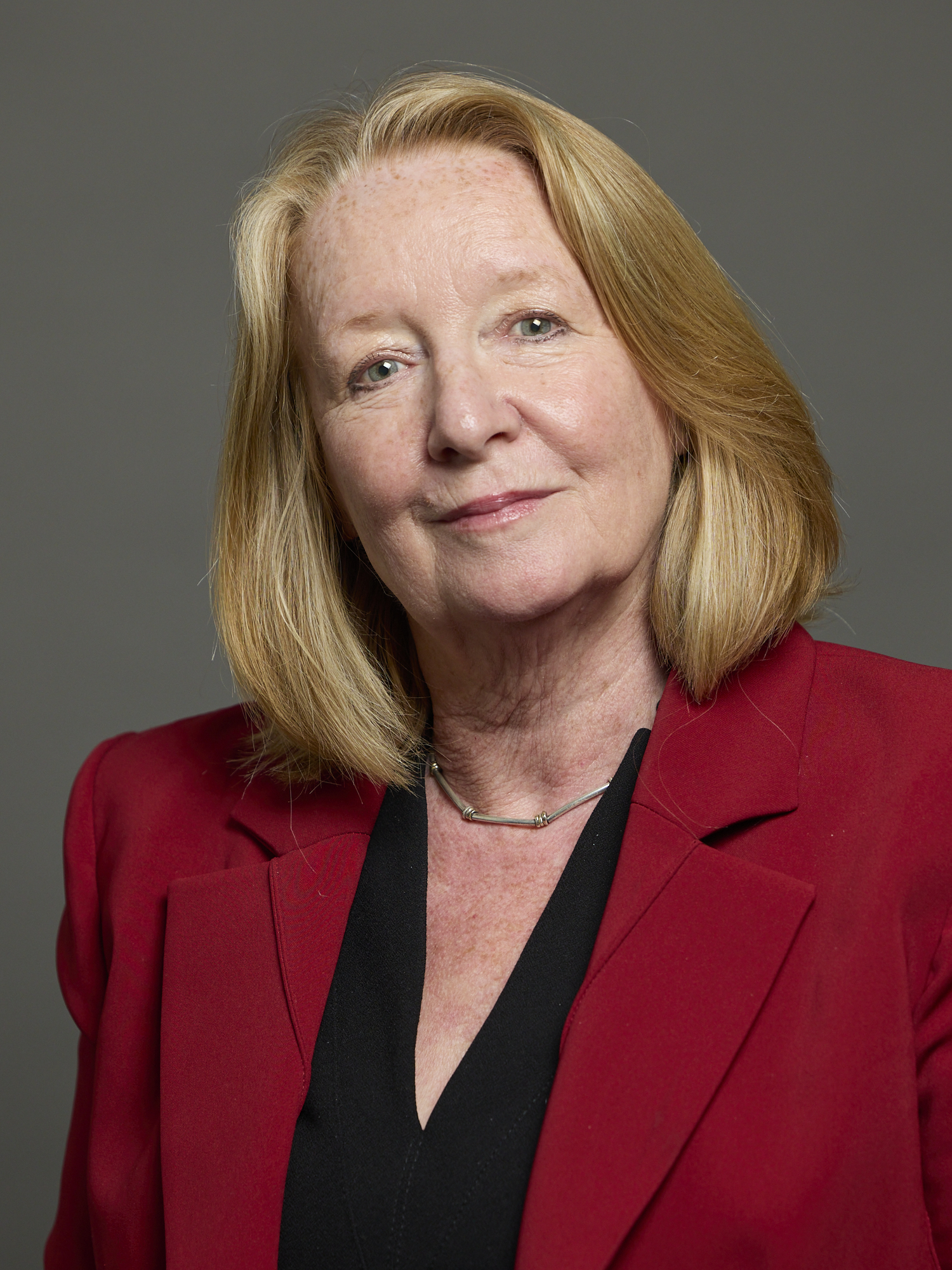
- Official portrait, 2025

Member of the House of Lords
- Lord Temporal
- Life peerage 3 February 2025

Personal details
- Born: September 17, 1956 (age 70) Darlington, England
- Party: Labour
- Spouse: David Pelly (m. 1989)
- Children: 3
- Education: University of Bristol (LLB)

Deborah Susan Mattinson, Baroness Mattinson (born 17 September 1956, Darlington) is a British political consultant and businesswoman. She sits in the House of Lords as a member of the Labour Party.

== Early life and education ==
Deborah Susan Mattinson was born on 17 September 1956 in Darlington, County Durham, to Dick Mattinson, an insurance broker, and Jo Mattinson. She has one brother, Robert. Mattinson attended Cheadle Hulme School for her secondary education before going on to study at the University of Bristol, where she earned an LLB degree.

== Career ==
=== Political consultancy and public service ===
Deborah Mattinson is a political consultant, senior business leader, serial entrepreneur, and charity trustee. She was appointed Director of Strategy for Labour leader Keir Starmer in July 2021 and played a pivotal role in the party's unprecedented electoral success three years later.

Mattinson’s involvement in political consultancy dates back to 1987 when she worked alongside Peter Mandelson and Philip Gould to create Labour's Shadow Communications Agency for Neil Kinnock. She later advised Tony Blair in the run-up to the 1997 general election and subsequently became the chief pollster for Gordon Brown during his tenure as Chancellor of the Exchequer and later as Prime Minister.

During this time, Mattinson became one of the leading commentators on public opinion in Britain, frequently speaking, writing, and broadcasting about the political landscape. In 2010, she published her first book, Talking to a Brick Wall, which chronicled the New Labour years through the eyes of the voter. Her second book, Beyond the Red Wall, published after the 2019 General Election, explored changing voting patterns through ethnographic research, qualitative studies, and quantitative data.

=== Entrepreneurship and business leadership ===
In 1992, Mattinson co-founded Opinion Leader Research, a specialist strategy consultancy, which she later sold to Chime Communications Group. She went on to establish The Smart Company, a CSR strategy business, which was also acquired by Chime and later merged with the Corporate Citizenship Company.

In 2010, Mattinson left Chime to co-found BritainThinks (now Thinks Insight and Strategy), a consultancy firm that worked with a wide array of clients, including Abbott Laboratories, McDonald's, The CityUK, and Apetito. She continued her work at BritainThinks until she transitioned to full-time work with Keir Starmer's team.

=== Charity work ===
Mattinson has applied her political and business expertise to charitable causes. She has served as a trustee for several organizations, including the Dance Umbrella festival and the Green Alliance. Mattinson also chaired the Young Women's Trust (formerly YWCA) for two terms, where she led a major transformation program that included the recruitment of a new board and senior management team, streamlining services, and launching a new brand while returning the charity to financial stability after years of deficit.

Mattinson is also passionate about the theatre and served on the board and development board of the Theatre Royal Stratford East until 2021. She currently serves on an advisory board for the National Theatre.

=== Recent roles and recognition ===
After stepping down from her role with Keir Starmer's team following the election, Mattinson began providing consultancy services to the Progressive Policy Institute, a Washington, D.C.-based think tank, advising the Democratic Party in preparation for the U.S. election. She has since shared her insights and lessons learned with sister political parties in other countries.

In December 2024, Mattinson was nominated for a life peerage by Prime Minister Keir Starmer as part of the 2024 Political Peerages. She was created Baroness Mattinson, of Darlington in the County of Durham on 3 February 2025 and introduced to the House of Lords on 27 February 2025.

In January 2026, Deborah was appointed President of the Market Research Society and, in February of the same year, she was appointed an Honorary Professor at King's College London.

== Personal life ==
Mattinson married David Pelly in 1989, and the couple has three children.

== Publications ==
- Talking to a Brick Wall (2010)
- Beyond the Red Wall (2020)
