= Class, Bureaucracy, and Schools =

Book on American education history

Class, Bureaucracy, and Schools: The Illusion of Educational Change in America
- Title page for Class, Bureaucracy, and Schools: The Illusion of Educational Change in America (1971)
- Author: Michael B. Katz
- Genre: History
- Publication date: 1971

Class, Bureaucracy, and Schools: The Illusion of Educational Change in America is a 1971 book by American historian Michael B. Katz. The book focuses on the history of education in the United States between 1800 and 1885 in public elementary schools, and follows their transition from one-room schools to centralized, bureaucratic school systems. The book was revised and expanded in 1975.

== Publication history ==
- Class, Bureaucracy and Schools: The Illusion of Educational Change in America, Praeger (New York City), 1971, revised edition, 1975.

== See also ==
- Education reform
