= Russell Rook, Baron Rook =

British Anglican priest

The Reverend and Right Honourable The Lord Rook OBE
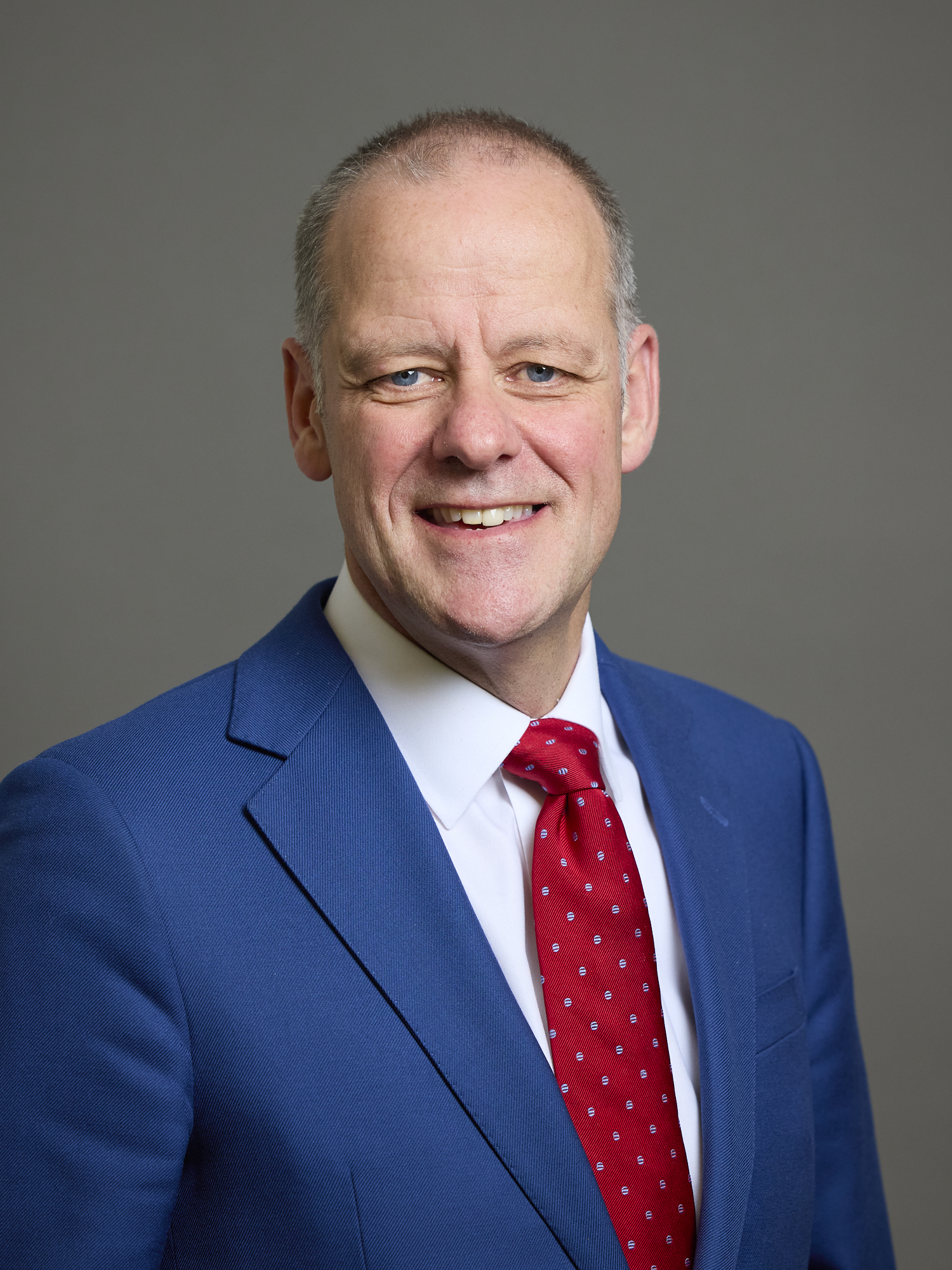
- Official portrait, 2025

Member of the House of Lords
- Lord Temporal
- Life peerage 20 January 2025

Personal details
- Born: Russell David Rook; June 1972 (age 54)
- Party: Labour
- Children: 2
- Education: The Portsmouth Grammar School; Royal College of Music (BMus); King's College London (MA); University of St Andrews (PhD)

Russell David Rook, Baron Rook, OBE (born June 1972) is a British Anglican priest and life peer.

== Early life ==
Russell was born in June 1972. He was educated at the Portsmouth Grammar School and spent his gap year after graduation working for The Salvation Army. He then studied at the Royal College of Music and King's College London. He undertook postgraduate research on the American theologian Robert Jenson at the University of St Andrews, completing his PhD degree in 2006. His thesis was titled "Rhyming hope and history: a study of the relationship between theology and culture in the work of Robert Jenson, with particular reference to the concepts of time, space and language".

== Career ==
Rook worked for The Salvation Army as an evangelist, church planter and youth worker in the church's United Kingdom and Ireland Territory. From 2002 to 2008, he was director of ALOVE, the territory's youth ministry team.

Since 2016, Rook has been a partner in the Good Faith Partnership. He has been involved with various charities. He served as a Parliamentary aide to Maeve Sherlock, and was an adviser on faith and civil society to Ed Miliband when he was Leader of the Opposition.

Rook was ordained in the Church of England as a deacon in 2022 and as a priest in 2023. He served his self-supporting curacy at St Dionis, Parsons Green in the Diocese of London. In June 2025, he left his curacy to become a "Licensed Preacher Under Seal" in his diocese, while maintaining a link with St Dionis' Church.

He was appointed Officer of the Order of the British Empire (OBE) in the 2022 New Year Honours for services to social action.

In late 2024, Rook was nominated for a life peerage by Prime Minister Keir Starmer for the Labour Party. He was created Baron Rook, of Wimbledon in the London Borough of Merton, on 20 January 2025, and was introduced to the House of Lords on 23 January. He made his maiden speech on 13 March 2025 during a debate on integration and community cohesion.

== Personal life ==
Rook is married to Charlotte Eksteen, a professional cellist. They have two sons.

== Selected works ==
- Rook, Russell; White, Aaron (2007). The Hitchhiker's Guide to the Kingdom. Milton Keynes: Authentic Media. ISBN 978-1850787341.
- Rook, Russell (2008). A Certain Rumour: Learning to Live Hopefully Ever After. Milton Keynes: Authentic Media. ISBN 978-1850787792.
- Holmes, Stephen; Rook, Russell, eds. (2008). What are We Waiting For?: Christian Hope and Contemporary Culture. Milton Keynes: Paternoster Press. ISBN 978-1842276020.
- Rook, Russell D. (2011). Rhyming Hope and History: Theology and Culture in the Work of Robert Jenson. Eugene, Oregon: Pickwick Publications. ISBN 978-1608996001.
