= Mike Katz, Baron Katz =

British politician

The Right Honourable The Lord Katz MBE
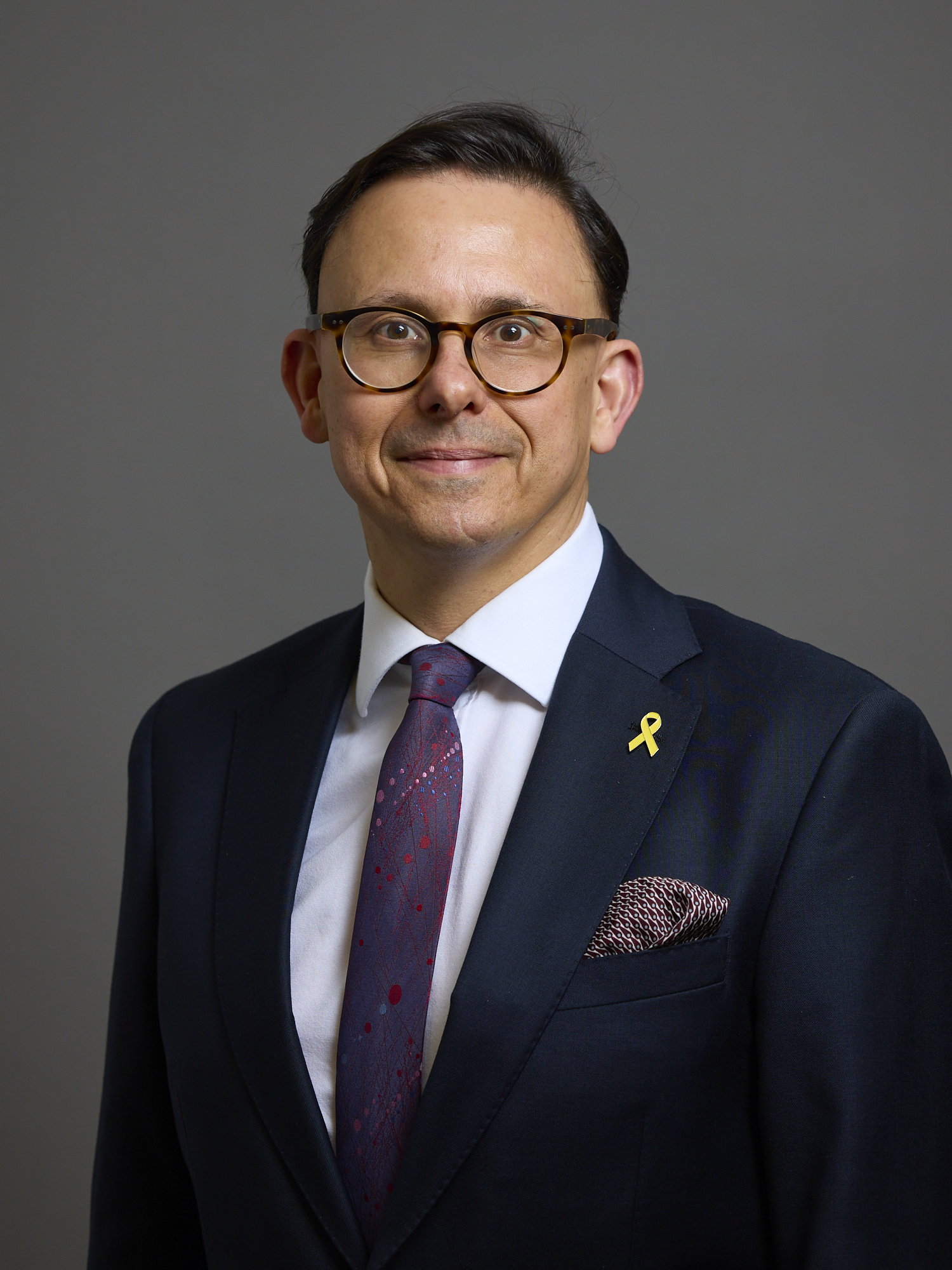
- Official portrait, 2025

Lord-in-Waiting Government Whip
- Incumbent
- Assumed office 11 April 2025
- Prime Minister: Keir Starmer; Andy Burnham

Member of the House of Lords
- Lord Temporal
- Life peerage 28 January 2025

Personal details
- Born: Michael David Katz
- Party: Labour

Michael David Katz, Baron Katz, MBE, is a British politician and national chairman of the Jewish Labour Movement.

== Political career ==
Katz served as a councillor for Camden London Borough Council from 2010 to 2014. He was the Labour parliamentary candidate for Hendon in 2017 and Cities of London and Westminster in 2001.

=== Labour antisemitism report ===
In 2016, Katz was noted as saying that he had not seen any evidence of antisemitism in the Labour Party for which he was criticised by many in the Jewish community. However, as chair of the Jewish Labour Movement, Katz gradually came to believe that the Labour Party under Jeremy Corbyn had become institutionally antisemitic, citing persistent inaction, denial, and political interference in addressing complaints. At the 2016 Labour Party Conference, Katz was heckled while speaking on antisemitism, an incident he saw as indicative of growing hostility. By April 2019, Jewish Labour Movement passed a motion of no confidence in Corbyn and warned of possible disaffiliation, describing local party environments as increasingly hostile to Jewish members. Following the BBC Panorama documentary 'Is Labour Antisemitic?', broadcast in July 2019, Katz asserted in an article for The Times that “no objective viewer can doubt that Labour is institutionally racist against Jews".

=== Life peerage ===
Katz was nominated for a life peerage in December 2024 by Prime Minister Keir Starmer for the Labour Party as part of the 2024 Political Peerages. He was created Baron Katz, of Fortune Green in the London Borough of Camden, on 28 January 2025. On 11 April 2025, Katz was appointed as a Lord in Waiting (Government Whip).

== Honors ==
Katz was appointed a Member of the Order of the British Empire (MBE) in the 2025 New Year Honours for Political and Public Service.

== Elections contested ==
Election	Constituency	Party	Votes	% votes	Position	Ref.
2001 general election	Cities of London and Westminster	Labour	11,238	33.1	2nd of 5	
2010 Camden Council election	Kilburn	Labour	1,819	15.5	Elected	
2017 general election	Hendon	Labour	24,006	46.0	2nd of 5	
