= List of life peerages (2024–present) =

Peerages and baronetcies of Britain and Ireland
Extant	All
Dukes	Dukedoms
Marquesses	Marquessates
Earls	Earldoms
Viscounts	Viscountcies
Barons	Baronies
En, Sc, GB, Ire, UK (law, life: 1958–1979, 1979–1997, 1997–2010, 2010–2024, 2024–present)
Baronets	Baronetcies

This is a list of life peerages in the Peerage of the United Kingdom created under the Life Peerages Act 1958 since 2024, during the tenure of Labour prime ministers Sir Keir Starmer and Andy Burnham.

As regards appointments, the Labour Party manifesto aimed to achieve "immediate reform of the House of Lords", stating "the second chamber of Parliament has become too big", and that "we will reform the appointments process to ensure the quality of new appointments and will seek to improve the national and regional balance of the second chamber".

== Sir Keir Starmer (2024–2026) ==
Living

Number	Date of creation	Name	Title	Territorial qualification	Party affiliation when taking seat	Date of retirement (if applicable)	Date of extinction (if applicable)
1	17 July 2024 (a.m.)	Patrick Vallance	Baron Vallance of Balham	of Balham in the London Borough of Wandsworth	Labour		
2	17 July 2024 (p.m.)	Jacqui Smith ‡	Baroness Smith of Malvern	of Malvern in the County of Worcestershire	Labour		
3	18 July 2024 (a.m.)	James Timpson	Baron Timpson	of Manley in the County of Cheshire	Labour		
4	18 July 2024 (p.m.)	Richard Hermer	Baron Hermer	of Penylan in the City of Cardiff	Labour		
5	19 July 2024	David Hanson ‡	Baron Hanson of Flint	of Flint in the County of Flintshire	Labour		
6	12 August 2024 (a.m.)	Caroline Pidgeon	Baroness Pidgeon	of Newington in the London Borough of Southwark	Liberal Democrats		
7	12 August 2024 (p.m.)	John Spellar ‡	Baron Spellar	of Smethwick in the County of the West Midlands	Labour		
8	13 August 2024 (a.m.)	Rosie Winterton ‡	Baroness Winterton of Doncaster	of Doncaster in the County of South Yorkshire	Labour		
9	13 August 2024 (p.m.)	Barbara Keeley ‡	Baroness Keeley	of Worsley in the City of Salford	Labour		
10	14 August 2024 (a.m.)	Margaret Hodge ‡	Baroness Hodge of Barking	of Great Massingham in the County of Norfolk	Labour		
11	14 August 2024 (p.m.)	Margaret Beckett ‡	Baroness Beckett	of Old Normanton in the City of Derby	Labour		
12	15 August 2024 (a.m.)	Kevan Jones ‡	Baron Beamish	of Beamish in the County of Durham	Labour		
13	15 August 2024 (p.m.)	John Cryer ‡	Baron Cryer	of Leyton in the London Borough of Waltham Forest	Labour		
14	16 August 2024 (a.m.)	Minette Batters	Baroness Batters	of Downton in the County of Wiltshire	Crossbench		
15	16 August 2024 (p.m.)	Tom Elliott ‡	Baron Elliott of Ballinamallard	of Ballinamallard in the County of Fermanagh	Ulster Unionist		
16	19 August 2024 (a.m.)	Harriet Harman ‡	Baroness Harman	of Peckham in the London Borough of Southwark	Labour		
17	19 August 2024 (p.m.)	Graham Brady ‡	Baron Brady of Altrincham	of Birch-in-Rusholme in the County of Greater Manchester	Conservative		
18	20 August 2024 (a.m.)	Alok Sharma ‡	Baron Sharma	of Reading in the Royal County of Berkshire	Conservative		
19	20 August 2024 (p.m.)	Chris Grayling ‡	Baron Grayling	of Ashtead in the County of Surrey	Conservative		
20	21 August 2024 (a.m.)	Liam Booth-Smith	Baron Booth-Smith	of Newcastle-under-Lyme in the County of Staffordshire	Conservative		
21	21 August 2024 (p.m.)	Theresa May ‡	Baroness May of Maidenhead	of Sonning in the Royal County of Berkshire	Conservative		
22	22 August 2024 (a.m.)	Eleanor Laing ‡	Baroness Laing of Elderslie	of Epping Forest in the County of Essex	Conservative		
23	22 August 2024 (p.m.)	Hilary Cass	Baroness Cass	of Barnet in Greater London	Crossbench		
24	23 August 2024	Craig Mackinlay ‡	Baron Mackinlay of Richborough	of Rochester in the County of Kent	Conservative		
25	9 October 2024	Catherine Smith	Baroness Smith of Cluny	of Cluny in the City of Edinburgh	Labour		
26	15 November 2024	Poppy Gustafsson	Baroness Gustafsson	of Chesterton in the City of Cambridge	Labour		
27	15 January 2025 (a.m.)	Margaret Curran ‡	Baroness Curran	of Townhead in the City of Glasgow	Labour		
28	15 January 2025 (p.m.)	Claude Moraes #	Baron Moraes	of Hawkhill in the City of Dundee	Labour		
29	16 January 2025 (a.m.)	Theresa Griffin #	Baroness Griffin of Princethorpe	of Princethorpe in the County of Warwickshire	Labour		
30	16 January 2025 (p.m.)	Phil Wilson ‡	Baron Wilson of Sedgefield	of Trimdon in the County of Durham	Labour		
31	17 January 2025 (a.m.)	Thérèse Coffey ‡	Baroness Coffey	of Saxmundham in the County of Suffolk and of Grassendale in the City of Liverpool	Conservative		
32	17 January 2025 (p.m.)	David Evans	Baron Evans of Sealand	of Chester in the County of Cheshire	Labour		
33	20 January 2025 (a.m.)	Brendan Barber	Baron Barber of Ainsdale	of Southport in the Metropolitan Borough of Sefton	Labour		
34	20 January 2025 (p.m.)	Russell Rook	Baron Rook	of Wimbledon in the London Borough of Merton	Labour		
35	21 January 2025 (a.m.)	Toby Young	Baron Young of Acton	of Acton in the London Borough of Ealing	Conservative		
36	21 January 2025 (p.m.)	Nigel Biggar	Baron Biggar	of Castle Douglas in the Stewartry of Kirkcudbright	Conservative		
37	22 January 2025 (a.m.)	Alison Levitt, Baroness Carlile of Berriew	Baroness Levitt	of Beachamwell Warren in the County of Norfolk	Labour		
38	22 January 2025 (p.m.)	Gerard Lemos	Baron Lemos	of Thornton Heath in the London Borough of Croydon	Labour		
39	23 January 2025 (a.m.)	Lyn Brown ‡	Baroness Brown of Silvertown	of West Ham in the London Borough of Newham	Labour		
40	23 January 2025 (p.m.)	Carwyn Jones	Baron Jones of Penybont	of Penybont in the County of Pen-y-bont ar Ogwr	Labour		
41	24 January 2025 (a.m.)	Kevin Brennan ‡	Baron Brennan of Canton	of Canton in the City of Cardiff	Labour		
42	24 January 2025 (p.m.)	Simon Pitkeathley	Baron Pitkeathley of Camden Town	of Tufnell Park in the London Borough of Islington	Labour		
43	27 January 2025 (a.m.)	Mary Bousted	Baroness Bousted	of Bleasdale in the County of Lancashire	Labour		
44	27 January 2025 (p.m.)	Julie Elliott ‡	Baroness Elliott of Whitburn Bay	of Whitburn Bay in the City of Sunderland	Labour		
45	28 January 2025 (a.m.)	Mike Katz	Baron Katz	of Fortune Green in the London Borough of Camden	Labour		
46	28 January 2025 (p.m.)	Joanne Cash	Baroness Cash	of Banbridge in the County of Down	Conservative		
47	29 January 2025 (a.m.)	Krish Raval	Baron Raval	of Hertsmere in the County of Hertfordshire	Labour		
48	29 January 2025 (p.m.)	Mark Pack	Baron Pack	of Crouch Hill in the London Borough of Islington	Liberal Democrats		
49	30 January 2025 (a.m.)	Kay Carberry	Baroness Carberry of Muswell Hill	of Muswell Hill in the London Borough of Haringey	Labour		
50	30 January 2025 (p.m.)	Dinah Caine	Baroness Caine of Kentish Town	of Kentish Town in the London Borough of Camden	Labour		
51	31 January 2025 (a.m.)	Anne Longfield	Baroness Longfield	of Lower Wharfedale in the County of Yorkshire	Labour		
52	31 January 2025 (p.m.)	Wendy Nichols	Baroness Nichols of Selby	of Selby in the County of North Yorkshire	Labour		
53	3 February 2025 (a.m.)	Wendy Alexander	Baroness Alexander of Cleveden	of Cleveden in the City of Glasgow	Labour		
54	3 February 2025 (p.m.)	Deborah Mattinson	Baroness Mattinson	of Darlington in the County of Durham	Labour		
55	4 February 2025 (a.m.)	Sue Gray	Baroness Gray of Tottenham	of Tottenham in the London Borough of Haringey	Labour		
56	4 February 2025 (p.m.)	Marvin Rees	Baron Rees of Easton	of Saint Pauls in the City of Bristol	Labour		
57	5 February 2025 (a.m.)	Rachel Maclean ‡	Baroness Maclean of Redditch	of Hanbury in the County of Worcestershire	Conservative		
58	5 February 2025 (p.m.)	Anji Hunter	Baroness Hunter of Auchenreoch	of Edzell in the County of Angus	Labour		
59	6 February 2025 (a.m.)	Luciana Berger ‡	Baroness Berger	of Barnhill in the London Borough of Brent	Labour		
60	6 February 2025 (p.m.)	Roger Evans	Baron Evans of Guisborough	of Guisborough in the County of North Yorkshire	Conservative		
61	7 February 2025 (a.m.)	Steve McCabe ‡	Baron McCabe	of Selly Oak in the City of Birmingham and of Broadfield in the County of Renfrewshire	Labour		
62	7 February 2025 (p.m.)	Thangam Debbonaire ‡	Baroness Debbonaire	of De Beauvoir Town in the London Borough of Hackney	Labour		
63	10 February 2025	Anne Marie Rafferty	Baroness Rafferty	of Kirkcaldy in the County of Fife	Labour		
64	21 February 2025	Shaffaq Mohammed #	Baron Mohammed of Tinsley	of Sheffield in the County of South Yorkshire	Liberal Democrats		
65	9 May 2025 (a.m.)	Amanda Spielman	Baroness Spielman	of Durlston in the County of Dorset	Conservative		
66	9 May 2025 (p.m.)	Alister Jack ‡	Baron Jack of Courance	of Courance in the County of Dumfriesshire	Conservative		
67	12 May 2025 (a.m.)	Mark Harper ‡	Baron Harper	of Forest of Dean in the County of Gloucestershire	Conservative		
68	12 May 2025 (p.m.)	Stephen Massey	Baron Massey of Hampstead	of Lacock in the County of Wiltshire	Conservative		
69	13 May 2025 (a.m.)	Victoria Prentis ‡	Baroness Prentis of Banbury	of Somerton in the County of Oxfordshire	Conservative		
70	13 May 2025 (p.m.)	Michael Gove ‡	Baron Gove	of Torry in the City of Aberdeen	Conservative		
71	28 May 2025 (a.m.)	Eleanor Shawcross, Baroness Wolfson of Aspley Guise	Baroness Shawcross-Wolfson	of Aspley Guise in the County of Bedfordshire	Conservative		
72	28 May 2025 (p.m.)	Simon Hart ‡	Baron Hart of Tenby	of Lampeter Velfrey in the County of Pembrokeshire	Conservative		
73	17 July 2025 (a.m.)	Simon Case	Baron Case	of Fairford in the County of Gloucestershire	Crossbench		
74	17 July 2025 (p.m.)	Sharon White	Baroness White of Tufnell Park	of Tufnell Park in the London Borough of Islington	Crossbench		
75	18 July 2025	Tim Barrow	Baron Barrow	of Penrith in the County of Cumbria	Crossbench		
76	9 October 2025	Jason Stockwood	Baron Stockwood	of Great Grimsby and Cleethorpes in the County of Lincolnshire	Labour		
77	13 October 2025	Liz Lloyd	Baroness Lloyd of Effra	of Tulse Hill in the London Borough of Lambeth	Labour		
78	19 November 2025	Alan Whitehead ‡	Baron Whitehead	of Saint Mary's in the City of Southampton	Labour		
79	24 November 2025	Clare Gerada †	Baroness Gerada	of Kennington in the London Borough of Lambeth	Crossbench		
80	26 November 2025	Polly Neate †	Baroness Neate	of Hammersmith in the London Borough of Hammersmith and Fulham	Crossbench		
81	7 January 2026 (a.m.)	Peter John	Baron John of Southwark	of Pattiswick in the County of Essex	Labour		
82	7 January 2026 (p.m.)	Brenda Dacres	Baroness Dacres of Lewisham	of Deptford in the London Borough of Lewisham	Labour		
83	8 January 2026 (a.m.)	Matthew Doyle	Baron Doyle	of Great Barford in the County of Bedfordshire	Labour		
84	8 January 2026 (p.m.)	Len Duvall	Baron Duvall	of Woolwich in the Royal Borough of Greenwich	Labour		
85	9 January 2026 (a.m.)	Shama Tatler	Baroness Shah	of Wembley in the London Borough of Brent	Labour		
86	9 January 2026 (p.m.)	Nick Forbes	Baron Forbes of Newcastle	of Heaton in the City of Newcastle upon Tyne	Labour		
87	12 January 2026 (a.m.)	Joe Docherty	Baron Docherty of Milngavie	of Alexandria in the County of Dunbartonshire	Labour		
88	12 January 2026 (p.m.)	Sara Hyde	Baroness Hyde of Bemerton	of King's Cross in the London Borough of Islington	Labour		
89	13 January 2026 (a.m.)	Tracey Paul	Baroness Paul of Shepherd's Bush	of Shepherd’s Bush in the London Borough of Hammersmith and Fulham	Labour		
90	13 January 2026 (p.m.)	Andy Roe	Baron Roe of West Wickham	of West Wickham in the London Borough of Bromley	Labour		
91	14 January 2026 (a.m.)	Carol Linforth	Baroness Linforth	of Redland in the City of Bristol	Labour		
92	14 January 2026 (p.m.)	Neena Gill #	Baroness Gill	of Jewellery Quarter in the City of Birmingham and of Southall in the London Borough of Ealing	Labour		
93	15 January 2026 (a.m.)	David Pitt-Watson	Baron Pitt-Watson	of Kirkland of Glencairn in the County of Dumfriesshire	Labour		
94	15 January 2026 (p.m.)	Sharron Davies	Baroness Davies of Devonport	of Bradford-on-Avon in the County of Wiltshire	Conservative		
95	16 January 2026 (a.m.)	Catherine MacLeod	Baroness MacLeod of Camusdarach	of Lochaber in the County of Inverness-shire	Labour		
96	16 January 2026 (p.m.)	Peter Babudu	Baron Babudu	of Peckham in the London Borough of Southwark	Labour		
97	19 January 2026 (a.m.)	Farmida Bi	Baroness Bi	of Bermondsey in the London Borough of Southwark	Labour		
98	19 January 2026 (p.m.)	David Isaac	Baron Isaac	of Abergavenny in the County of Monmouthshire	Labour		
99	20 January 2026 (a.m.)	Richard Walker	Baron Walker of Broxton	of Broxton in the County of Cheshire	Labour		
100	20 January 2026 (p.m.)	Katie Martin	Baroness Martin of Brockley	of Ladywell in the London Borough of Lewisham	Labour		
101	21 January 2026 (a.m.)	Geeta Nargund	Baroness Nargund	of Wimbledon in the London Borough of Merton and of Tooting in the London Borough of Wandsworth	Labour		
102	21 January 2026 (p.m.)	Michael Barber	Baron Barber of Chittlehampton	of Chittlehampton in the County of Devon	Labour		
103	27 January 2026 (a.m.)	Sarah Teather ‡	Baroness Teather	of Broughton in the County of Leicestershire	Liberal Democrats		
104	27 January 2026 (p.m.)	Simon Heffer	Baron Blackwater	of Great and Little Leighs in the County of Essex	Conservative		
105	28 January 2026 (a.m.)	Sophy Antrobus	Baroness Antrobus	of Old Sarum in the County of Wiltshire	Labour		
106	28 January 2026 (p.m.)	Mike Dixon	Baron Dixon of Jericho	of Jericho in the City of Oxford	Liberal Democrats		
107	29 January 2026 (a.m.)	Rhiannon Leaman	Baroness Leaman	of Chipping Sodbury in the County of Gloucestershire	Liberal Democrats		
108	29 January 2026 (p.m.)	Uday Nagaraju	Baron Nagaraju	of Bloomsbury in the London Borough of Camden	Labour		
109	30 January 2026 (a.m.)	Russell Hobby	Baron Hobby	of Belmont in the London Borough of Sutton	Non-affiliated		
110	30 January 2026 (p.m.)	John Redwood ‡	Baron Redwood	of Wokingham in the Royal County of Berkshire	Conservative		
111	5 February 2026	Ann Limb	Baroness Limb	of Moss Side in the City of Manchester	Labour		
112	6 February 2026	Charles Hay, 16th Earl of Kinnoull §	Baron Kinnoull of the Ochils	of Abernyte in the County of Perthshire	Crossbench		
113	18 February 2026	Dominic Hubbard, 6th Baron Addington §	Baron Hubbard	of Lambourne in the Royal County of Berkshire	Liberal Democrats		
114	30 March 2026	John Russell, 7th Earl Russell §	Baron Russell of Forest Hill	of Forest Hill in the London Borough of Lewisham	Liberal Democrats		
115	20 April 2026	Katherine Grainger	Baroness Grainger	of Garelochhead in the County of Dunbartonshire	Crossbench		
116	1 June 2026 (a.m.)	Charles Wellesley, 9th Duke of Wellington # §	Baron Wellington of Stratfield Saye	of Stratfield Saye in the County of Hampshire and of Colmonell in the County of Ayrshire	Crossbench		
117	1 June 2026 (p.m.)	Godfrey Bewicke-Copley, 7th Baron Cromwell §	Baron Cromwell of Tattershall	of Misterton in the County of Leicestershire	Crossbench		
118	2 June 2026 (a.m.)	Sebastian Grigg, 4th Baron Altrincham §	Baron Altrincham of Islington	of Holland Park in the Royal Borough of Kensington and Chelsea	Conservative		
119	2 June 2026 (p.m.)	Edward Howard, 8th Earl of Effingham §	Baron Effingham of Bookham Commons	of Effingham in the County of Surrey	Conservative		
120	3 June 2026 (a.m.)	Stephen Benn, 3rd Viscount Stansgate §	Baron Stansgate of Holland Park	of Stansgate in the County of Essex	Labour		
121	3 June 2026 (p.m.)	Thomas Galbraith, 2nd Baron Strathclyde §	Baron Strathclyde of Barskimming	of Barskimming in the County of Ayr	Conservative		
122	4 June 2026 (a.m.)	Colin Moynihan, 4th Baron Moynihan ‡ §	Baron Moynihan of Purbeck	of Leeds in the County of York	Conservative		
123	4 June 2026 (p.m.)	Nicholas Trench, 9th Earl of Clancarty §	Baron Clancarty of the Hangers	of Petersfield in the County of Hampshire	Crossbench		
124	5 June 2026 (a.m.)	Rupert Ponsonby, 7th Baron de Mauley §	Baron de Mauley of Canford	of Canford in the County of Gloucestershire	Conservative		
125	5 June 2026 (p.m.)	Giles Goschen, 4th Viscount Goschen §	Baron Hawkhurst	of Otterhead in the County of Somerset	Conservative		
126	8 June 2026 (a.m.)	Simon Russell, 3rd Baron Russell of Liverpool §	Baron Russell of Kiloran	of Colonsay in the County of Argyll	Crossbench		
127	8 June 2026 (p.m.)	Charles Colville, 5th Viscount Colville of Culross §	Baron Colville of Waveney	of Geldeston in the County of Norfolk	Crossbench		
128	9 June 2026 (a.m.)	John Pakington, 7th Baron Hampton §	Baron Hampton of Newington Green	of Newington Green in the London Borough of Hackney	Crossbench		
129	9 June 2026 (p.m.)	Frederick Curzon, 7th Earl Howe §	Baron Curzon of Amersham	of Amersham in the County of Buckinghamshire	Conservative		
130	10 June 2026 (a.m.)	Massey Lopes, 4th Baron Roborough §	Baron Lopes	of Ditsworthy in the County of Devon	Conservative		
131	10 June 2026 (p.m.)	Richard Gilbey, 12th Baron Vaux of Harrowden §	Baron Gilbey	of Gatehouse of Fleet in the Stewartry of Kirkcudbright	Crossbench		
132	11 June 2026 (a.m.)	Mark Cubitt, 5th Baron Ashcombe §	Baron Ashcombe of Boldre	of Boldre in the County of Hampshire	Conservative		
133	11 June 2026 (p.m.)	Patrick Stopford, 9th Earl of Courtown §	Baron Stopford of Saltersford	of Saltersford in the County of Cheshire	Conservative		
134	12 June 2026 (a.m.)	Jonathan Berry, 5th Viscount Camrose §	Baron Berry	of Aldsworth in the County of Gloucestershire	Conservative		
135	12 June 2026 (p.m.)	Daniel Mosley, 4th Baron Ravensdale §	Baron Ravensdale of Little Eaton	of Little Eaton in the County of Derbyshire	Crossbench		
136	15 June 2026 (a.m.)	John Suenson-Taylor, 3rd Baron Grantchester §	Baron Grantchester of Audlem	of Nantwich in the County of Cheshire	Labour		
137	15 June 2026 (p.m.)	Aeneas Mackay, 15th Lord Reay §	Baron Reay of Reay	of Farr in the County of Sutherland	Conservative		
138	16 June 2026 (a.m.)	Jasset Ormsby-Gore, 7th Baron Harlech §	Baron Harlech of Glyn Cywarch	of Glyn Cywarch in the County of Merioneth	Conservative		
139	16 June 2026 (p.m.)	Richard Denison, 9th Baron Londesborough §	Baron Londesborough of Richmond Hill	of Londesborough in the County of Yorkshire	Crossbench		
140	17 June 2026 (a.m.)	William Stonor, 8th Baron Camoys §	Baron Stonor	of Henley-on-Thames in the County of Oxfordshire	Conservative		
141	17 June 2026 (p.m.)	Timothy Elliot-Murray-Kynynmound, 7th Earl of Minto §	Baron Minto of Burncrooks	of Minto in the County of Roxburghshire	Conservative		

† recommended by House of Lords Appointments Commission
‡ former MP
# former MEP
§ Elected hereditary peer under the House of Lords Act 1999 until 29 April 2026

== Andy Burnham (2026–present) ==
Living

Number	Date of creation	Name	Title	Territorial qualification	Party affiliation when taking seat	Date of retirement (if applicable)	Date of extinction (if applicable)
1	17 August 2026 (a.m.)	Christina McAnea	Baroness McAnea	of Kelvingrove in the City of Glasgow	Labour		
2	17 August 2026 (p.m.)	Tim J. Smith	Baron Smith of Ranmoor	of Ranmoor in the City of Sheffield	Labour		
3	18 August 2026 (a.m.)	Parvais Jabbar	Baron Jabbar	of Little Venice in the City of Westminster	Labour		
4	18 August 2026 (p.m.)	Alison Lowe	Baroness Lowe of Armley	of Seacroft in the City of Leeds	Labour		
5	19 August 2026 (a.m.)	Ken Macintosh	Baron Macintosh of Eastwood	of Eastwood in the County of Renfrewshire	Labour		
6	19 August 2026 (p.m.)	Swaran Singh	Baron Singh of Solihull	of Solihull in the County of West Midlands	Conservative		
7	20 August 2026 (a.m.)	Nick Stace	Baron Stace	of Brighton in the County of East Sussex	Labour		
8	20 August 2026 (p.m.)	Sadiq Khan ‡	Baron Khan of Tooting	of Tooting in the London Borough of Wandsworth	Labour		
9	21 August 2026 (a.m.)	June Sarpong	Baroness Sarpong	of Walthamstow in the London Borough of Waltham Forest	Labour		
10	21 August 2026 (p.m.)	Roberto Neri	Baron Neri	of Norwood in Greater London	Labour		
11	24 August 2026 (a.m.)	Ruth Mackenzie	Baroness Mackenzie of Sherwood	of Sherwood in the City of Nottingham	Labour		
12	24 August 2026 (p.m.)	Anas Sarwar ‡	Baron Sarwar	of Maxwell Park in the City of Glasgow	Labour		
13	25 August 2026 (a.m.)	David Ross	Baron Ross of Nevill Holt	of Great Grimsby in the County of Lincolnshire	Conservative		
14	25 August 2026 (p.m.)	Brian Leveson	Baron Leveson of Liverpool	of Liverpool in the County of Merseyside	Crossbench		
15	26 August 2026 (a.m.)	Marcus Davey	Baron Davey of Chalk Farm	of Chalk Farm in the London Borough of Camden	Labour		
16	26 August 2026 (p.m.)	Martin McTague	Baron McTague	of Heighington in the County of Durham	Labour		
17	27 August 2026 (a.m.)	Chris Wormald	Baron Wormald	of Dulwich in the London Borough of Lambeth	Crossbench		
18	27 August 2026 (p.m.)	Tim Leunig	Baron Leunig	of Surbiton in the Royal Borough of Kingston upon Thames	Liberal Democrats		
19	28 August 2026 (a.m.)	Mark Petterson	Baron Petterson	of Shenington in the County of Oxfordshire	Liberal Democrats		
20	28 August 2028 (p.m.)	Barbara Mills	Baroness Mills of Greenwich	of Greenwich in Greater London	Labour		
21	1 September 2026 (a.m.)	Alison Garnham	Baroness Garnham	of Stoke Newington in the London Borough of Hackney	Labour		
22	1 September 2026 (p.m.)	Julia Aglionby	Baroness Aglionby	of Armathwaite in the County of Cumbria	Liberal Democrats		
23	2 September 2026 (a.m.)	Hannah Kitching	Baroness Kitching of Penistone	of Penistone in the County of South Yorkshire	Liberal Democrats		
24	2 September 2026 (p.m.)	Cathy Ashley	Baroness Ashley of Lambeth	of Lambeth in the London Borough of Lambeth	Labour		
25	3 September 2026 (a.m.)	Kitty Ussher ‡	Baroness Ussher	of Burnley in the County of Lancashire	Labour		
26	3 September 2026 (p.m.)	Dave McCobb	Baron McCobb	of Kingston upon Hull in the East Riding of Yorkshire	Liberal Democrats		
27	4 September 2026	Patrick Sanders	Baron Sanders of Hallingdal	of Hallingdal in the Kingdom of Norway and East Knoyle in the County of Wiltshire	Conservative		
28	14 September 2026	Saul Lehrfreund	Baron Lehrfreund	of Highbury in the London Borough of Islington	Labour		

‡ former MP

=== Peerages to be created ===
It has been announced that the following person will be created a life peer, but his peerage has not yet been created:

Crossbench

Michael Briggs, Lord Briggs of Westbourne

== See also ==
- List of life peerages
- List of hereditary peers in the House of Lords by virtue of a life peerage
