= List of ethnic minority politicians in the United Kingdom =

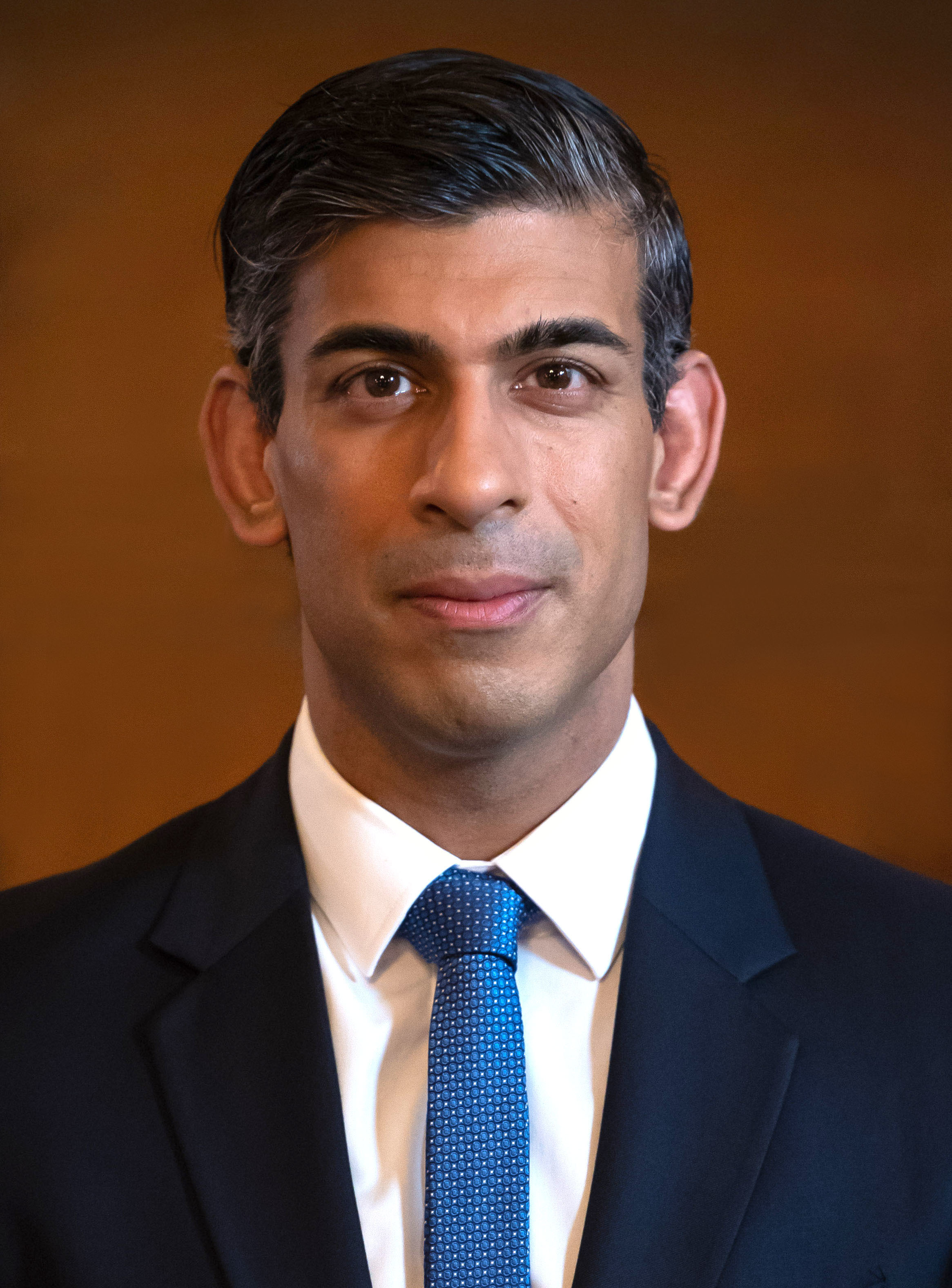
Rishi Sunak served as Prime Minister from 2022 to 2024

These are lists of people who belong to non-European ethnic minorities and have been elected as Members of the House of Commons of the United Kingdom, European Parliament, and other British devolved bodies, as well as members of the non-elected House of Lords.

== Definitions ==
A research briefing published by the House of Commons of the United Kingdom Library in 2023 notes that:

There is no official list of the religious or ethnic background of Members of Parliament. MPs are not required to declare this information and we therefore rely on external sources and any records of self-identification by MPs. Differing understandings of and attitudes towards ethnicity mean it is difficult to be certain about when the first MP from a minority ethnic background entered Parliament and how many MPs from minority ethnic backgrounds there have been since.

According to a research paper from House of Commons Library, published in 2020, the first ethnic minority MP was elected in 1767 – excluding Jews, who a House of Commons Library briefing paper states generally considered themselves to be a religious rather than an ethnic minority in the 18th/19th century. This was James Townsend, a Whig MP who was of one-eighth African ancestry and who later went on to become Mayor of London in 1772.

Following the election of Anas Sarwar as Scottish Labour Party leader in February 2021, he was described as the first person from an ethnic minority to lead a major British political party, which led to debate about why Jewish party leaders had been excluded from this comparison. Stephen Bush, the political editor of the New Statesman, wrote that "As far as British law is concerned, the answer is open-and-shut: we count as both an ethnic and a religious grouping for the purpose of equalities and employment law." He stated: "Whether Benjamin Disraeli would feel today that he were an ethnic-minority Briton is unknowable: but we can say with copper-bottomed certainty that he and other ethnically-Jewish Britons faced what we would now recognise as workplace discrimination in addition to the open dissemination of racist tropes about Disraeli and his family by his political opponents." The House of Commons Library briefing paper notes that the first practising Jew to sit in the Commons was Lionel de Rothschild, who was first elected in 1847 but who refused to take the Christian oath that MPs are required to swear. He took his seat once the rules had been changed, allowing him to swear on the Old Testament.

Commenting on an initial estimate of the number of ethnic minority MPs elected in the 2024 general election published by think tank British Future, academic Maria Sobolewska notes that this estimate defines "ethnic minority" by "Using the 2021 Census primary criterion of ethnic minority as anyone who identifies as other than White".

== Academic research ==
In 2001, Muhammad Anwar of Warwick University wrote a paper titled "The participation of ethnic minorities in British politics" that was published in the Journal of Ethnic and Migration Studies (2001) that in part examined the representation of ethnic minorities at national levels of the British political system. In a chapter in the edited book Race and British Electoral Politics (Routledge, 1998), Andrew Geddes, now Professor of Politics at University of Sheffield, explored the question of "what factors contribute to low levels of ethnic minority representation in the House of Commons".

== Statistics ==
At the 2001 general election, the Parliament of the United Kingdom had twelve ethnic minority Members of Parliament (excluding Jews), and after the 2005 general election; that number increased to fifteen. With the 2010 general election, the Parliament of the United Kingdom reported that the number of ethnic minority MPs increased by nearly three-quarters, to a total of 26. The first three Muslim female MPs were elected. All ethnic minority MPs were either Labour (15) or Conservative (11). In October 2013, the UK Parliament reported that the number of ethnic minority MPs stood at 27, or 4.2% of the total.

After the 2015 general election, 41 MPs from an ethnic minority background were elected to Parliament. 25 of the previous 27 ethnic minority MPs retained their seats and were joined by 16 new ethnic minority MPs. 23 were from the Labour Party, 17 of them were Conservatives and one from the SNP. In the 2017 general election, 52 ethnic minority MPs were elected, including 32 Labour MPs, 19 Conservatives and one Liberal Democrat, according to British Future and the House of Commons Library. In the 2019 general election, this figure rose to 66, with 23 Conservative, 41 Labour and two Liberal Democrat non-white MPs. After the 2024 general election, the House of Commons had 90 ethnic minority MPs according to initial calculations, including 66 from the Labour Party, 15 Conservatives, five Liberal Democrats and four independent MPs.

Based on data from unofficial sources including Operation Black Vote, the House of Commons Library estimated in a research briefing published in September 2022 that there were 55 ethnic minority members of the House of Lords as of September 2022. Of these, 11 were affiliated with the Labour Party, 16 were crossbenchers, 16 were Conservatives, six were Liberal Democrats, and six were unaffiliated.

On 16 March 2024, when Vaughan Gething was elected to lead Welsh Labour, and became First Minister of Wales, it meant that three of the four governments in the United Kingdom were led by ethnic minority leaders as Rishi Sunak and Humza Yousef were concurrently serving as Prime Minister of the United Kingdom and First Minister of Scotland respectively.

== United Kingdom ==
=== Government of the United Kingdom ===
==== Prime Ministers ====
Party	Name	Start	End	Ethnicity	Ref(s)
Conservative	Rishi Sunak	2022	2024	British Indian	

==== Cabinet Ministers from the Commons ====
Party	Name	Portfolio(s)	Start	End	Ethnicity	Ref(s)
Liberal	Henry Herbert	Chief Secretary for Ireland	1857	1858	Black British/White British (Mixed)	
Labour	Paul Boateng	Chief Secretary to the Treasury (attending Cabinet)	2002	2005	Black British/White British (Mixed)	
Conservative	Sajid Javid	Secretary of State for Culture, Media and Sport	2014	2015	British Pakistani	
Conservative	Sajid Javid	Minister for Equalities	2014	2014	British Pakistani	
Conservative	Sajid Javid	Secretary of State for Business, Innovation and Skills	2015	2016	British Pakistani	
Conservative	Sajid Javid	President of the Board of Trade	2015	2016	British Pakistani	
Conservative	Sajid Javid	Secretary of State for Communities and Local Government	2016	2018	British Pakistani	
Conservative	Sajid Javid	Secretary of State for Housing, Communities and Local Government	2018	2018	British Pakistani	
Conservative	Sajid Javid	Secretary of State for the Home Department	2018	2019	British Pakistani	
Conservative	Sajid Javid	Secretary of State for Health and Social Care	2021	2022	British Pakistani	
Conservative	Sajid Javid	Chancellor of the Exchequer	2019	2020	British Pakistani	
Conservative	Priti Patel	Secretary of State for International Development	2016	2017	British Indian	
Conservative	Priti Patel	Secretary of State for the Home Department	2019	2022	British Indian	
Conservative	James Cleverly	Minister without Portfolio (attending Cabinet)	2019	2020	Black British/White British (Mixed)	
Conservative	James Cleverly	Secretary of State for Education	2022	2022	Black British/White British (Mixed)	
Conservative	James Cleverly	Secretary of State for Foreign, Commonwealth and Development Affairs	2022	2023	Black British/White British (Mixed)	
Conservative	James Cleverly	Secretary of State for the Home Department	2023	2024	Black British/White British (Mixed)	
Conservative	Alok Sharma	Secretary of State for International Development	2019	2020	British Indian	
Conservative	Alok Sharma	Secretary of State for Business, Energy and Industrial Strategy	2020	2021	British Indian	
Conservative	Alok Sharma	Minister of State for the Cabinet Office (attending Cabinet)	2020	2022	British Indian	
Conservative	Rishi Sunak	Chief Secretary to the Treasury (attending Cabinet)	2019	2020	British Indian	
Conservative	Rishi Sunak	Chancellor of the Exchequer	2020	2022	British Indian	
Conservative	Suella Braverman	Attorney General for England and Wales (attending Cabinet); Advocate General for Northern Ireland (attending Cabinet)	2020	2021	British Indian	
Conservative	Suella Braverman	Attorney General for England and Wales (attending Cabinet); Advocate General for Northern Ireland (attending Cabinet)	2021	2022	British Indian	
Conservative	Suella Braverman	Secretary of State for the Home Department	2022	2022	British Indian	
Conservative	Suella Braverman	Secretary of State for the Home Department	2022	2023	British Indian	
Conservative	Kwasi Kwarteng	Secretary of State for Business, Energy and Industrial Strategy	2021	2022	Black British	
Conservative	Kwasi Kwarteng	Chancellor of the Exchequer	2022	2022	Black British	
Conservative	Nadhim Zahawi	Secretary of State for Education	2021	2022	British Iraqi	
Conservative	Nadhim Zahawi	Chancellor of the Exchequer	2022	2022	British Iraqi	
Conservative	Nadhim Zahawi	Chancellor of the Duchy of Lancaster	2021	2022	British Iraqi	
Conservative	Nadhim Zahawi	Minister for Intergovernmental Relations	2021	2022	British Iraqi	
Conservative	Nadhim Zahawi	Minister for Equalities	2021	2022	British Iraqi	
Conservative	Nadhim Zahawi	Minister without Portfolio	2022	2023	British Iraqi	
Conservative	Nadhim Zahawi	Chair of the Conservative Party	2022	2023	British Iraqi	
Conservative	Shailesh Vara	Secretary of State for Northern Ireland	2022	2022	British Indian	
Conservative	Kemi Badenoch	Secretary of State for International Trade	2022	2023	Black British	
Conservative	Kemi Badenoch	President of the Board of Trade	2022	2024	Black British	
Conservative	Kemi Badenoch	Minister for Women and Equalities	2022	2024	Black British	
Conservative	Kemi Badenoch	Secretary of State for Business and Trade	2023	2024	Black British	
Conservative	Ranil Jayawardena	Secretary of State for Environment, Food and Rural Affairs	2022	2022	British Sri Lankan	
Conservative	Claire Coutinho	Secretary of State for Energy Security and Net Zero	2023	2024	British Indian	
Labour	David Lammy	Secretary of State for Foreign, Commonwealth and Development Affairs	2024	2025	Black British	
Labour	David Lammy	Deputy Prime Minister	2025	2026	Black British	
Labour	David Lammy	Secretary of State for Justice; Lord Chancellor	2025	2026	Black British	
Labour	Shabana Mahmood	Secretary of State for Justice; Lord Chancellor	2024	2025	British Pakistani	
Labour	Shabana Mahmood	Secretary of State for the Home Department	2025	present	British Pakistani	
Labour	Lisa Nandy	Secretary of State for Culture, Media and Sport	2024	2026	British Bengali/White British (Mixed)	
Labour	Lisa Nandy	Secretary of State for Digital, Culture, Media and Sport	2026	present	British Bengali/White British (Mixed)	
Labour	Miatta Fahnbulleh	Secretary of State for Energy Security and Net Zero	2026	present	Black British	
Labour	Kanishka Narayan	Minister for Artificial Intelligence (attending Cabinet)	2026	present	British Indian	

==== Junior Ministers from the Commons ====
Party	Name	First office	Start	Ethnicity	Ref(s)
Liberal	Ernest Soares	Lord Commissioner of the Treasury	1910	Anglo-Indian	
Conservative	Sebastian Coe	Assistant Government Whip	1996	Anglo-Indian	
Labour	Paul Boateng	Parliamentary Under-Secretary of State for Disabled People	1997	Black British/White British (Mixed)	
Labour	Keith Vaz	Minister of State for Europe	1999	British Indian	
Labour	David Lammy	Parliamentary Under-Secretary of State for Public Health	2002	Black British	
Labour	Parmjit Dhanda	Parliamentary Under-Secretary of State for Education and Skills	2006	British Indian	
Labour	Shahid Malik	Parliamentary Under-Secretary of State for International Development	2007	British Pakistani	
Labour	Sadiq Khan	Parliamentary Under-Secretary of State for Communities and Local Government	2008	British Pakistani	
Conservative	Sajid Javid	Economic Secretary to the Treasury	2012	British Pakistani	
Labour	Dawn Butler	Minister of State for Youth Affairs	2009	Black British	
Conservative	Helen Grant	Parliamentary Under-Secretary of State for Equalities	2012	Black British/White British (Mixed)	
Conservative	Sam Gyimah	Lords Commissioner of the Treasury	2013	Black British	
Conservative	Shailesh Vara	Parliamentary Under-Secretary of State for Courts and Legal Aid	2013	British Indian	
Conservative	Priti Patel	Exchequer Secretary to the Treasury	2014	British Indian	
Conservative	Alok Sharma	Parliamentary Under-Secretary of State for Asia and the Pacific	2016	British Indian	
Conservative	Suella Braverman	Parliamentary Under-Secretary of State for Exiting the European Union	2018	British Indian	
Conservative	Nus Ghani	Parliamentary Under-Secretary of State for Aviation and Maritime	2018	British Pakistani	
Conservative	Rishi Sunak	Parliamentary Under-Secretary of State for Local Government	2018	British Indian	
Conservative	Nadhim Zahawi	Parliamentary Under-Secretary of State for Children and Families	2018	British Iraqi	
Conservative	Kwasi Kwarteng	Parliamentary Under-Secretary of State for Exiting the European Union	2018	Black British	
Conservative	James Cleverly	Parliamentary Under-Secretary of State for Exiting the European Union	2019	Black British/White British (Mixed)	
Conservative	Seema Kennedy	Parliamentary Under-Secretary of State for Public Health and Primary Care	2019	British Iranian/White Irish (Mixed)	
Conservative	Kemi Badenoch	Parliamentary Under-Secretary of State for Children and Families	2019	Black British	
Conservative	Paul Scully	Parliamentary Under-Secretary of State for Small Business, Consumers and Labour Markets	2020	British Burmese	
Conservative	Ranil Jayawardena	Parliamentary Under-Secretary of State International Trade	2020	British Sri Lankan	
Conservative	Alan Mak	Lord Commissioner of the Treasury	2021	British Chinese	
Conservative	Rehman Chishti	Parliamentary Under-Secretary of State for North America, Sanctions and Consular Policy	2022	British Pakistani	
Conservative	Claire Coutinho	Parliamentary Under-Secretary of State for Disabled People	2022	British Indian	
Conservative	Darren Henry	Assistant Government Whip	2022	Black British	
Conservative	Gagan Mohindra	Assistant Government Whip	2023	British Indian	
Conservative	Bim Afolami	Economic Secretary to the Treasury	2023	Black British	
Conservative	Saqib Bhatti	Parliamentary Under-Secretary of State for Tech and the Digital Economy	2023	British Pakistani	
Labour	Rushanara Ali	Parliamentary Under-Secretary of State for Homelessness and Democracy	2024	British Bangladeshi	
Labour	Feryal Clark	Parliamentary Under-Secretary of State for Science, Innovation and Technology	2024	British Kurdish	
Labour	Janet Daby	Parliamentary Under-Secretary of State for Children and Families	2024	Black British	
Labour	Miatta Fahnbulleh	Parliamentary Under-Secretary of State for Energy Consumers	2024	Black British	
Labour	Seema Malhotra	Parliamentary Under-Secretary of State for Migration and Citizenship	2024	British Indian	
Labour	Abena Oppong-Asare	Parliamentary Secretary for the Cabinet Office	2024	Black British	
Labour	Taiwo Owatemi	Lord Commissioner of the Treasury	2024	Black British	
Labour	Tulip Siddiq	Economic Secretary to the Treasury	2024	British Bangladeshi	
Labour	Zubir Ahmed	Parliamentary Under-Secretary of State for Health Innovation and Safety	2025	British Pakistani	
Labour	Nesil Caliskan	Comptroller of the Household	2025	British Cypriot (Turkish)	
Labour	Satvir Kaur	Parliamentary Secretary in the Cabinet Office	2025	British Indian	
Labour	Kanishka Narayan	Parliamentary Under-Secretary of State for AI and Online Safety	2025	British Indian	
Labour Co-op	Preet Gill	Parliamentary Under-Secretary of State for Health Innovation and Safety	2026	British Indian	
Labour	Calvin Bailey	Parliamentary Under-Secretary of State for Veterans and People	2026	Black British/White British (Mixed)	
Labour	Florence Eshalomi	Minister of State for Homelessness, Democracy, Communities and Faith	2026	Black British	
Labour	Uma Kumaran	Parliamentary Under-Secretary of State for Overseas Territories, Caribbean, Global Tech and AI	2026	British Sri Lankans	
Labour	Sarah Owen	Parliamentary Under-Secretary of State for Northern Ireland	2026	British Chinese/White British (Mixed)	
Labour	Harpreet Uppal	Assistant Government Whip	2026	British Indian	

=== House of Commons ===
==== Leader of the Opposition ====
Party	Name	Start	End	Ethnicity
Conservative	Rishi Sunak	2024	2024	British Indian
Conservative	Kemi Badenoch	2024	present	Black British

==== Speaker of the House of Commons ====
Party	Name	Constituency	Start	End	Ethnicity
Conservative	Douglas Clifton Brown	Hexham	1943	1951	Black British/White British (Mixed)

==== Chairman of Ways and Means ====
Party	Name	Constituency	Start	End	Ethnicity
Conservative	Douglas Clifton Brown	Hexham	1943	1943	Black British/White British (Mixed)
Conservative	Nus Ghani	Sussex Weald	2024	present	British Pakistani

==== Members of Parliament ====
Party	Name	Constituency	Start	End	Reason	Ethnicity	Ref(s)
Whig	James Townsend	West Looe	1767	1774	Resigned	Black British/White British (Mixed)	
Whig	James Townsend	Calne	1782	1787	Died in office	Black British/White British (Mixed)	
Whig	Richard Beckford	Bridport (1780–1784); Arundel (1784–1790); Leominster (1790–1796)	1780	1796	Died in office	Black British/White British (Mixed)	
Tory	Ralph Benson	Stafford	1812	1818	Retired	Black British/White British (Mixed)	
Tory	Ralph Benson	Stafford	1826	1830	Retired	Black British/White British (Mixed)	
Tory	John Stewart	Lymington	1832	1847	Defeated	Black British/White British (Mixed)	
Conservative	John Stewart	Lymington	1832	1847	Defeated	Black British/White British (Mixed)	
Whig	Alexander Raphael	County Carlow	1835	1835	Unseated by petition	British Armenian	
Whig	Alexander Raphael	St Albans	1847	1850	Died in office	British Armenian	
Conservative	Charles Martyn	Southampton	1841	1842	Unseated by petition	Anglo-Indian	
Whig	Dyce Sombre	Sudbury	1841	1842	Unseated by petition	Anglo-Indian	
Whig	Henry Yorke	City of York	1841	1848	Committed suicide	Black British/White British (Mixed)	
Liberal	Henry Herbert	County Kerry	1847	1866	Died in office	Black British/White British (Mixed)	
Liberal	Peter McLagan	Linlithgowshire	1865	1893	Resigned	Black British/White British (Mixed)	
Liberal	Henry Herbert	County Kerry	1866	1880	Retired	Black British/White British (Mixed)	
Liberal	Hubert Jerningham	Berwick-upon-Tweed	1881	1885	Retired	Black British/White British (Mixed)	
Liberal	Dadabhai Naoroji	Finsbury Central	1892	1895	Defeated	British Indian	
Conservative	Mancherjee Bhownagree	Bethnal Green North East	1895	1906	Defeated	British Indian	
Liberal	Ernest Soares	Barnstaple	1900	1911	Resigned due to failing health	Anglo-Indian	(Goan)
Liberal	Henry Lynch	Ripon	1906	1910	Defeated	British Armenian/White Irish (Mixed)	
Conservative	Douglas Clifton Brown	Hexham	1918	1923	Defeated	Black British/White British (Mixed)	
Conservative	Douglas Clifton Brown	Hexham	1924	1951	Retired	Black British/White British (Mixed)	
Conservative	Howard Clifton Brown	Newbury	1922	1923	Defeated	Black British/White British (Mixed)	
Conservative	Howard Clifton Brown	Newbury	1924	1945	Retired	Black British/White British (Mixed)	
Labour	Shapurji Saklatvala	Battersea North	1922	1923	Defeated	British Indian	
Communist	Shapurji Saklatvala	Battersea North	1924	1929	Defeated	British Indian	
Conservative	Richard Hickmet	Glanford and Scunthorpe	1983	1987	Defeated	British Turkish/White British (Mixed race)	
Conservative	Jonathan Sayeed	Bristol East	1983	1992	Defeated	Anglo-Indian	
Conservative	Jonathan Sayeed	Mid Bedfordshire	1997	2005	Retired	Anglo-Indian	
Labour	Diane Abbott	Hackney North and Stoke Newington	1987	present	Serving	Black British	
Labour	Paul Boateng	Brent South	1987	2005	Retired	Black British/White British (Mixed)	
Labour	Bernie Grant	Tottenham	1987	2000	Died in office	Black British	
Labour	Keith Vaz	Leicester East	1987	2019	Retired	British Indian	
Labour	Ashok Kumar	Langbaurgh	1991	1992	Defeated	British Indian	
Labour	Ashok Kumar	Middlesbrough South and East Cleveland	1997	2010	Died in office	British Indian	
Conservative	Sebastian Coe	Falmouth and Camborne	1992	1997	Defeated	Anglo-Indian	
Conservative	Nirj Deva	Brentford and Isleworth	1992	1997	Defeated	British Sri Lankan	
Labour	Piara Khabra	Ealing Southall	1992	2007	Died in office	British Indian	
Labour	Oona King	Bethnal Green and Bow	1997	2005	Defeated	African American/White British (Mixed)	
Labour	Mohammad Sarwar	Glasgow Central	1997	2010	Retired	British Pakistani	
Labour	Marsha Singh	Bradford West	1997	2012	Resigned due to failing health	British Indian	
Labour Co-op	Mark Hendrick	Preston	2000	present	Serving	Somali/White British (Mixed)	
Labour	David Lammy	Tottenham	2000	present	Serving	Black British	
Labour	Parmjit Dhanda	Gloucester	2001	2010	Defeated	British Indian	
Labour	Khalid Mahmood	Birmingham Perry Barr	2001	2024	Defeated	British Pakistani	
Liberal Democrats	Parmjit Gill	Leicester South	2004	2005	Defeated	British Indian	
Conservative	Adam Afriyie	Windsor	2005	2024	Retired	Black British/White British (Mixed)	
Labour	Dawn Butler	Brent South	2005	2010	Defeated	Black British	
Labour	Dawn Butler	Brent Central	2015	present	Serving	Black British	
Labour	Sadiq Khan	Tooting	2005	2016	Resigned to become Mayor of London	British Pakistani	
Labour	Shahid Malik	Dewsbury	2005	2010	Defeated	British Pakistani	
Conservative	Shailesh Vara	North West Cambridgeshire	2005	2024	Defeated	British Indian	
Labour	Virendra Sharma	Ealing Southall	2007	2024	Retired	British Indian	
Labour	Rushanara Ali	Bethnal Green and Bow (2010–2024); Bethnal Green and Stepney (2024–present)	2010	present	Serving	British Bangladeshi	
Conservative	Rehman Chishti	Gillingham and Rainham	2010	2024	Defeated	British Pakistani	
Conservative	Helen Grant	Maidstone and The Weald (2010–2024); Maidstone and Malling (2024–present)	2010	present	Serving	Black British/White British (Mixed)	
Conservative	Sam Gyimah	East Surrey	2010	2019	Expelled from Conservatives, joined Liberal Democrats	Black British	
Liberal Democrats	Sam Gyimah	East Surrey	2019	2019	Defeated	Black British	
Conservative	Sajid Javid	Bromsgrove	2010	2024	Retired	British Pakistani	
Conservative	Kwasi Kwarteng	Spelthorne	2010	2024	Retired	Black British	
Labour	Shabana Mahmood	Birmingham Ladywood	2010	present	Serving	British Pakistani	
Labour	Lisa Nandy	Wigan	2010	present	Serving	British Bengali/White British (Mixed)	
Labour	Chi Onwurah	Newcastle upon Tyne Central	2010	present	Serving	Black British/White British (Mixed)	
Conservative	Priti Patel	Witham	2010	present	Serving	British Indian	
Labour	Yasmin Qureshi	Bolton South East (2010–2024); Bolton South and Walkden (2024–present)	2010	present	Serving	British Pakistani	
Labour	Anas Sarwar	Glasgow Central	2010	2015	Defeated	British Pakistani	
Conservative	Alok Sharma	Reading West	2010	2024	Retired	British Indian	
Labour	Chuka Umunna	Streatham	2010	2019	Resigned from Labour, joined Change UK	Black British/White British/White Irish (Mixed)	
Change UK	Chuka Umunna	Streatham	2019	2019	Resigned from Change UK, joined Liberal Democrats	Black British/White British/White Irish (Mixed)	
Liberal Democrats	Chuka Umunna	Streatham	2019	2019	Defeated	Black British/White British/White Irish (Mixed)	
Conservative	Paul Uppal	Wolverhampton South West	2010	2015	Defeated	British Indian	
Labour	Valerie Vaz	Walsall South (2010–2024); Walsall and Bloxwich (2024–present)	2010	present	Serving	British Indian	
Conservative	Nadhim Zahawi	Stratford-on-Avon	2010	2024	Retired	British Iraqi	
Labour Co-op	Seema Malhotra	Feltham and Heston	2011	present	Serving	British Indian	
SNP	Tasmina Ahmed-Sheikh	Ochil and South Perthshire	2015	2017	Defeated	British Pakistani/White British/Other White (Mixed)	
Conservative	Suella Braverman	Fareham (2015–2024); Fareham and Waterlooville (2024–present)	2015	2026	Left Conservative Party, joined Reform UK	British Indian	
Reform	Suella Braverman	Fareham (2015–2024); Fareham and Waterlooville (2024–present)	2026	present	Serving	British Indian	
Conservative	James Cleverly	Braintree	2015	present	Serving	Black British/White British (Mixed)	
Labour	Thangam Debbonaire	Bristol West	2015	2024	Defeated	Anglo-Indian	
Conservative	Nus Ghani	Wealden (2015–2024); Sussex Weald (2024–present)	2015	present	Serving	British Pakistani	
Labour	Imran Hussain	Bradford East	2015	present	Serving	British Pakistani	
Labour	Rupa Huq	Ealing Central and Acton	2015	present	Serving	British Bangladeshi	
Conservative	Ranil Jayawardena	North East Hampshire	2015	2024	Defeated	British Sri Lankan	
Conservative	Seema Kennedy	South Ribble	2015	2019	Retired	British Iranian/White Irish (Mixed)	
Labour	Clive Lewis	Norwich South	2015	present	Serving	Black British/White British (Mixed)	
Conservative	Alan Mak	Havant	2015	present	Serving	British Chinese	
Labour Co-op	Kate Osamor	Edmonton (2015–2024); Edmonton and Winchmore Hill (2024–present)	2015	present	Serving	Black British	
Conservative	Paul Scully	Sutton and Cheam	2015	2024	Retired	British Burmese	
Labour	Naz Shah	Bradford West	2015	present	Serving	British Pakistani	
Labour	Tulip Siddiq	Hampstead and Kilburn (2015–2024); Hampstead and Highgate (2024–present)	2015	present	Serving	British Bangladeshi	
Conservative	Rishi Sunak	Richmond (2015–2024); Richmond and Northallerton (2024–present)	2015	present	Serving	British Indian	
Labour	Rosena Allin-Khan	Tooting	2016	present	Serving	British Pakistani/Other White (Mixed)	
Conservative	Bim Afolami	Hitchin and Harpenden	2017	2024	Defeated	Black British	
Conservative	Kemi Badenoch	Saffron Walden (2017–2024); North West Essex (2024–present)	2017	present	Serving	Black British	
Labour	Bambos Charalambous	Enfield Southgate (2017–2024); Southgate and Wood Green (2024–present)	2017	present	Serving	British Cypriot	
Labour	Marsha de Cordova	Battersea	2017	present	Serving	Black British	
Labour	Tan Dhesi	Slough	2017	present	Serving	British Indian	
Labour Co-op	Preet Gill	Birmingham Edgbaston	2017	present	Serving	British Indian	
Labour	Afzal Khan	Manchester Gorton (2017–2024); Manchester Rusholme (2024–present)	2017	present	Serving	British Pakistani	
Liberal Democrats	Layla Moran	Oxford West and Abingdon	2017	present	Serving	British Palestinian/White British (Mixed)	
Labour	Fiona Onasanya	Peterborough	2017	2018	Expelled from Labour, became an independent	Black British	
Independent	Fiona Onasanya	Peterborough	2018	2019	Removed from office	Black British	
Labour	Faisal Rashid	Warrington South	2017	2019	Defeated	British Pakistani	
Labour	Eleanor Smith	Wolverhampton South West	2017	2019	Defeated	Black British	
Labour	Mohammad Yasin	Bedford	2017	present	Serving	British Pakistani	
Labour	Janet Daby	Lewisham East	2018	present	Serving	Black British	
Conservative	Imran Ahmad Khan	Wakefield	2019	2021	Suspended and later expelled from Conservatives, became an independent	British Pakistani/White British (Mixed)	
Independent	Imran Ahmad Khan	Wakefield	2021	2022	Resigned	British Pakistani/White British (Mixed)	
Labour	Tahir Ali	Birmingham Hall Green (2019–2024); Hall Green and Moseley (2024–present)	2019	present	Serving	British Pakistani	
Labour	Apsana Begum	Poplar and Limehouse	2019	present	Serving	British Bangladeshi	
Conservative	Saqib Bhatti	Meriden (2019–2024); Meriden and Solihull East (2024–present)	2019	present	Serving	British Pakistani	
Labour	Feryal Clark	Enfield North	2019	present	Serving	British Kurdish	
Conservative	Claire Coutinho	East Surrey	2019	present	Serving	British Indian	
Labour Co-op	Flo Eshalomi	Vauxhall (2019–2024); Vauxhall and Camberwell Green (2024–present)	2019	present	Serving	Black British	
Conservative	Darren Henry	Broxtowe	2019	2024	Defeated	Black British	
Labour	Kim Johnson	Liverpool Riverside	2019	present	Serving	Black British/White British (Mixed)	
Labour	Nav Mishra	Stockport	2019	present	Serving	British Indian	
Conservative	Gagan Mohindra	South West Hertfordshire	2019	present	Serving	British Indian	
Labour	Abena Oppong-Asare	Erith and Thamesmead	2019	present	Serving	Black British	
Labour	Taiwo Owatemi	Coventry North West	2019	present	Serving	Black British	
Labour	Sarah Owen	Luton North	2019	present	Serving	British Chinese/White British (Mixed)	
Labour	Bell Ribeiro-Addy	Streatham (2019–2024); Clapham and Brixton Hill (2024–present)	2019	present	Serving	Black British	
Labour	Zarah Sultana	Coventry South	2019	2025	Resigned from Labour, became an independent	British Pakistani	
Independent	Zarah Sultana	Coventry South	2025	2025	Joined Your Party	British Pakistani	
Your	Zarah Sultana	Coventry South	2025	present	Serving	British Pakistani	
Liberal Democrats	Munira Wilson	Twickenham	2019	present	Serving	British Indian	
Labour	Nadia Whittome	Nottingham East	2019	present	Serving	Anglo-Indian	
Labour	Claudia Webbe	Leicester East	2019	2020	Suspended and later expelled from Labour, became an independent	Black British	
Independent	Claudia Webbe	Leicester East	2020	2024	Defeated	Black British	
SNP	Anum Qaisar	Airdrie and Shotts	2021	2024	Defeated	British Pakistani	
Labour	Paulette Hamilton	Birmingham Erdington	2022	present	Serving	Black British	
Independent	Shockat Adam	Leicester South	2024	present	Serving	British Indian	
Labour	Zubir Ahmed	Glasgow South West	2024	present	Serving	British Pakistani	
Labour	Sadik Al-Hassan	North Somerset	2024	present	Serving	British Syrian/White Irish (Mixed)	
Labour	Bayo Alaba	Southend East and Rochford	2024	present	Serving	Black British	
Labour	Callum Anderson	Buckingham and Bletchley	2024	present	Serving	Black British/White British (Mixed)	
Labour	Jas Athwal	Ilford South	2024	present	Serving	British Indian	
Liberal Democrats	Josh Babarinde	Eastbourne	2024	present	Serving	Black British/White British (Mixed)	
Labour	Calvin Bailey	Leyton and Wanstead	2024	present	Serving	Black British/White British (Mixed)	
Conservative	Peter Bedford	Mid Leicestershire	2024	present	Serving	Anglo-Indian	
Labour	Sureena Brackenridge	Wolverhampton North East	2024	present	Serving	British Indian	
Labour	David Burton-Sampson	Southend West and Leigh	2024	present	Serving	Black British/White British (Mixed)	
Labour	Nesil Caliskan	Barking	2024	present	Serving	British Cypriot (Turkish)	
Labour	Juliet Campbell	Broxtowe	2024	present	Serving	Black British	
Liberal Democrats	Victoria Collins	Harpenden and Berkhamsted	2024	present	Serving	British Chinese/White British (Mixed)	
Labour	Kirith Entwistle	Bolton North East	2024	present	Serving	British Indian	
Labour	Miatta Fahnbulleh	Peckham	2024	present	Serving	Black British	
Independent	Adnan Hussain	Blackburn	2024	present	Serving	British Pakistani	
Labour	Natasha Irons	Croydon East	2024	present	Serving	Black British/White British (Mixed)	
Labour	Adam Jogee	Newcastle-under-Lyme	2024	present	Serving	Black British/White British (Mixed)	
Labour	Sojan Joseph	Ashford	2024	present	Serving	British Indian	
Labour	Gurinder Josan	Smethwick	2024	present	Serving	British Indian	
Labour	Warinder Juss	Wolverhampton West	2024	present	Serving	British Indian	
Labour	Satvir Kaur	Southampton Test	2024	present	Serving	British Indian	
Independent	Ayoub Khan	Birmingham Perry Barr	2024	present	Serving	British Pakistani	
Labour	Naushabah Khan	Gillingham and Rainham	2024	present	Serving	British Pakistani	
Labour	Sonia Kumar	Dudley	2024	present	Serving	British Indian	
Labour	Uma Kumaran	Stratford and Bow	2024	present	Serving	British Sri Lankan	
Labour	Abtisam Mohamed	Sheffield Central	2024	present	Serving	British Yemeni	
Independent	Iqbal Mohamed	Dewsbury and Batley	2024	present	Serving	British Indian	
Labour	Kanishka Narayan	Vale of Glamorgan	2024	present	Serving	British Indian	
Conservative	Ben Obese-Jecty	Huntingdon	2024	present	Serving	Black British/White British (Mixed)	
Conservative	Shivani Raja	Leicester East	2024	present	Serving	British Indian	
Labour	Jeevun Sandher	Loughborough	2024	present	Serving	British Indian	
Labour	Baggy Shanker	Derby South	2024	present	Serving	British Indian	
Conservative	Neil Shastri-Hurst	Solihull West and Shirley	2024	present	Serving	Anglo-Indian	
Labour	Harpreet Uppal	Huddersfield	2024	present	Serving	British Indian	
Labour	Tony Vaughan	Folkestone and Hythe	2024	present	Serving	British Filipino/White British (Mixed)	
Labour	Yuan Yang	Earley and Woodley	2024	present	Serving	British Chinese	
Labour	Sagal Abdi-Wali	Holborn and St Pancras	2026	present	Serving	British Somali	

=== House of Lords ===
==== Cabinet Ministers from the Lords ====
Party	Name	Portfolio(s)	Start	End	Ethnicity	Ref(s)
Labour	Valerie Amos, Baroness Amos	Secretary of State for International Development	2003	2003	Black British	
Labour	Valerie Amos, Baroness Amos	Leader of the House of Lords	2003	2007	Black British	
Labour	Valerie Amos, Baroness Amos	Lord President of the Council	2003	2007	Black British	
Labour	Patricia Scotland, Baroness Scotland	Attorney General for England and Wales (attending Cabinet)	2007	2010	Black British	
Labour	Patricia Scotland, Baroness Scotland	Advocate General for Northern Ireland (attending Cabinet)	2010	2010	Black British	
Conservative	Sayeeda Warsi, Baroness Warsi	Chair of the Conservative Party	2010	2012	British Pakistani	
Conservative	Sayeeda Warsi, Baroness Warsi	Minister without Portfolio	2010	2012	British Pakistani	
Conservative	Sayeeda Warsi, Baroness Warsi	Senior Minister of State for Foreign and Commonwealth Affairs (attending Cabinet)	2012	2014	British Pakistani	
Conservative	Sayeeda Warsi, Baroness Warsi	Minister of State for Faith and Communities (attending Cabinet)	2012	2014	British Pakistani	

==== Junior Ministers from the Lords ====
Party	Name	First office	Start	Ethnicity	Ref(s)
Liberal	Satyendra Sinha, 1st Baron Sinha	Under-Secretary of State for India	1919	British Indian	
Labour	Valerie Amos, Baroness Amos	Baroness-in-Waiting	1998	Black British	
Labour	Patricia Scotland, Baroness Scotland	Parliamentary Under-Secretary of State for Foreign and Commonwealth Affairs	1999	Black British	
Labour	Ara Darzi, Baron Darzi of Denham	Parliamentary Under-Secretary of State for Health	2007	British Armenian	
Labour	Shriti Vadera, Baroness Vadera	Parliamentary Under-Secretary of State for International Development	2007	British Indian	
Labour	Kamlesh Patel, Baron Patel of Bradford	Lord-in-waiting	2008	British Indian	
Conservative	Sandip Verma, Baroness Verma	Baroness-in-waiting	2010	British Indian	
Conservative	Tariq Ahmad, Baron Ahmad of Wimbledon	Lord-in-waiting	2012	British Pakistani	
Conservative	Dolar Popat, Baron Popat	Lord-in-waiting	2013	British Indian	
Conservative	Nosheena Mobarik, Baroness Mobarik	Baroness-in-waiting	2016	British Pakistani	
Conservative	Zahida Manzoor, Baroness Manzoor	Baroness-in-waiting	2018	British Pakistani	
Conservative	Syed Kamall, Baron Kamall	Parliamentary Under-Secretary of State for Technology, Innovation and Life Sciences	2021	British Indian	
Labour	Wajid Khan, Baron Khan of Burnley	Parliamentary Under-Secretary of State for Faith, Communities and Resettlement	2024	British Pakistani	
Labour	Sonny Leong, Baron Leong	Lord-in-waiting	2024	British Chinese	
Labour	Claude Moraes, Baron Moraes	Lord-in-waiting	2025	British Indian	
Labour	Gerard Lemos, Baron Lemos	Lord-in-waiting	2025	British Indian	
Labour	Brenda Dacres, Baroness Dacres of Lewisham	Baroness-in-waiting	2026	Black British	
Labour	Anas Sarwar, Baron Sarwar	Minister of State for Trade	2026	British Pakistani	

==== Members of the House of Lords ====
Party	Name	Start	End	Reason	Ethnicity	Type	Ref(s)
Liberal	Satyendra Sinha, 1st Baron Sinha	1919	1928	Died	British Indian	Hereditary	
Liberal	Arun Sinha, 2nd Baron Sinha	1945	1967	Died	British Indian	Hereditary	
Conservative	Douglas Clifton Brown, 1st Viscount Ruffside	1951	1958	Died	Black British/White British (Mixed)	Hereditary	
Crossbench	Sudhindra Sinha, 3rd Baron Sinha	1969	1989	Died	British Indian	Hereditary	
Crossbench	Learie Constantine, Baron Constantine	1969	1971	Died	Black British	Life	
Labour	David Pitt, Baron Pitt of Hampstead	1975	1994	Died	Black British	Life	
Crossbench	Pratap Chitnis, Baron Chitnis	1977	2013	Died	British Indian	Life	
Crossbench	Sushanta Sinha, 4th Baron Sinha	1989	1992	Died	British Indian	Hereditary	
Conservative	Shreela Flather, Baroness Flather	1990	2008	Resigned from the Conservative Party, now a Crossbencher	British Indian	Life	
Crossbench	Shreela Flather, Baroness Flather	2008	2024	Died	British Indian	Life	
Crossbench	Lydia Dunn, Baroness Dunn	1990	2010	Removed for non-dom status	British Chinese	Life	
Labour	Meghnad Desai, Baron Desai	1991	2020	Resigned from the Labour Party, now a Crossbencher	British Indian	Life	
Crossbench	Meghnad Desai, Baron Desai	2020	2025	Died	British Indian	Life	
Crossbench	Anindo Sinha, 5th Baron Sinha	1992	1999	Died	British Indian	Hereditary	
Lords Spiritual	Michael Nazir-Ali, Bishop of Rochester	1994	2009	Retired	British Pakistani	Spiritual	
Crossbench	James Lindsay, 3rd Baron Lindsay of Birker	1995	1999	Removed by the House of Lords Act 1999	British Chinese/White British (Mixed)	Hereditary	
Conservative	John Taylor, Baron Taylor of Warwick	1996	2011	Suspended till 2012 for having been jailed due to United Kingdom Parliamentary expenses scandal. Resigned from the Conservative Party, now a Crossbencher.	Black British	Life	
Crossbench	John Taylor, Baron Taylor of Warwick	2011	present	Serving	Black British	Life	
Labour	Swraj Paul, Baron Paul	1996	2010	Resigned from the Labour Party, now a Crossbencher	British Indian	Life	
Crossbench	Swraj Paul, Baron Paul	2010	2025	Died	British Indian	Life	
Conservative	Raj Bagri, Baron Bagri	1997	2010	Removed for non-dom status	British Indian	Life	
Labour	Valerie Amos, Baroness Amos	1997	present	Serving	Black British	Life	
Labour	Patricia Scotland, Baroness Scotland of Asthal	1997	present	Serving	Black British	Life	
Liberal Democrats	Navnit Dholakia, Baron Dholakia	1997	present	Serving	British Indian	Life	
Labour	Waheed Alli, Baron Alli	1998	present	Serving	British Pakistani	Life	
Labour	Pola Uddin, Baroness Uddin	1998	2010	Resigned from the Labour Party, now a Crossbencher	British Bangladeshi	Life	
Crossbench	Pola Uddin, Baroness Uddin	2010	present	Serving	British Bangladeshi	Life	
Labour	Nazir Ahmed, Baron Ahmed	1998	2007	Suspended from Labour in 2007 and expelled in 2009, became a Crossbencher	British Pakistani	Life	
Crossbench	Nazir Ahmed, Baron Ahmed	2007	2020	Resigned under threat of expulsion	British Pakistani	Life	
Crossbench	Arup Sinha, 6th Baron Sinha	1999	1999	Removed by the House of Lords Act 1999	British Indian	Hereditary	
Labour	Tarsem King, Baron King of West Bromwich	1999	2013	Died	British Indian	Life	
Crossbench	Usha Prashar, Baroness Prashar	1999	present	Serving	British Indian	Life	
Crossbench	Narendra Patel, Baron Patel	1999	present	Serving	British Indian	Life	
Labour	Rosalind Howells, Baroness Howells of St Davids	1999	2019	Retired	Black British	Life	
Conservative	Sebastian Coe, Baron Coe	2000	2022	Retired	Anglo-Indian	Life	
Labour	Bhikhu Parekh, Baron Parekh	2000	present	Serving	British Indian	Life	
Labour	Adam Patel, Baron Patel of Blackburn	2000	2019	Died	British Indian	Life	
Crossbench	Herman Ouseley, Baron Ouseley	2001	2019	Retired	Black British	Life	
Crossbench	Victor Adebowale, Baron Adebowale	2001	present	Serving	Black British	Life	
Labour	Amir Bhatia, Baron Bhatia	2001	2010	Resigned from the Labour Party, now a Crossbencher	British Indian	Life	
Crossbench	Amir Bhatia, Baron Bhatia	2010	2023	Removed for non-attendance	British Indian	Life	
Crossbench	Michael Chan, Baron Chan	2001	2006	Died	British Chinese	Life	
Lords Spiritual	John Sentamu, Baron Sentamu	2002	2020	Retired as Archbishop of York, created a life peer in 2021	Black British	Spiritual	
Crossbench	John Sentamu, Baron Sentamu	2021	present	Serving	Black British	Life	
Labour	Kumar Bhattacharyya, Baron Bhattacharyya	2004	2019	Died	British Indian	Life	
Crossbench	Diljit Rana, Baron Rana	2004	2016	Resigned from the Crossbenches, now a Conservative	British Indian	Life	
Conservative	Diljit Rana, Baron Rana	2016	2024	Retired	British Indian	Life	
Crossbench	Lola Young, Baroness Young of Hornsey	2004	present	Serving	Black British	Life	
Liberal Democrats	Kishwer Falkner, Baroness Falkner of Margravine	2004	2019	Resigned from the Liberal Democrats, now a Crossbencher	British Pakistani	Life	
Crossbench	Kishwer Falkner, Baroness Falkner of Margravine	2019	present	Serving	British Pakistani	Life	
Crossbench	Michael Hastings, Baron Hastings of Scarisbrick	2005	present	Serving	Black British	Life	
Conservative	Sandip Verma, Baroness Verma	2006	present	Serving	British Indian	Life	
Conservative	Mohamed Sheikh, Baron Sheikh	2006	2022	Died	British Indian	Life	
Crossbench	Karan Bilimoria, Baron Bilimoria	2006	present	Serving	British Indian	Life	
Labour	Kamlesh Patel, Baron Patel of Bradford	2006	present	Serving	British Indian	Life	
Labour	Bill Morris, Baron Morris of Handsworth	2006	2020	Retired	Black British	Life	
Labour	Shriti Vadera, Baroness Vadera	2007	present	Serving	British Indian	Life	
Crossbench	Khalid Hameed, Baron Hameed	2007	present	Serving	British Indian	Life	
Labour	Ara Darzi, Baron Darzi of Denham	2007	2019	Resigned from the Labour Party, now a Crossbencher	British Armenian	Life	
Crossbench	Ara Darzi, Baron Darzi of Denham	2019	present	Serving	British Armenian	Life	
Conservative	Sayeeda Warsi, Baroness Warsi	2007	present	Serving	British Pakistani	Life	
Crossbench	Haleh Afshar, Baroness Afshar	2007	2022	Died	British Iranian	Life	
Liberal Democrats	Meral Hussein-Ece, Baroness Hussein-Ece	2010	present	Serving	British Turkish	Life	
Crossbench	Ajay Kakkar, Baron Kakkar	2010	present	Serving	British Indian	Life	
Conservative	Nat Wei, Baron Wei	2010	present	Serving	British Chinese	Life	
Liberal Democrats	Floella Benjamin, Baroness Benjamin	2010	present	Serving	Black British	Life	
Labour	Paul Boateng, Baron Boateng	2010	present	Serving	Black British/White British (Mixed)	Life	
Conservative	Dolar Popat, Baron Popat	2010	present	Serving	British Indian	Life	
Conservative	Bernard Ribeiro, Baron Ribeiro	2010	2023	Retired	Black British	Life	
Conservative	Tariq Ahmad, Baron Ahmad of Wimbledon	2011	present	Serving	British Pakistani	Life	
Liberal Democrats	Qurban Hussain, Baron Hussain	2011	present	Serving	British Pakistani	Life	
Labour	Oona King, Baroness King of Bow	2011	2024	Retired	African American/White British (Mixed)	Life	
Liberal Democrats	Raj Loomba, Baron Loomba	2011	2016	Resigned from the Liberal Democrats, now a Crossbencher	British Indian	Life	
Crossbench	Raj Loomba, Baron Loomba	2016	present	Serving	British Indian	Life	
Labour	Gulam Noon, Baron Noon	2011	2015	Died	British Indian	Life	
Crossbench	Indarjit Singh, Baron Singh of Wimbledon	2011	present	Serving	British Indian	Life	
Liberal Democrats	Zahida Manzoor, Baroness Manzoor	2013	2016	Resigned from the Liberal Democrats, now a Conservative	British Pakistani	Life	
Conservative	Zahida Manzoor, Baroness Manzoor	2016	present	Serving	British Pakistani	Life	
Liberal Democrats	Rumi Verjee, Baron Verjee	2013	present	Serving	British Indian	Life	
Labour	Doreen Lawrence, Baroness Lawrence of Clarendon	2013	present	Serving	Black British	Life	
Conservative	Ranbir Suri, Baron Suri	2014	present	Serving	British Indian	Life	
Conservative	Nosheena Mobarik, Baroness Mobarik	2014	present	Serving	British Pakistani	Life	
Conservative	Ruby McGregor-Smith, Baroness McGregor-Smith	2015	2024	Changed affiliation to non-affiliated	British Indian	Life	
Non-affiliated	Ruby McGregor-Smith, Baroness McGregor-Smith	2024	present	Serving	British Indian	Life	
Liberal Democrats	Shas Sheehan, Baroness Sheehan	2015	present	Serving	British Pakistani	Life	
Conservative	Jitesh Gadhia, Baron Gadhia	2016	present	Serving	British Indian	Life	
Labour	Shami Chakrabarti, Baroness Chakrabarti	2016	present	Serving	British Indian	Life	
Labour	Martha Osamor, Baroness Osamor	2018	present	Serving	Black British	Life	
Conservative	Zameer Choudrey, Baron Choudrey	2019	present	Serving	British Pakistani	Life	
Conservative	Rami Ranger, Baron Ranger	2019	present	Serving	British Indian	Life	
Crossbench	Simon Woolley, Baron Woolley of Woodford	2019	present	Serving	Black British	Life	
Crossbench	Minouche Shafik, Baroness Shafik	2020	present	Serving	British Egyptian	Life	
Conservative	Aamer Sarfraz, Baron Sarfraz	2020	present	Serving	British Pakistani	Life	
Conservative	Syed Kamall, Baron Kamall	2021	present	Serving	British Indian	Life	
Labour	Wajid Khan, Baron Khan of Burnley	2021	present	Serving	British Pakistani	Life	
Labour	Prem Sikka, Baron Sikka	2021	present	Serving	British Indian	Life	
Lords Spiritual	Guli Francis-Dehqani, Bishop of Chelmsford	2021	present	Serving	British Iranian/White British (Mixed)	Spiritual	
Crossbench	Shaista Gohir, Baroness Gohir	2022	present	Serving	British Pakistani	Life	
Labour	Sonny Leong, Baron Leong	2022	present	Serving	British Chinese	Life	
Conservative	Dambisa Moyo, Baroness Moyo	2022	2024	Changed affiliation to non-affiliated	Black British	Life	
Non-affiliated	Dambisa Moyo, Baroness Moyo	2024	present	Serving	Black British	Life	
Conservative	Tony Sewell, Baron Sewell of Sanderstead	2022	present	Serving	Black British	Life	
Labour	Kuldip Sahota, Baron Sahota	2022	present	Serving	British Indian	Life	
Conservative	Shaun Bailey, Baron Bailey of Paddington	2023	present	Serving	Black British	Life	
Conservative	Kulveer Ranger, Baron Ranger of Northwood	2023	present	Serving	British Indian	Life	
Labour	Ayesha Hazarika, Baroness Hazarika	2024	present	Serving	British Indian	Life	
Conservative	Alok Sharma, Baron Sharma	2024	present	Serving	British Indian	Life	
Labour	Thangam Debbonaire, Baroness Debbonaire	2025	present	Serving	Anglo-Indian	Life	
Labour	Gerard Lemos, Baron Lemos	2025	present	Serving	British Indian	Life	
Liberal Democrats	Shaffaq Mohammed, Baron Mohammed of Tinsley	2025	present	Serving	British Pakistani	Life	
Labour	Claude Moraes, Baron Moraes	2025	present	Serving	British Indian	Life	
Labour	Krish Raval, Baron Raval	2025	present	Serving	British Indian	Life	
Labour	Marvin Rees, Baron Rees of Easton	2025	present	Serving	Black British/White British (Mixed)	Life	
Crossbench	Sharon White, Baroness White of Tufnell Park	2025	present	Serving	Black British	Life	
Labour	Peter Babudu, Baron Babudu	2026	present	Serving	Black British	Life	
Labour	Farmida Bi, Baroness Bi	2026	present	Serving	British Pakistani	Life	
Labour Co-op	Brenda Dacres, Baroness Dacres of Lewisham	2026	present	Serving	Black British	Life	
Labour	Neena Gill, Baroness Gill	2026	present	Serving	British Indian	Life	
Labour	Geeta Nargund, Baroness Nargund	2026	present	Serving	British Indian	Life	
Labour	Uday Nagaraju, Baron Nagaraju	2026	present	Serving	British Indian	Life	
Labour	Shama Tatler, Baroness Shah	2026	present	Serving	British Pakistani	Life	
Labour	Parvais Jabbar, Baron Jabbar	2026	present	Serving	British Iraqis	Life	
Labour	Alison Lowe, Baroness Lowe of Armley	2026	present	Serving	Black British/White Irish (Mixed)	Life	
Conservative	Swaran Singh, Baron Singh of Solihull	2026	present	Serving	British Indian	Life	
Labour	Sadiq Khan, Baron Khan of Tooting	2026	present	Serving	British Pakistani	Life	
Labour	June Sarpong, Baroness Sarpong	2026	present	Serving	Black British	Life	
Labour	Anas Sarwar, Baron Sarwar	2026	present	Serving	British Pakistani	Life	
Labour	Barbara Mills, Baroness Mills of Greenwich	2026	present	Serving	Black British	Life	

=== UK Party Leaders ===
Party	Name	Start	End	Ethnicity
Conservative	Rishi Sunak	2022	2024	British Indian
Conservative	Kemi Badenoch	2024	present	Black British

== European Union ==
=== Members of the European Parliament ===
Party	Name	Constituency	Start	End	Reason	Ethnicity	Ref(s)
Labour	Mark Hendrick	Central Lancashire	1994	1999	Defeated	British Somali/White British (Mixed)	
Conservative	Nirj Deva	South East England	1999	2019	Defeated	British Sri Lankan	
Labour	Neena Gill	West Midlands	1999	2009	Defeated	British Indian	
Labour	Neena Gill	West Midlands	2014	2020	UK exited the EU	British Indian	
Conservative	Bashir Khanbhai	East of England	1999	2004	Retired	British Indian	
Labour	Claude Moraes	London	1999	2020	UK exited the EU	British Indian	
Liberal Democrats	Sajjad Karim	North West England	2004	2006	Left Liberal Democrats, joined Conservative Party	British Pakistani	
Conservative	Sajjad Karim	North West England	2006	2019	Defeated	British Pakistani	
Conservative	Syed Kamall	London	2005	2019	Defeated	British Indian	
UKIP	Amjad Bashir	Yorkshire and the Humber	2014	2015	Left UKIP, joined Conservative Party	British Pakistani	
Conservative	Amjad Bashir	Yorkshire and the Humber	2015	2019	Defeated	British Pakistani	
Labour	Afzal Khan	North West England	2014	2017	Resigned to become Member of Parliament for Manchester Gorton	British Pakistani	
UKIP	Steven Woolfe	North West England	2014	2016	Left UKIP, became an independent	Black British/White British (Mixed)	
Independent	Steven Woolfe	North West England	2016	2018	Joined Conservative Party	Black British/White British (Mixed)	
Conservative	Steven Woolfe	North West England	2018	2019	Retired	Black British/White British (Mixed)	
Labour	Wajid Khan	North West England	2017	2019	Defeated	British Pakistani	
Conservative	Nosheena Mobarik	Scotland	2017	2020	UK exited the EU	British Pakistani	
Liberal Democrats	Dinesh Dhamija	London	2019	2020	UK exited the EU	British Indian	
Brexit Party	Benyamin Habib	London	2019	2020	UK exited the EU	British Pakistani	
Brexit Party	Christina Jordan	South West England	2019	2020	UK exited the EU	British Malaysian	
Green	Magid Magid	Yorkshire and the Humber	2019	2020	UK exited the EU	British Somali	
Liberal Democrats	Shaffaq Mohammed	Yorkshire and the Humber	2019	2020	UK exited the EU	British Pakistani	
Brexit Party	Louis Stedman-Bryce	Scotland	2019	2019	Resigned from the Brexit Party	Black British/White British (Mixed)	
Independent	Louis Stedman-Bryce	Scotland	2019	2020	UK exited the EU	Black British/White British (Mixed)	

=== European Party Leaders ===
Party	Name	Start	End	Ethnicity
Conservative	Syed Kamall	2013	2014	British Indian

== Scotland ==
=== Scottish Government ===
==== First Ministers of Scotland ====
Party	Name	Start	End	Ethnicity	Ref(s)
SNP	Humza Yousaf	2023	2024	British Pakistani	

==== Scottish Government Cabinet Ministers ====
Party	Name	Portfolio(s)	Start	End	Ethnicity	Ref(s)
SNP	Humza Yousaf	Justice	2018	2021	British Pakistani	
SNP	Humza Yousaf	Health and Social Care	2021	2023	British Pakistani	

==== Scottish Government Junior Ministers ====
Party	Name	Portfolio(s)	Start	End	Ethnicity	Ref(s)
SNP	Humza Yousaf	External Affairs and International Development	2012	2014	British Pakistani	
SNP	Humza Yousaf	Europe and International Development	2014	2016	British Pakistani	
SNP	Humza Yousaf	Transport and the Islands	2016	2018	British Pakistani	
SNP	Kaukab Stewart	Culture, Europe and International Development	2024	2024	British Pakistani	
SNP	Kaukab Stewart	Equalities	2024	2026	British Pakistani	
SNP	Simita Kumar	Equalities and International Development	2026	present	British Indian (Indo-Fijian)	

=== Scottish Parliament ===
==== Members of the Scottish Parliament ====
Party	Name	Constituency	Start	End	Reason	Ethnicity	Ref(s)
SNP	Bashir Ahmad	Glasgow	2007	2009	Died in office	British Pakistani	
Labour	Hanzala Malik	Glasgow	2011	2016	Defeated	British Pakistani/White British (Mixed)	
SNP	Humza Yousaf	Glasgow; Glasgow Pollok	2011	2026	Retired	British Pakistani	
Labour	Anas Sarwar	Glasgow	2016	2026	Resigned to join the Burnham ministry and the House of Lords	British Pakistani	
Labour	Foysol Choudhury	Lothian	2021	2025	Suspended from Labour, became an independent	British Bangladeshi	
Independent	Foysol Choudhury	Lothian	2025	2026	Retired	British Bangladeshi	
Conservative	Pam Gosal	West Scotland	2021	2026	Defeated	British Indian	
Conservative	Sandesh Gulhane	Glasgow	2021	2026	Defeated	British Indian	
SNP	Kaukab Stewart	Glasgow Kelvin	2021	2026	Defeated	British Pakistani	
Labour	Irshad Ahmed	Edinburgh and Lothians East	2026	present	Serving	British Pakistani	
SNP	Michelle Campbell	Renfrewshire North and Cardonald	2026	present	Serving	Black British/White British (Mixed)	
Liberal Democrats	Yi-pei Chou Turvey	North East Scotland	2026	present	Serving	British Chinese (Han Taiwanese)	
Reform	Vic Currie	Highlands and Islands	2026	present	Serving	British Indian/White British (Mixed)	
Green	Iris Duane	Glasgow	2026	present	Serving	Black British	
SNP	Zen Ghani	Glasgow Cathcart and Pollok	2026	present	Serving	British Pakistani	
SNP	Simita Kumar	Edinburgh South Western	2026	present	Serving	British Indian (Indo-Fijian)	
Green	Q Manivannan	Edinburgh and Lothians East	2026	present	Serving	Tamil Indian	

=== Scottish Party Leaders ===
Party	Name	Start	End	Ethnicity
Labour	Anas Sarwar	2014 (Note: Acting)	2014	British Pakistani
Labour	Anas Sarwar	2021	2026	British Pakistani
SNP	Humza Yousaf	2023	2024	British Pakistani

== Wales ==
=== Welsh Government ===
==== First Ministers of Wales ====
Party	Name	Start	End	Ethnicity	Ref(s)
Labour	Vaughan Gething	2024	2024	Black British/White British (Mixed)	

==== Welsh Government Cabinet Ministers ====
Party	Name	Portfolio(s)	Start	End	Ethnicity	Ref(s)
Labour	Vaughan Gething	Health and Social Services	2016	2021	Black British/White British (Mixed)	
Labour	Vaughan Gething	Economy	2021	2024	Black British/White British (Mixed)	
Labour	Vaughan Gething	Counsel General (acting)	2024	2024	Black British/White British (Mixed)	

==== Welsh Government Junior Ministers ====
Party	Name	Portfolio(s)	Start	End	Ethnicity	Ref(s)
Labour	Vaughan Gething	Tackling Poverty	2013	2014	Black British/White British (Mixed)	
Labour	Vaughan Gething	Health	2014	2016	Black British/White British (Mixed)	

=== Senedd ===
==== Members of the Senedd ====
Party	Name	Constituency	Start	End	Reason	Ethnicity	Ref(s)
Plaid Cymru	Mohammad Asghar	South Wales East	2007	2009	Left Plaid Cymru, joined Conservative Party	British Pakistani	
Conservative	Mohammad Asghar	South Wales East	2009	2020	Died in office	British Pakistani	
Labour	Vaughan Gething	Cardiff South and Penarth	2011	2026	Retired	Black British/White British (Mixed)	
Conservative	Altaf Hussain	South Wales West	2015	2016	Defeated	British Indian	
Conservative	Altaf Hussain	South Wales West	2021	2026	Defeated	British Indian	
Conservative	Natasha Asghar	South Wales East; Casnewydd Islwyn	2021	present	Serving	British Pakistani	
Plaid Cymru	Zaynub Akbar	Caerdydd Ffynnon Taf	2026	present	Serving	British Indian	
Plaid Cymru	Safa Elhassan	Gŵyr Abertawe	2026	present	Serving	Black British	
Reform UK	Joshua Kim	Blaenau Gwent Caerffili Rhymni	2026	present	Serving	British Korean	
Labour	Shav Taj	Caerdydd Ffynnon Taf	2026	present	Serving	British Pakistani	

=== Welsh Party Leaders ===
Party	Name	Start	End	Ethnicity
Labour	Vaughan Gething	2024	2024	Black British/White British (Mixed)

== Northern Ireland ==
=== Northern Ireland Assembly ===
==== Members of the Northern Ireland Assembly ====
Party	Name	Constituency	Start	End	Reason	Ethnicity	Ref(s)
Alliance	Anna Lo	Belfast South	2007	2016	Retired	British Chinese Irish Chinese	

== Greater London Authority ==
=== Mayors of London ===
Party	Name	Start	End	Reason	Ethnicity	Ref(s)
Labour	Sadiq Khan	2016	present	Serving	British Pakistani	

=== Deputy Mayors of London ===
Party	Name	Portfolio(s)	Start	End	Ethnicity	Ref(s)
Conservative	Ray Lewis	Young People	2008	2008	Black British	
Conservative	Munira Mirza	Education and Culture	2012	2016	British Pakistani	
Labour	Rajesh Agarwal	Business	2016	2023	British Indian	
Labour	Shirley Rodrigues	Environment and Energy	2016	2024	British Indian	
Labour	Debbie Weekes-Bernard	Communities and Social Justice	2018	present	Black British	
Labour	Mete Coban	Environment and Energy	2024	present	British Turkish; British Cypriot	

=== London Assembly ===
==== Chairs of the London Assembly ====
Party	Name	Constituency	Start	End	Ethnicity
Labour	Trevor Phillips	Additional member	2000	2001	Black British
Labour	Trevor Phillips	Additional member	2002	2003	Black British
Labour Co-op	Jennette Arnold	Additional member	2008	2009	Black British
Labour Co-op	Jennette Arnold	Additional member	2011	2013	Black British
Labour Co-op	Jennette Arnold	Additional member	2015	2016	Black British
Labour Co-op	Jennette Arnold	Additional member	2017	2018	Black British
Labour Co-op	Jennette Arnold	Additional member	2019	2020	Black British
Labour	Navin Shah	Brent and Harrow	2020	2021	British Indian
Labour	Onkar Sahota	Ealing and Hillingdon	2022	2023	British Indian

==== London Assembly Members ====
Party	Name	Constituency	Start	End	Reason	Ethnicity	Ref(s)
Labour	David Lammy	Additional member	2000	2000	Resigned to become Member of Parliament for Tottenham	Black British	
Labour	Trevor Phillips	Additional member	2000	2003	Resigned	Black British	
Labour	Jennette Arnold	North East	2000	2021	Retired	Black British	
Labour	Murad Qureshi	Additional member	2004	2016	Defeated	British Bangladeshi	
Conservative	James Cleverly	Bexley and Bromley	2008	2016	Retired to become Member of Parliament for Braintree	Black British/White British (Mixed)	
Labour	Navin Shah	Brent and Harrow	2008	2021	Retired	British Indian	
Labour	Onkar Sahota	Ealing and Hillingdon	2012	2024	De-selected	British Indian	
Conservative	Kemi Badenoch	Additional member	2015	2017	Resigned to become Member of Parliament for Saffron Walden	Black British	
Conservative	Shaun Bailey	Additional member	2016	present	Serving	Black British	
Labour	Unmesh Desai	City and East	2016	present	Serving	British Indian	
Labour Co-op	Florence Eshalomi	Lambeth and Southwark	2016	2021	Retired to become Member of Parliament for Vauxhall	Black British	
UKIP	David Kurten	Additional member	2016	2021	Defeated	Black British/White British (Mixed)	
Labour	Marina Ahmad	Lambeth and Southwark	2021	present	Serving	British Bangladeshi	
Liberal Democrats	Hina Bokhari	Additional member	2021	present	Serving	British Pakistani	
Labour	Krupesh Hirani	Brent and Harrow	2021	present	Serving	British Indian	
Labour	Sem Moema	North East	2021	present	Serving	Black British	
Labour	Sakina Sheikh	Additional member	2021	2024	Defeated	British Pakistani	
Labour	Bassam Mahfouz	Ealing and Hillingdon	2024	present	Serving	British Lebanese	
Labour	James Small-Edwards	West Central	2024	present	Serving	Black British/White British (Mixed)	
Green	Benali Hamdache	Additional member	2026	present	Serving	British Algerian/White British (Mixed)	

== Local authorities ==
=== Directly elected local authority mayors ===
Party	Name	Constituency	Start	End	Reason	Ethnicity
Independent	Lutfur Rahman	Tower Hamlets	2010	2014	Founded Tower Hamlets First	British Bangladeshi
Tower Hamlets First	Lutfur Rahman	Tower Hamlets	2014	2015	Election court found corrupt or illegal practices and removed from office	British Bangladeshi
Aspire	Lutfur Rahman	Tower Hamlets	2022	present	Serving	British Bangladeshi
Labour	Marvin Rees	Bristol	2016	2024	Position abolished	Black British/White British (Mixed)
Labour	Rokhsana Fiaz	Newham	2018	2026	Retired	British Pakistani
Labour	Joanne Anderson	Liverpool	2021	2023	Position abolished	Black British
Labour Co-op	Brenda Dacres	Lewisham	2024	2026	Retired	Black British
Labour	Forhad Hussain	Newham	2026	present	Serving	British Pakistani
Green	Liam Shrivastava	Lewisham	2026	present	Serving	Black British

== Police and Crime Commissioners ==
=== Directly elected police and crime commissioners ===
Party	Name	Constituency	Start	End	Reason	Ethnicity	Ref(s)
Labour	Hardyal Dhindsa	Derbyshire	2016	2021	Defeated	British Indian	
Conservative	Festus Akinbusoye	Bedfordshire	2021	2024	Defeated	Black British	
Labour	Gary Godden	Nottinghamshire	2024	present	Serving	Black British/White British (Mixed)	
Labour	Nicolle Ndiweni	Derbyshire	2024	present	Serving	Black British	
Labour	Emma Wools	South Wales	2024	present	Serving	Black British/White British (Mixed)	

=== Deputy mayors for policing and crime of combined authorities and combined county authorities ===
Party	Name	Constituency	Start	End	Reason	Ethnicity
Labour Co-op	Alison Lowe	West Yorkshire	2021	present	Serving	Black British/White Irish (Mixed)
Labour	Kilvinder Vigurs	South Yorkshire	2025	present	Serving	British Indian
