= Catherine Ashley =

Catherine Ashley may refer to:

- Cathy Ashley, Baroness Ashley of Lambeth (born 1959), British charity executive and politician
- Kat Ashley (c. c. 1502–1565), friend and Lady of the Bedchamber to Queen Elizabeth I
