= Family and Childcare Trust =

British charity

The Family and Childcare Trust is a UK charity formed from the merger of the Daycare Trust and the Family and Parenting Institute in 2013.

== Research ==
The Trust produces extensive research on the early years and family services. The charity's produces three annual reports titled the Childcare Survey, Holiday Childcare Survey and Older People's Care Survey.

The annual Childcare Survey is published in the spring and documents the costs and availability of childcare in the UK. Data from the Childcare Survey has been used by the UK government to assess childcare in the UK and by the Living Wage Foundation to calculate the Living Wage. The Trust also publishes the annual Holiday Childcare Survey is published in the summer and documents the costs and availability of holiday childcare in the UK, and the annual Older People's Care Survey is published in the fall and documents the costs and availability of care for older people in the UK.

== Programmes ==
The Family and Childcare Trust runs a number of parent-led programmes.

The Parent Champions programme is a peer-to-peer volunteer support programme launched by the Daycare Trust in 2007. The Parent Champions model consists of parents reaching out to local parents in the community and speaking to them about their own experiences of local family services, particularly early education services.

The Young Dads Collective (YDC) works to reduce levels of poverty and isolation experienced by young dads aged 25 and under. The YDC is made of young dads who engage with and consult family services professionals as experts by experience. The YDC model involves supporting the young members to advocate on behalf of other young dads and developing the members' skill sets and employability.

The Family and Childcare Trust provides the secretariat for the All Party Parliamentary Group for Families in the Early Years.
