= Social savings =

Social savings is a growth in accounting techniques in order to evaluate the historical implications of new technology on economic growth. Developed in 1950 by American economic historian and scientist Robert Fogel, explains the methodology works to estimate the cost-savings of the new technology compared with the next best alternative. The first oral presentation was at the 1960 Purdue Cliometrics meeting, and the first published version was in the Journal of economic history in 1962.

A recent survey can be found in "economic and history: surveys in Cliometrics", edited by David Greasley and Les Oxley and published by Wiley-Blackwell in 2011. The relevant chapter is entitled "social savings" and is by Tim Leunig, London School of Economics.

== Calculation ==
The amount of social savings (SS) may be calculated as

SS = (P_{T0} − P_{T1})T_{1}

where P_{T0} is the price per unit of the alternative technology, P_{T1} is the price of the technology being evaluated. T_{1} is the quantity processed by the technology being evaluated. This saving in resource costs may be taken to be equal to the gain in real national income. Two noted social savings applications include social savings analysis on the contribution of the railway to the 19th century economic growth and the impact of information technology to the 20th century economic growth.

== Railroads and American economic growth ==
Social savings was introduced and applied to the railroads in a seminal book by economic historian and scientist Robert Fogel. The social savings analysis involved using quantitative methods to imagine what the U.S. economy would have been like in 1890 if there were no railroads. In the absence of railroads, freight transportation by rivers and canals would have been only moderately more expensive along most common routes. Fogel concluded that the difference in cost (or "social savings") attributable to railroads was negligible - about 2.7% of GNP. This counterfactual history view was vastly different from views proffered by railroad historians and made a controversial name for cliometrics.
