= July 2026 political peerages =

British life peerages awarded by Keir Starmer

The July 2026 political peerages were announced on 16 July 2026, four days before the end of Keir Starmer's premiership on 20 July.

Of the new peers, 16 are from the Labour Party, 5 from the Liberal Democrats, 3 from the Conservative Party and 2 on the crossbench.

== Life peerages ==
=== Labour Party peerages ===
- Alison Garnham – Chief Executive, Child Poverty Action Group; to be Baroness Garnham, of Stoke Newington in the London Borough of Hackney – 1 September 2026
- Alison Lowe OBE – Deputy Mayor for Policing and Crime in West Yorkshire; to be Baroness Lowe of Armley, of Seacroft in the City of Leeds – 18 August 2026
- Barbara Mills KC – Chair of the Bar Council of England and Wales (2025), Family Law Barrister and joint Head of Chambers at 4PB; to be Baroness Mills of Greenwich, of Greenwich in Greater London – 28 August 2026
- Cathy Ashley OBE – Chief Executive of Family Rights Group and former Chair of the Holocaust Memorial Day Trust; to be Baroness Ashley of Lambeth, of Lambeth in the London Borough of Lambeth – 2 September 2026
- Christina McAnea – Former General Secretary of Unison; to be Baroness McAnea, of Kelvingrove in the City of Glasgow – 17 August 2026
- June Sarpong OBE – Broadcaster, Charity Campaigner and Social Equity Advocate; to be Baroness Sarpong, of Walthamstow in the London Borough of Waltham Forest – 21 August 2026
- The Rt. Hon. Ken Macintosh DL – Former Presiding Officer of the Scottish Parliament; to be Baron Macintosh of Eastwood, of Eastwood in the County of Renfrewshire – 19 August 2026
- Kitty Ussher – British Economist, former Member of Parliament for Burnley and former Economic Secretary to the Treasury; to be Baroness Ussher, of Burnley in the County of Lancashire – 3 September 2026
- Marcus Davey CBE – Former CEO and Artistic Director of the Roundhouse; to be Baron Davey of Chalk Farm, of Chalk Farm in the London Borough of Camden – 26 August 2026
- Martin McTague OBE – National Chair of the Federation of Small Businesses; to be Baron McTague, of Heighington in the County of Durham – 26 August 2026
- Nick Stace OBE – Chief Global Impact Officer at Howden Group; to be Baron Stace, of Brighton in the County of East Sussex – 20 August 2026
- Parvais Jabbar MBE – Human Rights Expert, Co-Founder and Co-Executive Director of The Death Penalty Project; to be Baron Jabbar, of Little Venice in the City of Westminster – 18 August 2026
- Roberto Neri – CEO of The Ivors Academy and a Director of UK Music; to be Baron Neri, of Norwood in Greater London – 21 August 2026
- The Rt. Hon. Sir Sadiq Khan – Mayor of London and former Member of Parliament for Tooting; to be Baron Khan of Tooting, of Tooting in the London Borough of Wandsworth – 20 August 2026
- Saul Lehrfreund MBE – Human Rights Expert, Co-Founder and Co-Executive Director of The Death Penalty Project; to be Baron Lehfreund, of Highbury in the London Borough of Islington – 14 September 2026
- Tim J. Smith CBE – Former Chief Executive of the Food Standards Agency; to be Baron Smith of Ranmoor, of Ranmoor in the City of Sheffield – 17 August 2026

=== Liberal Democrat peerages ===
- Dave McCobb – Liberal Democrat Director of Field Campaigns. Former Hull City Councillor of 22 years; to be Baron McCobb, of Kingston upon Hull in the East Riding of Yorkshire – 3 September 2026
- Hannah Kitching – Chair of the Yorkshire Liberal Democrats and Town Mayor of Penistone. Former NHS physiotherapist and Barnsley Councillor; to be Baroness Kitching of Penistone, of Penistone in the County of South Yorkshire – 2 September 2026
- Julia Aglionby – Executive Director of the Foundation for Common Land. Agricultural vVluer and former Liberal Democrat Parliamentary Candidate; to be Baroness Aglionby, of Armathwaite in the County of Cumbria – 1 September 2026
- Mark Petterson – Director of Warwick Energy Limited. Pioneer of UK offshore wind and long-standing Adviser to the Liberal Democrats; to be Baron Petterson, of Shenington in the County of Oxfordshire – 28 August 2026
- Dr Tim Leunig – Chief Economist at Nesta and visiting professor at LSE. Former Senior Civil Servant and Economic Adviser; to be Baron Leunig, of Surbiton in the Royal Borough of Kingston upon Thames – 27 August 2026

=== Conservative peerages ===
- David Ross – Entrepreneur and Philanthropist. Co-Founder of Carphone Warehouse, Sponsor and Chair of David Ross Education Trust, Founder of the Nevill Holt Festival and former Chair of the National Portrait Gallery, London; to be Baron Ross of Nevill Holt, of Great Grimsby in the County of Lincolnshire – 25 August 2026
- General Sir Patrick Sanders KCB CBE DSO – Lately Chief of the General Staff, British Army; to be Baron Sanders of Hallingdal, of Hallingdal in the Kingdom of Norway and of East Knoyle in the County of Wiltshire – 4 September 2026
- Professor Swaran Singh – Professor of Social and Community Psychiatry, University of Warwick; Consultant Psychiatrist, Coventry and Warwickshire Partnership NHS Trust and former Equality and Human Rights Commissioner; to be Baron Singh of Solihull, of Solihull in the County of West Midlands – 19 August 2026

=== Crossbench peerages ===
- The Rt. Hon. Sir Brian Leveson – Investigatory Powers Commissioner. Former President of the Queen's Bench Division and Lord Justice of Appeal. Former Chair of the Sentencing Council and Chair of the Leveson Inquiry into the Culture, Practices and Ethics of the Press; to be Baron Leveson of Liverpool, of Liverpool in the County of Merseyside – 25 August 2026
- Sir Chris Wormald KCB – Former Cabinet Secretary and Head of the Civil Service; to be Baron Wormald, of Dulwich in the London Borough of Lambeth – 27 August 2026
