= 2026 Political Peerages =

2026 Political Peerages could refer to:

- May 2026 political peerages
- July 2026 political peerages
