= Family and Parenting Institute =

UK charity supporting families and children

The Family and Parenting Institute is an independent charity in the United Kingdom supporting families and children. It works with charities, businesses, and public services to offer practical help to families. Its campaigns and research work focus on building a "family friendly" society by offering insights into current and future family life. It runs the Family Friendly scheme, which aims to help public and private organisations to better understand diverse families and meet their needs. The Family and Parenting Institute merged with the Daycare Trust in January 2013 and is now called the Family and Childcare Trust.

== History ==
The Family and Parenting Institute was established by the Labour Government as the 'National Family and Parenting Institute' in 1999, in response to a recommendation made in the Supporting Families Green Paper 1998. The Institute modified its operating name and brand to 'Family and Parenting Institute' in 2006, though the registered name remains the National Family and Parenting Institute.

== Values ==
The institute describes its values as follows:

- Children are the future of society and families the bedrock.
- A successful society depends on equipping children and other family members to meet the challenges of life.
- Families should be valued and active policies to support them pursued.
- Many different individual roles and family forms are capable of achieving a strong and successful family.

== Current activities ==
As well as research, policy and public affairs, the Family and Parenting Institute is engaged in the following projects:

=== Parents’ Week ===
The institute has run Parents’ Week since 1999 – an annual week-long celebration of parents and families through events and projects throughout the UK. At the launch of the 2011 Parents’ Week, Minister of State for Children and Families, Sarah Teather MP stated that parenting issues were at the “top of the agenda” for the Coalition Government

=== Family Friendly Scheme ===
The Family Friendly scheme was launched by the institute in summer 2011 with the aim of making the UK a more family friendly society. Public, private and charity sector organisations joining in the scheme take a ‘Family Friendly pledge.’ They are then given a framework and resources for putting the pledge into action, focusing on customers, staff and services. Families themselves are given the opportunity to give feedback, via the scheme's website, on the quality of the service they received.

=== Family Friendly Report Cards ===
Since 2010, the Family and Parenting Institute has produced a “report card” on the UK's progress towards becoming a family friendly society. The 2010 report graded the UK on the following factors: costs of raising a child; maternity and paternity leave; elderly care; work-life balance; child and pensioner poverty; childhood commercialisation; neighbourhoods and green spaces and care of vulnerable children.

- In 2010 the UK was graded an overall score of C−.
- However, in 2011, this was downgraded to D+. The economic squeeze on families was cited as the reason for the drop.

=== Commercialisation and Sexualisation of Childhood ===
The Family and Parenting Institute contributed to the 2011 Bailey Review which examined the commercialisation and sexualisation of childhood by advertisers, corporates and the media.

=== Families in an Age of Austerity ===
The Family and Parenting Institute is in the process of a two-year research project to track how the UK's economic problems are affecting family life. The project has launched two reports, Families in the Age of Austerity, in January 2011, and The Impact of Austerity Measures on Households with Children, in January 2012, in conjunction with the Institute for Fiscal Studies. Both received widespread coverage in the media. The project's final report is expected in January 2013.

=== Family Voice ===
Family Voice is a project that started in 2011. It explores the use of social media to find out how to engage more with families.

=== Family Room ===
The Family and Parenting Institute coordinates a coalition of 15 leading family charities to attend party political conferences in the autumn.

=== Associate Parliamentary Group for Parents and Families ===
This all-parliamentary forum was established to provide impartial and progressive debate between politicians, parents’ groups, charities and researchers.

== Notable Previous Activities ==
=== Early Home Learning Matters ===
This project brought together the evidence focused on the vital role of parents in securing good outcomes for children, providing information on how to plan and deliver effective services to involve parents in their children's early learning.

=== Parenting Fund ===
From March 2004 to March 2011, the Family and Parenting Institute managed the Parenting Fund on behalf of the Department for Education (formerly the Department for Schools and Families). The fund made grants made available to local organisations to support vulnerable families. The impact of the Parenting Fund was assessed and a report published detailing the achievements. In particular:

- Impact was felt to be greatest around parental support, disability, fathers and managing conflict.
- Mothers had a better understanding of the impact of domestic violence on their children as well as themselves, and were able to form supportive relationships with other mothers.
- Separated/divorced parents in conflict were assisted to work better together in order to minimise the impact on their children.

== In the press ==
The Family and Parenting Institute regularly receives coverage in the media. Its aims and work has been welcomed and supported by the Coalition Government led by Prime Minister David Cameron

Recent coverage has included FPI's claims that the Coalition Government's cuts package will hit families with babies hardest, the FPI's focus on the costs of raising a child, and its findings on the impact of austerity measures on households with children

== Other Relevant Links ==
1. http://familyandchildcaretrust.org
2. http://www.familyandparenting.org
3. http://www.wearefamilyfriendly.org
4. http://www.parentsweek.org.uk
