= Federation of Small Businesses =

British business organisation

- National Federation of Self Employed & Small Businesses
- Abbreviation: FSB
- Formation: 1974
- Registration no.: 1263540
- Legal status: Not for profit company
- Purpose: Membership body for small businesses and the self-employed
- Headquarters: Blackpool, England
- Location: UK
- Members: >160,000 (2016)
- Interim National Chair: Tina McKenzie MBE
- Chief Executive Officer: Julie Lilley
- Board of directors: Caroline Platt, Julie Lilley, Sharon Jandu OBE, Ben Francis, Prem Goyal OBE, Marc O'Hagan, Matthew Rooke, Ian Ross, Arnab Dutt OBE, Gillian Frew, Ben Ramsay
- Main organ: Board of Directors
- Subsidiaries: FSB Publications Limited, FSB Recruitment Limited, FSB Sales Limited, F.S.B. (Member Services) Limited, FSB Gold Club Limited, Keep Trade Local Ltd, Real Life Entrepreneurs Limited
- Revenue: £25.6M (2016)
- Staff: 198 (2026)
- Website: Official website
- Formerly called: National Federation of Self Employed

The Federation of Small Businesses (FSB) is a UK business organisation representing small and medium-sized businesses. It was formed in 1974 as the National Federation of Self Employed (NFSE). The current name for the organisation was adopted in 1991. It is registered with Companies House as The National Federation of Self Employed & Small Businesses Limited (company number 1263540).

FSB is a member-led, not-for-profit and non-party political organisation. FSB is a lobbying organisation representing small firms and the self-employed to UK, national, local and devolved government. FSB offers its members a range of benefits, such as a 24-hour legal advice line and free business banking.

== Structure ==
The current Interim National Chair of FSB is Tina McKenzie, who took up the role following Martin McTague stepping down when he was appointed to the House of Lords in July 2026.

Prior to 2018 FSB had 184 branches around the UK and these were grouped into 33 regions. Each branch and region has its own committee. In addition, there was a national committee which included representatives from each regional committee.

In January 2018, FSB underwent a modernisation programme and the Board of Directors altered the organisation's volunteer structure by switching from elected Branches and Regions to a new election and selection process. In 2021, the Board of Directors appointed a new scrutiny body, made up of members appointed through an independent selection process, to act as a critical friend to the Board of Directors in assessing its performance and effectiveness. The Scrutiny Body’s overall purpose is to obtain assurance on behalf of FSB members that the strategic direction of the organisation is in line with the principles and objectives set out in its Constitution.

== Lobbying ==
FSB claims that its past lobbying activities have contributed to changes benefiting small businesses:

- The introduction of, and periodic increases to, an Employment Allowance for small business employers: the allowance enables smaller businesses to reduce their National Insurance liability
- Fast introduction and expansion of a range of government support for small businesses and the self-employed affected by the COVID-19 pandemic; including the Coronavirus Job Retention Scheme (‘furlough’); the Self-Employment Income Support Scheme (SEISS); business rates relief and various grants.
- The reduction or removal of Corporation Tax for small limited companies
- Creation of small business rates relief
- Preventing the wholesale expansion of VAT to smaller businesses under the current threshold
- Driving new legislation to limit the widespread problem of late payments from big businesses to their small suppliers

== Membership ==
FSB is a member-led federation. Membership criteria are as follows:

- Self-Employed or the owner, partner, or director of a business (or businesses) based in the United Kingdom
- Fewer than 250 employees.
- Agree to the Members' Code of Conduct
- Not barred from membership

The membership was 185,000 in 2006 and still over 160,000 in 2016. The membership is 200,000+ if Joint, Associate, Retired, Connect and Business Creation (pre-start-up) affiliates are included.

== Small Business Index ==
The FSB Small Business Index measures confidence among small firms. The FSB SBI has been quoted by the Bank of England, the BBC, Economia, and EADT.

== Current logo ==
The current logo for the organisation was adopted in November 2015. The costs of this re-branding was £0.3M and took well over a year to complete including a complete re-branding of the FSB Website.

== See also ==
- British Chambers of Commerce
- Confederation of British Industry
- TheCityUK
- Institute of Directors
