= Julia Aglionby, Baroness Aglionby =

British surveyor

The Right Honourable The Baroness Aglionby FRGS FRSA DL
- Baroness Aglionby at her farm in Cumbria, 2023

Member of the House of Lords
- Lord Temporal
- Life peerage 1 September 2026

Personal details
- Born: Julia Catherine Weir Aglionby; 4 October 1969 (age 57)
- Party: Liberal Democrats
- Education: Somerville College, Oxford; University College London; Newcastle University

Julia Catherine Weir Aglionby, Baroness Aglionby, FRGS, FRSA, DL (born 4 October 1969) is a British agricultural economist, land agent, and politician.

== Early life and education ==
Aglionby was born on 4 October 1969 in London, England. She was educated at St Paul's Girls' School, a private school in London. She studied pure and applied biology at Somerville College, Oxford, graduating with a Bachelor of Arts (BA) degree: as per tradition, her BA was promoted to a Master of Arts (MA Oxon) degree. She then studied environment and natural resource economics at University College London, graduating with a Master of Science (MSc) degree. Later, she undertook research in law at the Newcastle University, graduating with a Doctor of Philosophy (PhD) degree in 2014. Her doctoral thesis was titled "The governance of commons in national parks: plurality and purpose".

== Career ==
Aglionby worked as an environmental economist (1993–1995) and land agent (1997–2013). She was a member of the board of Natural England between 2014 and 2019. She has been Executive Director of the Foundation for Common Land since 2012 and Professor in Practice at the University of Cumbria since 2019. She is also a trustee of an organic pasture for life Care Farm - Susan’s Farm CIO.

In October 2025, Aglionby was appointed a Deputy Lieutenant of Cumbria.

=== Political career ===
She contested Carlisle for the Liberal Democrats in the 2019 General Election. Aglionby contested the new constituency of Penrith and Solway in the 2024 general election.

In the July 2026 political peerages, it was announced that she was to be made a life peer and would sit in the House of Lords for the Liberal Democrats. She was created as Baroness Aglionby, of Armathwaite in the County of Cumbria on 1 September 2026.
