= Saul Lehrfreund, Baron Lehrfreund =

British human rights expert

The Right Honourable The Lord Lehrfreund MBE

Member of the House of Lords
- Lord Temporal
- Life peerage 14 September 2026

Personal details
- Party: Labour

Saul Anthony Lehrfreund, Baron Lehrfreund MBE is a British law expert in the field of constitutional and international human rights law. He is the co-founder and the co-executive director of The Death Penalty Project.

The Death Penalty Project was founded in 1992 and Lehrfreund has represented prisoners facing death sentences in Commonwealth of Nations countries and at international tribunals. He has also served on expert delegations to Japan, Taiwan, China and India regarding the death penalty and assisted lawyers in constitutional cases where the death penalty is present. He is a founder member of the UK Foreign & Commonwealth Office Pro Bono Panel that represents British citizens who face the death penalty. He is a visiting professor at the University of Reading.

He was appointed a Member of the Order of the British Empire (MBE) in the 2000 Birthday Honours for services to international human rights law. In the July 2026 political peerages, it was announced that he was to be made a life peer and will sit in the House of Lords for the Labour Party. He was created as Baron Lehrfreund, of Highbury in the London Borough of Islington on 14 September 2026.
