= Marcus Davey, Baron Davey of Chalk Farm =

British theatre administrator (born 1967)

The Right Honourable The Lord Davey of Chalk Farm CBE

Member of the House of Lords
- Lord Temporal
- Life peerage 26 August 2026

Personal details
- Born: Marcus John Davey; July 1967 (age 59)
- Party: Labour

Marcus John Davey, Baron Davey of Chalk Farm, CBE (born July 1967) is a British arts administrator. He was chief Executive and artistic director of the Roundhouse in London from 1999 to 2025. In July 2026, he was nominated to sit in the House of Lords as a Labour life peer.

== Career ==
Davey studied at Dartington College of Arts. He worked as Administrator of the Dartington International Summer School, Arts Manager for Dartington Hall Trust, and later as Chief Executive and artistic director of the Norfolk and Norwich Festival, where he expanded programming, commissioned new works, and developed education initiatives.

=== Roundhouse ===
Appointed in 1999, Davey worked with founder Sir Torquil Norman on the redevelopment of the venue, which reopened in 2006. He oversaw further expansions, including the Roundhouse Studios and Roundhouse Works. He curated artistic programmes featuring international artists and appointed the actor Daniel Kaluuya as Associate Artistic Director. He stepped down in 2025 after 26 years.

=== Other roles and honours ===
Davey has been on the boards or advisory bodies of the Paul Hamlyn Foundation (as trustee), Cultural Learning Alliance, PRS Foundation, and Brook Street Band Trust. He is an honorary fellow of the Royal Central School of Speech and Drama and Dartington College of Arts. He was appointed OBE in the 2012 New Year Honours and CBE in the 2019 Honours List, both for services to the arts and young people.

In the July 2026 political peerages, it was announced that he was to be made a life peer and will sit in the House of Lords as a Labour peer. On 26 August 2026, he was created Baron Davey of Chalk Farm, of Chalk Farm in the London Borough of Camden.
