= Martin McTague, Baron McTague =

British businessman and life peer (born 1956)

The Right Honourable The Baron McTague OBE

Member of the House of Lords
- Lord Temporal
- Life peerage 26 August 2026

Personal details
- Born: September 1956 (age 70)
- Party: Labour

Martin Gerard McTague, Baron McTague (born September 1956) is a British entrepreneur, business owner and small business advocate. From 2022 to 2026, he was national chair of the Federation of Small Businesses (FSB). In July 2026, he was nominated to sit in the House of Lords as a Labour life peer.

== Early life and education ==
McTague was born in September 1956; both his parents grew up in orphanages. He grew up in Birmingham, England.

== Career ==
McTague started his first business in the late 1980s and has run his own enterprises for over 35 years. He owns and manages three companies offering public policy consultancy (Politics NE Ltd/Pical CIC), engineering and IT consultancy services (A3C Solutions Ltd). His experience includes working with institutional investors, managing teams of up to 60 employees and handling sophisticated financial and marketing systems.

=== Advocacy and public roles ===
McTague has been a volunteer with the Federation of Small Businesses (FSB) for more than 20 years, serving as National Policy & Advocacy Chair and Vice Chair. As National Chair, he represented small businesses at senior levels of government and opposition, chaired the FSB Board and focused on building partnerships, tackling late payments, reducing regulatory burdens and supporting enterprise policy. He stepped down as FSB chair in August 2026.

He served as a member of the government's Low Pay Commission from 2018 to 2023 and was appointed to the Advisory, Conciliation, and Arbitration Service in 2023. In the 2024 King's New Year Honours, he was appointed an Officer of the Order of the British Empire (OBE) for services to small businesses.

In the July 2026 political peerages, it was announced that he was to be made a life peer and would sit in the House of Lords as a Labour peer. On 26 August 2026, he was created Baron McTague, of Heighington in the County of Durham. On 14 September 2026, he was introduced in the House of Lords, supported by Baroness Armstrong of Hill Top and Lord Wilson of Sedgefield. He made his maiden speech on 15 October 2026 during a debate on support for family businesses.

== Personal life ==
McTague lives in Newton Aycliffe, County Durham. He is married to Sue.
