= Alison Garnham, Baroness Garnham =

British charity executive (born 1959)

The Right Honourable The Baroness Garnham FAcSS

Member of the House of Lords
- Lord Temporal
- Life peerage 1 September 2026

Personal details
- Born: Alison Esther Garnham; July 1959 (age 67)
- Party: Labour

Alison Esther Garnham, Baroness Garnham, FAcSS (born July 1959) is a British charity executive and academic of social policy.

== Biography ==
Garnham was born in July 1959.

Her early career was as an lecturer at the University of North London, before moving in to the third sector as director of policy for One Parent Families and then as CEO of the Daycare Trust from 2006 to 2010. Since 2010, she has been chief executive of the Child Poverty Action Group.

In the July 2026 political peerages, it was announced that she was to be made a life peer and will sit in the House of Lords for the Labour Party. She was created as Baroness Garnham, of Stoke Newington in the London Borough of Hackney on 1 September 2026.

Garnham is an elected Fellow of the Academy of Social Sciences (FAcSS).
