= Dave McCobb, Baron McCobb =

British Liberal Democrats politician

The Right Honourable The Lord McCobb
- Official portrait, 2026

Member of the House of Lords
- Lord Temporal
- Life peerage 3 September 2026

Personal details
- Born: David James McCobb
- Party: Liberal Democrats

David James McCobb, Baron McCobb is a British politician from the Liberal Democrats.

== Biography ==
Born in Beverley, brought up in Haltemprice, and having lived in Hull for 25 years, Dave McCobb served as a councillor on Hull City Council for 24 years during which time he was a member of the cabinet.

Dave was educated at Hymers College, Hull (1991-1998) and studied Modern Languages at Keble College, Oxford (1998-2002).

Dave represented the Beverley Ward in Hull from 2002 until 2018 and then the Beverley and Newland ward until 2026.

Dave has worked for the Liberal Democrats for 22 years. At the 2024 United Kingdom local elections, Dave served as his party's Director of Campaign and Elections. As of September 2026 Dave is still in post for the Liberal Democrats.

In the July 2026 political peerages, it was announced that he was to be made a life peer and will sit in the House of Lords for the Liberal Democrats. He was created as Baron McCobb, of Kingston upon Hull in the East Riding of Yorkshire on 3 September 2026.
