= Daycare Trust =

Daycare Trust is the UK's national childcare charity, campaigning for quality, accessible, affordable childcare for all, and raising the voices of children, parents and carers. Daycare Trust advises parents and carers, providers, employers, trade unions and policymakers on childcare issues. The Family and Childcare Trust was formed from the merger of the Daycare Trust and Family and Parenting Institute in 2013. The Daycare Trust was established in 1986 and is headquartered in London. It is a registered charity and company.

== History ==
The concept for Daycare Trust emerged in the 1970s in the context of the growing feminist movement. Many women desired both a family and a work life, but the childcare infrastructure was not in place. Additionally, the Children Act 1948 stigmatized parents for "dumping" their children in nurseries, categorizing those children as "at risk" and "maternally deprived."

Activists, mostly women, from various organizations campaigned to establish nurseries in various places, primarily in colleges and universities. From there they tackled the issue of quality, and campaigned for better professional training.

In 1986, a group of these activists established Daycare Trust, creating a unified base of support to carry out the charitable work of the National Childcare Campaign (a coalition of local groups formed in 1980 to campaign for workplace nurseries and better staff training).

=== 1986, year of establishment ===
- Public provision of childcare was discouraged by the lack of funding – tax relief on employer supported childcare was removed and local authority funding was cut – and private nurseries were flourishing (59,000 nursery places in 1990).
- By 1986/7, 47.5% of under fives were in early education.
- Family Income Supplement, the main source of state financial support for families, did not target any help specifically to childcare costs, and there was no regulation/guidance for the childcare workforce.

=== Today ===
- There are more than 1.5 million childcare places registered with Ofsted (March 2009).
- 3,500 children’s centres have been established in communities across the country offering services to 2.7 million children under five and their families.
- All three- and four-year-olds are entitled to free early years education for up to 15 hours per week for 38 weeks per year – an offer taken up by 92% of the three-year-old population and 98% of the four-year-old population.
- The Childcare Act 2006 places duties on local authorities to provide sufficient childcare for working parents in their area and to make sure that parents have access to information about childcare.
- The Early Years Foundation Stage sets standards for workforce training and qualifications
- Many parents can claim help with their childcare costs from a range of schemes including tax credits.
- Parents can search for childcare places through their local family information service. Local family information services can be found using Directgov

=== Chief executives ===
- 1989-1994 Marion Kozak
- 1994-1996 Carol Sheriff
- 1996-2000 Colette Kelleher
- 2000-2005 Stephen Burke
- 2005-2007 Christine Walton
- 2007-2010 Alison Garnham & Emma Knights
- 2010 Alison Garnham
- 2010- Anand Shukla

== Mission ==
Daycare Trust's mission is to "secure access to high quality affordable childcare for all children in Great Britain where and when they and their parents want and need it, at a price their parents can afford."

The charity defines childcare as "arrangements parents make for their children when they are not looking after the children themselves; this could be in individual or group care in a variety of settings, including at home."

Daycare Trust work includes:

=== Policy and research ===
Daycare Trust conducts independent and robust research on behalf of a number of government departments, charities and research councils. This research aims to “further the availability of sustainable, affordable and good quality childcare to all families; offering real choices to families to balance work and family life”.

Daycare Trust provides informed comment on key childcare issues to the media and government, ensuring that the benefits of childcare and the issues faced by parents are well understood.

=== Information ===
Daycare Trust’s information services benefit over 450,000 people per year. These services consist of a telephone information line, which provides comprehensive information about childcare to callers; e-mail information service; and with factsheets for parents and employers and an interactive.

=== Training and consultancy ===
Daycare Trust runs training and consultancy on a range of topics, from tax credits to involving parents in service development and delivery, to a range of organizations and services.

== Policy recommendations ==
The organisation's current policy priorities are set out in the 2010 publication Childcare Charter, published in the run up to the 2010 general election.

The Childcare Charter called on the next government to:

1. Aim to spend 1% of GDP on early childhood education and care so that all children get the best start in life
2. Extend free places to ensure that all children benefit from early childhood education and care
3. Extend parental leave and make workplaces family-friendly
4. Fill the gaps in provision and guarantee extended schools
5. Make childcare affordable for all parents
6. Celebrate Sure Start Children’s Centres and extend the range of services on offer
