= Roberto Neri, Baron Neri =

British music executive and politician

The Right Honourable The Lord Neri
- Official portrait, 2026

Member of the House of Lords
- Lord Temporal
- Life peerage 21 August 2026

Personal details
- Party: Labour

Roberto Bruno Neri, Baron Neri is a British music executive and politician.

He is Chief Executive of the Ivors Academy. Neri helped expand the membership of the academy from 2,000 to 15,000 members. The chair of the academy, musician Tom Gray said that Neri had "spent his entire career on one stubborn argument: that songwriters and composers deserve actual, spendable money, not just polite applause" and that he was "one of the rare people in this industry, who's won that argument on his day".

In the July 2026 political peerages, it was announced that Neri was to be made a life peer and sit in the House of Lords for the Labour Party; he was created as Baron Neri, of Norwood in Greater London on 21 August 2026.
