= Barbara Mills, Baroness Mills of Greenwich =

British barrister

The Right Honourable The Baroness Mills of Greenwich KC

Member of the House of Lords
- Lord Temporal
- Life peerage 28 August 2026

Personal details
- Party: Labour

Barbara Mills, Baroness Mills of Greenwich KC is a British barrister. She is the first black woman elected as Chair of the Bar Council, in the 131-year history of the organisation, which represents the barristers in England and Wales.

She was called to the Bar in 1990, took silk in 2020, and was given a peerage in the July 2026 political peerages.

== Early life and education ==
Mills is British-Ghanaian and was privately educated at The Royal Masonic School for Girls. She studied at the University of Hull, and then gained a place at the Inns of Court School of Law, London, before obtaining a pupillage at the bar. She has a sister Linda, who lives in America. She said that she quickly learned that 'talent on its own is not enough' without access to opportunities, which this funding had given her and yet she still had challenges gaining work without a network in the profession.

== Career ==
Mills previously served as head of chambers at 4PB, deputy high court judge and was ten years Recorder on the South Eastern Circuit, and had served as vice-chair of the bar council and served as co-chair of its race working group. She was co-editor of The International Family Law Journal and sat on the governing bench of the Inner Temple. Her practice has been ranked highly by Legal 500 and in Chambers & Partners. She has promoted mediation in her career, and participated in international exchanges on this topic. In 2024, Mills was awarded a lifetime achievement award by the Women and Diversity in Law Awards.
