= Swaran Singh, Baron Singh of Solihull =

British academic and psychiatrist

The Right Honourable The Lord Singh of Solihull
- Official portrait, 2026

Member of the House of Lords
- Lord Temporal
- Life peerage 19 August 2026

Personal details
- Born: Swaran Preet Singh India
- Citizenship: United Kingdom
- Party: Conservative
- Education: University of Jammu (MBBS) Postgraduate Institute of Medical Education and Research, Chandigarh (MD); University of Nottingham (DM) Royal College of Psychiatrists (MRCPsych, FRCPsych)
- Occupation: Psychiatrist, academic
- Known for: Social and community psychiatry, early intervention in psychosis.
- Website: warwick.ac.uk/fac/sci/med/staff/singhs/

Swaran Preet Singh, Baron Singh of Solihull is a British psychiatrist, academic and life peer. He is Professor of Social and Community Psychiatry at the University of Warwick and a consultant psychiatrist in the National Health Service (NHS). He is known for his work in social and community psychiatry, early intervention in psychosis, and mental health services research. In August 2026, he was appointed to the House of Lords as a life peer, sitting as a member of the Conservative Party.

== Early life and education ==
Singh did his Bachelor of Medicine and Bachelor of Surgery (MBBS) degree in 1985 from the Government Medical College, University of Jammu, India. He completed his Doctor of Medicine (MD) in 1990 at the Postgraduate Institute of Medical Education and Research, Chandigarh, India.

He later moved to the United Kingdom, where he obtained Membership of the Royal College of Psychiatrists (MRC Psych) in 1993 from the Royal College of Psychiatrists, London. In 2003, he was awarded a Doctor of Medicine (DM) degree from the University of Nottingham. He was elected Fellow of the Royal College of Psychiatrists (FRC Psych) in 2007.

== Career ==
Singh has held academic and clinical positions in the United Kingdom and is Professor of Social and Community Psychiatry at the University of Warwick.

He is also a consultant psychiatrist within the National Health Service.

From 2013 to 2019, Singh served as a Commissioner of the Equality and Human Rights Commission.

Singh has contributed to public discussions on psychiatry, race, equality and mental health through articles, interviews and broadcast media. His work has been featured by the The Psychologist, the BBC and other British media outlets.

Research work

Singh's research focuses on social and community psychiatry, early intervention in psychosis, youth mental health, ethnic inequalities in healthcare, cultural psychiatry and global mental health.

His work has examined pathways to care in first episode psychosis, the duration of untreated psychosis, transitions between child and adult mental health services, and disparities affecting ethnic minority populations.

He has also contributed to research on mental health service delivery, continuity of care for young people, and international collaborations in global mental health.

Singh has been involved in the Warwick–India–Canada (WIC) global mental health programme, which aims to improve outcomes for psychosis through culturally adapted interventions, early identification, and improved service delivery models.

His published work also includes systematic reviews and clinical studies on recovery oriented interventions, psychosocial treatments, and outcomes in early psychosis, with publications in journals including The Lancet Psychiatry, Schizophrenia Bulletin, and Clinical Psychology Review.

== Selected publications ==
- Singh, S. P. Transition from child to adult mental health services: needs, barriers, experiences and new models of care. World Psychiatry (2015).
- Singh, S. P. et al. Warwick–India–Canada Global Mental Health Group. BMJ Open (2021).
- O'Brien, A.; Fahmy, R.; Singh, S. P. (2010). "Disengagement from mental health services: a literature review". Social Psychiatry and Psychiatric Epidemiology.
- Hetrick, S. E.; Bailey, A. P.; Smith, K. E.; Malla, A.; Mathias, S.; Singh, S. P.; O'Reilly, A.; et al. (2017). "Integrated (one-stop shop) youth health care: Best available evidence and future directions". Medical Journal of Australia.
- Okai, D.; Owen, G.; McGuire, H.; Singh, S.; Churchill, R.; Hotopf, M. (2017). "Mental capacity in psychiatric patients: systematic review". The British Journal of Psychiatry.
- Singh, S. P. (2009). "Transition of care from child to adult mental health services: the great divide". Current Opinion in Psychiatry.
- Singh, S. P.; Cooper, J. E.; Fisher, H. L.; Tarrant, C. J.; Lloyd, T.; Banjo, J.; et al. (2005). "Determining the chronology and components of psychosis onset: The Nottingham Onset Schedule (NOS)". Schizophrenia Research.
- Malla, A.; Iyer, S.; McGorry, P.; Cannon, M.; Coughlan, H.; Singh, S.; Jones, P.; et al. (2016). "From early intervention in psychosis to youth mental health reform: a review of the evolution and transformation of mental health services for young people". Social Psychiatry and Psychiatric Epidemiology.
- Paul, M.; Street, C.; Wheeler, N.; Singh, S. P. (2015). "Transition to adult services for young people with mental health needs: a systematic review". Clinical Child Psychology and Psychiatry.
- Singh, S. P.; Paul, M.; Ford, T.; Kramer, T.; Weaver, T. (2008). "Transitions of care from child and adolescent mental health services to adult mental health services (TRACK study): a study of protocols in Greater London". BMC Health Services Research.
- Singh, S. P.; Grange, T. (2006). "Measuring pathways to care in first-episode psychosis: a systematic review". Schizophrenia Research.
- Singh, S. P.; Burns, T. (2003). "Race and mental health: there is more to race than racism". BMJ.
- Singh, S. P. (2010). "Early intervention in psychosis". The British Journal of Psychiatry.

== Awards and honours ==
In 1994, Singh received the Merck Essay Prize from the Royal College of Psychiatrists.

In 2013, he received a Silver Award from the Advisory Committee on Clinical Excellence Awards (ACCEA).

In 2023, Singh received the Science and Tech Award at the British Sikh Awards. He was also awarded Honorary Membership of the World Psychiatric Association for contributions to psychiatry and received an Honorary Fellowship from the World Association for Social Psychiatry.

In 2024, Singh received the National Clinical Impact Award (N3) from the UK Department of Health's Advisory Committee on Clinical Impact Awards for contributions to clinical practice in psychiatry.

In 2024, Singh received the Faculty of General Adult Psychiatry Lifetime Achievement Award from the Royal College of Psychiatrists.

In 2025, Singh was included in the Health Service Journal's list of the 50 most influential Black, Asian and minority ethnic people in health.

Singh was given a peerage in the July 2026 political peerages; he was created as Baron Singh of Solihull, of Solihull in the County of West Midlands on 19 August 2026.
