= Tim Leunig, Baron Leunig =

British economist

The Right Honourable The Lord Leunig

Member of the House of Lords
- Lord Temporal
- Life peerage 27 August 2026

Personal details
- Born: Timothy Charles Leunig; 26 February 1971 (age 55)
- Party: Liberal Democrat
- Education: University of Oxford

Timothy Charles Leunig, Baron Leunig (born 26 February 1971) is an economist at the London School of Economics's Department of Economic History. After a long career as a civil servant, he became a director at the economic consultants Public First. Leunig was given a peerage in the July 2026 political peerages.

== Education ==
Leunig gained a 1st class BA degree in modern history and economics, and then an MPhil in economics in 1994, and a DPhil in economics in 1996, all from Oxford University. He won the George Webb Medley Junior and Senior Prize in 1992 and 1994 at Oxford. From the Economic History Association, he won their Alexander Gerschenkron prize in 1997.

== Career ==
In 1998, Leunig joined the London School of Economics. From January 2011 to October 2012, he was Chief Economist at the think tank CentreForum.

Leunig has written for Financial Times, Prospect and Inside Housing.

Leunig was the editor of Explorations in Economic History between 2008 and 2012.

He was Economic Advisor to Sajid Javid and Rishi Sunak when they served as Chancellor of the Exchequer, and is credited with inventing the UK's employment furlough scheme during the COVID pandemic.

Leunig was the Chief Scientific Adviser at the Department for Education between 2014 and 2017. From 7 September 2023 to 6 October 2023 he was the adviser to UK Prime Minister Rishi Sunak on education.

== Research interests ==
Leunig is interested in the productivity of Britain's labour force, from a current or historical perspective. He is known to compare the state of Britain's economy with Britain in the Industrial Revolution.

== Personal life ==
Leunig married Julia Cerutti in 1996 in north Oxfordshire, who attended St Hilda's College, Oxford, from 1989 to 1992.

He maintains a garden that includes a stream and waterfall and is part of the National Garden Scheme.

Business positions
Preceded by Richard H. Steckel	Editor of Explorations in Economic History; 2008 –	Succeeded by Incumbent
