= Parvais Jabbar, Baron Jabbar =

British human rights activist

The Right Honourable The Lord Jabbar MBE

Member of the House of Lords
- Lord Temporal
- Life peerage 18 August 2026

Personal details
- Party: Labour

Parvais Jabbar, Baron Jabbar MBE is a British human rights activist and politician.

He is the co-founder of the Death Penalty Project (DPP). In the July 2026 political peerages, it was announced that he was to be made a life peer and will sit in the House of Lords for the Labour Party. He was created as Baron Jabbar, of Little Venice in the City of Westminster on 18 August 2026.
