= Cathy Ashley, Baroness Ashley of Lambeth =

British charity executive

The Right Honourable The Baroness Ashley of Lambeth OBE

Member of the House of Lords
- Lord Temporal
- Life peerage 2 September 2026

Personal details
- Born: Catherine Ashley; January 1965 (age 61)
- Party: Labour

Catherine Helen Ashley, Baroness Ashley of Lambeth, OBE (born January 1965) is a British charity executive. Since 2004, she has been chief executive of the Family Rights Group. She is also active in the Labour Party as national treasurer of the Jewish Labour Movement and was a councillor on Lambeth Council in the 1990s.

From 2010 to 2016, Ashley was chair of trustees of the Holocaust Memorial Day Trust. In the 2017 Queen's Birthday Honours, she was appointed Officer of the Order of the British Empire (OBE) "for services to Holocaust commemoration and awareness".

In the July 2026 political peerages, it was announced that she was to be made a life peer and will sit in the House of Lords for the Labour Party. She was created as Baroness Ashley of Lambeth, of Lambeth in the London Borough of Lambeth on 2 September 2026.
