= Nick Stace, Baron Stace =

British public relations executive

The Right Honourable The Lord Stace OBE
- Official portrait, 2026
- Born: Nicholas Charles Stace
- Occupations: Business executive; Public relations executive; Government adviser
- Employer: Howden Group
- Known for: Public service

Member of the House of Lords
- Lord Temporal
- Life peerage 20 August 2026

Personal details
- Party: Labour
- Website: www.howdengroup.com

Nicholas Charles Stace, Baron Stace is a British business executive and former government adviser whose work has focused on consumer rights, institutional reform, social mobility and environmental policy. He has been chief global impact officer at Howden Group since January 2026 and chair of the Prison Reform Trust since 2024. In July 2026, he was nominated for a life peerage to sit in the House of Lords as a Labour peer. He was created Baron Stace, of Brighton in the County of East Sussex, on 20 August 2026 and was introduced to the House of Lords on 8 September 2026.

== Consumer advocacy ==
Much of Stace's early career was associated with consumer advocacy. At the British consumer organisation Which?, where he served as director of campaigns and communications and later as deputy chief executive,he was involved in campaigns concerning the marketing of unhealthy food to children, restaurant hygiene and the regulation of estate agents. One campaign sought greater public access to restaurant inspection reports and the introduction of visible hygiene ratings, while another highlighted the limited regulation of estate agencies in the United Kingdom.

In March 2008, he joined the office of Prime Minister Gordon Brown as a special adviser and director of strategic communications. Later that year, he left the position to become chief executive of the Australian consumer organisation Choice, taking up the new role in February 2009.

As chief executive of Choice, he advocated increased transparency and regulatory scrutiny in concentrated markets, including the Australian supermarket sector. During his tenure, the organisation reached an agreement with the government of New South Wales to trial a “super-complaints” system. Under the arrangement, evidence of systemic market failures submitted by Choice had to receive a formal response from the state consumer authority within 90 days.

== Institutional and social leadership ==
In 2012, Stace became the first chief executive and secretary of the Royal College of Veterinary Surgeons (RCVS). During his five-year tenure, the organisation obtained a new Royal Charter and undertook reforms to its governance and the regulation of veterinary nurses. It also introduced an alternative dispute resolution service and launched Mind Matters, a programme addressing mental health and wellbeing within the veterinary profession.

In 2017, he served as interim chair of governors of the Royal Agricultural University. That same year, he became UK chief executive of The King's Trust, then known as The Prince's Trust. His work there included programmes intended to improve social mobility by helping young people overcome barriers to skills, employment and career progression. In 2018, amid concerns about insecure employment and declining confidence among young people, he argued that government, charities and employers should invest more in developing young people's skills and provide opportunities for them to progress into fulfilling and sustainable careers.

In 2019, under his leadership, the Trust entered into a three-year partnership with the Department of Health and Social Care to help 10,000 young people enter employment or apprenticeships in the National Health Service. The government committed £20 million to the programme, with a further £7 million provided by the Trust.

Stace subsequently joined Saga as chief strategy officer and, in October 2020, became chief executive of Saga Travel. His appointment came during the disruption caused by the COVID-19 pandemic, and he oversaw preparations for the resumption of the company's cruise and tour operations under new health and safety protocols.

During his tenure, Saga named its new cruise ship Spirit of Adventure in Portsmouth on 19 July 2021, ahead of the vessel's inaugural voyage later that month.

== Sustainability and public service ==
After leaving Saga, he joined Barclays UK, where he led work on social purpose, sustainable finance and engagement with businesses making the transition to a low-carbon economy. This included support for climate-technology businesses and the development of initiatives intended to improve access to finance and business support for companies working on environmental technologies.

Stace co-chaired the UK government-backed Willow Review with then small business minister Gareth Thomas and entrepreneur Michelle Ovens. Published in June 2025, the review examined the commercial benefits for small and medium-sized businesses of adopting more sustainable practices and made recommendations on access to finance, practical advice and local business networks.

In December 2025, Howden Group announced his appointment to the newly created position of chief global impact officer, effective from January 2026. In this role, he was given responsibility for developing the insurance group's work on sustainability, resilience and social and environmental impact.

He also chairs the Howden Foundation, which supports communities in preparing for, adapting to and recovering from the effects of extreme weather events.

Alongside his executive career, he served as a non-executive director of the Financial Conduct Authority and as a trustee and council member of the National Trust. In July 2024, he succeeded James Timpson as chair of the Prison Reform Trust.

Stace was appointed an Officer of the Order of the British Empire (OBE) in the 2024 New Year Honours for services to consumers and the environment.

He holds an honorary doctorate from the University of Hull, awarded in 2019 in recognition of his public service.

Following his nomination for a Labour life peerage in July 2026, he was granted the title Baron Stace, of Brighton in the County of East Sussex, on 20 August. He was formally introduced to the House of Lords on 8 September 2026, supported by Baroness Smith of Basildon and Lord Timpson, and took the oath.
