= List of current members of the House of Lords =

This is a list of current members of the House of Lords, the upper house of the Parliament of the United Kingdom.

== Current sitting members ==
Current composition of the House of Lords
| Group | Sitting members |
| Conservative Party | 247 |
| Labour Party | 232 |
| Liberal Democrats | 79 |
| Democratic Unionist Party | 6 |
| Ulster Unionist Party | 3 |
| Green Party | 2 |
| Plaid Cymru | 2 |
| Independents | 1 |
| Non-affiliated | 44 |
| Crossbench | 154 |
| Lord Speaker | 1 |
| Lords Spiritual | 25 |
Last updated: 31 October 2026Total number of sitting members: 796; Non-sitting members:19

Diagram of the current composition of the House of Lords

=== Lords Spiritual ===
Up to 26 bishops of the Church of England sit in the House of Lords as Lords Spiritual. Five bishops are members of the Lords ex officio: the archbishop of Canterbury, the archbishop of York, the bishop of London, the bishop of Durham and the bishop of Winchester. The remaining 21 seats are filled by the most senior diocesan bishops by length of service (with the exception of the bishop in Europe and the bishop of Sodor and Man). Until May 2030, female bishops take precedence over men to become new Lords Spiritual for the 21 seats allocated by seniority, as provided for by the Lords Spiritual (Women) Act 2015.

| Bishopric | Name | Summoned to Lords | Diocesan bishop as of |
|---|---|---|---|
| Lord Archbishop of Canterbury | Sarah Mullally | 10 April 2018 (Note: Mullally was first a Lord Spiritual ex officio as Bishop of London from 2018, continuing as such on her translation to Archbishop of Canterbury on 28 January 2026.) | 2018 |
| Lord Archbishop of York | Stephen Cottrell | 10 February 2014 (Note: Cottrell was a Lord Spiritual by seniority of service as Bishop of Chelmsford from 2014, continuing ex officio on his translation to Archbishop of York in 2020.) | 2010 |
| Lord Bishop of London | Vacant | | |
| Lord Bishop of Durham | Rick Simpson | 23 July 2026 | 2026 |
| Lord Bishop of Winchester | Philip Mounstephen | 15 November 2023 | 2023 |
| Lord Bishop of Bath and Wells | Michael Beasley | 18 August 2026 | 2022 |
| Lord Bishop of Birmingham | Michael Volland | 15 October 2026 | 2023 |
| Lord Bishop of Blackburn | Philip North | 15 October 2026 | 2023 |
| Lord Bishop of Chelmsford | Guli Francis-Dehqani | 25 June 2021 (Note: Entered the House under the provisions of the Lords Spiritual (Women) Act 2015.) | 2021 |
| Lord Bishop of Chester | Mark Tanner | 19 June 2025 | 2020 |
| Lord Bishop of Coventry | Sophie Jelley | 18 March 2025 | 2025 |
| Lord Bishop of Derby | Libby Lane | 28 March 2019 | 2019 |
| Lord Bishop of Ely | Sarah Clark | 23 July 2026 | 2026 |
| Lord Bishop of Gloucester | Rachel Treweek | 7 September 2015 | 2015 |
| Lord Bishop of Hereford | Richard Jackson | 15 November 2023 | 2020 |
| Lord Bishop of Leicester | Martyn Snow | 6 October 2022 | 2013 |
| Lord Bishop of Manchester | David Walker | 28 July 2020 | 2013 |
| Lord Bishop of Newcastle | Helen-Ann Hartley | 21 September 2023 | 2023 |
| Lord Bishop of Norwich | Graham Usher | 17 October 2023 | 2014 |
| Lord Bishop of Peterborough | Debbie Sellin | 18 October 2024 | 2023 |
| Lord Bishop of Portsmouth | Jonathan Frost | 8 September 2025 | 2022 |
| Lord Bishop of Rochester | Jonathan Gibbs | 13 August 2026 | 2022 |
| Lord Bishop of Salisbury | Stephen Lake | 23 July 2026 | 2022 |
| Lord Bishop of Sheffield | Pete Wilcox | 17 January 2023 | 2017 |
| Lord Bishop of Southwell and Nottingham | Paul Williams | 19 April 2022 | 2015 |
| Lord Bishop of St Edmundsbury and Ipswich | Joanne Grenfell | 12 December 2025 | 2025 |

=== Lords Temporal ===
Other members of the House of Lords are collectively known as Lords Temporal, in contrast to the Lords Spiritual. Since April 2026, all Lords Temporal have been life peers, and all but five (discussed below) hold their peerages pursuant to the Life Peerages Act 1958.

Lords of Appeal in Ordinary, colloquially known as Law Lords, were judges appointed to the House of Lords to carry out the House's judicial functions under the Appellate Jurisdiction Act 1876 and were entitled to sit in House for life, including following active judicial service. The Constitutional Reform Act 2005 replaced the law lords with the Supreme Court of the United Kingdom in 2009. No new law life peers have been created since 2009 but the five remaining law life peers from prior to 2009 (whose appointments are noted in the list below with a ^{♎︎︎}) continue to sit in the Lords without having been created peers pursuant to the Life Peerages Act 1958.

In previous eras, the entirety, the majority or a defined minority of Lords Temporal were hereditary peers. From 1999 to 2026, a group of "excepted hereditary peers" sat pursuant to section 2 of the House of Lords Act 1999. Their ability to sit in the House of Lords was revoked by the House of Lords (Hereditary Peers) Act 2026.

Key
| ‡ | Indicates peer who returned to the House after leaving it |

| Peer | Date joined | Party | Notes |
|---|---|---|---|
| Baroness Adams of Craigielea | 28 June 2005 | Labour | Former MP for Paisley North (1990–2005) |
| Lord Addington | 17 June 1986 | Liberal Democrat | Hereditary peer who sits by virtue of a life peerage, Baron Hubbard; President of the British Dyslexia Association; former excepted hereditary peer (1999–2026) |
| Lord Adebowale | 30 June 2001 | Crossbench | Former chief executive of Turning Point, chair of the NHS Confederation |
| Lord Adonis | 16 May 2005 | Labour | Former Secretary of State for Transport (2009–2010), former chairman of European Movement UK (2021–2022) |
| Baroness Aglionby | 1 September 2026 | Liberal Democrat | Executive Director of the Foundation for Common Land (since 2012) |
| Lord Agnew of Oulton | 19 October 2017 | Conservative | Former Minister of State for Efficiency and Transformation (2020–2022), former Parliamentary Under-Secretary of State for School System (2017–2020), founder of the Inspiration Trust |
| Lord Ahmad of Wimbledon | 13 January 2011 | Conservative | Former Merton London Borough Councillor for Wimbledon Park (2002–2014), former Minister of State for the Middle East, North Africa, South Asia and United Nations (2017–2024) |
| Lord Alderdice | 8 October 1996 | Liberal Democrat | Former Speaker of the Northern Ireland Assembly (1998–2004), former MLA for Belfast East (1998–2003), former member of Belfast City Council (1989–1997), former president of Liberal International (2005–2009) and former leader of the Alliance Party of Northern Ireland (1987–1998) |
| Baroness Alexander of Cleveden | 3 February 2025 | Labour | Former MSP for Paisley North (1999–2011), former Leader of the Scottish Labour Party (2007–2008) |
| Lord Allan of Hallam | 22 July 2010 | Non-affiliated | Former MP for Sheffield Hallam (1997–2005) |
| Lord Allen of Kensington | 2 October 2013 | Labour | Businessman, chairman of THG plc, Global Radio and 2 Sisters Food Group, former chairman of EMI, former chief executive of Granada Group and ITV plc |
| Lord Alli | 18 July 1998 | Labour | Media entrepreneur, co-creator of Survivor, former chancellor of De Montfort University, first openly gay peer in parliament |
| Baroness Altmann | 19 May 2015 | Non-affiliated | Former Minister of State for Pensions (2015–2016) |
| Lord Alton of Liverpool | 12 June 1997 | Crossbench | Former MP for Liverpool Edge Hill (1979–1983) and for Liverpool Mossley Hill (1983–1997) |
| Lord Altrincham ‡ | 2 June 2026 (Note: Lord Altrincham was previously a member of the House by virtue of his hereditary peerage from 23 June 2021 to 29 April 2026.) | Conservative | Hereditary peer who sits by virtue of a life peerage, Baron Altrincham of Islington; Banker, non-executive director of The Co-operative Bank; former excepted hereditary peer (2021–2026) |
| Baroness Amos | 24 September 1997 | Labour | Former UN Under-Secretary-General for Humanitarian Affairs and Emergency Relief Coordinator, former Secretary of State for International Development, former British High Commissioner to Australia, and former Leader of the House of Lords |
| Lord Anderson of Ipswich | 10 July 2018 | Crossbench | Barrister, former Independent Reviewer of Terrorism Legislation (2011–2017) |
| Baroness Anderson of Stoke-on-Trent | 18 November 2022 | Labour | Former MP for Stoke-on-Trent North (2015–2019) |
| Lord Anderson of Swansea | 28 June 2005 | Labour | Former MP for Swansea East (1974–2005) |
| Baroness Andrews | 9 May 2000 | Labour | Former senior researcher in the House of Commons Library (1970–1985), former parliamentary under-secretary of state at the Department for Children, Schools and Families, former chair of English Heritage (2009–2013) |
| Baroness Anelay of St Johns | 14 October 1996 | Conservative | Former Minister of State for Foreign and Commonwealth Affairs, and former Government Chief Whip in the Lords |
| Baroness Antrobus | 28 January 2026 | Labour | Co-director of the Freeman Air and Space Institute at King's College London |
| Lord Arbuthnot of Edrom | 1 October 2015 | Conservative | Former MP for Wanstead & Woodford (1987–1997) and for North East Hampshire (1997–2015) |
| Baroness Armstrong of Hill Top | 18 June 2010 | Labour | Former MP for North West Durham (1987–2010) |
| Lord Ashcombe ‡ | 11 June 2026 (Note: Lord Ashcombe was previously a member of the House by virtue of his hereditary peerage from 28 October 2022 to 29 April 2026.) | Conservative | Hereditary peer who sits by virtue of a life peerage, Baron Ashcombe of Boldre; Insurance broker and civil engineer; former excepted hereditary peer (2022–2026). |
| Baroness Ashley of Lambeth | 2 September 2026 | Labour | Chief Executive of Family Rights Group (since 2004) |
| Baroness Ashton of Upholland | 2 August 1999 | Labour | Former High Representative for Foreign Affairs and Security Policy of the European Union, First-Vice-President of the European Commission, European Commissioner for Trade, Leader of the House of Lords, and Lord President of the Council |
| Lord Austin of Dudley | 2 September 2020 | Non-affiliated | Former MP for Dudley North (2005–2019) |
| Lord Babudu | 16 January 2026 | Labour | Former councillor for Rye Lane on Southwark London Borough Council |
| Lord Bach | 27 July 1998 | Labour | Former parliamentary under-secretary of state in several departments and former Minister of State for Defence Procurement |
| Lord Bailey of Paddington | 10 July 2023 | Conservative | Member of the London Assembly (since 2016), journalist and political adviser |
| Lord Baker of Dorking | 16 June 1997 | Conservative | Former MP for Acton (1968–1970), St Marylebone (1970–1983) and Mole Valley (1983–1997), former Home Secretary (1990–1992), Secretary of State for Education and Science and of the Environment |
| Baroness Bakewell | 21 January 2011 | Labour | Writer and broadcaster |
| Baroness Bakewell of Hardington Mandeville | 9 September 2013 | Liberal Democrat | Councillor on South Somerset District Council |
| Lord Balfe | 19 September 2013 | Conservative | Former Member of the European Parliament for London (1979–2004) |
| Lord Banner | 6 March 2024 | Conservative | Barrister |
| Lord Barber of Ainsdale | 20 January 2025 | Labour | Trade unionist, General Secretary of the Trades Union Congress (2003–2012) |
| Lord Barber of Chittlehampton | 21 January 2026 | Labour | Former head of the Prime Minister's Delivery Unit (2001–2005), Chancellor of University of Exeter (since 2022), chairman of Somerset County Cricket Club (since 2022) |
| Baroness Barker | 31 July 1999 | Liberal Democrat | Liberal Democrats spokesperson on Health |
| Lord Barker of Battle | 12 October 2015 | Conservative | Former MP for Bexhill and Battle (2001–2015) |
| Baroness Barran | 21 June 2018 | Conservative | Former hedgefund manager |
| Lord Barrow | 18 July 2025 | Crossbench | Diplomat, former British Ambassador to the European Union (2017–2021), British Ambassador to Russia (2011–2016), British Ambassador to Ukraine (2006–2008) |
| Lord Barwell | 7 October 2019 | Non-affiliated | Former Downing Street Chief of Staff and former MP for Croydon Central (2010–2017) |
| Lord Bassam of Brighton | 3 November 1997 | Labour Co-op | Former Labour Chief Whip in the Lords. Former leader of Brighton Council |
| Lord Bates | 30 June 2008 | Conservative | Former MP for Langbaurgh (1992–1997) |
| Baroness Batters | 16 August 2024 | Crossbench | Former president of the National Farmers' Union of England and Wales (2018–2024) |
| Lord Beamish | 15 August 2024 | Labour | Former MP for North Durham (2001–2024) |
| Baroness Beckett | 14 August 2024 | Labour | Former Foreign Secretary (2006–2007), Former MP for Lincoln (1974–1979) and for Derby South (1983–2024) |
| Lord Beith | 19 October 2015 | Liberal Democrat | Former MP for Berwick-upon-Tweed (1973–2015) |
| Lord Bellamy | 14 June 2022 | Conservative | Parliamentary Under-Secretary of State for Justice |
| Lord Bellingham | 5 November 2020 | Conservative | Former MP for North West Norfolk (1983–1997, 2001–2019) |
| Baroness Benjamin | 26 June 2010 | Liberal Democrat | Actress, author and television presenter |
| Baroness Bennett of Manor Castle | 7 October 2019 | Green | Former Leader of the Green Party of England and Wales |
| Lord Benyon | 26 January 2021 | Crossbench | Lord Chamberlain and former MP for Newbury (2005–2019) |
| Baroness Berger | 6 February 2025 | Labour | Former MP for Liverpool Wavertree (2010–2019) |
| Lord Berkeley ‡ | 18 April 2000 (Note: Lord Berkeley was previously a member of the House by virtue of his hereditary peerage from 1992 until the House of Lords Act in 1999.) | Labour | Hereditary peer who sits by virtue of a life peerage, Baron Gueterbock |
| Lord Berkeley of Knighton | 26 March 2013 | Crossbench | Composer and music broadcaster |
| Baroness Berridge | 18 January 2011 | Conservative | Former executive director of the Conservative Christian Fellowship |
| Baroness Bertin | 2 September 2016 | Conservative | Former deputy press officer for David Cameron |
| Lord Best | 4 June 2001 | Crossbench | President of the Local Government Association |
| Lord Bew | 26 March 2007 | Crossbench | Professor of Irish politics at Queen's University Belfast |
| Baroness Bi | 19 January 2026 | Labour | Solicitor |
| Lord Bichard | 24 March 2010 | Crossbench | Former permanent secretary for the Department for Education (and later the Department for Education and Employment) |
| Lord Biggar | 21 January 2025 | Conservative | Anglican priest, Regius Professor of Moral and Pastoral Theology at the University of Oxford (2007–2022) |
| Lord Bilimoria | 16 June 2006 | Crossbench | Founder and chairman of Cobra Beer |
| Lord Bird | 30 October 2015 | Crossbench | Social entrepreneur and founder of The Big Issue |
| Lord Birt | 11 February 2000 | Crossbench | Former director-general of the BBC |
| Lord Black of Brentwood | 9 July 2010 | Conservative | Executive Director of the Telegraph Media Group |
| Baroness Black of Strome | 26 April 2021 | Crossbench | Professor and forensic anthropologist |
| Baroness Blackstone | 18 March 1987 | Labour | Former Minister for Education and Minister for the Arts |
| Lord Blackwater | 27 January 2026 | Conservative | Historian |
| Lord Blackwell | 2 October 1997 | Conservative | Head of the Prime Minister's Policy Unit under the government of John Major from 1995 to 1997 |
| Baroness Blackwood of North Oxford | 1 February 2019 | Conservative | Former MP for Oxford West and Abingdon (2010–2017) |
| Baroness Blake of Leeds | 1 February 2021 | Labour | Former Leader of Leeds City Council |
| Lord Blencathra | 28 February 2011 | Conservative | Former MP for Penrith and The Border (1983–2010), former Minister of State for Home Affairs and former opposition chief whip |
| Baroness Bloomfield of Hinton Waldrist | 5 September 2016 | Conservative | Former political organizer |
| Baroness Blower | 15 October 2019 | Labour | Former general secretary of the National Union of Teachers |
| Lord Blunkett | 28 September 2015 | Labour | Former MP for Sheffield Brightside (1987–2015), former Cabinet minister(1997–2004, 2005), former Home Secretary |
| Lord Boateng | 27 June 2010 | Labour | Former MP for Brent South (1987–2005), Chief Secretary to the Treasury and British High Commissioner to South Africa |
| Baroness Bonham-Carter of Yarnbury | 23 June 2004 | Liberal Democrat | Lead Liberal Democrats spokesperson on Culture, Media and Sport in the House of Lords |
| Lord Booth | 7 March 2024 | Conservative | Businessman, chairman of the National Conservative Convention |
| Lord Booth-Smith | 21 August 2024 | Conservative | Downing Street Chief of Staff under Rishi Sunak |
| Lord Botham | 10 September 2020 | Crossbench | Cricket commentator, former professional cricketer, chairman of Durham County Cricket Club (since 2017) |
| Baroness Bottomley of Nettlestone | 24 June 2005 | Conservative | Former MP for South West Surrey (1984–2005), Secretary of State for Health and Secretary of State for National Heritage |
| Lord Bourne of Aberystwyth | 9 September 2013 | Conservative | Former leader of the Welsh Conservative Party and member of the National Assembly for Wales from 1999 to 2011 |
| Baroness Bousted | 27 January 2025 | Labour | Trade unionist, General Secretary of the National Education Union (2017–2023) and President of the Trades Union Congress (2017) |
| Baroness Bowles of Berkhamsted | 23 October 2015 | Liberal Democrat | Former member of the European Parliament for South East England |
| Lord Bowness | 17 January 1996 | Crossbench | Former leader of Croydon London Borough Council |
| Baroness Boycott | 9 July 2018 | Crossbench | Journalist |
| Lord Boyd of Duncansby | 14 June 2006 | Crossbench | Former judge, Outer House of the Court of Session in the Supreme Courts of Scotland |
| Lord Bradley | 12 June 2006 | Labour | Former MP for Manchester Withington (1987–2005) |
| Lord Bradshaw | 22 July 1999 | Liberal Democrat | Liberal Democrats spokesperson on transport in the House of Lords |
| Baroness Brady | 22 September 2014 | Conservative | Vice-chairman of West Ham United FC, TV personality and senior non-executive director of the Syco and Arcadia brands |
| Lord Brady of Altrincham | 19 August 2024 | Conservative | Former MP for Altrincham and Sale West (1997–2024), former chairman of the 1922 Committee (2010–2019, 2019–2024) |
| Baroness Bray of Coln | 8 November 2022 | Conservative | Former MP for Ealing Central and Acton (2010–2015), former member of the London Assembly for West Central (2000–2008), radio journalist |
| Lord Brennan | 2 May 2000 | Non-affiliated | Chair of the APPG on Legal and Constitutional Affairs |
| Lord Brennan of Canton | 24 January 2025 | Labour | Former MP for Cardiff West (2001–2024) |
| Lord Bridges of Headley | 28 May 2015 | Conservative | Parliamentary Secretary for the Cabinet Office |
| Baroness Brinton | 4 February 2011 | Liberal Democrat | Executive Director of the Association of Universities in the East of England |
| Lord Brooke of Alverthorpe | 23 October 1997 | Labour | Former general secretary of the Inland Revenue Staff Federation and former joint-general secretary of the Public Services Tax and Commerce Union |
| Baroness Brown of Cambridge | 30 October 2015 | Crossbench | Vice-Chancellor of Aston University |
| Baroness Brown of Silvertown | 23 January 2025 | Labour | Former MP for West Ham (2005–2024) |
| Lord Browne of Belmont | 12 June 2006 | Democratic Unionist | Former Member of the Legislative Assembly for Belfast East (2007–2011) |
| Lord Browne of Madingley | 28 June 2001 | Crossbench | Former chief executive of BP (1995–2007) |
| Baroness Browning | 9 July 2010 | Conservative | Former MP for Tiverton and Honiton (1997–2010) |
| Lord Brownlow of Shurlock Row | 9 October 2019 | Conservative | Businessman |
| Lord Bruce of Bennachie | 19 October 2015 | Liberal Democrat | Former MP for Gordon from 1983 to 2015, president of the Scottish Liberal Democrats |
| Baroness Bull | 11 July 2018 | Crossbench | Former ballet dancer and writer |
| Lord Burnett | 31 May 2006 | Liberal Democrat | Former MP for Torridge and West Devon from 1997 to 2005 |
| Lord Burnett of Maldon | 30 October 2017 | Crossbench | Former Lord Chief Justice of England and Wales (2017–2023) |
| Lord Burns | 20 July 1998 | Crossbench | Former chief economic advisor and permanent secretary at the treasury |
| Baroness Buscombe | 23 July 1998 | Conservative | Chair of the Press Complaints Commission |
| Lord Butler of Brockwell | 12 February 1998 | Crossbench | Former Cabinet Secretary and Head of the Home Civil Service |
| Baroness Butler-Sloss | 13 June 2006 | Crossbench | Former Lady Justice of Appeal and former president of the Family Division of the High Court |
| Lord Caine | 2 September 2016 | Conservative | Former political aide |
| Baroness Caine of Kentish Town | 30 January 2025 | Labour | Creative industries expert |
| Lord Callanan | 24 September 2014 | Conservative | Former MEP for North East England (1999–2014) |
| Lord Cameron of Chipping Norton | 17 November 2023 | Conservative | Former prime minister (2010–2016), former Foreign Secretary (2023–2024), former MP for Witney (2001–2016), former Leader of the Opposition (2005–2010) |
| Lord Cameron of Dillington | 29 June 2004 | Crossbench | President of the Guild of Agricultural Journalists, former chair of the Countryside Agency |
| Lord Cameron of Lochiel | 4 March 2024 | Conservative | Chief of Clan Cameron, former MSP for Highlands and Islands (2016–2024) |
| Lord Camoys ‡ | 17 June 2026 (Note: Lord Camoys was previously a member of the House by virtue of his hereditary peerage from 28 November 2023 to 29 April 2026.) | Conservative | Hereditary peer who sits by virtue of a life peerage, Baron Stonor; Entrepreneur; former excepted hereditary peer (2023–2026) |
| Baroness Campbell of Loughborough | 10 November 2008 | Crossbench | Chairman of UK Sport |
| Baroness Campbell of Surbiton | 30 March 2007 | Crossbench | Commissioner of the Equality and Human Rights Commission, former chair of the Social Care Institute for Excellence and former commissioner of the Disability Rights Commission |
| Lord Campbell-Savours | 4 July 2001 | Labour | Former MP for Workington (1979–2001) |
| Viscount Camrose ‡ | 12 June 2026 (Note: Viscount Camrose was previously a member of the House by virtue of his hereditary peerage from 6 April 2022 to 29 April 2026.) | Conservative | Hereditary peer who sits by virtue of a life peerage, Baron Berry; Business manager and consultant; former excepted hereditary peer (2022–2026) |
| Baroness Carberry of Muswell Hill | 30 January 2025 | Labour | Trade unionist, Assistant General Secretary of the Trades Union Congress (2003–2016) |
| Lord Carey of Clifton ‡ | 1 November 2002 (Note: Lord Carey of Clifton was previously a member of the House as an ex officio Lord Spiritual while Archbishop of Canterbury from 1991 to 2002.) | Crossbench | Former Archbishop of Canterbury |
| Lord Carlile of Berriew | 27 July 1999 | Crossbench | Deputy High Court judge, former independent reviewer of terrorism legislation, president of the Howard League for Penal Reform and former MP |
| Lord Carrington of Fulham | 11 September 2013 | Conservative | Former MP for Fulham (1987–1997) |
| Lord Carter of Coles | 8 June 2004 | Labour | Chairman of the NHS Pathology review panel |
| Lord Carter of Haslemere | 30 October 2019 | Crossbench | Lawyer |
| Baroness Casey of Blackstock | 30 October 2020 | Crossbench | Former Victims' Commissioner |
| Baroness Cash | 28 January 2025 | Conservative | Barrister |
| Lord Cashman | 23 September 2014 | Non-affiliated | Former MEP for West Midlands, former actor |
| Baroness Cass | 22 August 2024 | Crossbench | Paediatrician, author of the Cass Review, former president of the Royal College of Paediatrics and Child Health |
| Baroness Cavendish of Little Venice | 6 September 2016 | Crossbench | Journalist, academic and former director of the Number 10 Policy Unit |
| Baroness Chakrabarti | 6 September 2016 | Labour | Former director of Liberty |
| Viscount Chandos ‡ | 19 April 2000 (Note: Viscount Chandos was previously a member of the House by virtue of his hereditary peerage from 1980 until the House of Lords Act in 1999.) | Labour | Hereditary peer who sits by virtue of a life peerage, Baron Lyttelton of Aldershot |
| Baroness Chapman of Darlington | 1 February 2021 | Labour | Former MP for Darlington (2010–2019) |
| Lord Chartres ‡ | 7 November 2017 (Note: Lord Chartres was previously a member of the House as an ex officio Lord Spiritual while Bishop of London from 1995 to 2017.) | Crossbench | Former Bishop of London |
| Baroness Chisholm of Owlpen | 16 September 2014 | Non-affiliated | Queen's companion, former spokesperson for the Cabinet Office |
| Lord Choudrey | 9 October 2019 | Conservative | Businessman and philanthropist |
| Lord Clancarty ‡ | 4 June 2026 (Note: The Earl of Clancarty was previously a member of the House by virtue of his hereditary peerage in the Peerage of the United Kingdom, Viscount Clancarty, from 29 March 1996 to 11 November 1999, and again from 28 June 2010 to 29 April 2026.) | Crossbench | Hereditary peer (the title Earl of Clancarty is in the Peerage of Ireland) who sits by virtue of a life peerage, Baron Clancarty of the Hangers; former excepted hereditary peer (2010–2026) |
| Baroness Clark of Calton | 21 June 2005 | Crossbench | Former MP for Edinburgh Pentlands (1997–2005) and judge of the Inner House of the Court of Session in the Supreme Courts of Scotland |
| Lord Clark of Windermere | 2 July 2001 | Labour | Former MP for Colne Valley (1970–1974) and for South Shields (1979–2001) and chair of the Forestry Commission |
| Lord Clarke of Nottingham | 4 September 2020 | Conservative | Former MP for Rushcliffe (1970–2019), Lord Chancellor, Chancellor of the Exchequer and Home Secretary |
| Lord Clement-Jones | 17 July 1998 | Liberal Democrat | Former head of legal services and legal director of London Weekend Television and Grand Metropolitan respectively and former group secretary of Kingfisher plc, chairman of Environmental Context Ltd |
| Lord Coaker | 3 February 2021 | Labour Co-op | Former MP for Gedling (1997–2019) |
| Baroness Coffey | 17 January 2025 | Conservative | Former MP for Suffolk Coastal (2010–2024), Deputy Prime Minister (2022) |
| Lord Collins of Highbury | 20 January 2011 | Labour | General Secretary of the Labour Party (2008–2011) |
| Lord Colville of Culross ‡ | 8 June 2026 (Note: Viscount Colville of Culross was previously a member of the House by virtue of his hereditary peerage from 25 July 2011 to 29 April 2026.) | Crossbench | Hereditary peer who sits by virtue of a life peerage, Baron Colville of Waveney; Television producer and director; former excepted hereditary peer (2011–2026) |
| Lord Cooper of Windrush | 17 September 2014 | Non-affiliated | Co-founder of the research and strategy consultancy Populus Ltd, former Director of Strategy in the Cameron–Clegg coalition |
| Lord Courtown ‡ | 11 June 2026 (Note: The Earl of Courtown was previously a member of the House by virtue of his hereditary peerage in the Peerage of Great Britain, Baron Saltersford, from 24 July 1979 to 29 April 2026.) | Conservative | Hereditary peer (the title Earl of Courtown is in the Peerage of Ireland) who sits by virtue of a life peerage, Baron Stopford of Saltersford; former excepted hereditary peer (1999–2026) |
| Baroness Coussins | 23 March 2007 | Crossbench | Former chief executive of the Portman Group |
| Baroness Cox | 24 January 1983 | Crossbench | Founder of Christian Solidarity Worldwide, former chancellor of Bournemouth University and of Liverpool Hope University, former nurse and sociology lecturer, Longest-serving member of the House of Lords |
| Lord Craig of Radley | 30 July 1991 | Crossbench | Former Chief of the Defence Staff |
| Baroness Crawley | 24 July 1998 | Labour | Former chair of the Women's National Commission |
| Lord Crisp | 28 April 2006 | Crossbench | Former chief executive of the NHS |
| Lord Cromwell ‡ | 1 June 2026 (Note: Lord Cromwell was previously a member of the House by virtue of his hereditary peerage from 18 August 1982 to 11 November 1999, and again from 10 April 2014 to 29 April 2026.) | Crossbench | Hereditary peer who sits by virtue of a life peerage, Baron Cromwell of Tattershall; Businessman, executive chair of Banking Competition Remedies Ltd; former excepted hereditary peer (2014–2026) |
| Lord Cruddas | 27 January 2021 | Conservative | Banker, businessman and former Conservative Party co-treasurer |
| Lord Cryer | 15 August 2024 | Labour | Former MP for Hornchurch (1997–2005) and Leyton and Wanstead (2010–2024) |
| Baroness Curran | 15 January 2025 | Labour | Former MP for Glasgow East (2010–2015), former MSP for Glasgow Baillieston (1999–2011) |
| Lord Currie of Marylebone | 1 October 1996 | Crossbench | Former chairman of Ofcom |
| Baroness D'Souza | 1 July 2004 | Crossbench | Former Lord Speaker, formerly Convenor of the Crossbench peers |
| Baroness Dacres of Lewisham | 7 January 2026 | Labour | Mayor of Lewisham (2024–2026) |
| Lord Dannatt | 19 January 2011 | Crossbench | Former Chief of the General Staff of the British Army |
| Lord Darroch of Kew | 11 November 2019 | Crossbench | Former British Ambassador to the United States |
| Lord Darzi of Denham | 12 July 2007 | Non-affiliated | Professor of surgery at Imperial College London |
| Lord Davey of Chalk Farm | 26 August 2026 | Labour | CEO and artistic director of the Roundhouse (1999–2025) |
| Lord Davidson of Glen Clova | 22 March 2006 | Labour | Former Advocate General for Scotland, author of Judicial Review in Scotland, and the International Commission of Jurists' chef de mission for Egypt in 1998 |
| Baroness Davidson of Lundin Links | 16 July 2021 | Conservative | Former Leader of the Scottish Conservative Party |
| Lord Davies of Brixton | 18 September 2020 | Labour | Former trade unionist, actuary and member of the Greater London Council |
| Baroness Davies of Devonport | 15 January 2026 | Conservative | Swimmer |
| Lord Davies of Gower | 10 October 2019 | Conservative | Former MP for Gower (2015–2017) |
| Lord Dear | 15 June 2006 | Crossbench | Former HM Inspector of Constabulary and former chief constable of West Midlands police |
| Baroness Debbonaire | 7 February 2025 | Labour | Former MP for Bristol West (2015–2024) |
| Lord Deben | 21 June 2010 | Conservative | Former MP for Lewisham West (1970–1974), for Eye (1979–1983) and for Suffolk Coastal (1983–2010) and Secretary of State for the Environment 1993–97; former chairman of environment consultancy company Sancroft International and of Veolia Water |
| Baroness Deech | 5 October 2005 | Crossbench | Chair of the House of Lords Appointments Commission (since 2023), former chair of the Human Fertilisation and Embryology Authority (1994–2002), former Principal of St Anne's College, Oxford (2001–2004), former professor of law at Gresham College, former chair of the Bar Standards Board |
| Lord de Mauley ‡ | 5 June 2026 (Note: Lord de Mauley was previously a member of the House by virtue of his hereditary peerage from 15 March 2005 to 29 April 2026.) | Conservative | Hereditary peer who sits by virtue of a life peerage, Baron de Mauley of Canford; Master of the Horse, Royal Wessex Yeomanry officer; former excepted hereditary peer (2005–2026) |
| Lord Deighton | 1 November 2012 | Conservative | Chief executive, London Organising Committee of the Olympic and Paralympic Games |
| Lord Dholakia | 24 October 1997 | Liberal Democrat | Chair of Nacro |
| Lord Dixon of Jericho | 28 January 2026 | Liberal Democrat | CEO of the Liberal Democrats |
| Lord Dobbs | 18 December 2010 | Conservative | Author |
| Lord Docherty of Milngavie | 12 January 2026 | Non-affiliated | Business and education executive |
| Lord Dodds of Duncairn | 18 September 2020 | Democratic Unionist | Former MP for Belfast North (2001–2019) |
| Baroness Donaghy | 26 June 2010 | Labour | Former chair of ACAS, President of the Trades Union Congress (2000) |
| Lord Donoughue | 21 May 1985 | Labour | Visiting Professor of Government at the London School of Economics |
| Baroness Doocey | 21 December 2010 | Liberal Democrat | Chair of the London Assembly and has run DD Enterprises Management Consultancy |
| Lord Douglas-Miller | 15 December 2023 | Conservative | Former Parliamentary Under-Secretary of State for Biosecurity, Animal Health and Welfare |
| Lord Doyle | 8 January 2026 | Non-affiliated | Political adviser, former Downing Street Director of Communications (2024–2025) |
| Baroness Drake | 20 June 2010 | Labour | President of the Trades Union Congress (2005) and commissioner at the Equality and Human Rights Commission |
| Lord Drayson | 1 June 2004 | Labour | Co-founder and former chief executive of PowderJect Pharmaceuticals |
| Lord Dubs | 27 September 1994 | Labour | Former MP for Battersea South (1979–1983) and for Battersea (1983–1987), director of the Refugee Council, chair of Liberty and chair of the Broadcasting Standards Commission |
| Lord Duncan of Springbank | 14 July 2017 | Conservative | Former Under-Secretary of State for Scotland and former MEP for Scotland |
| Lord Duvall | 8 January 2026 | Labour | Member of the London Assembly for Greenwich and Lewisham (since 2000) |
| Lord Eames | 25 August 1995 | Crossbench | Former Church of Ireland Archbishop of Armagh |
| Baroness Eaton | 21 July 2010 | Conservative | Chairman of the Local Government Association |
| Lord Eatwell | 14 July 1992 | Labour | Former president of Queens' College, Cambridge (1996–2020), former professor of financial policy at Cambridge Judge Business School, former chair of the British Library Board (2001–2006) |
| Lord Effingham ‡ | 2 June 2026 (Note: The Earl of Effingham was previously a member of the House by virtue of his hereditary peerage from 28 October 2022 to 29 April 2026.) | Conservative | Hereditary peer who sits by virtue of a life peerage, Baron Effingham of Bookham Commons; Financier; former excepted hereditary peer (2022–2026) |
| Lord Elliott of Ballinamallard | 16 August 2024 | Ulster Unionist | Former MLA for Fermanagh and South Tyrone (2003–2015, 2022–2024), former MP for Fermanagh and South Tyrone (2015–2017), former Leader of the Ulster Unionist Party (2010–2012). |
| Lord Elliott of Mickle Fell | 6 February 2024 | Conservative | Political strategist and lobbyist, founder of TaxPayers' Alliance and Big Brother Watch, chief executive of Vote Leave and campaign director for NOtoAV |
| Baroness Elliott of Whitburn Bay | 27 January 2025 | Labour | Former MP for Sunderland Central (2010–2024) |
| Lord Empey | 15 January 2011 | Ulster Unionist | Former leader of the Ulster Unionist Party |
| Baroness Evans of Bowes Park | 12 September 2014 | Conservative | Leader of the House of Lords and Lord Privy Seal, former director of the New Schools Network and deputy director at Policy Exchange |
| Lord Evans of Guisborough | 6 February 2025 | Conservative | Former London Assembly member for Havering and Redbridge (2000–2016), former Deputy Mayor of London (2015–2016) |
| Lord Evans of Rainow | 9 November 2022 | Conservative | Former MP for Weaver Vale (2010–2017) |
| Lord Evans of Sealand | 17 January 2025 | Labour | General Secretary of the Labour Party (2020–2024) |
| Lord Evans of Watford | 28 July 1998 | Non-affiliated | Chairman of several publishing companies |
| Lord Evans of Weardale | 3 December 2014 | Crossbench | Former director of the Security Service |
| Baroness Fairhead | 19 October 2017 | Crossbench | Former chairman of the BBC Trust |
| Lord Falconer of Thoroton | 14 May 1997 | Labour | Former Lord Chancellor |
| Baroness Falkner of Margravine | 2 June 2004 | Crossbench | Chief executive of Student Partnerships Worldwide |
| Baroness Fall | 22 October 2015 | Conservative | Former Downing Street Deputy Chief of Staff |
| Lord Farmer | 5 September 2014 | Conservative | Founding partner of RK Mine Finance group, trustee of the Kingham Hill Trust and Conservative Party co-treasurer |
| Lord Faulkner of Worcester | 14 July 1999 | Labour | Communications advisor to the Leader of the Labour Party in the 1987, 1992 and 1997 general elections |
| Lord Faulks | 21 July 2010 | Non-affiliated | Recorder, chairman of the Independent Press Standards Organisation |
| Baroness Featherstone | 20 October 2015 | Liberal Democrat | Former MP for Hornsey and Wood Green (2005–2015) |
| Lord Filkin | 29 July 1999 | Labour | Former parliamentary under-secretary of state in various government departments |
| Lord Fink | 18 January 2011 | Conservative | CEO and chairman of the Man Group, the largest listed hedge fund company in the world |
| Lord Finkelstein | 11 September 2013 | Conservative | Current Executive Editor of The Times |
| Baroness Finlay of Llandaff | 28 June 2001 | Crossbench | Professor of Palliative Medicine at the Cardiff University School of Medicine and former president of the Royal Society of Medicine |
| Baroness Finn | 14 October 2015 | Conservative | Former special adviser at the Cabinet Office and the Department for Business, Innovation and Skills |
| Baroness Fleet | 15 September 2020 | Conservative | Chair of Arts Council London and former newspaper editor and political advisor |
| Baroness Fookes | 30 September 1997 | Conservative | Former MP for Merton and Morden (1970–1974) and for Plymouth Drake (1974–1997), chair of the RSPCA and deputy speaker of the House of Commons |
| Lord Forbes of Newcastle | 9 January 2026 | Labour | Former member of Newcastle City Council (2000–2022, leader 2011–2022) |
| Lord Forsyth of Drumlean | 14 July 1999 | Lord Speaker | Former MP for Stirling (1983–1997) and Secretary of State for Scotland |
| Baroness Foster of Aghadrumsee | 9 November 2022 | Non-affiliated | Former First Minister of Northern Ireland, former leader of the Democratic Unionist Party, broadcaster, presenter on GB News |
| Lord Foster of Bath | 7 October 2015 | Liberal Democrat | Former MP for Bath (1992–2015) |
| Baroness Foster of Oxton | 29 January 2021 | Conservative | Former MEP for North West England (1999–2004, 2009–2019) |
| Lord Foulkes of Cumnock | 16 June 2005 | Labour Co-op | Former MP for South Ayrshire (1979–1983) and for Carrick, Cumnock and Doon Valley (1983–2005), and MSP (2007–2011), former chairman of Hearts Football club and president of the Caribbean Council |
| Lord Fowler | 3 July 2001 | Crossbench | Former Lord Speaker, former chairman of the House of Lords Communications Select Committee and former MP |
| Lord Fox | 11 September 2014 | Liberal Democrat | PR director at GKN engineering and former Liberal Democrat chief executive |
| Baroness Fox of Buckley | 14 September 2020 | Non-affiliated | Former MEP for North West England (2019–2020) |
| Lord Framlingham | 14 January 2011 | Conservative | Former MP for Central Suffolk (1983–1997) and Deputy Speaker in the House of Commons |
| Baroness Fraser of Craigmaddie | 26 January 2021 | Conservative | Chief executive of Cerebral Palsy Scotland |
| Baroness Freeman of Steventon | 5 June 2024 | Crossbench | Science communicator and former television producer |
| Lord Frost | 12 August 2020 | Non-affiliated | Former Minister of State for EU Relations and British ambassador to Denmark |
| Baroness Fullbrook | 7 September 2020 | Conservative | Former MP for South Ribble (2010–2015) |
| Lord Fuller | 8 March 2024 | Conservative | Leader of South Norfolk District Council (2007–2024); Chairman Brineflow Ltd, Director Sentry Ltd, Member Local Government Pension Scheme Advisory Board (2014–present) |
| Lord Gadhia | 31 August 2016 | Non-affiliated | Investment banker and Conservative Party donor |
| Baroness Gale | 4 August 1999 | Labour | President of National Association of Old Age Pensioners, Wales and president of Treherbert and District British Legion |
| Baroness Garden of Frognal | 15 October 2007 | Liberal Democrat | Vice President of the Institute of Export |
| Lord Gardiner of Kimble | 23 June 2010 | Conservative | Former Senior Deputy Speaker and deputy chief executive of the Countryside Alliance |
| Baroness Garnham | 1 September 2026 | Labour | Chief Executive, Child Poverty Action Group (since 2010) |
| Lord Garnier | 22 June 2018 | Conservative | Former MP for Harborough (1992–2017) |
| Lord Gascoigne | 10 July 2023 | Conservative | Political adviser and secretary to Boris Johnson |
| Baroness Gerada | 24 November 2025 | Crossbench | Former president of the Royal College of General Practitioners |
| Lord German | 24 June 2010 | Liberal Democrat | Former Deputy First Minister of Wales |
| Lord Giddens | 16 June 2004 | Labour | Emeritus Professor at the London School of Economics of sociology and social theory with fifteen honorary degrees from other universities, author of The Politics of Climate Change |
| Lord Gilbert of Panteg | 30 September 2015 | Conservative | Deputy Chairman of the Conservative Party |
| Baroness Gill | 14 January 2026 | Labour | MEP for the West Midlands (1999–2009; 2014–2020) |
| Lord Glasman | 4 February 2011 | Labour | Senior lecturer in political theory at London Metropolitan University |
| Lord Goddard of Stockport | 15 September 2014 | Liberal Democrat | Former leader of Stockport Council |
| Lord Godson | 25 January 2021 | Conservative | Chair of Policy Exchange and former political aide, political candidate, author and journalist |
| Baroness Gohir | 24 June 2022 | Crossbench | Women's rights campaigner, CEO of Muslim Women's Network UK |
| Lord Gold | 1 February 2011 | Conservative | Lawyer |
| Baroness Goldie | 3 October 2013 | Conservative | Former leader of the Scottish Conservative Party in the Scottish Parliament (2005–2011) |
| Baroness Golding | 13 July 2001 | Labour | Radiographer and former MP |
| Lord Goldsmith | 29 July 1999 | Labour | Former Attorney General for England and Wales |
| Lord Goldsmith of Richmond Park | 7 January 2020 | Conservative | Former MP for Richmond Park, Minister of State for Environment and International Development |
| Lord Goodman of Wycombe | 11 March 2024 | Conservative | Former MP for Wycombe (2001–2010), journalist, editor of the political blog ConservativeHome, former news editor at Catholic Herald, former lead writer with The Daily Telegraph |
| Lord Goschen ‡ | 5 June 2026 (Note: Viscount Goschen was previously a member of the House by virtue of his hereditary peerage from 15 July 1988 to 29 April 2026.) | Conservative | Hereditary peer who sits by virtue of a life peerage, Baron Hawkhurst; Former stockbroker and conservationist; former excepted hereditary peer (1999–2026) |
| Baroness Goudie | 21 July 1998 | Labour | Activist, former European director of public affairs for the World Wide Fund for Nature |
| Lord Gove | 13 May 2025 | Conservative | Former MP for Surrey Heath (2005–2024), Secretary of State for Education (2010–2014), and Secretary of State for Levelling Up, Housing and Communities (2021–2024) |
| Lord Grabiner | 26 July 1999 | Crossbench | Head of Chambers at One Essex Court and deputy High Court Judge |
| Lord Grade of Yarmouth | 25 January 2011 | Conservative | Former chairman of the BBC Board of Governors |
| Baroness Grainger | 20 April 2026 | Crossbench | Former Olympic athlete and Chair of the British Olympic Association (since 2024) |
| Lord Grantchester ‡ | 15 June 2026 (Note: Lord Grantchester was previously a member of the House by virtue of his hereditary peerage from 27 November 1995 to 11 November 1999, and again from 31 October 2003 to 29 April 2026.) | Labour | Hereditary peer who sits by virtue of a life peerage, Baron Grantchester of Audlem; Former director of Littlewoods and former chairman of the Dairy Farmers of Britain; former excepted hereditary peer (2003–2026) |
| Baroness Gray of Tottenham | 4 February 2025 | Labour | Civil servant, former Downing Street Chief of Staff (2024), former Chief of Staff to the Leader of the Opposition (2023–2024) |
| Lord Grayling | 20 August 2024 | Conservative | Former MP for Epsom and Ewell (2001 –2024), Lord Chancellor (2012–2015), Leader of the House of Commons, Lord President of the Council and Secretary of State for Transport |
| Lord Green of Deddington | 28 November 2014 | Crossbench | Former British ambassador |
| Lord Green of Hurstpierpoint | 16 November 2010 | Crossbench | Former group chairman of HSBC |
| Baroness Greenfield | 18 June 2001 | Crossbench | Professor of Synaptic Pharmacology at Oxford University and former director of the Royal Institution |
| Lord Greenhalgh | 16 April 2020 | Conservative | Minister of State for Building Safety and Fire Former Deputy Mayor of London for Policing and Crime, medical company executive and political candidate |
| Baroness Grender | 4 September 2013 | Liberal Democrat | Former head of communications for the Liberal Democrats |
| Baroness Grey-Thompson | 23 March 2010 | Crossbench | Former paralympic athlete |
| Baroness Griffin of Princethorpe | 16 January 2025 | Labour | Former MEP for North West England (2014–2020) |
| Lord Griffiths of Burry Port | 30 June 2004 | Labour | Former president of the Methodist Conference |
| Lord Griffiths of Fforestfach | 5 February 1991 | Conservative | Vice-president of the Nature in Art trust and vice-chairman of Goldman Sachs International |
| Lord Grimstone of Boscobel | 8 April 2020 | Conservative | Minister of State for Investment and former bank executive and civil servant |
| Lord Grocott | 2 July 2001 | Labour | Former presenter and producer at Central Television and former MP |
| Baroness Gustafsson | 15 November 2024 | Labour | Businesswoman, Minister of State for Investment |
| Viscount Hailsham | 12 October 2015 | Conservative | Hereditary peer who sits by virtue of a life peerage, Baron Hailsham of Kettlethorpe; Former MP for Sleaford and North Hykeham (1979–2010). |
| Lord Hain | 22 October 2015 | Labour Co-op | Former MP for Neath (1991–2015) |
| Baroness Hale of Richmond^{♎︎︎} | 12 January 2004 | Crossbench | Former president of the Supreme Court (2017–2020), Deputy President of the Supreme Court (2013–2017), Justice of the Supreme Court (2009–2020) and Lord of Appeal in Ordinary (2004–2009) |
| Lord Hall of Birkenhead | 19 March 2010 | Crossbench | Chief executive of the Royal Opera House, former director of news at the BBC, chairman of Creative & Cultural Skills and former chair of the Royal Television Society |
| Baroness Hallett | 11 October 2019 | Crossbench | Former Lady Justice of Appeal |
| Lord Hameed | 27 March 2007 | Crossbench | Chairman of Alpha Hospital Group, chairman and chief executive officer of the London International Hospital, former executive director and chief executive officer of the Cromwell Hospital, president of The Little Foundation and chairman of The Woolf Institute of Abrahamic Faiths |
| Lord Hamilton of Epsom | 17 June 2005 | Conservative | Former MP for Epsom and Ewell (1978–2001) and former chairman of the 1922 Committee |
| Lord Hammond of Runnymede | 30 September 2020 | Conservative | Former MP, Chancellor of the Exchequer and Secretary of State for Foreign and Commonwealth Affairs |
| Lord Hampton ‡ | 9 June 2026 (Note: Lord Hampton was previously a member of the House by virtue of his hereditary peerage from 25 October 2022 to 29 April 2026.) | Crossbench | Hereditary peer who sits by virtue of a life peerage, Baron Hampton of Newington Green; Photographer; former excepted hereditary peer (2022–2026) |
| Baroness Hamwee | 6 June 1991 | Liberal Democrat | Vice president of Parity and former chair of the London Assembly |
| Lord Hannan of Kingsclere | 25 January 2021 | Non-affiliated | Former MEP for South East England (1999–2020) |
| Lord Hannay of Chiswick | 19 June 2001 | Crossbench | Former senior diplomat |
| Lord Hannett of Everton | 12 March 2024 | Labour | Trade unionist, General Secretary of the Union of Shop, Distributive and Allied Workers (2004–2018) |
| Lord Hanson of Flint | 19 July 2024 | Labour | Minister of State in the Home Office, former MP for Delyn (1992–2019) |
| Baroness Harding of Winscombe | 15 September 2014 | Conservative | Chief executive of TalkTalk Group |
| Lord Harlech ‡ | 16 June 2026 (Note: Lord Harlech was previously a member of the House by virtue of his hereditary peerage from 21 July 2021 to 29 April 2026.) | Conservative | Hereditary peer who sits by virtue of a life peerage, Baron Harlech of Glyn Cywarch; Landowner, business manager and consultant, army reservist with the London Guards; former excepted hereditary peer (2021–2026) |
| Baroness Harman | 19 August 2024 | Labour | Former Leader of the Opposition (2010, 2015), former MP for Peckham (1982–1997) and for Camberwell and Peckham (1997–2024) |
| Lord Harper | 12 May 2025 | Conservative | Former MP for Forest of Dean (2005–2024), former Secretary of State for Transport (2022–2024) |
| Lord Harrington of Watford | 15 March 2022 | Non-affiliated | Former MP for Watford (2010–2019), Minister of State for Refugees |
| Lord Harris of Haringey | 5 August 1998 | Labour | Former chair of the Association of London Government, former leader of Haringey Borough Council, former chair of the Metropolitan Police Authority, member of the London Assembly and chair of Freedom |
| Baroness Harris of Richmond | 6 August 1999 | Liberal Democrat | Chair of the Industry and Parliament Trust, president of the National Association of Chaplains to the Police and former chair of North Yorkshire County Council and Police Authority |
| Lord Hart of Tenby | 28 May 2025 | Conservative | Former MP for Carmarthen West and South Pembrokeshire (2010–2024), Secretary of State for Wales (2019–2022), Chief Whip of the House of Commons (2022–2024) |
| Lord Hastings of Scarisbrick | 12 October 2005 | Crossbench | Vice-president of Catch22, ambassador of Make Justice Work |
| Lord Haughey | 18 September 2013 | Labour | Businessman and philanthropist |
| Lord Hay of Ballyore | 16 December 2014 | Democratic Unionist | Former Speaker of the Northern Ireland Assembly |
| Baroness Hayman | 2 January 1996 | Crossbench | Former MP for Welwyn and Hatfield (1974–1979), Lord Speaker (2006–11), chair of Cancer Research UK, chair of the Human Tissue Authority and chair of Whittington Hospital NHS Trust |
| Baroness Hayman of Ullock | 9 September 2020 | Labour | Former MP for Workington (2015–2019) |
| Baroness Hayter of Kentish Town | 22 June 2010 | Labour Co-op | General secretary of the Fabian Society (1976–1982), chief executive of the European Parliamentary Labour Party (1990–1996) and Chair of the Labour Party (2007–2008) |
| Lord Hayward | 28 September 2015 | Conservative | Psephologist, Former MP for Kingswood (1983–1992) and former business and charity executive |
| Baroness Hazarika | 14 March 2024 | Labour | Journalist and political adviser |
| Baroness Healy of Primrose Hill | 19 July 2010 | Labour | Former political aide |
| Baroness Helic | 18 September 2014 | Conservative | Government special adviser on preventing sexual violence in conflict zones |
| Lord Hendy | 15 October 2019 | Labour | Barrister |
| Lord Hendy of Richmond Hill | 17 November 2022 | Labour | Chairman of Network Rail and former Commissioner of Transport for London |
| Lord Herbert of South Downs | 1 September 2020 | Conservative | Former MP for Arundel and South Downs (2005–2019) |
| Lord Hermer | 18 July 2024 | Labour | Attorney General for England and Wales (since 2024), Advocate General for Northern Ireland (since 2024) |
| Lord Heseltine | 12 July 2001 | Conservative | Former MP for Tavistock (1966–1974) for Henley (1974–2001), Deputy Prime Minister, Secretary of State for Defence, Environment and President of the Board of Trade |
| Lord Hill of Oareford | 27 May 2010 | Conservative | Former European Commissioner for Financial Stability Financial Services and Capital Markets Union, former Leader of the House of Lords, Chancellor of the Duchy of Lancaster, and Parliamentary Under-Secretary of State for Schools |
| Lord Hintze | 3 November 2022 | Conservative | Businessman and philanthropist, founder of asset management firm CQS |
| Lord Hobby | 30 January 2026 | Non-affiliated | Trade union leader, CEO of The Kemnal Academies Trust, former CEO of Teach First from (2017–2025) |
| Baroness Hodge of Barking | 14 August 2024 | Labour | Former MP for Barking (1994–2024), former leader of Islington London Borough Council (1982–1992), former chair of the Fabian Society (1998–1999) |
| Baroness Hodgson of Abinger | 16 September 2013 | Conservative | Conservative politician |
| Baroness Hoey | 14 September 2020 | Non-affiliated | Former MP for Vauxhall (1989–2019) |
| Lord Hoffmann^{♎︎︎} | 21 February 1995 | Crossbench | Former Law Lord and Professor of Law at Queen Mary College, University of London |
| Lord Hogan-Howe | 7 November 2017 | Crossbench | Former Commissioner of Police of the Metropolis |
| Baroness Hogg | 3 February 1995 | Crossbench | As the wife of Viscount Hailsham, she is also entitled to the style "Viscountess Hailsham" |
| Lord Hollick | 20 June 1991 | Labour | Business executive and former banker, businessman and print-media executive |
| Baroness Hollins | 15 November 2010 | Crossbench | Professor of the psychiatry of learning disability at St George's, University of London, former president of the Royal Society of Psychiatrists |
| Lord Holmes of Richmond | 13 September 2013 | Conservative | Former swimmer, Paralympian, journalist and solicitor |
| Baroness Hooper | 10 June 1985 | Conservative | President of Waste Watch, president of the European Foundation For Heritage Skills, and president of Good Guy's Cancer Appeal |
| Lord Hope of Craighead | 28 February 1995 | Crossbench | Former Lord of Appeal in Ordinary and former Deputy President of the Supreme Court of the United Kingdom |
| Lord Houchen of High Leven | 12 July 2023 | Conservative | Tees Valley Mayor (since 2017), former councillor on Stockton-on-Tees Borough Council (2011–2017) |
| Lord Houghton of Richmond | 20 November 2017 | Crossbench | Former Chief of the Defence Staff |
| Lord Howard of Lympne | 13 July 2010 | Conservative | Former MP for Folkestone and Hythe (1983–2010), Home Secretary, Leader of the Conservative Party and Leader of the Opposition |
| Lord Howard of Rising | 4 June 2004 | Conservative | Director of Fortress Holdings |
| Earl of Howe ‡ | 9 June 2026 (Note: Earl Howe was previously a member of the House by virtue of his hereditary peerage from 30 October 1984 to 29 April 2026.) | Conservative | Hereditary peer who sits by virtue of a life peerage, Baron Curzon of Amersham; Deputy Leader of the House and Minister of State for Defence; former excepted hereditary peer (1999–2026) |
| Lord Howell of Guildford | 6 June 1997 | Conservative | Former MP for Guildford (1966–1997), Secretaries of State for Energy and Transport |
| Baroness Hughes of Stretford | 15 July 2010 | Labour | Former head of the Department of Social Policy at the University of Manchester and former Minister of State for Children, Young People and Families and former MP for Stretford and Urmston (1997–2010) |
| Baroness Humphreys | 18 September 2013 | Liberal Democrat | Former AM for North Wales and President of the Welsh Liberal Democrats |
| Baroness Hunt of Bethnal Green | 16 October 2019 | Crossbench | Former Chief Executive of Stonewall |
| Lord Hunt of Kings Heath | 20 October 1997 | Labour Co-op | President of the Royal Society for Public Health and former chief executive of the NHS Confederation, and former director of its two predecessor organisations |
| Lord Hunt of Wirral | 20 October 1997 | Conservative | Former MP for Wirral (1976–1983) for Wirral West (1983–1997); Partner at the law firm Beachcroft LLP |
| Baroness Hunter of Auchenreoch | 5 February 2025 | Labour | Public relations advisor |
| Lord Hussain | 20 January 2011 | Liberal Democrat | Deputy Group Leader of the Liberal Democrat group on Luton Borough Council |
| Baroness Hussein-Ece | 25 June 2010 | Liberal Democrat | Former non-executive director of Camden and Islington Mental Health and Social Care Trust, and former equality and human rights commissioner |
| Baroness Hyde of Bemerton | 12 January 2026 | Labour | Member of Islington London Borough Council for Caledonian (since 2018), chair of the Fabian Society |
| Lord Isaac | 19 January 2026 | Labour | Solicitor, provost of Worcester College, Oxford (since 2021), chair of the Henry Moore Foundation (since 2024) |
| Lord Jabbar | 18 August 2026 | Labour | Co-Executive Director of The Death Penalty Project (since 1992) |
| Lord Jack of Courance | 9 May 2025 | Conservative | Former MP for Dumfries and Galloway (2017–2024), former Secretary of State for Scotland (2019–2024) |
| Lord Jackson of Peterborough | 16 November 2022 | Conservative | Former MP for Peterborough (2005–2017), former councilor on the Ealing Borough Council (1990–1998) |
| Lord James of Blackheath | 9 June 2006 | Conservative | Corporate trouble-shooter and former agent for MI5 |
| Lord Jamieson | 11 March 2024 | Conservative | Former leader of the Central Bedfordshire Council and former chair of the Local Government Association |
| Baroness Janke | 24 September 2014 | Liberal Democrat | Former leader of Bristol City Council |
| Lord Janvrin | 10 October 2007 | Crossbench | Permanent Lord-in-waiting; former Private Secretary to Queen Elizabeth II |
| Lord Jay of Ewelme | 18 September 2006 | Crossbench | Former permanent secretary to the Foreign and Commonwealth Office and head of the Diplomatic Service |
| Baroness Jay of Paddington | 29 July 1992 | Labour | Chairman of the House of Lords Constitution Committee |
| Baroness Jenkin of Kennington | 26 January 2011 | Conservative | PR consultant, and active in promoting women in Parliament |
| Lord John of Southwark | 7 January 2026 | Labour | Former leader of Southwark London Borough Council (2010–2020) |
| Lord Johnson of Lainston | 19 October 2022 | Conservative | Minister of State for Investment, hedge fund manager, financier and former councilor for the Royal Borough of Kensington and Chelsea (2006–2010) |
| Lord Johnson of Marylebone | 12 October 2020 | Conservative | Former MP for Orpington (2010–2019) |
| Lord Jones | 6 July 2001 | Labour | Former MP for East Flintshire 1970–1983 and for Alyn & Deeside 1983–2001 |
| Baroness Jones of Moulsecoomb | 20 September 2013 | Green | Green Party politician and former 2nd Statutory Deputy Mayor of London and Member of the London Assembly |
| Lord Jones of Penybont | 23 January 2025 | Labour | Former MS for Bridgend (1999–2021), First Minister of Wales (2009–2018) |
| Baroness Jones of Whitchurch | 5 June 2006 | Labour | Director of Policy and Public Affairs at UNISON and former chair of the Labour Party |
| Lord Jordan | 5 June 2000 | Labour | Former president of the Amalgamated Engineering and Electrical Union, former general secretary of the International Confederation of Free Trade Unions, former governor of both the BBC and the London School of Economics |
| Lord Kakkar | 22 March 2010 | Crossbench | Professor of Surgical Sciences at St Bartholomew's Hospital and the London School of Medicine and Dentistry, Queen Mary University |
| Lord Kamall | 28 January 2021 | Conservative | Professor of Politics and International Relations at St Mary's University and former MEP for London (2005–2019) |
| Lord Katz | 28 January 2025 | Labour | National Movement Chair for the Jewish Labour Movement (since 2019), former Camden London Borough Council member (2010–2014) |
| Baroness Keeley | 13 August 2024 | Labour | Former MP for Worsley and Eccles South (2010–2024) and Worsley (2005–2010), former Member of Trafford Council for Priory (1995–2004) |
| Lord Keen of Elie | 8 June 2015 | Conservative | Lawyer, Conservative Party politician and former Advocate General for Scotland and Chairman of the Scottish Conservative Party |
| Lord Kempsell | 11 July 2023 | Conservative | Political journalist, former political director of the Conservative Party and former director of the Conservative Research Department |
| Baroness Kennedy of Cradley | 19 September 2013 | Labour | Political aide, politician and former deputy general secretary of the Labour Party |
| Lord Kennedy of Southwark | 21 June 2010 | Labour Co-op | Labour Party official, politician and Opposition Chief Whip in the House of Lords |
| Baroness Kennedy of The Shaws | 27 October 1997 | Labour | Criminal and human rights lawyer, chair of JUSTICE |
| Lord Kerr of Kinlochard | 30 June 2004 | Crossbench | Former Permanent Secretary to the Foreign and Commonwealth Office and head of the Diplomatic Service |
| Lord Kestenbaum | 24 January 2011 | Labour | Chief executive of National Endowment for Science, Technology and the Arts |
| Lord Khan of Burnley | 4 February 2021 | Labour | Former MEP for North West England (2017–2019) |
| Lord Khan of Tooting | 20 August 2026 | Labour | Mayor of London (since 2016); MP for Tooting (2005–2016) |
| Baroness Kidron | 25 June 2012 | Crossbench | Film director |
| Lord Kilclooney | 17 July 2001 | Crossbench | Former MP for Strangford (1998–2007), former MEP for Northern Ireland (1979–1989) |
| Lord King of Bridgwater | 9 July 2001 | Conservative | Former MP for Bridgwater (1970–2001), Environment Secretary, Transport Secretary, Employment Secretary, Northern Ireland Secretary and chairman of the Intelligence and Security Committee |
| Lord King of Lothbury | 19 July 2013 | Crossbench | Former governor of the Bank of England |
| Baroness Kingsmill | 1 June 2006 | Labour | Former deputy chair of the Monopolies and Mergers Commission and of the Competition Commission |
| Lord Kinnock | 28 January 2005 | Labour | Former MP for Bedwellty (1970–1983) for Islwyn (1983–1995), Leader of the Labour Party 1983–92, European Commissioner for Transport and Administrative Reform and Vice-President of the European Commission |
| Lord Kinnoull | 6 February 2015 | Crossbench | Hereditary peer who sits by virtue of a life peerage, Baron Kinnoull of the Ochils; President of the Royal Caledonian Ball Trust and commanding officer of the Atholl Highlanders; former excepted hereditary peer (2015–2026) |
| Lord Kirkham | 23 July 1999 | Conservative | Executive Chairman of DFS Furniture Company Ltd |
| Lord Kirkhope of Harrogate | 7 October 2016 | Conservative | Former MEP for Yorkshire and the Humber (1999–2016) and MP for Leeds North East (1987–1997) |
| Baroness Kitching of Penistone | 2 September 2026 | Liberal Democrat | Chair of the Yorkshire Liberal Democrats |
| Lord Knight of Weymouth | 23 June 2010 | Labour Co-op | Former MP for South Dorset (2001–2010) |
| Baroness Kramer | 22 December 2010 | Liberal Democrat | Former vice-president of Citibank, director and co-founder of International Capital Partners, former MP for Richmond Park (2005–2010) and Minister of State for Transport (2013–2015) |
| Lord Krebs | 28 March 2007 | Crossbench | Professor of Zoology at the University of Oxford, former chair of the Food Standards Agency, member of the committee on climate change and chair of adaptation sub-committee, chair of the Royal Society Science Policy Advisory Group |
| Baroness Laing of Elderslie | 22 August 2024 | Conservative | Former MP for Epping Forest (1997–May 2024) |
| Lord Lamont of Lerwick | 24 July 1998 | Conservative | Former MP for Kingston-upon-Thames (1972–1997) and Chancellor of the Exchequer |
| Baroness Lampard | 17 November 2022 | Non-affiliated | Former barrister |
| Lord Lancaster of Kimbolton | 16 September 2020 | Non-affiliated | Former MP for Milton Keynes North (2010–2019) and for North East Milton Keynes (2005–2010) |
| Baroness Lane-Fox of Soho | 25 March 2013 | Crossbench | Chancellor of the Open University, businesswoman and philanthrope |
| Lord Lansley | 5 October 2015 | Conservative | Former MP for South Cambridgeshire (1997–2015) and Leader of the House of Commons |
| Baroness Lawlor | 3 November 2022 | Conservative | Founder of the think tank Politeia |
| Baroness Lawrence of Clarendon | 6 September 2013 | Labour | Former chancellor of De Montfort University, campaigner for police reform and mother of Stephen Lawerence |
| Lord Layard | 3 May 2000 | Labour | Emeritus Professor of Economics at the London School of Economics |
| Baroness Leaman | 29 January 2026 | Liberal Democrat | Former Chief of Staff to Jo Swinson and Ed Davey |
| Lord Lebedev | 19 November 2020 | Crossbench | Businessman, owner of Lebedev Holdings Ltd (Evening Standard, The Independent, London Live) and son of Alexander Lebedev |
| Lord Lee of Trafford | 26 May 2006 | Liberal Democrat | Former MP for Nelson and Colne (1979–1983) for Pendle (1983–1992) |
| Lord Lehrfreund | 14 September 2026 | Labour | Co-Executive Director of The Death Penalty Project (since 1992) |
| Lord Leigh of Hurley | 16 September 2013 | Conservative | Former accountant, banker and Treasurer of the Conservative Party |
| Lord Lemos | 22 January 2025 | Labour | Social policy researcher |
| Lord Lennie | 22 September 2014 | Labour | Former deputy secretary general of the Labour Party |
| Lord Leong | 31 October 2022 | Labour | Former barrister, founder of Cavendish Publishing |
| Lord Leunig | 27 August 2026 | Liberal Democrat | Chief Economist at Nesta and Visiting Professor at London School of Economics |
| Lord Leveson of Liverpool | 25 August 2026 | Crossbench | Investigatory Powers Commissioner (since 2019) |
| Baroness Levitt | 22 January 2025 | Labour | Judge and lawyer |
| Lord Levy | 23 September 1997 | Labour | Former special envoy to the Middle East, President of JFS, President of Sense & Sense International, President of Jewish Care |
| Lord Lexden | 23 December 2010 | Conservative | Former consultant and editor in chief of the Conservative Research Department and former lecturer in modern history |
| Baroness Liddell of Coatdyke | 7 July 2010 | Labour | Former MP for Monklands East (1994–1997) and for Airdrie and Shotts (1997–2005), British High Commissioner to Australia and Secretary of State for Scotland |
| Lord Liddle | 19 June 2010 | Labour | Chairman of the International Think Tank Policy Network and former chairman of the Public Policy Centre and former managing director of Prima Europe Ltd, a consultancy company |
| Lord Lilley | 18 June 2018 | Conservative | Former MP, Secretary of State for Social Security, for Trade and Industry, Shadow Chancellor of the Exchequer and Deputy Leader of the Conservative Party |
| Baroness Limb | 5 February 2026 | Labour | Former Chair of The Scout Association |
| Baroness Linforth | 14 January 2026 | Labour | Former Labour Party Chief of Staff – Operations |
| Lord Lingfield | 17 December 2010 | Conservative | Chairman of the League of Mercy Foundation, former director-general of St. John Ambulance and advocate of free schools |
| Baroness Lister of Burtersett | 31 January 2011 | Labour | Emeritus Professor of Social Policy at Loughborough University |
| Lord Lisvane | 11 December 2014 | Crossbench | Former Clerk of the House of Commons |
| Lord Livermore | 21 October 2015 | Labour | Strategy and communications consultant |
| Lord Livingston of Parkhead | 12 July 2013 | Crossbench | Former Minister for Trade and Investment |
| Baroness Lloyd of Effra | 13 October 2025 | Labour | Political adviser, Deputy Downing Street Chief of Staff (2005–2007) |
| Lord Londesborough ‡ | 16 June 2026 (Note: Lord Londesborough was previously a member of the House by virtue of his hereditary peerage from 8 April 1996 to 11 November 1999, and again from 23 June 2021 to 29 April 2026.) | Crossbench | Hereditary peer who sits by virtue of a life peerage, Baron Londesborough of Richmond Hill; Businessman, chairman and director of Tussell Limited; former excepted hereditary peer (2021–2026) |
| Lord Loomba | 12 January 2011 | Crossbench | Executive chairman of the Rinku Group and pioneer of widow's rights |
| Baroness Lowe of Armley | 18 August 2026 | Labour | Deputy Mayor for Policing and Crime in West Yorkshire (since 2021) |
| Baroness Ludford | 30 September 1997 | Liberal Democrat | MEP for London (1999–2014) |
| Lord Lupton | 6 October 2015 | Non-affiliated | Bank executive and former Co-Treasurer of the Conservative Party |
| Lord Macdonald of River Glaven | 12 July 2010 | Crossbench | Former Director of Public Prosecutions |
| Lord Macintosh of Eastwood | 19 August 2026 | Labour | Presiding Officer of the Scottish Parliament (2016–2021) |
| Lord Mackenzie of Framwellgate | 17 July 1998 | Non-affiliated | Former chief superintendent in the Durham Constabulary, former president of the Police Superintendents' Association |
| Baroness Mackenzie of Sherwood | 24 August 2026 | Labour | Artistic director |
| Lord Mackinlay of Richborough | 23 August 2024 | Conservative | Former MP for South Thanet (2015–2024), former acting leader of the UK Independence Party (1997) |
| Baroness Maclean of Redditch | 5 February 2025 | Conservative | Former MP for Redditch (2017–2024), former Minister of State for Housing and Planning (2023), former Minister of State for Victims and Vulnerability (2022) |
| Baroness MacLeod of Camusdarach | 16 January 2026 | Labour | Journalist |
| Lord Macpherson of Earl's Court | 4 October 2016 | Crossbench | Former Permanent Secretary to the Treasury |
| Lord Magan of Castletown | 25 January 2011 | Conservative | Chartered accountant |
| Lord Mair | 29 October 2015 | Crossbench | Professor of Geotechnical Engineering at the University of Cambridge |
| Baroness Mallalieu | 19 June 1991 | Labour | President of the Countryside Alliance |
| Lord Mance^{♎︎︎} | 3 October 2005 | Crossbench | Former Deputy President (2017–2018) and Justice of the Supreme Court of the United Kingdom (2009–2018) and Lord of Appeal in Ordinary (2005–2009) |
| Lord Mann | 28 October 2019 | Labour | Former MP for Bassetlaw (2001–2019) |
| Baroness Manningham-Buller | 2 June 2008 | Crossbench | Former director of the Security Service |
| Baroness Manzoor | 6 September 2013 | Conservative | Businesswoman, civil servant and nurse |
| Lord Markham | 7 October 2022 | Conservative | Businessman, chairman of London & Continental Railways |
| Lord Marks of Hale | 8 March 2024 | Conservative | Businessman |
| Lord Marks of Henley-on-Thames | 11 January 2011 | Liberal Democrat | Commercial and family law KC with specialist interest in human rights and constitutional reform |
| Lord Marland | 8 June 2006 | Conservative | Chairman of Herriot Ltd and of Hunter Boot Ltd |
| Baroness Martin of Brockley | 20 January 2026 | Labour | Former chief of staff to Chancellor of the Exchequer Rachel Reeves, former director of public affairs for Citizens Advice. |
| Lord Massey of Hampstead | 12 May 2025 | Conservative | Financier, former chief executive of the Conservative Party (2022–2024) |
| Baroness Mattinson | 3 February 2025 | Labour | Author, political advisor |
| Lord Maude of Horsham | 26 May 2015 | Conservative | Former MP for North Warwickshire (1983–1992) and for Horsham (1997–2015) |
| Lord Mawson | 29 March 2007 | Crossbench | Founder board member of Poplar HARCA (housing association) and author of The Social Entrepreneur: Making Communities Work |
| Baroness May of Maidenhead | 21 August 2024 | Conservative | Former prime minister (2016–2019), former Home Secretary (2010–2016), former MP for Maidenhead (1997–2024) |
| Baroness McAnea | 17 August 2026 | Labour | Former General Secretary of Unison |
| Lord McCabe | 7 February 2025 | Labour | Former MP for Birmingham Selly Oak (2010–2024) and Birmingham Hall Green (1997–2010), former Lord Commissioner of the Treasury (2007–2010) |
| Lord McCobb | 3 September 2026 | Liberal Democrat | Liberal Democrat Director of Field Campaigns (since 2020) |
| Lord McColl of Dulwich | 25 July 1989 | Conservative | Professor Emeritus of Surgery at Guy's Hospital, associated with King's College London |
| Lord McConnell of Glenscorrodale | 28 June 2010 | Labour | Former First Minister of Scotland |
| Lord McCrea of Magherafelt and Cookstown | 19 June 2018 | Democratic Unionist | Former MP for South Antrim (2000–2001, 2005–2015) and for Mid Ulster (1983–1997) |
| Lord McDonald of Salford | 27 January 2021 | Crossbench | Former Permanent Under-Secretary of State for Foreign Affairs and British ambassador to Germany and to Israel |
| Lord McFall of Alcluith | 17 June 2010 | Crossbench | Former Lord Speaker, former Senior Deputy Speaker, former chairman of the House of Commons Treasury Committee and former MP |
| Baroness McGregor-Smith | 16 October 2015 | Non-affiliated | Businesswoman and former CEO of Mitie Group PLC |
| Lord McInnes of Kilwinning | 1 September 2016 | Conservative | Former Councillor on the Edinburgh City Council |
| Baroness McIntosh of Hudnall | 3 August 1999 | Labour | Former associate producer at the Royal Shakespeare Company, former executive director of the Royal National Theatre |
| Baroness McIntosh of Pickering | 6 October 2015 | Conservative | Former MP for Vale of York (1997–2010) and for Thirsk and Malton (2010–2015) |
| Lord McLoughlin | 8 September 2020 | Conservative | Former MP for West Derbyshire (1986–2010) and for Derbyshire Dales (2010–2019), Secretary of State for Transport and Chancellor of the Duchy of Lancaster |
| Lord McNally | 20 December 1995 | Liberal Democrat | Former MP for Stockport South (1979–1983), Minister of State for Justice and leader of the Liberal Democrats in the House of Lords |
| Lord McNicol of West Kilbride | 21 June 2018 | Labour | General Secretary of the Labour Party (2011–2018) |
| Lord McTague | 26 August 2026 | Labour | National Chair of the Federation of Small Businesses (since 2022) |
| Lord Mendelsohn | 5 September 2013 | Labour | Lobbyist |
| Lord Mendoza | 16 September 2020 | Conservative | Provost of Oriel College, Oxford, businessman, publisher, philanthropist. |
| Baroness Merron | 28 January 2021 | Labour | Former MP for Lincoln (1997–2010) |
| Baroness Meyer | 19 June 2018 | Conservative | Businesswoman and activist for women and children |
| Baroness Miller of Chilthorne Domer | 6 October 1998 | Liberal Democrat | Former Leader South Somerset District Council, Somerset County Councillor, environmental campaigner |
| Baroness Mills of Greenwich | 28 August 2026 | Labour | Chair of the Bar Council of England and Wales (2025) |
| Earl of Minto ‡ | 17 June 2026 (Note: The Earl of Minto was previously a member of the House by virtue of his hereditary peerage from 25 October 2022 to 29 April 2026.) | Conservative | Hereditary peer who sits by virtue of a life peerage, Baron Minto of Burncrooks; Chief executive of Paperchase; former excepted hereditary peer (2022–2026) |
| Lord Mitchell | 10 May 2000 | Labour | Businessman |
| Baroness Mobarik | 19 September 2014 | Conservative | Former MEP for Scotland (2017–2020) |
| Lord Mohammed of Tinsley | 21 February 2025 | Liberal Democrat | Former MEP for Yorkshire and the Humber (2019–2020), current Sheffield City Council member (2004–2014, 2016–present) |
| Baroness Monckton of Dallington Forest | 12 March 2024 | Conservative | Businesswoman and charity campaigner |
| Lord Monks | 26 July 2010 | Labour Co-op | Trade unionist, General Secretary of the Trades Union Congress (1993–2003) and the European Trade Union Confederation |
| Lord Moore of Etchingham | 17 September 2020 | Non-affiliated | Former editor of The Daily Telegraph, The Spectator and The Sunday Telegraph |
| Lord Moraes | 15 January 2025 | Labour | Former MEP for London (1999–2020) |
| Lord Morgan | 12 June 2000 | Labour | Professor of History at Brunel University |
| Baroness Morgan of Cotes | 6 January 2020 | Non-affiliated | Former MP for Loughborough (2010–2019), Secretary of State for Digital, Culture, Media and Sport |
| Baroness Morgan of Drefelin | 11 June 2004 | Labour | Former director or chief executive of various voluntary sector organisations such as Shelter, Breakthrough Breast Cancer, Workplace Nursery Campaign and Childcare Umbrella |
| Baroness Morgan of Ely | 24 January 2011 | Labour | Leader of Welsh Labour and First Minister of Wales (2024–2026), MS for Mid and West Wales (2016–2026), Minister for Health and Social Services in the Welsh Government (2021–2024), Honorary Distinguished Professor at Cardiff University and former MEP for Mid and West Wales (1994–1999) and Wales (1999–2009) |
| Baroness Morgan of Huyton | 20 June 2001 | Labour | Master of Fitzwilliam College, Cambridge |
| Baroness Morris of Bolton | 9 June 2004 | Conservative | President of the National Benevolent Institution |
| Baroness Morris of Yardley | 14 June 2005 | Labour | Former MP for Birmingham Yardley (1992–2005), former Secretary State for Education |
| Baroness Morrissey | 3 September 2020 | Conservative | Financier, former chief executive at Newton Investment Management |
| Lord Morrow | 7 June 2006 | Democratic Unionist | Chairman of the Democratic Unionist Party, former MLA for Fermanagh & South Tyrone (1998–2017), former Minister for Social Development (2000–2001) and Minister for Communities (2016) |
| Lord Morse | 26 March 2021 | Crossbench | Former Comptroller and Auditor General |
| Lord Mott | 19 June 2023 | Conservative | Former chief executive of the Conservative Party |
| Lord Moylan | 9 September 2020 | Conservative | Banker, merchant, former member of Kensington and Chelsea London Borough Council |
| Lord Moynihan ‡ | 4 June 2026 (Note: Lord Moynihan was previously a member of the House by virtue of his hereditary peerage from 30 April 1997 to 29 April 2026.) | Conservative | Hereditary peer who sits by virtue of a life peerage, Baron Moynihan of Purbeck; Former MP for Lewisham East (1983–1992), former Minister for Sport (1987–1990), former chairman of the British Olympic Association (2005–2012), Olympic rower; former excepted hereditary peer (1999–2026) |
| Lord Moynihan of Chelsea | 6 February 2024 | Conservative | Businessman, former CEO and executive chairman of PA Consulting Group (1992–2013) |
| Baroness Moyo | 8 November 2022 | Non-affiliated | Zambian-born economist and author |
| Baroness Murphy | 17 June 2004 | Crossbench | Former professor of psychiatry of old age at Guy's and St Thomas' Hospitals United Medical School |
| Lord Murphy of Torfaen | 20 October 2015 | Labour | Former MP for Torfaen (1987–2015) |
| Lord Murray of Blidworth | 21 October 2022 | Conservative | Barrister, Minister of State for Home Affairs, councilor on the Gedling Borough Council |
| Lord Nagaraju | 29 January 2026 | Labour | Technology consultant |
| Baroness Nargund | 21 January 2026 | Labour | Physician |
| Lord Naseby | 28 October 1997 | Conservative | Former MP for Northampton South (1974–1997), former chairman of Ways and Means (1992–1997) |
| Lord Nash | 21 January 2013 | Conservative | Businessman |
| Baroness Neate | 26 November 2025 | Crossbench | CEO of Shelter and Women's Aid, and executive director of Action for Children |
| Lord Neri | 21 August 2026 | Labour | CEO of The Ivors Academy (since 2024); Director of UK Music |
| Baroness Neuberger | 15 June 2004 | Crossbench | Philanthropist, author, social reformer, rabbi, former chair of Camden and Islington Community Health Services NHS Trust, former chairman of the King's Fund |
| Lord Neuberger of Abbotsbury^{♎︎︎} | 11 January 2007 | Crossbench | Former president of the Supreme Court (2012–2017), Master of the Rolls (2009–2012) and Lord of Appeal in Ordinary (2007–2009) |
| Baroness Neville-Jones | 15 October 2007 | Conservative | Former Minister of State for Security, former diplomat and former chairman of the Joint Intelligence Committee |
| Baroness Neville-Rolfe | 10 September 2013 | Conservative | Businesswoman, former civil servant and former Commercial Secretary to the Treasury |
| Lord Newby | 25 September 1997 | Liberal Democrat | Chair of Sport at The Prince's Trust |
| Baroness Nichols of Selby | 31 January 2025 | Labour | Trade unionist |
| Baroness Nicholson of Winterbourne | 3 November 1997 | Conservative | Executive Chairman of the AMAR International Charitable Foundation and of the Iraq Britain Business Council, former MP for Torridge and West Devon (1987–1997) |
| Baroness Noakes | 7 June 2000 | Conservative | Chartered accountant, former president of the Institute of Chartered Accountants in England and Wales |
| Baroness Northover | 1 May 2000 | Liberal Democrat | Academic, lecturer at University College London |
| Lord Norton of Louth | 1 August 1998 | Conservative | Professor of Government at the University of Hull |
| Baroness Nye | 19 July 2010 | Labour | Former director of government relations, former diary secretary to the then–prime minister Gordon Brown |
| Lord Oates | 5 October 2015 | Liberal Democrat | Former communications adviser to David Cameron and Nick Clegg |
| Lord O'Donnell | 10 January 2012 | Crossbench | Former Permanent Secretary to the Treasury, Cabinet Secretary and Head of the Home Civil Service |
| Baroness O'Grady of Upper Holloway | 9 December 2022 | Labour | Trade unionist, General Secretary of the Trades Union Congress (2013–2022) |
| Baroness O'Loan | 11 September 2009 | Crossbench | Former chair of the Equality and Human Rights Commission's Human Rights Enquiry |
| Baroness O'Neill of Bengarve | 25 February 1999 | Crossbench | Professor of Philosophy at the University of Cambridge, founding president of the British Philosophical Association, former chair of the Nuffield Foundation and the Nuffield Council on Bioethics and former president of the British Academy |
| Baroness O'Neill of Bexley | 7 November 2022 | Conservative | Leader of the Bexley London Borough Council |
| Lord O'Neill of Gatley | 28 May 2015 | Crossbench | Economist, honorary professor at the University of Manchester, and former Commercial Secretary to the Treasury |
| Baroness Osamor | 26 November 2018 | Labour | Community activist and civil rights campaigner, a former councilor in the London Borough of Haringey |
| Lord O'Shaughnessy | 1 October 2015 | Conservative | Director of Policy to Prime Minister David Cameron |
| Baroness Owen of Alderley Edge | 12 July 2023 | Conservative | Former parliamentary assistant and special adviser. |
| Lord Pack | 29 January 2025 | Liberal Democrat | President of the Liberal Democrats (since 2020) |
| Lord Paddick | 12 September 2013 | Non-affiliated | Former police officer and current non-executive director of the Metropolitan Police |
| Lord Palmer of Childs Hill | 17 January 2011 | Liberal Democrat | Chartered accountant, former councillor on the Barnet London Borough Council, former treasurer for the Liberal Party |
| Lord Pannick | 3 November 2008 | Crossbench | Leading human rights barrister, arguing over a hundred cases before the UK's highest court and the European Court of Justice and of Human Rights |
| Lord Parekh | 10 May 2000 | Labour | Centennial Professor in the Centre for the Study of Global Governance at the London School of Economics, emeritus professor of political theory at the University of Hull, emeritus professor of political philosophy at the University of Westminster |
| Lord Parker of Minsmere | 29 January 2021 | Crossbench | Former Lord Chamberlain and Director General of MI5 |
| Lord Parkinson of Whitley Bay | 8 October 2019 | Conservative | Special adviser to Theresa May, lobbyist |
| Baroness Parminter | 15 July 2010 | Liberal Democrat | Former head of public affairs at the Royal Society for the Prevention of Cruelty to Animals and former chief executive of the Campaign to Protect Rural England |
| Lord Patel | 1 March 1999 | Crossbench | Former president of the Royal College of Obstetricians and Gynaecologists, former chairmen of the Academy of Medical Royal Colleges of Scotland and of the Academy of Medical Royal Colleges of the United Kingdom and former professor of obstetrics at the University of Dundee |
| Lord Patel of Bradford | 8 June 2006 | Non-affiliated | Professor at the University of Central Lancashire |
| Lord Patten | 17 June 1997 | Conservative | Former MP for Oxford (1979–1983) and for Oxford West and Abingdon (1983–1997) and Secretary of State for Education |
| Lord Patten of Barnes | 11 January 2005 | Conservative | Former MP for Bath (1979–1992), chairman of the BBC Trust, Secretary of State for the Environment, Governor and Commander-in-Chief of Hong Kong, European Commissioner for External Relations |
| Baroness Paul of Shepherd's Bush | 13 January 2026 | Labour | Civil servant |
| Lord Peach | 21 November 2022 | Crossbench | Air Chief Marshal, former chair of the NATO Military Committee, former Chief of the Defence Staff, former Chief of Joint Operations, former Chief of Defence Intelligence |
| Lord Pearson of Rannoch | 18 June 1990 | Non-affiliated | Former leader of UK Independence Party |
| Baroness Penn | 10 October 2019 | Conservative | Political advisor, Deputy Chief of Staff to Prime Minister Theresa May |
| Lord Petitgas | 7 March 2024 | Conservative | Investment banker, former president of Morgan Stanley International |
| Lord Petterson | 28 August 2026 | Liberal Democrat | Director of Warwick Energy Limited (since 2000) |
| Lord Phillips of Worth Matravers^{♎︎︎} | 12 January 1999 | Crossbench | President of the Supreme Court (2009–2012), Senior Law Lord (2008–2009), Lord Chief Justice of England and Wales (2005–2008), Master of the Rolls (2000–2005), Lord of Appeal in Ordinary (1999–2000) |
| Lord Pickles | 18 June 2018 | Conservative | Former MP for Brentwood and Ongar (1992–2017), Secretary of State for Communities and Local Government and Chairman of the Conservative Party |
| Baroness Pidding | 8 October 2015 | Conservative | Former Chiltern District Councillor |
| Baroness Pidgeon | 12 August 2024 | Liberal Democrat | Former Member of the London Assembly (2008–2024), former Member of Southwark London Borough Council for Newington (1998–2010) |
| Baroness Pinnock | 23 September 2014 | Liberal Democrat | Former leader of Kirklees Council |
| Baroness Pitkeathley | 6 October 1997 | Labour | Former chief executive of Carers UK and a founding member of the Association of Chief Executives of Voluntary Organisations |
| Lord Pitkeathley of Camden Town | 24 January 2025 | Labour | Businessman |
| Lord Pitt-Watson | 15 January 2026 | Labour | Businessman, former councillor on Westminster City Council for Maida Vale (1986–1990) |
| Lord Polak | 2 October 2015 | Conservative | Businessman and business consultant |
| Lord Ponsonby of Shulbrede ‡ | 19 April 2000 (Note: Lord Ponsonby of Shulbrede was previously a member of the House by virtue of his hereditary peerage from 1990 until the House of Lords Act in 1999.) | Non-affiliated | Hereditary peer who sits by virtue of a life peerage, Baron Ponsonby of Roehampton, Senior Deputy Speaker. |
| Lord Popat | 10 July 2010 | Conservative | Founder and chairman of hospitality and health care firm TLC Group Ltd |
| Baroness Porter of Fulwood | 13 February 2024 | Conservative | Downing Street Deputy Chief of Staff under Prime Minister Liz Truss |
| Lord Porter of Spalding | 15 October 2015 | Conservative | Leader of South Holland District Council |
| Lord Powell of Bayswater | 15 February 2000 | Crossbench | Former diplomat |
| Baroness Prashar | 15 July 1999 | Crossbench | Chairman of the Judicial Appointments Commission and president of the Royal Commonwealth Society |
| Baroness Prentis of Banbury | 13 May 2025 | Conservative | Former MP for Banbury (2015–2024), Attorney General for England and Wales (2022–2024), and Advocate General for Northern Ireland (2022–2024) |
| Lord Prentis of Leeds | 18 November 2022 | Labour | Trade unionist, General Secretary of Unison (2001–2021) and President of the Trades Union Congress (2008) |
| Lord Price | 29 February 2016 | Conservative | Businessman, writer, former managing director of Waitrose, former store manager for John Lewis |
| Baroness Primarolo | 26 October 2015 | Labour | Former MP for Bristol South (1987–2015) |
| Lord Prior of Brampton | 29 May 2015 | Conservative | Former MP for North Norfolk (1997–2001), former chair of NHS England (2018–2022) |
| Baroness Prosser | 11 June 2004 | Labour | Deputy Chair of the Equality and Human Rights Commission and President of the Trades Union Congress (1996) |
| Lord Purvis of Tweed | 13 September 2013 | Liberal Democrat | Former MSP for Tweeddale, Ettrick and Lauderdale (2003–2011) |
| Baroness Rafferty | 10 February 2025 | Labour | Nurse, researcher, and professor |
| Baroness Ramsey of Wall Heath | 13 March 2024 | Labour | Former chair of Cambridge University Hospitals NHS Foundation Trust, former vice chair of University College London Hospitals |
| Lord Randall of Uxbridge | 25 June 2018 | Conservative | Former MP for Uxbridge and Uxbridge and South Ruislip (1997–2015) |
| Lord Ranger | 11 October 2019 | Conservative | Businessman, founder of Sun Mark |
| Lord Ranger of Northwood | 11 July 2023 | Conservative | Strategy and communications executive, board member of TechUK |
| Lord Raval | 29 January 2025 | Labour | Lawyer and professor |
| Lord Ravensdale ‡ | 12 June 2026 (Note: Lord Ravendale was previously a member of the House by virtue of his hereditary peerage from 3 April 2019 to 29 April 2026.) | Crossbench | Hereditary peer who sits by virtue of a life peerage, Baron Ravensdale of Little Eaton; Engineer, project director for Atkins; former excepted hereditary peer (2019–2026) |
| Baroness Rawlings | 5 October 1994 | Conservative | President of the National Council for Voluntary Organisations and former chairman of King's College London Council |
| Lord Razzall | 22 October 1997 | Liberal Democrat | Solicitor, cricketer, former Treasurer of the Liberal Party and for the Liberal Democrats |
| Lord Reay ‡ | 15 June 2026 (Note: Lord Reay was previously a member of the House by virtue of his hereditary peerage from 28 January 2019 to 29 April 2026.) | Conservative | Hereditary peer who sits by virtue of a life peerage, Baron Reay of Reay; Financier and Clan Chief of Clan Mackay |
| Baroness Rebuck | 18 September 2014 | Labour | Chairman of Penguin Random House |
| Lord Redesdale ‡ | 18 April 2000 (Note: Lord Redesdale was previously a member of the House by virtue of his hereditary peerage from 1991 until the House of Lords Act in 1999.) | Non-affiliated | Hereditary peer who sits by virtue of a life peerage, Baron Mitford |
| Baroness Redfern | 7 October 2015 | Conservative | Former Leader of North Lincolnshire Council |
| Lord Redwood | 30 January 2026 | Conservative | MP for Wokingham (1987–2024), Secretary of State for Wales (1993–1995) |
| Lord Rees of Easton | 4 February 2025 | Labour | Former Mayor of Bristol (2016–2024) |
| Lord Rees of Ludlow | 6 September 2005 | Crossbench | Professor of Astronomy at the University of Cambridge and Astronomer Royal, president of the Royal Society |
| Lord Reid of Cardowan | 16 July 2010 | Labour | Former MP for Motherwell North (1987–1997), for Hamilton North and Bellshill (1997–2005) and for Airdrie and Shotts (2005–2010), Secretaries of State for Scotland, Health, Defence and Home Secretary |
| Lord Rennard | 21 July 1999 | Liberal Democrat | Former chief executive of the Liberal Democrats |
| Lord Richards of Herstmonceux | 24 February 2014 | Crossbench | Former Chief of the Defence Staff |
| Lord Ricketts | 17 October 2016 | Crossbench | Former UK Ambassador to France, former National Security Adviser and former Permanent Under-Secretary of State for Foreign Affairs |
| Lord Risby | 24 December 2010 | Conservative | Vice-chairman of the Conservative Party, responsible for business links in the City of London and former MP for Bury St Edmunds (1992–1997) and for West Suffolk (1997–2010) |
| Baroness Ritchie of Downpatrick | 16 October 2019 | Labour | Former MP for South Down (2010–2017) |
| Lord Robathan | 13 October 2015 | Conservative | Former MP for South Leicestershire (2010–2015) and for Blaby (1992–2010) |
| Lord Roberts of Belgravia | 1 November 2022 | Conservative | Historian and journalist, visiting professor at the Department of War Studies, King's College London |
| Lord Roberts of Llandudno | 15 June 2004 | Liberal Democrat | Former president of the Welsh Liberal Democrats |
| Lord Robertson of Port Ellen | 24 August 1999 | Labour | Former MP for Hamilton (1978–1997) and for Hamilton South (1997–1999), NATO Secretary General and Secretary of State for Defence |
| Lord Roborough ‡ | 10 June 2026 (Note: Lord Roborough was previously a member of the House by virtue of his hereditary peerage from 25 October 2022 to 29 April 2026.) | Conservative | Hereditary peer who sits by virtue of a life peerage, Baron Lopes; Investment banker; former excepted hereditary peer (2022–2026) |
| Baroness Rock | 15 October 2015 | Conservative | Businesswoman and consultant |
| Lord Roe of West Wickham | 13 January 2026 | Labour | Former Commissioner of the London Fire Brigade (2020–2025) |
| Lord Rogan | 16 July 1999 | Ulster Unionist | Former president of the Ulster Unionist Party |
| Lord Rook | 20 January 2025 | Labour | Anglican priest |
| Lord Rooker | 16 June 2001 | Labour | Former MP for Birmingham Perry Barr (1974–2001) and Chairman of the Food Standards Agency |
| Lord Rose of Monewden | 17 September 2014 | Conservative | Former chief executive and chairman of Marks & Spencer |
| Lord Rosenfield | 13 July 2023 | Non-affiliated | Former Downing Street Chief of Staff, former principal private secretary to the Chancellor of the Exchequer |
| Lord Ross of Nevill Holt | 25 August 2026 | Conservative | Co-founder of Carphone Warehouse |
| Lord Rowlands | 28 June 2004 | Labour | Former MP for Cardiff North (1966–1970), for Merthyr Tydfil (1972–1983) and for Merthyr Tydfil and Rhymney (1983–2001) |
| Baroness Royall of Blaisdon | 25 June 2004 | Labour Co-op | Former Leader of the House of Lords |
| Lord Russell | 19 June 2023 | Liberal Democrat | Hereditary peer who sits by virtue of a life peerage, Baron Russell of Forest Hill; Photographer; former excepted hereditary peer (2023–2026) |
| Lord Russell of Liverpool ‡ | 8 June 2026 (Note: Lord Russell of Liverpool was previously a member of the House by virtue of his hereditary peerage from 8 April 1981 to 11 November 1999, and again from 11 December 2014 to 29 April 2026.) | Crossbench | Hereditary peer who sits by virtue of a life peerage, Baron Russell of Kiloran; Business consultant; former excepted hereditary peer (2014–2026) |
| Lord Saatchi | 4 October 1996 | Conservative | Co-founder and executive director of Saatchi and Saatchi and M&C Saatchi |
| Lord Sahota | 2 November 2022 | Labour | Councillor on the Telford and Wrekin Council |
| Lord Sanders of Hallingdal | 4 September 2026 | Conservative | Chief of the General Staff, British Army (2022–2024) |
| Baroness Sanderson of Welton | 8 October 2019 | Conservative | Journalist for The Mail on Sunday |
| Lord Sarfraz | 8 September 2020 | Conservative | Prime Ministerial Trade Envoy to Singapore, businessman and former treasurer to the Conservative Party |
| Baroness Sarpong | 21 August 2026 | Labour | Broadcaster |
| Lord Sarwar | 24 August 2026 | Labour | Leader of Scottish Labour (2021–2026); MSP for Glasgow (2016–2026); MP for Glasgow Central (2010–2015) |
| Lord Sassoon | 29 May 2010 | Conservative | Commercial Secretary to the Treasury and former president of the Financial Action Task Force on Money Laundering |
| Baroness Sater | 20 June 2018 | Conservative | Marketing executive and magistrate |
| Baroness Scotland of Asthal | 30 October 1997 | Labour | Commonwealth Secretary-General, former Attorney General for England and Wales and former Advocate General for Northern Ireland |
| Baroness Scott of Bybrook | 8 October 2015 | Conservative | Former leader of Wiltshire County Council |
| Baroness Scott of Needham Market | 11 May 2000 | Liberal Democrat | Former president of the Liberal Democrats |
| Lord Scriven | 19 September 2014 | Liberal Democrat | Former leader of Sheffield City Council |
| Baroness Seccombe | 14 February 1991 | Conservative | Former Councillor on West Midlands Council (1977–1981) and former Conservative Party Vice Chair (1987–1997) |
| Lord Sedwill | 11 September 2020 | Crossbench | Former Cabinet Secretary |
| Lord Sentamu ‡ | 27 April 2021 (Note: Lord Sentamu was previously a member of the House as an ex officio Lord Spiritual while Archbishop of York from 2005 to 2020.) | Crossbench | Former Archbishop of York |
| Lord Sewell of Sanderstead | 16 December 2022 | Conservative | Chair of the Commission on Race and Ethnic Disparities |
| Baroness Shackleton of Belgravia | 21 December 2010 | Conservative | Solicitor |
| Baroness Shah | 9 January 2026 | Labour | Member of Brent London Borough Council for Kingsbury |
| Lord Shamash | 6 March 2024 | Labour | Solicitor, former councilor on the Barnet London Borough Council |
| Lord Sharkey | 20 December 2010 | Liberal Democrat | Chairman of the Liberal Democrat 2010 general election campaign |
| Lord Sharma | 20 August 2024 | Conservative | Former MP for Reading West (2010–2024), Secretary of State for International Development, Business Secretary and President for COP26 |
| Lord Sharpe of Epsom | 15 September 2020 | Conservative | Broker |
| Baroness Shawcross-Wolfson | 28 May 2025 | Conservative | Political advisor, director of the Number 10 Policy Unit under Prime Minister Rishi Sunak |
| Baroness Sheehan | 2 October 2015 | Liberal Democrat | Former councilor for Kew on Richmond upon Thames London Borough Council |
| Baroness Shephard of Northwold | 21 June 2005 | Conservative | Former MP for South West Norfolk (1987–2005), Secretary of State for Education and Employment and Minister of State for Agriculture, Fisheries and Food |
| Lord Sherbourne of Didsbury | 12 September 2013 | Conservative | Political Secretary for Prime Minister Margaret Thatcher and Chief of Staff to Conservative leader Michael Howard |
| Baroness Sherlock | 17 June 2010 | Labour | Former chief executive of the Refugee Council, former chief executive of the National Council for One Parent Families and former director of the education charity UKCOSA |
| Baroness Shields | 16 September 2014 | Conservative | Former digital adviser to David Cameron, former CEO of Tech City UK |
| Lord Shinkwin | 14 October 2015 | Conservative | Former commissioner of the Equality and Human Rights Commission, public affairs consultant |
| Lord Shipley | 14 July 2010 | Liberal Democrat | Former leader of Newcastle City Council |
| Lord Sikka | 10 September 2020 | Labour | Professor of accounting |
| Lord Singh of Solihull | 19 August 2026 | Conservative | Professor of Social and Community Psychiatry, University of Warwick (since 2006) |
| Lord Singh of Wimbledon | 12 October 2011 | Crossbench | Journalist and broadcaster, former mine manager |
| Baroness Smith of Basildon | 7 July 2010 | Labour Co-op | Leader of the House of Lords and Lord Privy Seal (2024–present), former Minister of State for the Third Sector, former MP for Basildon (1997–2010) |
| Baroness Smith of Cluny | 9 October 2024 | Labour | Advocate General for Scotland (2024–present) |
| Lord Smith of Finsbury | 22 June 2005 | Labour | Former MP for Islington South and Finsbury (1983–2005), Secretary of State for Culture, Media and Sport and chair of the Advertising Standards Authority |
| Lord Smith of Hindhead | 29 September 2015 | Conservative | Chief executive of the Association of Conservative Clubs |
| Lord Smith of Kelvin | 29 May 2008 | Crossbench | Chairman of Weir Group and Scottish and Southern Energy former governor of the British Broadcasting Corporation |
| Baroness Smith of Llanfaes | 13 March 2024 | Plaid Cymru | Former acting president of National Union of Students Wales, youngest person ever to receive a life peerage. |
| Baroness Smith of Malvern | 17 July 2024 | Labour | Minister of State for Skills, Apprenticeships and Higher Education (since 2024), former MP for Redditch (1997–2010), former Home Secretary (2007–2009) |
| Baroness Smith of Newnham | 12 September 2014 | Liberal Democrat | Senior lecturer in international relations in the Department of Politics and International Studies (POLIS), Cambridge University |
| Lord Smith of Ranmoor | 17 August 2026 | Labour | Business executive and former CEO of the Food Standards Agency |
| Lord Soames of Fletching | 28 October 2022 | Conservative | Former MP for Crawley (1983–1997) and Mid Sussex (1997–2019), former Minister of State for the Armed Forces, grandson of Sir Winston Churchill |
| Lord Spellar | 12 August 2024 | Labour | Former MP for Birmingham Northfield (1982–1983), Warley West (1992–1997), and Warley (1992–1997) |
| Lord Spencer of Alresford | 17 September 2020 | Conservative | Founder of NEX Group |
| Baroness Spielman | 9 May 2025 | Conservative | Former chief inspector of Ofsted (2017–2023) |
| Lord Stace | 20 August 2026 | Labour | Chief Global Impact Officer at Howden Group (since 2025) |
| Lord Stansgate ‡ | 3 June 2026 (Note: Viscount Stansgate was previously a member of the House by virtue of his hereditary peerage from 15 July 2021 to 29 April 2026.) | Labour | Hereditary peer who sits by virtue of a life peerage, Baron Stansgate of Holland Park; Consultant to the American Chemical Society; former excepted hereditary peer (2021–2026) |
| Baroness Stedman-Scott | 12 July 2010 | Conservative | Chief executive of Tomorrow's People Trust |
| Lord Stephen | 2 February 2011 | Liberal Democrat | Former MP for Kincardine and Deeside (1991–1992), Leader of the Scottish Liberal Democrats and Deputy First Minister of Scotland |
| Lord Sterling of Plaistow | 17 January 1991 | Conservative | Chairman of Motability, former executive chairman of P&O |
| Lord Stern of Brentford | 10 December 2007 | Crossbench | IG Patel Professor of Economics and Government at the London School of Economics, author of the Stern Report |
| Lord Stevens of Birmingham | 5 July 2021 | Crossbench | Former chief executive of NHS England |
| Lord Stevens of Kirkwhelpington | 6 April 2005 | Crossbench | Former Commissioner of the Metropolitan Police |
| Lord Stevens of Ludgate | 27 March 1987 | Conservative Ind. | Former chairman of United Newspapers |
| Lord Stevenson of Balmacara | 13 July 2010 | Labour | Former adviser to Gordon Brown |
| Lord Stewart of Dirleton | 6 November 2020 | Conservative | Advocate General for Scotland |
| Lord Stirrup | 28 January 2011 | Crossbench | Former Chief of the Defence Staff |
| Lord Stockwood | 9 October 2025 | Labour | Businessman, part owner and former chairman of Grimsby Town F.C. |
| Lord Stoneham of Droxford | 17 January 2011 | Liberal Democrat | Liberal Democrats HQ Operations Director |
| Lord Storey | 2 February 2011 | Liberal Democrat | Councillor and former leader of Liverpool City Council |
| Baroness Stowell of Beeston | 10 January 2011 | Conservative | Former Leader of the House of Lords and Lord Privy Seal, former Parliamentary Under Secretary of State for Communities and Local Government, Whip, BBC Head of Corporate Affairs, and civil servant |
| Lord Strasburger | 10 January 2011 | Liberal Democrat | Businessman |
| Lord Strathclyde ‡ | 3 June 2026 (Note: Lord Strathclyde was previously a member of the House by virtue of his hereditary peerage from 18 March 1986 to 29 April 2026.) | Conservative | Hereditary peer who sits by virtue of a life peerage, Baron Strathclyde of Barskimming; Former leader of the House of Lords; former excepted hereditary peer (1999–2026) |
| Baroness Stroud | 1 October 2015 | Conservative | Political adviser, CEO of the Legatum Institute, former executive director of the Centre for Social Justice |
| Baroness Stuart of Edgbaston | 7 September 2020 | Crossbench | Former MP for Birmingham Edgbaston from 1997 to 2017 |
| Lord Sugar | 20 July 2009 | Crossbench | TV personality and businessman |
| Baroness Sugg | 30 August 2016 | Conservative | Political adviser |
| Baroness Suttie | 17 September 2013 | Liberal Democrat | Teacher, political consultant, government adviser and lobbyist |
| Baroness Swinburne | 20 June 2023 | Conservative | Former MEP for Wales (2009–2019) |
| Lord Swire | 1 November 2022 | Conservative | Former MP for East Devon (2001–2019) and former Minister of State for Northern Ireland and for Europe and the Americas |
| Baroness Symons of Vernham Dean | 7 October 1996 | Labour | Trade unionist, General Secretary of the FDA (1989–1997), Chair of the Arab British Chamber of Commerce |
| Lord Tarassenko | 10 June 2024 | Crossbench | Electrical engineer and academic, president of Reuben College, Oxford |
| Baroness Taylor of Bolton | 13 June 2005 | Labour | Former MP for Bolton West (1974–1983), former MP for Dewsbury (1987–2005), Cabinet minister (1997–2001) |
| Lord Taylor of Goss Moor | 16 July 2010 | Liberal Democrat | Former MP for Truro (1987–1997) and then Truro and St Austell (1997–2010), former chair of the Liberal Democrats |
| Lord Taylor of Holbeach | 31 May 2006 | Conservative | Government Chief Whip in the Lords |
| Baroness Taylor of Stevenage | 28 October 2022 | Labour Co-op | Leader of Stevenage Borough Council and councillor for Hertfordshire County Council |
| Lord Taylor of Warwick | 2 October 1996 | Non-affiliated | Barrister, radio and television presenter, former chancellor of Bournemouth University |
| Baroness Teather | 27 January 2026 | Liberal Democrat | MP for Brent East (2003–2010) and Brent Central (2010–2015) |
| Lord Teverson | 1 June 2006 | Liberal Democrat | Former MEP for Cornwall and West Plymouth (1994–1999) |
| Lord Thomas of Cwmgiedd | 4 October 2013 | Crossbench | Former Lord Chief Justice of England and Wales (2013–2017) |
| Lord Thomas of Gresford | 30 September 1996 | Liberal Democrat | Deputy High Court Judge |
| Baroness Thomas of Winchester | 26 May 2006 | Liberal Democrat | Political activist and election agent for the Liberal Party |
| Baroness Thornhill | 21 October 2015 | Liberal Democrat | Teacher, former Mayor of Watford |
| Baroness Thornton | 23 July 1998 | Labour Co-op | Former chair of the London Labour Party, former general secretary of the Fabian Society, chief executive of the Young Foundation |
| Lord Timpson | 18 July 2024 | Labour | Minister of State for Prisons, Parole and Probation (since 2024), Chancellor of Keele University (since 2022), CEO of Timpson (2002–2024) |
| Lord Tope | 4 October 1994 | Liberal Democrat | Former MP for Sutton and Cheam (1972–1974) and Councillor |
| Lord Touhig | 28 June 2010 | Labour Co-op | Former MP for Islwyn 1995–2010 |
| Lord Trees | 3 July 2012 | Crossbench | Chairman of the Moredun Research Institute, veterinarian and professor emeritus of veterinary parasitology at the University of Liverpool |
| Lord True | 23 December 2010 | Conservative | Former head of the Prime Minister's Policy Unit |
| Lord Truscott | 10 June 2004 | Non-affiliated | Petroleum and mining consultant, former MEP for Hertfordshire (1994–1999) |
| Lord Tugendhat | 15 October 1993 | Conservative | Former MP for Cities of London and Westminster (1970–1974) and for City of London and Westminster South (1974–1977) |
| Lord Tunnicliffe | 2 June 2004 | Labour | Pilot and railwayman, chairman of the Rail Safety and Standards Board, former chairman of the United Kingdom Atomic Energy Authority, former managing director for London Underground |
| Lord Turnbull | 11 October 2005 | Crossbench | Former Cabinet Secretary and Head of the Home Civil Service |
| Lord Turner of Ecchinswell | 7 September 2005 | Crossbench | Chair of the Climate Change Committee and former chair of the Financial Services Authority |
| Baroness Twycross | 7 November 2022 | Labour | Former member of the London Assembly, Deputy Mayor of London |
| Baroness Tyler of Enfield | 28 January 2011 | Liberal Democrat | Chief executive of Relate |
| Lord Tyrie | 12 June 2018 | Non-affiliated | Former MP for Chichester (1997–2017) |
| Baroness Uddin | 18 July 1998 | Non-affiliated | Community activist, former Councillor in the London Borough of Tower Hamlets |
| Lord Udny-Lister | 6 November 2020 | Conservative | Prime Minister's Chief Strategic Advisor |
| Baroness Ussher | 3 September 2026 | Labour | MP for Burnley (2005–2010); Economic Secretary to the Treasury (2007–2008) |
| Baroness Vadera | 11 July 2007 | Non-affiliated | Investment banker and economist, chair of Prudential plc, former chair of Santander UK, former government adviser |
| Lord Vaizey of Didcot | 1 September 2020 | Conservative | Former MP for Wantage (2005–2019) |
| Baroness Valentine | 10 October 2005 | Crossbench | Financial manager |
| Lord Vallance of Balham | 17 July 2024 | Labour | Minister of State for Science, Research and Innovation (since 2024), chair of the Natural History Museum in London (since 2022), clinical pharmacologist. |
| Lord Vaux of Harrowden ‡ | 10 June 2026 (Note: Lord Vaux of Harrowden was previously a member of the House by virtue of his hereditary peerage from 11 August 2017 to 29 April 2026.) | Crossbench | Hereditary peer who sits by virtue of a life peerage, Baron Gilbey; Chartered accountant; former excepted hereditary peer (2017–2026) |
| Lord Verdirame | 2 November 2022 | Non-affiliated | Barrister, legal scholar, professor of international law at King's College London |
| Baroness Vere of Norbiton | 30 August 2016 | Conservative | Former executive director of the Girls' Schools Association |
| Lord Verjee | 17 September 2013 | Liberal Democrat | Businessman |
| Baroness Verma | 2 June 2006 | Conservative | Businesswoman |
| Lord Wakeham | 24 April 1992 | Conservative | Former MP for Maldon (1974–1983) and South Colchester and Maldon (1983–1992) |
| Lord Waldegrave of North Hill | 28 July 1999 | Conservative | Former MP for Bristol West (1979–1997), chancellor of the University of Reading (since 2016), Provost of Eton (since 2009) |
| Lord Walker of Aldringham | 19 December 2006 | Crossbench | Former Chief of the Defence Staff |
| Lord Walker of Broxton | 20 January 2026 | Labour | Businessman, executive chairman of Iceland |
| Lord Wallace of Saltaire | 19 December 1995 | Liberal Democrat | Emeritus professor of international relations at the London School of Economics, former director of studies at the Royal Institute of International Affairs |
| Baroness Walmsley | 15 May 2000 | Liberal Democrat | Cytologist, professor and PR consultant |
| Lord Walney | 4 September 2020 | Crossbench | Former MP for Barrow and Furness (2010–2019) |
| Baroness Warsi | 11 October 2007 | Non-affiliated | Solicitor, former chairman of the Conservative Party, former Minister of State for Faith and Communities |
| Baroness Warwick of Undercliffe | 10 July 1999 | Labour | Trade unionist, General Secretary of the Association of University Teachers (1983–1993) |
| Lord Wasserman | 11 January 2011 | Non-affiliated | Internationally recognised expert on management of police forces |
| Baroness Watkins of Tavistock | 2 November 2015 | Crossbench | Professor emeritus of healthcare management at the University of Plymouth |
| Lord Watson of Invergowrie | 6 November 1997 | Labour | Former MP for Glasgow Central (1989–1997) and MSP for Glasgow Cathcart (1999–2005) |
| Lord Watts | 23 October 2015 | Labour | Former MP for St Helens North (1997–2015) |
| Lord Wei | 28 May 2010 | Conservative | Social entrepreneur and political consultant |
| Lord Weir of Ballyholme | 16 November 2022 | Democratic Unionist | Former Minister of Education in Northern Ireland, former member of the Northern Ireland Assembly for North Down (1998–2017) and for Strangford (2017–2022) |
| Duke of Wellington ‡ | 1 June 2026 (Note: The Duke of Wellington was previously a member of the House by virtue of his hereditary peerage from 17 September 2015 to 29 April 2026.) | Crossbench | Hereditary peer who sits by virtue of a life peerage, Baron Wellington of Stratfield Saye; Former MEP for Surrey (1979–1984) and Surrey West (1984–1989); former excepted hereditary peer (2015–2026) |
| Lord West of Spithead | 9 July 2007 | Labour | Former First Sea Lord and Chief of the Naval Staff and Parliamentary Under-Secretary of State for Security and Counter-Terrorism |
| Lord Wharton of Yarm | 2 September 2020 | Conservative | Chair of the Office for Students (since 2021), former MP for Stockton South (2010–2017) |
| Baroness Wheatcroft | 22 December 2010 | Crossbench | Journalist and editor-in-chief of the Wall Street Journal Europe and former editor of the Sunday Telegraph |
| Baroness Wheeler | 20 June 2010 | Labour | Trade unionist (UNISON) |
| Baroness Whitaker | 5 August 1999 | Labour | Former magistrate |
| Lord Whitby | 10 September 2013 | Conservative | Former leader of Birmingham City Council |
| Baroness White of Tufnell Park | 17 July 2025 | Crossbench | Businesswoman, former chairman of the John Lewis Partnership (2020–2024), former chief executive of Ofcom (2015–2019) |
| Lord Whitehead | 19 November 2025 | Labour | Former MP for Southampton Test (1997–2024) |
| Lord Whitty | 21 October 1996 | Labour | General Secretary of the Labour Party (1985–1994) |
| Lord Wigley | 19 January 2011 | Plaid Cymru | Former MP Caernarfon for (1974–2001) and Leader of Plaid Cymru |
| Baroness Wilcox of Newport | 14 October 2019 | Labour Co-op | Newport City Councillor, former head of the Welsh Local Government Association, former teacher |
| Lord Willetts | 16 October 2015 | Conservative | Former MP for Havant (1992–2015) |
| Baroness Williams of Trafford | 20 September 2013 | Conservative | Minister of State for Home Affairs |
| Lord Willis of Knaresborough | 18 June 2010 | Liberal Democrat | Former MP for Harrogate and Knaresborough (1997–2010) |
| Baroness Willis of Summertown | 8 July 2022 | Crossbench | Biologist, professor of biodiversity at the University of Oxford and of biology at the University of Bergen, principal of St Edmund Hall |
| Lord Wills | 10 July 2010 | Labour | Former MP for Swindon North (1997–2010) |
| Lord Wilson of Sedgefield | 16 January 2025 | Labour | Former MP for Sedgefield (2007–2019) |
| Lord Winston | 18 December 1995 | Labour | Professor of Science and Society and emeritus professor of fertility studies at Imperial College London |
| Baroness Winterton of Doncaster | 13 August 2024 | Labour | Former MP for Doncaster Central (1997–2024) |
| Baroness Wolf of Dulwich | 2 December 2014 | Crossbench | Sir Roy Griffiths Professor of Public Sector Management at King's College London |
| Lord Wolfson of Aspley Guise | 18 June 2010 | Conservative | Businessman and CEO of Next plc |
| Lord Wolfson of Tredegar | 30 December 2020 | Conservative | Barrister |
| Lord Wood of Anfield | 15 January 2011 | Labour | Lecturer in politics at the University of Oxford and co-founder of Nexus think-tank |
| Lord Woodley | 2 November 2020 | Labour | Trade unionist, General Secretary of the Transport and General Workers' Union (2004–2007) and General Secretary of the Unite the Union (2007–2011) |
| Lord Woolf^{♎︎︎} | 1 October 1992 | Crossbench | Former Law Lord and chairman of the Institute of Advanced Legal Studies, visiting professor of law at University College London |
| Lord Woolley of Woodford | 14 October 2019 | Crossbench | Principal of Homerton College, Cambridge; political activist and government adviser, founder of Operation Black Vote |
| Lord Wormald | 27 August 2026 | Crossbench | Cabinet Secretary and Head of the Civil Service (2024–2026) |
| Lord Wrigglesworth | 5 September 2013 | Liberal Democrat | Former MP for Thornaby (1974–1983) and for Stockton South (1983–1987) |
| Baroness Wyld | 22 June 2017 | Conservative | Communications consultant |
| Lord Young of Acton | 21 January 2025 | Conservative | Founder and director of the Free Speech Union, associate editor of The Spectator, former associate editor at Quillette |
| Lord Young of Cookham | 29 September 2015 | Conservative | Former MP for Acton (1974–1983), for Ealing Acton (1983–1997) and for North West Hampshire (1997–2015) |
| Baroness Young of Hornsey | 22 June 2004 | Crossbench | Chancellor of the University of Nottingham, actress, social worker, lecturer in media studies. |
| Lord Young of Norwood Green | 25 June 2004 | Labour | Trade unionist, General Secretary of the National Communications Union (1989–1995), General Secretary of the Communication Workers Union (1995–1998) and President of the Trades Union Congress (2001) |
| Baroness Young of Old Scone | 4 November 1997 | Non-affiliated | Former chancellor of Cranfield University |
| Lord Young of Old Windsor | 13 June 2023 | Crossbench | Former Private Secretary to the Sovereign |

== Current non-sitting members ==
There are also peers who remain members of the House, but are currently ineligible to sit and vote.

=== Peers on leave of absence ===
Under section 21 of the Standing Orders of the House of Lords, peers may obtain a leave of absence for the remainder of a parliamentary session. The following peers are currently on a leave of absence.

| Peer | Date joined | Party | On leave since | Notes |
|---|---|---|---|---|
| Lord Case | 17 July 2025 | Crossbench | 24 July 2026 | Civil servant, former Cabinet Secretary and Head of the Home Civil Service (2020–2024) |
| Lord Davies of Abersoch | 2 February 2009 | Non-affiliated | 9 June 2022 | Former minister of state for trade promotion and investment, former chairman of Standard Chartered Bank and Nordic Windpower, currently chairman of PineBridge Investments and partner at Corsair Private Equity partners |
| Lord Feldman of Elstree | 17 December 2010 | Conservative | 22 June 2020 | Chief executive and former managing director of Jayroma (London) Ltd, former chairman of the Conservative Party |
| Lord Freud | 27 June 2009 | Conservative | 16 December 2021 | Former vice-chairman of investing banking at UBS AG |
| Lord Geidt | 3 November 2017 | Crossbench | 12 June 2026 | Former Private Secretary to Queen Elizabeth II |
| Lord Hague of Richmond | 9 October 2015 | Conservative | 31 January 2021 | Former MP for Richmond (Yorks) (1989–2015), former Foreign Secretary, former Leader of the House of Commons and former Leader of the Opposition |
| Lord Hardie | 21 May 1997 | Crossbench | 12 October 2026 | Former Lord Advocate and former Senator of the College of Justice |
| Lord Harris of Peckham | 11 January 1996 | Conservative | 23 March 2026 | Chairman of Carpetright |
| Lord Hutton of Furness | 27 June 2010 | Labour | 20 October 2026 | Former MP for Barrow and Furness (1992–2010), Secretary of State for Business, Enterprise and Regulatory Reform and Secretary of State for Defence |
| Lord Llewellyn of Steep | 20 October 2016 | Conservative | 1 November 2016 | Director General, Political at the Foreign, Commonwealth & Development Office (since 2026), former UK Ambassador to Italy (2022–2026), former UK Ambassador to France (2016–2021), and former Downing Street Chief of Staff (2010–2016) |
| Baroness Longfield | 31 January 2025 | Non-affiliated | 9 December 2025 | Children's rights advocate, former Children's Commissioner for England (2015–2021) |
| Lord Malloch-Brown | 9 July 2007 | Crossbench | 30 July 2024 | Former administrator of the United Nations Development Programme and briefly Deputy Secretary-General of the United Nations |
| Baroness Mone | 30 September 2015 | Non-affiliated | 6 December 2022 | Businesswoman, founder of Ultimo |
| Baroness Shafik | 30 September 2020 | Crossbench | 10 September 2025 | Former president of Columbia University, former president and vice-chancellor of the London School of Economics, former Deputy Governor of the Bank of England |
| Lord Watson of Wyre Forest | 21 November 2022 | Labour | 26 March 2026 | Former MP for West Bromwich East (2001–2019), former chair of the Labour Party, former deputy leader of the Labour Party, former Lord Commissioner of the Treasury, chairman of UK Music |
| Baroness Worthington | 31 January 2011 | Crossbench | 17 April 2023 | Environmental campaigner, founder of Sandbag |

=== Peers disqualified ===
Under section 137(3) of the Constitutional Reform Act 2005, holders of certain judicial offices who are peers are disqualified from sitting and voting in the House of Lords while in office. The following peers are currently subject to this provision.

| Peer | Date joined | Party | Disqualified since | Notes |
|---|---|---|---|---|
| Baroness Carr of Walton-on-the-Hill | 6 November 2023 | Non‑affiliated | 6 November 2023 | Lady Chief Justice of England and Wales |
| Lord Reed of Allermuir | 11 January 2020 | Crossbench | 11 January 2020 | President of the Supreme Court |

=== Peers suspended ===
The following peers are currently suspended from the House in accordance with section 1 of the House of Lords (Expulsion and Suspension) Act 2015.

| Peer | Date joined | Party | Suspended since | Length of suspension | Notes |
|---|---|---|---|---|---|
| Lord Maginnis of Drumglass | 20 July 2001 | Independent Ulster Unionist | 7 December 2020 | Minimum 18 months | Former MP for Fermanagh and South Tyrone (1983–2001) |

== Incoming members ==
The following people have been announced to become peers but have not yet received their writ of summons or letters patent and have not been introduced.

| Name | Party | Announced | Notes |
|---|---|---|---|
| Michael Briggs, Lord Briggs of Westbourne | Crossbench | 8 September 2026 | Justice of the Supreme Court of the United Kingdom (2017–present); President of the Supreme Court of the United Kingdom (designated from 2027) |

== Notes ==
^♎︎︎ Appointed pursuant to the Appellate Jurisdiction Act 1876 rather than the Life Peerages Act 1958

== See also ==
- List of former members of the House of Lords (2000–present)
- List of hereditary peers removed under the House of Lords Act 1999
- List of life peerages
- List of excepted hereditary peers
- List of hereditary peers in the House of Lords by virtue of a life peerage
- Women in the House of Lords
  - List of female members of the House of Lords
