= Daniel Brennan, Baron Brennan =

British lawyer and judge

The Right Honourable The Lord Brennan KCSG KC
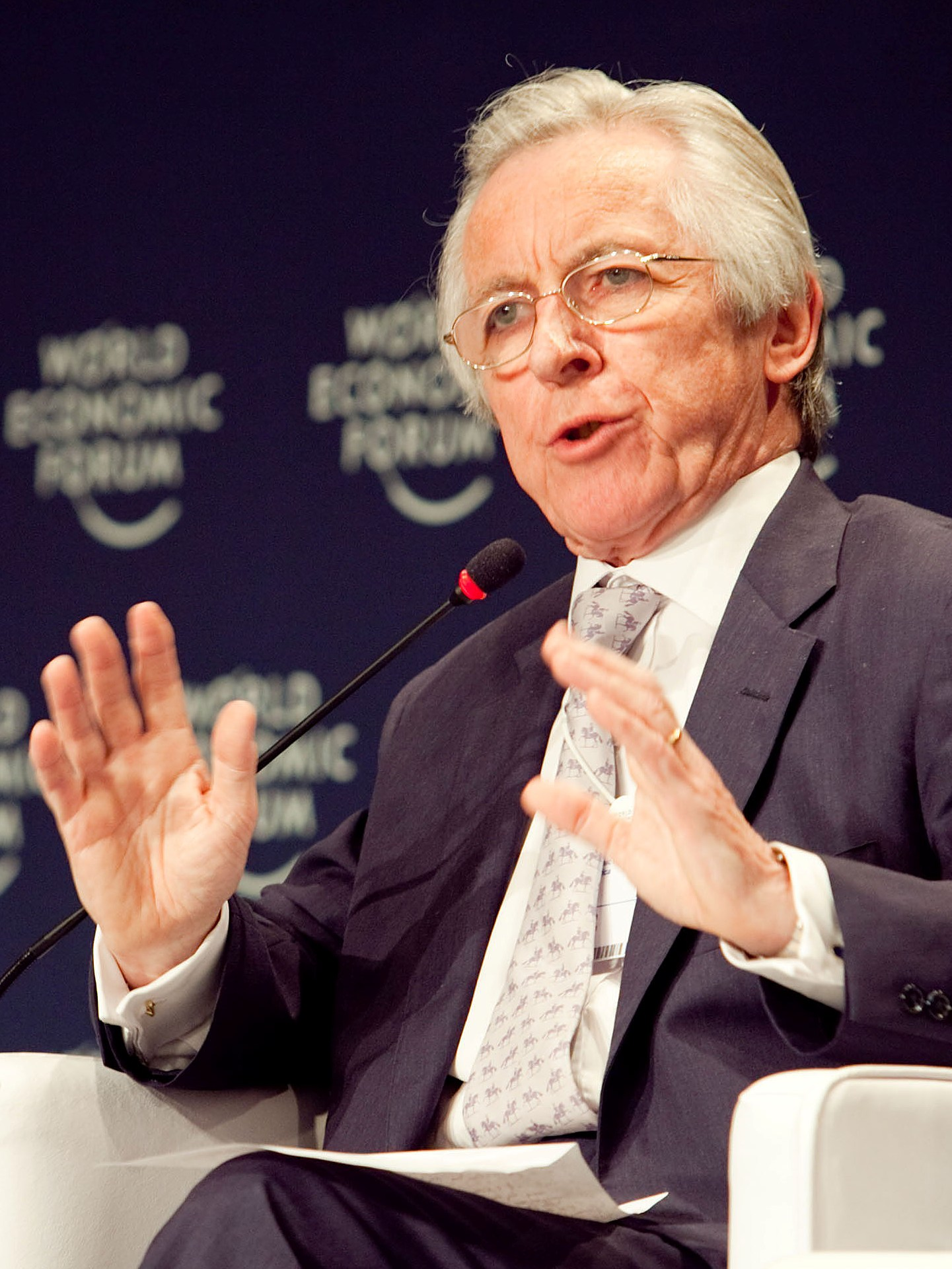
- Brennan speaking at the World Economic Forum on Latin America 2009

Member of the House of Lords
- Lord Temporal
- Life peerage 2 May 2000

Personal details
- Born: 19 March 1942 (age 84)
- Party: Labour
- Spouse: Pilar Sánchez Moya (m. 1968)
- Education: Victoria University of Manchester (LLB)

Daniel Joseph Brennan, Baron Brennan, KCSG, KC (born 19 March 1942) is a British life peer and barrister.

== Early life and background ==
Brennan was educated at St. Bede's Grammar School, Bradford, and graduated with a Bachelor of Law degree from Manchester University, where subsequently he was awarded an honorary Doctorate in 2000.

== Career ==
He was called to the bar at Gray's Inn in 1967. A member of Matrix Chambers, he specialises in personal injury and medical work, commercial law, international business issues, public and private international law, and international arbitration. He became a Queen's Counsel in 1985, and he is a Deputy High Court Judge and a Recorder in the Crown Court, a former member of the Criminal Injuries Compensation Board and ex-Chairman of the Personal Injuries Bar Association.

Lord Brennan is the Bar representative on the Council of the International Bar Association. He is also a member of the bars of the Republic of Ireland and Northern Ireland. In 2000, The Lawyer Magazine described him as Barrister of the Year.

Lord Brennan is Chair of the APPG on Legal and Constitutional Affairs, which is a cross-party grouping of MPs and Peers with Parliament focussed on discussing issues relating to the legal profession and the reform of the law and constitution.

He has an environmental, product liability and medical negligence practice involving multi-party actions such as the insurance claims from the Paddington rail crash, the combined oral contraceptive pill litigation and, in the past, the local residents' claims arising from the Canary Wharf development scheme, the HIV/haemophiliac claims against the UK government and the Herald of Free Enterprise disaster. Most recently he has appeared in the 'designer baby' appeal in the House of Lords.

He was created Baron Brennan, of Bibury in the County of Gloucestershire on 2 May 2000 and is former President of the Catholic Union of Great Britain. In 2006 Lord Brennan was appointed Delegate for Great Britain and Ireland of the Sacred Military Constantinian Order of Saint George in succession to Anthony Bailey.

On 19 November 2007 Brennan collapsed in the House of Lords shortly after concluding a speech on the Human Fertilisation and Embryology Bill. He was given a heart massage in the House of Lords by, among others, Ara Darzi, Baron Darzi of Denham, the health minister. He had urged the creation of a National Bioethics Commission. Lord Brennan spent time recovering at St Thomas' Hospital, London.

On 3 December 2007, Lord Brennan again became unwell in the Chamber of the House of Lords. Having been fitted with a pacemaker at St Thomas' Hospital, he was thanking peers and staff who had been involved in the occasion when he was last taken ill when he fell back in his seat.

== Personal life ==
In 1968 he married a Spanish national, Pilar Sánchez Moya, with whom he has four sons.

== Affiliations ==
Lord Brennan is the chairman of the board of directors of the Washington-based think-tank Global Financial Integrity.

== Arms ==
Coat of arms of Daniel Brennan, Baron Brennan
Adopted 2007 Coronet Coronet of a Baron Crest A male griffin sejant Sable beaked rayed and forelegged Or holding in the beak a rose Gules seeded slipped and leaved Or. Escutcheon Or two pallets Gules over all a cross moline Sable between four harps sound boxes inwards those in base reversed Or. Supporters On either side a male griffin segreant Sable beaked rayed and forelegged Or and holding in the beak a rose Gules seeded slipped and leaved Or. Motto Si Deus Nobiscum Quis Contra Nos Badge Four pairs of harps Or the soundbox and pedal box of each conjoined Sable the whole in cross and conjoined in the centre point Symbolism Geographical emblems are found with the Irish harp, the red and gold pallets for Aragon and the red roses for Lancashire. The cross is used as a Christian emblem and the griffins relate to the name of the building in which the grantee has his chambers. The Badge combines both the Irish harp and a cross formation.

Orders of precedence in the United Kingdom
Preceded by The Lord Oakeshott of Seagrove Bay	Gentlemen; Baron Brennan	Followed by The Lord Layard
