= Sheila Lawlor, Baroness Lawlor =

British politician

The Right Honourable The Baroness Lawlor
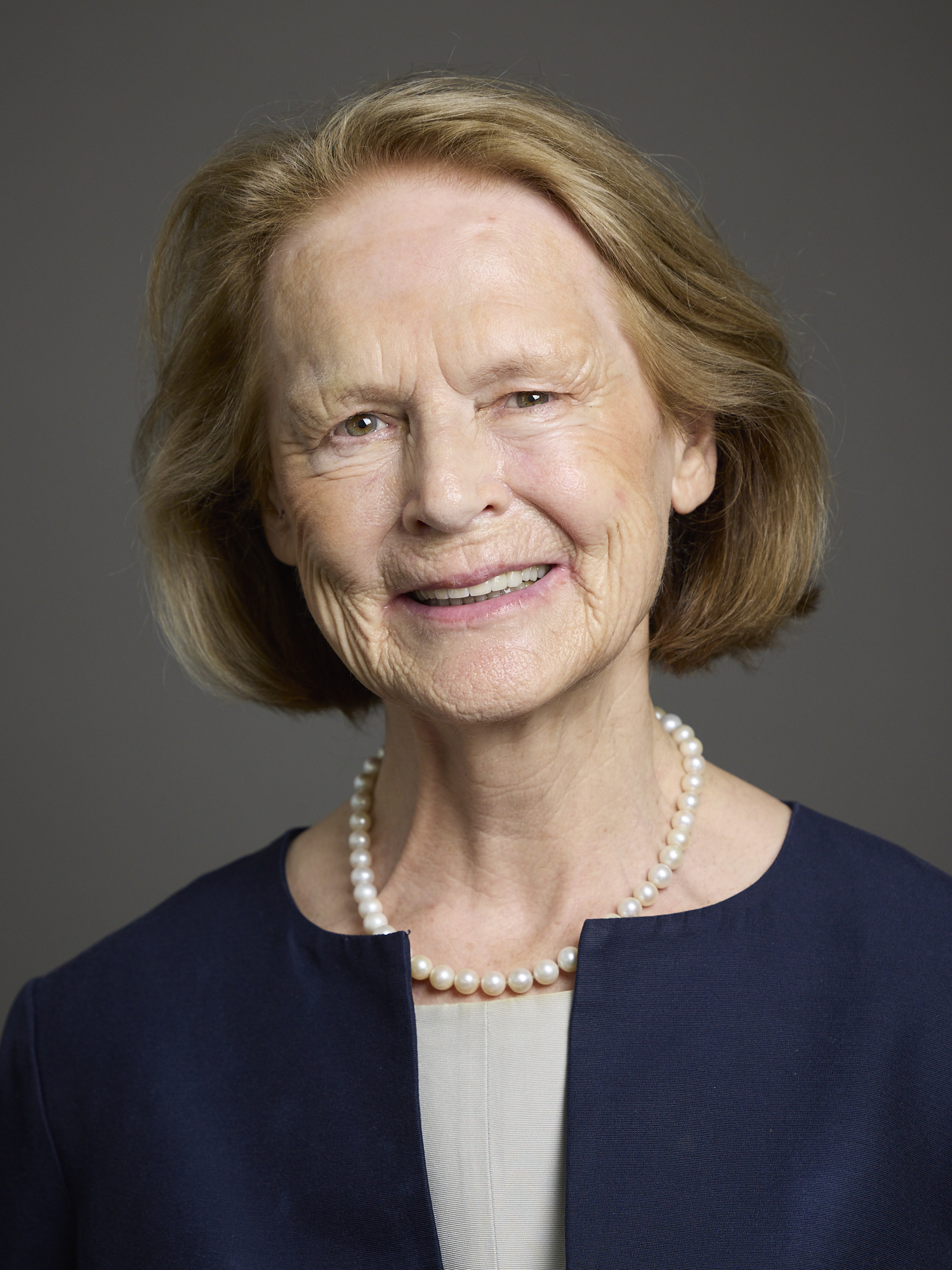
- Official portrait, 2026

Member of the House of Lords
- Lord Temporal
- Life peerage 3 November 2022

Personal details
- Born: 17 August 1953 (age 73)

Sheila Lawlor, Baroness Lawlor (born October 17, 1953) is the founder and director of research at Politeia, a British political think tank.

She was previously a research fellow at Sidney Sussex College and Churchill College, University of Cambridge.

It was announced on 14 October 2022, as part of Boris Johnson's 2022 Special Honours, Lawlor would be appointed a life peer. On 3 November 2022, she was created Baroness Lawlor, of Midsummer Common in the City of Cambridge and was introduced on 28 November 2022.

She is married to John Marenbon.
