= Politeia (think tank) =

UK think tank

- Formation: 1995
- Type: Private Company Limited by Guarantee. Registered in England in Wales No. 03123505
- Location: London, United Kingdom
- Board of directors: Dr Sheila Lawlor, Sir Brian Williamson, Professor Harold James
- Website: www.politeia.co.uk

Politeia is a market-oriented, non-party political British think tank. Its Founder and Research Director, Sheila Lawlor, and Politeia 'have been and remain hugely influential in steering public policy debate gently in a right of centre direction'.

Politeia's aim is to encourage reflection, discussion and debate about the role of the state in the daily lives of individuals across the range of issues which affect them, including education, employment, trade, tax, health and pensions.

== Areas of Work ==
- The Economy - Tax, regulation, public spending: What policy for a flourishing economy?
- Trade: The future basis for EU and global trade.
- The Constitution - Balancing the U.K.'s constitutional powers to protect liberty. The U.K.'s constitutional relations with the EU.
- Education and healthcare - Competing with the highest performing systems internationally.
- Welfare reform - Enabling people to move from dependency to independence.
- The legal system and home affairs - Accommodating a digital age.

== Academic Advisory Council ==
Members of Politeia's Academic Advisory Council include Professor Tim Congdon, Professor David Collins, Professor Vito Tanzi, Lord Field of Birkenhead and Lord Lexden.
