= All-Party Parliamentary Group for Legal and Constitutional Affairs =

United Kingdom liaison group

The All Party Parliamentary Group for Legal and Constitutional Affairs is an all-party parliamentary group of MPs and Peers within the Parliament of the United Kingdom that aims to "facilitate greater interaction between Parliament and the different branches of the legal profession, and to promote dialogue and understanding of legal and constitutional issues relating to justice and the legal services sector".

The APPG is co-chaired by David Hunt, Baron Hunt of Wirral, a Conservative life peer and solicitor and former Senior Partner at DAC Beachcroft, and by Linsey Farnsworth MP, a Labour MP. Previous Chairs have included: Catherine Atkinson MP, Nick Thomas-Symonds MP and the former Prime Minister Sir Keir Starmer MP.

The current Officers are Sarah Russel MP and Sarah Bool MP.

The APPG is jointly supported by The Law Society and the General Council of the Bar.
