= Denis Kinane =

Scottish immunologist (b.1957)

Denis Francis Kinane
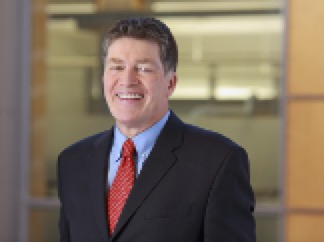
- Born: January 29, 1957 (age 69)
- Education: University of Edinburgh
- Occupations: Immunologist, Cell Biologist, Infection, Immunity and Genomics Specialist

Denis Francis Kinane (born 29 January 1957) is a Scottish immunologist, cell biologist, infection, immunity and genomics specialist. He is the author of more than 250 papers with an H-index of 82, and editor of Nature and Springer journals. Kinane has held professorial appointments in pathology, periodontology, immunology, infection and immunity at medical and dental schools in the UK, United States and Switzerland. He is a director of two large US and Chinese health companies and Scientific Director, CMO and founder of several smaller international companies.

Kinane is a Co-Founder and Chief Medical Officer at Cignpost Diagnostics Ltd, a UK based COVID-19 testing company specialising in rapid delivery of Gold standard PCR testing.

== Early life ==
Kinane was born in 1957 and spent his first 26 years living in Edinburgh. The son of a farmer, Jeremiah, and mother Anne, he has five sisters and two brothers, all of whom became teachers. He attended Holy Cross Academy, Edinburgh. He then went on to obtain a Bachelor Dental Surgery (BDS) from the University of Edinburgh in 1980. He then obtained a PhD from Edinburgh Medical School in 1983.

== Career ==
1980 - 1983 Research Fellow, Medical Immunology, University of Edinburgh Medical School.
1983 - 1987 Assistant Professor, Dundee University Dental Hospital and School
1994 Professor in Oral Immunology
1995 Director, Immunology Research Group
2000 Associate Dean for Research and Enterprise, University of Glasgow
1988 - 2002 Chair of Periodontology, University of Glasgow
2002 - 2009 University of Louisville

- Centre Director Oral And Systemic Disease
- Endowed Professor, Dept. Periodontology
- Professor, Dept. Immunology. University of Louisville

2009 - 2017 University of Pennsylvania

- Dean of School of Dental Medicine.
- Professor of Otorhinolaryngology at Penn School of Medicine.
- Professor of Pathology
- Professor of Clinical Periodontology

2018 - 2020 Professor Invite University of Geneva Dental School.
2020 - Date Professor Adjunct University of Bern Dental School, Switzerland.
2020 - Date Founder and Chief Medical Officer Cignpost Diagnostics Ltd.

== During the COVID-19 pandemic ==
After working with charity Project Little Boat, which was set up in March 2020, sourcing PPE and other essential equipment. Kinane co-founded Cignpost Diagnostics with Nick Markham and Steve Whatley and is the Chief Medical Officer. Cignpost has worked with elite sports, film production, travel and banking sectors to ensure they have a safe COVID-19-free working environment and under the consumer brand ExpressTest, to help the public travel safely. Kinane has advised on the medical processes to set up a global network of laboratories. He set up the Cignpost Diagnostics Institute which is bringing together the best minds within virology to analyse positive Covid cases. Using viral load, they differentiate between recently acquired cases of Covid and historic cases to provide a more accurate diagnosis. Key members include Lawrence S. Young from the University of Warwick and Erle Robertson from the University of Pennsylvania.

== Awards and honours ==
- Basic Science Award of the International Association for Dental Research, Brazil 2012.
- Visiting Professor of the Japan Society for the Promotion of Science 1996.
- European Oral Science - Research Award 1994
- Sir Wilfred Fish Research Prize, British Society of Periodontology, October 1987

== Personal life ==
Kinane is married with three children.
