= Laurence Young =

Laurence Young may refer to:

- Laurence Chisholm Young (1905–2000), American mathematician
- Laurence R. Young, American physicist
- Lawrence S. Young, British molecular oncologist
