= Andy Burnham as Leader of the Labour Party =

Leader of the Labour Party since 2026

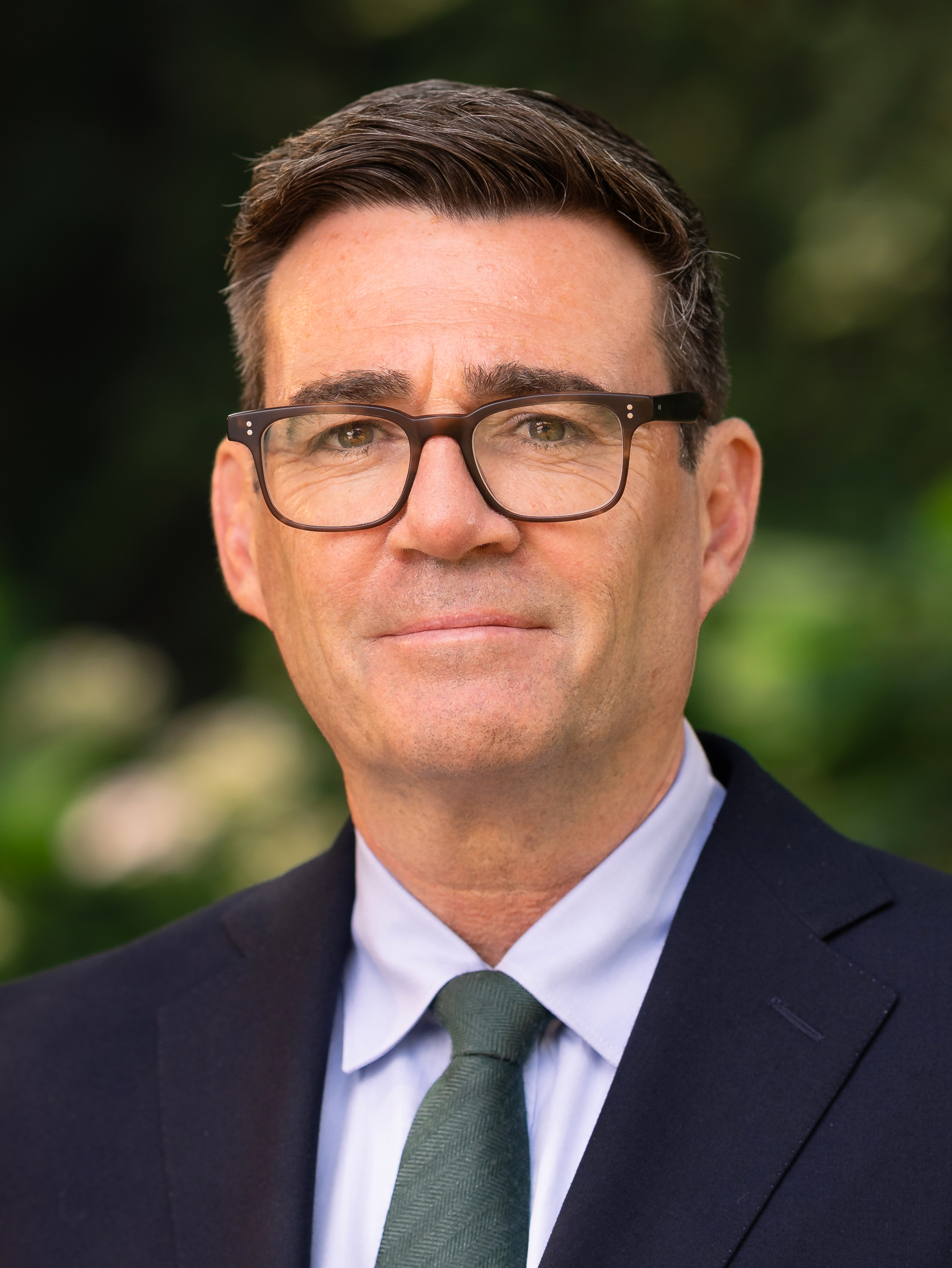
- Official portrait, 2026
- Andy Burnham as Leader of the Labour Party; 17 July 2026 – present
- Deputy: Lucy Powell
- Cabinet: Burnham ministry
- Party: Labour and Co-operative
- Election: Leadership; 2026
- Appointed by: Charles III (Note: Only as prime minister)

Andy Burnham was elected as Leader of the Labour Party and Prime Minister in July 2026, following Keir Starmer's resignation after a loss of confidence in his leadership among Labour MPs.

== Term ==
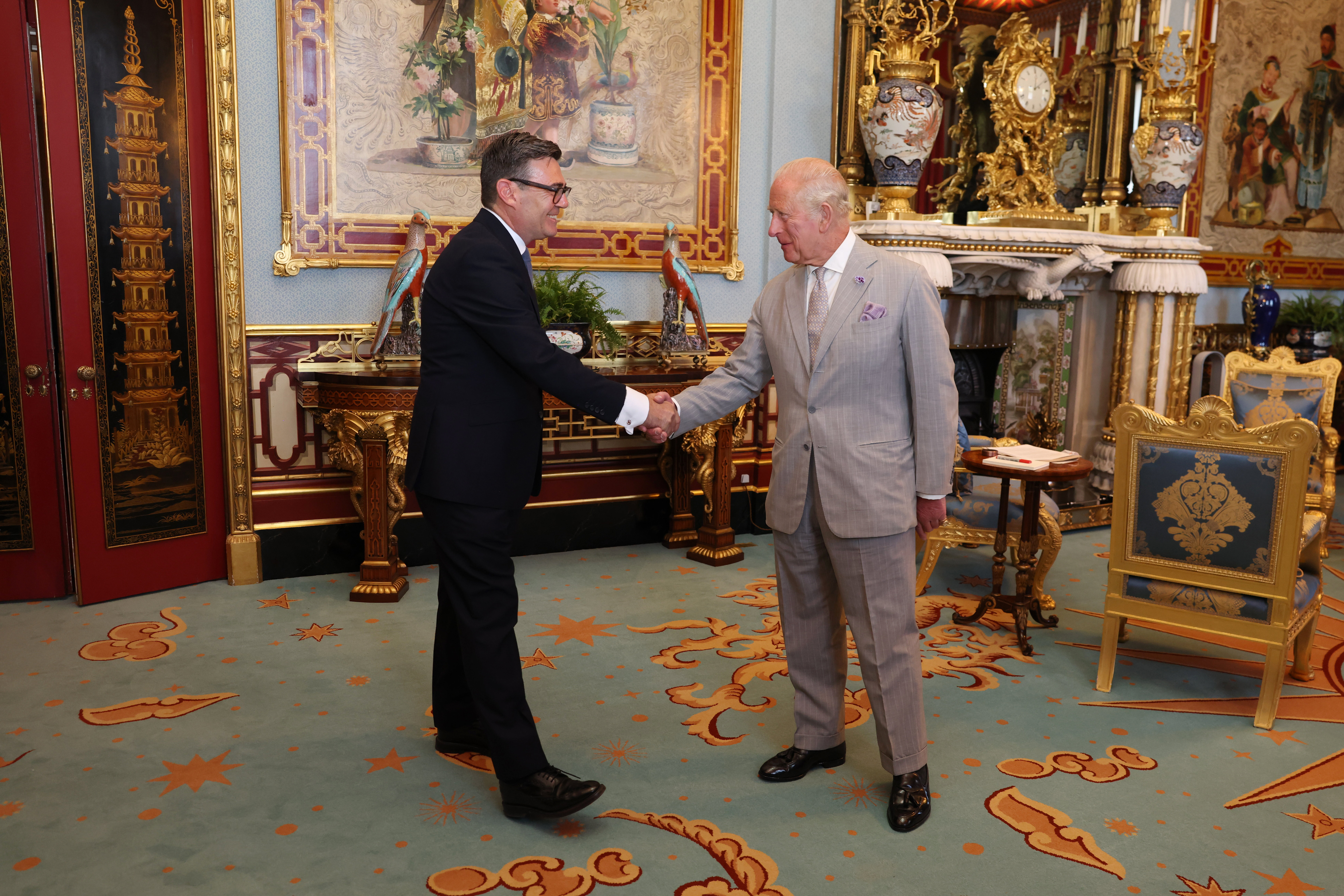
Burnham being received by Charles III at Buckingham Palace to be invited to form a government, in 2026

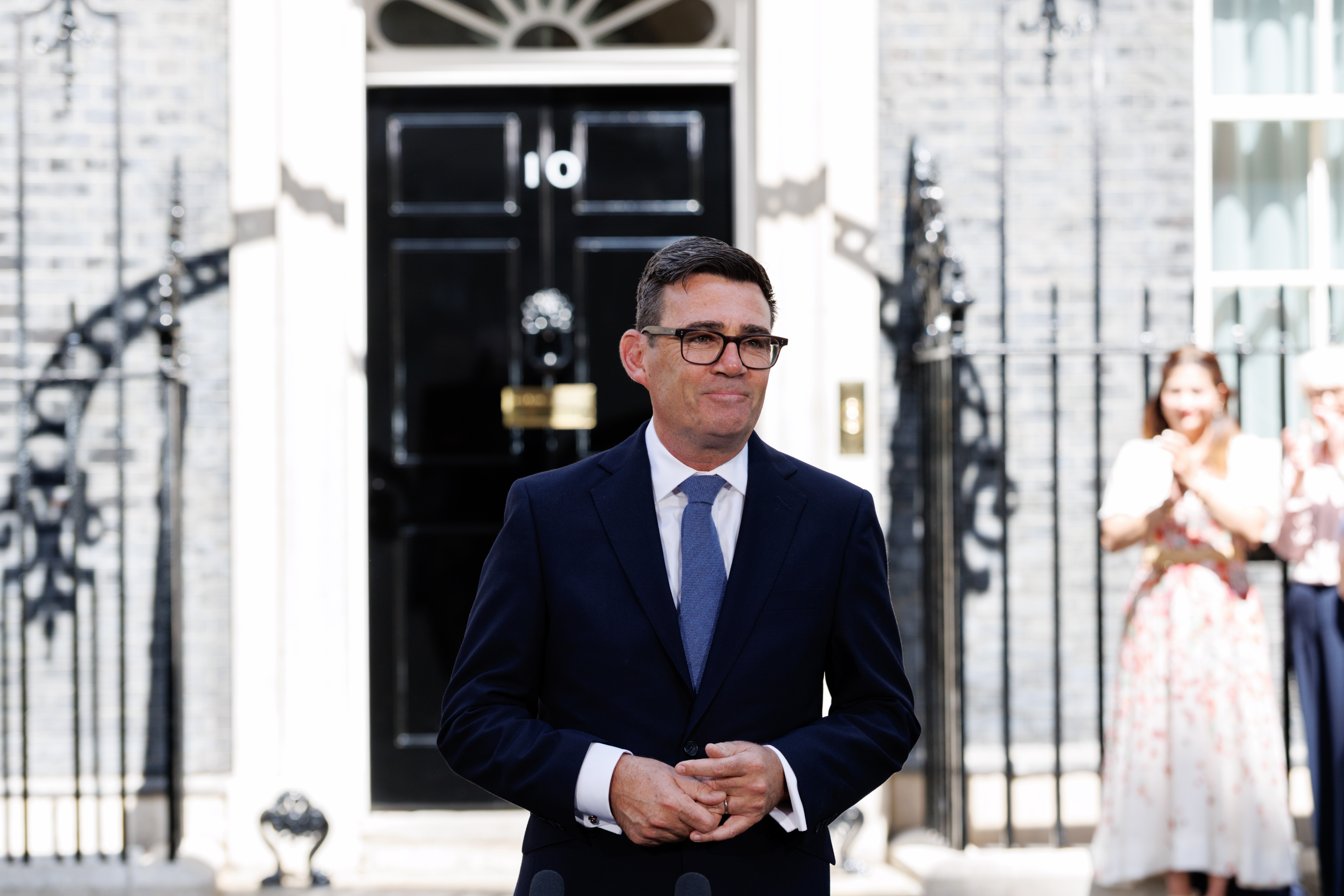
Burnham giving his first speech as Prime Minister

Andy Burnham, who had served as the mayor of Greater Manchester from 2017 to 2026 and previously ran for the Labour leadership in 2010 and 2015, had been tipped since 2025 as a potential leadership challenger to Starmer, but Labour rules dictate that only MPs can stand for the leadership. Burnham won the 2026 Makerfield by-election on 18 June after the constituency's MP, Josh Simons, resigned to allow Burnham to stand. Burnham's by-election victory intensified discussion of a leadership challenge; Starmer announced his resignation four days after the by-election, on the same day that Burnham was sworn in as an MP. Nominations from MPs opened on 9 July and closed on 15 July. Burnham received 379 nominations and was the only eligible candidate, as he was nominated by over 80% of all Labour MPs.

At a final total of 94%, Burnham received the highest amount of MP nominations ever recorded in a modern Labour leadership contest, exceeding Gordon Brown who received 88% of nominations in 2007. He became the Leader of the Labour Party on 17 July 2026, and assumed the role of Prime Minister three days later, on 20 July 2026. Upon taking office, Burnham became the first prime minister to belong to the Co-operative Party. At the end of July 2026, Bev Craig won the 2026 Greater Manchester mayoral by-election.

Following Burnham's appointment as Prime Minister on 20 July 2026, he began to form his cabinet, which first met on 21 July. He completed his ministerial appointments on 23 July. The initial appointments resulted in major cabinet changes, featuring a significant removal of close Starmer allies, while returning and rewarding those contributing to his downfall. Key departures from the previous ministry included Rachel Reeves, who was removed as Chancellor of the Exchequer after reportedly turning down an alternative role, David Lammy, who was dismissed as Deputy Prime Minister and Justice Secretary, Business Secretary Peter Kyle, Housing Secretary Steve Reed, Attorney General Lord Hermer, Chief Secretary to the Prime Minister, Chancellor of the Duchy of Lancaster and Minister for Intergovernmental Affairs Darren Jones, and Science, Innovation and Technology Secretary Liz Kendall, whose department was dissolved. 15 were dismissed from the cabinet, the most in a transition within the same party since Boris Johnson's first cabinet.

Following the major dismissals, Burnham began selecting the senior members of his government, making many high-profile appointments and retentions. John Healey made a surprise return to government as Chancellor of the Exchequer, while Ed Miliband was elevated to Foreign Secretary, a major step up from his former Energy and Net Zero brief. Close ally Louise Haigh was appointed First Secretary of State, Chancellor of the Duchy of Lancaster, and Minister for the Cabinet Office (his de facto Deputy Prime Minister). Angela Rayner returned to government in her previous post of Housing Secretary, Yvette Cooper was reshuffled to become Health Secretary and Wes Streeting re-joined the cabinet with his appointment as Defence Secretary. Rounding out the senior team, Jonathan Reynolds was promoted to the newly expanded brief of Business, Science, Innovation and Trade Secretary, while Labour Deputy Leader Lucy Powell became Education Secretary, Emma Reynolds returned to the Treasury, being appointed as Chief Secretary to the Treasury. Some notable retentions from Starmer's cabinet included Shabana Mahmood as Home Secretary, Pat McFadden as Work and Pensions Secretary, Alan Campbell as Leader of the Commons, Lisa Nandy as Culture Secretary and Heidi Alexander as Transport Secretary.

Burnham's cabinet is the first in history with a majority of female members: 12 of the 23 members of the cabinet are women and 11 (including the prime minister) are men. There are also two female ministers and three male ministers attending cabinet, making a total of 14 male and 14 female ministers at cabinet meetings.
