= Richard Hermer, Baron Hermer =

British barrister and life peer (born 1968)

The Right Honourable The Lord Hermer PC KC
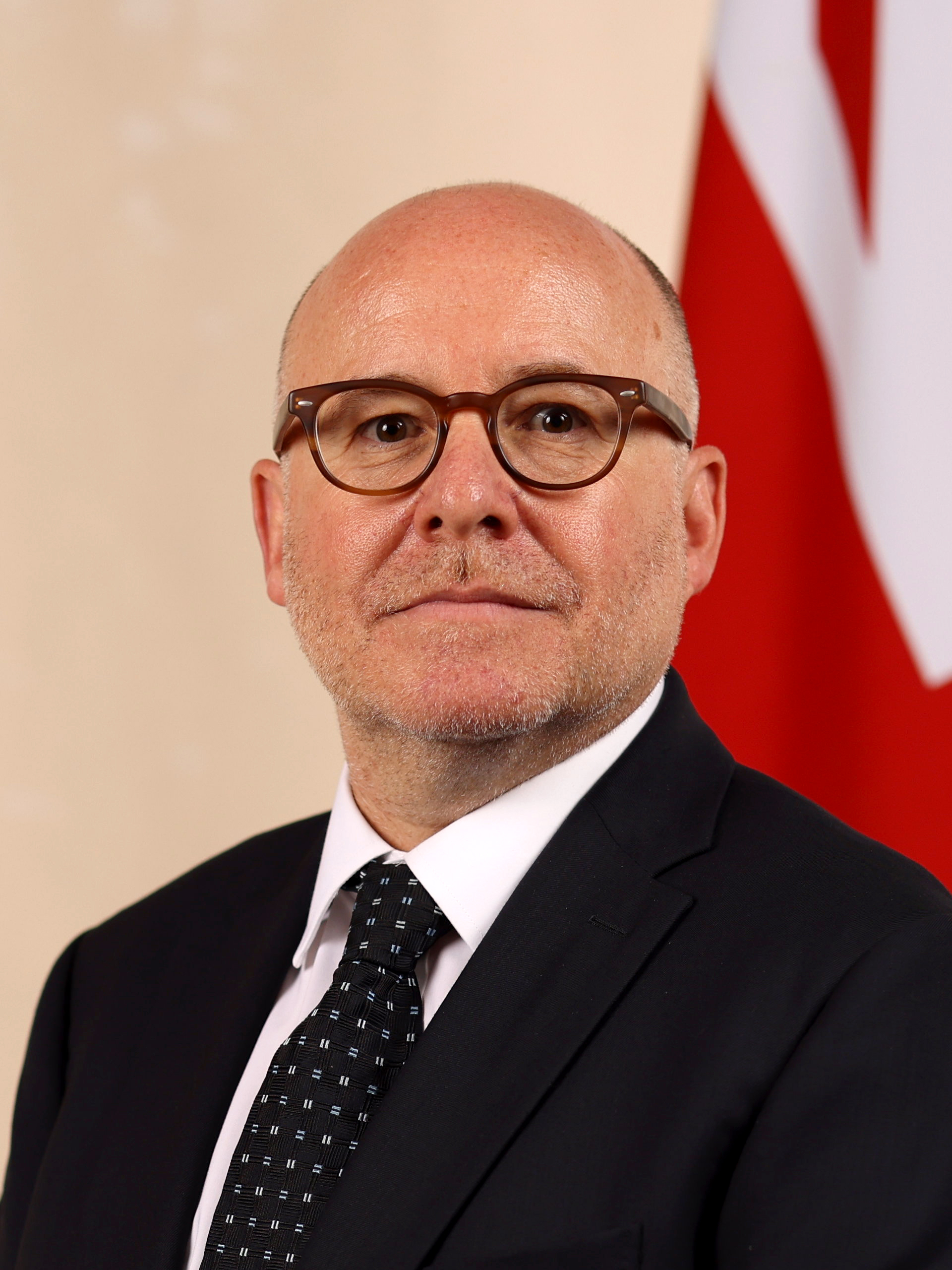
- Official portrait, 2024

Attorney General for England and Wales Advocate General for Northern Ireland
- In office 5 July 2024 – 20 July 2026
- Prime Minister: Keir Starmer
- Solicitor General: Sarah Sackman; Lucy Rigby; Ellie Reeves
- Preceded by: Victoria Prentis
- Succeeded by: Ellie Reeves

Member of the House of Lords
- Lord Temporal
- Life peerage 22 July 2024

Personal details
- Born: Richard Simon Hermer; 1968 (age 57–58) South Glamorgan, Wales
- Party: Labour
- Children: 2
- Relatives: Jonathan Shalit (cousin)
- Education: University of Manchester (BA)
- Website: gov.uk/government/people/richard-hermer

Richard Simon Hermer, Baron Hermer (born 1968) is a British barrister and life peer who served as Attorney General for England and Wales and Advocate General for Northern Ireland from 2024 to 2026.

Born in South Glamorgan, Hermer attended Cardiff High School. He went on to study politics and modern history at the University of Manchester and later pursued a legal career, being called to the bar in 1993. He joined Doughty Street Chambers in the same year and took silk in 2009, before leaving in 2012 to join Matrix Chambers. He later became the Chair of Matrix's Management Committee, and was appointed a deputy High Court judge in 2019. He has worked on numerous Supreme Court cases, including Lungowe v Vedanta Resources plc and Okpabi v Royal Dutch Shell plc. He argued that Shamima Begum should have been allowed to return to the United Kingdom to participate in her appeal when he intervened for Liberty in Begum v Home Secretary, and also represented the mother of one of the "ISIS Beatles". He represented former Guantánamo Bay detainee Abu Zubaydah in Zubaydah's Supreme Court case against the Foreign, Commonwealth and Development Office (FCDO), and argued against the deportation of al-Qaeda operative Abid Naseer. Hermer also acted for convicted terrorist Rangzieb Ahmed, and Saudi Arabian terrorist Mustafa al-Hawsawi. He was also involved in multiple cases related to the war on terror, including representing victims in the Afghan unlawful killings inquiry, and the inquest into Corporal Stephen Allbutt's death in the Iraq War.

Hermer also worked on cases relating to police misconduct, including cases concerning the shooting of James Ashley and the killing of Mark Duggan. He acted for over 900 victims of the Grenfell tower fire which led to the settlement in May 2023. He represented the family of Adam Rickwood, who was the youngest person to die in custody in the modern era, in an inquest into Rickwood's death. He also represented the family of Ella Kissi-Debrah, who was later found to have died of air pollution. He also unsuccessfully challenged the Supreme Court over the assessment of the age of asylum seekers, as well as unsuccessfully taking the UK government to court on behalf of Sri Lankan asylum seekers coming from the Chagos Islands. In 2022, he was appointed to the Task Force on Accountability for Crimes Committed in Ukraine following the Russian invasion of Ukraine, and in 2023 he acted as an adviser to the Labour Party regarding the Economic Activity of Public Bodies (Overseas Matters) Bill. In 2023, he represented former Sinn Féin President Gerry Adams following damage claims brought against Adams. Hermer has also advised Caribbean nations on slavery reparations, and represented Kenyan victims of torture during the Mau Mau emergency.

A friend and former colleague of Keir Starmer at Doughty Street Chambers, Hermer was a donor to Starmer's campaign in the 2020 Labour leadership election. After Starmer became Prime Minister following the 2024 general election, he appointed Hermer to the government as Attorney General for England and Wales and Advocate General for Northern Ireland. He is the first person to have not served in either the House of Commons or House of Lords before becoming Attorney General in over a century. (Note: Since Douglas Hogg was appointed to the position in 1922.) Hermer was concurrently nominated for a life peerage, and soon afterward was appointed to the Privy Council. During his tenure, the government removed its opposition to the International Criminal Court's arrest warrant for Benjamin Netanyahu and Yoav Gallant, oversaw the prosecution of individuals who were involved in the 2024 riots, and agreed to cede sovereignty of the Chagos islands to Mauritius. Hermer has strengthened official guidance on legal risk, and rejected calls to review the sentence of Southport murderer Axel Rudakubana. He has faced criticism in the position for his alleged intervention over the security of singer Taylor Swift during The Eras Tour, as well as controversy over alleged conflicts of interests from his past legal career, whilst serving as Attorney General. He left the government after the appointment of Andy Burnham as prime minister.

== Early life, family and education ==
Richard Simon Hermer was born in South Glamorgan in 1968 to a "blue-box" Jewish family. His father, whom Hermer has described as a "proud" Conservative and a "one-nation tory", was a solicitor, city councillor in Cardiff and county councillor in South Glamorgan. His mother was politically more to "the left", and his father was also one of the youngest to qualify through the five-year route. Hermer worked in his father's office during holidays, where he delivered letters and covered the switchboard. He has said that he disagreed with his father "across a wide array of political topics", but said that they never fell out over politics.

Hermer was raised in Cardiff and attended his local comprehensive primary school, Cardiff High School. He spent his final A-level year at a sixth form college. His favourite subjects were English, history and drama, and he aspired to become a theatre director and writer at the time. He later studied politics and modern history at the University of Manchester. Whilst at the university of Manchester, Hermer was chair of the students' union and a national executive member of the National Union of Students. In his youth, he was a volunteer for the magazine Searchlight; which later described him as an "active and dedicated" anti-fascist who worked closely with the magazine while he was a student in Manchester. He is a former sabbatical officer of the Union of Jewish Students.

== Legal career (1993–2024) ==
=== Career ===
Hermer was called to the bar at the Middle Temple in October 1993. He started his career in Cardiff, but later moved to London to pursue what he later called the "really interesting" human rights work. He subsequently joined Doughty Street Chambers and there he got to know founding member Keir Starmer. Hermer acted as a junior to Starmer on numerous cases, and Starmer later gave the toast at Hermer's silk ceremony in 2009. On 13 March 2012, Hermer left Doughty Street Chambers and moved to work at Matrix Chambers. He later became the Chair of Matrix's Management committee, and was also colleague of Sarah Sackman whilst working there. During his career, Hermer specialised in human rights law, public law and environmental law, with The Guardian later describing him as an "expert on international law". His practice spanned public international law and private international law as well as domestic public law and private law.

In 2000, Hermer was appointed the inaugural Human Rights Practitioner in Residence at Columbia University in New York. In November 2019, Hermer was appointed a deputy High Court judge following an open competition by the Judicial Appointments Commission.

=== Selected cases ===
==== Derek Bentley estate ====
Hermer acted for the estate of Derek Bentley, a British man who was hanged for the murder of a policeman in 1953 but was later posthumously pardoned.

==== Ashley v Chief Constable of Sussex ====
In 2005, Hermer along with Keir Starmer were instructed by Deighton Guedalla for the claimants in Ashley v Chief Constable of Sussex, regarding the shooting of James Ashley.

In 2008, after the defendant supplied a copy of the Moonstone Report to the advisers of the claimants, but the scope of the redactions were disputed; Hermer argued that anything to the discredit of the defendant should have been disclosed because it could have potentially aggravated damages, but the judge rejected this.

==== Abid Naseer deportation ====
Hermer defended Pakistani student Abid Naseer, later found to be an al-Qaeda operative and who intended to carry out a bombing attack at a Manchester shopping centre, before the Special Immigration Appeals Commission (SIAC) as the Home Office applied to deport him based on him being a threat to national security.

MI5 revealed that they had emails between Naseer and an al-Qaeda operative in which they believed that references to a girl was actually an explosive device and references to a wedding was actually the date for a planned attack. Hermer argued that the case against Naseer was "palpably weak" and "inherently flawed", and called for the appellant to be given "his liberty". Hermer also said that the case was "pitiful" and "far-fetched".

Hermer failed to secure bail for Naseer during the 2009 hearing, and during a later judgement the SIAC found that Naseer was an al-Qaeda operative and that it was "conducive to public good" that he should be deported.

==== Kenyan Mau Mau torture victims ====
Hermer represented Kenyan victims of torture during the Mau Mau emergency in the 1950s in a case against the British government. He acted for four Kenyans who claimed they were tortured by colonial officials and soldiers, and Justice Richard McCombe ruled in July 2011 that they had the right to sue the British government for compensation.

Three of the victims launched a second attempt in July 2012 to sue the British government following the discovery of Foreign Office files that documented the torture and murder of detainees by colonial officials. The FCO's archive of thousands of colonial-era files contained over 15,000 contemporary pages of relevance to the case. The lawyers for the FCO argued that the claims should have been be struck out as too much time had passed since the 1950s, but Hermer argued that the existence of thousands of official records meant that a fair trial was still possible, as well as witnesses still potentially being alive. Hermer said that the case would "take a long time, cost a lot of money, and occupy court time", but argued it was a case where there was a "dearth of evidence" and instead that there was an "extraordinary amount of evidence".

Foreign Secretary William Hague announced around £20m of compensation for victims of the torture in June 2013.

==== Caribbean slavery reparations ====
Hermer advised Caribbean nations from CARICOM when they sought slavery reparations from Britain. The plans for the case were inspired by the 2013 case where Kenyan victims of torture from the Mau Mau emergency successfully sued the British government, which Hermer also worked on previously. CARICOM looked to Leigh Day for advice on how to bring a similar case, and Hermer acted as a counsel for the claimants after being engaged by Leigh Day. Hermer reportedly helped human rights lawyers to prepare the case, but the proposed legal case was never officially brought against Britain, although the legal advice reportedly helped to form CARICOM's 10-point plan for reparations in 2014.

==== Lungowe v Vedanta Resources plc ====
In 2017, Hermer was instructed by Leigh day for the respondents, in Lungowe & Ors v Vedanta Resources Plc & Anor, where he argued that the fact of the Vedanta claim in the UK "weighed very heavily" in favour of the conclusion that service out should have been set aside, though acknowledged the mere fact of it did not automatically lead to that conclusion. He later submitted that the judge had reached the right conclusion on whether England and Wales was the correct place to bring the claim, largely for the reasons that he gave.

In 2019, Hermer was instructed by Leigh day where he represented the claimants in the Supreme court case Lungowe v Vedanta Resources plc. He argued in the case that a lack of funding to support a fairly represented case presented a major barrier to justice in Zambia.

==== Killing of Mark Duggan ====
In 2020, Hermer, whilst working for Matrix Chambers, was a collaborator and part of the extended team working with Forensic Architecture, investigating the killing of Mark Duggan on 4 August 2011.

==== Mother of one of the "ISIS Beatles" ====
Hermer represented Maha Elgizouli, the mother of one of the "ISIS Beatles" El Shafee Elsheikh, in a case which blocked Britain from sharing intelligence with the US.

Elsheikh was part of the jihadist group dubbed the "ISIS Beatles", who carried out the beheadings of American journalists James Foley and Steven Sotloff, and British aid workers David Haines and Alan Henning. In January 2018, Elsheikh and another member of the group were captured by US-backed Syrian Democratic Forces (SDF), and a deal was later agreed by Home Secretary Sajid Javid and Donald Trump's administration in which the UK agreed to share intelligence to prosecute the two members in US courts. A leaked letter from Javid to the US Attorney General, Jeff Sessions, revealed that Javid consented to transfer the evidence of the crimes of the terrorists without assurances that they would not be given the death penalty if convicted in America.

The emergence of the deal prompted Elgizouli to appeal against sharing information with the US about her son, and Hermer represented her in the case. The first appeal was dismissed by the High Court, but in a landmark decision in March 2020 the Supreme Court ruled that sharing the intelligence without assurances that he would not face the death penalty would violate the Data Protection Act 2018, and the ruling later forced the UK to change its position.

==== Begum v Home Secretary ====
In 2020, Hermer acted for Liberty; a human rights group (which was an intervenor in Begum v Home Secretary) that argued that Shamima Begum should have been allowed to return to the UK to participate in her appeal. Home Secretary Sajid Javid decided to revoke Begum's citizenship in 2019, which led Begum appealing the decision but a unanimous decision by the Special Immigration Appeals Commission (SIAC) in February 2020 concluded that she had not been improperly deprived of her citizenship. The case was brought to the Court of Appeal in 2020, where Liberty argued that the deprivation of citizenship by the Home Secretary was an "extremely draconian power."

In written submissions in the Court of Appeal case, Hermer said that Begum was "no longer entitled to be protected by the state" which he said risked Begum to "exposure to irregular treatment" such as "rendition and targeted drone strikes"; going on to say that the consequences could be "fatal". Hermer told the court that there had been a "significant increase in the use of draconian powers" in recent years, and also said that there was a "further complexity" when the SIAC was required to "determine deprivation appeals involving individuals who were groomed whilst in the UK and recruited to join ISIS" which Hermer said included "young women, some of whom were groomed as children, who travelled to Syria to marry men who were aligned with ISIS." He also submitted that "once in ISIS territory, girls and women faced coercive and exploitative conditions" which Hermer described as a "complex issue" which he said could not be "effectively explored" unless the "potential victim" was "able to meaningfully participate by providing evidence in her appeal."

In July 2020, the Court of Appeal ruled that Begum should have been allowed to return to the UK to appeal the decision to remove her citizenship, but in March 2021, the Supreme Court overturned the Court of Appeal's decision and refused Begum leave to enter the UK to participate in her appeal.

==== Okpabi v Royal Dutch Shell plc ====
In June 2020, Hermer represented the claimants, who were Nigerian citizens who commenced two sets of proceedings against the Royal Dutch Shell Plc (RDS) and the Shell Petroleum Development Company of Nigeria Ltd (SPDC), in Supreme Court case Okpabi v Royal Dutch Shell plc. On 23 June, he told the court that there were "systematic failures either to stop devastating oil spills or remedy their profound impact", and also said that the damage to the mangrove fields covered 13,000 hectares which was more than twice the area of Manhattan.

In February 2021, in a landmark judgement the Supreme Court ruled unanimously in favour that the claims of the 50,000 Nigerian villagers against the Royal Dutch Shell must proceed to trial.

==== Rangzieb Ahmed compensation ====
Hermer acted for convicted terrorist Rangzieb Ahmed in 2020 in a High Court case where Ahmed sought compensation from and tried to sue the British government for alleged torture by Pakistan. The case focused around whether security services, the police and UK government departments should have had joint liability for the alleged actions of Pakistan, which was an allied country in the war on terror. Ahmed was previously convicted of a series of terror offences in 2008, but launched an appeal on the grounds that his conviction was unsafe in 2010 which was dismissed by the Court of Appeal.

In the 2020 case, Hermer argued that there was nothing in the 2020 case that could have cast doubt on the safety of the previous conviction, and also claimed that recent revelations of British complicity in the torture of terrorist subjects made it more likely that the claims of Ahmed were true. The court found the claims unconvincing, and dismissed claims against all of the defendants.

==== Asylum seeker age assessment ====
Hermer acted for an Eritrean man who entered the UK on his own and claimed asylum as a 16-year-old in 2014. The man was arrested as an illegal migrant as immigration officers deemed him to be an adult and treated him as such from the outset. British immigration staff thought the man was in his mid-20s and Italian authorities later reported that the man had told them that he was 26. Hermer contested the Home Office guidance on how age should be assessed. He said that it encouraged or permitted unlawful conduct because it did not sufficiently eliminate the risk that asylum officers may make a mistake when they assessed the age of an asylum seeker who claimed to be a child.

If no other evidence of age was available, Criterion C in the guidance asserted that their physical appearance very strong suggested that they are significantly over the age of 18 and no other credible evidence exists to the contrary. Hermer's client sought to quash that part of the guidance on the grounds that it could be unlawful if, when the guidance is followed, the risk that the asylum seeker could be assessed as an afilt but was still actually a child was not removed. The case was dismissed by the Upper Tribunal, but was appealed at the Court of Appeal. The Secretary of State furthered the case to the Supreme Court, and on 30 July 2021 the Supreme Court unanimously found that the guidance was lawful and Hermer lost the case.

==== Zubaydah v FCDO ====
Between 2021 and 2023, Hermer represented Abu Zubaydah, a Palestinian former Guantanamo Bay detainee, in his case filed against the Foreign, Commonwealth and Development Office (FCDO). Zubaydah alleged that between 2002 and 2006 he was unlawfully rendered by agents of the United States Central Intelligence Agency (CIA) in Afghanistan, Guantanamo Bay, Lithuania, Morocco, Poland and Thailand (the six countries), where he was arbitrarily detained and subjected to extreme mistreatment and torture. He had brought the claim in English courts, as he alleged that UK intelligence services were complicit in the mistreatment and torture. In 2021, the High Court held that Zubaydah's claims against the UK intelligence services were governed by the laws of the six countries, but in 2022 the Court of Appeal overturned the judgement and said that the claims were governed by English law.

The case was brought to the Supreme Court, which was heard on 14 and 15 June 2023, and Hermer was instructed by Bhatt Murphy Solicitors in the case. He urged to the court the point that the significance of the injuries that occurred in the six countries was reduced because Zubaydah was not voluntarily present in any of the six countries, as he was unlawfully taken and detained there by the CIA. He also argued that those six countries were chosen by the CIA because the local law could be evaded, and also said that the CIA "acting within their own law" and "operating their own framework of value and law". He also underlined how the CIA's black sites in each of the six countries acted as "de facto exclaves" where the laws and jurisdictions of the country did not run, and later described how the UK services opportunistically took advantage of the state of affairs that the CIA had brought about, which Hermer said made them complicit in that conduct. On 20 December 2023, the Supreme Court ruled in a majority 4-1 decision that English law was applicable.

==== Task-force for Ukraine ====
In March 2022, Hermer was appointed to a legal task-force, alongside other leading international human rights lawyers including Lord Neuberger, by the Government of Ukraine on the accountability for crimes committed in Ukraine to deliver for victims of international crimes committed by Russia in Ukraine.

==== Grenfell Tower fire ====
Hermer acted for over 900 victims of the Grenfell Tower disaster and led the negotiations which led to the settlement of around £150,000,000 in 2023. He outlined the detail of the settlement to judge, Barbara Fontaine, at a High Court hearing in London where he said that around £50,000,000 would be allocated to a "restorative justice project", and also said that the defendants had agreed to fund an event titled "testimony week". Hermer said that "no amount of money will ever truly compensate for what the claimants have had to endure", and said that the settlement is "purely of the civil claims for compensation", and went on to say that it "does not right the wrong" and "does not secure accountability".

==== Anti-BDS bill ====
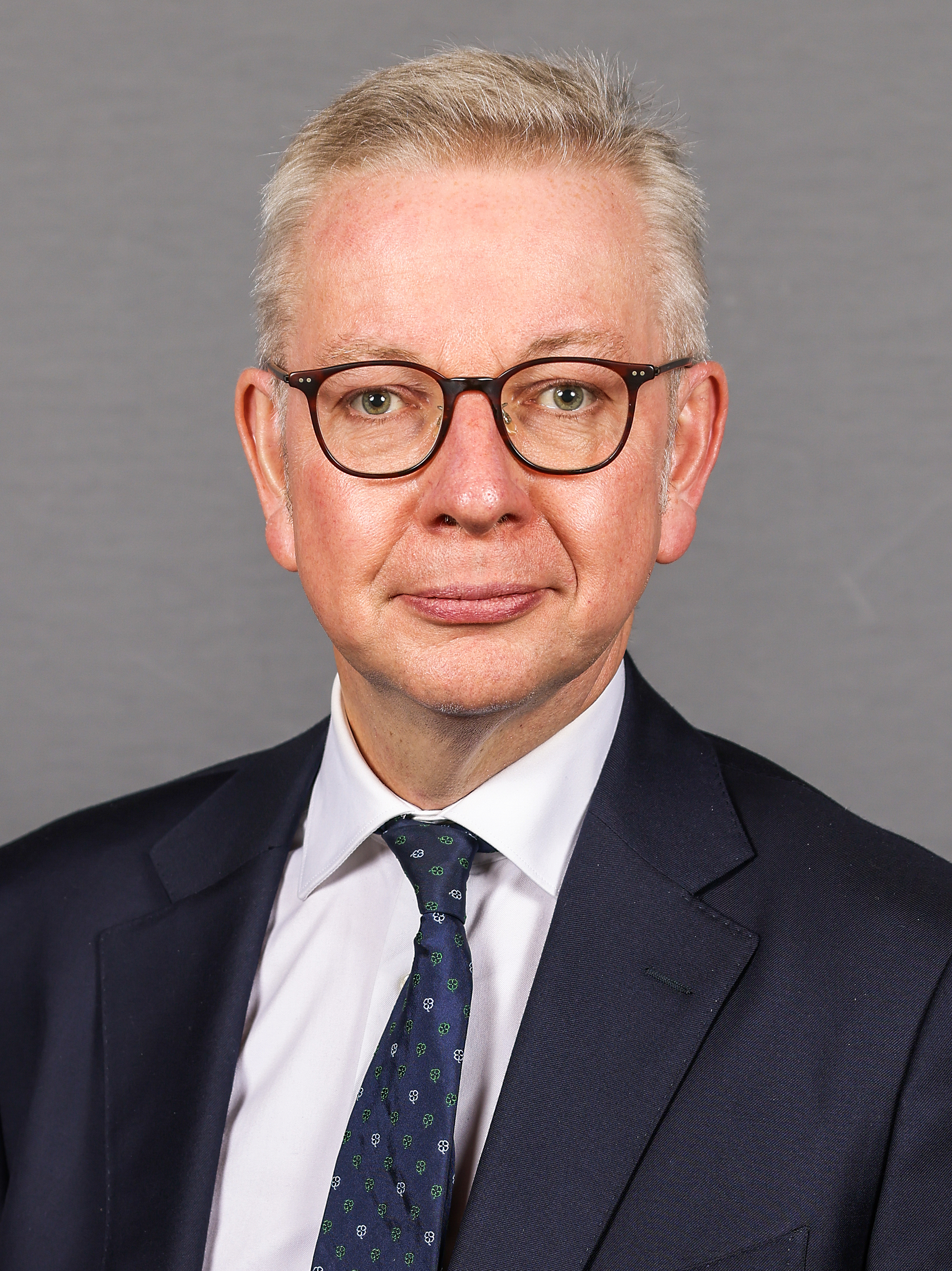
Communities Secretary Michael Gove (pictured) said that Hermer had a "record of political commitments" on the topic

In July 2023, he acted as an adviser to the Labour Party regarding the proposed Economic Activity of Public Bodies bill, which was known as the Anti-BDS bill. In his opinion which was commissioned by David Lammy and Lisa Nandy, Hermer described Clause 1 of the bill as "appallingly badly drafted" and said that the bill would "stifle free speech at home", and also said that it would have a "profoundly detrimental impact" on the ability of the UK to "protect and promote humans rights overseas." He also said that the bill "effectively equates the OPT with Israel itself" which he said meant it was "very difficult to reconcile with the long-standing position of the United Kingdom which supports a two-state solution." Hermer also said that handing such power to the Secretary of State would "seem at odds with the general tenor of government policy to decentralise power", and went on to say that history had shown the "capricious consequences" that flow when powers of that nature were "removed from hundreds of public bodies and placed exclusively in the hands of one decision maker."

Conservative MP Simon Clarke, whilst addressing Communities Secretary Michael Gove in the House of Commons, pointed out that Hermer had authored a chapter in the book titled Corporate Complicity in Israel's Occupation: Evidence from the London session of the Russell Tribunal on Palestine, which Clarke said was edited by some "interesting" people Clarke feared "in the most negative sense", and went on to ask if Hermer was really the "calibre of individual" who should have been advising the opposition. In response, Gove said that Hermer had a "record" in the area and a "record of political commitments" which everyone could see "clearly predisposes him towards a political and particular view" on the question. Hermer later responded by stating that the questions inferred that his analysis was somehow influenced by some form of malign intent towards Israel, but Hermer said that "it was not."

==== Gerry Adams damage claims ====
In November 2023, Hermer led the legal team and was the barrister for former Sinn Féin President, Gerry Adams, following damage claims of £1 brought against Adams and the Provisional Irish Republican Army (PIRA) by victims of bombings. In court, he argued that the PIRA was an "unincorporated association" that was "incapable in law of being sued." In a written case outline to Justice Michael Soole, he also argued against the claims of Adams as a "representative" of the PIRA, but did not argue that entire claims against Adams should be struck out.

In January 2024, Justice Soole ruled that the claimants could not sue the PIRA or Adams as a "representative", but could continue in a personal capacity.

The Times reported that Hermer, as the lead counsel for the case, received £24,000 for advice and to prepare court filings after the case was lodged in 2022, and a further £6,000 to appear at a hearing in November 2023.

==== Mustafa al-Hawsawi case ====
Hermer represented Saudi Arabian terrorist Mustafa al-Hawsawi, on behalf of the human rights charity Redress, in al-Hawsawi's case against the Ministry of Defence, MI5 and MI6. Al-Hawsawi alleged that British spies were complicit in his alleged torture from the CIA. In the claim to the Investigatory Powers Tribunal, Hermer tried to establish liability for the "conduct" of the UK agencies and their role in the "torture and ill-treatment" of al-Hawsawi.

The IPT ruled in May 2023 that it did have jurisdiction to investigate the complaint against the UK intelligence agencies.

==== Sri Lankan asylum seekers ====
In 2023, Hermer unsuccessfully took the UK government to court on behalf of Sri Lankan asylum seekers who tried to get to Britain from the Chagos Islands. The asylum seekers, who were of Tamil heritage, fled their country on fishing boats due to fear of persecution. The asylum seekers said that they had previously hoped to find sanctuary in Canada, but were left stranded in the waters around the British Indian Ocean territory before they tried to seek refuge in Britain.

In his 2023 legal challenge, Hermer argued that the five asylum seekers that he was representing had endured poor treatment from British authorities in the Chagos islands and that their mental health had deteriorated, which he argued amounted to detention. The five asylum seekers were part of a group of dozens who washed up at the Diego Garcia base, and hoped to come to Britain, but the action was dismissed by the High Court.

==== Soldier murdered by IRA ====
In 2024, Hermer was instructed by the family of a British soldier who was murdered by the IRA in 1991, which was a challenge to the Northern Ireland (Legacy and Reconciliation) Act 2003.

=== Selected inquests ===
==== Adam Rickwood inquest ====
In May 2007, Hermer represented the family of Adam Rickwood, who was the youngest person to die in custody in the modern era. The Youth Justice Board decided to send Rickwood to Hassockfield Secure Training Centre rather than one of the five local security authority children's homes (Lasch), and during the inquiry Hermer told the jury that the Laschs had a "different emphasis" compared to the STCs, due to better trained staff and higher staff ratios.

In December 2008, following calls from Rickwood's mother for a second inquest, Hermer said that Rickwood had died due to "systemic failures" and the use of an "unlawful" restraint technique. On 17 December when he opened the case, Hermer said that Rickwood was a "deeply troubled and deeply vulnerable child", and went on to say that the inquest considered the restraint methods used on Rickwood as a pontetial contributory factor to his death.

==== Stephen Allbutt inquest ====
In June 2007, Hermer acted in an inquest for the families of Corporal Stephen Allbutt and Trooper David Clarke; Clarke and Allbutt were two soldiers who were killed in Iraq in a "friendly fire" incident in March 2003. The inquest, which was held in Oxford, was into Allbutt's death as no inquest could be held for Clarke as his body was not found. Hermer told the inquest that documents were not given to the families of the two men when they should have been, and said that their copies had been edited to the point where they were "almost unintelligible". He went onto say that all it had done was "cause hurt and upset" to Allbutt's widow.

Lieutenant Colonel Lindsay MacDuff, who was a Major at the time, insisted in evidence to the inquest that he told Allbutt over the radio about the two friendly tanks (which had killed Allbutt and Clarke), despite there being no record of this transmission. In response, Hermer said to MacDuff "you are lying" and went on to say that it was "not a recollection" but instead a "fabrication."

==== Ella Kissi-Debrah inquest ====
In November and December 2020, Hermer represented the family of Ella Kissi-Debrah in an inquest. He accused Lewisham council of failing to treat air pollution as a priority despite knowing that it was dangerous. He said that after studies indicated that the pollution level was soaring, the council took seven years to make the first strategic needs assessment; going on to describe it as a "glacial pace in the context of a public health emergency." Hermer was instructed by Hodge Jones and Allen in the case, and the inquest later found that Ella-Kissi Debrah had died of air pollution.

In July 2024, after Rosamund Kissi-Debrah announced that she would be suing the government, Rosamund Kissi-Debrah said that Hermer had "equated Ella's suffering to torture."

==== Afghan Unlawful Killings inquiry ====
In a public inquiry into the killing of 80 civilians by the SAS in Afghanistan, Hermer represented Mansour Aziz and families of the 33 victims. On 9 October 2023, in his opening statement on behalf of the families, he said that he would seek to find evidence "capable of suggesting" that the SAS were "applying a practice of unlawfully killing Afghan civilians"; later saying that this meant they were "conducting a campaign of murder" which he said was a "war crime amounting to grave breaches of the Geneva convention." He also stated on 11 October that the existence of serious suspicions of extrajudicial killings were "widely known at the highest levels of government … even in 10 downing street." Following evidence that the SAS deleted data from its computers which was in breach of promises it had made to the Royal Military Police, Hermer said that it was at best "highly suspicious", and at worst a "patent and criminal attempt to pervert the course of justice."

== Political involvement (before 2024) ==
Hermer has been a supporter of the Labour Party since he was a teenager. He has said his interest in politics goes back to when he was a pre-teen, due to his support of the anti-apartheid movement. He has previously been involved with the Labour Campaign for Human Rights (LCHR), and was involved with a fringe event with the LCHR at the Labour party conference.

On 30 December 2019, Hermer donated £5,000 to Keir Starmer's successful campaign in the 2020 Labour Party Leadership election.

== Attorney General (2024–2026) ==
=== Appointment and peerage ===
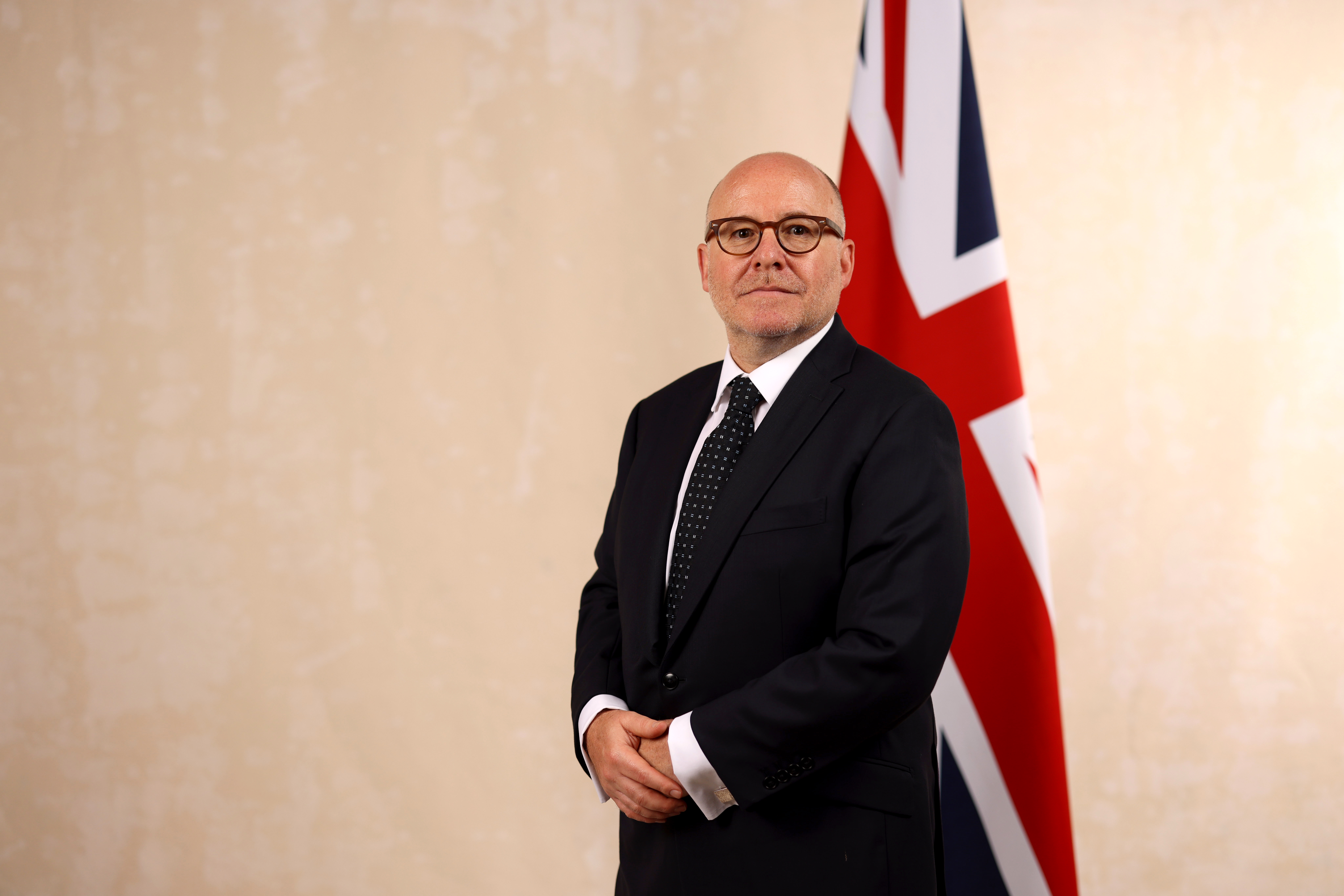
Hermer's official cabinet portrait, 5 July 2024

On 5 July 2024, after Keir Starmer became Prime Minister of the United Kingdom following the 2024 general election, Hermer was appointed Attorney General for England and Wales and Advocate General for Northern Ireland, succeeding Victoria Prentis. His appointment to the position was widely reported as a surprise, (Note: Sources describing Hermer's appointment as a surprise:) since Labour MP Emily Thornberry had served in Starmer's shadow cabinet as the Shadow Attorney General. In response to the decision, Thornberry said that Hermer was a "much more accomplished lawyer" than she could ever hope to be and that she knew Hermer would do an "outstanding job" in the position. Hermer became the first attorney general since 1922 to not have served in parliament before his appointment. He is one of two members of Starmer's cabinet from Jewish backgrounds, along with Ed Miliband.

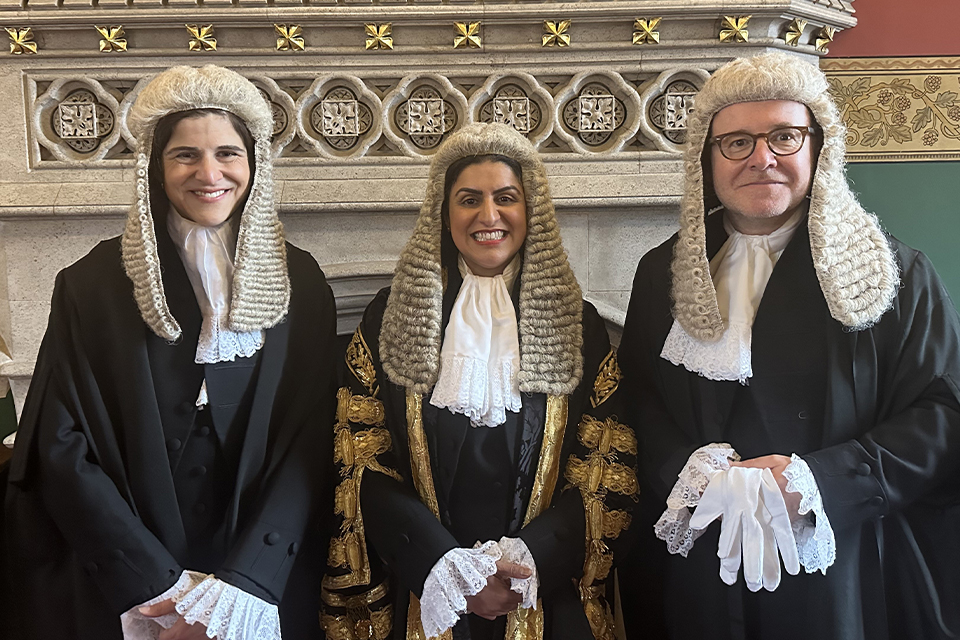
Hermer (right) at his swearing in as Attorney General, alongside Sarah Sackman as Solicitor General and Shabana Mahmood as Lord High Chancellor on 15 July 2024

On 15 July, Hermer was sworn in as Attorney General at the Royal Courts of Justice by Baroness Carr of Walton-on-the-Hill, Lady Chief Justice of England and Wales, alongside Lord Chancellor Shabana Mahmood and Solicitor General Sarah Sackman. In his swearing-in speech, Hermer stated that legal analysis of the law officers would "always be guided by law not politics", and that it was their "job to speak truth to power." Hermer also said in his speech that the values they were seeking to protect were "not the property of any political party" and said that the task had "never been more urgent." He was created a life peer as Baron Hermer, of Penylan in the City of Cardiff, on 18 July. Hermer was introduced to the House of Lords on 22 July. He made his maiden speech on 23 July; in which he said that the government would be "clamping down on improper donations to political parties", and also that they would "reset relations" with the devolved governments and "foster greater collaboration".

=== Government policy ===
==== Agenda ====
In October 2024, Hermer announced in the 2024 Bingham Lecture on the rule of law the government's project of "restoration and resilience", with three themes to guide the project: rebuilding the UK's international rule of law leadership, defending and strengthening Parliament's role in upholding the rule of law, and promoting a rule of law culture which would build public trust in the law and its institutions. In the speech, Hermer confirmed that the government would continue to abide by and unequivocally support the European Convention on Human Rights, and said that walking away total abdication of international law responsibilities. Hermer also confirmed his endorsement for Dapo Akande's nomination to the International Court of Justice. He also said that the government would be "unwavering" in its commitment to tackle climate change.

Hermer has advocated for reform of the UN security council to include permanent representation from Africa, Brazil, India, Japan and Germany. He attended a UN Security Council meeting on 24 October 2024 in New York where he called for the empowering of women and girls so that the need to work together for peace, progress and equality could be achieved.

In April 2025, Hermer, speaking to Parliament's joint committee on human rights, said that people attacking judges on a personal basis, "not simply on social media" but also on the "floor of the House of Commons" meant entering a "dangerous moment", after criticisms of the decisions of a judge by Shadow Justice Secretary Robert Jenrick in February 2025. Hermer described it as "entirely unacceptable" and argued that it created a "huge threat to the rule of law and the independence of the judiciary". He also asserted that there was a "real risk" in the country of the "fabric" and rule of law "unravelling" due to "crime on the streets", and said that in his role it was relevant to discuss government plans through the prism of the rule of law "for safer streets".

In May 2025, Hermer delivered a speech on international law and national security at the Royal United Services Institute (RUSI) in London where he argued that Britain should reject the "temptingly simple narratives" of "pseudo-realism". Hermer declared that "raw and wild power" was "not a realistic way" to advance national interests, and also claimed that "cold war peace is over" and that it is a "truly changed environment."

==== Strengthening of legal risk guidance ====
In November 2024, Hermer strengthened official guidance on legal risk, changing it to say that government lawyers must advise ministers that policies are unlawful if they believed an argument could not be properly put forward in court; reversing the previous changes made by Suella Braverman who had relaxed the guidance. Hermer said that when he had arrived in the position, he was concerned at the guidance and so revised it with the Treasury solicitor and "other legal heads". Hermer asserted that government had tended to work on the basis that it "could favour choices" if they were "legally arguable", but said that in most scenarios he did not want the "legality of government action to be calibrated in accordance with an argument that might be poor", but would not "get counsel struck off". He also stated that "we must be satisfied that the action is lawful", and argued that there were some situations where the law was "uncertain or unclear" and where "clarification" from the court was needed.

Under Hermer's guidance, the ministers should, as a last resort, have put forward arguments that are legitimate but had a high risk of failing. His guidance meant vetting a range of policies to check if they were compliant with domestic and international law.

==== ECHR and immigration cases ====
In January 2025, Hermer visited the Council of Europe, where he affirmed that the new UK government would "never withdraw from the European Convention of Human Rights" or refuse to comply with the "judgement of the court", as well as "requests for interim measures" given in respect of the UK.

In April 2025, Hermer said that it was "entirely right" that Home Secretary Yvette Cooper reviewed how failed asylum seekers and foreign criminals used Article 8 of the ECHR (which protects the right to a family life and privacy), which is often used as reasoning for why a migrant should not be deported. Hermer argued that there was "real merit" in checking Article 8 was being "properly understood and applied" as you could have a "very robust but fair process in asylum and immigration context" that was "entirely compatible" with Article 8. He also said that there needed to be the "right calibration" of casework decisions and also that the government was being robust in appealing against decisions. Hermer stated that they were determined to make sure the asylum system was as "robust, efficient and fair" as it could be, and that you could do an "awful lot" that was compatible with Article 8. He argued that there was "clearly a lot of information" and "misinformation" that was being "whipped up" in the context of Article 8.

Hermer said on the 75th anniversary of the creation of the ECHR that it was a "moment to celebrate it", and stated that Starmer had "made plain" their "unequivocal support" for the convention. Hermer asserted that it was a "point of national pride", and argued that although it reflected "universal values", it was a reflection of "great, longstanding British values" enshrined into British common law.

=== Domestic affairs ===
==== 2024 riots ====
Following riots that occurred after the 2024 Southport stabbing, Hermer attended the emergency COBRA meetings alongside Starmer, Deputy Prime Minister Angela Rayner, Home Secretary Yvette Cooper, other ministers, police leaders and representatives from organisations, which involved updates and plans for responses during the riots.

Hermer later provided his consent to charge several people for what was described as "stirring up racial hatred online", amidst the first sentencing of two individuals for social media-related posts during the riots. In a statement on 9 August, Hermer said that stirring up racial hatred online was "completely unacceptable" and said that it "helped fuel other criminal misconduct". Hermer said that the actions of the two individuals were "harmful and unlawful", and added that their sentences served as a "stark warning" that "you cannot hide behind your keyboard – you will face the full force of the law."

On 23 August 2024, Hermer visited Liverpool following the riots, firstly to Merseyside-Cheshire Crown Prosecution Service (CPS) to thank officials for their roles in charging offenders, then to Spellow Lane library in Walton to donate books following the damage to community hubs there, and lastly to Southport where he met with members of the community at Southport Mosque (the initial target of the Southport riots). Hermer said that he was "acutely aware" of the work that the CPS did with the police to "bring justice" and the role that it had in "quashing the criminality" that was seen on the streets. On his visit to the Spellow Lane library, he said that the space was "emblematic" of the country as it showed how a "tiny minority" could "cause havoc" and described the actions that damaged the library on 3 August as an "appalling act of criminality", but also said that the "really important thing" was that the community came together to "clean" and to "rebuild". Hermer cited his reasoning for visiting Southport mosque as to promote what was "going to be the long lasting message"; saying that the message was that Britain was not represented by the "small minority of criminals" who had been "marauding" through the streets, but instead by the people who "came out to clean the streets" the following day and the "amazing young people" that Hermer had met on his visit there.

During his visit to Liverpool, Hermer confirmed that there would "be more" whilst he was discussing charges and sentencing. He declared that the rioters had not "gotten away" with their actions, and said that they would "feel the consequence." Hermer said that they were really "guided" by the "level of criminality" seen on the streets, and observed that they saw a "large number of people" involved. He noted that there had been over 1100 arrests and 600 charged, and went on to say that he would not pretend that they did not "inherit a criminal justice system with some significant problems", but expressed his confidence in the Crown Prosecution Service, the police and judiciary's ability to "cope with the task" that they were presented.

Hermer attributed the "swift" and "severe" justice that followed the riots as having a significant role in bringing the disorder to an end. He said that people who intended to continue with criminal activity received the "clearest message within days" that there was a "price to pay", and also said that people saw in the "clearest and starkest terms" that justice could be swift and severe which he said played a "major role" in getting the streets safe. He additionally said that people could not "hide behind a keyboard" and said that the authorities would prosecute those who incited "racial and religious hatred online", and commented that anybody who had committed "a serious offence" would "find themselves in a cell."

==== Taylor Swift security controversy ====
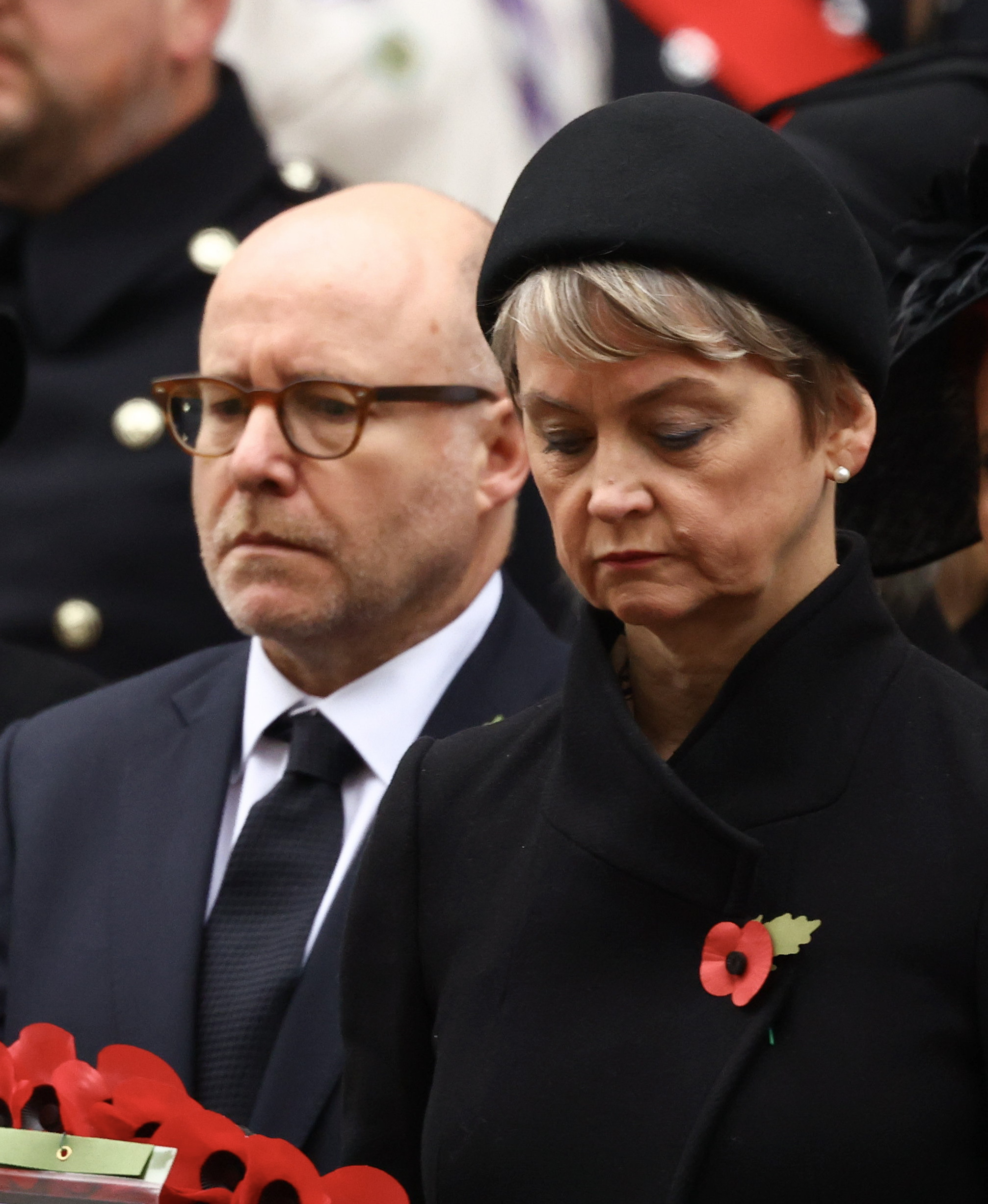
Hermer (left) and Home Secretary Yvette Cooper (right) were at the centre of the controversy

During The Eras Tour by singer Taylor Swift, the metropolitan police provided Swift with a tax-payer funded escort. The Met initially dismissed the idea of giving Swift enhanced security and warned that giving her VVIP protection would breach its long standing protocols. The stance of the met reportedly shifted after Hermer was asked to intervene in the case. It was reported that Hermer effectively provided the necessary legal cover for the police escort to be allowed; The Times claimed that the Met only relented after Hermer's intervention, and critics described it as "highly unusual".

A Conservative Party spokesperson said that Hermer and Home Secretary Yvette Cooper had "serious questions to answer" about the allegations around pressuring the police. The Met did not deny that Hermer had intervened in the issue, and a spokesperson said that the Met was "operationally independent." A spokesperson for Hermer claimed that the decision was "solely an operational decision for the police." Hermer himself later said that there was a convention preventing him from revealing if he had advised on the issue.

==== Axel Rudakubana sentence ====
In January 2025, Axel Rudakubana was sentenced to custody for life with a minimum term of 52 years after he was convicted of 16 offences, and his sentence was subsequently referred to the law officers under the unduly lenient sentence scheme to decide whether to refer the case to the Court of Appeal.

On 14 February, Hermer rejected calls for the Court of Appeal to review the sentence of Rudakubana. In a statement released on the day, Hermer said that it was "understandable" that they had received multiple requests to review the sentence under the scheme, but stated that after "careful consideration of independent legal advice and consultation with leading criminal barristers and the Crown Prosecution Service", he had concluded that the case could not properly be referred to the Court of Appeal.

Hermer said that "no one would want the families to be put through an unnecessary further court process" where there was "no realistic legal basis for an increased sentence". He also said that the sentence was the second longest imposed by the courts in English history, and argued that Rudakubana would likely "never be released" and would "spend the rest of his life in jail".

=== Foreign affairs ===
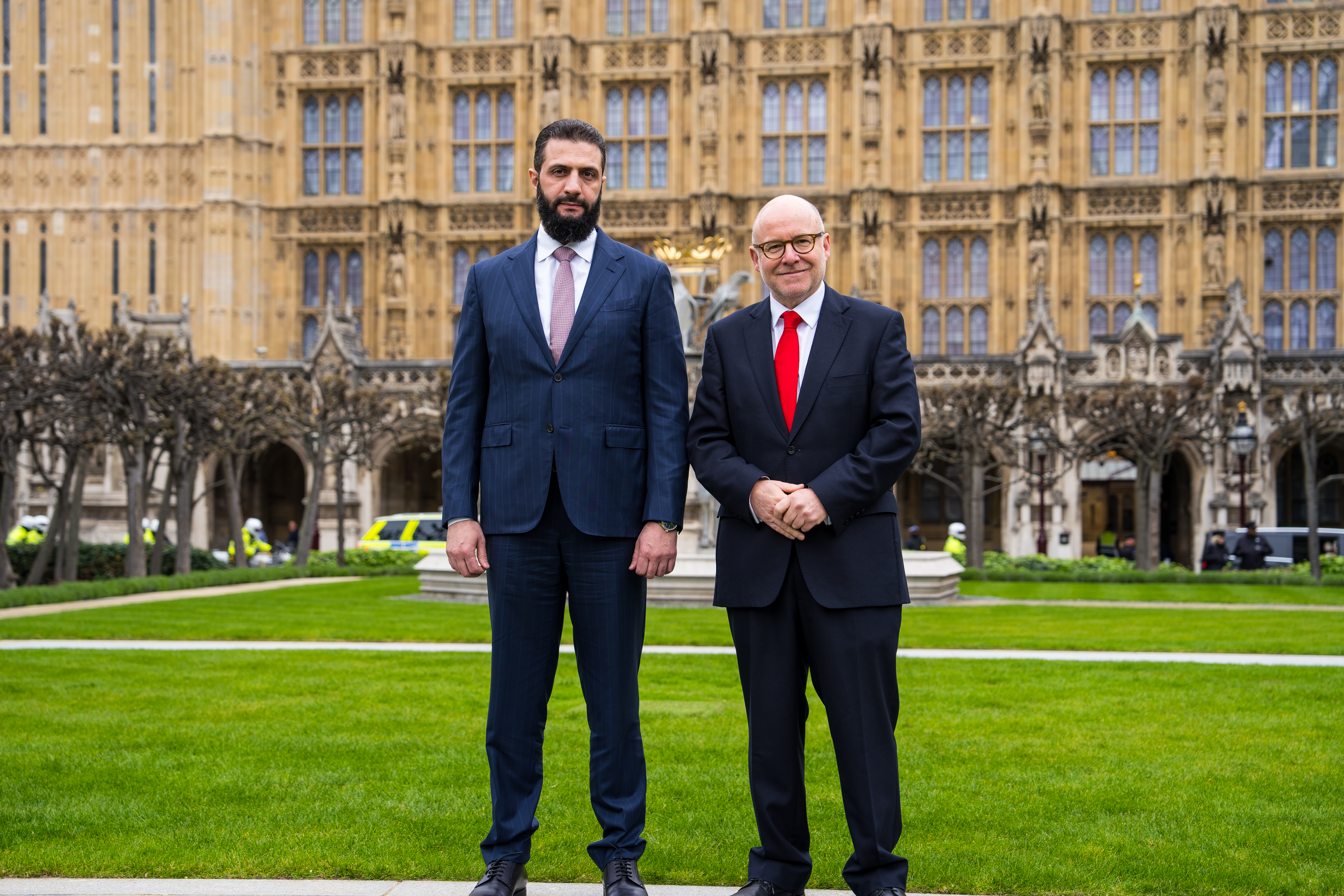
Hermer with Syrian president Ahmed Al-Sharaa in March 2026.

==== Russia–Ukraine war ====
On 19 July 2024, Hermer met virtually with Andriy Kostin, the prosecutor general of Ukraine. On Ukrainian Independence Day on 24 August, Hermer stated "we stand with Ukraine", and also said that "those responsible for atrocities must be held to account."

In September, Hermer visited Ukraine where he went to Kyiv, Bucha and Irpin in order to "drive forward accountability" for Ukraine. During his visit, he opened the United for Justice conference where he spoke alongside Ukrainian President Volodomyr Zelenskyy, Prosecutor General Kostin and International Criminal Court (ICC) Prosecutor Karim Ahmad Khan in Kyiv. Hermer said that the UK supporting Ukraine's "fight for freedom and its fight for justice" and also said that Russia "must be accountable for both specific atrocities and its act of aggression", and also stated that the UK stood with Ukraine from the "battlefield to the court room". Hermer also visited various areas affected by the war, and held discussions with Prosecutor General Kostin.

==== Gaza war and Twelve-Day War ====
On 25 July 2024, Hermer visited Israel to hold talks with his counterparts in the Israeli Ministry of Justice, as well as Justice Minister Yariv Levin and Defence Minister Yoav Gallant, amidst what was reported as a change of the government's legal stance on the conflict in Gaza. In his visit, he confirmed that the United Kingdom would not be pursuing the previous Conservative government's objections to the International Criminal Court's arrest warrant for both Gallant and Israeli Prime Minister Benjamin Netanyahu.

In August, Hermer intervened in the Foreign Office review over whether the government should ban arms sales to Israel, during a reported difficulty for officials to distinguish between "offensive" and "defensive" weapons. Hermer reportedly declined to approve a decision to ban some weapons sales to Israel unless it was proved that those weapons were being used to break international humanitarian law. On 2 September, in a decision coordinated by Hermer, the Foreign Office and the Business and Trade department, the government suspended 30 arms export licenses to Israel after the review found that was a "clear risk" of UK arms being used in violation of humanitarian law.

In October, Hermer confirmed in an interview with The Financial Times that the government would "comply" with their "lawful obligations" regarding any potential arrest warrant for Netanyahu from the International Criminal Court. Hermer also said that the government was determined to not do anything that "undermines the ICC."

In June 2025, following the initial strikes by Israel on Iran, Hermer advised the government that the UK becoming involved in any US strikes on Iran could be illegal, with Hermer being concerned over the UK playing any role in the Twelve-Day War other than defending its allies. He also reportedly had questions over whether the actions of Israel in Iran were legal. The advice was meant to be kept secret in line with the ministerial code, but it was leaked to several media outlets, leading to an official inquiry by the Cabinet Office over the leaks.

==== Chagos Islands deal ====
Hermer was involved in the British government's deal to cede sovereignty of the Chagos Islands to Mauritius. He was reportedly in favour of following the International Court of Justice's ruling that Britain had no sovereignty over the islands, even though the ruling was only advisory. He met with the Mauritian Attorney General, Gavin Glover, on 16 January 2025 in London, but the government described it as a "courtesy" meeting and denied that there was any active negotiation on behalf of the British government.

=== Other notable events and cases ===
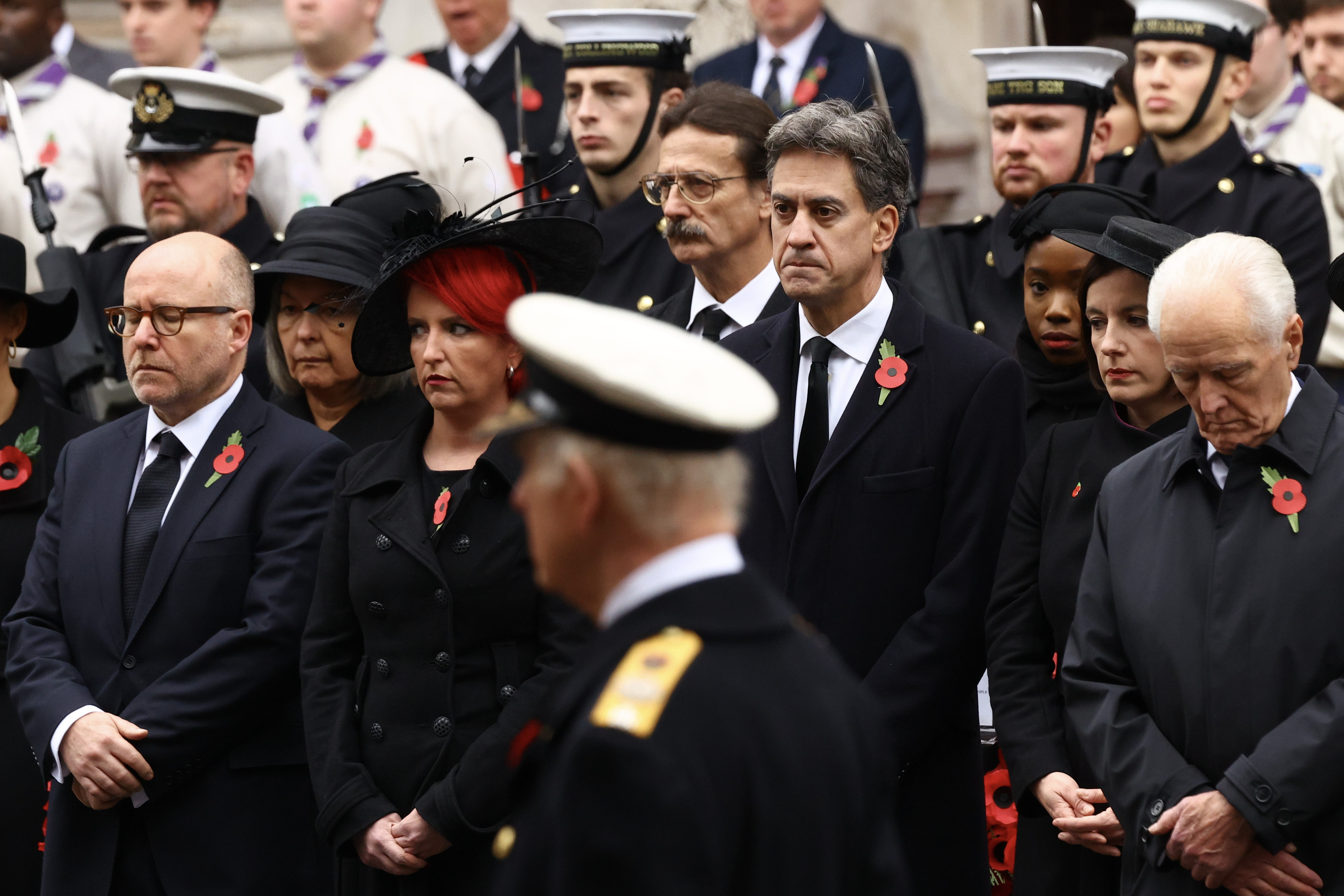
Hermer (left) with Louise Haigh, Ed Miliband and King Charles III (front centre) at Remembrance Sunday in 2024.

On 18 July 2024, five Just Stop Oil protesters, including Roger Hallam, were sentenced for conspiracy to cause public nuisance with sentences between 4–5 years each, believed to be the longest ever sentences for a peaceful protest. After this, an open letter was then addressed to Hermer, which called for an "urgent" meeting between him, Labour donor Dale Vince and broadcaster Chris Packham to discuss what they described as the "jailing of truth tellers and their silencing in court." The letter received signatures from over a thousand from public figures including former Labour leader MP Jeremy Corbyn, former Archbishop of Canterbury Rowan Williams, and musician Chris Martin. In response, a spokesperson for the Attorney General's Office said that "decisions to prosecute, convict and sentence" were "made independently of government" and that Hermer had "no power to intervene."

On 4 September, Hermer, alongside Solicitor General Sackman, visited Northern Ireland in their first visit to the region as law officers. Hermer was called to the Bar of Northern Ireland in a traditional ceremony held at the Northern Ireland Bar, which he described as "hugely poignant". He also met with Attorney General for Northern Ireland Brenda King and other officials.

=== Criticism and controversy in 2025 ===
==== Conflicts of interest controversy ====
In January 2025, Hermer faced criticism for his alleged conflicts of interest regarding his cases in his past legal career whilst in his role as attorney general.

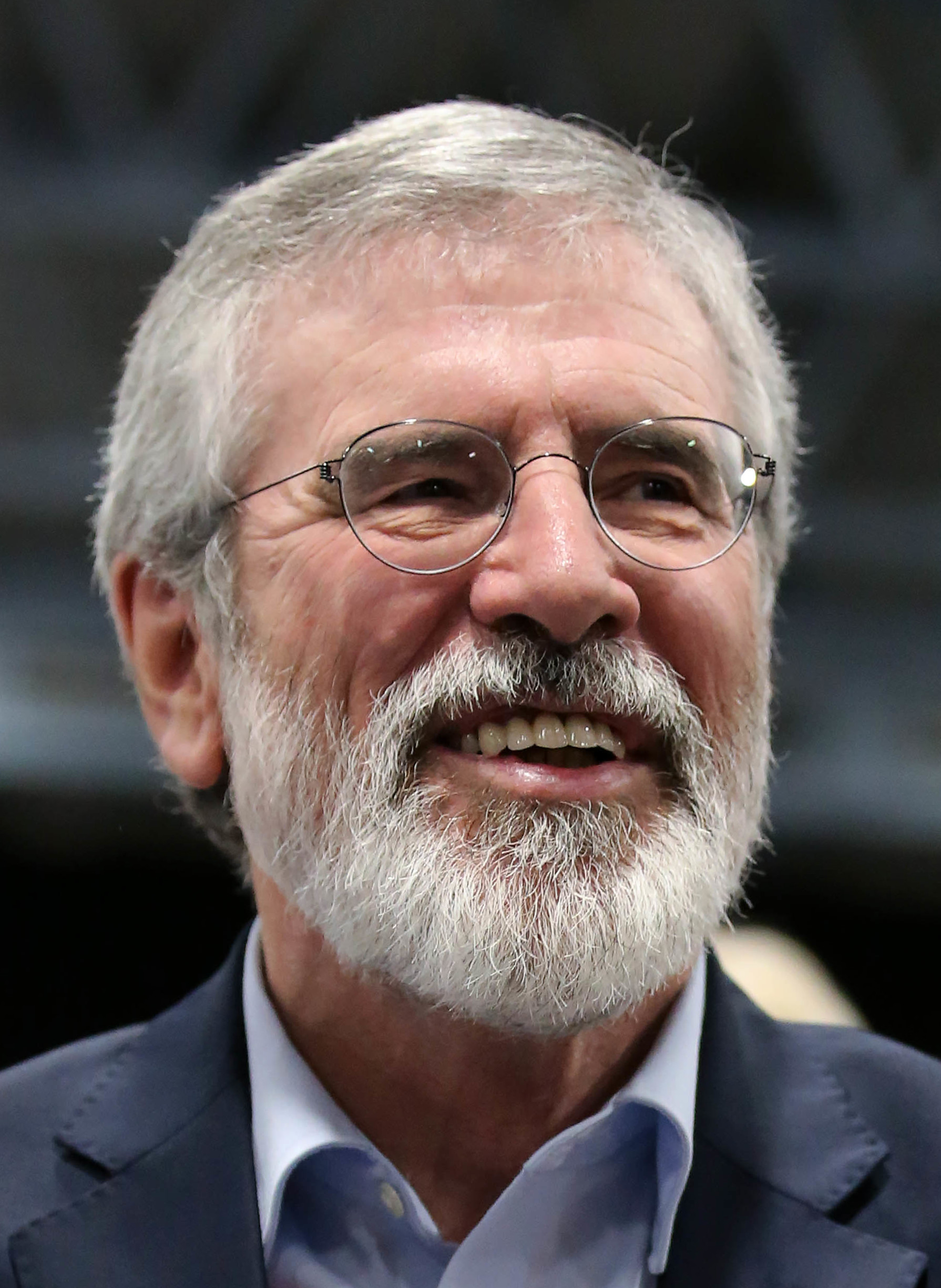
Hermer's previous representation of Gerry Adams (pictured) started the controversy.

The initial controversy began when the government decided to repeal the Troubles legislation, which Hermer's former client Gerry Adams reportedly stood to benefit from. The Legacy Act blocked his claim for compensation over his imprisonment for suspected terrorism in the 1970s, but the government's plans would reverse two sections of the Act which denied Adams and others detained in the 1970s the right to claim compensation. On 15 January, whilst appearing at the Justice Select committee, he was asked by Conservative MP Ashley Fox whether he had been involved in the decision to repeal the ban on compensation, and Hermer said that the law officers' convention precluded "any minister from saying whether the law officers" had been "asked to advise on any given issue". Hermer also defended his previous representation of Adams, arguing that it was part of Britain's rule of law that lawyers could represent clients "irrespective of their own views as to what their client did, whether it was morally right or wrong." Hermer also said that he "could not recall" whether he had acted under any form of conditional fee agreement for Adams in the past when asked by Fox.

Further controversy arose when the Shadow Justice Secretary, Robert Jenrick, called for Hermer to "publicly recuse" himself from the Afghanistan inquiry due to his previous involvement in it, and Jenrick also questioned whether Hermer's recent legal experience would mean that he was "significantly" constrained in the role and also warned that Hermer's could become "untenable". Jenrick also stated that there had "never before" been an Attorney General who had previously taken up cases against the British government to "such a degree" as Hermer. Fox said to The Telegraph that Hermer should "seriously consider" whether he was "capable of giving the objective advice required by his position". Former Attorney General and Home Secretary, Suella Braverman, wrote in The Telegraph that Hermer should "come clean" about his past clients – "or resign". Braverman said that the law officers' convention offered "thin cover", and argued that the "perception of bias" regarding Hermer's involvement in the Afghanistan inquiry was "undeniable."

Further conflict of interest allegations emerged on 18 January, following the revelation that asylum seekers that Hermer previously represented were granted a "one-off" deal to come to the Britain from the Chagos Islands. Months after his appointment as Attorney General, the government granted the deal to 61 asylum seekers, which included the asylum seekers he previously represented. Jenrick said that the public would be asking where Hermer's "loyalties lie", and said that it was "unacceptable" for the government to "hide behind convention". Jenrick also stated that Hermer could not "lecture about the rule of law while dodging fundamental questions about conflicts of interest", and called on Hermer to "urgently come clean and explain to the British public whether he was involved" in the decisions "in government." The Attorney General's Office refused to say whether Hermer had signed off on the deal. Amidst the controversy, after reports of Hermer's involvement in the case regarding the mother of an "ISIS beatle", Shadow Foreign Secretary and former Home Secretary, Priti Patel, said to The Telegraph that Hermer appeared to prioritise the "rights of illegal migrants, terrorists and criminals above the security and safety of our peoples".

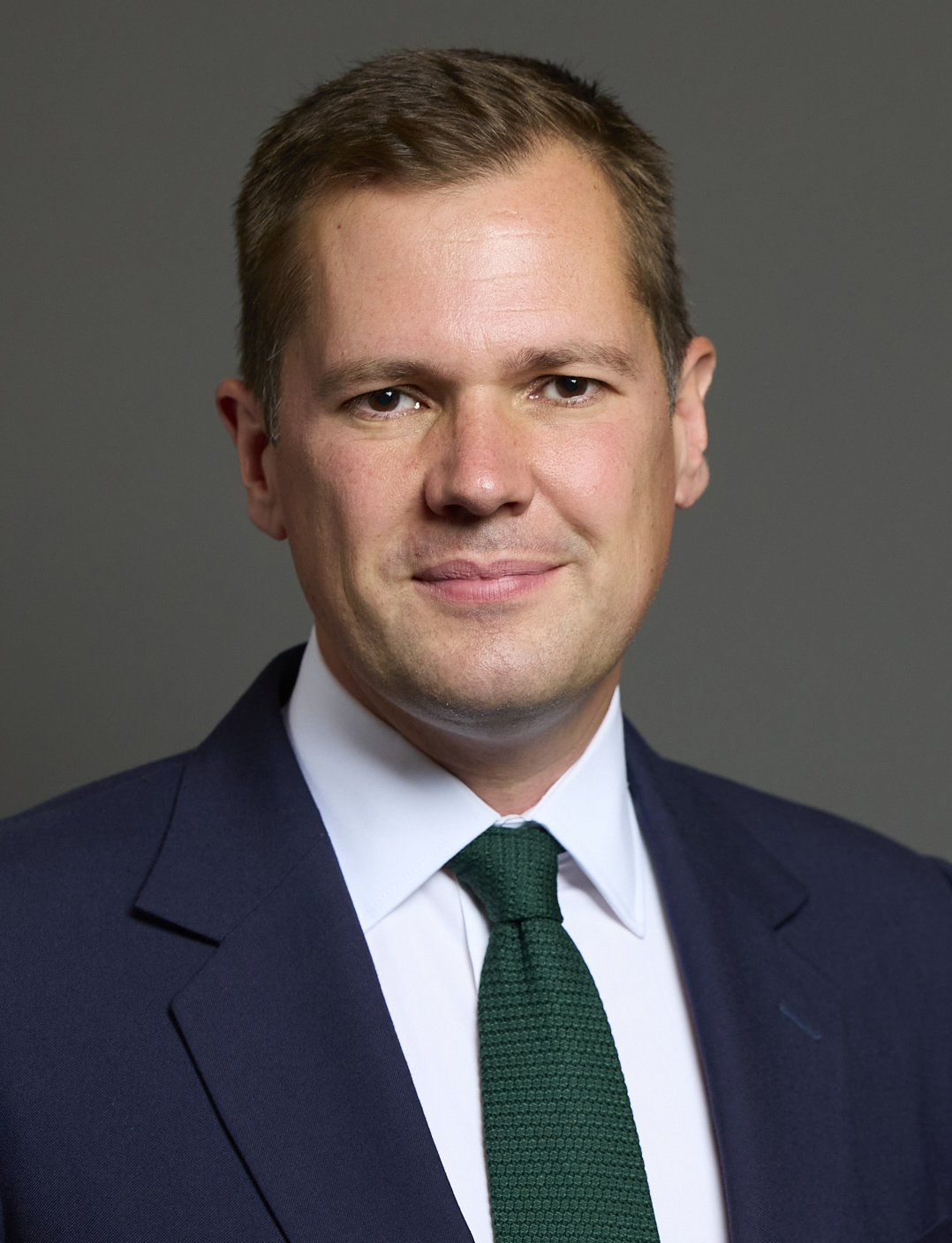
Shadow Justice Secretary Robert Jenrick (pictured) called for an investigation into Hermer.

On 19 January, Jenrick wrote to Cabinet Secretary, Chris Wormald, to ask him to investigate Hermer over potential conflicts of interest. Jenrick named at least four main issues where Hermer faced a potential conflict of interest: representation of Sri Lankan asylum seekers, representation of Gerry Adams, representation of Afghan families, and representation of interested parties in the Shamima Begum case. Former Justice minister, Lord Faulks, wrote that it was of considerable importance that Hermer should "make clear whether he recused himself", whilst former Lord Chancellor and Solicitor General, Robert Buckland, said that there was "no constitutional basis" for Hermer to "refuse to answer questions" from parliamentarians or the public over whether he had recused himself from involvement in matters relating to a possible conflict of interest.

Wormald wrote to Jenrick on 23 January in which he rejected calls for an investigation into Hermer. On the same day, Solicitor General Lucy Rigby said in the House of Commons that Wormald had said that there was a "rigorous system" in place to avoid conflicts, and Rigby also asserted that there had been a "cynical linking in recent days by the opposition of the attorney general with some of his previous clients". On 24 January, Shadow Home Secretary Chris Philp, said that Hermer's active involvement in contentious cases would likely cause concern for the new Trump administration, and also called for the government to ensure that Hermer recuse himself from any matters relating to his past legal cases.

In response to an urgent question in the House of Lords on 27 January, Hermer said that it was "vital" that the public were reassured that the "highest standards of propriety were applied" and said that his department would "always err on the side of caution" whenever there was a "reasonable doubt" over whether a law officer should be recused. Hermer also admitted that he had recused himself from "certain matters", but said that convention precluded him from "identifying those instances".

In April 2025, in response to questions over how he ensured the government received impartial legal advice after his career, Hermer said short answer was by doing the best he could. He then argued it was "absolutely essential" that "governments of whatever colour" received "objective, legal advice."

==== Earnings declaration controversy ====
Amidst the conflicts of interest controversy, on 26 January, further criticism of Hermer occurred following revelations that he had not disclosed any earnings since he joined the government in July 2024. Ministers are usually required to declare earnings they receive once in their roles, but Hermer's office noted that this did not apply to earnings before he entered parliament, which raised the possibility that Hermer received payments in the previous six months from cases he took on before entering government through conditional fee arrangements. Jenrick wrote to the House of Lords standards commissioner in which he called for an investigation into Hermer to find whether any rules had been broken. In his letter, Jenrick said that it was noted with concern that there was the absence of any declarations from Hermer's work at Matrix Chambers from the register of interests, and described the omission as "particularly significant". When he appeared before the Justice select committee on 15 January, Hermer said that he was unable to recall whether he had acted under any conditional fee arrangements for certain clients. Hermer declined to declare any earnings from any time since he joined the government.

Solicitor General Lucy Rigby and her predecessor Sarah Sackman both declared their earnings from previous legal work, which led to accusations of hypocrisy over Hermer's refusal to declare. On 28 January, Hermer was accused of breaking convention by Robert Buckland and former Attorney General Michael Ellis. Ellis said that it was an extraordinarily and highly irregular situation, whilst Buckland said that Hermer was bound by the House of Lords code of conduct. On 29 January, the commissioner told Jenrick that there was no breach and no grounds to investigate.

==== Criticism of legal risk guidance ====
On 31 January 2025, The Times quoted ministers who were upset with Hermer's guidance, with once source from The Times saying that Hermer "thinks he makes policy", and accused Hermer of blocking policies to such an extent that it had caused a "freeze on government". Following the reports, on the same day, the Prime Minister's spokesperson said that Starmer had "absolute confidence" in Hermer.

Hermer later rejected claims that his guidance on legal risk was delaying government policy, and argued that the changes he had made were a "tweak" to give ministers an "unvarnished assessment" of legal risk. He stated that he did not think that it was "in any sense" blocking or slowing a government that wanted to abide by the rule of law or ministers who wanted to abide by the ministerial code.

==== Further criticism and calls for dismissal ====
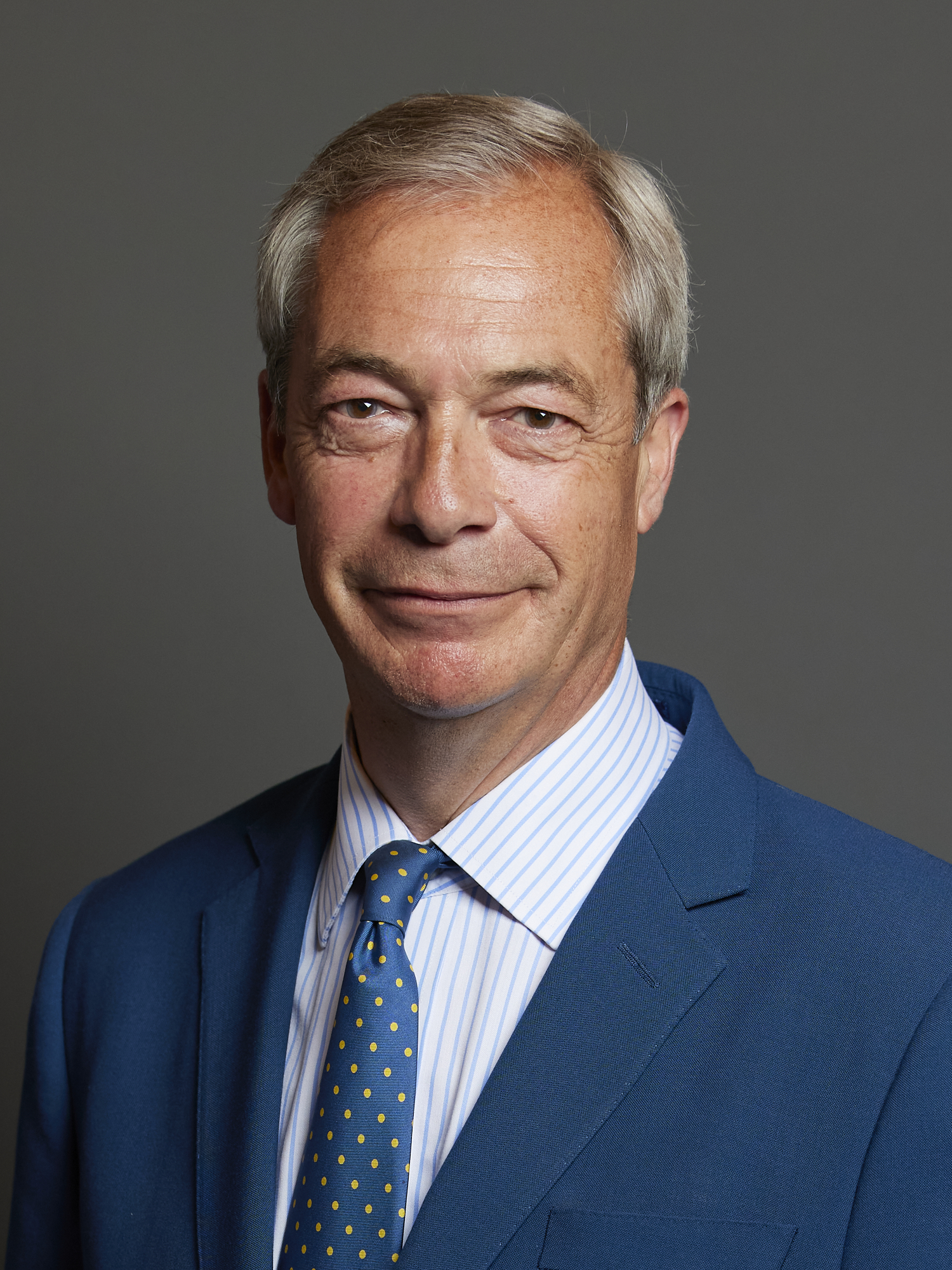
The Leader of Reform UK, Nigel Farage,(pictured) called for Hermer's dismissal.

Following revelations of comments made about the British Empire on his podcasts, former Leader of the Opposition and Leader of the Conservative Party, Iain Duncan Smith, said that Hermer had a classic "nasty" left wing view of life, and said that a "period of silence" from Hermer would be "most welcome". The Deputy Leader of Reform UK, Richard Tice, described Hermer as a "clear and present danger" to the country. On 7 February, the Leader of Reform UK, Nigel Farage, called for Starmer to dismiss Hermer for what Farage described as Hermer's "unforgivable" role in the "betrayal" of the national interest over the Chagos islands deal. On 10 February, Labour peer, Lord Glasman, described Hermer as an "arrogant, progressive fool", and also called for Hermer to be dismissed as Attorney General. Elsewhere, Mayor of Greater Manchester, Andy Burnham, said that he was extremely concerned by reports that Hermer had held up the implementation of the Hillsborough law.

In Prime Minister's Questions on 12 February, Leader of the Opposition Kemi Badenoch, said that "very serious questions" were being asked about Hermer and referred to Lord Glasman's comments about him. Badenoch went on to say that it was necessary to appoint people who believed in the country and everything it stands for, and argued that it was "not clear" that Hermer did. Conservative MP Saqib Bhatti asked Starmer about several of the controversial issues surrounding Hermer and asked if Starmer had confidence in him, to which Starmer said that there was a longstanding principle that everybody was entitled to legal representation, which he stated meant lawyers "did not necessarily agree with their clients." Conservative MP David Reed also asked why Starmer and his "North London lawyer friends" were "giving away" the Chagos islands. On 13 February, Conservative peer Lord Balfe asked why Hermer seemed to never been seen in the House of Lords; Hermer made four spoken contributions at the dispatch box between his appointment in July and Balfe's question in February. In response to Balfe's question, Baroness Twycross said that she saw Hermer "pretty regularly".

Numerous Labour MPs called for ethics tsar Laurie Magnus to investigate Hermer for potential conflicts of interest. MP Graham Stringer criticised Hermer for not being "forthcoming" about the potential conflicts of interest, and said that the potential breaches demanded "comprehensive answers". Conservative MP Gavin Williamson wrote to Starmer on 15 February raising concerns that Hermer had breached the ministerial code, and also asked for Hermer to be referred to Magnus. On 17 February, the Prime Minister's spokesperson reiterated that Starmer had confidence in Hermer, but declined to say whether Hermer would still be in post by the end of the Parliament.

In March, Hermer was accused of blocking a plan to use frozen Russian assets to pay for the defence of Ukraine. The Times reported that some members of the government criticised him for warning ministers against seizing Russian assets that had been "in limbo" since the 2022 invasion. Following this, Liberal Democrat Shadow Attorney General, Ben Maguire, wrote to Hermer where he called for him to publish the legal advice that was provided to the government about the seizing of the frozen Russian assets held in the UK.

In April, in response to Hermer's criticisms of personal attacks on judges, Jenrick argued that the rule of law did "not prevent" politicians or other citizens from "publicly disagreeing" with the decision of judge. Jenrick further criticised Hermer, stating that he seemed "intent on hijacking the rule of law in favour of rule by lawyers", and described Starmer as being "ruled by lawyers".

==== RUSI speech and Nazi comparison controversy ====
In Hermer's RUSI speech, which was delivered on 29 May, he rebuked Leader of the Opposition Kemi Badenoch and Shadow Attorney General Lord Wolfson, stating their arguments if ever adopted "would provide succour to Putin." Hermer argued that the UK faced disintegration and would become less prosperous and secure if it took a pick-and-mix approach to international law. In his lecture, he also defended the approach of the government, saying that it was a "rejection of the siren song that can now sadly be heard in the Palace of Westminster, not to mention some sections of the media, that Britain abandon the constraints of international law in favour of raw power." He went on to say the "claim that international law is fine as far as it goes, but can be put aside when the conditions change, is a claim that was made in the early 1930s by realist jurists in Germany, most notably by Carl Schmitt, whose central thesis in essence that state power is all that counts, not law." Hermer accused Conservative party critics of making arguments suited to a "university debating chamber" and described their analysis as the "precise opposite of realistic" and as "deeply unworldly." Hermer also criticised former prime minister Boris Johnson, stating that no one "could sensibly argue that the bombast of Johnson increased the standing of the United Kingdom in the globe", as well as criticising the Rwanda deportation scheme and the refusal of Liz Truss to say whether France was a friend or foe.

Hermer's comments were widely interpreted in the media as comparing leaving the ECHR to early advancements in 1930s Nazi Germany, with many media sources reporting that the comments were aimed at anti-ECHR Conservatives and Reform. His comments attracted widespread backlash and criticism. After the comments, Shadow Paymaster General Richard Holden stated that Hermer was not fit to be Attorney General, whilst Reform UK Deputy Leader Richard Tice similarly said that Hermer had "shown himself unfit" to be Attorney General. Shadow Home Secretary Chris Philp said that he should be "fired", and Conservative MP Ben Obese-Jecty said "his sacking in the reshuffle should be inevitable". Badenoch said that it was not just embarrassing but "dangerous", and argued that Hermer did "not understand government", and argued that if Starmer had any backbone he would "sack" Hermer. Farage said the comments were "disgraceful" and stated that Starmer and Hermer were "out of touch with British public opinion".

Following the comments, Hermer's spokesperson stated that he "rejected the characterisation" of his speech by the Conservatives, but he acknowledged though "his choice of words was clumsy" and regretted "having used this reference". After Hermer's response, Farage said the apology was something but claimed that Hermer summed up the "failing" government, and Jenrick said his comments were an appalling smear and described him as a "liability". The Times reported that Hermer faced cabinet backlash following the comments, and Labour MP Graham Stringer said that it was a mistake to appoint somebody with "no obvious political experience" to a senior cabinet position. Education Minister Catherine McKinnell stated before Hermer's response that he had given a "quite thoughtful speech about international law", while Defence Secretary John Healey said after his response that Hermer made a "mistake".

==== Renewed criticism and further calls for dismissal ====
Hermer faced accusations of hypocrisy when he approved a trespassing charge against ousted Myanmar ambassador, Kyaw Zwar Minn, for refusing to leave the ambassador's residence after he was sacked by the State Administration Council junta in April 2021. His former legal firm initiated legal action against Facebook for hosting hate speech against the Rohingya people. A spokesperson for the Attorney General's office stated that the Crown Prosecution Services has not yet decided whether enough evidence or public interest is there to recommend prosecution. They further outlined that independent law officers ultimately needed to consent to the Crown's recommendations before continuing the case.

Hermer faced renewed criticism when his office confirmed that he had personally approved the prosecution of Lucy Connolly, whose sentence of two and a half years for stirring up racial hatred following a tweet after the 2024 Southport stabbing became highly divisive and debated due to the length of the sentence, although he had the constitutional power to prevent it. Former Attorney General Braverman said that he was enforcing "two-tier Britain" under "two-tier Keir", while Badenoch repeated her calls for Hermer to be dismissed. This generated further controversy when The Telegraph reported that Hermer declined to review unduly lenient sentences given to a paedophile, rapist, and a terrorist fundraiser, who all had been given shorter sentences that Connolly. Tice said that Hermer should either resign or be dismissed while Jenrick said that it defied "common sense". Badenoch again renewed calls for Starmer to dismiss Hermer, arguing that he believed in the "rule of lawyers" and not the rule of law. Philp said in the House of Commons that Hermer had "appalling judgement", and when Conservative MP Julian Lewis asked Home Secretary Yvette Cooper to answer the question over Hermer's decisions, Cooper said that Hermer did "not decide sentencing".

Jenrick further criticised Hermer by taking to social media on 3 June where he posted a 2-minute video in which he argued that Hermer had defended "some pretty rotten folk". The video gained over 1.5 million views on X in less than 24 hours, and in it Jenrick argued that the cab-rank rule did not apply to Hermer, as he was a "top human rights lawyer" so would have been "inundated with cases, able to choose the pick of the bunch". In response to Jenrick's video, Hermer's friend, lawyer Ben Williams, said that it was an entirely fair political comment and described Hermer as "an open activist throughout his career". Later on that month, he was further criticised after revelations that he did not review sentences of four members of a West Yorkshire grooming gang for unduly lenient sentences, with Jenrick describing it as "outrageous" while Tice said that Hermer appeared to be "soft on child sex offenders".

Following Hermer's advice over the involvement of the UK in the Twelve-Day War, Braverman argued that he should "not have a veto on military action" and described him as a "robed inquisitor" and "unelected".

=== Reception ===
In November 2024, The Spectator reported that four months into his time in office, Hermer had shown himself to be one of the most prominent law offices of recent decades, and claimed that his influence in government was growing. In December, Leader of the Opposition Kemi Badenoch referenced Hermer in PMQs, saying that Starmer had appointed Shamima Begum's defence lawyer as Attorney General.

In January 2025, The Times described him as Starmer's "legal warrior in a lawless world" and said that he was arguably more powerful than Foreign Secretary David Lammy, whilst The Telegraph said that the "parachuting" of Hermer into parliament had given "Starmer a headache". In February 2025, The Times said that his influence was "growing across government" and "frustrating ministers". Following PMQs on 12 February the New Statesman question whether Hermer was Starmer's "biggest weakness", whilst The Independent described him as a "legal time bomb" for Starmer. The Guardian said that he "became a lightning rod for criticism of Starmer", whilst The Jewish Chronicle questioned whether Hermer would still be in post after a cabinet reshuffle. The Times reported that "insiders" regarded Hermer as either an angel or devil on Starmer's left shoulder, and also noted that his reputation as a blocker led to him being dubbed the "Herminator".

In April 2025, The Times reported that his seal of approval was "being applied more liberally", and that Number 10 strategists found him "a breath of fresh air." In May, The Spectator said that he was "preposterously wrong about international law, and in June, The Telegraph said that he was "putting the British public at risk".

=== Dismissal ===
On 20 July 2026, Hermer left government after being dismissed by Andy Burnham.

== Political positions ==
=== Self-described ideology ===
Hermer does not ally himself to any particular faction within the Labour party, and has said he has never viewed factionalism as "particularly helpful for a political party".

The only Labour leader Hermer definitely rejects as not aligning with his political philosophy is Jeremy Corbyn, arguing that Corbyn's politics "did not represent the politics that gave Labour any realistic prospects on being in government". Hermer also accredits Starmer of having been able to "detoxify the party".

=== Same-sex marriage ===
Hermer was one of numerous British Jews who were signatories to a letter in July 2012 which criticised Chief Rabbi Lord Sacks for opposing same-sex marriage.

=== British Empire, reparations and statues ===
In a podcast looking at the impact of the Black Lives Matter movement in 2020, Hermer said he had represented Caribbean nations on a case regarding potential reparations, and said that there was a "moral argument" for Britain to pay. In the same podcast, Hermer said that "obviously statues of people like Rhodes and slave owners" should go. He also said that every Education Secretary should be forced to read about the violence of the British Empire when they took office.

In a podcast in 2022, Hermer said that racism impacted "almost every element" of the British Empire. He also said that Britain was a country where notions of empire remained a good thing, and said that it was based on a deeply racist assumption that other nations are not as good as us. He additionally said that there was a "kind of myopia" in Britain or a "collective amnesia" when it came to the "collective past" of Britain. He also said that you could only buy into the notion of British exceptionalism "if you ignore history".

=== Environmental activists ===
In a podcast in May 2023, while discussing new laws design to deal with disruptive marches by groups such as Just Stop Oil, Hermer said that we were seeing "so many people", and in particular "young people", who were "so concerned about the future of the planet". He went on to say that the fact they were willing to "come out in their numbers and onto the streets" and "demonstrate" in the way that they did was "frankly inspiring".

=== Israeli–Palestinian conflict ===
In 2011, Hermer co-wrote a chapter in the book Corporate Complicity in Israel's Occupation: Evidence from the London Session of the Russell Tribunal on Palestine, about the breach of international law by transnational companies.

When the Conservative government introduced its bill outlawing the Boycott, Divestment and Sanctions movement in Britain, Labour sought advice from Hermer. Hermer's response was that the bill would reduce free speech and adversely affect the UK's human rights standing, and was in breach of the UK's obligations under international law.

In May 2023, Hermer was amongst many lawyers who signed a Lawyers for Palestinian Human Rights letter addressed to Foreign Secretary James Cleverly, which called on the government to constructively participate in the International Court of Justice advisory opinion on the legal consequences of the actions of Israel in occupied Palestinian territory including East Jerusalem.

In July 2023, Hermer stated that he believed that the "continued Israeli occupation of the West bank" was "unlawful, deeply damaging to the interests of Israel and wholly contrary to the values of tikkun olam" which Hermer grew up with and continued to be guided by.

In October 2023, Hermer was amongst eight prominent Jewish lawyers, which included former Supreme Court President Lord Neuberger, who signed an open letter to call on Israel to follow international law in its response to the 7 October attacks. Later that month, in an interview with LBC whilst speaking to Sangita Myska, he said that it was "impossible to conceive" how Israel's siege was "in compliance with international law". He said that Israel has controlled the borders of Gaza for a long time and that it was an "understatement" to say that stopping electricity, water and food entering Gaza was "very, very difficult to reconcile with obligations of international law".

In January 2025, at the Jewish Labour Movement's annual conference, Hermer said that his frustration about the conflict was that "somehow you have to pick one-side or the other". He also said that a world where you could not "love being in Israel" but also not be "deeply concerned about the plight of Palestinians" was not one he wanted to be in.

=== Rwanda asylum plan and illegal migration ===
In January 2024, Hermer, along with his colleagues Helen Mountfield and Murray Hunt, criticised the illegality of the Rwanda bill in a podcast. He described the debate around immigration and asylum in the country as "toxic", and also said that Mountfield, Hunt and he were "acutely conscious" that slogans such as "stop the boats" and "control our borders" were capable of being not only "distracting", but also "dehumanising".

In October 2024, Hermer said that he watched with a "mixture of fury, disbelief and profound sadness" as the previous Conservative government introduced the Safety of Rwanda Act, and said that the "constitutional heresies contained within the act" were significant. He also said that the act began with an "otiose and crass assertion of parliamentary sovereignty" and that it "ousted the role of the courts in determining relevant facts" and to "accept as true facts that may well be false".

=== European Union and Brexit ===
In an interview with The Times in April 2020, when asked what law he would enact, Hermer said it would be "the European Union (Please Can We Come Back?) Act 2020". He went on to say that never had "international co-ordination and solidarity been more important."

=== Donald Trump ===
Hermer has described U.S. President Donald Trump as "such a coward" and an "autocratic populist", and also called him an "orange tyrant", as well as accusing him of running a government of "chaos and hatred".

==== Pandemic and 2020 election ====
Hermer said that Trump was perhaps "the most brazen liar" that one had ever come across in a political position in a podcast from May 2020. The podcast discussed Trump's approach to the rule of law during the COVID-19 pandemic, and Hermer went on to say politicians had always lied but that Trump was "on a different scale" and "of a different nature".

When Joe Biden was answered as to who would win the 2020 U.S. presidential election, Hermer in response said "right answer, I hope". After the election, Hermer said that his podcast was "anything but neutral" and stated that it was a "huge relief" to say that Biden had won. He also said that it was "even more" of a "pleasure" to say out loud that Trump lost.

==== Trump and torture ====
In 2016, Hermer was critical of Trump, while he was President-elect, for Trump's previous comments regarding torture. He suggested that the UK government could use its influence to convince Trump that his threatened return to the use of torture and inhumane treatment as a method of counter-terrorism "would be a disaster for all of us."

Hermer called on Prime Minister Theresa May to be "emphatic" in her approach to Trump and torture. He cited torture as being "morally repugnant" and "counter-productive", and said that the UK should make a "clear stand" on its position on torture.

=== Populism ===
Hermer views populism as a "divisive and disruptive force". He stated that populism has been seen, in its "most pernicious forms", working to "demonise other groups – usually minorities and to discredit the legal frameworks and institutions that guarantee their rights, and dismantle, often through calculated misinformation, the political consensus that underpins them." He also said that it should be recognised that populists had "stolen a march".

== Personal life ==
Hermer was brought up in a Jewish family, though he now describes himself as a "deeply cynical agnostic" and an atheist. He is a member of Alyth, a Reform synagogue in Temple Fortune, London. In July 2023, he said that he had family members who were serving in the Israel Defense Forces. He previously gave legal advice to Searchlight magazine and was also patron of Searchlight Research Associates.

Hermer is married and has 2 daughters. He lives in North London, and is a fan of Welsh rugby teams. He is a cousin of Jonathan Shalit.

Hermer is a friend of Keir Starmer, having met him on his first night at Doughty Street Chambers in 1996; The Guardian describes them as having a "close relationship". He is also a friend of David Wolfson, Baron Wolfson of Tredegar.

== Honours and recognition ==
- In 2009, Hermer took silk, i.e. was appointed Queen's Counsel (now KC).
- In August 2011, Hermer was named The Times lawyer of the week.
- On 9 July 2024, Hermer was nominated Group litigation silk of the year in the 2024 Legal 500 Bar awards.
- On 10 July 2024, Hermer was sworn of the Privy Council, entitling him to be styled "The Right Honourable" for life.

== Notes ==
Political offices
Preceded by Victoria Prentis	Attorney General for England and Wales; 2024–2026	Succeeded by Ellie Reeves
Preceded by Victoria Prentis	Advocate General for Northern Ireland; 2024–2026	Succeeded by Ellie Reeves
Orders of precedence in the United Kingdom
Preceded by The Lord Timpson	Gentlemen; Baron Hermer	Followed by The Lord Hanson of Flint
