= Nick Markham, Baron Markham =

British businessman (born 1968)

The Right Honourable The Lord Markham CBE
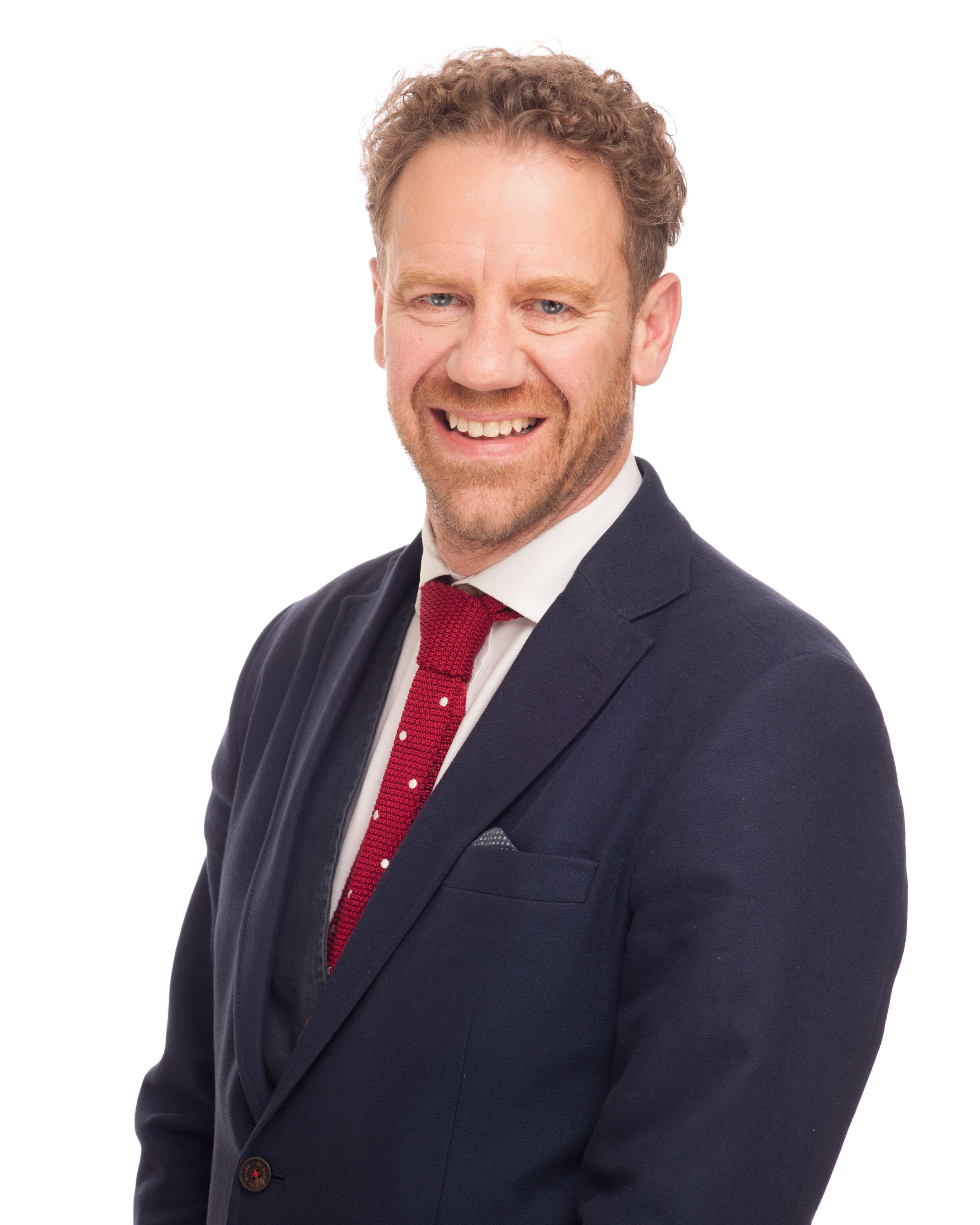

Shadow Minister for Science, Innovation and Technology
- In office 1 September 2024 – 22 July 2026
- Leader: Rishi Sunak; Kemi Badenoch

Parliamentary Under-Secretary of State for Health and Social Care
- In office 22 September 2022 – 5 July 2024
- Prime Minister: Liz Truss; Rishi Sunak
- Preceded by: The Lord Kamall

Member of the House of Lords
- Lord Temporal
- Life peerage 7 October 2022

Personal details
- Born: 13 February 1968 (age 58) Haywards Heath, West Sussex, England
- Party: Conservative
- Education: LSE
- Occupation: Co-Founder Cignpost Diagnostics Ltd. Lead NED Dept Work & Pensions; NED Inchora Ltd.

Nicholas Francis Markham, Baron Markham (born 13 February 1968) is a British Businessman and Conservative member of the House of Lords. He was formerly a government junior minister at the UK's Department of Health and Social Care. Markham was appointed Commander of the Order of the British Empire (CBE) in the 2022 Birthday Honours for services to the economy and government.

== COVID-19 ==
At the beginning of the pandemic, he set up a charity, Project Little Boat, to deliver PPE and other essential equipment, with Denis Kinane. Markham then co-founded Cignpost Diagnostics with Denis Kinane and Steve Whatley and is the Commercial Lead responsible for building the business. Cignpost has worked with elite sports, film production, travel and banking sectors to ensure they have a safe COVID-19-free working environment and under the consumer brand ExpressTest, to help the public travel safely. Markham's position in Cignpost led to questions about a possible conflict of interest as from early 2023 Markham was a health minister. Markham does not mention Cignpost in his biography for the Department for Health website.

== Career ==
Markham was chairman of London & Continental Railways. Previously he was the lead non-executive director for the Ministry of Housing, Communities and Local Government since January 2013, where he also chaired the Audit and Risk Committee. He was strategy director at ITV where he led the merger integration of Carlton Television (now ITV London) and Granada and developed the concept of Freeview alongside the BBC.

From 1990 to 1998, Markham was a councillor and deputy leader of Westminster City Council.

From 2014 Markham chaired Inview Technology Ltd which went into administration in March 2020 with the loss to investors of over £20 million.

He was CFO for Laura Ashley where he led the financial restructuring of the business.

He was chief executive of Top Up TV, which supplied a range of linear pay TV channels on DTT including Sky Sports 1, 2 and ESPN and which provides conditional-access modules (CAMs) and technical services to BT Vision. According to the Government website Gov.uk Top Up TV was the first successful pay TV operator on digital terrestrial television in the world.

On 22 September 2022, he was appointed Parliamentary Under-Secretary of State in the Department of Health and Social Care. On 7 October 2022, to facilitate his ministerial role, he was created Baron Markham, of East Horsley in the County of Surrey, and was introduced to the House of Lords on 10 October 2022. He sits as a Conservative peer. His was the first life peerage created during Charles III's reign. He became a Shadow Minister for Science, Innovation and Technology under Rishi Sunak and Kemi Badenoch.

== Personal life ==
Markham lives in Surrey with wife Dr Ingrid Batista and their son Xavi. He also has two older children Ben and Sam.

Orders of precedence in the United Kingdom
Preceded by The Lord Bellamy	Gentlemen; Baron Markham	Followed by The Lord Johnson of Lainston
