= Jonathan Shalit =

British talent manager

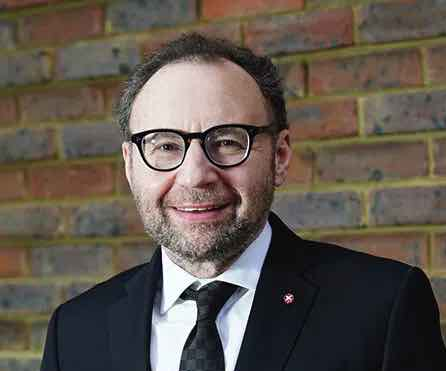
- Jonathan Shalit in 2015
- Born: Jonathan Sigmund Shalit; 17 April 1962 (age 64); United Kingdom
- Education: City of London School
- Occupation: Talent Manager
- Spouse: Katrina Sedley (m. 2010)
- Relatives: Richard Hermer (cousin)
- Website: Jonathan Shalit

Jonathan Sigmund Shalit OBE (born 17 April 1962) is a British talent manager and chairman of the InterTalent Rights Group, formerly ROAR Global and Cole Kitchenn. InterTalent represents household names across broadcasting, film, television, theatre, comedy, music, sport, digital, social media and literature.

He is a regular speaker at UK and global entertainment industry events and advises government on the UK's entertainment and creative industries as well as appearing regularly as a media commentator.

== Career ==
Shalit left the City of London School at the age of 18, working initially as a broker at Lloyd's of London and then worked at advertising company Saatchi & Saatchi before founding his first West End talent management company, Shalit Global, in 1991.

He has managed the careers of stars including Charlotte Church, Mel B, Baroness Brady, Kelly Brook, Cher, Dame Joan Collins, Rebecca Ferguson, Katherine Jenkins, Lorraine Kelly, Myleene Klass, Arlene Phillips, Simon Cowell, and the winners of the ITV television talent show Britain's Got Talent. In 1994, he was instrumental in the making of The Glory of Gershwin, Larry Adler's album of George and Ira Gershwin songs.

As a regular media commentator on entertainment issues, Shalit appears frequently in broadcast and print. Between 2020 and 2022, Shalit, who is Jewish, authored a column for the Jewish Chronicle.

In 2012 he gave evidence to the Leveson Inquiry into the culture, practices and ethics of the British Press. His evidence disputed that given by his former client Charlotte Church, who said that she had been encouraged to perform at Rupert Murdoch's birthday party in exchange for positive media coverage, waiving a £100,000 fee, over a decade previously. In 2000, Shalit had sued Church over his dismissal as her manager and was awarded £2 million, in addition to his legal costs.

Shalit has been executive producer in two movies: Pudsey the Dog: The Movie (2014; also voiced the character Cyril the Chicken) and The Time of Their Lives (2017).

Shalit is chair of trustees and Chief Barker of Variety, the Children's Charity and a leading figure behind the return to London of the Variety Club Showbusiness Awards in 2022. He is also Chairman of the MOBO Charity Foundation (Music of Black Origin), a Trustee of ChickenShed (Theatre Changing Lives), Patron of the Royal Television Society and co-chairman of the Classic BRITS, and a supporter of Norwood.

Shalit was awarded the OBE in 2014 for services to the entertainment industry. He also holds an honorary professorship, awarded in 2012, and honorary doctorate at Henley Business School of Reading University in recognition of his contribution to the arts, music and broadcasting.
