= Economic Activity of Public Bodies (Overseas Matters) Bill =

- Bill
- Parliament of the United Kingdom
- Long title: A Bill to make provision to prevent public bodies from being influenced by political or moral disapproval of foreign states when taking certain economic decisions, subject to certain exceptions; and for connected purposes.
- Introduced by: Michael Gove, Secretary of State for Levelling Up, Housing and Communities (Commons); The Baroness Neville-Rolfe, Minister of State at the Cabinet Office (Lords)
- Territorial extent: United Kingdom

History of passage through Parliament

The Economic Activity of Public Bodies (Overseas Matters) Bill was a proposed Act of the Parliament of the United Kingdom introduced by the Secretary of State for Levelling Up, Housing and Communities, Michael Gove, on 19 June 2023 in the 2022–23 Session of Parliament and carried-over to the 2023–24 Session.

It was part of a response to the Boycott, Divestment and Sanctions movement by the UK Government to promote community cohesion and to ban public bodies from boycotting foreign countries. It was a manifesto commitment of the Conservative Party in their 2019 election manifesto.

== Parliamentary passage ==
The Bill passed the House of Commons on 10 January 2024 and was introduced by the Minister of State at the Cabinet Office, Baroness Neville-Rolfe, to the House of Lords on 11 January 2024.

The Bill was lost in the wash-up period for the 2024 general election, but was at Committee Stage in the Lords at this time.
