= Rangzieb Ahmed =

Alleged Al-Qaeda operative in the United Kingdom

Rangzieb Ahmed is a British citizen who was allegedly the highest ranking al-Qaeda operative in the United Kingdom (UK). Ahmed, who was a key link between British recruits and al-Qaeda leaders, was responsible for setting up a terrorist cell in Manchester and contacting one of the terrorists responsible for the failed London bombings of 21 July 2005.

== Early life ==
Ahmed was born in Rochdale, in Greater Manchester, England, and moved to Pakistan-occupied Jammu and Kashmir at the age of seven or eight. At the age of 18, Ahmed was arrested by Indian forces after allegedly fighting as a member of the Islamic terrorist group, Harkat-ul-Mujahideen, and was held in an Indian jail for seven years without charge; during this time Ahmed was also allegedly tortured. While incarcerated, Ahmed received money from Ahmed Omar Saeed Sheikh, who later allegedly had Daniel Pearl murdered. Ahmed was eventually released in 2001 and he subsequently visited the UK for a brief period of time before returning to Pakistan. He returned to the UK again in 2005.

== Al-Qaeda and British intelligence ==
In 2005, surveillance by British intelligence revealed a diary in Ahmed's possession (located in his luggage at the time) containing al-Qaeda contacts, with some contact details written in invisible ink. Included in the contact list were the personal details of Abu Hamza Rabia, who was later killed in Pakistan on 30 November 2005, during a US/Pakistani joint operation. Traces of explosives were also found on Ahmed's rucksack. Following his arrest, Ahmed was initially held in a secret Pakistani prison facility, where he claims he was tortured alongside Hassan Ghul.

A second confrontation with the UK authorities occurred in 2007 when Ahmed was captured at London's Heathrow Airport following his arrival from Pakistan. On this occasion, he was charged with "directing the activities of an organization which was concerned in the commission of acts of terrorism", "possessing three books containing information which would be useful to a person committing or preparing an act of terrorism", and "possession of a rucksack containing traces of an explosive, in circumstances which suggested it was for a purpose connected with terrorism".

In December 2008, Ahmed was convicted in the UK of "directing the activities of an organization which was concerned in the commission of acts of terrorism". Such a finding of guilt meant that Ahmed was the first member of al-Qaeda to be convicted for directing terrorism in the UK. He was sentenced to life imprisonment and has been directed to serve a minimum of ten years before he is considered for parole.

== Torture controversy ==
On 7 July 2009, David Davis, a British Member of Parliament (MP), accused the UK government of "outsourcing torture". Davis contended that the UK government allowed Ahmed to leave the UK and enter Pakistan (even though they had evidence against him upon which he was later convicted), that Pakistani Inter-Services Intelligence detained and questioned Ahmed under torture, and that British intelligence and police agencies had full knowledge of this. Davis further accused the UK government of trying to gag Ahmed by preventing him from coming forward with accusations after his imprisonment following his return to the UK. Davis stated that there was "an alleged request to drop his allegations of torture: if he did that, they could get his sentence cut and possibly give him some money. If this request to drop the torture case is true, it is frankly monstrous. It would at the very least be a criminal misuse of the powers and funds under the Government's CONTEST strategy, and at worst a conspiracy to pervert the course of justice."

== Appeal quashed ==
During the appeal hearing in 2010, Ahmed's QC, Joel Bennathan, claimed he was beaten and had three of his fingernails pulled out with pliers over the course of three days - and that the UK was "complicit" in acts of torture. He argued that the trial judge should have halted the proceedings against him as an abuse of process.

Ahmed's allegations were rejected at his appeal hearing, his appeal dismissed and his application to have his case be heard by the Supreme Court turned down. On 25 February 2010, Lord Justice Hughes ruled that Ahmed's conviction by the jury was safe. He supported the trial judge's original findings: "...that torture had not been demonstrated to have occurred, and had been demonstrated not to have occurred before the sole occasion when Rangzieb said he had been seen by British officers."

On the suggestion of outsourcing torture by British authorities, the trial judge had found "simply no evidence that they had assisted or encouraged the Pakistani detainers to detain him unlawfully or to ill-treat him in any way, whether amounting to torture or not". Ahmed has since applied to have his case reviewed by the European Court of Human Rights.

== Civil claim ==
In October 2020, Ahmed brought a civil claim against MI5 for suggesting Pakistan's Inter-Services Intelligence agency arrest him in 2006 and collusion in torturing him by submitting questions which were put to him under torture in Pakistan. This claim was rejected by the High Court on 16 December 2020.
