= Lawrence S. Young =

Lawrence S. Young is emeritus professor of molecular oncology at the University of Warwick and director of the Warwick Cancer Research Centre. He was elected a Fellow of the Academy of Medical Sciences in 2007.

In 2013, Young was appointed pro-vice chancellor for strategic planning and resources, and in 2016 he became Vice-President at the University of Warwick.

Before joining Warwick, Young was head of the division of Cancer Studies at the University of Birmingham.

He has an h-index of 109 according to Google Scholar.
