= Lord Marks =

Lord Marks may refer to:

- George Marks, 1st Baron Marks (1858–1938), British engineer and Liberal and Labour politician
- Baron Marks of Broughton, a hereditary title created in 1961
  - Simon Marks, 1st Baron Marks of Broughton (1888–1964), British businessman
- Stuart Marks, Baron Marks of Hale, British businessman and Conservative politician
- Jonathan Marks, Baron Marks of Henley-on-Thames (born 1952), British barrister and Liberal Democrat politician
