= M&S Bank =

British retail bank

HSBC UK Bank plc trading as M&S Bank
- Trade name: M&S Bank
- Formerly: M&S Money; St Michael Financial Services
- Type: Division of HSBC UK Bank plc
- Industry: Finance and Insurance
- Founded: 1985; 41 years ago
- Founder: Marks & Spencer
- Headquarters: Kings Meadow, Chester
- Key people: David Lister (chairman and Non-executive director Colin O’Flaherty (Chief executive)
- Products: Financial services
- Parent: HSBC UK
- Website: bank.marksandspencer.com

M&S Bank is a retail bank operating in the United Kingdom as a division of HSBC UK Bank plc. The company was founded in 1985 as St Michael Financial Services as the financial services division of Marks & Spencer and adopted its current name in 2012.

Initially focused on providing credit through in-house store cards, the bank now provides credit cards, loans and savings accounts for personal customers.

The bank was acquired by HSBC in 2004 though has maintained a partnership agreement with M&S. It operated under its own banking licence until 2026, and continues to retain its own board and occupy its purpose-built headquarters in Chester.

== History ==
The bank was launched by Marks & Spencer as St Michael Financial Services in 1985, using the company's then main house brand. It initially specialised in operating its 'Chargecard' store card, before moving on to launch other credit offerings over the following few years.

The company was renamed Marks & Spencer Financial Services in 1988, and Marks & Spencer Unit Trust Management was established to provide unit trust funds the same year. In 1989, personal loans were introduced, followed by interest-free loans for M&S furniture purchases in 1991.

A rebranding as M&S Money took place in 2003 and the product range was expanded with the launch of the '&More' credit card. A combination of new customers and conversion of former Chargecard holders secured a base of 2.1 million cardholders by the end of March 2004, making the company a top ten credit card issuer within the UK.

During 2004, as part of an effort to reduce costs and return money to shareholders, Marks & Spencer reached an agreement to sell the company to HSBC for £580 million. Under the terms of the sale, it was agreed that M&S and HSBC would share profits from M&S Money until at least 2019 with subsequent renewals committing to maintain the partnership until at least 2031.

In 2019, the bank began its sponsorship of the M&S Bank Arena, a major events venue in nearby Liverpool.

M&S Bank was reported as having between 3 and 4 million customers in early 2021.

The business of M&S Bank was legally transferred from Marks & Spencer Financial Services plc to HSBC UK Bank plc on 1 June 2026, following the approval of a banking business transfer scheme by the High Court of Justice. HSBC now refers to M&S Bank as a division of HSBC UK, and intends to continue the use of the M&S Bank trading name for the transferred business.

== Products and services ==
M&S Bank provides a range of financial services to personal customers. Many have features designed to appeal specifically to Marks & Spencer customers.

Products are sold and serviced primarily online and by telephone, with additional marketing activity carried out through Marks & Spencer's stores and website. The bank also operated a small number of in-store branches between 2012 and 2021.

=== Credit Cards ===
M&S Bank entered the credit card market in 2003 and offers various Mastercard-branded cards. Cards feature an 'M&S Points' loyalty scheme which rewards spending with Marks & Spencer vouchers and offers. An additional 'Club Rewards' option gives extra loyalty points and vouchers in return for a monthly membership fee, along with additional benefits when shopping at Marks & Spencer such as discount vouchers and in-store hot drinks.

In spring 2024, it was disclosed that M&S Bank had two million credit card holders and that these customers' spending made up 16% of Marks & Spencer's turnover.

=== Loans ===
Personal loans were introduced in 1989 and amounts of between £1,000 and £30,000 are available with repayment periods of 12 to 84 months. As at 31 December 2024, the total value of current loans to customers stood at £1.38bn.

== Former products ==
=== Store cards ===
The bank's first products were the Budgetcard and Chargecard store cards. These allowed customers to make 'buy now, pay later' purchases in Marks & Spencer stores, which did not accept mainstream credit cards until April 2000. Chargecard received 270,000 applications within three weeks of its launch in 1985 and by 1999 was claimed to be the country's biggest store card scheme with over 6 million cardholders.

From October 2003 onwards, around 2.6 million customers were offered a new Mastercard credit card to replace their existing Chargecard, leading to 1.7 million customers migrating to the new product. The Budgetcard was removed from sale for new customers in 2005 and the Chargecard in 2011, followed by a final withdrawal and closure of both products in 2024.

=== Bureaux de change ===
Marks & Spencer's in-store bureaux de change and travel money services were previously managed by M&S Bank. This included around 100 bureaux staffed by Marks & Spencer colleagues and a Click & Collect money service allowing Euros and US Dollars to be ordered online and collected from most other Marks & Spencer stores. In spring 2025, these services were taken over by a division of Eurochange.

=== Current accounts ===
A paid-for Premium Current Account featuring benefits tailored to regular Marks & Spencer customers was launched during 2012, followed in 2014 by a standard current account offering the typical free in-credit banking commonplace in the UK.

On 4 March 2021, M&S Bank announced that it would discontinue its current account sales and close all current accounts by August 2021. Press reports suggested that only 150,000 of the bank's customers were current account holders and that the company intended to focus instead on core products such as credit cards and loans, along with new digital payment solutions.

=== Insurance ===
The bank sold insurance products underwritten by various providers including:

- Home insurance - Aviva
- Car insurance - BISL
- Travel insurance - Aviva
- Pet insurance - RSA

By mid-2026, all insurance products had been withdrawn from sale for new customers. Various insurance products are now sold directly from the Marks & Spencer website instead.

=== Mortgages ===
A range of mortgages was introduced in 2018, but signup of new customers ceased in 2020 as part of the bank's response to the COVID-19 pandemic, and there are no plans to re-enter the market.

=== Sparks Pay ===
Launched in the autumn of 2022, Sparks Pay was a dedicated credit product for Marks & Spencer customers. It offered instant credit of up to £500 to spend at M&S online or in-store, with up to 45 days interest free. Access to the product was paused during 2025 and remaining accounts started being closed in January 2026.
