= Richard Greenbury =

English businessman

Richard Greenbury

Sir Richard Greenbury (31 July 1936 – 27 September 2017) was an English businessman, and chairman and chief executive of the British retailer Marks and Spencer from 1988 to 1999. During his tenure, the company continued to grow until its profits peaked in 1997 and 1998 when it was the second most profitable retailer in the world after Wal-Mart, and the ninth largest company in Britain. After resigning as executive chairman, he was succeeded by Peter Salsbury.

== Early life ==
Sir Richard was born in Carlisle in 1936, living in Leeds for six years before the family moved to West London. Although academically able, at over six-foot Greenbury's real enthusiasm lay in playing sport, which he excelled at. He played football for his school's 1st XI, and later at county level, while playing tennis as well.

However, after his mother contracted cancer, Greenbury felt obliged to leave school with only six O-levels and abandon sport. Just before his seventeenth birthday, Greenbury took a modest job at Lillywhites.

== Marks and Spencer ==
Greenbury's stay at Lillywhites was short-lived. He later accepted a management trainee position at Marks and Spencer, who fortunately did not require A-levels for their programme. His hard work was soon recognised by Simon, Lord Marks, and he was taken under the wing of the founding father's son. Marks moved Greenbury to head office as a trainee merchandiser and personal assistant to his son in law.

It was in men's knitwear where Greenbury made his name in the early 1960s, shortly after his marriage to first wife Siân Hughes in 1959. Spotting the trend towards casual menswear, Greenbury formed a friendship with Harry Djanogoly, who ran the knitwear company Nottingham Manufacturing, and transformed the then unknown aisle in every Marks and Spencer store into a profits power house for the company. This reputedly got Djanogoly his knighthood and Greenbury his promotion.

By 1972, Greenbury had been made the youngest director in the company's history. At the age of forty-one, he was made a managing director, and by 1978 he had worked in every area of the business, including food and property. In 1984, shortly after becoming chairman, Derek Rayner decided it was time to outline his immediate successor, and, in 1988, Greenbury took his place as chief executive. In 1991, he was promoted again, becoming executive chairman, in keeping with Marks and Spencer's business traditions.

Despite later criticism, when the company smashed the £1 billion profit barrier in 1997, the City sang Greenbury's praises; although the impact of his tenure became the subject of intrigue in the aftermath of the downturn. For every year that Greenbury was in charge, Marks and Spencer held more than twice the clothing market of any other high street name, and even after the crash, and Greenbury's departure, they remained the only retailer holding over 10% of the market.

His management style was described as "autocratic" and "abrasive"; "many people would go so far as to call him a bully".

In 1997, Greenbury received an honorary doctorate from Heriot-Watt University.

=== The Greenbury Committee ===
In 1995, Greenbury led a CBI committee which made recommendations on executive remuneration. The Greenbury Report, as it was widely known, has had longstanding implications for the method and scale of remuneration policy in UK PLCs. The committee included other senior industrialists, such as Denys Henderson, Iain Vallance, Baron Vallance of Tummel and Michael R. Angus.

=== New leadership ===
In 1999, Greenbury's career as a CEO and chairman came to an end. He was criticised as he stood down. Despite this, Greenbury talked openly about the problems with the leadership succession that ultimately caused a slump at the retailer, as the four possible candidates for the job engaged in a bitter power struggled that stimulated headlines such as "Sparks Fly at Marks", in a Channel 4 documentary. The downturn in Marks and Spencer's fortunes has also been attributed to, in part, the Littlewoods acquisition, which reportedly cost several million pounds. In an interview with the Guardian in August 2000 he admitted that his last year in charge of Britain's biggest retailer was "disastrous".

Greenbury went on to be a director with ICI, Zeneca, C&G, Game, British Gas, Lloyds TSB, and a member of the supervisory board at Philips. He retired in 2010. Though his tenure has been remembered for the downturn in profits and share prices that followed his departure, it was under Greenbury that Marks and Spencer undertook its greatest international expansion, had the greatest number of employees, stores and floor space, and the highest share prices, share of the market, and pre- and post-tax profits of any retailer in Europe; and, excluding companies operating under multiple names, the world.
