= Derek Rayner, Baron Rayner =

English businessman

The Right Honourable The Lord Rayner
- Born: 30 March 1926; Norwich, Norfolk, England
- Died: 26 June 1998 (aged 72); Surrey, England
- Occupation: Businessman
- Title: Chairman, Marks & Spencer
- Term: 1984-1991

Derek George Rayner, Baron Rayner (30 March 1926 – 26 June 1998) was an English businessman, who was chairman and chief executive of Marks & Spencer, and revived and rapidly expanded the company in the 1980s. He began working for M&S in 1953 as a management trainee and became the first chief executive outside the founding families of the company.

== Personal life ==
Rayner was born in 1926, the son of George and Hilda Rayner. He was educated at City College, Norwich and Selwyn College, Cambridge, where he read theology. From 1946 to 1948 he completed his National Service duty in the Royal Air Force. He remained a bachelor throughout his life, with no known dependents.

== Career ==
=== Marks & Spencer ===
Rayner began working for M&S as a management trainee in 1953 at the company's store in Oxford when the company's then chairman, Lord Marcus Sieff, asked his advice about a problem. He rose rapidly in the company's management and became a director in 1967.

By the 1980s the company's trademark, "St. Michael", was outdated and the company sales of clothing and household goods went into decline. Rayner restored the company by holding down costs and encouraging enterprise by employees. He also introduced strict financial controls, refurbishment of the larger stores and additional expansion. In 1988 under his control the company bought the Brooks Brothers clothing company of Canada for $750m, introduced a store charge card and opened more British stores.

=== Government ===
His tight financial controls and strong management practices at M&S led to him working for the British Government headed by Edward Heath, serving in a variety of posts. From 1970 to 1973 he arranged for the three British military services to use a single procurement office, the MoD Procurement Executive.

He also advised Margaret Thatcher on improving Government efficiency, including reducing the number of meetings officials held.

He returned to M&S in 1982. In 1984, he became the first person from outside the founding families to become chief executive.

== Honours ==
In 1973 he was knighted for his government work and on 3 February 1983 he was created a life peer as Baron Rayner, of Crowborough in the County of East Sussex.

Business positions
Preceded by	Joint Managing Director of Marks & Spencer; 1973–1991	Succeeded by Sir Richard Greenbury
Preceded by	Chairman of Marks & Spencer; 1984–1991	Succeeded by Sir Richard Greenbury
