= Jeroen van Wijngaarden =

Dutch politician

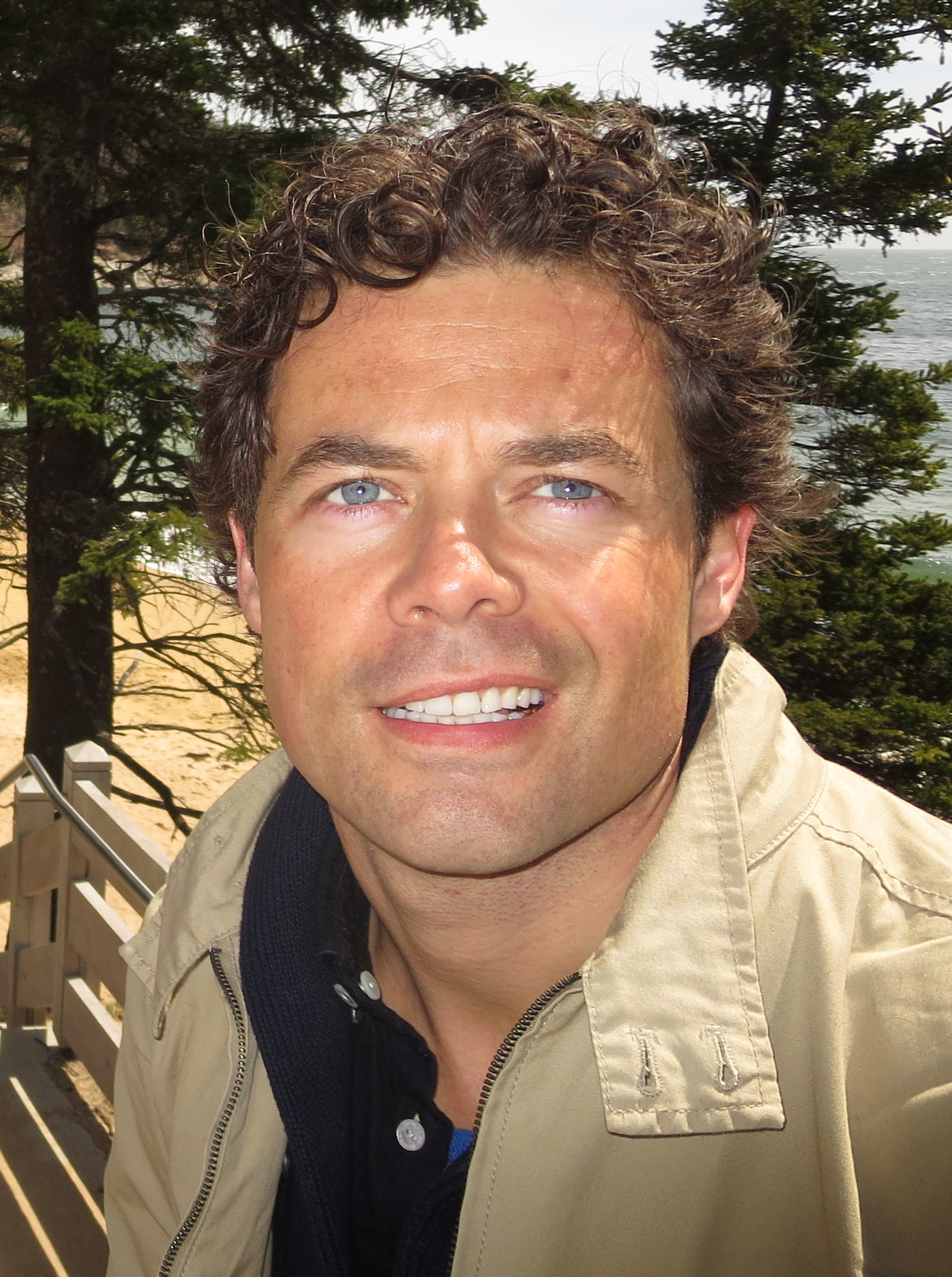

Member of the House of Representatives
- In office 20 February 2019 – 26 October 2023
- In office 1 July 2014 – 23 March 2017

Personal details
- Born: 29 March 1978 (age 48) Amsterdam, Netherlands
- Party: People's Party for Freedom and Democracy
- Education: Hotelschool The Hague; Cardiff University; University of Amsterdam

Jeroen van Wijngaarden (born 29 March 1978) is a Dutch politician who has served as a member of the House of Representatives between 2014-2017 and 2019-2023. He is a member of the People's Party for Freedom and Democracy (VVD).

== Early life and career ==
Van Wijngaarden was born on 29 March 1978 in Amsterdam. He studied change and personnel management at the Hotelschool The Hague between 1996 and 2000. He studied journalism, media and culture for one year at Cardiff University between 2002 and 2003. This was followed up by a study of Dutch law at the University of Amsterdam from 2006 to 2011. Van Wijngaarden worked in communication and public affairs for several years, including as manager at PricewaterhouseCoopers between 2011 and 2014.

== Political career ==
=== Career in local politics ===
Van Wijngaarden served as member of the borough council of Amsterdam-Zuid from May 2007 until April 2014, including four years as party group leader.

=== Member of the House of Representatives ===
On 1 July 2014 Van Wijngaarden became member of the House of Representatives for the first time when he replaced Cora van Nieuwenhuizen, who became Member of the European Parliament. His term in the House ended after the 2017 general election.

Van Wijngaarden was re-admitted as member on 20 February 2019 when he succeeded Foort van Oosten, who resigned to assume the mayorship of Nissewaard.

In addition to his committee assignments, Van Wijngaarden has been a member of the Dutch delegation to the Parliamentary Assembly of the Council of Europe (PACE) since 2022. In the Assembly, he serves on the Committee on Political Affairs and Democracy.

== Electoral history ==
Electoral history of Jeroen van Wijngaarden
Year	Body	Party	Pos.	Votes	Result		Ref.
Year	Body	Party	Pos.	Votes	Party seats	Individual	Ref.
2021	House of Representatives	People's Party for Freedom and Democracy	23	879	34	Won	
