= Katie Bickerstaffe =

British businesswoman

Katie Bickerstaffe is the former co-CEO of Marks & Spencer, working alongside the CEO Stuart Machin.

In March 2022, it was announced that Machin and Bickerstaffe would succeed Steve Rowe as the leaders of M&S. On 25 May 2022, Machin became CEO, while Bickerstaffe became co-CEO.

In July 2024, Bickerstaffe left M&S having announced her intention to retire from the company in March.
