= Marc Bolland =

Dutch businessman (born 1959)

- Born: 28 March 1959 (age 67); Apeldoorn, Amsterdam, Netherlands
- Education: University of Groningen
- Occupation: Businessman
- Years active: 1987–present
- Title: COO of Heineken (2005–2006); CEO of Morrisons (2006–2009); CEO of Marks & Spencer (2010–2016); Senior Managing Director of Blackstone (2016-2021); Chairman of Blackstone Group International Partners (2020-2024)

Marc Bolland (born 28 March 1959) is a Dutch businessman, who was the CEO of Marks & Spencer, after having been CEO of UK supermarket company Morrisons.

== Biography ==
=== Early life ===
He received a bachelor's degree from the Hotelschool The Hague, and then an MBA at the University of Groningen.

=== Heineken ===
He began as a graduate at Amsterdam-based Heineken International NV, the third largest brewer in the world, in 1987. Bolland worked in various international management positions in Africa and Central Europe before joining the Heineken board in 2001. He became chief operating officer in 2005. Bolland has been credited with both building and rolling out the Heineken brand internationally.

=== Morrisons ===
In September 2006, he was appointed CEO of the UK supermarket chain Morrisons. Morrisons had acquired Safeway in 2004 creating a 130,000 people strong retail conglomerate in the UK. The merger initially proved unsuccessful. Bolland joined after five profit warnings with a brief to turn round the company.

By 2008, Morrisons had achieved strong growth in both market share and profits, and in 2008, Bolland was announced as The Times' "Businessman of the year". Under his guidance, Morrisons "...gained significant market share from rivals".

=== Marks & Spencer ===
In November 2009, it was announced that Bolland would become CEO of Marks & Spencer Group PLC. In May 2010, he took over from the then chairman and CEO Sir Stuart Rose. Bolland launched a plan to grow M&S into an international multi-channel retailer. The Evening Standard named Bolland as one of "London's 1000 most influential people" for 2010.

During September 2011, he announced a new look store environment for M&S's UK stores, with a plan to complete the roll out to the entire UK estate by mid-2013. In 2011, M&S returned to France after a 10-year absence and also started the development of a new digital platform that was launched in February 2014.

In 2011, Bolland received an honorary doctorate from York St John University.

In January 2016, it was announced that Bolland would be retiring as CEO of Marks and Spencer effective April 2016, and would be replaced by Steve Rowe.

=== Blackstone ===
In September 2016, Bolland joined Blackstone as Senior Managing Director and Head of European Portfolio Operations for its Private Equity business. He subsequently was appointed Chairman of Blackstone Group International Partners (BGIP) in 2020 before he stepped down in January 2024 to dedicate more time to Unicef and The Learning Passport.

=== Founder of Charitable Innovations : Movement to Work and The Learning Passport ===
In 2012, Bolland founded “Movement to Work” in response to the Croydon riots. The Charity was set up to give disadvantaged young people (with disabilities, no education, ex-offenders etc) an opportunity of a work placement and work. Bolland set up the Charity’s structure and was Chairman for 5 years. Since 2013 Movement to Work has delivered 225,000 work placements to the unemployed with over 89% resulting in full time employment or education.

In 2016, during the Syria crisis, Bolland in his role as Vice President UNICEF UK visited refugee camps in Jordan to better understand the delivery of education to refugees. Subsequent to the visit, Bolland developed an innovative digital education concept for refugee children, and children with limited access to education, to which he brought UNICEF and Cambridge University. The concept has been further developed in partnership with Microsoft, and has become “The Learning Passport” (of which Bolland is Founder Chairman). The Learning Passport was nominated as one of the top 100 innovations of 2021 by Time Magazine and as of March 2025 was used across 47 countries and by more than 10 million children.

== Other activities ==
- Royal Collection Trust, Deputy Chairman (since 2016)
- The Coca-Cola Company, Member of the Board of Directors (2015-2024)
- Exor, Non-Executive Member of the Board of Directors (2016-2025)
- IAG (International Airlines Group), Non-Executive Member of the Board of Directors (2016-2020)
- Polymateria, Board member (since 2020)
- Vice President UNICEF UK (since 2010)

UK Government, DFID Lead non-executive director 2018-2020

Business positions
Preceded by Sir Ken Morrison	CEO of Morrisons; 2006–2009	Succeeded by Ian Gibson (temporary)
Preceded by Sir Stuart Rose	CEO of Marks & Spencer; 2010–2016	Succeeded by Steve Rowe
