= Baron Marks of Broughton =

Title in the Peerage of the United Kingdom

Baron Marks of Broughton, of Sunningdale in the Royal County of Berkshire, is a title in the Peerage of the United Kingdom. It was created on 10 July 1961 for Simon Marks. He was chairman and managing director of the retail chain Marks & Spencer, a company co-founded by his father Michael Marks. As of 2010 the title is held by his grandson, the third Baron, who succeeded his father in 1998.

== Barons Marks of Broughton (1961) ==
- Simon Marks, 1st Baron Marks of Broughton (1888–1964)
- Michael Marks, 2nd Baron Marks of Broughton (1920–1998)
- Simon Richard Marks, 3rd Baron Marks of Broughton (b. 1950)

The heir apparent and sole heir to the peerage is the present holder's son Hon. Michael Marks (b. 1989).

== Coat of arms ==
Coat of arms of Baron Marks of Broughton
Notes Coat of arms of Baron Marks of Broughton family Coronet A coronet of a Baron Crest A Dove wings addorsed Argent beaked and membered Gules gorged with an Antique Crown and to the beak a Gimmel Ring Escutcheon Pily Argent and Azure a Pair of Scales Or Supporters On either side a Lion Or supporting a Cornucopia Argent the Fruit proper that on the dexter holding aloft with the interior forepaw a Red Rose slipped and leaved also proper and that on the sinister holding aloft with the interior forepaw two Triangles interlaced Or Motto Strive Probe Apply
