= St Michael (brand) =

Clothing brand owned by Marks & Spencer

- Product type: Marks & Spencer brand
- Introduced: 1927
- Discontinued: 2000

St Michael was a brand owned and used by British retailer Marks & Spencer between 1927 and 2000.

== History ==
In 1875, the firm of N. Corah and Sons of Leicester registered "St Margaret" as a brand name for their hosiery products. The name originated because their factory, which became one of the largest hosiery factories in Europe, was in the parish of St Margaret's Church, Leicester. In 1926, Corahs entered into an agreement to supply Marks & Spencer directly rather than through a wholesaler, and this had the potential to bring them into conflict with the Wholesale Textile Association. In order to protect their other distribution channels, Corahs sought to develop an alternative brand name for their goods sold through Marks & Spencer. The name agreed to by Simon Marks was St Michael, possibly after his father and co-founder of Marks & Spencer, Michael Marks, because it could be linked in the public mind with the St Margaret brand which had a reputation for quality.

The name was introduced in 1927 and registered as a trademark in 1928. At first it applied only to products produced by Corahs, but by 1950 and for the next fifty years, almost all goods sold by Marks & Spencer used the St Michael brand.

The brand was dropped in 2000 as part of a general rebranding. For the next few years, the St Michael name was adopted as the 'St Michael Quality Promise' on the back of food products, on the side of delivery vehicles and on in-store receipts.

In September 2021, Marks & Spencer announced they would begin selling clothes using the brand again, after it gained popularity on vintage clothing resale websites.

== See also ==
- List of Marks & Spencer brands
