= Stuart Machin =

British businessman, CEO of Marks & Spencer

- Born: 1970 (age 55–56)
- Title: Chief Executive, Marks & Spencer
- Term: May 2022 - present
- Predecessor: Steve Rowe
- Board member of: Ocado Retail Limited

Stuart Machin (/ˈmeɪtʃɪn/; born 1970) is a British business executive and the chief executive of Marks & Spencer, a position he has held since 25 May 2022.

== Education ==
In 2013, he attended the part time 3 month Harvard Business School advanced management program (AMP).

== Career ==
Machin started his career in retailing as a teenage shelf stacker at a Sainsbury's Savacentre in Hempstead Valley Shopping Centre outside Gillingham, Kent. Machin joined the retail management scheme at Sainsbury's when he was 18.

He worked for Sainsbury's, Tesco and Asda in increasingly senior roles, followed by ten years in Australia working for the Wesfarmers conglomerate as operations director of Coles and managing director of Target Australia. He resigned as managing director of Target in April 2016 because of accounting irregularities that he was unaware of but "happened on [his] watch". He then became the chief executive of Steinhoff UK, a division of Steinhoff International (now Ibex Topco B.V.)

=== Marks & Spencer ===
Machin joined M&S as managing director in the company's food division in May 2018.

In February 2019, M&S announced it was paying £750 million for a 50 per cent stake in a joint venture called Ocado Retail Limited, replacing Ocado's previous retail partner Waitrose, which was already operating its own standalone food delivery proposition. As part of the deal, Machin became a non-executive director of the new joint venture.

In May 2021, Machin was given the additional role of joint chief operating officer, alongside Katie Bickerstaffe. This saw Machin assume responsibility for HR, IT, Property & Store Development, and Central & Store Operations, in addition to his role as managing director.

In March 2022, it was announced that Machin would succeed Steve Rowe as chief executive of the company, while Bickerstaffe would become co-chief executive reporting to Machin. Machin assumed his new role on 25 May 2022 and joined the board. In July 2024, Bickerstaffe stepped down from her role.

In May 2022, Machin launched "Straight to Stuart", a scheme that allows staff to share views and ideas with him for improving the company. As of January 2024, the scheme had generated over 15,000 suggestions from colleagues, including from bowel cancer survivor Cara Hoofe whose idea for the inclusion of bowel cancer symptoms on toilet roll packaging and in-store toilets was implemented across all M&S stores.

In August 2022, Machin said that London's Oxford Street was in danger of becoming a "dinosaur district destined for extinction", and has been vocal in support of the controversial planned demolition and redevelopment of M&S's flagship store there, close to Marble Arch.

Machin has advocated for reforms to the apprenticeship levy, arguing that its current structure hindered M&S's ability to train more young individuals. He oversaw the re-launch of management trainee schemes for school leavers and graduates at M&S in 2023. Under Machin’s leadership, the company returned to the FTSE100 in August 2023 and restored its dividend for shareholders in 2024.

In May 2025, it was reported Machin earned £7.1 million in 2024-25, which included £4.6 million of performance-related bonuses, a £1.6 million bonus linked to company's performance that year and around £894,000 of fixed pay and pensions benefits.

== Personal life ==
Machin lives in south London, and his hobbies are music, theatre, politics, food, fashion, and walking his dog, Kostas.
