= Marks & Spencer =

British multinational department store company

Marks & Spencer p.l.c.
- Type: Public limited company
- Traded as: LSE: MKS; FTSE 100 component
- ISIN: US57069PAD42
- Industry: Retail
- Founded: 1884; 142 years ago Leeds, West Riding of Yorkshire, England
- Founders: Michael Marks; Thomas Spencer
- Headquarters: London
- Number of locations: 1,463 (2019)
- Area served: Worldwide
- Key people: Archie Norman (Chairman); Stuart Machin (Chief Executive)
- Brands: Autograph; Blue Harbour; Boutique; Goodmove; Jaeger; M&S Bank (Note: Owned by HSBC UK); M&S Collection; M&S Food; Per Una; Rosie
- Revenue: ▲£17,273.6 million (2026)
- Operating income: ▼£536.7 million (2026)
- Net income: ▼£236.2 million (2026)
- Number of employees: 63,000 (2026)
- Parent: Marks and Spencer Group P.L.C. (2016–present)
- Website: marksandspencer.ie

Marks and Spencer p.l.c. (abbreviated to M&S and colloquially known as Marks & Sparks or Marks) is a major British multinational retailer based in London, England, that specialises in selling clothing, beauty products, home products and food products. It is listed on the London Stock Exchange (LSE) and is a constituent of the FTSE 100 Index.

M&S was founded in 1884 by Michael Marks and Thomas Spencer in Leeds. Through its television advertising it asserts the exclusive nature and luxury of its food and beverages. It also offers an online food delivery service through a joint venture with Ocado. In 1980, M&S became the first British supermarket chain to sell packaged sandwiches.

In 1998, M&S became the first British retailer to make a pre-tax profit of more than £1 billion, although it then went into a sudden slump, taking the company and its stakeholders by surprise. In November 2008, the company began to sell branded goods such as Kellogg's corn flakes. In November 2009, it was announced that Marc Bolland, formerly of Morrisons, would take over as chief executive from executive chairman Sir Stuart Rose. In the early 21st century, clothing sales fell, while food sales increased, after M&S dropped its traditional St. Michael brand.

On 22 May 2018, M&S announced that it would close more than 100 stores by 2022 in a "radical" plan. It cut 7,000 jobs in 2020, owing to the COVID-19 pandemic. In May 2021, M&S announced plans to close another 30 shops over the next 10 years as part of its turnaround plan. In its 2024 results, the company stated that it was aiming at reducing locations to 180 full-line and 420 food stores in the UK, saying legacy stores were more expensive to operate.

== History ==
=== Establishment ===
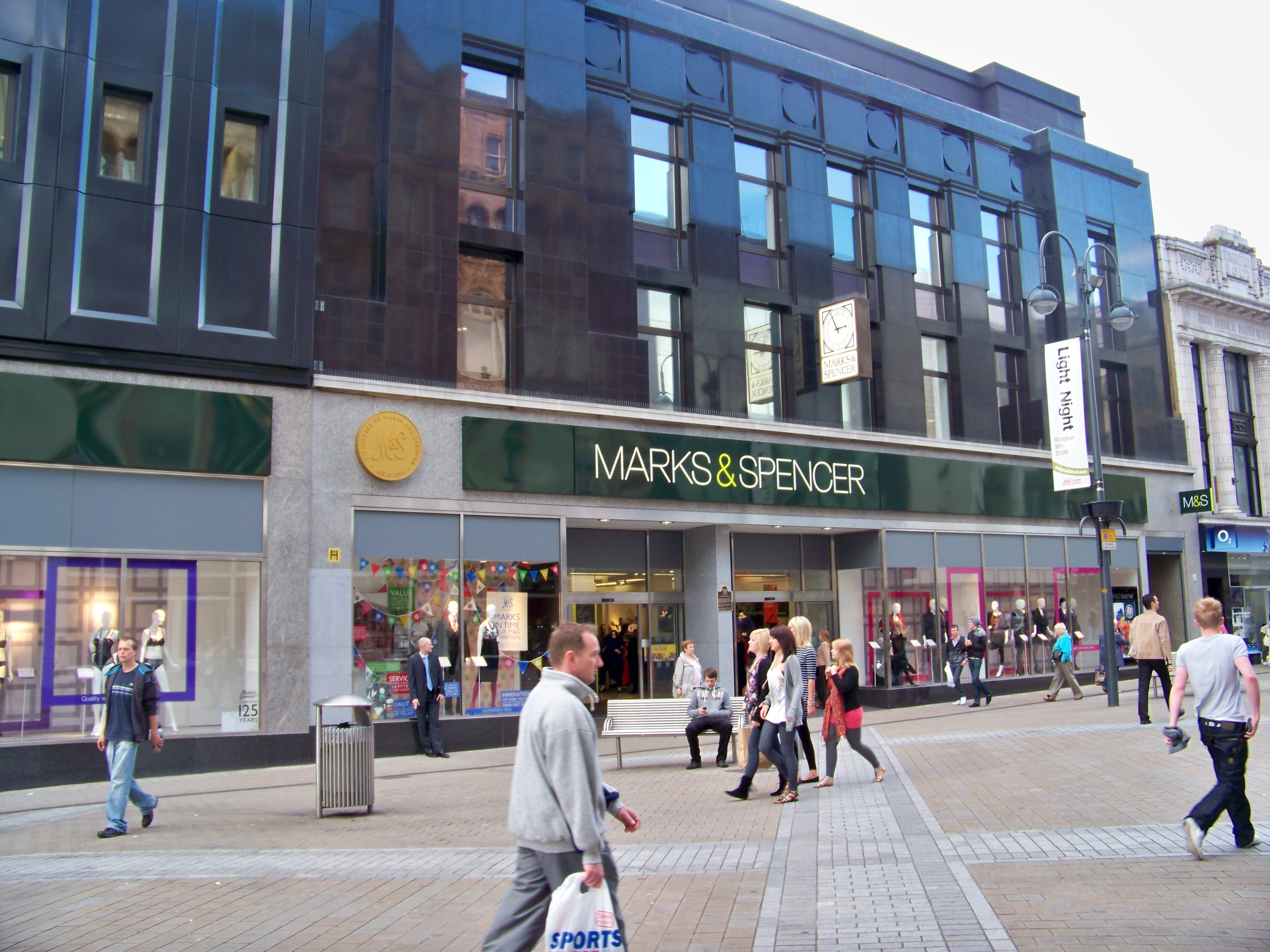
Marks & Spencer on Briggate, not far from its original branch in Leeds

Marks & Spencer was founded as a partnership between Michael Marks, a Polish Jew born in Slonim (now Belarus), who had migrated to Leeds, England, in the early 1880s, and Thomas Spencer, a cashier from the English market town of Skipton in North Yorkshire. Marks worked for a company in Leeds called Barran, which employed Jewish migrants (see Sir John Barran, 1st Baronet). In 1884, he met Isaac Jowitt Dewhirst while looking for work. Dewhirst lent Marks £5 (equivalent to £695 in 2024), which he used to establish his penny bazaar on Kirkgate Market in Leeds.

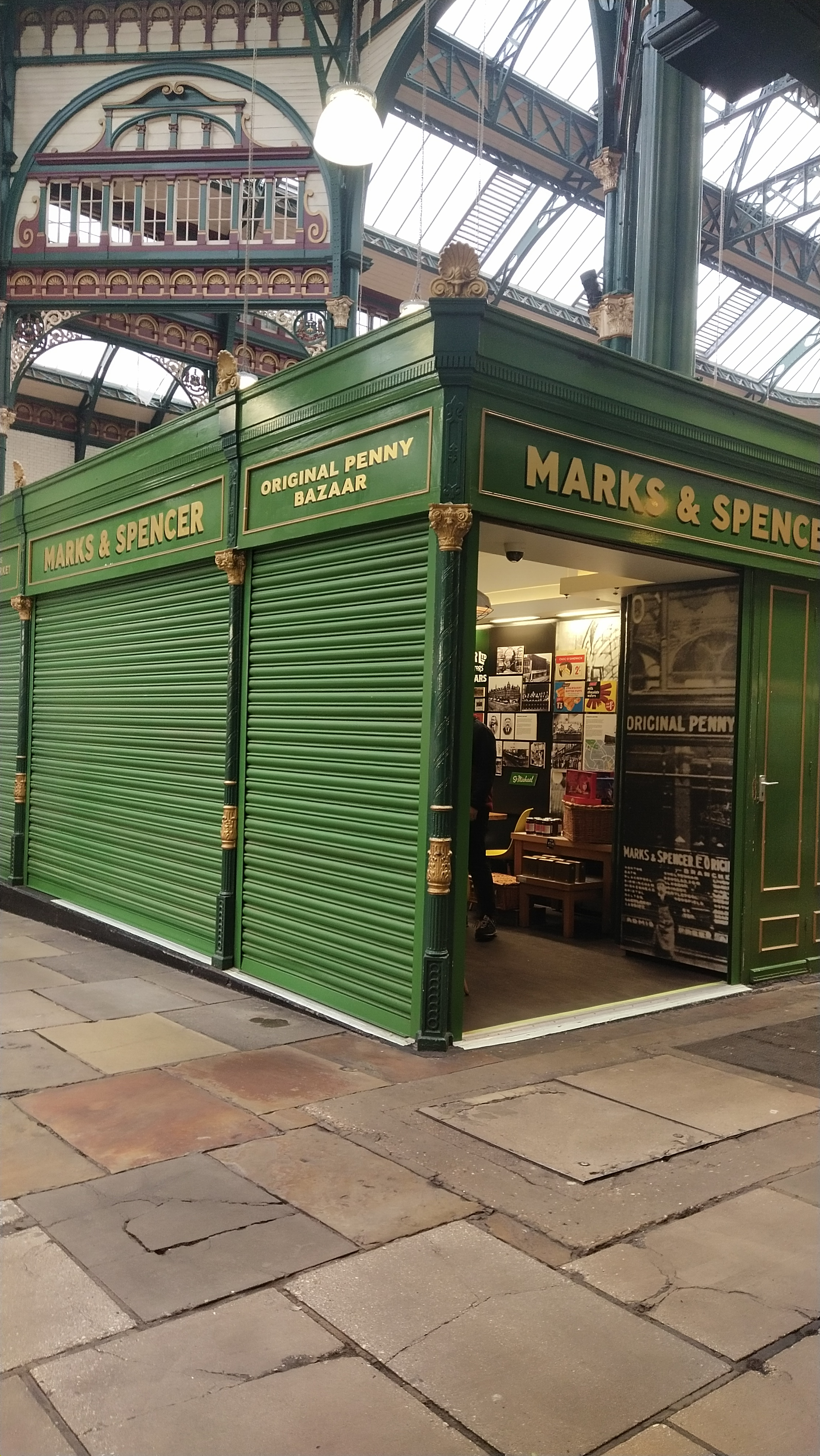
The original penny bazaar set up by Marks & Spencer is still in operation in Leeds Kirkgate Market.

Dewhirst also taught him a little English. Dewhirst's cashier was Thomas Spencer, a bookkeeper, whose second wife, Agnes, helped improve Marks's English. In 1894, when Marks acquired a permanent stall in the Leeds covered market, he invited Spencer to become his partner.

In 1901, Marks moved to the Birkenhead open market in North West England, amalgamating his business with Spencer's. In 1903, the two men were allocated stall numbers 11 and 12 in the centre aisle; there they opened the penny bazaar. The company left Birkenhead Market on 24 February 1923.

The next few years saw Michael Marks and Thomas Spencer move the original Leeds penny bazaar to 20, Cheetham Hill Road, Manchester, and they also opened market stalls in many locations around the North West of England. Spencer died in 1905, and Marks in 1907; Michael Marks's son Simon became chairman in 1916. Under Simon Marks, the company acquired other chains of penny bazaars, growing into a retail empire.

=== Domestic growth ===
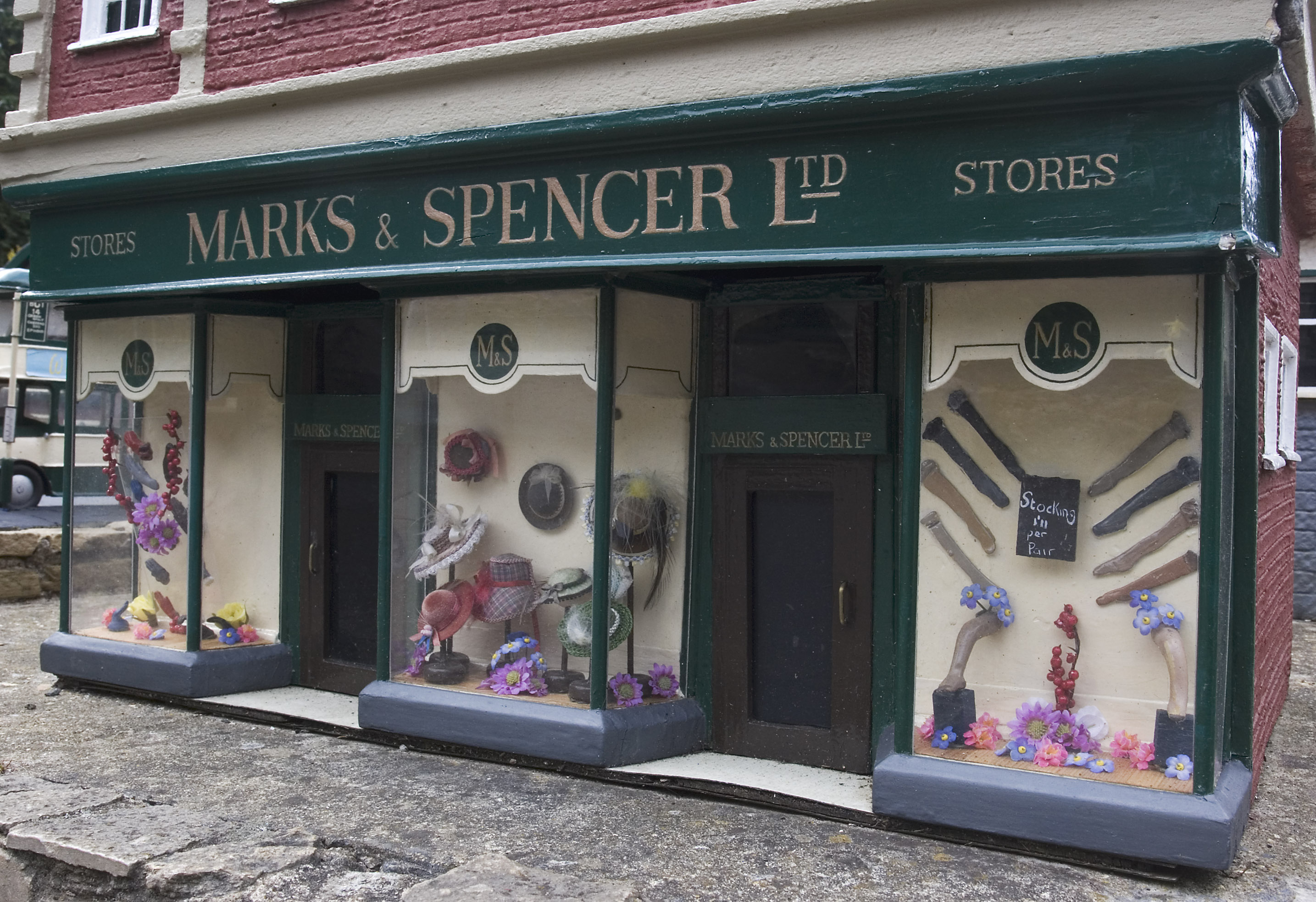
Representation of historic store from the 1930s, Bekonscot model village, UK

Textiles were first sold in 1926, and food began to be sold from 1931. Marks and Spencer, known colloquially as "Marks and Sparks", or "M&S", made its reputation until the 1990s with a policy of selling 99% British-made goods. It entered into long-term relationships with British manufacturers, and sold clothes under the "St Michael" brand, after Michael Marks, which was introduced in 1928, and extended to food in 1941, replacing all other brands by 1956. It also accepted the return of unwanted items, giving a full cash refund if the receipt was shown, no matter how long ago the product was purchased, which was unusual for the time.

During the Second World War in 1941, M&S staff raised £5,000 to pay for a Supermarine Spitfire fighter aircraft called The Marksman. By 1950, virtually all goods were sold under the "St Michael" label. M&S lingerie, women's clothes and girls' school uniform were branded under the "St Margaret" label until the whole range of general merchandise became "St Michael". Simon Marks died in 1964, after fifty-six years' service. Israel Sieff, the son-in-law of Michael Marks, took over as chairman and in 1968 John Salisse became a company director. A cautious international expansion began with the introduction of Asian food in 1974. M&S opened stores in continental Europe in 1975 and in Ireland four years later.

The company put its main emphasis on quality, including a 1957 stocking size measuring system. In 1948, it established a Food Technology department. Staff in the canteens and cafeterias had hygiene training by the mid-1950s. For most of its history, it also had a reputation for offering fair value for money. When this reputation began to waver, it encountered serious difficulties. Arguably, M&S has historically been an iconic retailer of 'British Quality Goods'.

The uncompromising attitude towards customer relations was summarised by the 1953 slogan: "The customer is always and completely right!" Smoking was banned as a fire hazard from all M&S shops in 1959. Energy efficiency was improved by the addition of thermostatically controlled refrigerators in 1963.

M&S began selling Christmas cakes and Christmas puddings in 1958. In an effort to improve the quality of their Swiss rolls, they hired the food expert Nat Goldberg, who made a major improvement across their entire cake range, which had lost the public's favour a few years earlier. As a later measure to improve food quality, food labelling was improved and "sell by dates" were phased in between 1970 and 1972. The Popular Front for the Liberation of Palestine bombed the Oxford Street store of Marks & Spencer in London on 18 July 1969.

=== International expansion ===
In 1972, Marcus Sieff became chairman, remaining in place until 1984, and emphasising the importance of good staff relations to the tradition of the store while extending staff benefits to areas such as restaurants and chiropody.

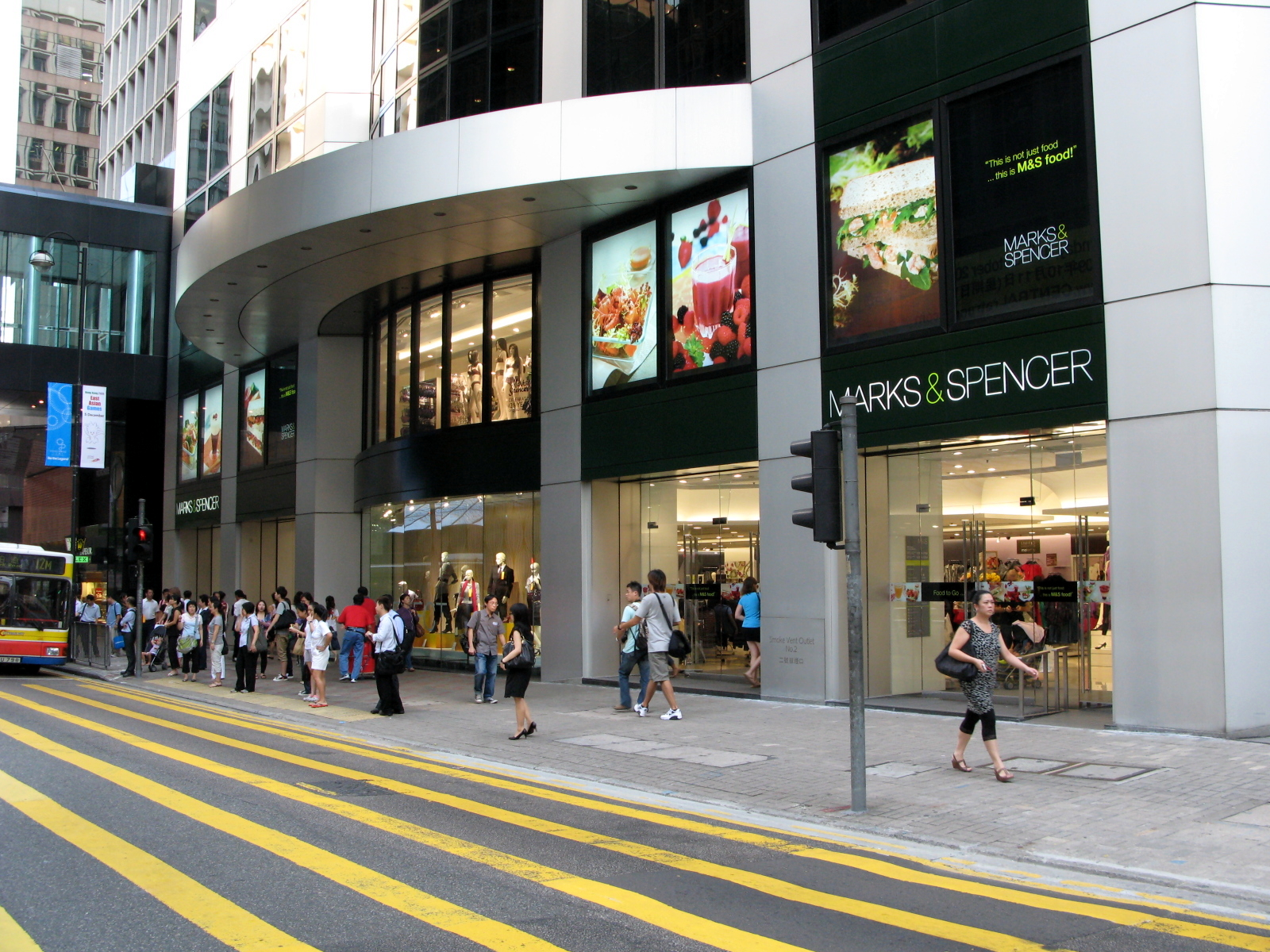
A Marks & Spencer store in Central, Hong Kong

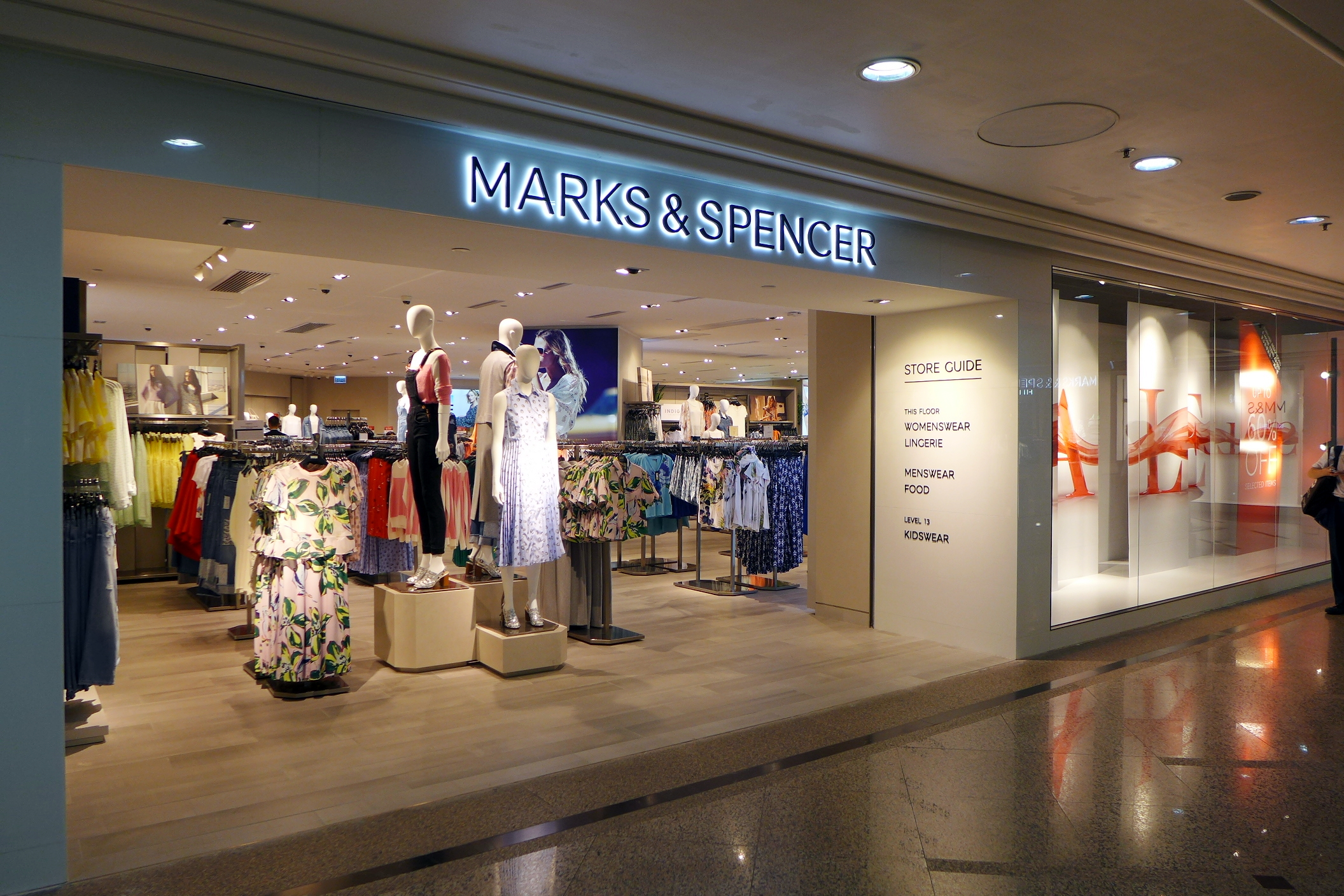
A Marks & Spencer store in Times Square, Causeway Bay, Hong Kong

Marks & Spencer expanded into Canada in 1973, and at one point had 47 stores. Despite efforts to improve its image, the chain was never able to move beyond its reputation there as a stodgy retailer, one that catered primarily to senior citizens and expatriate Britons. The shops in Canada were smaller than British outlets, and did not carry the same selection. In the late 1990s, further efforts were made to modernise them and also expand the customer base. Unprofitable locations were closed. Nevertheless, the Canadian operations continued to lose money, and the last 38 shops in Canada were closed in 1999.

Expansion into France began with shops opening in Paris at Boulevard Haussmann and Lyon in 1975, followed by a second Paris shop at Rosny 2 in 1977. Further expansion into other French and Belgian cities followed into the 1980s. Although the Paris shops remained popular and profitable, the Western European operation as a whole did not fare as well and 18 shops were sold in 2001. In April 2011, M&S changed direction again, with a plan to reopen a store that would sell food as well as clothing. In addition, the group opened several food outlets throughout Paris. The first branch opened on 24 November 2011, on the Champs-Élysées in a ceremony attended by the company's CEO Marc Bolland, the model Rosie Huntington-Whiteley, and the British Ambassador to France, Sir Peter Westmacott.

In early 1980, Marks & Spencer became the first British supermarket chain to sell packaged sandwiches, beginning with five shops. Demand was so high that M&S enlisted suppliers to industrialise the process, and other supermarkets followed. By 1990, the British sandwich industry was worth £1 billion. In 1988, Marks & Spencer acquired Brooks Brothers, an American clothing company, and Kings Food Markets, a US food chain.

=== 21st century ===
==== Financial decline ====
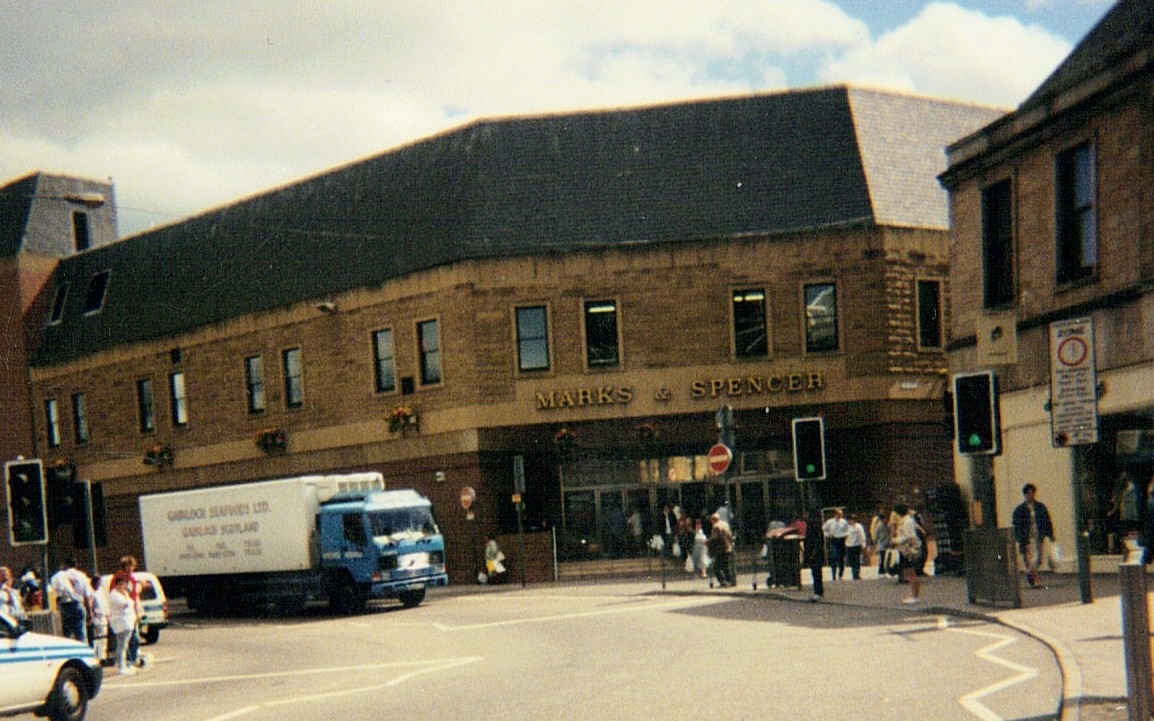
M&S shop in Inverness in 1998

M&S's profits peaked in the financial year 1997–1998. At the time, it was seen as a continuing success story, but with hindsight it is considered that during Sir Richard Greenbury's tenure as head of the company, profit margins were pushed to untenable levels, and the loyalty of its customers was seriously eroded. Another factor was the company's refusal until 2001 to accept any credit cards except its own chargecard. These factors combined to send M&S into a sudden slump: its profits fell from more than a billion pounds in 1997 and 1998, to £145 million in the year ended 31 March 2001.

In 2002, with changes in its business focus such as accepting credit cards, the introduction of the "Per Una" clothing range designed by George Davies, and a redesign of its underlying business model, profits recovered somewhat. In 2004, M&S was in the throes of an attempted takeover by Arcadia Group and BHS boss, Philip Green. On 12 July, a recovery plan was announced that would involve selling off its financial services business M&S Money to HSBC Bank, buying control of the Per Una range, closing the Gateshead Lifestore and stopping the expansion of its Simply Food line of shops. Philip Green withdrew his takeover bid after failing to get sufficient backing from shareholders.

In February 2007, M&S announced the opening of the world's largest M&S shop outside the UK at Dubai Festival City. On 2 October 2008, M&S opened its first mainland China shop, which is in Shanghai. Problems with the supply chain for the first few months of opening led Stuart Rose, M&S chairman, to describe failures in "basic shopkeeping".

==== Restructuring ====
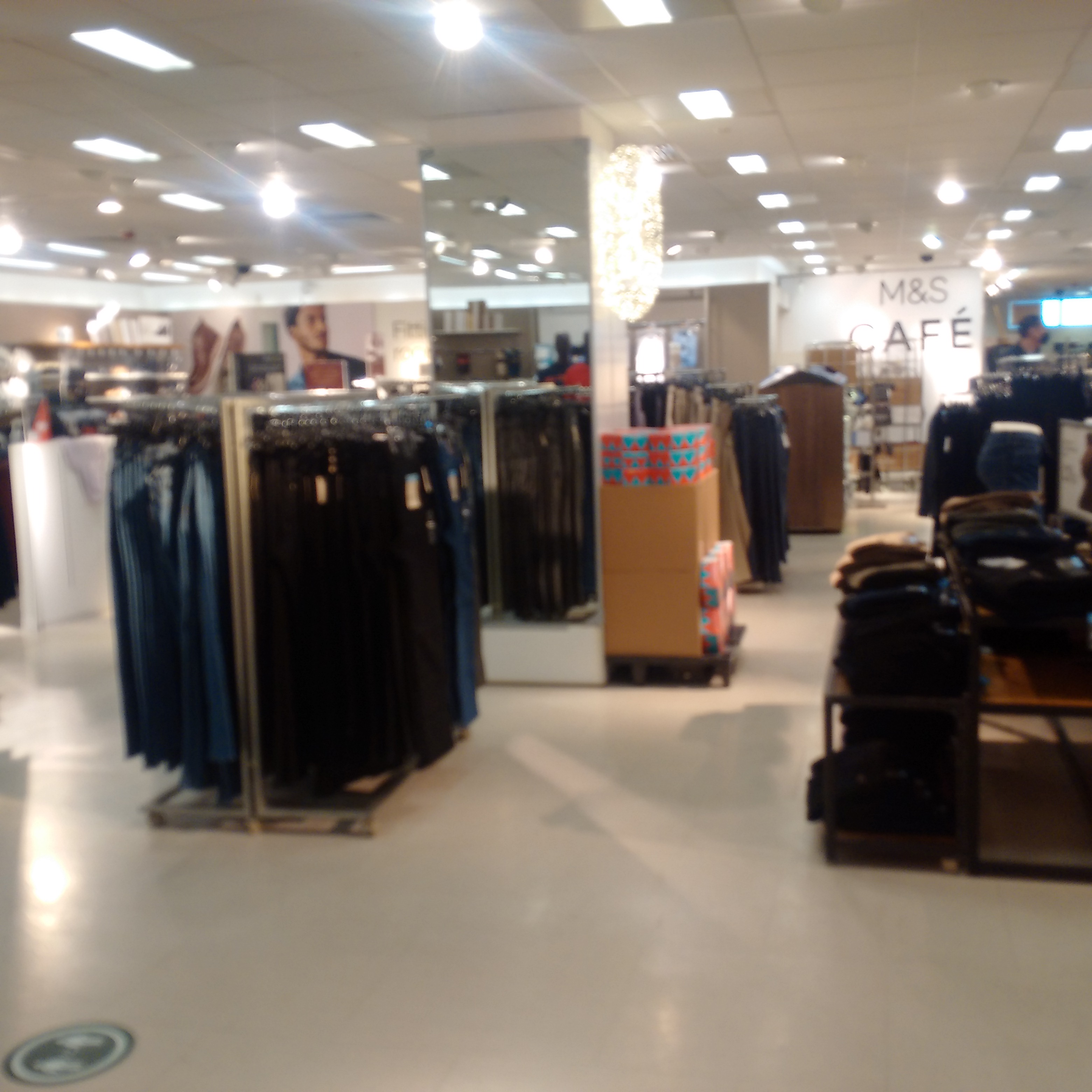
The interior of a branch in Wakefield, West Yorkshire in 2020

Twenty-two unprofitable and minor food stores, including branches in Ripon and Balham, were closed in early 2009 as part of a cost-cutting measure. In August 2010, it was confirmed that the Grantham branch of M&S would close, along with two other Lincolnshire branches in Skegness and Scunthorpe, owing to low sales in these older format stores. These decisions met with protests from the local communities and petitions were signed in support of retaining the stores, although the closures went ahead.

The Retail Knowledge Bank conducted an audit of the company's brands in August 2010, and revealed that sales of womenswear were at a 10-year low. Drapers magazine claimed that Per Una was the only clothing brand not at risk of being axed while Marc Bolland, the chief executive, considered which brands would be retained.

In October 2010, chairman Sir Stuart Rose was a signatory of a letter to The Daily Telegraph stating that "The private sector should be more than capable of generating additional jobs to replace those lost in the public sector, and the redeployment of people to more productive activities will improve economic performance, so generating more employment opportunities", despite recent job cuts of 1,000 staff.

On 9 November 2010, Bolland revealed plans to strengthen the company's overall brand image and targeting sales of between £800 million and £1 billion for which company will increase capital expenditure to £850 million to £900 million over the next three years to fund the plans. The plan also involved the discontinuation of its 'Portfolio' fashion brand and the sale of electrical products. The company announced a new marketing strapline, 'Only at M&S', and that it would revamp its website. Bolland ordered a new store design in May 2011, and it was announced that the company would spend around £600 million between 2011 and 2014 on its UK stores.

In May 2013, some Marks & Spencer customers claimed that the chain's contactless payment terminals had taken money from cards other than the ones intended for payment. Contactless cards are supposed to be within about 4 cm of the front of the terminal to work. M&S investigated the incident and confirmed the new system had been extensively tested and was robust. It had rolled out the contactless payments system, provided by Visa Europe, to 644 UK stores.

In May 2013, the Best of British range was launched along with an overhaul of Per Una and Indigo. Patrick Bousquet-Chavanne became the marketing director, succeeding Steven Sharp in July. Bolland vowed to bring "quality and style back". In November 2013, it was revealed that Bill Adderley, founder of homeware chain Dunelm Group, had built a £250 million stake in M&S over the past 18 months. This disclosure was made under stock market rules which require any holding larger than a 3 per cent share to be made public.

In December 2013, Marks & Spencer announced that Muslim checkout staff in the UK could refuse to sell pork products or alcohol to customers at their till. The policy was announced after at least one news outlet reported that customers waiting with goods that included pork or alcohol were refused service, and were told by a Muslim checkout worker to wait until another till became available. The policy applied across all 703 UK M&S stores and prompted a strong backlash by customers. A company spokesman subsequently apologised and stated that they will attempt to reassign staff whose beliefs may impact their work to different departments, such as clothing.

On 7 January 2016, it was announced that Marc Bolland, who had been CEO since 2010, would step down on 2 April 2016, and be replaced by Steve Rowe, head of clothing, and previously head of the food business. In 2018, Stuart Machin was appointed managing director of Food to lead the transformation of the food business. On 28 June 2024, the company announced that it would be launching a new service for clothing repairs and alterations in partnership with the Sojo company.

In September 2018, television presenter and model Holly Willoughby became the company's new brand ambassador along with her 'Must Have' collection which launched on 27 September 2018. However, the company failed to order sufficient stock and many customers were left disappointed.

Marks & Spencer introduced a hijab in its school uniforms range in late 2018 and subsequently faced a backlash and boycott from some customers; the product is stocked for girls as young as three.

==== Store culls, developments and openings ====
Some 30 stores were identified for closure in 2015–2016. Several smaller stores were identified for closure in November 2017. On 31 January 2018, another 14 stores were identified for closure in April 2018, and eight other stores were earmarked for closure later, pending consultation. On 23 May 2018, M&S managers confirmed that an additional 14 shops were to be closed and another 86 were under investigation, and thus put on notice, because of falling corporate sales and customer footfall. This took the total to more than 100 stores closing by 2022, On 15 January 2019, the company named the next 17 stores to be closed. In May 2021, the company announced plans to close another 30 shops over the next 10 years as part of its turnaround plan, and in September 2021 it was confirmed that half of the French stores had been closed due to supply chain issues arising from Brexit.

In March 2021, M&S announced it intended to redevelop its largest store, the Marble Arch branch on Oxford Street in London, replacing it with a 10-storey building with two-and-a-half floors of shop space below several floors of offices. Despite protests from groups including Save Britain's Heritage, The Twentieth Century Society and Create Streets, the plans were approved by Westminster City Council in November 2021, and Mayor of London Sadiq Khan chose not to intervene. However, in April 2022, Communities Secretary Michael Gove blocked the plans to allow time for the Department for Levelling Up, Housing and Communities to review the proposed redevelopment. In June 2022, Gove ordered a public enquiry into the plans; M&S said it was "bewildered" by his "baseless" decision. A two-week planning enquiry, starting in October 2022, looked at whether the project complied with planning rules concerning heritage and the historic environment and also address environmental concerns, notably the release of almost 40,000 tonnes of embodied carbon into the atmosphere caused by the construction of the replacement structure.

In July 2023, Gove rejected the plans to demolish and redevelop the Oxford Street store, stating it conflicted with policies on heritage and design, and involved significant embodied carbon impact and waste. As well as overruling Westminster City Council and the Mayor of London, Gove also overruled his planning inspector, David Nicholson, who had recommended the project should go ahead due to its importance to the viability of the Oxford Street area. M&S CEO Stuart Machin called the decision "utterly pathetic" and a "shortsighted act of self-sabotage". M&S subsequently launched a legal challenge against Gove's decision. In November 2023, the High Court allowed M&S to proceed with a judicial review, and after a two-day hearing on 13–14 February 2024, Gove's decision to block demolition was quashed by a High Court judge on 1 March 2024. In December 2024, Gove's successor Angela Rayner approved the store's demolition, citing the advantages of a concentrated development in a highly accessible location, the employment and regeneration benefits, and "potential harm to the vitality and viability" of London's West End if permission had been refused.

In its results for the 52 weeks ending on 30 March 2024, the company stated that it was aiming at having 180 full-line and 420 food stores in the UK, commenting that legacy stores were more expensive to operate. In 2025, Marks and Spencer opened a new store in Bristol's Cabot Circus shopping centre, nearly four years after a store in Bristol closed. This was one of 16 new stores opening across the UK in that financial year, as part of a £300 million investment.

==== New management ====
In May 2021, Machin's remit had expanded as he was appointed joint Chief Operating Officer taking oversight responsibility for Store and Central Operations, Property, Store Development, Technology, People and the Island of Ireland whilst remaining the Food Managing Director. In March 2022, it was announced that chief executive (CEO) Steve Rowe would step down after six years in role. Rowe stayed on as an advisor before officially leaving the company in July 2022. Machin was announced as his successor as CEO, with Katie Bickerstaffe assisting as co-CEO.

==== Animal welfare ====
In July 2022, secret cameras at an intensive dairy farm in North Yorkshire that supplied milk and cheese to M&S, Ocado, Asda and Morrisons captured lame animals "unable to get up to reach water" as some workers killed goats "of no value" at the intensive farm. Animals were seen with overgrown hooves and piles of dead goats were observed outside the property. A spokesperson for the British Retail Consortium said: "Our members take their responsibilities to animal welfare very seriously and will investigate these claims. Swift action will be taken against any breaches to the high animal welfare standards our members uphold." Marks & Spencer is a member of the RSPCA Assured food labelling scheme that states "any animals involved in a product's production have been reared to the RSPCA's strict farm animal welfare standards". The scheme has been subject to controversy due to animal abuse being captured by hidden cameras at some farms, with the RSPCA president calling it "utterly indefensible".

In May 2024, animal welfare activists released footage that was filmed at several intensive RSPCA Assured farms that supplied meat to Marks & Spencer, Tesco and Asda. The footage showed sick, dying and dead hens alongside living ones. M&S suspended one of the farms. In September 2024, undercover footage was released from an RSPCA Assured farm which supplied milk to M&S. Workers were observed severely mistreating cows. M&S immediately suspended the farm from their supply chain when the footage was released. The RSPCA also suspended the farm. An M&S spokesperson said: "We take animal welfare extremely seriously and set rigorous standards for our suppliers."

Marks & Spencer, along with Waitrose and other supermarkets, has phased out the practice of eyestalk ablation in its shrimp supply chain. It has also committed to source only free-range eggs by the end of 2025. In 2024, it joined a letter by Compassion in World Farming and other major UK food companies calling on the government to ban the use of battery cages and colony cages for egg-laying hens.

==== Acquisitions and partnerships ====
In July 2022, the company agreed to buy the logistics firm Gist Limited for £145 million. In November 2022, it was reported that the company had acquired the intellectual property developed by collapsed fashion marketplace Thread, and hired some former Thread staff including co-founder Kieran O'Neill, with the aim of adding personalised recommendations to the M&S website.

In June 2018, M&S announced a strategic partnership with Microsoft to explore the integration of artificial intelligence (AI) technologies into its customer experience, stores, and wider operations.

==== 2025 cyber incident ====
In April 2025, M&S experienced difficulties with contactless payments and click-and-collect orders over the Easter weekend. On 23 April, Stuart Machin issued a statement confirming the business was dealing with a cyber incident. On 25 April, M&S stopped taking orders at its website. The attack was believed to be a ransomware attack, orchestrated by 'Scattered Spider' – a splinter group of Lapsus$ – a notorious hacking group responsible for high profile breaches at Transport for London (TfL) and MGM resorts. It appeared that the attacker employed a SIM swapping technique to gain unauthorised access to the network and compromise M&S's critical systems. The company said the breach occurred at a third-party service provider.

In May 2025, it was reported that M&S was preparing to make a claim under a cyber insurance policy to cover a wide range of losses, including but not restricted to Data Protection breaches and loss of online sales, which could total as much as £300 million. Allianz was reported to be the lead insurer, with other insurers including Beazley plc also being exposed. It was reported that the loss of profits would only be partly covered by any insurance pay-out. The incident reduced the company's market value by more than £1 billion as of 21 May 2025. On 10 June 2025, the company restored online ordering on its website. On 11 August 2025, M&S resumed its "click and collect" service following the outage caused by the incident. In October 2025, M&S announced that it had terminated its contract with its IT provider, Tata Consultancy Services.

==== Protests ====
Marks & Spencer has been repeatedly targeted and boycotted by anti-Israel protestors during the Arab League boycott of Israel. In August 2014, it was reported that the Marble Arch branch was picketed weekly by protesters objecting to the sale of Israeli goods.

== Corporate affairs ==
=== Head office locations ===
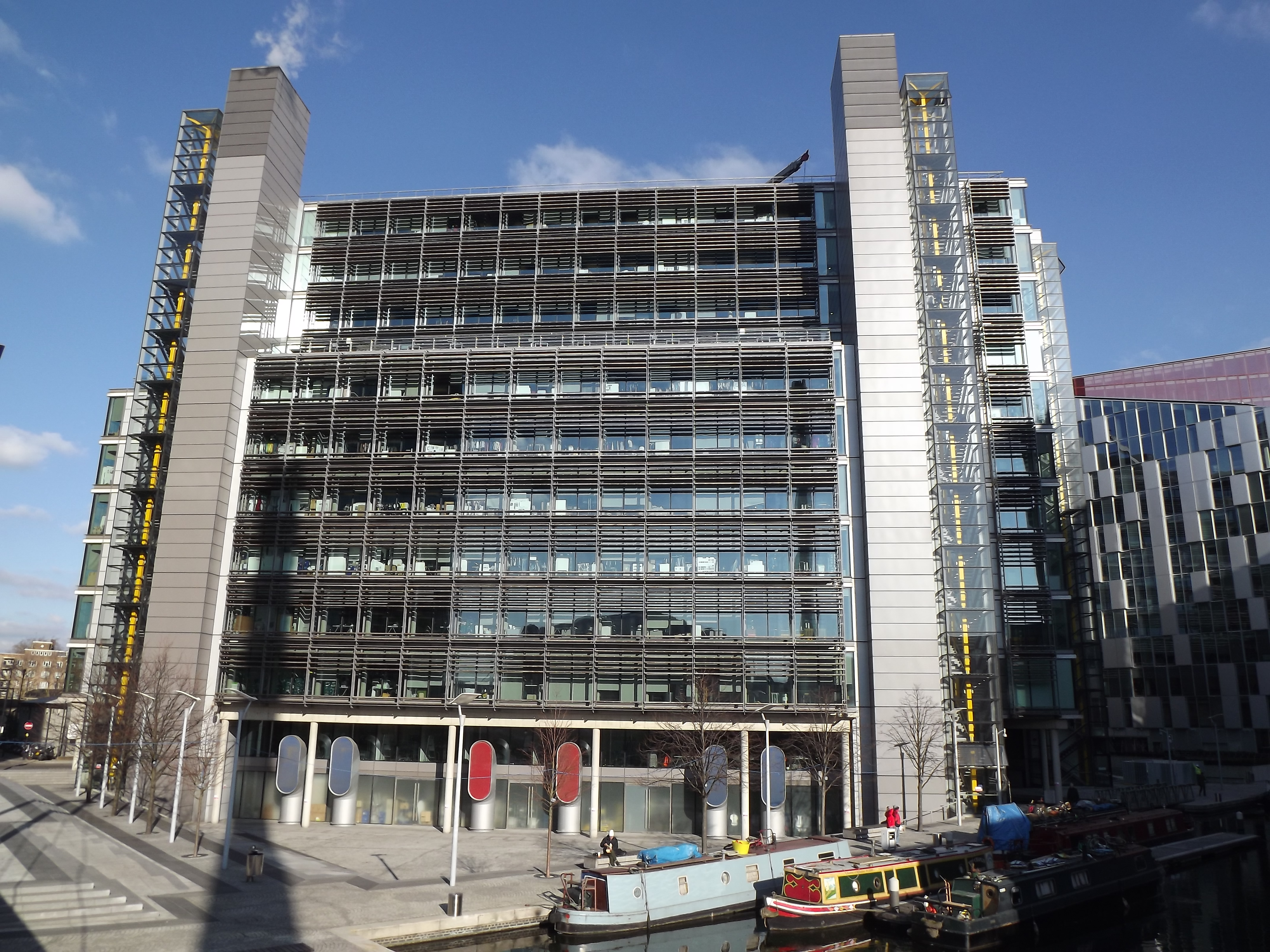
Waterside House, 35 North Wharf Road, London

The headquarters of M&S had been since 1957 at Michael House, 55 Baker Street, London. This had formerly been the Baker Street Bazaar which had been destroyed in a fire in 1940. The site was redeveloped by M&S, under the direction of the then Sir Simon Marks, as the company had outgrown its previous Bayswater HQ. In 2004, the company moved to a new headquarters designed by Mossessian & Partners at Waterside House, in Paddington Basin, London.

As well as the main offices in London, there are a number of other head office sites across the UK; Stockley Park (IT Services), Salford Quays (Marks & Spencer Shared Services Ltd. which provides human resources, and finance administration) and Chester (M&S Bank joint venture and Retail Customer Services).

The company has overseas sourcing offices in Malaysia, Hong Kong, Thailand, India, Bangladesh, Turkey, mainland China, Ireland, Italy, Indonesia, and Sri Lanka.

=== Financial performance ===
Financial performance has been as follows:

Until 1999 M&S's financial year ended on 31 March. Since then, the company has changed to reporting for 52- or 53-week periods, ending on variable dates.

Year ended	Turnover (£ M)	Profit before tax (£ M)	Net profit (£ M)	Basic eps (p)
28 March 2026	17,273.6	364.6	236.2	12.7
29 March 2025	13,816.8	511.8	291.9	14.6
30 March 2024	13,040.1	672.5	425.2	21.9
1 April 2023	11,931.3	475.7	364.5	18.5
2 April 2022	10,885.1	391.7	309.0	15.7
3 April 2021	9,155.7	(209.4)	(201.2)	(10.1)
28 March 2020	10,181.9	403.1	27.4	1.3
30 March 2019	10,377.3	523.2	37.3	2.1
31 March 2018	10,698.2	580.9	29.1	1.6
1 April 2017	10,622.0	613.8	115.7	7.2
2 April 2016	10,555.4	488.8	404.4	24.9
28 March 2015	10,311.4	600.0	481.7	29.7
29 March 2014	10,309.7	580.4	506.0	32.5
30 March 2013	10,026.8	564.3	458.0	29.2
31 March 2012	9,934.3	658.0	489.6	32.5
2 April 2011	9,740.3	780.6	598.6	38.8
3 April 2010	9,536.6	702.7	523.0	33.5
28 March 2009	9,062.1	706.2	506.8	32.3
29 March 2008	9,022.0	1,129.1	821.0	49.2
31 March 2007	8,588.1	936.7	659.9	39.1
1 April 2006	7,797.7	745.7	520.6	36.4
2 April 2005	7,490.5	505.1	355.0	29.1
3 April 2004	8,301.5	781.6	452.3	24.2
29 March 2003	8,019.1	677.5	480.5	20.7
30 March 2002	8,135.4	335.9	153.0	5.4
31 March 2001	8,075.7	145.5	2.8	0.0
1 April 2000	8,195.5	417.5	258.7	9.0
31 March 1999	8,224.0	546.1	372.1	13.0
31 March 1998	8,243.3	1,155.0	815.9	28.6
31 March 1997	7,841.9	1,129.1	746.6	26.7
31 March 1996	7,233.7	965.8	652.6	455.8

=== Senior management ===
The following have served as the chairman of the company since it was founded:

- 1884–1907: Michael Marks (set up first stall in Leeds in 1884)
- 1907–1916: William Chapman
- 1916–1964: Simon Marks (Lord Marks)
- 1964–1967: Israel Sieff (Lord Sieff)
- 1967–1972: Edward Sieff
- 1972–1984: Marcus Sieff (Lord Sieff)
- 1984–1991: Derek Rayner (Lord Rayner)
- 1991–1999: Sir Richard Greenbury
- 2000–2004: Luc Vandevelde
- 2004–2006: Paul Myners
- 2006–2009: Lord Burns
- 2009–2011: Sir Stuart Rose
- 2011–2017: Robert Swannell
- 2017–present: Archie Norman

The following have served as chief executives of the company since it was founded:

- 1967–1983: Marcus Sieff (Lord Sieff)
- 1973–1991: Derek Rayner (Lord Rayner)
- 1988–1999: Sir Richard Greenbury
- 1999–2000: Peter Salsbury
- 2000–2004: Luc Vandevelde
- 2001–2004: Roger Holmes
- 2004–2010: Sir Stuart Rose
- 2010–2016: Marc Bolland
- 2016–2022: Steve Rowe
- 2022–present: Stuart Machin

=== Archives ===
The M&S company archive is held in the Michael Marks Building at the University of Leeds. The archive has permanent museum-style displays and hosts temporary exhibitions.

== Stores ==
=== Great Britain ===
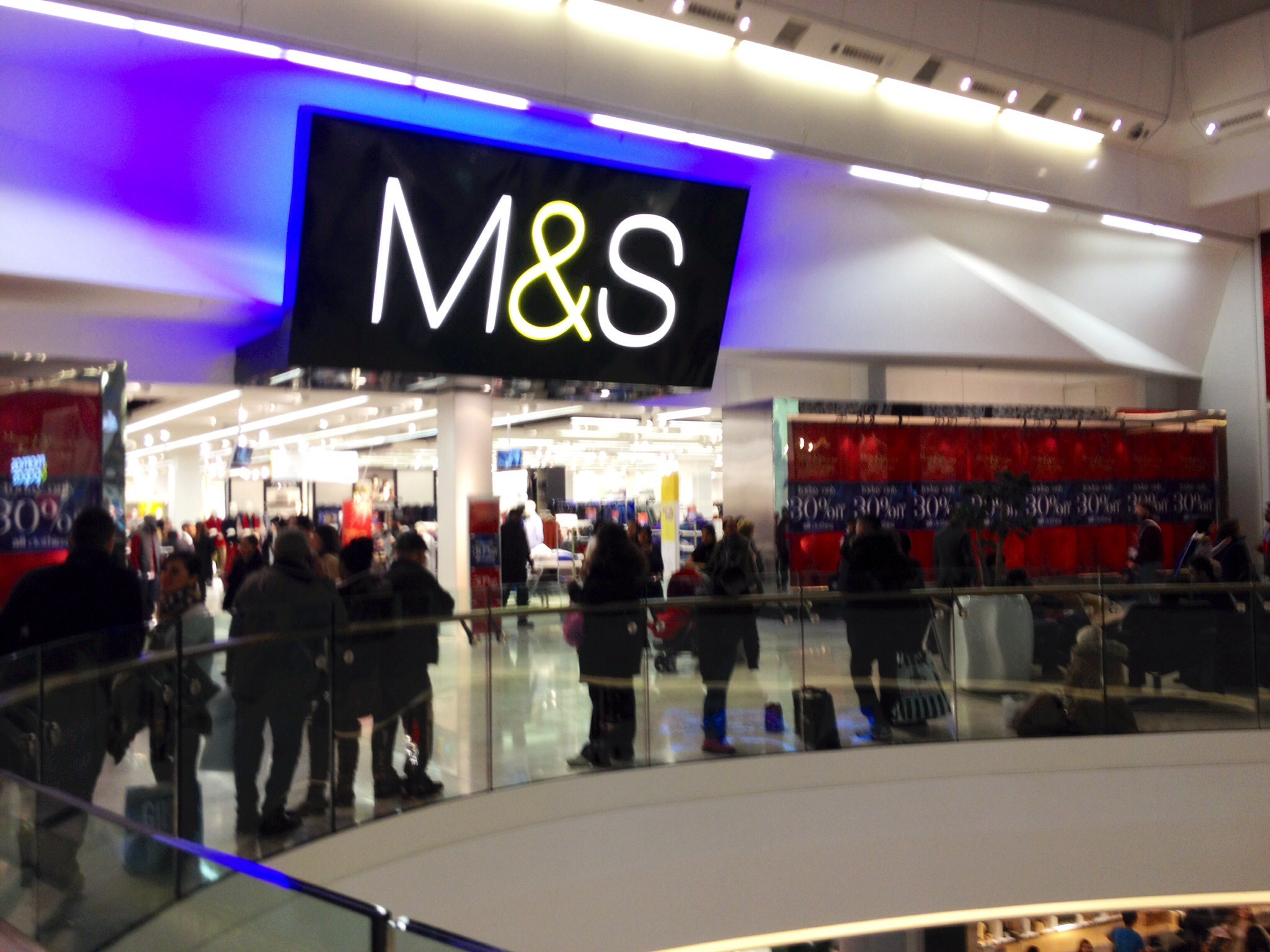
M&S White City in Westfield London (2014), one of the company's largest stores

The largest shop is near Marble Arch, on Oxford Street in London, which has around 16,000 square metres (170,000 sq ft) of shop floor (as noted above, a proposed redevelopment of this store was blocked in April 2022, and then successfully appealed in February 2024). The second largest is in Cheshire Oaks, Ellesmere Port, which is the largest store outside of London. The third largest shop is at the Gemini Retail Park in Warrington. In 1999, M&S opened its shop in Manchester's Exchange Square, which was destroyed in the 1996 Manchester bombing and rebuilt. At re-opening, it was the largest M&S shop with 23,000 m^{2} (250,000 sq ft) of retail space, but half was subsequently sold to Selfridges, the company's second site in Manchester. The smallest branch is a "Marks & Spencer Penny Bazaar" clearance outlet located in the Grainger Market in Newcastle upon Tyne.

M&S has opened a number of stores at out-of-town sites since a trend to build shopping centres away from town centres began in the 1980s. The first was at the MetroCentre, Gateshead, Tyne and Wear, which opened in 1986. Another notable example is the store at the Merry Hill Shopping Centre at Brierley Hill, West Midlands. This store opened in October 1990 shortly after the closure of stores in the nearby town centres of Dudley and West Bromwich; the Merry Hill store was not originally intended to replace these two town centre stores, but both the Dudley and West Bromwich stores had experienced a downturn in trade as the opening of the Merry Hill store loomed, and both stores were closed in August 1990.

=== Ireland ===
Marks and Spencer opened its first shop on the island of Ireland in 1979. It operates its Irish business on an all-island basis, with Eddie Murphy as country director and Laura Harper as trading director for the island of Ireland. Its main competitor in the grocery, drapery and homewares markets in Ireland is Dunnes Stores.

By June 2022, Marks and Spencer had 38 shops across the island of Ireland.

Following the United Kingdom's departure from the European Union and the consequent additional burden of importing goods from Great Britain into Ireland, the Irish division began sourcing some products (particularly short shelf-life products) within the island of Ireland. In June 2022, it was announced that the business was to begin sourcing its sandwiches for sale in Ireland from Around Noon, based in County Down, and in May 2025, it was announced that the business was to begin sourcing its parsnips for sale in Ireland from Gilfresh Produce, based in County Armagh. It also began importing some products directly from suppliers in continental Europe rather than bringing them via Great Britain as it had done previously.

In 2023, Marks and Spencer entered into a partnership with the Applegreen petrol station chain to stock Marks and Spencer products in a number of Applegreen's 200 forecourt shops across the island of Ireland. It began rolling out the concept in 2024. By October 2025, the business had a presence in 30 Applegreen shops across the island of Ireland, with a plan to increase that number to 41 by the end of 2025 and to 60 in the medium term.

=== Mainland Europe ===
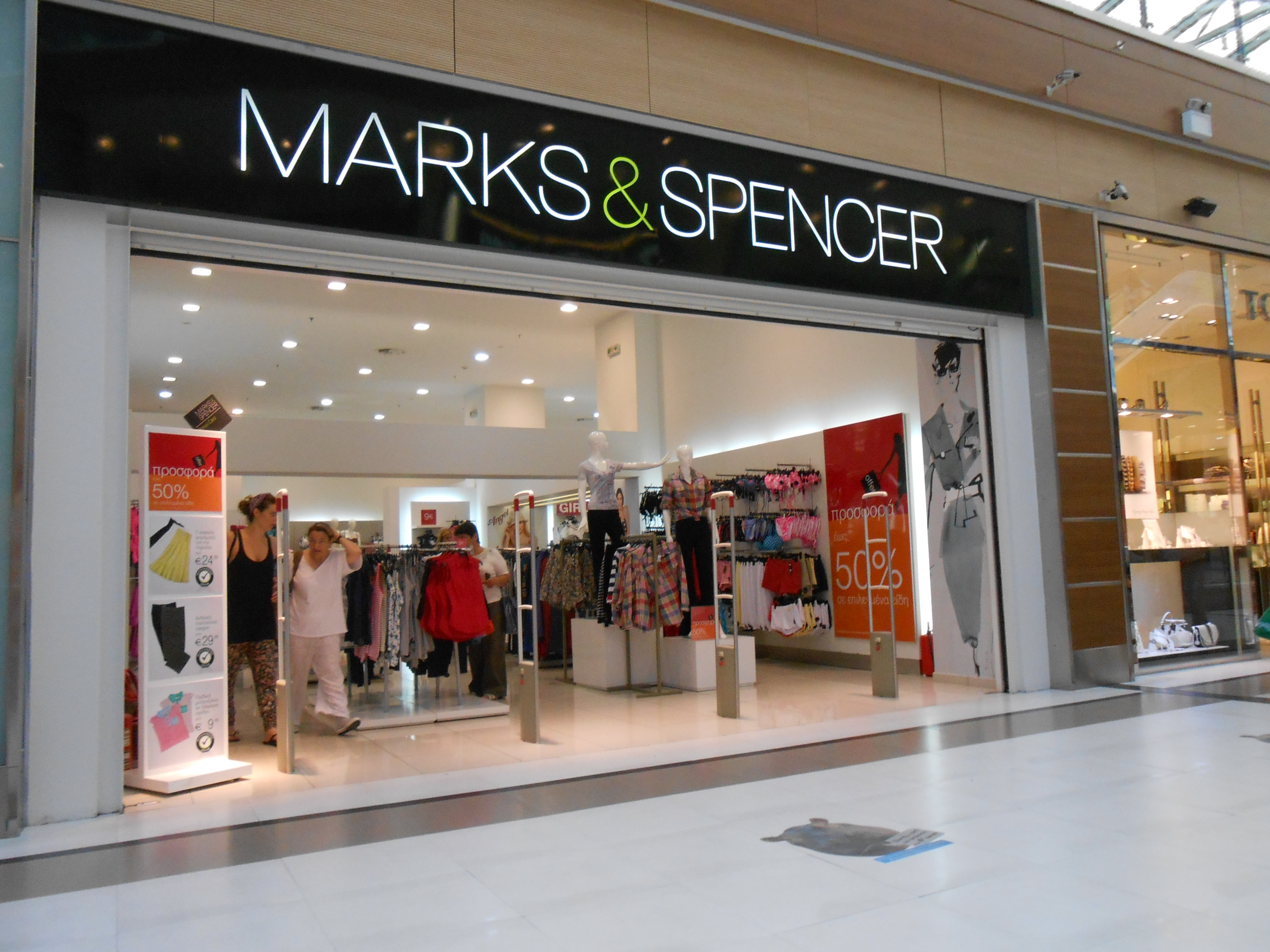
A Marks & Spencer branch in Athens, Greece

The company reopened its store in Paris on 24 November 2011, following the launch of a new French website on 11 October 2011. A new store opened on 17 April 2013 in Kalverstraat in Amsterdam, Netherlands, more than 10 years after closure of the previous store. On 17 September 2013, the British ambassador to the Netherlands, Sir Geoffrey Adams, opened the first Dutch Marks & Spencer Food pilot store at a BP petrol station in Bijleveld beside the A12 motorway. There are more than 300 stores in some 40 overseas locations.

In the Netherlands, as of 2015, M&S had a supermarket in the expensive Kalverstraat shopping street in Amsterdam, as well as a larger store including clothing in The Hague. A number of BP petrol stations in the Western area of the Netherlands included M&S convenience food stores. In 2016, M&S was due to open a much larger store in Amsterdam, with a direct underground link to a new metro station. However, in November 2016, the company announced that they would be closing all of their stores on the European mainland, something that did not actually happen. Nevertheless, they closed both of their stores in the Netherlands.

Marks & Spencer owns 51 stores in Turkey as of 2022. Fiba Retail is the sole agent authorised to open Marks & Spencer stores in Turkey and Ukraine region.

In September 2021, M&S confirmed the closure of 11 stores in France and ended its partnership with SFH, saying it was "near impossible for us to serve fresh and chilled products to customers" following the UK's exit from the European Union. The company would still operate nine smaller stores in or near major travel hubs.

=== Asia ===
In the Philippines, the Rustan Group of Companies serves as the official franchise partner through its subsidiary, Stores Specialists Inc. (SSI). In February 2026, Marks & Spencer announced that it would transition to a new franchisee in the Philippines, with its contract with SSI set to end in May 2026. On 8 June 2026, Marks & Spencer signed a new franchise agreement with PT Mitra Adiperkasa Tbk in the Philippines. It will activated by the end of the year.

On 11 November 2013, Marks & Spencer announced "that it is set to have about 80 stores open in the [Indian] region by 2016 as part of its strategy to become a leading international, multichannel retailer" with partner Reliance Retail. It opened a flagship store in Bandra in Mumbai. M&S sales of lingerie accounts for more than a fifth of the sales in the Indian market, with total lingerie sales increasing by a third during the last six months of 2013. In May 2014, Marks & Spencer announced that their intention was now to open 100 stores in the country by 2016.

Stores in the territories of Hong Kong and Macau were sold in early 2018 to Al-Futtaim Group, a Dubai-based long-term franchise partner.

=== International locations ===
List of Marks & Spencer international locations (all formats) as of April 2026:

Asia
- Hong Kong: 22
- India: 85
- Indonesia: 21
- Macau: 2
- Malaysia: 10
- Philippines: 9
- Singapore: 8
Middle East and North Africa
- Bahrain: 2
- Egypt: 2
- Kuwait: 6
- Oman: 2
- Qatar: 6
- Saudi Arabia: 17
- United Arab Emirates: 16
Europe
- Cyprus: 15
- Czech Republic: 15
- Greece: 27
- Jersey: 7
- Malta: 6
- Romania: 3
- Spain: 4
- Turkey: 45

== Store formats ==
=== Full-line stores ===
M&S core shops typically feature a selection of the company's clothing, homeware and beauty ranges and an M&S Food-branded food hall. The range of clothing sold and the space given to it depends on the location and customer demographic (an example would be that some London shops do not stock the Classic Collection, but stock Limited Edition and a full Autograph range). Select locations feature an M&S Café. The current store format was designed by Urban Salon Architects in 2009.

=== M&S Food ===
All the St Michael Food hall supermarkets were renamed M&S Foodhall when Marks & Spencer dropped the St Michael brand in 2000. They sell groceries, which historically were all under the Marks & Spencer brand. However, in 2006, the company began selling a limited range of other brands, such as Coca-Cola and Stella Artois, without reducing the number of M&S lines they sold. This marked the first time in its 125-year history that Marks & Spencer had sold any brands other than its own. M&S introduced self-checkout tills in the food halls of a small number of trial stores in 2002. Self-service checkouts were implemented in the general merchandise sections in three trial stores in 2006. The M&S £10 meal deal was introduced in the late 2000s and included chimichurri beef steak, aromatic half duck, or fillet of fish. In 2018, the price was increased to give the customer a choice of prosecco, red wine, or white wine.

M&S launched a convenience format in 2001, branded Simply Food, with the first shops opening in Twickenham and Surbiton. These predominantly sell food, although some larger stores also stock a small selection of general merchandise. A number of these are run under franchise agreements:

- SSP Group runs the outlets at mainline railway stations and airports.
- Moto has outlets at many of its motorway service areas.
- BP has petrol stations with Simply Food offerings.

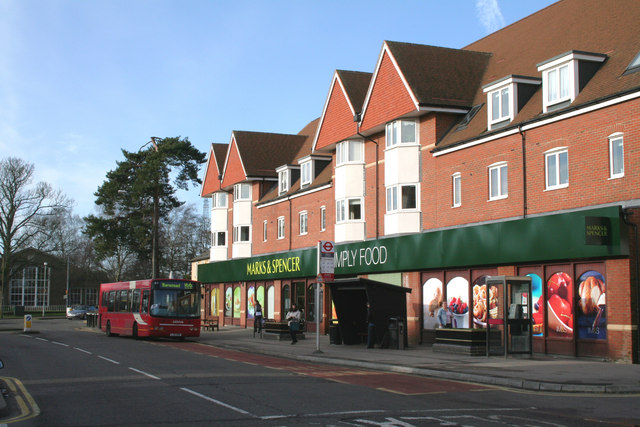
M&S Simply Food in Banstead, Surrey

Orders from M&S accounted for more than half of Uniq's food product supplies to UK retailers in 2010, after several years' service as a major M&S food product supplier.

The Simply Food brand was phased out in stand-alone larger stores after the rebrand in 2015, with the larger stores rebranded as M&S Foodhall.

In March 2019, M&S announced that they would open more supermarket-sized food halls, with a floor area of between 10,000 and 15,000 square feet (930 and 1,390 m^{2}), that would stock their full food range, in order to attract more families looking to do a weekly shop. M&S also lowered the price of more than 1,000 of their popular lines to compete with their larger supermarket rivals such as Tesco and Sainsbury's.

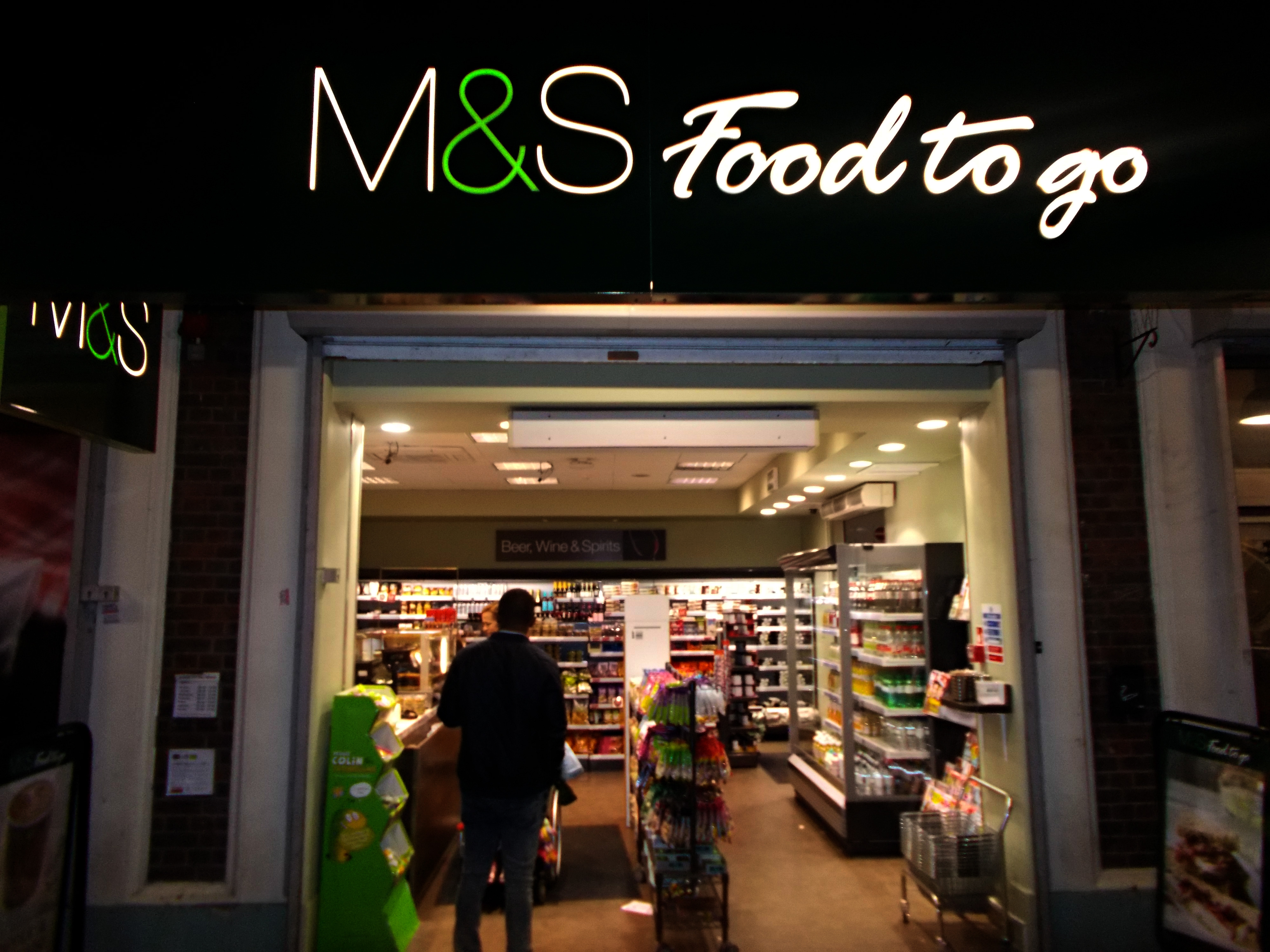
An M&S Food to Go store in Sutton station, Sutton, London

In 2019, M&S launched five new "food renewal" stores. This was part of the transformation of the food business, led by Managing Director Stuart Machin, to have bigger food stores with "the mind of a supermarket and the soul of a fresh market".

In 2019, M&S unified its food halls, supermarkets, convenience stores and offerings under the M&S Food brand. Stores were revamped to have a consistent market-like appearance.

=== Home stores ===
In 2007, M&S announced that dedicated shops for home furnishings were to be launched. These have been opened in Cheltenham in Gloucestershire (closed in 2024), Royal Tunbridge Wells in Kent, Lisburn Sprucefield in Northern Ireland, and in the Barton Square section of The Trafford Centre, Manchester.

=== Outlet stores ===
The outlet division offers M&S products, with the majority discounted at least 30% from the original selling price. The first of these stores opened at Ashford in Kent in 2000, and by 2020 there were 25. Many of the outlet shops are in retail parks and outlet centres, although others are high street shops such as the one in Woolwich, South London.

=== Online services ===
Online food deliveries began with trials in 2017. In 2019, M&S paid up to £750 million (dependent on future performance) for 50% of online retailer Ocado Retail Ltd, displacing Waitrose as Ocado's retail partner. Since 2020, customers are directed to Ocado's website where they can order food and selected clothing items. In February 2024, it was reported that M&S did not intend to pay the final £191 million instalment to Ocado, after performance targets were not met in 2023.

The online flower service was accused of unfair trading and using Google to piggy-back advertise on online searches aimed at Interflora online in 2010.

== Other services ==
In addition to the main retail business, M&S partners with other companies to provide additional M&S-branded services:

- M&S Bank – credit cards, loans and other financial services, operated by HSBC UK
- M&S Travel Money – in-store bureaux de change and foreign currency orders provided by a division of Eurochange
- M&S Opticians – operated by Owl Optical

== Product line history ==
Per Una's logo: three hearts

The "St Michael" brand was introduced by Simon Marks in 1928 in honour of his father and co-founder of Marks & Spencer, Michael Marks. By 1950, virtually all goods were sold under the St Michael brand. M&S lingerie, women's clothing and girls' uniform had been branded as St Margaret until 1950, when the whole range of general merchandise became St Michael. The St Michael brand was retired in 2000 but returned to a limited extent as an emblem in 2021.

The synthetic fibre Tricell was first used in 1957 and lasted until the 1970s. Another synthetic fibre called Courtelle was first launched, nationally, by Marks & Spencer during 1960 and lasted well into the 1970s. Machine-washable wool first appeared in 1972, and Lycra hosiery first came in during 1986.

"Per Una" was launched on 28 September 2001 as a joint venture between M&S and Next founder George Davies with the contribution of Julie Strang. The Per Una brand has been a major success for the company, and in October 2004, M&S bought the brand in a £125 million, two-year service contract with Davies. He was to stay on for at least two years to run the company, with 12-months' notice required if he wished to leave.

In 2004, Sir Stuart Rose discontinued a number of brands including the menswear brand "SP Clothing", the "View From" sportswear range, the David Beckham children's range "DB07" and several food lines, as he thought the company's stock inventory management had become "too complicated". A version of Per Una aimed at teenagers, "Per Una Due", was also discontinued, owing to poor sales, despite having launched earlier in the year.

The company began to sell branded goods such as Kellogg's corn flakes in November 2008. Following a review by Marc Bolland in 2011, M&S confirmed it would begin to reduce the number of branded items on sale, instead offering only those that it did not have an M&S alternative for.

In January 2021, Marks & Spencer purchased the Jaeger fashion brand from its administrators. The £5 million deal was part of the firm's strategy to boost its clothing division with new names. However, it did not include Jaeger's 63 shops and 13 concessions.

== Marketing ==
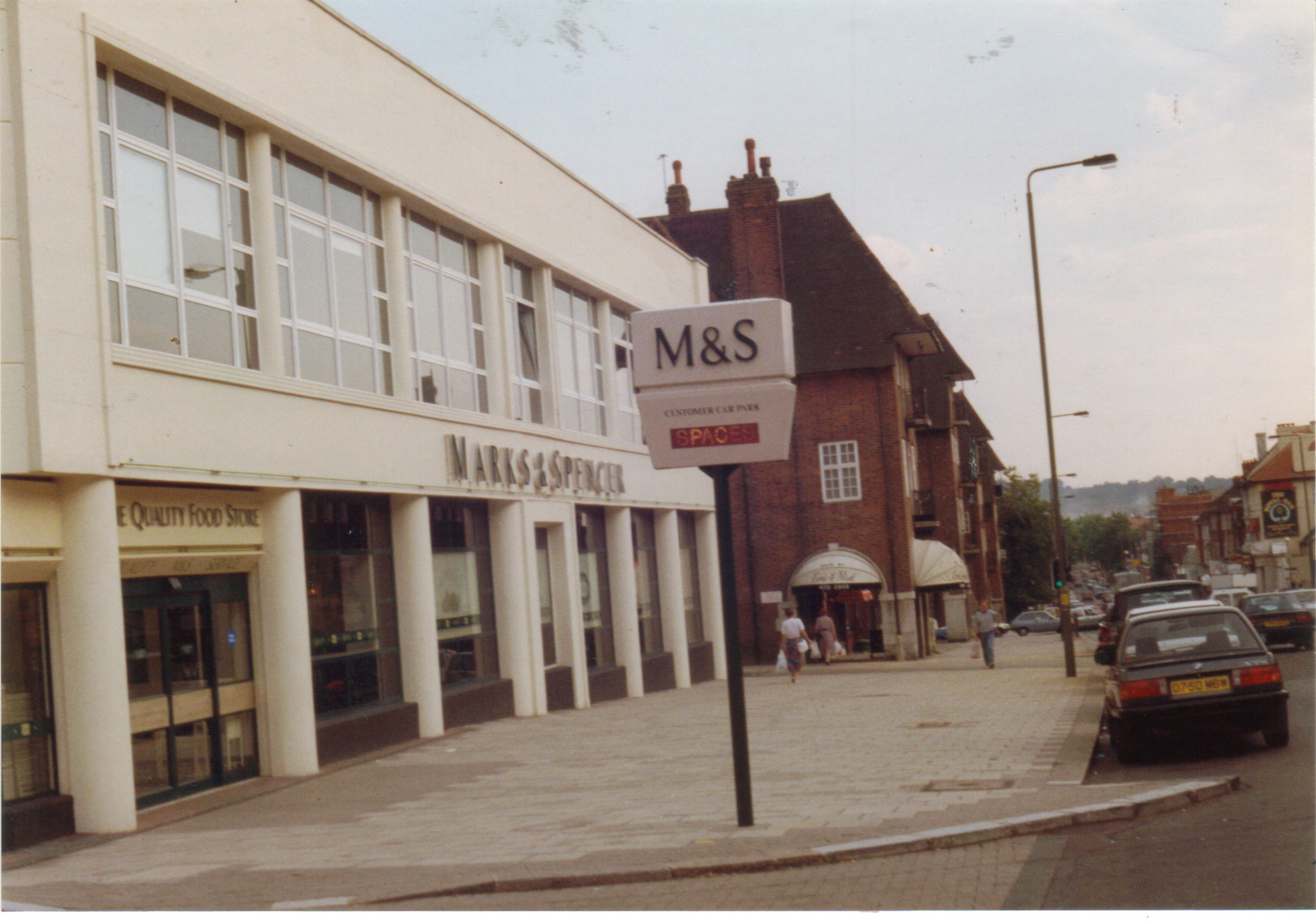
An M&S store with old signage, c. 1990

=== Early 2000s ===
The older logo, used from 2000 to 2007

During the height of the company's troubles at the beginning of the 21st century, the St Michael brand used as the selling label for all M&S products was discontinued in favour of Marks & Spencer and a new logo in the Optima typeface was introduced and began to appear in place of St Michael on product packaging. The same logo was also applied to store fascias and carrier bags. The St Michael name was subsequently adopted as a "quality guarantee" and appeared as the St Michael Quality Promise on the back of food products, on the side of delivery vehicles and on in-store ordering receipts.

=== Your M&S ===
Your M&S promotional logo 2004–2014

When Steve Sharp joined as marketing director in 2004, after being hired by Stuart Rose, he introduced a new promotional brand under the Your M&S banner, with a corresponding logo.

=== High-profile media campaigns ===
Logo 2007–2015

Est. 1884 byline variant used until 2022

M&S has run newspaper and/or magazine advertisements since the early 1950s, but the introduction of some famous stars, including Twiggy and David Jason in television advertisements helped raise the company's profile. Twiggy first appeared in 1967, returning later in 1995 and 2005. Anne Grierson featured in advertisements during the late 1950s and most of the 1960s. In later years, Erin O'Connor, Myleene Klass, David Beckham, Antonio Banderas, Claudia Schiffer, Helena Christensen, Tatjana Patitz, Lisa Snowdon, Dannii Minogue, V V Brown, and Carmen Kass have featured in advertisements. John Sergeant, David Jason and Joanna Lumley have either appeared in or voiced over advertisements since 2008.

Advertisements from the 2000s had the tag-line "This is not just food, this is M&S food" and featured slow motion, close-up footage of various food products, described in a sultry voice-over by Dervla Kirwan, to an enticing instrumental song — including Fleetwood Mac's "Albatross" as well as Santana's "Samba Pa Ti", Olly Murs' "Busy", Groove Armada's "At the River" or Spandau Ballet's "True". These advertisements were referred to by some sections of the media as food porn, with a number of other companies copying the idea, such as Aldi and, subsequently, Waitrose.

The 2009 TV advertising campaign drew complaints, leading to national press coverage, regarding sexism.

In 2010, it was confirmed that Dannii Minogue would be one of the new faces of Marks & Spencer. She filmed her first commercial in South Africa, which featured Cheryl Lynn's "Got to Be Real", for their Spring campaign that aired on 24 March. In August 2011, M&S announced the new faces of their campaigns would be Rosie Huntington-Whiteley, Ryan Reynolds, and David Gandy.

Marks & Spencer released a series of planned television adverts in July 2011, featuring Twiggy, Minogue and V V Brown, as it started its corporate image revamp. It confirmed that Twiggy, Lisa Snowdon, and Jamie Redknapp would return for future advertising.

On 31 March 2014, M&S launched the new iteration of its "Leading Ladies" marketing campaign featuring Emma Thompson, Annie Lennox, Rita Ora and Doreen Lawrence.

In 2021, ITV ordered the reality cooking competition series Cooking with the Stars; the series is co-funded by M&S and contains product placement for the chain's product ranges. M&S has promoted the series across its marketing channels, usually highlighting the specific products that were utilized in each episode.

In June 2024, Alex Scott became the sportswear ambassador at M&S.

=== "Love That" campaign ===
Starting in September 2025, Marks and Spencer launched the "Love That" campaign, starting with a weekly YouTube series featuring stylist Melissa Holdbrook-Akposoe and Capital Breakfast stars – Jordan North, Siân Welby and Chris Stark. The episodes involve the presenters discussing latest trends, behind the scenes insights and giveaways. The campaign also has multiple short adverts involving actors wearing clothes that the company sells, and commenting "Love That" whilst observing the model wearing it.

=== Sponsorship ===
In February 2026, the Williams F1 Team announced M&S as the team's official travel kit partner.

== Bibliography ==
- Burns, Paul (2008). Corporate Entrepreneurship: Building an Entrepreneurial Organization. Basingstoke: Palgrave Macmillan. ISBN 978-023-054-263-1.
