= Stuart Rose =

British businessman and life peer (born 1949)

The Right Honourable The Lord Rose of Monewden
- Born: 17 March 1949 (age 77); Gosport, Hampshire, England
- Occupation: Businessman
- Years active: 1972–present
- Title: CEO of Burton Group PLC (1994–?); CEO of Argos (1997–1998); CEO of Arcadia Group (2000–2002); CEO of M&S (2004–2010); Executive chairman of M&S (2008–2011); Non-executive director of Woolworths Holdings Ltd. (2011–present); Chairman of Oasis Dental; Chairman of EG Group (2021–present); Chairman of Asda (2021–2024)
- Political party: Conservative
- Spouse: Jennifer Cook (m. 1973; div. 2010)
- Partner: Kate Reardon (until 2009)
- Children: 2

Member of the House of Lords
- Lord Temporal
- Life peerage 17 September 2014

Stuart Alan Ransom Rose, Baron Rose of Monewden (born 17 March 1949) is a British businessman and life peer, who was the executive chairman of Marks & Spencer until 2010, remaining as chairman until early 2011.

Rose was chairman of online retailer Ocado from 2013 to July 2020. He has been chairman of Asda since 2021.

In October 2015, he was appointed chair of Britain Stronger in Europe, the official remain campaign in the 2016 referendum on the United Kingdom's membership of the European Union.

Rose served as chairman of Asda from 2021 to 2024 and took on executive responsibilities in September 2024.

== Early life ==
Rose's grandparents were White Russian émigrés who fled to China after the 1917 revolution. Their son (later named Harry Ransom-Rose) was unofficially adopted by Nona Ransom, a Quaker from Bedford, England, who served as English tutor to (among others) Empress Wanrong (the last Empress of China), and Shunryu Suzuki (the Japanese monk who later established the first Zen monastery outside East Asia).

Nona transported Stuart Rose's father, Harry, to safety in England as war loomed. The original family name was Bryantzeff, which Rose's father, ex-RAF and civil servant, changed. His mother's side is English, Scottish and Greek.

The young family lived in a caravan in Warwickshire until Rose senior obtained a posting with the Imperial Civil Service in Tanganyika (now Tanzania). Rose went to the Roman Catholic St Joseph's Convent School in Dar es Salaam until he was 11. When he was 13 years old his family returned to England and his parents sent him to Bootham School, an independent Quaker boarding school in York.

== Career ==
Rose first joined Marks & Spencer in 1972, as a management trainee. Rose remained with Marks & Spencer until 1989, when he joined the Burton Group as Chief Executive in 1994. The Burton Group demerged, forming the Arcadia and Debenhams businesses.

In 1997, he joined Argos as Chief Executive, where he was charged with defending the company against a takeover bid from the home shopping giant, Great Universal Stores (GUS). Ultimately, GUS did succeed in taking control of Argos, although Rose was praised for negotiating an increased price for the retailer.

In a turbulent time in its history, Rose became the Chief Executive of Booker plc, where he oversaw the merger of the company with Iceland to form the Big Food Group.

Rose joined the Arcadia Group in 2000 as Chief Executive and left in 2002 following its acquisition. Rose turned around the fortunes of the Arcadia Group, and sold the group for over £800m, netting himself around £25m as part of the deal.

He was appointed to the position of Chief Executive of Marks & Spencer in May 2004 at the age of 56 and subsequently fought off takeover bids by Philip Green for the Group. For this role he was paid an annual salary of £1,130,000. In January 2007, he was named the "2006 Business Leader of the Year" by the World Leadership Forum for his efforts in restoring the fortunes of Marks & Spencer. He was knighted in the 2008 New Year Honours for services to the retail industry and to corporate social responsibility, and was appointed chairman of Business in the Community on 1 January 2008.

In 2008, Rose became executive chairman of Marks & Spencer. However, in the light of a recent profits warning, which sparked an unprecedented thirty per cent-plus plunge in the company's shares, this appointment caused some concern to many shareholders. Nevertheless, they voted to re-appoint him at their annual meeting on 9 July 2008. He stepped down as chief executive in May 2010, as executive chairman in July 2010, and as chairman in January 2011 following the appointment of Robert Swannell.

On 19 January 2011, Rose was appointed as a non-executive director of Woolworths Holdings Ltd, a large South African retail group listed on the Johannesburg Stock Exchange.

On 6 September 2012, Rose was appointed as non-executive chairman of Dressipi.com, an online personalised fashion service that matches clothes and accessories to a shopper's shape, style and individual preferences.

In 2013, Rose became an independent non-executive director and chairman of Ocado, the UK internet-only grocery retailer.

He was recruited to advise the government on turning around failing hospitals, asked to examine how to improve the organisational culture in under-performing hospitals and ways to recruit talent from inside and outside the NHS in February 2014.

In 2014, Rose was created a life peer and took a seat on the Conservative benches in the House of Lords. In October 2015, Rose was appointed chair of Britain Stronger in Europe, the official remain campaign in the 2016 referendum on the United Kingdom's membership of the European Union. After stating to a select committee in March 2016 that wages would go up should Britain leave the European Union, his public role was allegedly limited for the rest of the campaign. In 2019, Rose dismissed calls for a second referendum, stating that he 'believes in a democratic process', despite being a Remainer.

In 2015 Rose became Chairman of Time Out Market, owned by Time Out Group.

On 14 July 2020, Rose stepped down from his role as chairman of Ocado.

As of 2020 Rose chaired privately held businesses including Dressipi, an online fashion start-up, and Zenith, a vehicle-leasing and fleet management company.

On 21 January 2021, Rose was appointed non-executive chairman of EG Group.

On 23 November 2021, Rose was appointed chairman of Asda as its first dedicated chairman in more than 20 years.

On 19 September 2024, Rose took on executive responsibilities at Asda, leading day-to-day operations alongside TDR Capital's Rob Hattrell.

== Personal life ==
His mother, who had a history of depression, took her own life at the age of 49. She took an overdose combined with alcohol when Rose was 26 years old.

Rose lives in Central London and Suffolk. He married Jennifer Cook in 1973 in Marylebone. They had one son and one daughter. After they separated, Rose lived with fashion writer Kate Reardon. Then, after separating from Reardon in 2009, and stepping down from his positions at M&S, Rose and Cook divorced in 2010.

== Honours ==
In 2007, Rose was awarded an Honorary Doctorate by Heriot-Watt University. The following year, he was knighted in the 2008 New Year Honours for services to the retail industry and to corporate social responsibility.

In 2009, the University of East Anglia conferred upon him an Honorary Doctor of the University degree (Hon. D.Univ.). On 16 July 2010, he was awarded an Honorary Doctor of Laws (Hon. LL.D) from the University of Leeds, the same university from which his son graduated. He later received an Honorary Doctorate from the University of York in 2013.

On 8 August 2014, it was announced that Rose was going to be a Conservative peer in the House of Lords. Subsequently, on 17 September 2014, he was created a life peer taking the title Baron Rose of Monewden, of Monewden in the County of Suffolk.

Rose is a Fellow of WWF-UK.

Business positions
Preceded by Roger Holmes	CEO of Marks & Spencer; 2004–2010	Succeeded by Marc Bolland
Party political offices
New office	Chair of the Britain Stronger in Europe Campaign; 2015–2016	Position abolished
Orders of precedence in the United Kingdom
Preceded by The Lord Goddard of Stockport	Gentlemen; Baron Rose of Monewden	Followed by The Lord Cooper of Windrush
