= Michael Marks =

Businessman and co-founder of Marks & Spencer

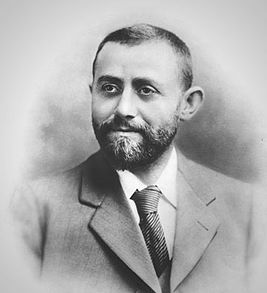
- Born: Michał Marks; Disputed year of birth Slonim, Grodno Governorate, Russian Empire (now Belarus)
- Died: 31 December 1907; Salford, England
- Occupation: Businessman
- Known for: Co-founder of Marks & Spencer
- Spouse: Hannah Cohen (m. 1886)

Michael Marks (Yiddish: מיכאל מאַרקס; Polish: Michał Marks; 1859? – 31 December 1907) was a Polish-Jewish entrepreneur and later a British businessman, who with Thomas Spencer co-founded the retail chain Marks & Spencer.

== Biography ==
Marks was born into a Polish Ashkenazi Jewish family in Słonim, in what was then the multinational Russian Empire (now Grodno Region, Belarus). He immigrated to Britain around 1882 and moved to Leeds, where a company called Barran was known to employ Jewish immigrants. He married Hannah Cohen at the Great Synagogue on Belgrave Street, Leeds, in 1886.

Marks met Isaac Dewhirst, the owner of a Leeds warehouse, in 1884. A deal was arranged, whereby Marks agreed to buy goods from Dewhirst and sell them in nearby villages. The venture was a success and enabled Marks to raise enough capital to establish a stall in Leeds' open market. At his stall, he used the slogan "Don't Ask the Price – it's a Penny". He also sold goods at Castleford and Wakefield markets.

Marks also made the decision to rent an area at the new covered market in Leeds, which traded six days of the week. Over the next few years, Marks expanded his business and opened similar stalls in covered market halls all over Yorkshire and Lancashire.

=== Marks & Spencer ===
In 1894 Marks decided that if he was to expand the business further, he would need a business partner. He initially approached Isaac Dewhirst, who decided against the offer but suggested that his cashier Thomas Spencer might be interested. Spencer decided that the £300 (equivalent to £41,700 in 2024) required for a half-share in the business would be a good investment.

The running of the business was split between Spencer, who managed the office and warehouse, and Marks, who continued to run the market stalls. Spencer had developed some important contacts while working for Isaac Dewhirst, and these allowed him to get the best prices for goods by dealing directly with the manufacturers. Together, Spencer and Marks were able to open stores in Manchester, Birmingham, Liverpool, Middlesbrough, Sheffield, Bristol, Hull, Sunderland and Cardiff.

A new warehouse in Manchester was built in 1897. This store became the centre of an enterprise that, by then, included thirty-six branches. New stores had been built in Bradford, Leicester, Northampton, Preston, and Swansea. London had a total of seven branches. On 5 May 1897 Marks was naturalised as a British subject.

In 1903 Marks & Spencer became a limited company. Spencer's original £300 investment had grown to a value of £15,000 (equivalent to £2,085,000 in 2024) and he retired later that year. Michael Marks continued to develop the business until his death at Knolls House, 396 Bury New Road, Salford, on 31 December 1907. He was buried in the Old Jewish cemetery (Hebrew Congregation), Crumpsall, in plot number 1917, on 2 January 1908.

In 1928 long after the death of Marks, his son Simon Marks, later the first Baron Marks of Broughton, laid the foundations for a long tradition. He introduced the "St Michael" brand name in honour of his father, which remained in use until 2000.

== See also ==
- List of people from Belarus
- List of Poles

== Bibliography ==
- Burns, Paul (2008). Corporate Entrepreneurship: Building an Entrepreneurial Organization. Basingstoke: Palgrave Macmillan. ISBN 978-0-230-54263-1.
- Chislett, Helen (2009). Marks in time : 125 years of Marks & Spencer. London: Weidenfeld & Nicolson. ISBN 978-0-297-85873-7.
