= Steve Rowe (businessman) =

British businessman

- Born: Stephen Joseph Rowe; July 1967 (age 58)
- Occupations: Former CEO, Marks & Spencer

Stephen Joseph Rowe (born July 1967) is a British businessman who was the CEO of Marks & Spencer from 2016 to 2022.

== Early life ==
Stephen Joseph Rowe was born in July 1967. He is from Croydon. His father, Joe Rowe also worked for M&S, where he was head of food, and a main board director.

== Career ==
Rowe has spent almost his entire career at Marks & Spencer, starting in Croydon working on Saturdays, aged 15.

Aged 18, Rowe joined Topshop as a trainee, and soon became a store manager, but returned to M&S, "frustrated with the lack of career development at the company".

In January 2016 it was announced that Marc Bolland, who was CEO since 2010 would step down in April 2016, and be replaced by Rowe, who was then head of clothing, and had previously been head of the food business.

In April 2016, he became the CEO of M&S. In March 2022 it was announced that Rowe would step down as CEO being replaced by COO Stuart Machin. Rowe officially left the company in July 2022 after 37 years. He was awarded a final £1.6 million pay package.

== Personal life ==
Rowe is a "diehard Millwall fan". He lives in Purley.

Business positions
Preceded by Marc Bolland	CEO of Marks & Spencer; 2016–2023	Succeeded by Stuart Machin
Incumbent
