= Eurochange =

British bureau de change company

- Type: Subsidiary
- Industry: Foreign exchange
- Founded: 1975
- Founder: Massimo Gini
- Headquarters: Stevenage, United Kingdom
- Area served: United Kingdom
- Parent: Western Union
- Website: www.eurochange.co.uk

Eurochange, stylised eurochange, is a British foreign exchange company based in Stevenage. As of 2023, the company operates over 190 physical branches throughout the United Kingdom and also offers home delivery.

In 2025 the company was sold by Corsair to the American financial services firm Western Union.

== History ==
Eurochange was founded in London in 1975. In 2000, the company changed its name to FX Currency Services, and in 2011, it was renamed back to Eurochange.

In 2014, the company was acquired by ATM operator NoteMachine, itself being owned by Corsair Capital, an American financial services company. In October 2022, it was announced that Corsair was selling NoteMachine to Brink's, but would maintain ownership of Eurochange.

The company won the MoneyAge Travel Money Provider of the Year award four years consecutively from its creation in 2016 until its discontinuation in 2019.

In March 2022, Edinburgh Live stated that Eurochange had the second best exchange rates for United States dollars and euros in Edinburgh, out of a range of five companies (Travel FX, Eurochange, Tesco Bank, John Lewis, and Sainsbury's) operating within the city.

In December 2022, the Association of British Travel Agents (ABTA) announced that it would be launching a travel money service in partnership with Eurochange. This service, known as ABTA Travel Money, is the first foreign exchange service operated under the ABTA brand.

Eurochange has seen steady growth in locations, with an average of 30 opening a year since their acquisition by NoteMachine. For example, the company opened an outlet in the Manchester Arndale in 2015, as well as two in CastleCourt and one in The Pavilions in 2018. The company now handles over 2.5 million customer transactions a year.

In 2025 the company was sold by Corsair to the American financial services firm Western Union.

== Services ==
=== Foreign exchange ===
The company offers foreign exchange of over 60 currencies, including the U.S. dollar, euro, and Turkish lira through its physical bureaux de change located on high streets and in shopping centres, as well as online through its own website. The company operates ABTA Travel Money, Marks & Spencer Travel Money and NatWest Travel Money. The company also offers a multi-currency prepaid debit card through Mastercard's Cash Passport brand.

Eurochange also offers a travel money buy-back service, where customers can sell their unused currency after a holiday back to the company for a fee of £4 for 30%.
