= Hotelschool The Hague =

Business School in The Hague

- Motto: Discover your potential at the heart of hospitality
- Type: University of Applied Sciences
- Established: 1929
- Affiliations: Hotel Schools of Distinction
- Chairman: Mr. Wolfgang M. Neumann
- President: Mrs. Regine von Stieglitz
- Faculty: 250
- Students: 2.800
- Undergraduates: Bachelor of Arts in Hospitality Management
- Postgraduates: MBA in International Hospitality Management, Master Programme Leading in Hotel Transformation
- Location: Amsterdam & The Hague, The Netherlands; 52°6′28.31″N 4°17′33.65″E
- Campus: Urban area
- Language: English
- Colours: black and white
- Website: www.hotelschool.nl

Hotelschool The Hague is a single sector university of applied sciences in the Netherlands. It was founded and funded in 1929 by the hospitality industry. In 2010, Hotelschool The Hague founded its university wide Research Centre, focusing on interdisciplinary research with a strong practice-oriented focus.

== History ==
Hotelschool The Hague was founded in 1929 and is one of the oldest independent hotel schools in the world. The school has two campuses, one in The Hague and one in Amsterdam. Together these host more than 2850 students and 250 employees. Hotelschool The Hague has several programmes on offer, including a four-year Bachelor of Arts in hospitality management, a fast-track bachelor programme and a 13-month master of business administration in international hospitality management.

Hotelschool The Hague has been voted the best public hotel school in the Netherlands since 2014 and ranks among the top hospitality management schools worldwide according to QS World University Rankings. Furthermore, according to Keuzegids, the school had the best Master in Business Administration since 2019. Graduates of Hotelschool The Hague hold management positions in the hospitality industry worldwide.

== Programmes ==
=== Bachelor of Business Administration in Hotel Management ===
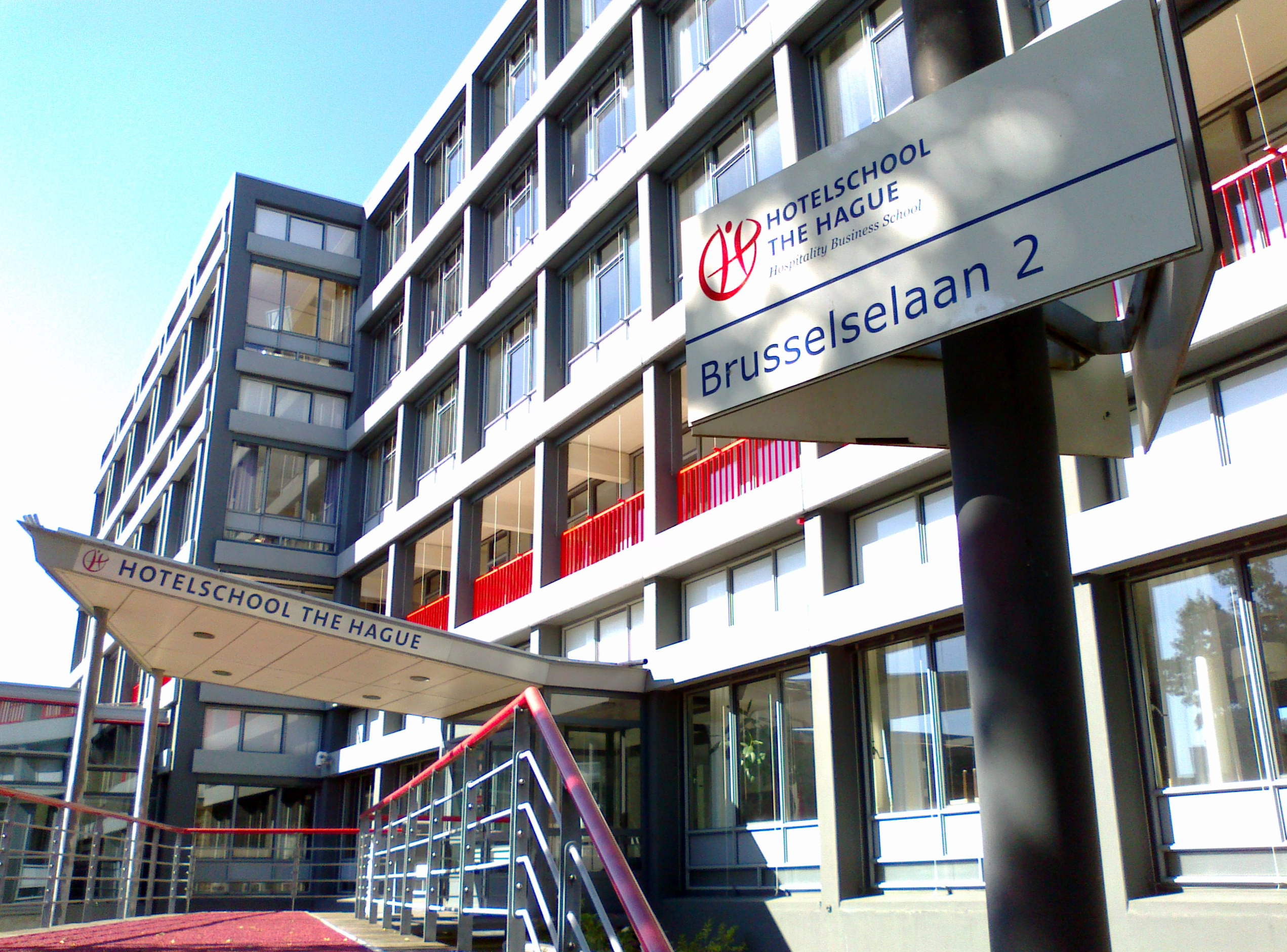
The Hague campus of Hotelschool The Hague

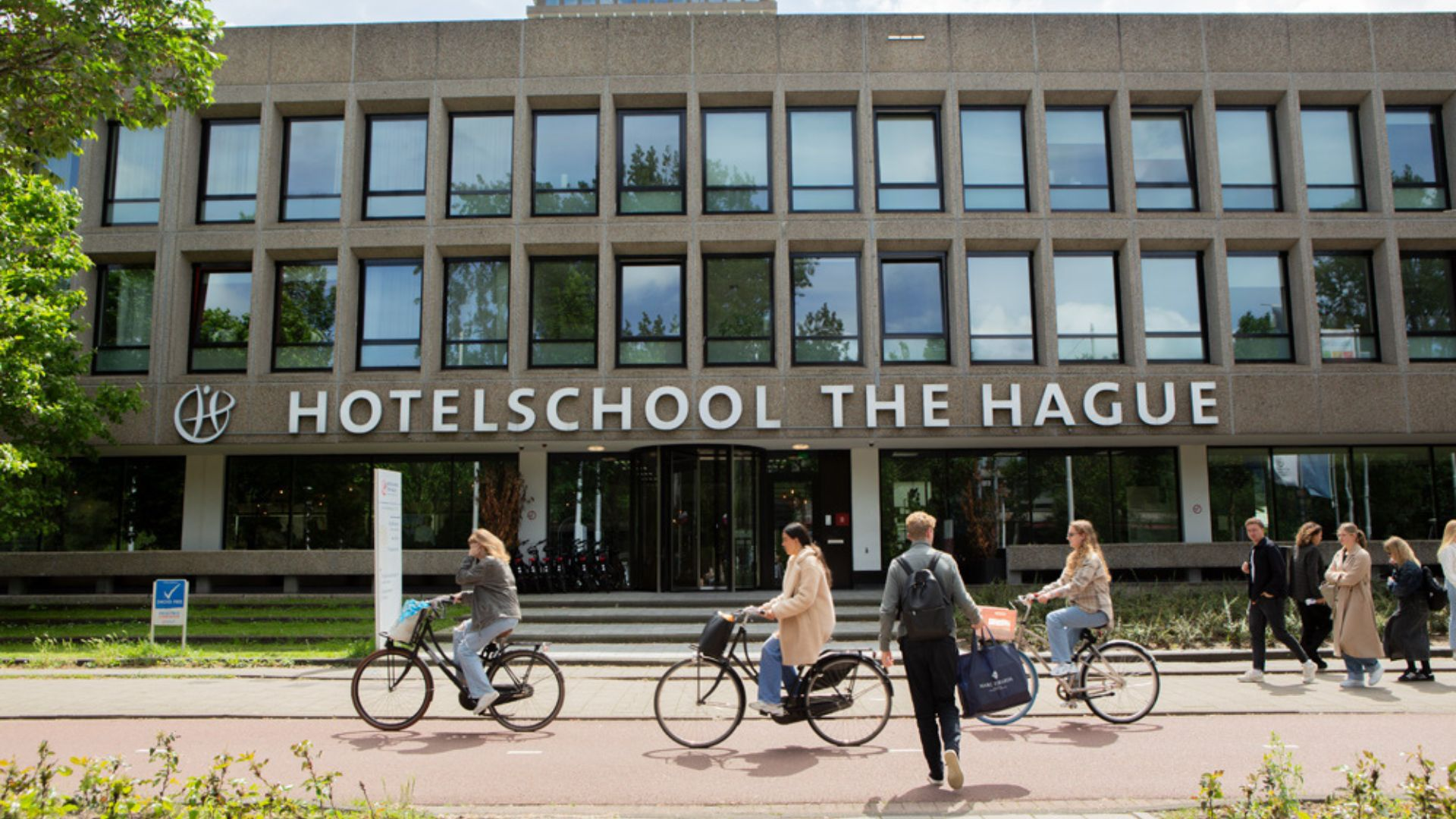
Amsterdam campus of Hotelschool The Hague

Hotelschool The Hague offers a single Bachelor Programme on its campuses in The Hague and Amsterdam. The programme is taught in English for both national as well as international students. The four-year bachelor's course results in an internationally recognised Bachelor of Business Administration in Hotel Management.

The Bachelor Programme is a business study set in the context of hospitality, where students learn about hospitality from a strategic, tactical and operational perspective and participate in two internships abroad.

The university offers a Fast Track Programme for students with a previous qualification in hospitality-related studies. The first two years of the regular Bachelor Programme are replaced by a four-week programme in the summer, with the rest of the course equal to the regular course.

=== MBA in International Hospitality Management ===
Hotelschool The Hague offers a 13-month full-time MBA Programme with a focus on business development, concept innovation and change management. In 2017, the MBA has been ranked Best Master of Business in the Netherlands.

== International reputation ==
The course programmes have been accredited by the Accreditation Organisation of The Netherlands and Flanders (NVAO). In 2012, the Bachelor Programme was accredited with an 'excellent' score for 11 out of 16 quality dimensions (objectives of the education, curriculum, personnel & faculty, facilities, quality management and results of the programme).

In 2017, Hotelschool The Hague was named Best Public Hotel School in The Netherlands for the third consecutive year.

In 2013 Hotelschool The Hague was ranked among the top 5 hospitality schools worldwide for preparing students for an international career in hospitality management. The survey was conducted by TNS Global. In 2006, Hotelschool The Hague was described as one of the best three international centers of hotel management by "Caterer & Hotel keeper"
