= Simon Marks, 1st Baron Marks of Broughton =

British businessman (1888–1964)

The Right Honourable The Lord Marks of Broughton
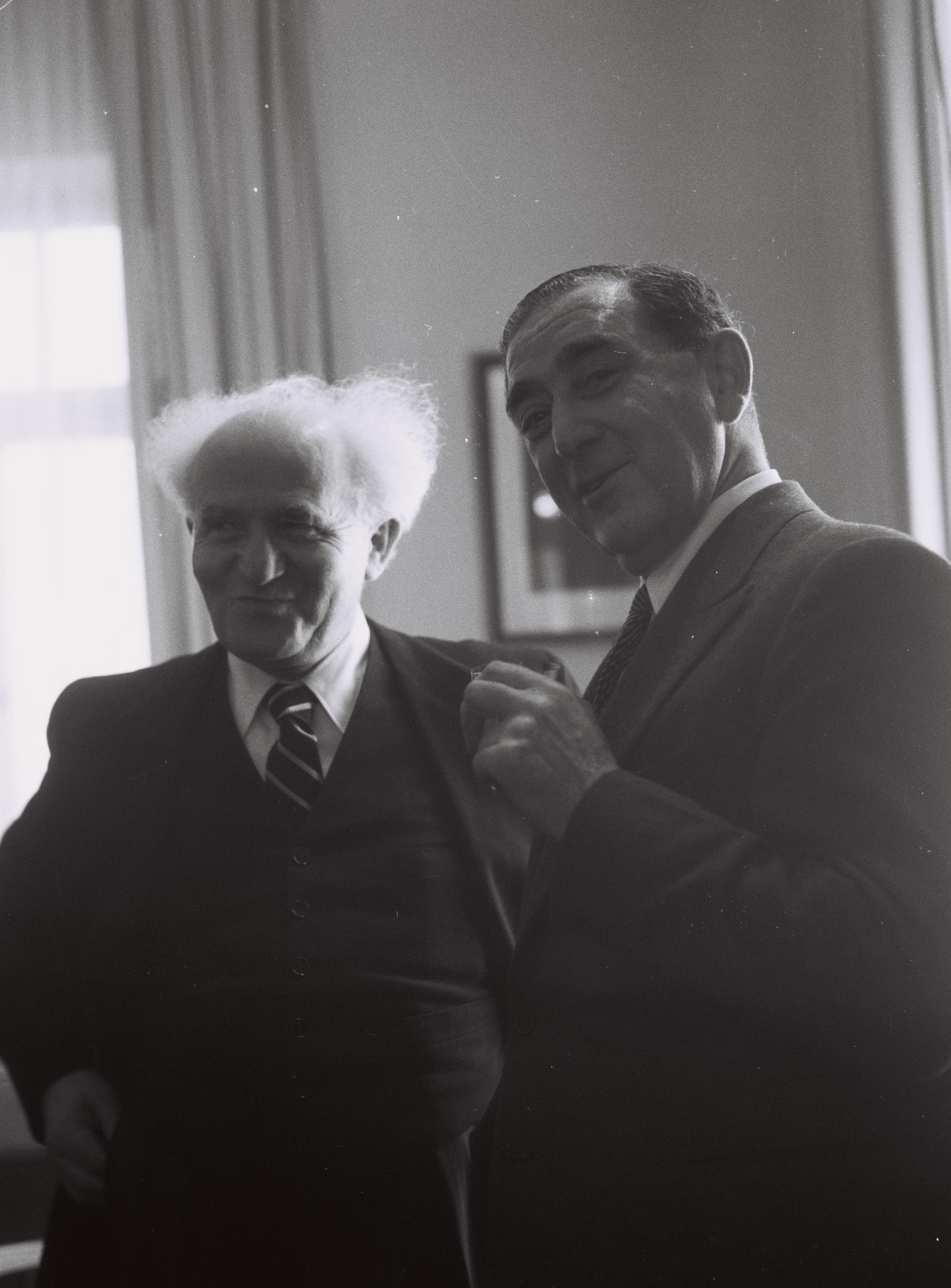
- Sir Simon Marks (right) with David Ben-Gurion in Tel Aviv, 1949
- Born: 9 July 1888; Leeds, England
- Died: 8 December 1964 (aged 76); London, England
- Relatives: Michael Marks (father); Michael Marks, (son)

Simon Marks, 1st Baron Marks of Broughton (9 July 1888 – 8 December 1964), was an English retail businessman and baron, the son of Michael Marks, the co-founder of major British multinational company Marks & Spencer.

== Biography ==
=== Early life ===
Marks was born in the Leylands, Leeds, on 9 July 1888, son of Michael Marks and Hannah Cohen, and educated at Manchester Grammar School.

=== Career ===
In 1907, he inherited a number of "penny bazaars" from his father, which had been established with Thomas Spencer. With the help of Israel Sieff, he built Marks & Spencer into an icon of British business.

He was knighted on 4 July 1944 and on 10 July 1961 was raised to the peerage as Baron Marks of Broughton, of Sunningdale in the Royal County of Berkshire.

=== Death and legacy ===
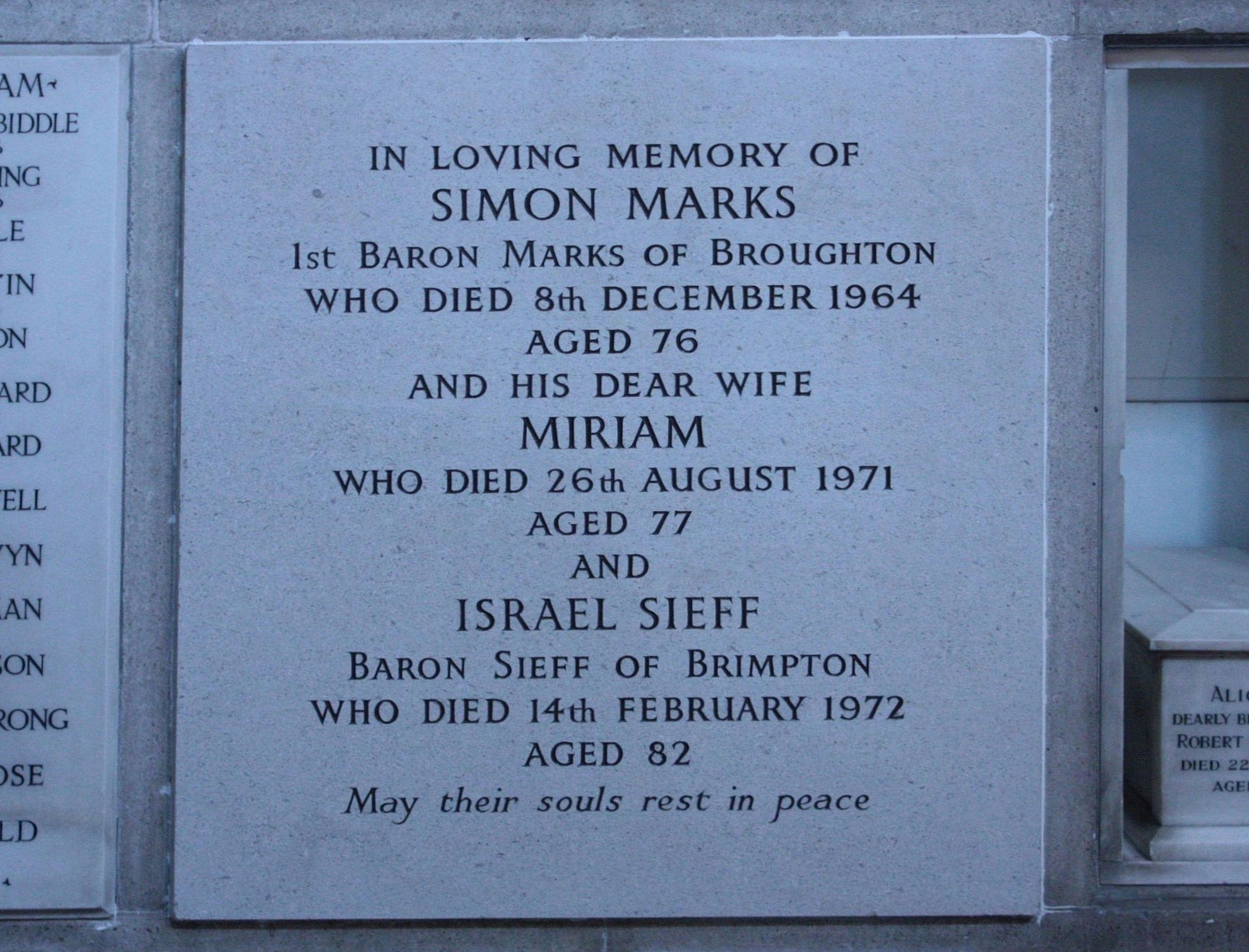
The grave of Simon Marks, Golders Green Crematorium (within the columbarium)

Marks died 8 December 1964, in London, and was cremated at Golders Green Crematorium. His ashes and memorial are housed within the internal columbarium (visible by arrangement). The ashes of his wife Miriam Marks (née Sieff, sister of Israel Sieff), and those of his business partner Israel Sieff, rest with his.

He was succeeded in the barony by his only son, Michael Marks, 2nd Baron Marks of Broughton, who died in 1998 and was succeeded in the title by his own son, Simon Marks, 3rd Baron Marks of Broughton.

== Coat of arms ==
Coat of arms of Simon Marks, 1st Baron Marks of Broughton
Notes Coat of arms of Baron Marks of Broughton family Coronet A coronet of a Baron Crest A Dove wings addorsed Argent beaked and membered Gules gorged with an Antique Crown and to the beak a Gimmel Ring Escutcheon Pily Argent and Azure a Pair of Scales Or Supporters On either side a Lion Or supporting a Cornucopia Argent the Fruit proper that on the dexter holding aloft with the interior forepaw a Red Rose slipped and leaved also proper and that on the sinister holding aloft with the interior forepaw two Triangles interlaced Or Motto Strive Probe Apply

Peerage of the United Kingdom
New creation	Baron Marks of Broughton; 1961–1964	Succeeded by Michael Marks
