= Sieff =

Sieff is a surname. Notable people with the surname include:

- Adam Sieff (born 1954), Communications Director at Dune Music, and a former Sony Music Director of Jazz
- Annika Sieff (born 2003), Italian ski jumper
- Israel Sieff, Baron Sieff (1889–1972), British businessman
- Jeanloup Sieff (1933–2000), fashion photographer
- Joseph Sieff (1906–1982), businessman and British Zionist
- Marcus Sieff, Baron Sieff of Brimpton OBE (1913–2001), Jewish British businessman, chairman of Marks & Spencer from 1972 to 1982
