= David Sieff =

British businessman (1939–2019)

Hon. Sir David Daniel Sieff FRSA (22 March 1939 – 27 May 2019) was a British businessman who was a director of retailers Marks & Spencer from 1972 to 1997.

Sieff was born in Marylebone, London, the only child of Marcus Sieff, Baron Sieff of Brimpton, and Rosalie Fromson. His grandparents were Rebecca Marks and Israel Sieff, Baron Sieff. He was a great-grandson of Michael Marks, the founder of Marks & Spencer.

He was educated at Repton School and joined Marks & Spencer in 1957, the last descendant of Michael Marks to serve on the board of the firm.

He was knighted in 1999.

Sieff married Jennifer Walton in 1962 and had two sons, Simon Marcus (born 1965) and Jonathan David (born 1966).

He died on 27 May 2019 at the age of 80.
