= Georges Saupique =

French sculptor

- Born: 17 May 1889; Paris, France
- Died: 8 May 1961 (aged 71); Paris, France
- Education: École nationale supérieure des beaux-arts
- Occupation: Sculptor

Georges Saupique was a French sculptor born on 17 May 1889 in Paris. He died in Paris on 8 May 1961.

== Biography ==
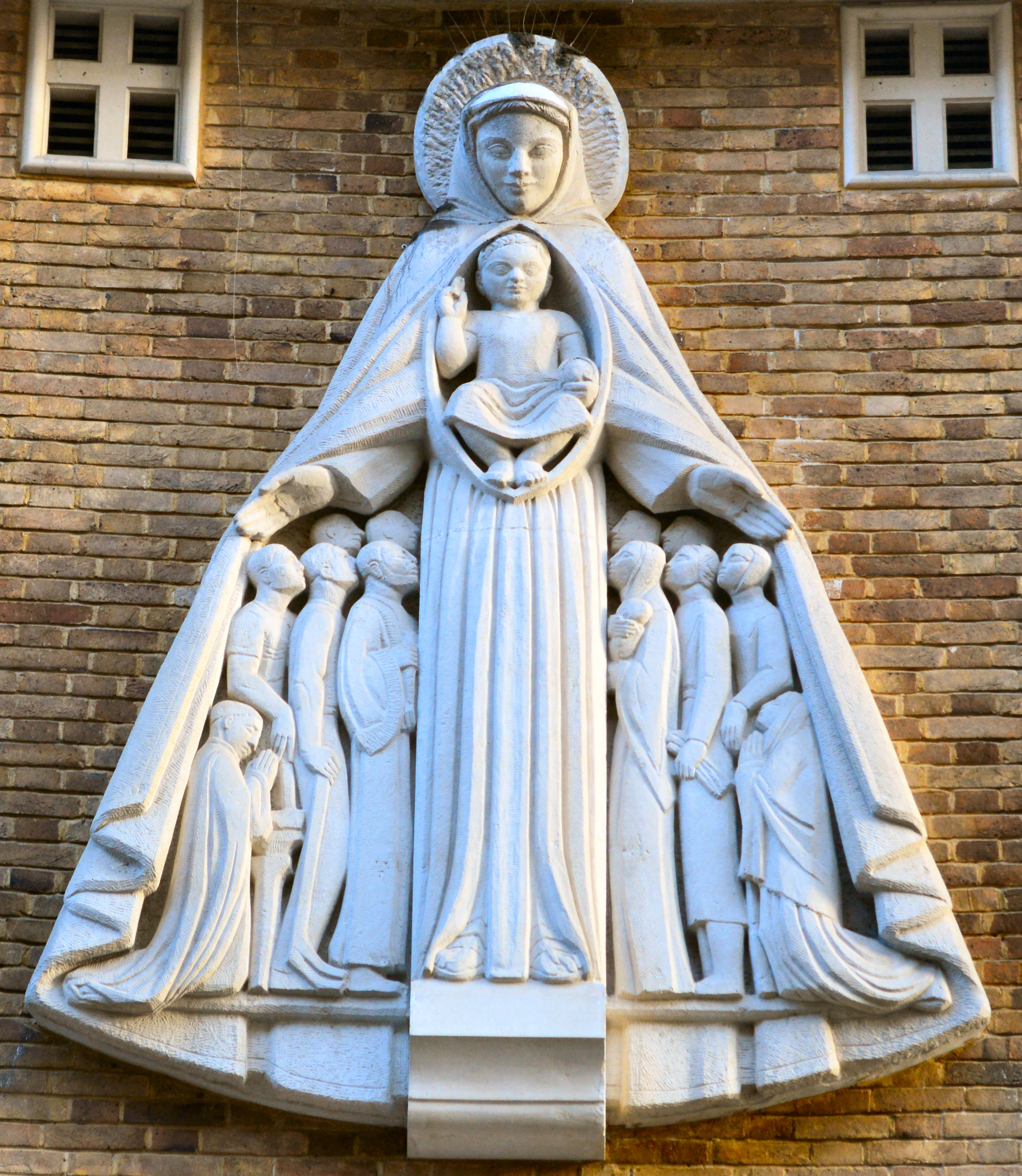
Soho, Notre Dame De France Church, Bas relief carving of Our Lady of Mercy (1953) by Georges-Laurent Saupique (1889-1961)

After studies at the Stanilas college in Paris and the lycée Henri-IV, he studied at Paris' École nationale supérieure des beaux-arts his teachers including Hippolyte Lefèbvre, Jules Coutan and Aristide Rousaud. During the 1914-1918 war he served as a Lieutenant in the Chasseurs à pied. He married Jacqueline Bouchot a professor at the École du Louvre. He was a friend of the sculptor Raymond Delamarre and started to show his work at the Salon des artistes français in 1922. In 1923 he also exhibited at the Salon d'automne and in 1925 took part in the Exposition internationale des Arts décoratifs and presented there his bas-relief "L'Auroch" in the exhibition's pavilion called "La Douce France" which was awarded the international prize for architecture. In 1935 some of this pavilion was erected in Étampes – See entry below. From 1926 he exhibited his work at the Salon des Tuileries and in 1927 the financier Octave Homberg commissioned Saupique to decorate the hall of his office at the Société financière française et coloniale (SFFC) on rue Pasquier in Paris. Saupique took two years to complete four large allegories L'Afrique noire", L'Indochine, L'Afrique du Nord, et Les Antilles", each 21 metres high. These are held in a private collection. Saupique also created several reliefs for the front of the SFFC building on rue Pasquier, and seven of these are still in place. In 1931 he sculpted the "Fontaine des lions" for the AOF building and decorated the SFFC's pavilion at the Paris Colonial Exhibition. Clearly Saupique had a love of and a knowledge of animals. 1935 saw him commissioned to work on four bas-reliefs for the ocean liner "Normandie" and then in 1936 work started on building the Église du Sacré-Cœur in Gentilly for use by the Cité universitaire and Saupique was commissioned to execute several stone sculptures both inside and outside the church including some magnificent bas- reliefs around the main entrance door as well as four bronze angels for the bell tower. Work on the decoration of the palais de Chaillot for the Paris exhibition of 1937 gave work opportunities to 57 sculptors and Saupique worked on a huge relief on the side of the building giving on to the rue Franklin. This was called "L'Asie". After the war he worked often with Louis Leygue including the massive restoration needed on Reims cathedral by Henri Deneux. He was the sculptor of one of the bronze works making up the Mémorial de la France combattante at mont Valérien. In 1946 he worked on his most popular work, the bust of Marianne. Le Musée du Louvre in Paris, the Musée des Années Trente at Boulogne-Billancourt and the Musée Rodin at Meudon all hold several of his works. Saupique created a huge body of work in his lifetime and this is a summary of most of these sculptures. He was involved in war memorials covering both World Wars.

== Main works ==
=== Statue of Hector Berlioz ===
In 1886 a bronze statue of Berlioz had been erected in Paris' square Hector-Berlioz in the 9th arrondissement but this had been requisitioned by the Germans in 1941 and the bronze melted down for re-use. In 1948 a replacement had been sculpted in stone by Saupique.

=== Bust of Jacques Jaujard ===
Jacques Jaujard was a director of the Musées de France and Saupique's bronze bust of him is kept in the Musée du Louvre département des Sculptures.

=== "Normandie" ===
Saupique created several decorative works for the passageways of the ocean liner "Normandie" which was broken up in 1942. One bas-relief depicted the voyage of Eric the Red to Greenland, another the "Normans in Sicilly" and Odin Freya entering the Seine in a fleet of drakkars.

=== Le Monument néoceltique d’Étampes ===
The "Pergola de la Douce France" is located in the gardens of the Tour Guinette in Étampes and was part of a larger composition created in 1925 for the Exposition des Arts décoratifs et industriels. It was acquired by Étampes in 1934. The work comprises four large stone blocks on which sixteen bas-reliefs have been created by various sculptors. Saupique executed the reliefs "Le Saint Graal" and "L’Aurochs". The remaining reliefs include "Les serpents des druides" executed by members of Pierre Seguin's workshop, two works by Louis Nicot called "Le Cerf" and "Taliésin et Ganiéda", Pablo Manès "Lancelot et Guenièvre", "Le Cheval sauvage" by Georges Hilbert, Ossip Zadkine's "Le Dragon", Raoul Lamourdedieu's two works "Merlin et Viviane" and "Joseph d’Arimathie", Joachim Costa's three works called "Tristan et Iseult", " La fée Koridwen" and "Le nain Gwyon ", Jan and Joël Martel's "L’île d’Avalon" and "Le roi Arthur" and François Pompon's "Le Sanglier".

=== Monument to François Rabelais ===
This 1946 Saupique sculpture is in front of the Hôtel de Ville in Meudon. François Rabelais was the parish priest of Meudon from 1551 to 1553.

=== Villeneuve-sur-Lot Hôtel de ville ===
A good example of Saupique's bust of "Marianne" can be seen here.

=== "La bienvenue" ===
Saupique's statue of a woman holding flowers can be seen in Barentin.

=== Monument to Henri Bouchot in Besançon ===
This statue dates to 1907 and stands in the square Henri-Bouchot. It was originally in bronze but was melted down by the Vichy régime. A replacement in stone executed by Saupique.

=== Bust of Sergent Jules Bobillot ===
Sergent Bobillot had been badly injured in the siege of Tuyên Quang (Tonkin) in 1882 and finally died in Hanoi in 1885. His remains were returned to Paris in 1996.

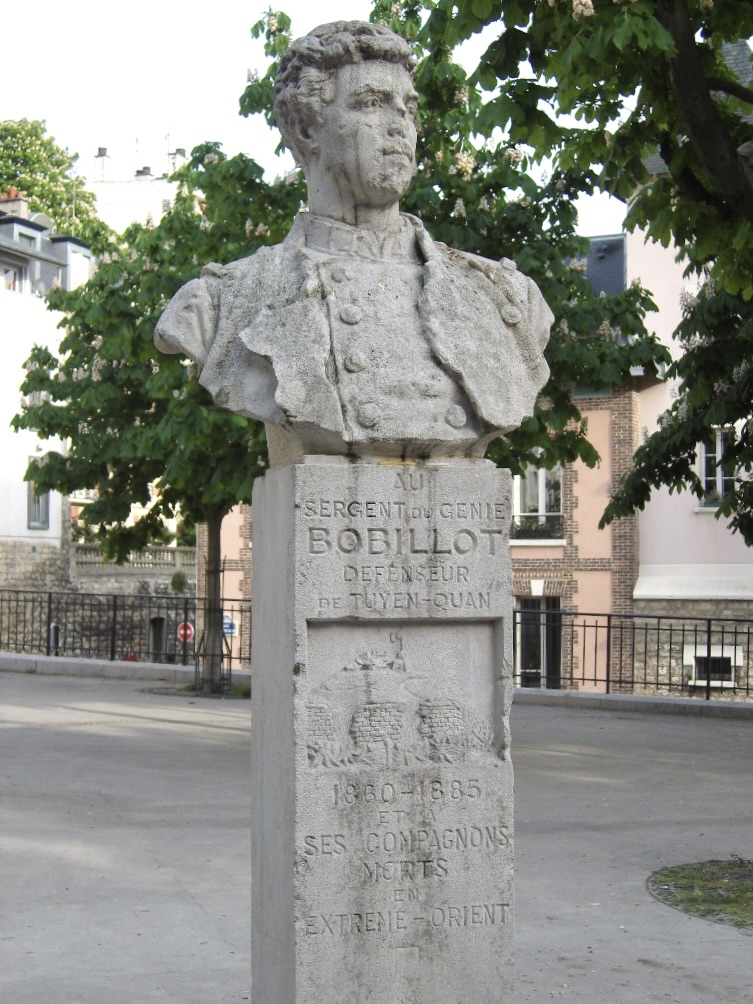
Sergent Jules Bobillot

In 1888 Auguste Paris had created a bust of Bobillot which was placed in Paris' place Paul Verlaine. This was destroyed by the Germans in 1942 during the occupation and Saupique executed a new bust in 1959.

=== Sculpture on Rouen's Pont Boieldieu ===
The Pont Boieldieu was rebuilt in 1955, connecting the rue Grand-Pont on the river's right bank with the rue St Sever on the left bank and two huge sculptures are positioned on each side of the bridge. Georges Saupique and Jean-Marie Baumel were the sculptors involved and worked on the compositions between 1956 and 1957. The sculptures recall Rouen's maritime history. Baumel's two sculptures are on the right side of the bridge and Saupique was responsible for the two on the left. Baumel's sculptures depict the Rouen navigator and explorer Cavelier de La Salle heading an expedition towards America and the Normans sailing towards England in a drakkar.. On the left side of the bridge are the two Saupique sculptures, one an allegory of the river entitled "Les affluents de la Seine" and the other an allegory of the sea entitled "Océan, père de l'aventure". Recently ten busts have been added to the bridge, these depicting great navigators of the past; (Jean de Béthencourt, Jacques Cartier, Cavelier de la Salle, Christophe Colomb, James Cook, Vasco de Gama, Ferdinand Magellan, Jean-François de Galaup, comte de Lapérouse, Marco Polo and Amerigo Vespucci, all works by the sculptor Jean-Marc de Pas. The bridge is the only Rouen bridge which is riveted rather than welded and it is located between the Pont Pierre-Corneille and the Pont Jeanne d’Arc. It was named after the Rouen born composer François Adrien Boieldieu.

=== The Vincennes Hôtel de ville ===
In 1933 Saupique was commissioned to work on one of three "dessus-de-porte" to be placed above the doors of the new "Salle des Fêtes" in the Hôtel de Ville. His composition involved allegorical figures representing commerce and industry supporting the Vincennes' coat of arms.

=== The bas-relief "Asia" Palais de Chaillot ===
Part of the reconstructed Palais de Chaillot for the 1937 Paris exhibition involved bas-reliefs on the blank walls and one of these is by Saupique. It can be seen on the wall facing the rue Franklin.

=== Bust of Marianne ===
To mark the start of the French Fourth Republic, a competition was held to have a bust of Marianne sculpted and Saupique was the winner. There are copies of the bust throughout France including the Hôtel de Ville in Poitiers.

=== Animal reliefs on 34 de la rue Pasquier in Paris ===
This building was built in 1929 in the Art Déco style by architects Alex and Pierre Fournier as the office of the Société financière française et coloniale and Saupique was commissioned to decorate the façade with reliefs of exotic animals including a camel, an elephant, a crocodile, a tiger and various birds. Another depicted fish in a fisherman's boat. The reliefs were executed in colored marble and Venetian enamel.

=== Gallery of images-34 Rue Pasquier ===
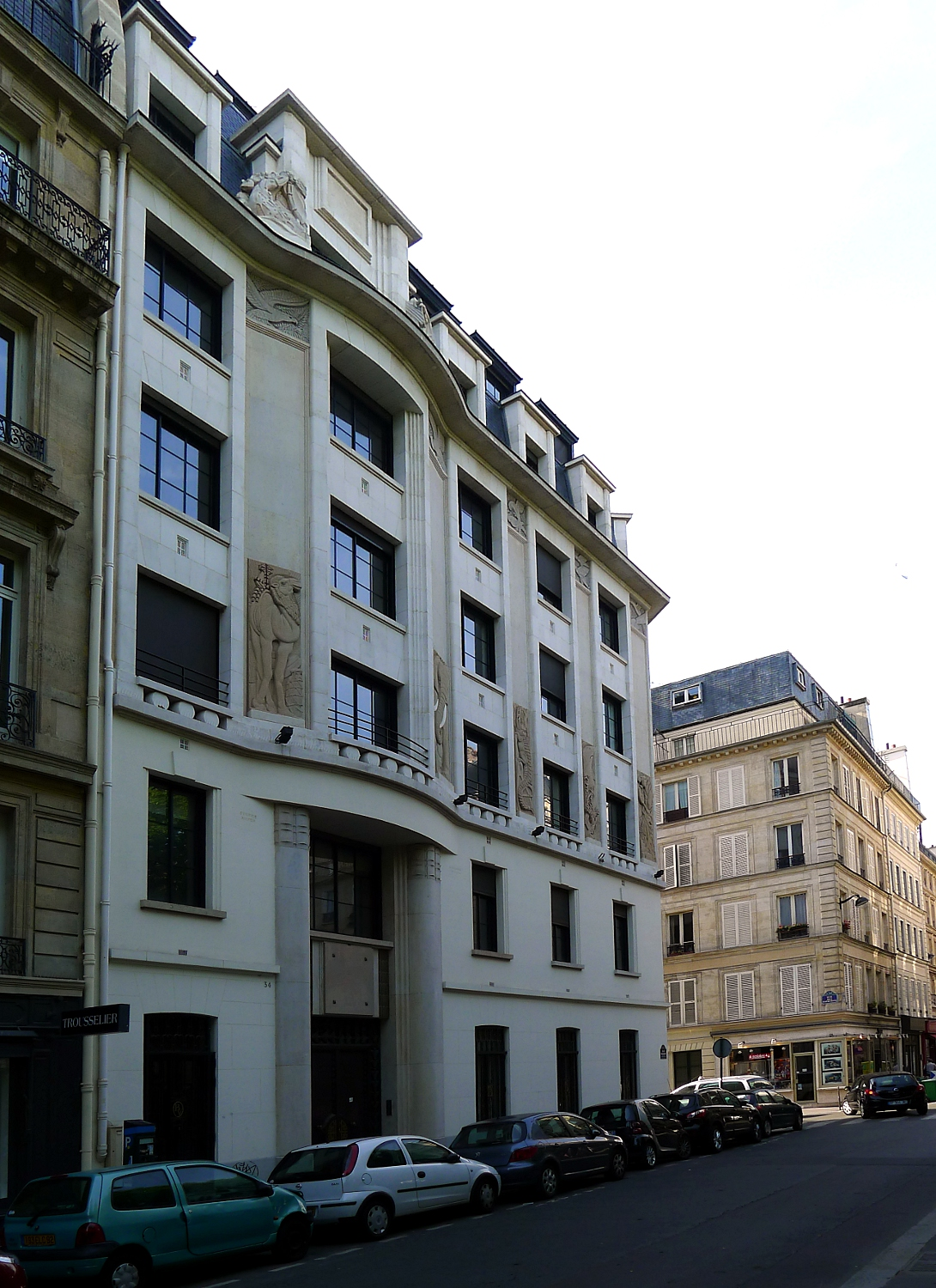

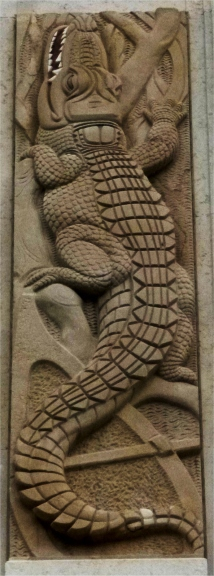
Saupique's crocodile

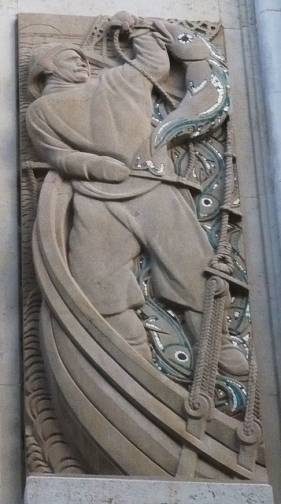
Fisherman in boat

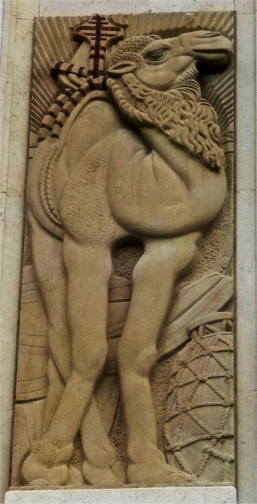

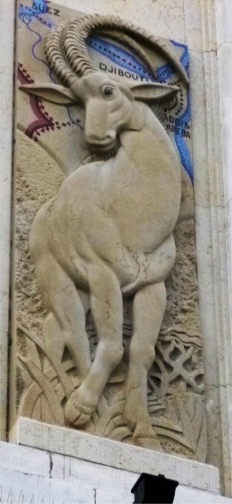

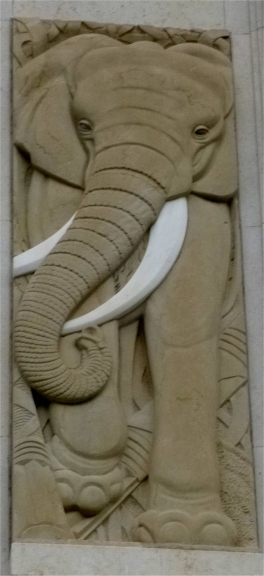

=== Mascaron (architecture) for the Damparis factory of Ets Jacob-Delafon ===
Saupigue created several mascarons for the exterior of the factory.

=== Le Havre railway station (gare du Port Autonome) ===
In 1952 Saupique carried out some sculptural decoration for this station but this was removed when further changes made in 1963.

== Works in churches and cathedrals ==
=== Chapel of St Guenole ===
Saupique's granite calvary can be seen at this Beg Meil church. The work dates to 1941.

=== Saint-Brieuc Cathedral ===
Saupique executed a "Chemin de Croix" and a depiction of the Assumption in 1958 for this cathedral. Both were in granite.

=== Église Saint-Germain d’Aix-Noulette ===
Saupique executed statues of St Barbara and St Nicholas for this church in 1937/1938.

=== Restoration work for Reims Cathedral ===
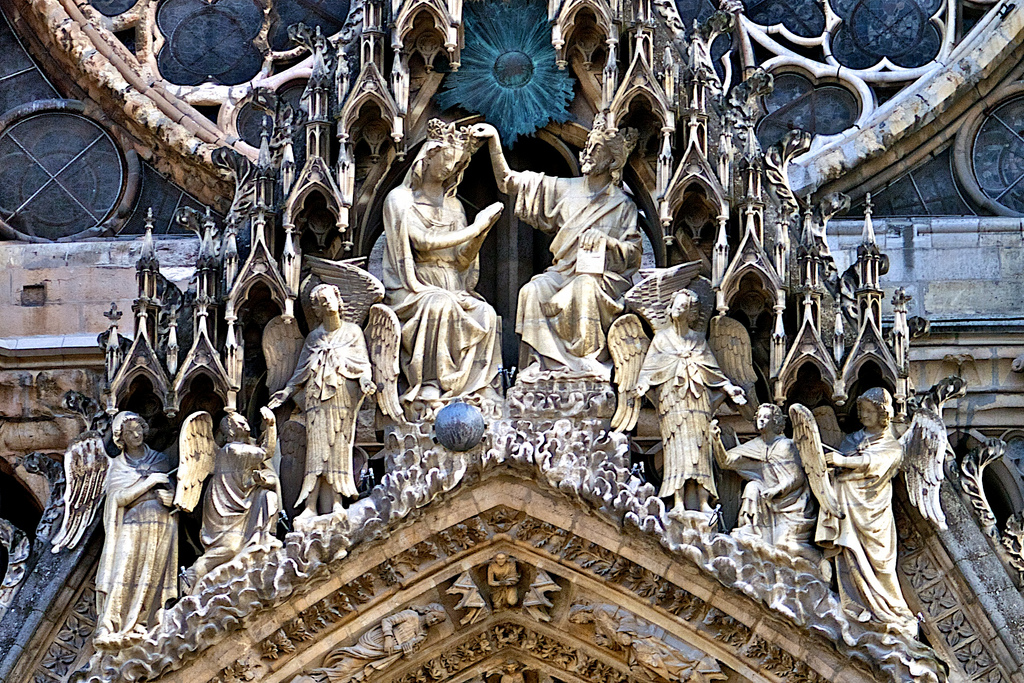
Saupique's copy of "Le Couronnement de la Vierge"

Reims Cathedral was badly damaged by German artillery fire in the 1914-1918 war! including the famous sculpture above the entrance "Le Couronnement de la Vierge". Many of the damaged sculptures from the cathedral can be seen in the Palais du Tau. In 1955 Saupique made a copy of "Le Couronnement de la Vierge" which can be seen above the cathedral entrance and with Louis Leygue copied many of the other sculptures on the cathedral facade. He also executed a statue of St Thomas for the north tower.

=== Arras Cathedral ===
Saupique worked on the cathedral's main altar and the tomb of Mgr Julien, Évêque d'Arras.

=== "Jeanne au bûcher" in Rouen cathedral ===
Saupique completed this statue in 1956. It depicts Joan of Arc at the stake.

=== Église de l'assomption de la Tres Sainte Vierge at Milon-la-Chapelle ===
Saupique's bas-relief entitled "la résurrection des poilus" in this church serves as Milon-la-Chapelle's war memorial.

=== Tympanum on Église du Sacré-Coeur in Gentilly ===
Between 1933 and 1936, this catholic church was built mainly to serve the students of the nearby Cité Universitaire. The architect was Pierre Pacquet. Saupique carried out the sculptural decoration involved, mainly a tympanum and other declaration around the main entrance door. The church no longer serves the university but since 1979 has served Paris' Portuguese community. Saupique's composition for the tympanum is a Christ in Majesty surrounded by the four "Doctors of the church" Saints Ambrose, Augustine of Hippo, Jerome and Pope Gregory I known as Gregory the Great. Around the church entrance Saupique also executed 12 bas-reliefs on 12 panels these depicting:-

1. Charlemagne and Alcuin

2. St Bernard

3. Albertus Magnus and Thomas Aquinas

4. St Bonaventure

5. St Ignatius and St François Xavier

6. Frédéric Ozanam

7. St Louis and Robert de Sorbon

8. Suger

9. Hugh of Saint Victor

10. Jean Gerson

11. St François de Sales and Jean-Jacques Olier

12. Jean Baptiste Henri Lacordaire

and around these panels are larger reliefs depicting 8 scenes from Jesus' life, four on each side: the Annonciation, the Visitation, the Nativity, the Presentation in the Temple the last supper, he garden of olives, Jesus before Pontius Pilate and the crucifixion. Further bas-reliefs celebrate the churches benefactors with depictions of Marguerite Lebaudy with St George and St Marguerite, Pierre Lebaudy with St Peter and St Michael and an angel and various musical instruments. Finally Saupique carved 4 huge winged angels which stand on each corner of the bell tower. For the same church Saupique executed a Sacré-Coeur.

== War memorials ==
=== Signy-l'Abbaye War Memorial ===
Saupique was the sculptor of this memorial.

=== Lycée Henri IV War Memorial ===
This school is located in the rue Clovis in Paris' 5th arrondissement. The limestone memorial dedicated to the ex-pupils of the school who died in the 1914-1918 war was erected in 1921.

=== Montmirail War Memorial ===
The architects of this 1922 memorial to the dead of 1914-1918 were Fernand Gallot and Eugène Salle. Saupique's sculpture was first shown at the 1922 Salon de la Société des Artistes Français. At the rear of the memorial is a bas-relief depicting a griefing woman.

=== Mémorial de la France Combattante ===
This memorial is located at Suresnes. It was at Mont Valérien that the Germans shot more than a thousand resistance fighters and hostages between 1940 and 1944 and as part of this memorial are 16 allegorical reliefs in bronze by various sculptors these referring to various acts of heroism during the Second World War. Saupique's bronze refers to the Casabiance submarine which escaped from the German occupied Toulon harbor on 27 November 1942 and became a symbol of the Free French Naval Forces (FNFL). He depicts a man struggling against an octopus.

=== Meymac War Memorial ===
The adjudicating committee established to organize Meymac's war memorial received three maquettes from Saupique and chose the work entitled "Le semeur de lauriers" in which a soldier places a sprig of laurel on the grave of a dead comrade.

=== The Langres War Memorial ===
Known also as the "monument du Souvenir", the memorial stands in Langres' place de Verdun. executed in the art-déco style, the memorial consists of a base which is inscribed with the names of the men of Langres who died fighting for France in the two World Wars. On this base Saupique's sculpture depicts 4 large calibre mortars between which are bas-reliefs depicting scenes from 1914 to 1918. At each end are allegorical statues One represents history and clutches to her chest a book containing descriptions of the events the memorial covers whilst the other represents the river Marne recalling the September 1914 battle fought in the river area. At the very top of the memorial a figure representing France herself holds a dead soldier wrapped in a shroud.The monument is of Euville stone, was inaugurated in 1922, and was the joint work of Saupique and Aristide Rousaud.

=== The Leclerc monument in Strasbourg ===
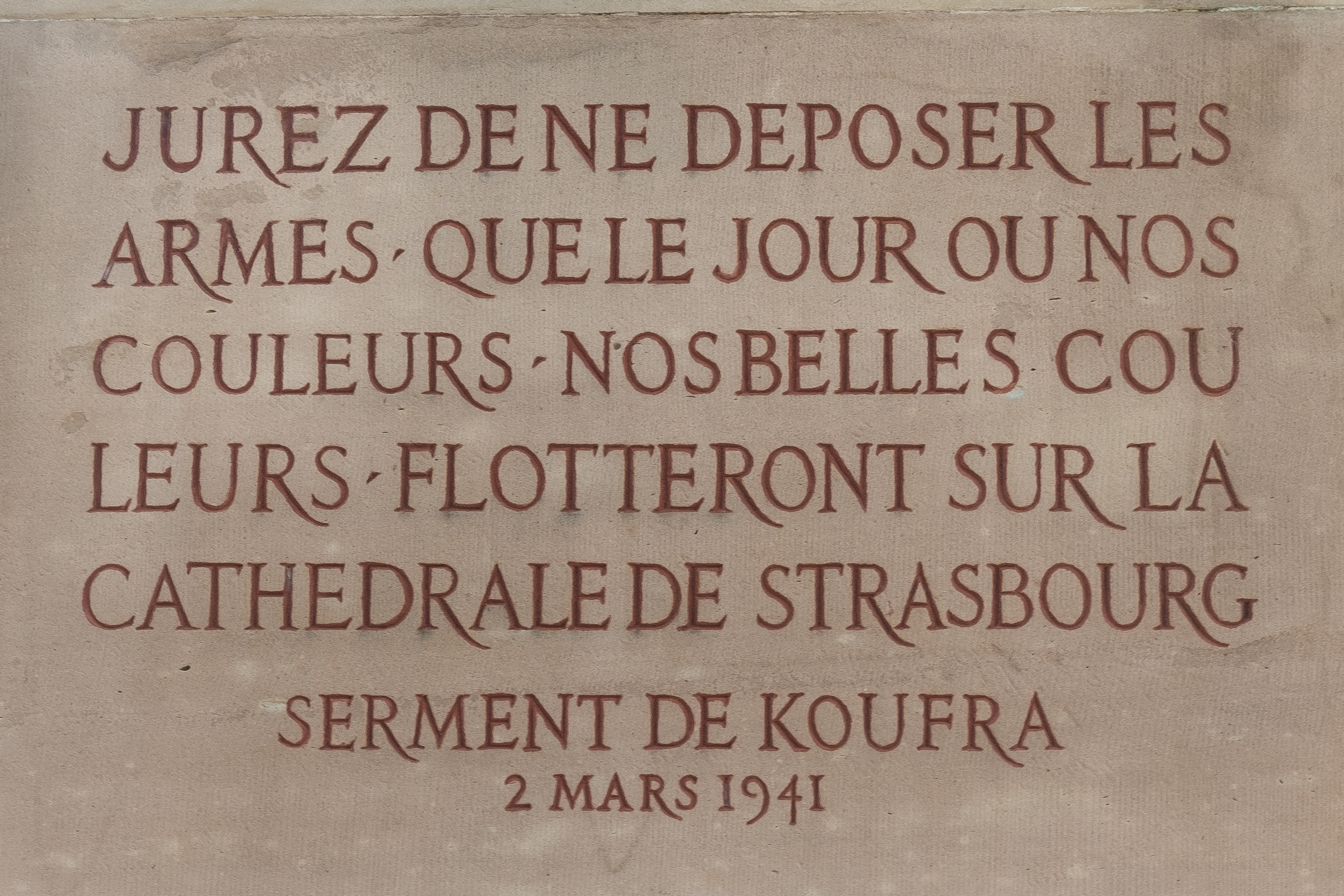
Leclerc' declaration at Koufra

Saupique's work on this monument dates to 1951. It celebrates the . La 2ème Division Blindée's liberation of 23 November 1944 a liberation with Leclerc had promised in 1941. The monument also carries Leclerc's words at Koufra on 1 March 1941

"Jurez de ne déposer les armes que lorsque nos couleurs, nos belles couleurs flotteront sur la cathédrale de Strasbourg"

and is also inscribed

"Inscriptions on the plinth: G. Saupique scp. J.P. Paquet arc. and under the statue AU / GENERAL / LECLERC / LIBERATEUR / DE / STRASBOURG / XXIII / NOVEMBRE / MCMXLIV / MORT / EN SERVICE / COMMANDE / LE 28 NOV. 1947 / MARECHAL / DE FRANCE / LE 23 AOUT 1952; à l’arrière : LE TCHAD / 1940 / KOUFRA / 1941 / LE FEZZAN / 1942 / TRIPOLITAINE / TUNISIE / 1943 / PARIS / ET / STRASBOURG / 1944 / JUREZ DE DEPOSER LES / ARMES QUE LE JOUR OU NOS / COULEURS NOS BELLES COU / LEURS FLOTTERONT SUR LA / CATHEDRALE DE STRASBOURG / SERMENT DE KOUFRA / 2 MARS 1941"

=== The "Calvaire des Marins" in Boulogne-sur-Mer ===
As a tribute to all the Boulogne-sur-Mer sailors killed in the war a Calvary was erected in 1947 and called the "Calvaire des Marins". Saupique sculpted the figure of Christ involved, this cast in bronze.

== Design drawings ==
The Musée du Louvre département des Arts graphiques hold several of Saupique's drawings including "Femme voilée, dont les mains tiennent le sexe d'un homme", "Femme nue, assise, de face", "Etude pour un Christ en Croix" and "Homme caressant une femme".
