= SFFC =

SFFC may refer to:

- South Fremantle Football Club
- Sporting Fingal F.C.
- Supercat Fast Ferry Corporation
- Swanley Furness F.C.
- Société financière française et coloniale
