= Adam Sieff =

British music consultant

- Born: April 1954 (age 72)
- Education: Westminster School
- Occupation: Music industry executive
- Parent(s): Joseph "Teddy" Sieff & Lois Sieff

Adam Michael Sieff (born April 1954) is a British music consultant and former head of jazz for the UK and Europe for Sony Music. He was head of sales and marketing for Gearbox Records which specialises in the release of previously unheard jazz recordings. As of April 2017 he is creative consultant for Margate Jazz. He is the son of Teddy Sieff, the Marks and Spencer heir.

== Early life ==
Adam Sieff was born in April 1954 to Joseph "Teddy" Sieff, president of the retailers Marks and Spencer, and his wife Lois Sieff. He was educated at Westminster School (1967–71) where his contemporaries included the journalist Tom Utley and Michael Zilkha, the co-founder of ZE Records. While at Westminster he was the lead guitarist in a band known as Jaded that was managed by the future British prime minister Tony Blair.

== Career ==
Sieff was a freelance musician and producer until 1991 and then jazz manager at Tower Records until February 1995. He joined Sony Music in March 1995 as head of jazz and became director of jazz for the United Kingdom and Europe in 2002 until he left them in February 2005. He was then with SellaBand from 2006 to 2010 and Tomorrow's Warriors from 2010 to 2012. He was a non-executive director of Jazz FM. In 2011, he won the "Unsung Hero" Award at the Music Producers Guild Awards. In November 2012, he joined Gearbox Records where he was head of sales and marketing until January 2017 since when he has been a consultant for them. The company specialises in the release on vinyl of audiophile editions of previously unheard jazz recordings. Since April 2017 he has been creative consultant for Margate Jazz. He presents a weekly jazz programme on Deal Radio called Jazz On The Beach.
