= Anglo-French Financial Commission =

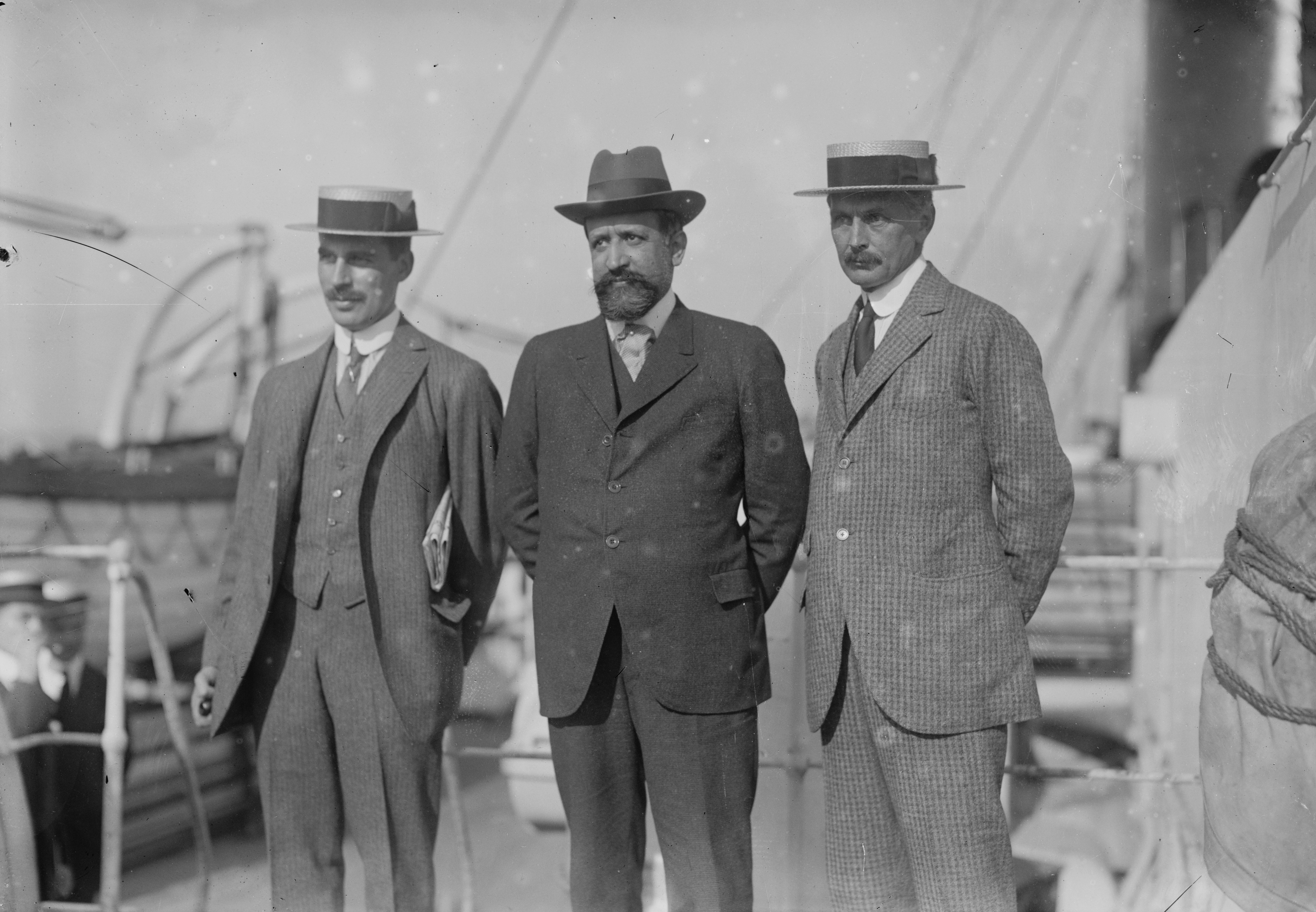
Basil Phillott Blackett, Octave Homberg and Ernest Mallet arriving in New York City in 1915 as part of the Commission.

The Anglo-French Financial Commission was a special delegation to the United States from the governments of the United Kingdom and France in 1915 during the First World War. The Commission, led by Lord Reading, secured the single largest loan from private US banks prior to American entry into World War I in 1917.

== History ==
In February 1915, France, Britain and Russia held the first joint financial conference of the First World War. Thereafter, the Allied Powers agreed to cooperate closely in financial matters to help finance the ongoing war with Germany. In September 1915 France and the United Kingdom signed an agreement to establish the Inter-Allied Munitions Bureau, which was to coordinate purchasing in all neutral countries, principally the United States. That same month Lord Reading led a delegation from the two countries to secure a huge loan from private American banks, the source of the greatest amount of private capital outside Europe. The Commission included Basil Blackett, Sir Edward Holden and Sir Henry Babington Smith from Britain, and Octave Homberg and Ernest Mallet from France. In addition to the financial support, it was hoped that a large investment by Americans in the Allied war effort would encourage Woodrow Wilson's administration to abandon neutrality.

The group arrived in New York on 10 September, and were met by J. P. Morgan Jr., who had been designated as Britain's sole purchasing agent in the United States in January 1915, and Britain's ambassador, Sir Cecil Spring Rice. Over the course of the following weeks, the Commission had meetings with approximately one hundred prominent American financiers and bankers, including Charles G. Dawes. Several Jewish financial houses stated they would not participate if Russia, the location of recent anti-Jewish pogroms, was included in the agreement. On 28 September 1915 it was announced that the syndicate, led by J.P. Morgan & Co., had reached a credit agreement with the British and French governments. The loan was for $500,000,000, at that point by far the largest single loan in financial history. The loan was issued on five-year, 5 per cent joint British and French bonds, and was entirely controlled by banking corporations for private gain.

Prior to the loan being secured, German agents and sympathisers in the United States endeavoured to prevent an agreement. On 16 September American press reported that the lives of the Commission's delegates had been threatened by German plots, and that pro-Germans were threatening to "cause a run on the banks throughout the United States if any support is accorded to the Allies". On 18 September The Spectator reported that the Germans were attempting to influence American depositors and the directors of major banks, and were trying to arrange a counter-loan of $100,000,000 to Germany to embarrass the negotiations. The US government, under pressure from Spring Rice and still officially neutral, stated that it regarded the loan as an ordinary financial transaction and that it would not interfere in the process. American press generally supported the loan, and The New York Times decried opponents of the agreement as "anti-American". Financier James J. Hill hailed the loan as marking the moment that America changed "from being a debtor to a creditor nation". German efforts to influence the proceedings proved to be fruitless.

In May 1916 the British had to take over the financing of French purchases in the United States as a result of the weakness of the French wartime economy.
