= Hôtel de Ville, Vincennes =

Town hall in Vincennes, France

Hôtel de Ville
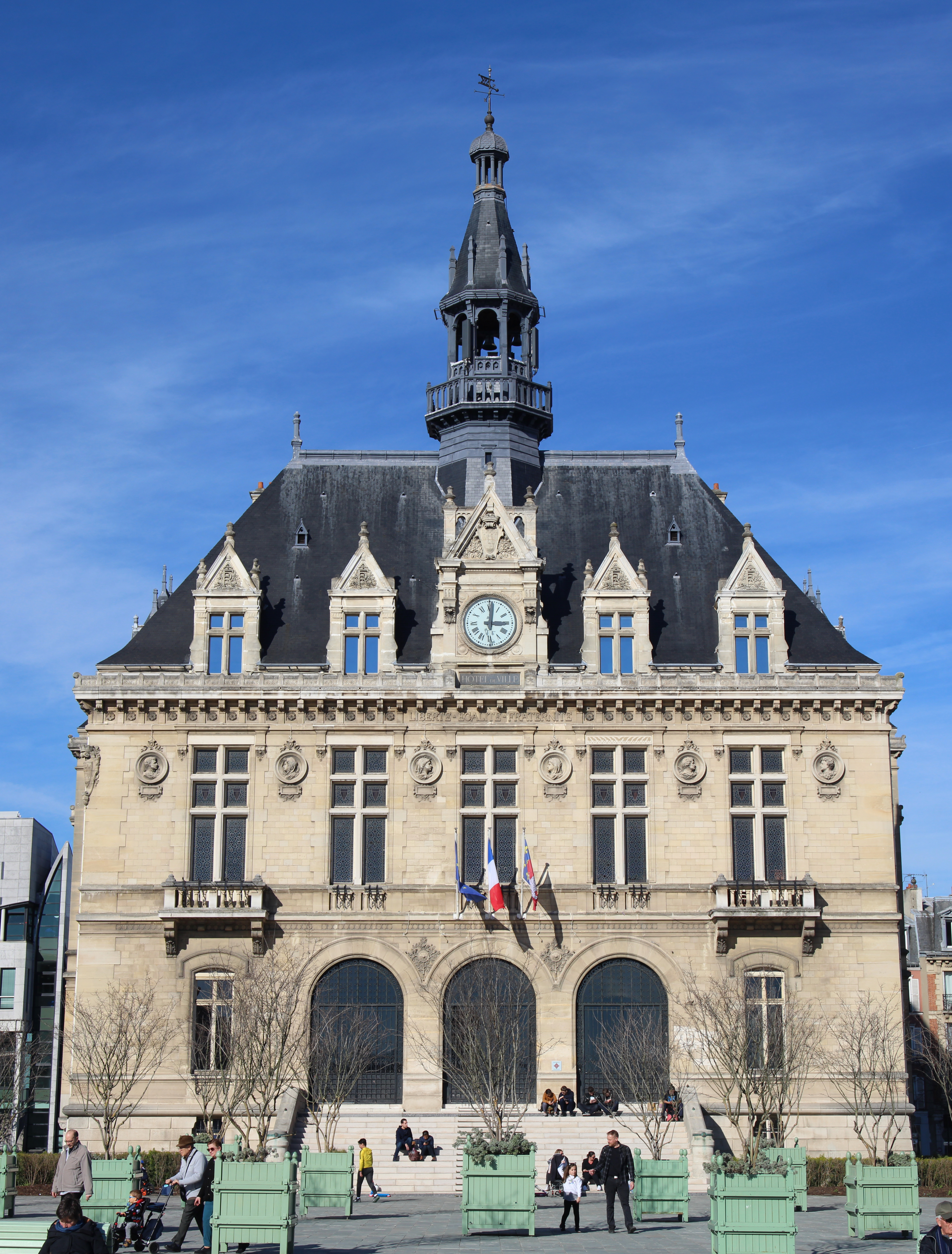
- The main frontage of the Hôtel de Ville in February 2019

General information
- Type: City hall
- Architectural style: Renaissance Revival style
- Location: Vincennes, France
- Coordinates: 48.8477°N 2.4397°E
- Completed: 1891

Design and construction
- Architect: Eugène Calinaud

Monument historique
- Official name: Hôtel de ville de Vincennes
- Type: Inscrit
- Designated: 2000
- Reference no.: PA94000011

The Hôtel de Ville (French pronunciation: [otɛl də vil], City Hall) is a municipal building in Vincennes, Val-de-Marne, in the eastern suburbs of Paris, standing on Place du Général Leclerc. It was designated a monument historique by the French government in 2000.

== History ==
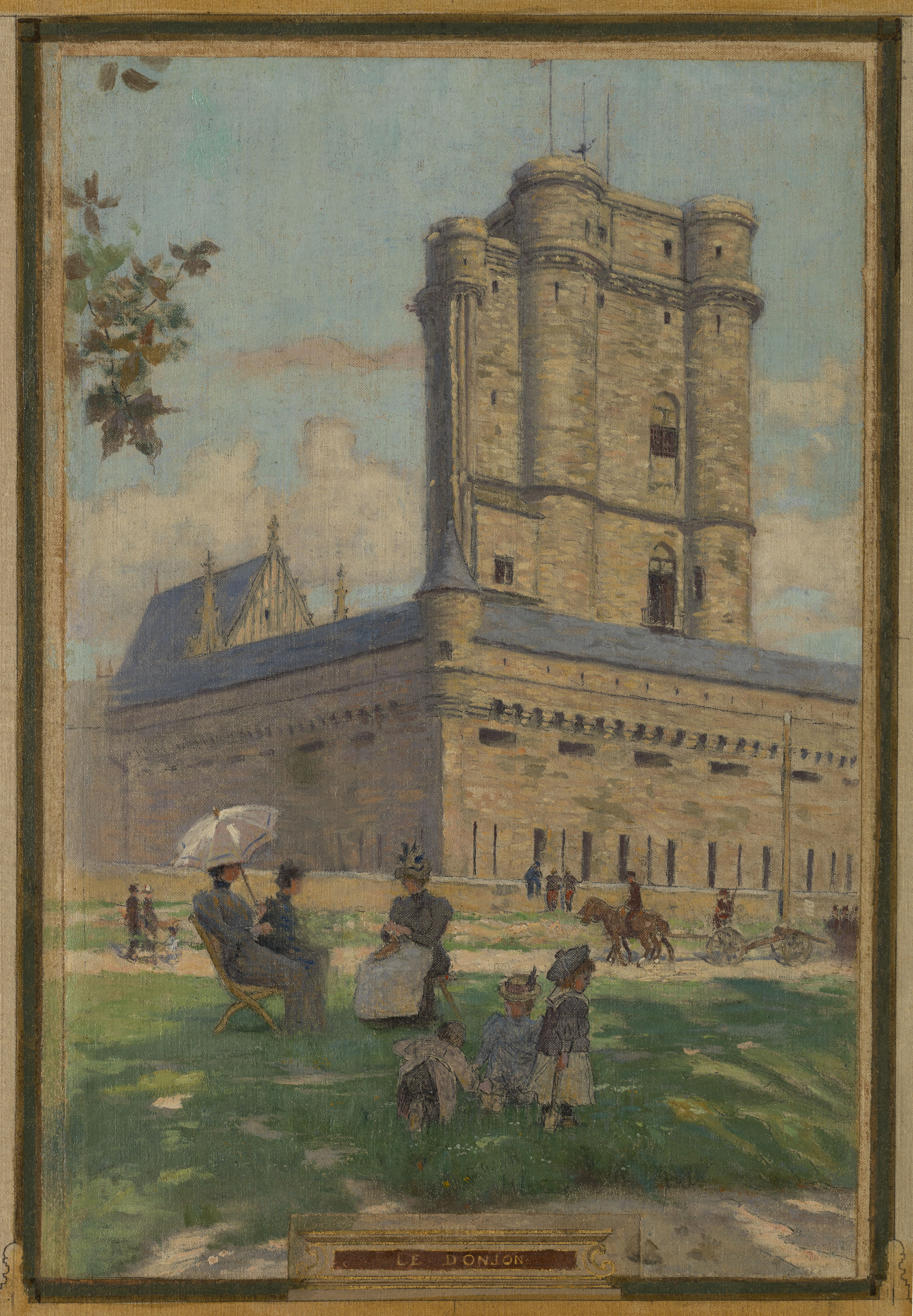
One of the murals painted by Maurice Chabas

After the French Revolution, meetings of the town council were initially held in the house of the mayor at the time. However, in the mid-19th century, the town council decided to establish a dedicated town hall. The site they selected was on the corner of Avenue du Château and Rue Lejemptel. The building was designed by Jacques Jean Clerget and was completed in 1852.

Following significant population growth in the second half of the 19th century, the council decided to commission a more substantial town hall. Construction of the new building started in 1887. It was designed by Eugène Calinaud in the Renaissance Revival style, built in ashlar stone and was officially opened by the mayor, Louis Besquel, on 25 October 1891. The design involved a symmetrical main frontage of five bays facing south onto what is now Place du Général Leclerc. There was a short flight of steps leading up to three round headed openings with moulded surrounds and iron grills. On the first floor, the three central bays were fenestrated by large mullioned and transomed windows with cornices. The outer bays were fenestrated by segmental headed windows with hood moulds on the ground floor, and by large mullioned and transomed windows with balconies and cornices on the first floor. At roof level, there was a frieze, a modillioned cornice, a central clock with an ornate surround, and dormer windows in the other bays. Behind the clock, there was a steep roof and an octagonal belfry.

Internally, the principal room was the Salle des Fêtes (ballroom), which was decorated six murals of local scenes, painted by Maurice Chabas in the symbolist style in 1902. They depicted the keep at the Château de Vincennes, the town gate, the obelisk in the Bois de Vincennes, the artillery ground, the Marne Valley and the town hall. On the opposite wall the council installed a huge mural, also by Chabas, depicting Lac Daumesnil. There was also a sculpture by Georges Saupique, which was placed dessus-de-porte (over the door) in 1933; it involved allegorical figures representing commerce and industry supporting the coat of arms of the town.

Following further population growth in the early 20th century, the council decided to extend the building to the north. The work, which was undertaken to a design by Henri Quarez and Gustave Lapostolle in a similar style, doubled the size of the complex and established a new frontage on Rue de Fontenay. Internally, the extension works also introduced a new grand staircase with a huge stained glass dome measuring 12.2 meters (40 ft) in diameter. The enlarged complex was officially opened by the Prime Minister of France, Pierre-Étienne Flandin, on 25 March 1935.

During the Second World War, the mayor, Léon Bonvoisin, stood on the steps of the town hall on 26 August 1944 and announced the liberation of the town by the French 2nd Armoured Division, commanded by General Philippe Leclerc. After the crowd had sung La Marseillaise, he led them from the town hall to the Château de Vincennes, to commemorate the lives of 26 members of the French Resistance, who had been executed there by German soldiers six days earlier.
