= Political and Economic Planning =

British think tank

Political and Economic Planning (PEP) was a British policy think tank, formed in 1931 in response to Max Nicholson's article A National Plan for Britain published in February of that year in Gerald Barry's magazine The Week-End Review.

== History ==
The original members included Nicholson and Barry, the zoologist Julian Huxley, the agronomist Leonard Elmhirst, the financier Basil Phillott Blackett, the civil servants Dennis Routh and Sir Henry Bunbury, the research chemist Michael Zvegintzov, and Israel Sieff, a director of Marks & Spencer. Sieff was chairman in the 1930s, followed by Elmhirst in 1939 and by Nicholson in 1953. It was a non-governmental planning organisation financed by corporations.

This prolific organisation was influential in the formation of the National Health Service, World War II and post-war planning, and the development of the African colonies. After the war it shared the offices of The Nature Conservancy in Belgrave Square, London, producing reports such as Opportunities in Industry (1957) and Advisory Committees in British Government (1960)

In 1978 PEP merged with the Centre for the Study of Social Policy (CSSP), and became the Policy Studies Institute (PSI).

== Chairmen ==
- 1931—1939: Israel Sieff
- 1939—1953: Leonard Elmhirst
- 1953—1978: Max Nicholson

== See also ==
- Planisme
