= Ernest Mallet =

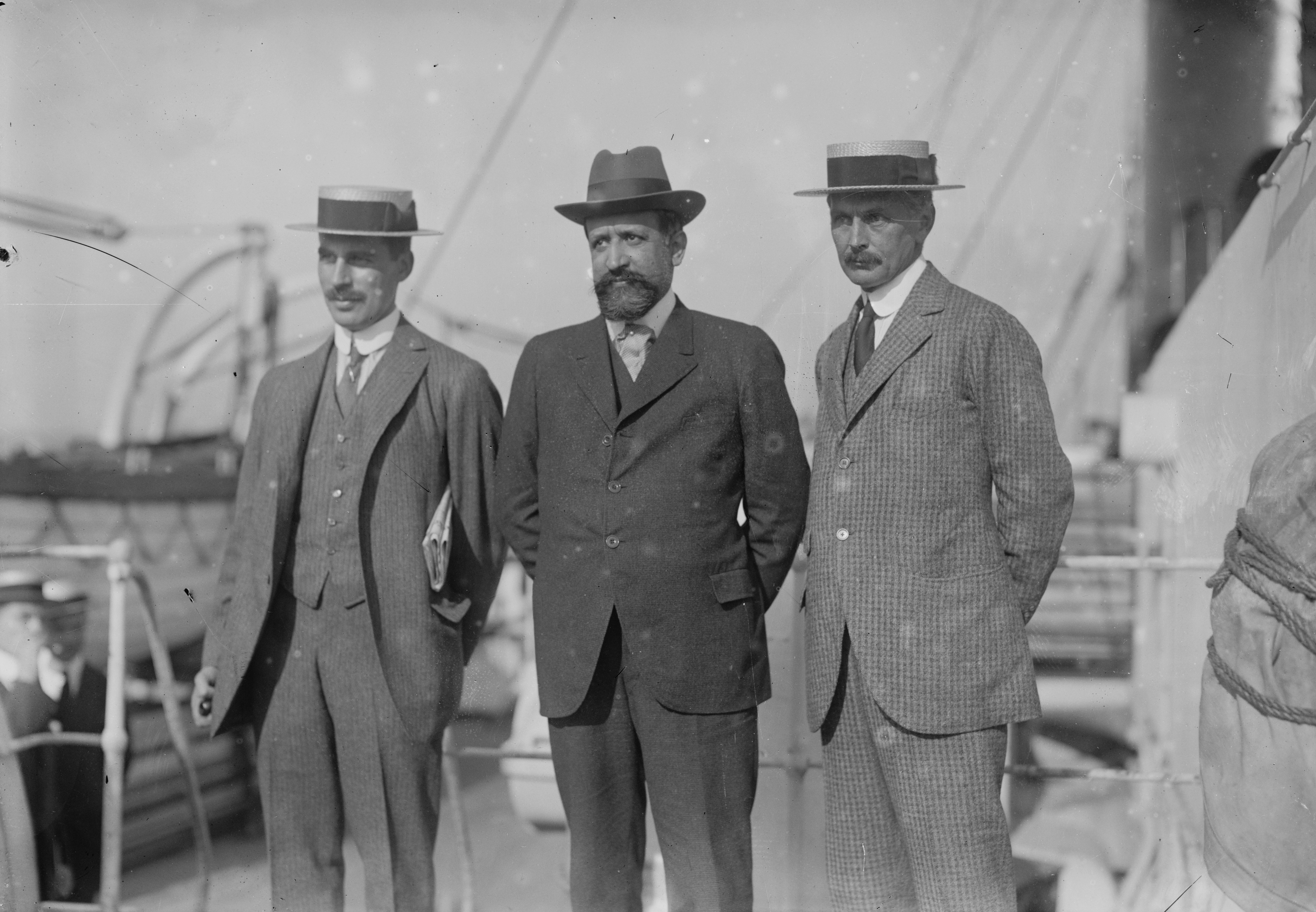
Basil Phillott Blackett and Octave Homberg and Ernest Mallet in 1915 arriving in New York City to appeal for financial aid

Ernest Mallet (June 10, 1863 – December 5, 1956) was a regent of the Bank of France and a member of the Anglo-French Financial Commission during World War I.

== Biography ==
He was born on June 10, 1863, in the 8th arrondissement of Paris. He married in London on May 28, 1905, Mabil St-Aubyn.

In 1915, he was part of the Anglo-French Financial Commission, which negotiated a $500 million loan for France and Britain from the United States.

He died on December 5, 1956, in the 16th arrondissement of Paris.
