= Basil Blackett (civil servant) =

British civil servant

Basil Phillott Blackett
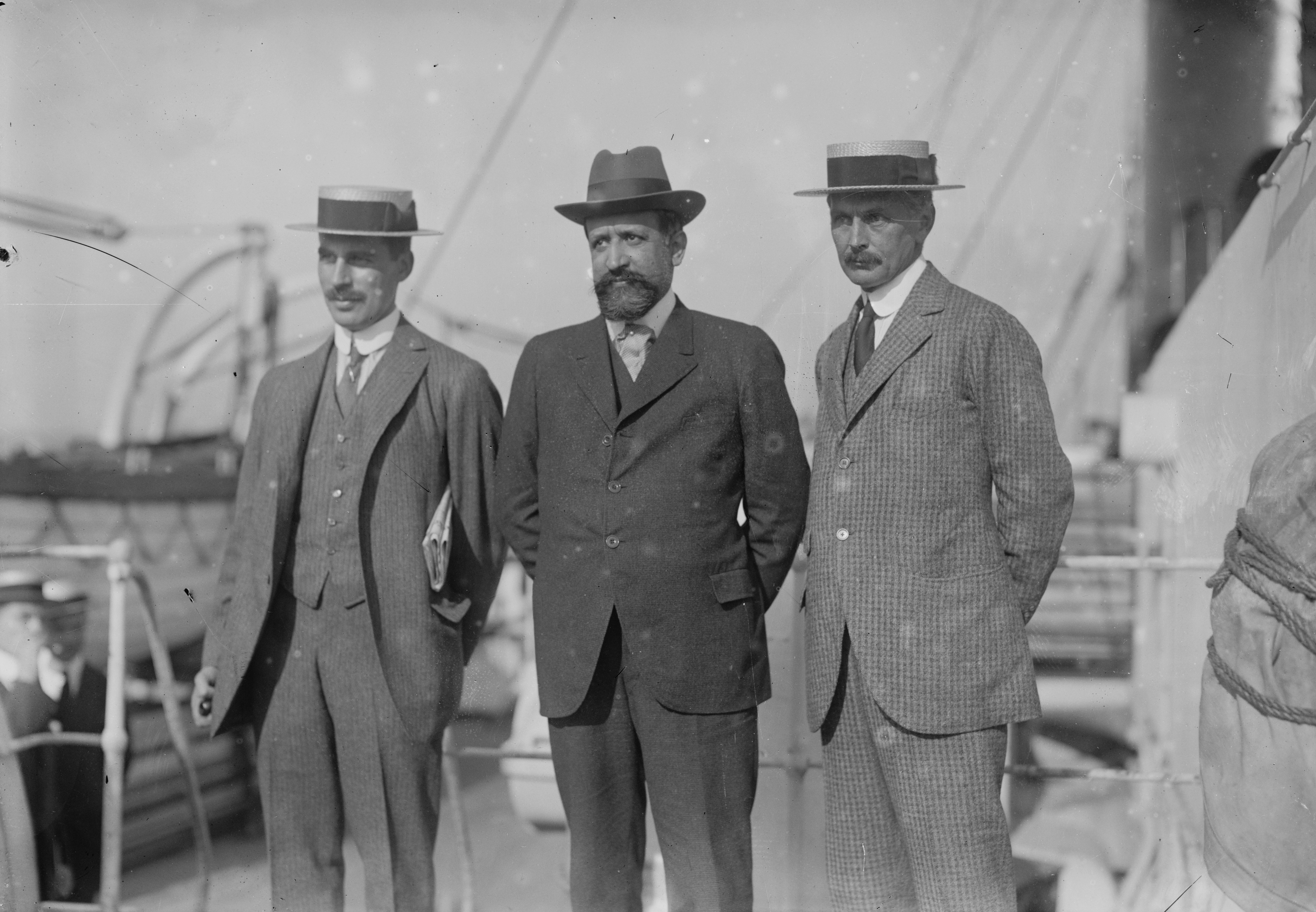
- Basil Blackett, Octave Homberg and Ernest Mallet in 1915
- Born: 8 January 1882; Calcutta, India
- Died: 15 August 1935 (aged 53); Marburg, Germany
- Education: Marlborough College; University College, Oxford
- Parent(s): William Blackett; Grace Phillott

Sir Basil Phillott Blackett KCB KCSI (8 January 1882 – 15 August 1935) was a British civil servant and expert on international finance.

== Biography ==
Blackett was the eldest son of Rev. William Blackett, a missionary and educationalist in India and his wife Grace Phillott. He was born in Calcutta and educated at Marlborough College. At Marlborough, he injured his leg badly, and while he recuperated, he spent some time in Germany and acquired a lifelong interest in the country. He then went to University College, Oxford on a scholarship.

Basil Blackett entered the civil service in 1904 and chose the Treasury, instead of the Indian Service, as he had originally intended. He was in the financial division and was secretary to the Royal Commission on Indian Finance and Currency (1913–1914) when the First World War broke out. He went to America for the first time in October 1914 in connection with foreign exchange matters and was made a Companion of the Bath (CB) in the 1915 New Year Honours. He was a member of the Anglo-French Financial Commission, which went to America in 1915 and so when the United States entered the war in 1917, he was seen as the natural choice to represent HM Treasury in Washington. He held the post from 1917 to 1919, and on his return in 1919, he became First Controller of Finance at the Treasury. He was made Knight Commander of the Bath (KCB) in 1921.

In 1922, he went to India as finance member of the Viceroy's Executive Council. Over the next five years, he was seen to be an outstanding financial administrator, and within a year, he had initiated and put through three major financial reforms. He put the Indian railways on an independent footing, concentrated the charges for the public debt into a statutory sinking fund, and set up a conference bringing together the eight provincial finance members for the first time to compare and co-ordinate their problems. He became involved in political questions and applied the same principles of conference and co-ordination to them. He taught himself the art of debating, although he was not a natural, and came to lead the legislative assembly in which he introduced six successive budgets. He was made Knight Commander of the Order of the Star of India (KCSI) in 1926 in recognition of his achievements.

Blackett returned to England in 1928 and left the Treasury for the City. His friend Montagu Norman, then governor of the Bank of England, sponsored his election to the court of directors, and he became chairman of the new Imperial and International Communications Limited. He was a member of the international committee on reparations, which produced the Young Plan in 1929. He responded to the crisis of 1931 and the sterling devaluation in a progressive way and became increasingly involved in national problems. He shared the views of John Maynard Keynes with regard to planned money and to budgeting for a deficit. He was a proponent of the sterling area and popularised the phrase. He was founding president of Political and Economic Planning in 1931 and was once president of the British Social Hygiene Council.

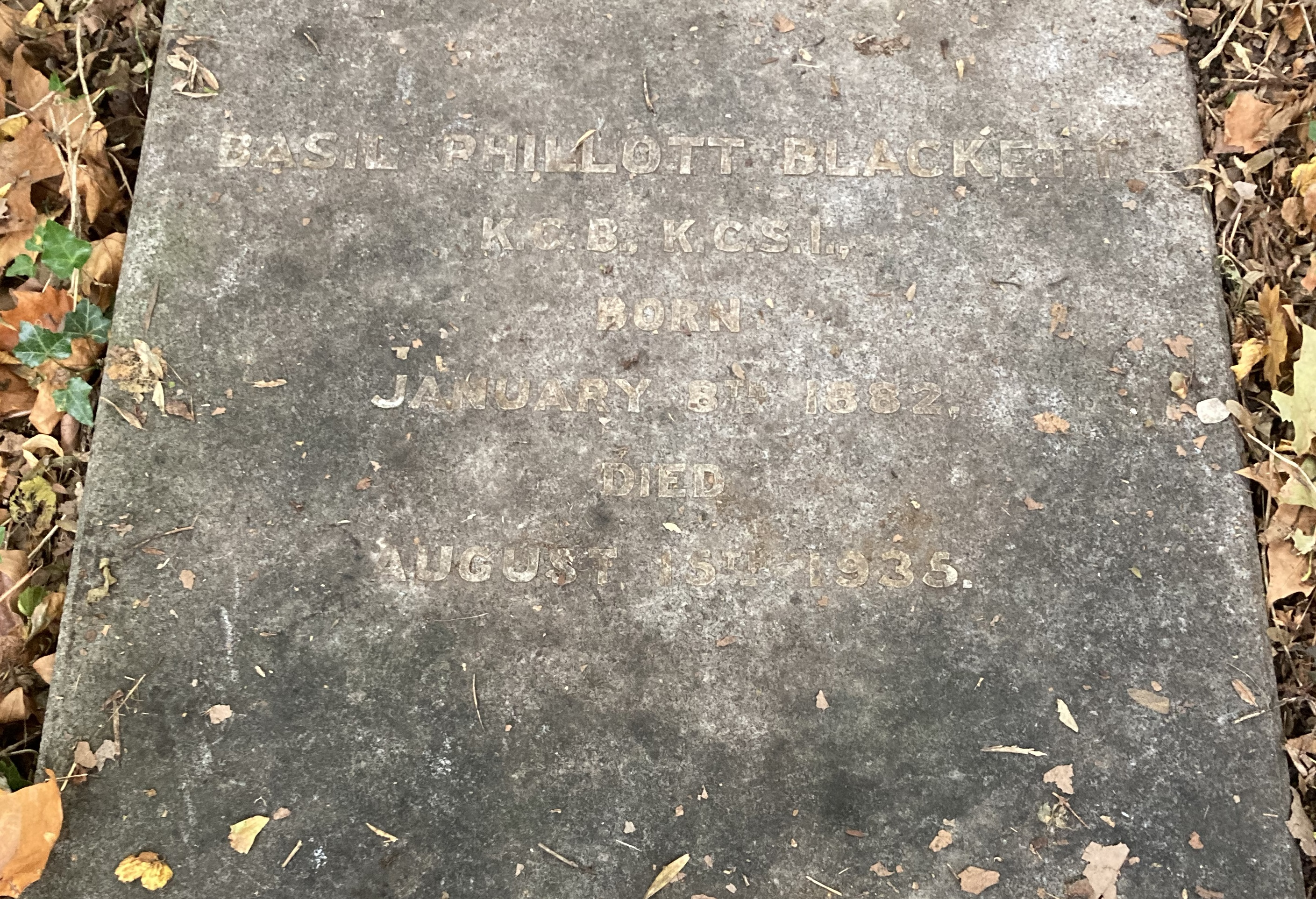
Grave of Sir Basil Blackett in Highgate Cemetery

He stood as an unofficial Conservative candidate for parliament for St Marylebone in 1932 but was not elected. In the same year, he left Imperial and International Communications Limited and joined the board of De Beers Consolidated Mines.

In August 1935, Blackett died in Marburg where he was taken to after his car was hit by a train in the Lumda valley in Germany on his way to giving a lecture at Heidelberg University. In his will, he bequeathed the balance of his estate to the public trustee to be used for various purposes with "one third of any surplus to go to the Commissioners for the reduction of the National Debt".

He was buried on the western side of Highgate Cemetery. There is a memorial window to him in the west window of the north transept of Durham Cathedral, and Marlborough College's Observatory is named the Blackett Observatory after him.

Blackett was twice married but had no children. His wife Beatrice Bonner was an American, daughter of Edward H. Bonner of Staten Island. He was a second cousin of the physicist Patrick Blackett, Baron Blackett, a great-nephew of the Australian architect Edmund Blacket and a second cousin, three times removed, of the Australian poet David Musgrave.

== Publications ==
- Planned Money 1932
