= Joseph Sieff =

English businessman (1905–1982)

Joseph Edward Sieff (28 November 1905 – 4 November 1982), also known as Teddy Sieff, was an English businessman and Zionist. He was chairman of retailer Marks & Spencer and honorary vice-president of the British Zionist Federation.

Sieff worked at M&S for much of his career, as did his brother Israel Sieff. Teddy succeeded Israel as chairman in 1967, serving until 1972. He was succeeded as chairman by Israel's son Marcus Sieff.

In 1973, Teddy Sieff survived an assassination attempt by the Popular Front for the Liberation of Palestine. On 30 December, PFLP assassin Ilich Ramírez Sánchez (aka Carlos the Jackal) called on Sieff's home on Queen's Grove in St John's Wood and ordered the maid to take him to Sieff. Finding Sieff in the bathroom, in his bathtub, Carlos fired one bullet at Sieff from his Tokarev 7.62mm pistol, which bounced off Sieff just between his nose and upper lip and knocked him unconscious; the gun then jammed and Carlos fled. The assassination attempt is depicted in the 2010 miniseries/film Carlos, with an actor portraying Sieff. Archive footage of an interview with Sieff himself is also included in the miniseries/film.
