= Rebecca Sieff =

British Zionist and feminist (1890–1966)

Rebecca Sieff OBE
- רבקה סיף
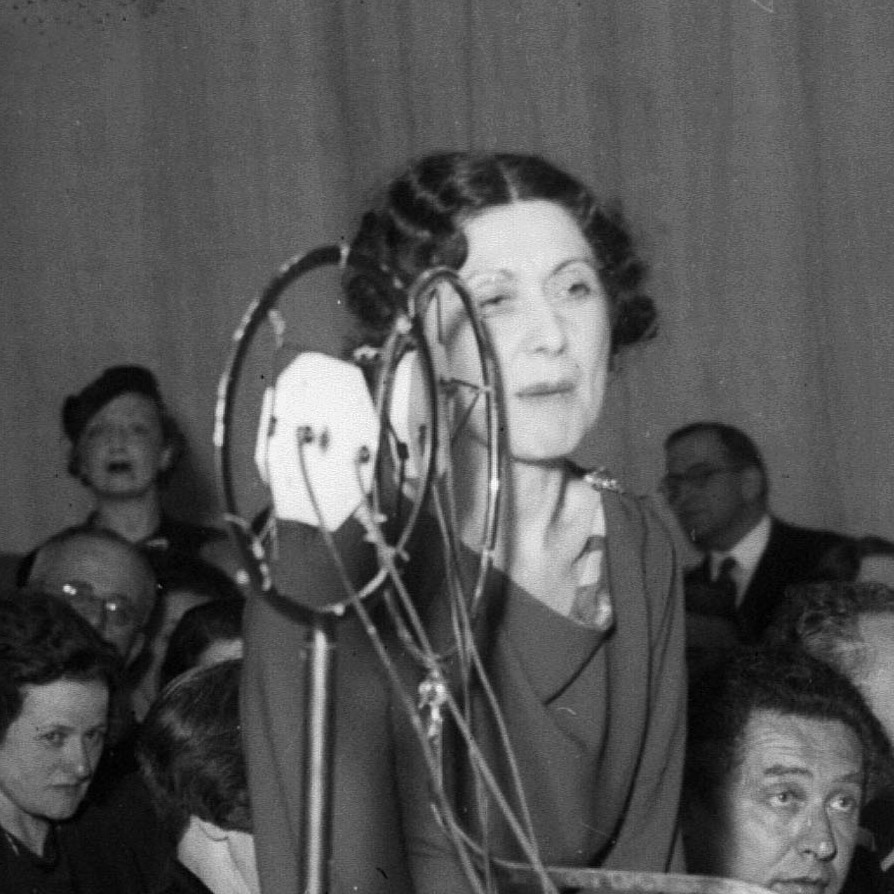
- Sieff in 1934
- Born: Rebecca Dora Marks; 23 February 1890; Leeds, UKGBI
- Died: 8 January 1966 (aged 75); Tel Aviv Sourasky Medical Center, Tel Aviv, Israel
- Education: Manchester University
- Spouse: Israel Sieff, Baron Sieff (m. 1910)
- Children: 4, including Marcus Sieff, Baron Sieff
- Father: Michael Marks
- Relatives: Simon Marks, Baron Marks (brother)

Rebecca Dora Sieff OBE (née Marks; Hebrew: רבקה סיף; 23 February 1890 – 8 January 1966) was a British Zionist and feminist. Sieff was a founding member and director of the Women's International Zionist Organization.

== Early life and education ==
Sieff was born on 23 February 1890 in Leeds to Michael Marks, a retailer and later co-founder of Marks & Spencer, and Hannah Marks (née Cohen). Her father was born to a Polish–Jewish family in Slonim, Grodno Governorate (present-day Belarus) and her mother was from a Russian-Jewish family. The second of five siblings, Sieff was the younger sister of the Simon Marks (later Baron Marks).

In 1894, the family settled in Manchester where her father founded Marks & Spencer. Educated at the Manchester High School for Girls, and in 1908 Sieff enrolled at Manchester University in order to study English literature. Whilst at University, Sieff met her future husband Israel Sieff (later Baron Sieff) and befriended Chaim Weizmann.

== Career ==
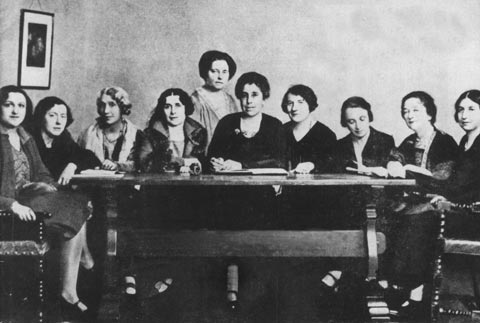
WIZO 1920 British delegation. Left to right: Miriam Marks, Miriam Sacher, Edith Eder, Rebecca Sieff, Helena Weisberg, Lady Samuel, Romana Goodman, Esther Feiwel, Henrietta Irwell and Ethel Solomon

During the First World War, Sieff was active in charitable organizations that collected donations for the Jewish population of Poland (Charity Fund for Polish Jewry). In 1918 she was elected to the Council of the English Zionist Federation, being one of only three women elected to that body directly, and not as representatives of subordinate groups. In the same year she took part in founding the Federation of Women Zionists (FWZ).

She and her husband both separately visited Palestine in preparation fulfilling the Balfour Declaration. Sieff was there with Vera Weizmann and Edith Eder and they were surprised by the poor living conditions and she decided that they needed a women's organisation and a college of domestic economy in Jerusalem. Weizman was a doctor and she believed that the women were working too equally as they did not have the strength of men. Sieff had been brought up to expect men to take the lead but she believed that women could better support the family by improving their traditional roles.

She was involved in the formation of the Women's International Zionist Organization (WIZO), In 1919 she and Vera Weizmann, Olga Alman, and Romana Goodman persuaded the English Zionist Federation that a separate organisation for women was required. Sieff was the first President of the new organisation.

In 1921, she was in Carlsbad as a part of the British delegation to the WIZO conference.

In 1949, the Women's International Zionist Organization moved its location to Israel and Sieff became its new president.

In 1956, her home was bombed and her gardener was killed.

== Personal life ==
In 1910, Sieff married Israel Sieff in Manchester. The couple had four children including Marcus Sieff, Baron Sieff, a retailer and Zionist.

In 1934, the Sieff family endowed the establishment of the Daniel Sieff Research Institute in memory of their Daniel (1915–1932), who intended to be a scientist. The institute was renamed the Weizmann Institute of Science in 1949 with the Sieff family's consent.

On 8 January 1966, Sieff died at the Tel Aviv Sourasky Medical Center aged 75.
