= Société Financière Française et Coloniale =

Société financière française et coloniale
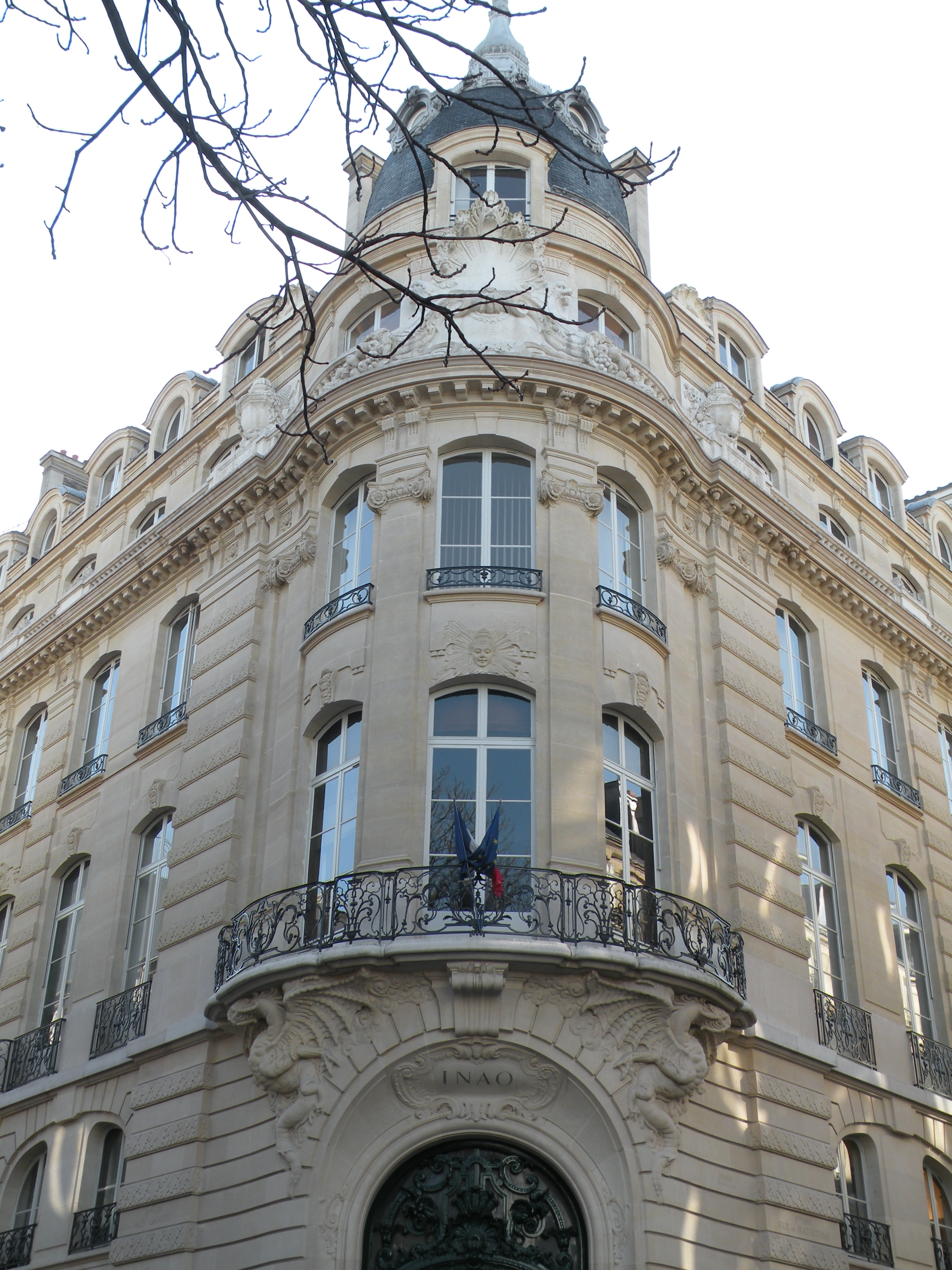
- SFFC head office building at 51, rue d'Anjou in Paris
- Company type: Investment bank
- Industry: Financial services
- Founded: December 11, 1920
- Founder: Octave Homberg
- Defunct: 1949
- Fate: Merged
- Successor: Suez Industrie
- Headquarters: Paris, France
- Products: Investments in colonial ventures

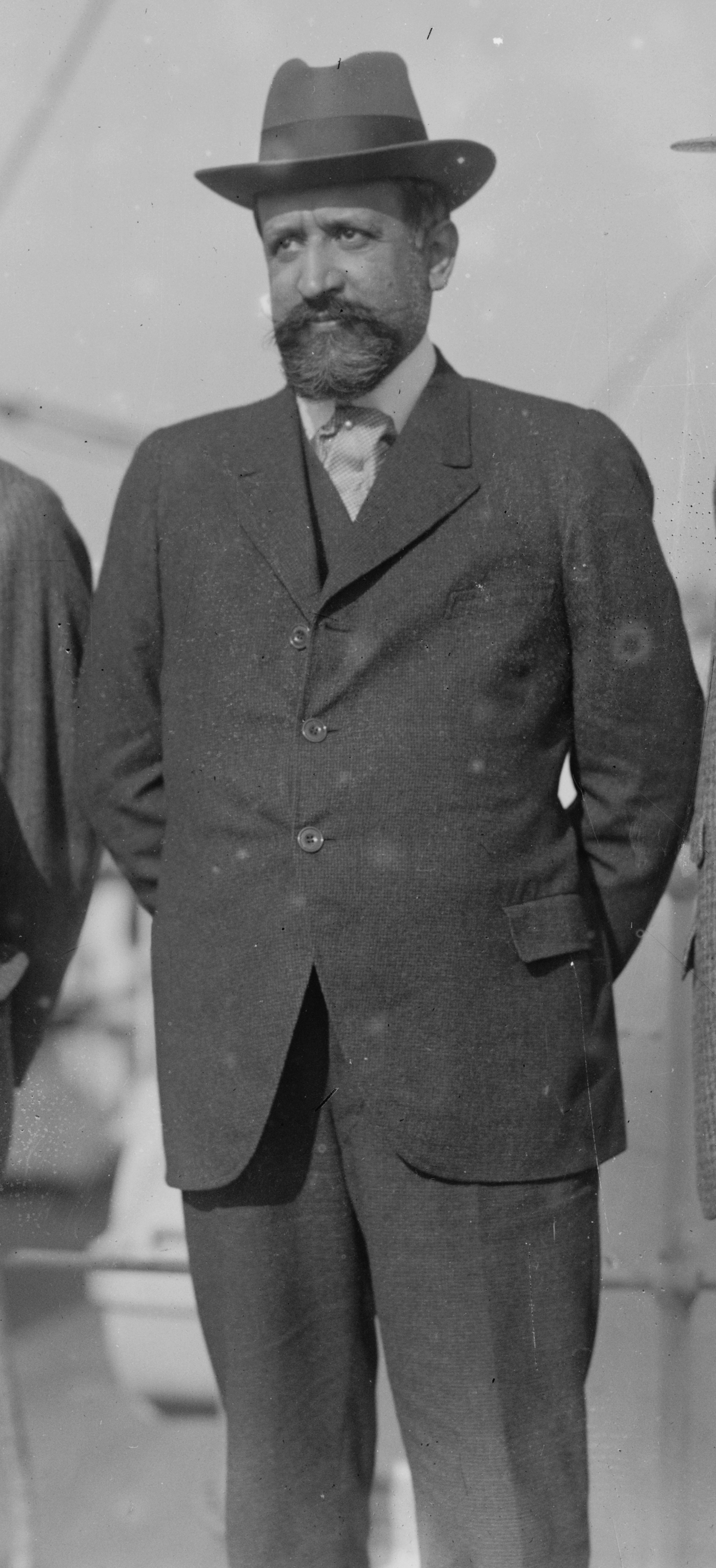
Octave Homberg created the SFFC and developed it aggressively throughout the 1920s

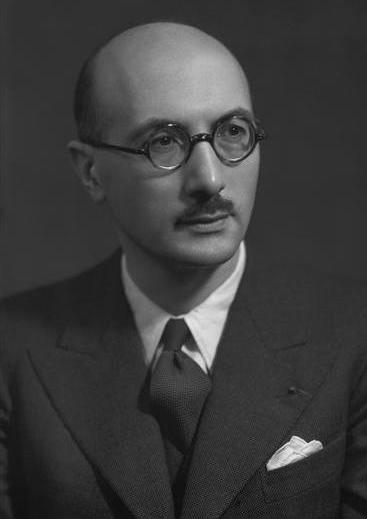
Edmond Giscard d'Estaing was the main artisan of the SFFC's restructuring in the 1930s

The Société financière française et coloniale (French pronunciation: [sɔsjete finɑ̃sjɛʁ fʁɑ̃sɛːz e kɔlɔnjal]; "French and Colonial Financial Company"; abbr. SFFC) was a French investment bank that was an active investor in colonial ventures, particularly in the 1920s. It was founded in 1920 by financier Octave Homberg, who led it until having to leave in stages in 1930-1931 following heavy losses. In 1949, the SFFC changed its name to Société financière pour la France et les pays d'Outre-Mer (SOFFO, "Financial Company for France and Overseas Lands"), which eventually merged into investment company Suez Industrie in 1998.

== History ==
Octave Homberg, a diplomat until 1905 and then a banker and financier who worked on the financing of France's war spending during World War I, created the SFFC on 12 November 1920. The new company was designed to channel investments in colonial ventures, primarily though not exclusively in French Indochina, which the Banque de l'Indochine was too cautious to undertake on its own. It was strongly supported by Lazard until a dispute in 1926. The company was initially domiciled at 35, boulevard Haussmann in Paris, and was later registered at the Banque de l'Indochine's head office at 96 bis, boulevard Haussmann. In 1927 it moved into a purpose-built head office of its own. Throughout the 1920s, it raised its capital on repeated occasions and invested in numerous companies, both in Metropolitan France and in Indochina, as well as in the New Hebrides, Djibouti, and Gabon. In France, the SFFC's investments included, among others, the Société pour l’exploitation des appareils Rateau, the Société franco-belge de matériel de chemin de fer, the Soieries Ducharne, the Cote Desfossés, the Compagnie centrale d'énergie électrique; in Indochina, the Société des Caoutchoucs de l'Indochine, the Crédit Foncier de l'Indochine, the Société industrielle de chimie d'Extrême-Orient, the Société des Sucreries et Raffineries de I’Indochine, and the Papeteries de l'Indochine; and elsewhere, the Société des Salines de Djibouti, Société algérienne d'éclairage et de force, the Société industrielle du Bas-Ogooué in Gabon, and the Société des minerais de la Grande-Île in Madagascar.

The SFFC's fortunes were negatively impacted by the economic downturn in 1929 and especially by turmoil in the rubber market, which led to a severe decline in the SFFC's stock price in late 1930, an incipient bank run, and eventually a comprehensive though protracted restructuring. In December 1930, the French government sponsored a financial package of 105 million francs, with credit provided by the Banque de l'Indochine (35 million), Lazard (20 million), the Banque de l'Union Parisienne (20 million), and Worms & Cie (5 million) together with the government itself (25 million), with an additional credit package provided by the same four banks in June 1931. Octave Homberg resigned his SFFC-related mandates in December 1930 and January 1931, and was replaced by Camille Barrère as SFFC chairman. The government of French Indochina contributed further financial support in June 1932. Eventually, in May 1933, the Banque de l'Indochine provided fresh equity and wrote off some of its prior lending to the SFFC. By mid-1935, the SFFC, which was no longer a bank but only an investment holding company, had sold many of its former assets and was again on a sound footing. Edmond Giscard d'Estaing succeeded Barrère as SFFC chairman in 1935.

During World War II, the SFFC relocated its head office to Vichy from June 1940 to November 1944, when it moved back to Paris. It changed its name to SOFFO on 20 July 1949, reflecting Giscard d'Estaing's pivot away from the French colonial empire to greater investment diversification including towards air travel and real estate. By 1967, more than half of the SOFFO's revenue came from Metropolitan France. It remained present in southeast Asia, however, principally through a majority stake in the Société Internationale de Plantation d'Hévéas.

In 1972, the Suez Company acquired a controlling stake in the SOFFO, which was still publicly traded. Edmond Giscard d'Estaing left its chairmanship in May 1974, succeeded by Jacques Polton until 1993, then by Patrick Ponsolle. By 1994, Suez held a 29 percent stake in SOFFO. In 1998, SOFFO merged with Suez Industrie, another holding entity within the Suez group.

== Buildings ==
=== Paris ===
During its brief heyday in the 1920s, the SFFC commissioned two iconic buildings in Paris, both bordering the Square Louis-XVI across Boulevard Haussmann from the head office of the Banque de l'Indochine. The first building at 51, rue d'Anjou, designed by architect Paul Fabre and completed in 1927, combines post-Haussmannian architectural codes with decorative details inspired by Southeast Asian art and especially Khmer sculpture, such as a seven-headed Nāga, Buddha's heads, and Khmer-style demons supporting balconies. The SFFC sold it during the 1930s restructuring to one of its invested companies, the Société des Salines de Djibouti, de Sfax et de Madagascar, a salt producer which made it its own head office and in 1967 became the Compagnie des Salins du Midi as its activity in Djibouti was discontinued. In 1996, the Salins du Midi relocated to Montpellier. The building became the seat of the Institut national de l'origine et de la qualité, a public intellectual-property agency, and more recently of Maurel & Prom, an oil exploration services company.

The second SFFC building at 34, rue Pasquier, was completed in 1929 on a design by architect Alex Fournier and his son Pierre in art deco style, and includes monumental bas-relief sculptures by Georges Saupique. It was sold by the SFFC, at a loss, as soon as 1933. After having hosted the Lonsdale clothing brand in the 2010s, it has been the head office of luxury brand Lancel since February 2022.

Ironically, the SFFC was a prominent exponent at the Paris Colonial Exposition in 1931, just at the time of its near-bankruptcy and financial restructuring, with a pavilion designed by architect Albert James Furiet with sculpture by Georges Saupique. The pavilion was demolished after the end of the exhibition.

By early 1940, the SFFC's head office was at 23, rue Nitot in Paris. The street was renamed rue de l'Amiral-d'Estaing in 1949, following lobbying by Edmond Giscard d'Estaing.

=== Saigon ===
The SFFC first opened an agency in Saigon in 1923, and in 1926 moved it to a building erected for that purpose on Boulevard de la Somme, now Hàm Nghi in Ho Chi Minh City. In 1933, the SFFC sold it to the Union immobilière indochinoise (UII), a company in which it was an investor; the UII in turn sold it to the Franco-Chinese Bank, which made it its principal building in Saigon and remodeled it in the late 1930s. Following the Fall of Saigon, the building was used until 2015 by the Mekong Housing Bank, and more recently by the Bank for Investment and Development of Vietnam (BIDV).

=== Other locations ===
The Haiphong branch of the SFFC was designed by architects Georges-Henri Pingusson and Paul Furiet, and completed in 1928 on Boulevard Bonnal, now Công viên Tố Hữu. The SFFC sold it to one of its creditors in 1936. The building still exists and is used as a branch by Vietinbank.

The SFFC inaugurated a branch building in Hanoi in 1928, but closed it after only a few years of operation.

By the early 1930s the SFFC also had offices in Phnom Penh and Casablanca.

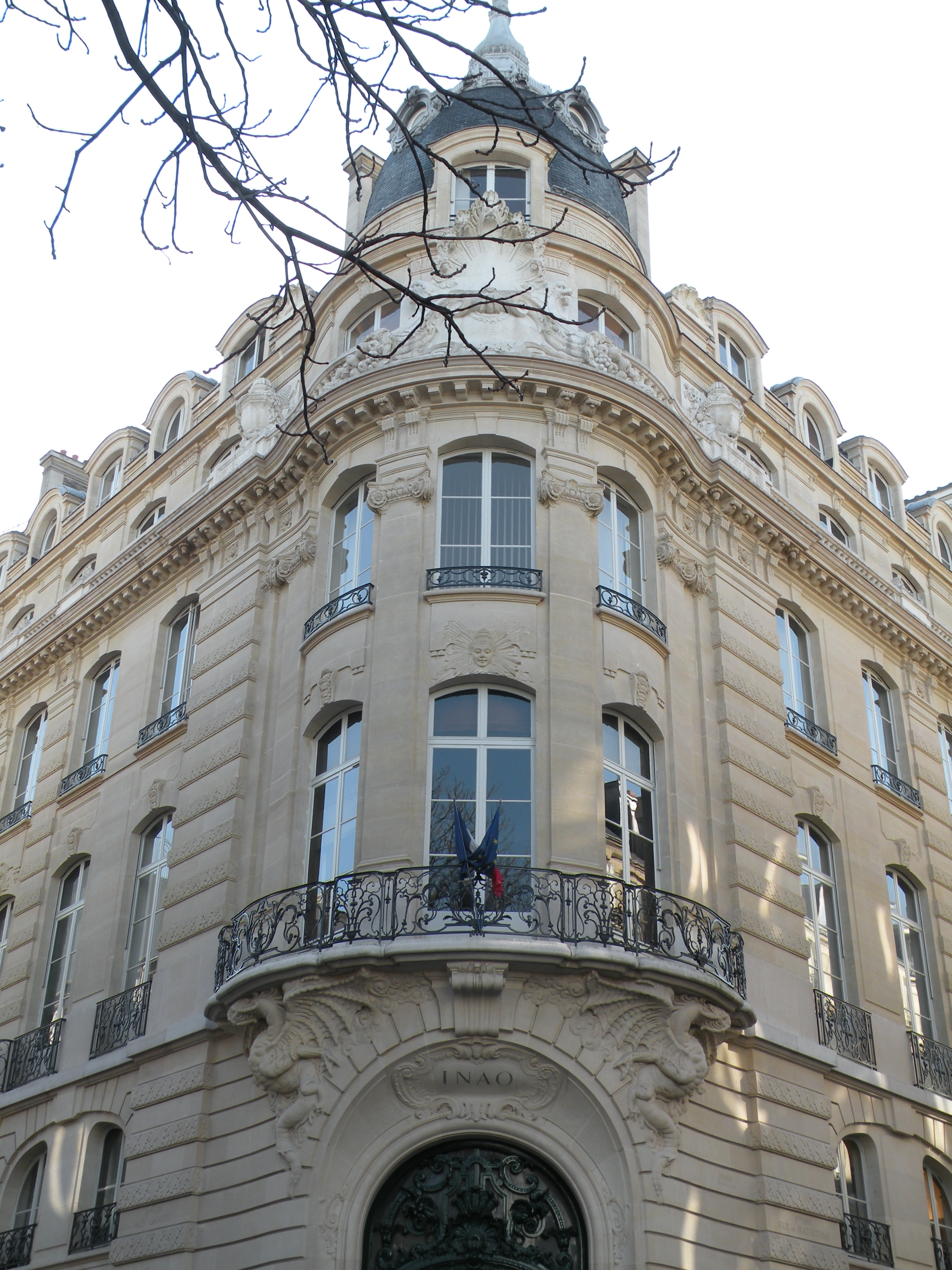
SFFC head office building at 51, rue d'Anjou in Paris

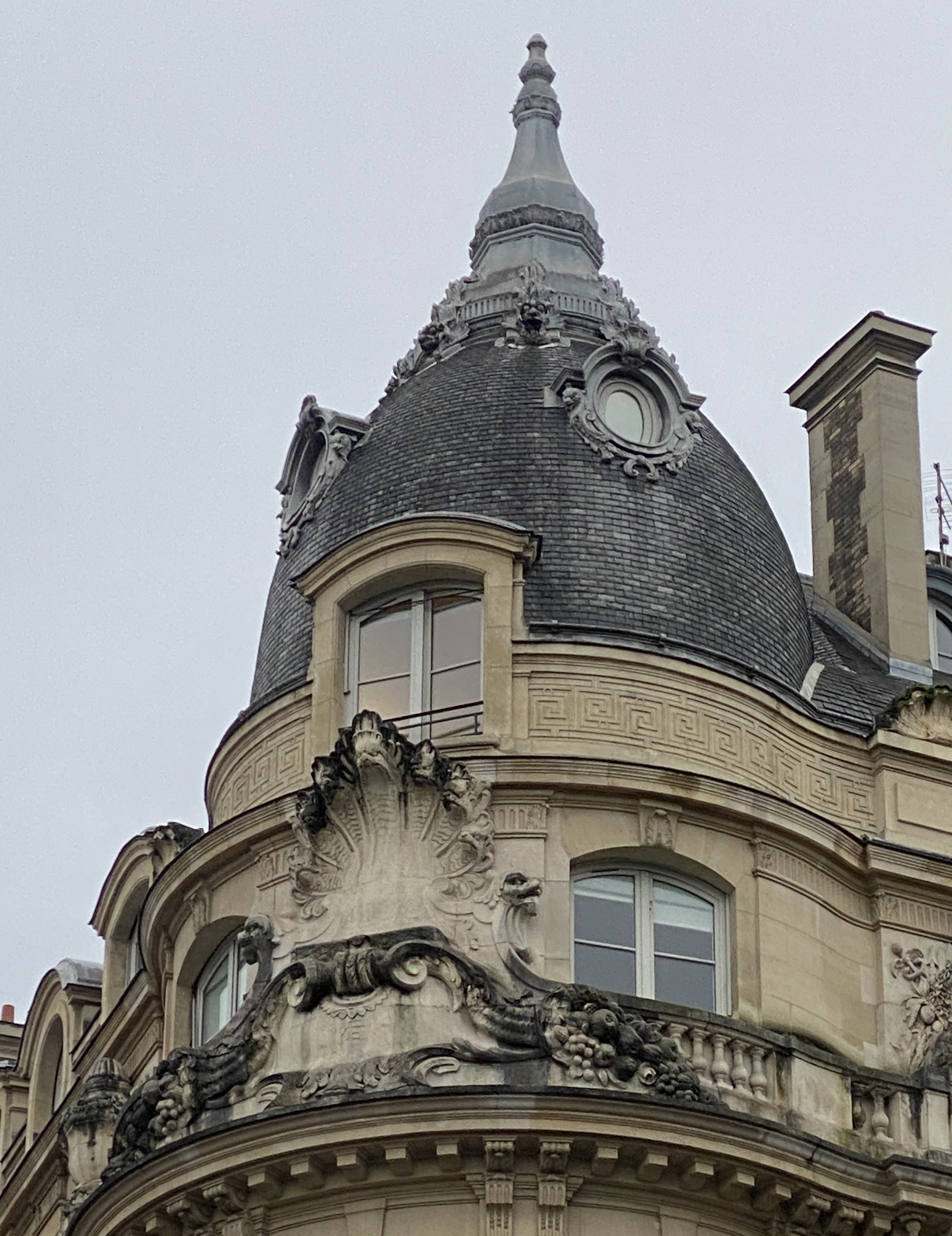
51, rue d'Anjou: sculpted Nāga

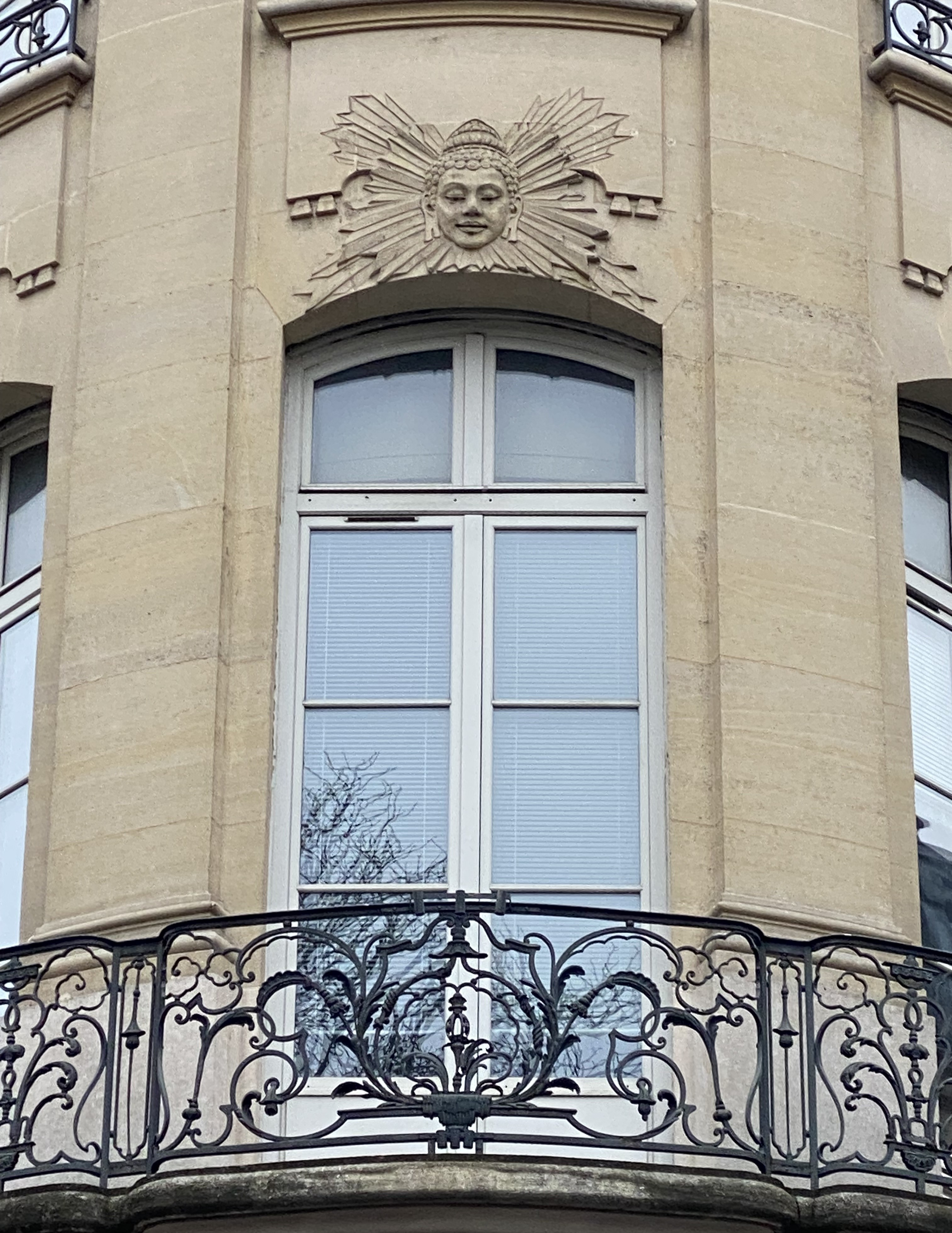
51, rue d'Anjou: sculpted head of Buddha

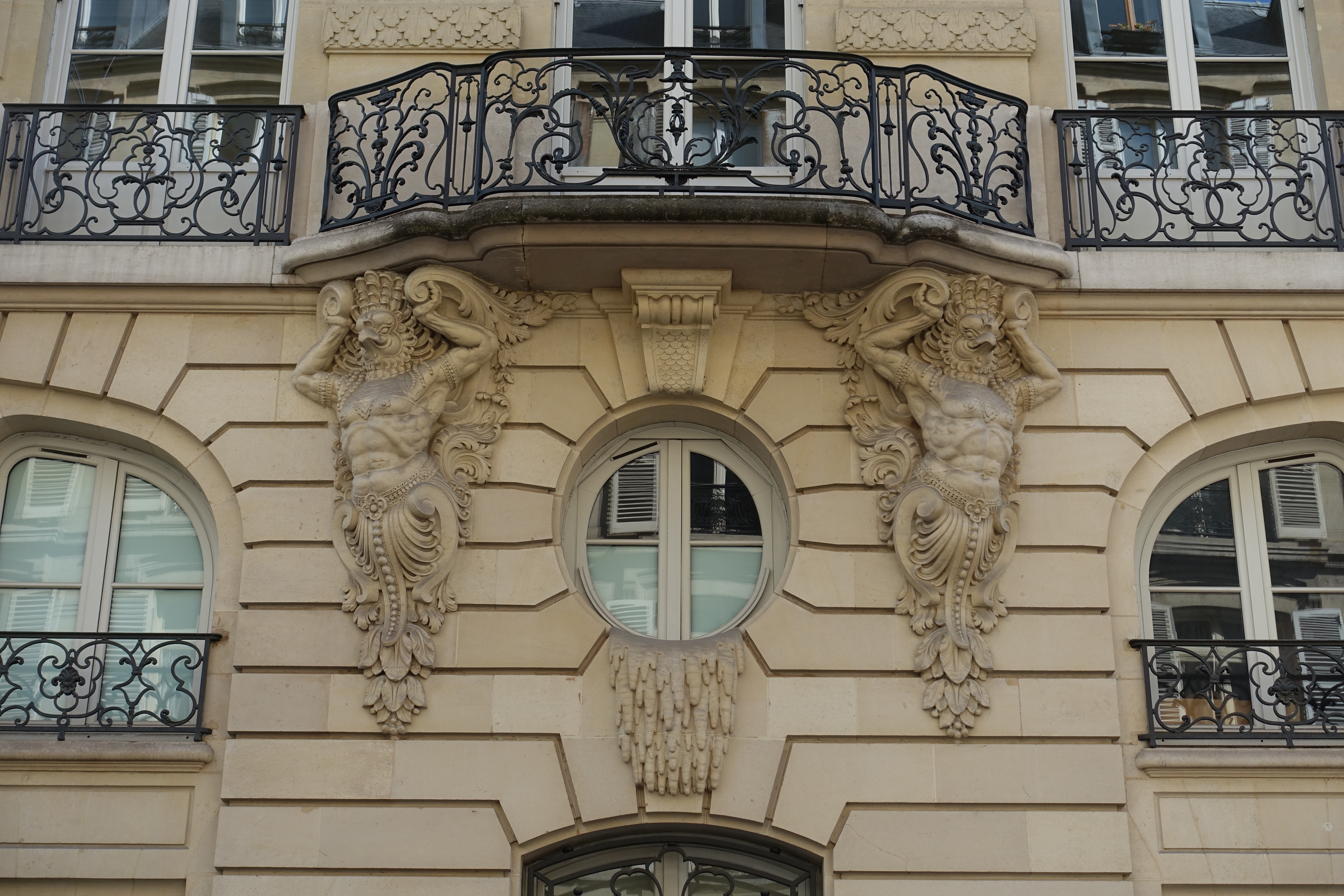
51, rue d'Anjou: Asian-inspired balcony

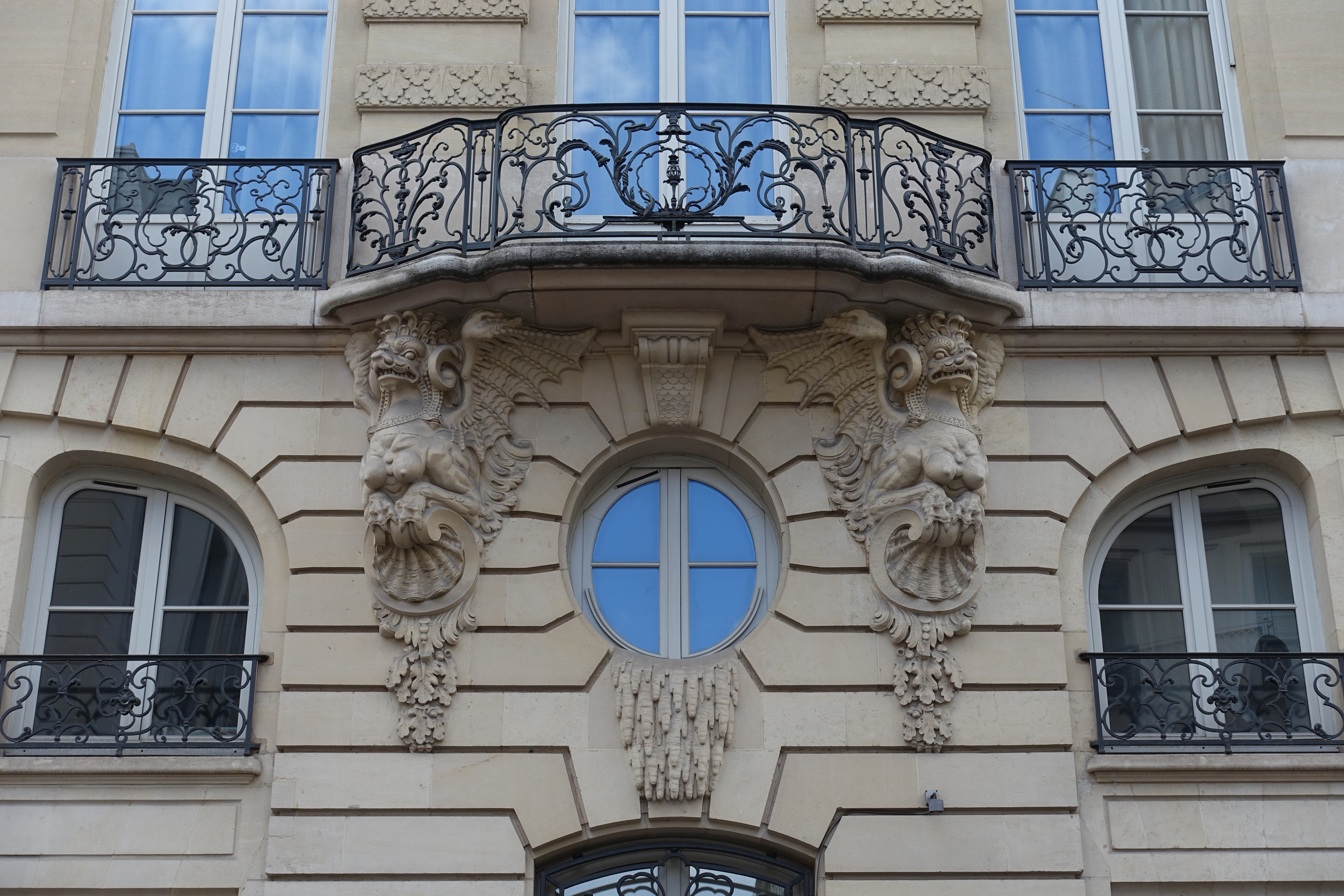
51, rue d'Anjou: Asian-inspired balcony

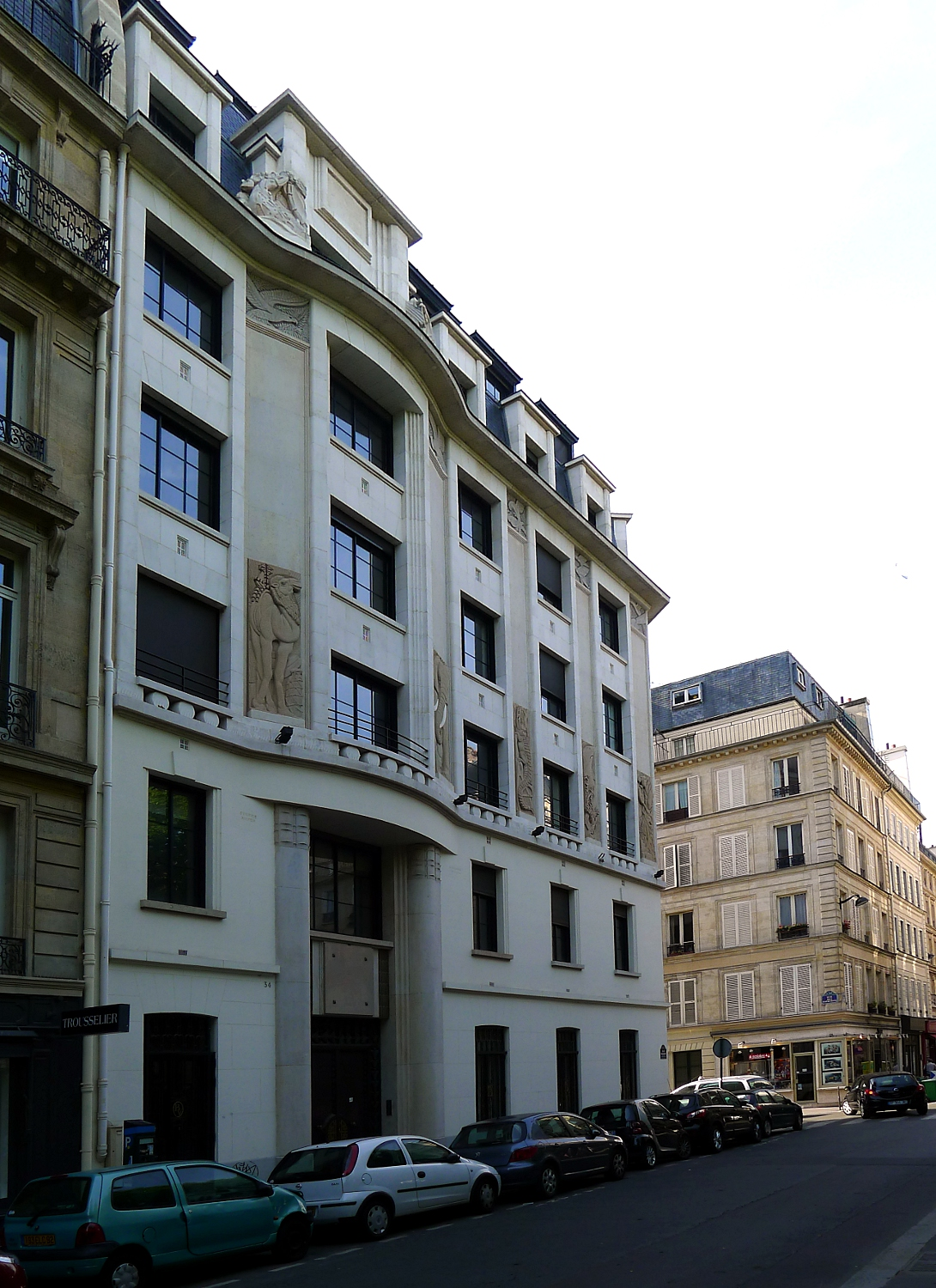
SFFC building at 34, rue Pasquier, with the bas-relief sculptures by Georges Saupique

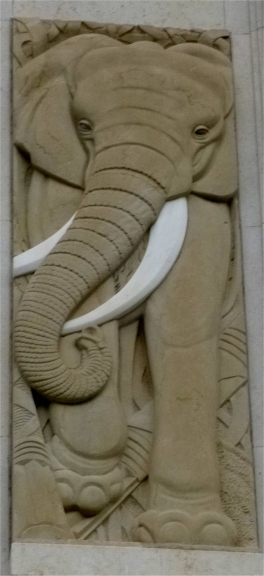
34, rue Pasquier: Elephant by Saupique

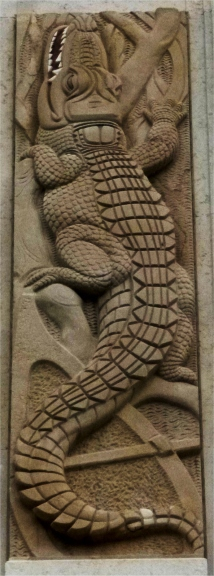
34, rue Pasquier: Crocodile by Saupique

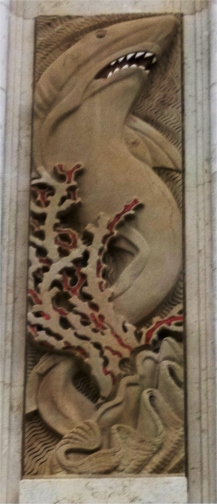
34, rue Pasquier: Shark by Saupique

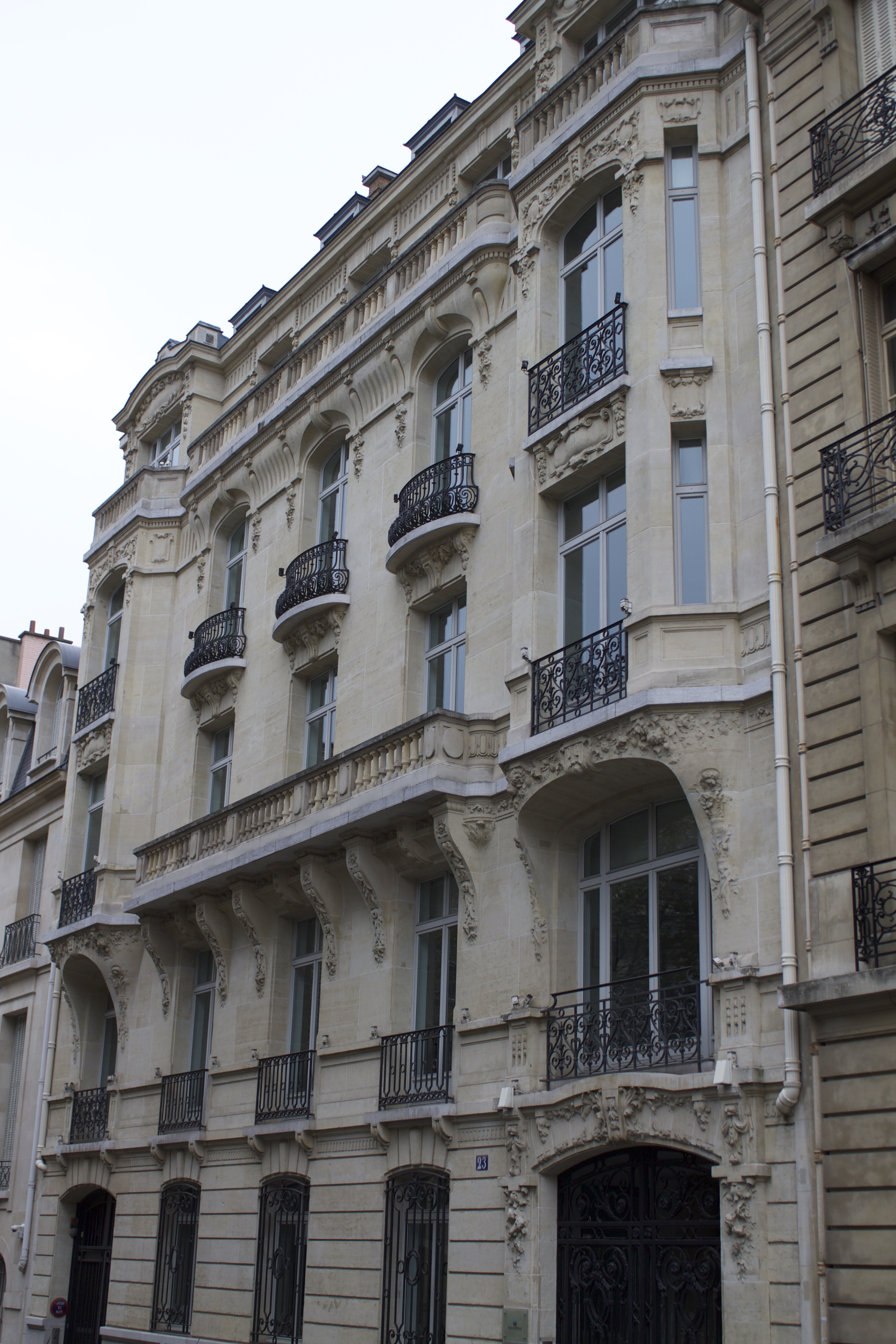
23, rue de l'Amiral-d'Estaing (formerly rue Nitot) in Paris, the postwar Parisian head office of SFFC then SOFFO

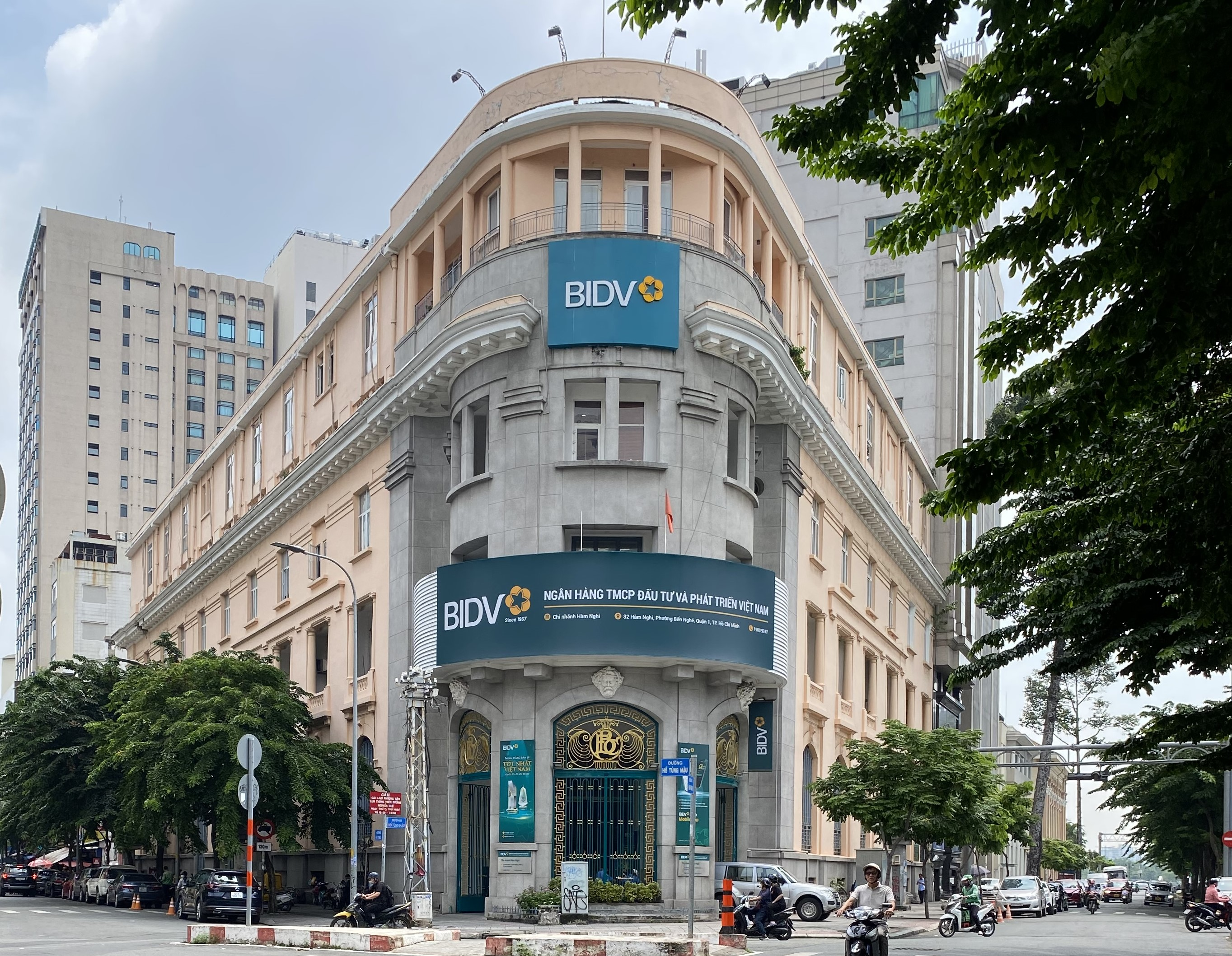
Former SFFC building in Saigon, later remodeled by the Franco-Chinese Bank

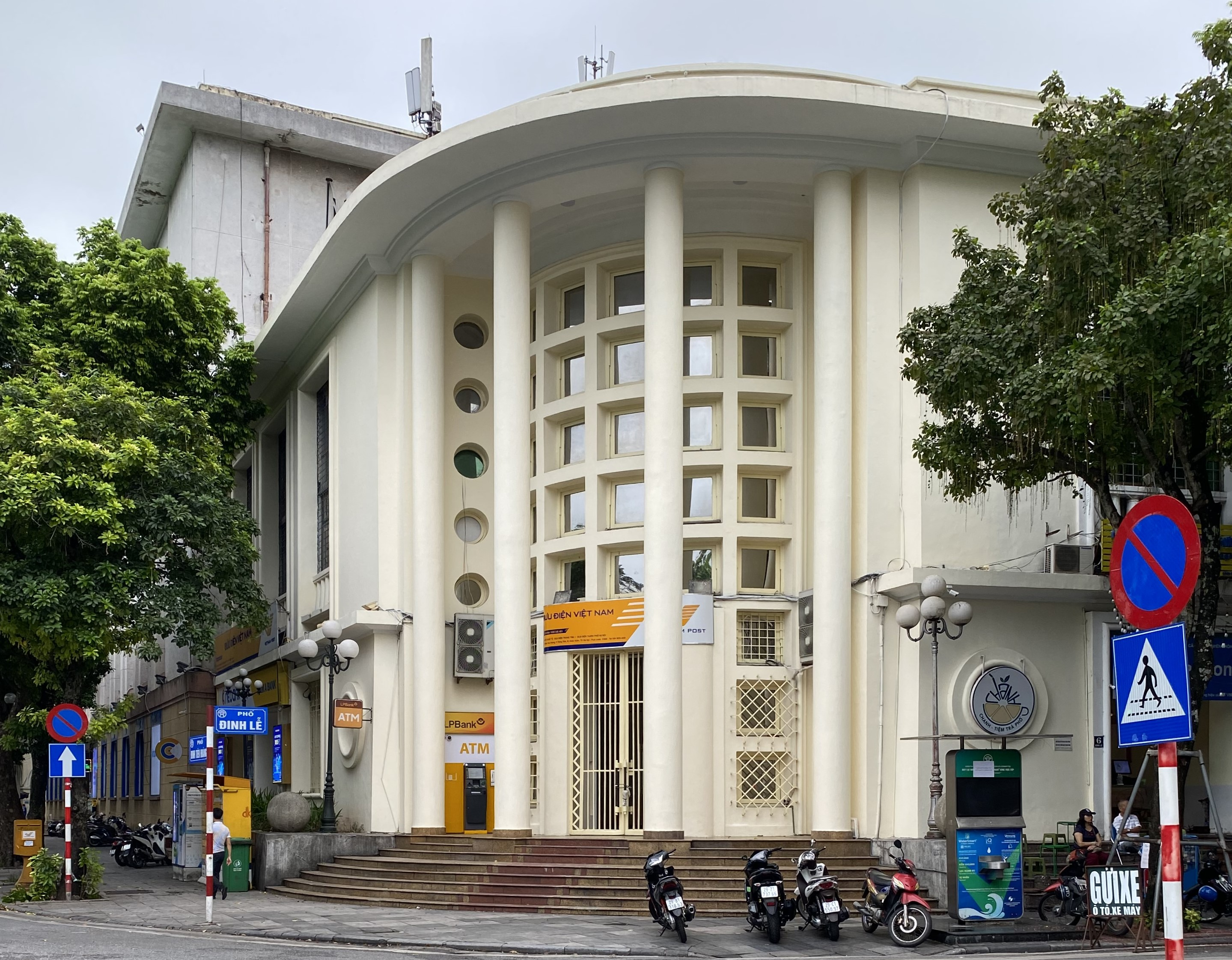
Former SFFC building in Hanoi

== See also ==
- Banque de l'Indochine
- List of banks in France
