= Octave Homberg =

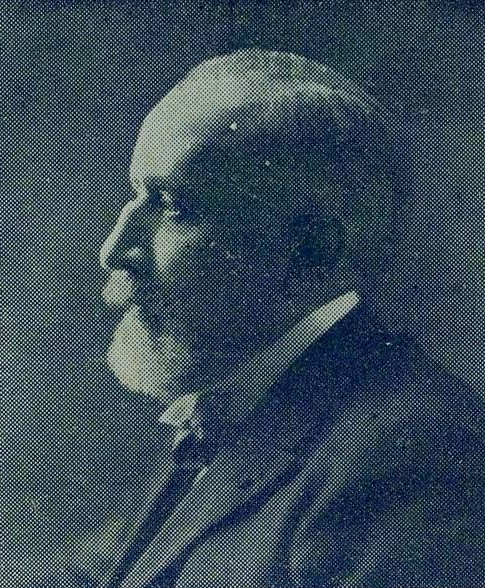

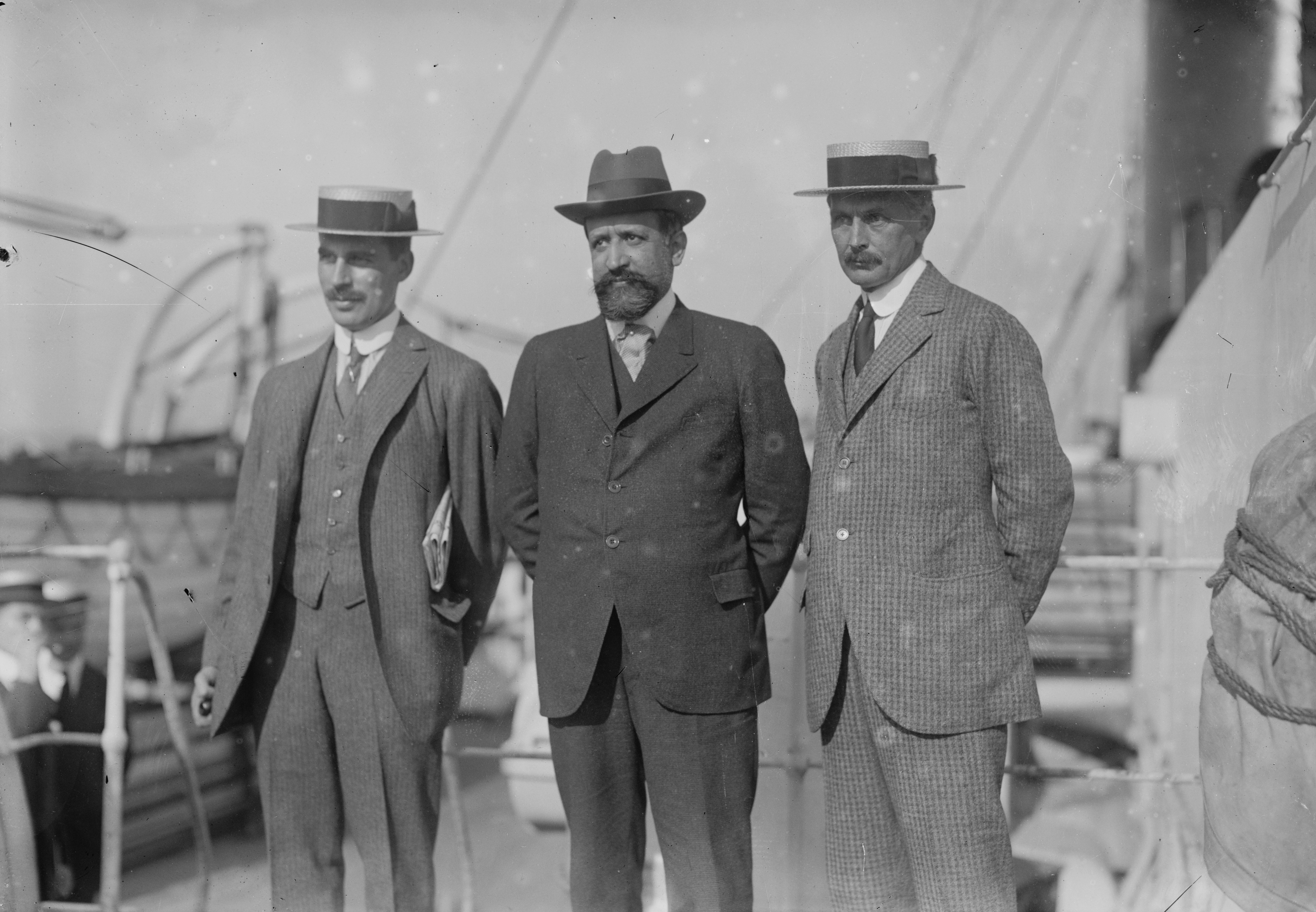
Basil Phillott Blackett, Octave Homberg and Ernest Mallet arriving in New York City to appeal for financial aid in 1915.

Octave Marie Joseph Kérim Homberg, Jr. (19 January 1876 – 9 July 1941) was a French diplomat, author, and financier. He was director of the Indo-China Bank.

== Biography ==
He was born on 19 January 1876 in Paris, France to Octave Homberg, Sr. (1844-1907). During World War I he appealed to the United States for loans and participated in the 1915 Anglo-French Financial Commission. He headed the Commission of Bankers and Economists in France in 1917.

In 1920 he founded the Société financière française et coloniale, which he led until early 1931.

He died on 9 July 1941 in Cannes, France.
