= Marcus Sieff, Baron Sieff of Brimpton =

British businessman

The Right Honourable The Lord Sieff of Brimpton OBE

Member of the House of Lords
- Lord Temporal
- Life peerage 14 February 1980 – 23 February 2001

Personal details
- Born: 2 July 1913
- Died: 23 February 2001 (aged 87)

Marcus Joseph Sieff, Baron Sieff of Brimpton OBE (Hebrew: מרקוס זיו; 2 July 1913 – 23 February 2001) was a British businessman and chairman of his family company, the retailer Marks & Spencer, from 1972 to 1982. Like his parents, he was also a leading figure in UK Zionism.

== Life ==
Sieff was born in Didsbury, Manchester, the second son of Rebecca Sieff and Israel Sieff. He was educated at Manchester Grammar School, St Paul's and Corpus Christi College, Cambridge. Starting work for the family company in Hammersmith, London in 1935, Sieff first visited Mandatory Palestine in 1939. He joined the Royal Artillery in the British Army at the outbreak of World War II and received an OBE in 1944 for gallant service. Exiting the British Army with the rank of colonel, he returned to Marks & Spencer, but was asked in 1948 by the first Prime Minister of Israel, David Ben-Gurion, to become an adviser on transportation and supplies to the Israeli Defence ministry. Sieff joined the Israel Defense Forces and helped co-ordinate Marks & Spencer goods and finances to support the new state.

Sieff was knighted in 1971 and was created a life peer on 14 February 1980 as Baron Sieff of Brimpton, of Brimpton in the Royal County of Berkshire. Married four times, Sieff's fourth wife was a Polish widow, Lily Moretzki (née Spatz), whom he married in London in 1963. She ran most of his charitable associations and then nursed him during his final years. One of his sons Sir David Sieff served on the board of Marks & Spencers for many years.

== Arms ==
Coat of arms of Marcus Sieff, Baron Sieff of Brimpton

Crest
A Demi-Lion as in the Arms holding a Caduceus Or
Escutcheon
Sable a Lion rampant Argent crowned with an Eastern Crown and holding between the forepaws two Triangles interlaced and eradiated Or on a Chief Argent a Lyre Azure between two Pairs of Paintbrushes in saltire proper
Supporters
Dexter: a Lion holding aloft two interlaced Triangles Or depressing a Cornucopia replenished proper and gorged with a Plain Collar Sable tied about with a Fishing Line knotted in front pendant therefrom a Grey Wulf Trout Fly proper; Sinister: an Owl proper gorged with a like Collar tied about with a fishing line knotted in front pendant therefrom a Red Wulf Trout Fly proper
Motto
SENZA SAPIENZA NIENTE CAPIRE (Without knowledge there is no understanding)
