= Israel Sieff, Baron Sieff =

English businessman and Zionist

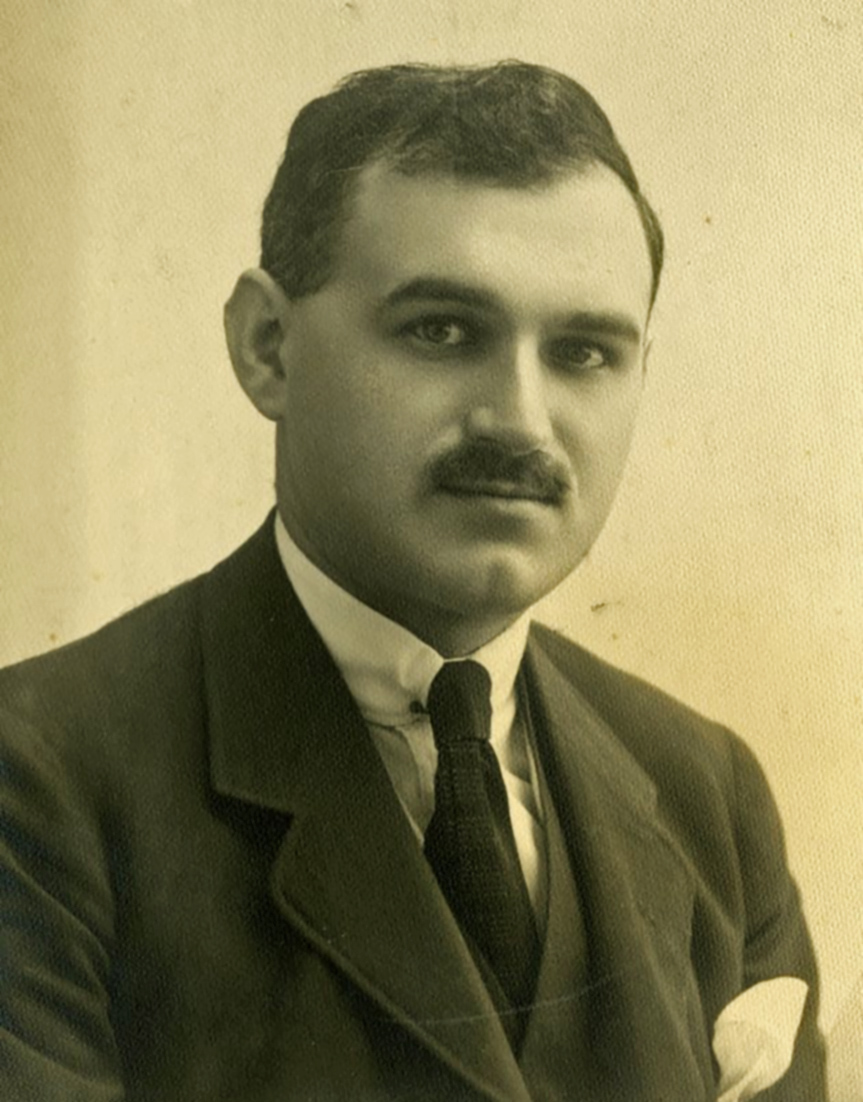
Israel Sieff, 1st Baron Sieff

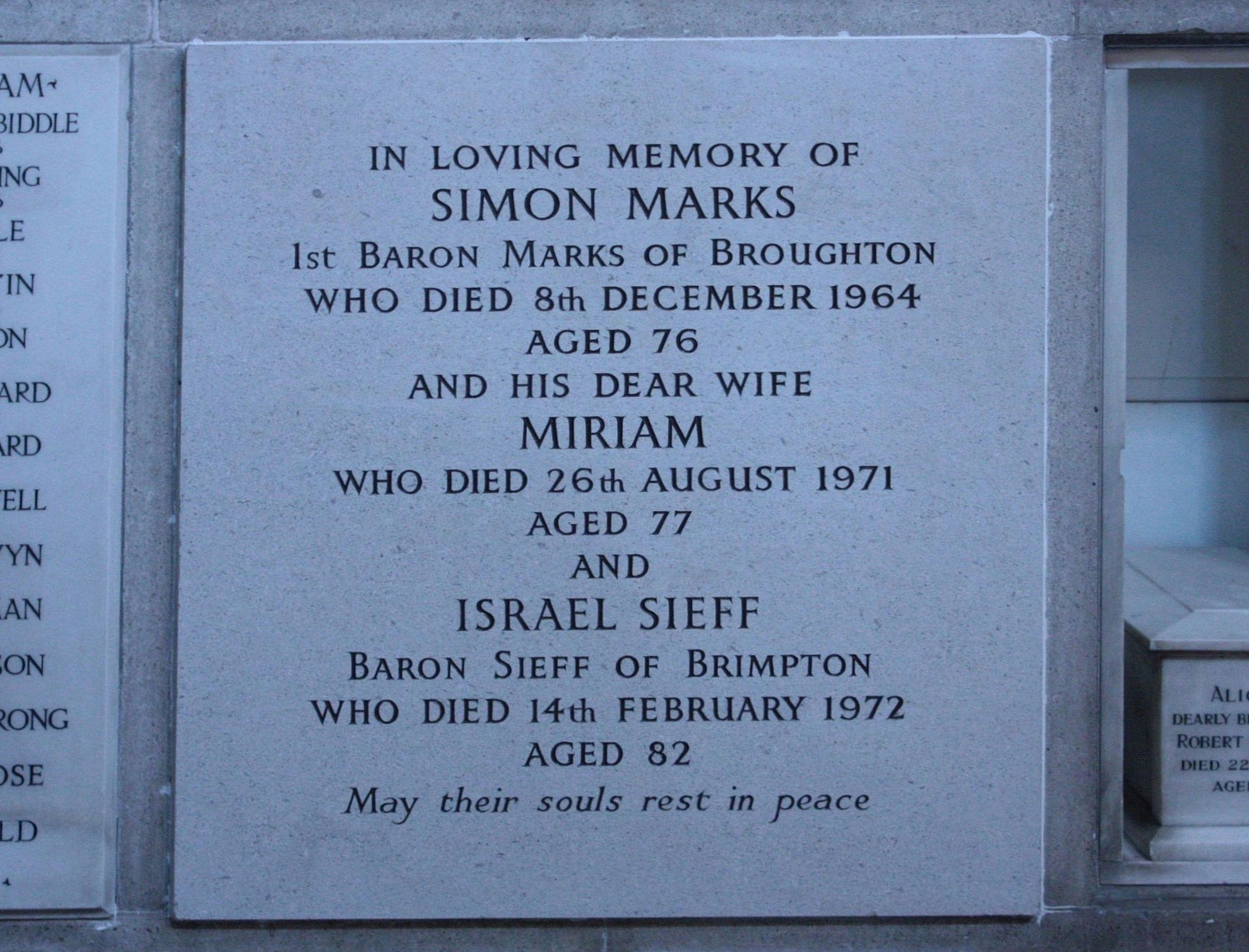
The ashes of Israel Sieff placed with Simon Marks, Golders Green Crematorium

Israel Moses Sieff, Baron Sieff (4 May 1889 – 14 February 1972) was an English businessman and Zionist who was chairman of the British retailer Marks & Spencer from 1964 to 1967.

== Early life and education ==
He was born in Manchester, the son of Ephraim Sieff and Sarah Saffer. His father, a Jewish immigrant from Lithuania, founded a prosperous textile business in Manchester. He was educated at Manchester Grammar School alongside Simon Marks, son of Marks & Spencer co-founder Michael Marks. For 63 years, he and Marks shared a close friendship that was cemented when each married the other's sister. He earned a degree in commerce at the University of Manchester.

Sieff joined Simon Marks in Marks & Spencer in 1915 while also maintaining an interest in the Sieff family business. In 1926, when Marks & Spencer became a public company, Sieff joined Simon Marks full-time as vice-chairman and joint managing director. In the early 1930s, Sieff went to the United States and spent several weeks in the merchandise development of Sears to gain practical knowledge to improve the company.

When Simon Marks died in December 1964, Sieff became the chairman and joint managing director of the company. On 18 January 1966, he was created a life peer as Baron Sieff, of Brimpton in the Royal County of Berks.

Following Lord Sieff's death, The Times recalled Sieff's approach to business:

It was a remarkable combination of two very different minds and personalities which produced the amazing success of Marks and Spencer. The immense practical genius of Lord Marks balanced the percipient, sensitive fascination with any piece of pioneering which was characteristic of Sieff. He was from the beginning deeply interested in all the social and economic implications of commerce on the scale with which he now found himself involved, and introduced many novelties in the relations of the firm with their customers, their employees, and their suppliers.

— The Times, 1972

In 1918, Sieff was a member of the Zionist Commission which visited Palestine under the leadership of Chaim Weizmann.

Sieff was president of the Political and Economic Planning think-tank from its foundation in 1931 and its chairman until 1939.

== Marriage and family ==
In 1910, he married Rebecca Marks OBE. His wife was the President of WIZO for most of her life. They had three sons and a daughter:

- Hon. Michael David Sieff CBE (1911–1987)
- Marcus Sieff, Baron Sieff of Brimpton (1913–2001)
- Daniel Sieff (1915–1932)
- Judith Hannah Sieff (1921–1999)

The death of their son Daniel, who intended to be a scientist, at age 17 led Sieff — and with the financial support of his business partners and relatives by marriage, the Marks and Sacher families — to endow the 1934 creation, by Chaim Weizmann, of the Daniel Sieff Research Institute in Rehovot in present-day Israel. Renamed the Weizmann Institute of Science in 1949 with the Sieff family's consent, it is Israel's premier research university in the natural sciences.

Sieff was cremated at Golders Green Crematorium and his ashes were placed next to those of Simon Marks.

== Arms ==
Coat of arms of Israel Sieff, Baron Sieff

Crest
A Demi-Lion as in the Arms holding a Caduceus Or
Escutcheon
Sable a Lion rampant Argent crowned with an Eastern Crown and holding between the forepaws two Triangles interlaced and eradiated Or on a Chief Argent a Lyre Azure between two Pairs of Paintbrushes in saltire proper
Supporters
Dexter: a Lion holding aloft two interlaced Triangles Or depressing a Cornucopia replenished proper and gorged with a Plain Collar Sable tied about with a Fishing Line knotted in front pendant therefrom a Grey Wulf Trout Fly proper; Sinister: an Owl proper gorged with a like Collar tied about with a fishing line knotted in front pendant therefrom a Red Wulf Trout Fly proper
Motto
SENZA SAPIENZA NIENTE CAPIRE (Without knowledge there is no understanding)
