= List of related life peers =

This is a list of people with peerages of the United Kingdom created under the Life Peerages Act 1958 and Lords of Appeal in Ordinary (whose life peerages are created under the Appellate Jurisdiction Act 1876) who are closely related to one another, either by blood up to the degree of third cousins, or by marriage or cohabitation. This list is ordered by the antiquity of the earliest title each family has.

== Those related by blood and marriage ==
=== The Barons Russell of Killowen, Romer and Maugham ===
The title Baron Russell of Killowen was created three times for father, son and grandson, all of them appointed to be Lords of Appeal in Ordinary. In 1900, the second baron married Mary Emily Ritchie, a daughter of the first (hereditary) Baron Ritchie of Dundee, of Welders, in the parish of Chalfont St. Giles, in the county of Buckingham (1905). The titles are

- Baron Russell of Killowen, in the county of Down (1894);
- Baron Russell of Killowen of Killowen in the County of Down (1929); and
- Baron Russell of Killowen, of Killowen in the County of Down (1975).

Frederick Maugham (1866–1958) and Mark Romer (1866–1944) were also high-ranking judges appointed to be Lords of Appeal in Ordinary, the former in 1935 and the latter in 1938. Maugham married Romer's sister, Helen Mary in 1896. He was later appointed Lord High Chancellor of Great Britain in 1938 and elevated to be Viscount Maugham, of Hartfield in the County of Sussex in 1939 on his retirement, as was customary. Romer married Anne Wilmot Ritchie, an elder daughter of the aforementioned first Baron Ritchie of Dundee. Their life peerages are

- Baron Maugham of Hartfield in the County of Sussex (1935); and
- Baron Romer of New Romney in the County of Kent (1938)

Family tree showing the relationships between The Barons Russell of Killowen, Romer and Viscount Maugham

Charles Arthur Russell; Baron Russell of Killowen (1832–1900)	Charles Thomson Ritchie; 1st Baron Ritchie of Dundee (1838–1906)	Sir Robert Romer; A Lord Justice of Appeal (1840–1918)
Francis Xavier Joseph Russell; Baron Russell of Killowen (1867–1946)	Hon. Mary Emily Ritchie (1870–1956)	Hon. Anne Wilmot Ritchie (1869–1948)	Mark Lemon Romer; Baron Romer (1866–1944)	Helen Mary Romer (1872–1950)	Frederic Herbert Maugham; 1st Viscount Maugham; Baron Maugham (1866–1958)
Charles Ritchie Russell; Baron Russell of Killowen (1908–1986)

=== Asquith/Bonham Carter ===
Aside from the hereditary Earldom of Oxford and Asquith, and Viscountcy Asquith, of Morley in the West Riding of the County of York, members of the Asquith, Bonham Carter and related families have been ennobled with the following life peerages:

- Baron Asquith of Bishopstone, of Bishopstone in the County of Sussex (1951, Law Lord);
- Baroness Elliot of Harwood, of Rulewater in the County of Roxburgh (1958, Conservative);
- Baroness Asquith of Yarnbury, of Yarnbury in the County of Wiltshire (1964, Liberal);
- Baron Grimond, of Firth in the County of Orkney (1983, Liberal);
- Baron Bonham-Carter, of Yarnbury in the County of Wiltshire (1986, Liberal Democrat);
- Baron Razzall, of Mortlake in the London Borough of Richmond (1997, Liberal Democrat); and
- Baroness Bonham-Carter of Yarnbury, of Yarnbury in the County of Wiltshire (2004, Liberal Democrat).

Lord Grimond and The Hon. Laura Bonham Carter married in 1938. Lord Razzall and The Baroness Bonham-Carter of Yarnbury became partners in 2008.

- Sir Charles Clow Tennant, 1st Baronet (1823–1906)
  - Emma Margaret Asquith, Countess of Oxford and Asquith née Tennant (1864–1945) = Herbert Henry Asquith, 1st Earl of Oxford and Asquith (1852–1928)
  - Katharine Elliot, Baroness Elliot of Harwood née Tennant (1903–1994)
- Herbert Henry Asquith, 1st Earl of Oxford and Asquith (1852–1928)
  - Raymond Herbert Asquith (1878–1916)
    - Edward Julian George Asquith, 2nd Earl of Oxford and Asquith (1916–2011)
      - Raymond Benedict Bartholomew Michael Asquith, 3rd Earl of Oxford and Asquith (b. 1952) Representative peer in the House of Lords from 2014, replacing Lord Methuen.
        - Mark Julian Asquith, Viscount Asquith (b. 1979)
  - Helen Violet Bonham Carter, Baroness Asquith of Yarnbury née Violet Asquith (1887–1969)
    - Laura Grimond, Lady Grimond née Bonham Carter (1918–1994) = Joseph Grimond, Baron Grimond (1913–1993)
    - Mark Raymond Bonham Carter, Baron Bonham-Carter(1922–1994)
      - Jane Mary Bonham Carter, Baroness Bonham-Carter of Yarnbury (b. 1957) ~ Edward Timothy Razzall, Baron Razzall (b. 1943)
  - Cyril Asquith, Baron Asquith of Bishopstone (1890–1954)

=== Cohen ===
Lionel Leonard Cohen was made a Law Lord in 1951. Janet Neel married James Lionel Cohen, Lionel's first cousin, in 1971. Janet was ennobled in 2000 after being Governor of the BBC. Their titles are

- Baron Cohen of Walmer in the County of Kent (1951, Law Lord) and
- Baroness Cohen of Pimlico, of Pimlico in the City of Westminster (2000, Labour)
- Lionel Louis Cohen (1832–1887)
  - Sir Leonard Lionel Cohen (1858–1938)
    - Lionel Leonard Cohen, Baron Cohen (1888–1973)
  - Frank Lionel Cohen (1865–1955)
    - Richard Henry Lionel Cohen (1907–1998)
      - James Lionel Cohen (b. 1942) = Janet Neel, Baroness Cohen of Pimlico (b. 1940)

=== Shackleton/Salmon ===
- Baron Shackleton, of Burley in the County of Southampton (1958, Labour)
- Baron Salmon, of Sandwich in the County of Kent (1972, Law Lord)
- Baron Lawson of Blaby, of Newnham in the County of Northamptonshire (1992, Conservative)
- Baroness Shackleton of Belgravia, of Belgravia in the City of Westminster (2010, Conservative)
- Baroness Monckton of Dallington Forest, of Earlsdown in the County of East Sussex (2024, Conservative)

^Nigel Lawson married Vanessa Salmon in 1955. They divorced in 1980. His son Hon. Dominic married Baroness Monckton of Dallington Forest in 1991. She is a daughter of the second Viscount Monckton of Brenchley.

Family tree showing the relationships between Lords Shackleton, Salmon, Lawson of Blaby, and The Baroness Shackleton of Belgravia

Ebenezer Shackleton (1784–1856)
Richard Ebenezer Shackleton (1836–1900)	Henry Shackleton (b. 1847)	Barnett Salmon (1829–1897)
Ebenezer Shackleton	The Explorer; Sir Ernest Henry Shackleton (1874–1922)	Alfred Salmon (1868–1928)	Montague Salmon (b. 1878)
Richard Ebenezer Shackleton (b. 1899)	Edward Arthur Alexander Shackleton; Baron Shackleton (1911–1994)	Barnett Alfred Salmon (1895–1965)	Felix Addison Salmon (1908–1969)	Cyril Barnet Salmon; Baron Salmon (1903–1991)
Lt.-Col. Richard John Shackleton (1926–1977)	Moira Elizabeth Frances Charkham née Salmon (b. 1932)	Vanessa Mary Addison Salmon (d. 1985)	Nigel Lawson^ Baron Lawson of Blaby (1932–2023)
Ian Ridgeway Shackleton	Fiona Sara Shackleton née Charkam; Baroness Shackleton of Belgravia (b. 1956)	Hon. Dominic Ralph Campden Lawson (b. 1956)	Rosamond Mary Monckton; Baroness Monckton of Dallington Forest (b. 1953)

=== Shawcross, Forte, Wolfson and Rawlings ===
The titles held by members of the Wolfson and Shawcross families, and their relations, are

- Baron Shawcross, of Friston in the County of Sussex (1959);
- Baron Forte, of Ripley in the county of Surrey (1982);
- Baron Wolfson, of Marylebone in the City of Westminster (1985);
- Baron Wolfson of Sunningdale, of Trevose in the County of Cornwall (1991);
- Baroness Rawlings, of Burnham Westgate in the County of Norfolk (1994);
- Baron Wolfson of Aspley Guise, of Aspley Guise in the County of Bedfordshire (2010); and
- Baroness Shawcross-Wolfson, of Aspley Guise in the County of Bedfordshire (2025).

Baron Wolfson of Sunningdale and The Baroness Rawlings were married in 1962. Their marriage was dissolved in 1967. Baron Wolfson of Aspley Guise is the child of Baron Wolfson of Sunningdale's second marriage to Susan Davis. Sir William Shawcross married the hon. Olga Polizzi as his third wife in 1993. Baroness Shawcross-Wolfson is the child of Sir William's second marriage to Michal Levin. Baron Wolfson of Aspley Guise and Baroness Shawcross-Wolfson married in 2012.

Family tree showing the relationships between Lords Forte, Shawcross, Wolfson, Wolfson of Sunningdale, Wolfson of Aspley Guise, and Baronesses Rawlings and Shawcross-Wolfson

Solomon Wolfson (1868-1941)
Sir Isaac Wolfson, 1st Baronet (1897—1991)	Charles K. Wolfson (1899—1970)	Hartley Shawcross; Baron Shawcross (1902—2003)	Charles Forte; Baron Forte (1908—2007)
Leonard Wolfson; Baron Wolfson (1927—2010)	David Wolfson; Baron Wolfson of Sunningdale (1935—2021)	Patricia Rawlings; Baroness Rawlings (b. 1937)	The Hon. Sir William Shawcross (b. 1946)	The Hon. Olga Polizzi née Forte (b. 1946)
Simon Wolfson; Baron Wolfson of Aspley Guise (b. 1967)	Eleanor Shawcross; Baroness Shawcross-Wolfson (b. 1983)

=== Sainsbury/Havers/Butler-Sloss ===
The titles held by members of the grocer Sainsbury family are

- Baron Sainsbury, of Drury Lane in the Borough of Holborn (1962, Labour);
- Baron Sainsbury of Preston Candover, of Preston Candover in the County of Hampshire (1989, Conservative); and
- Baron Sainsbury of Turville, of Turville in the County of Buckinghamshire (1990, Labour).

Michael Havers was made a life peer upon being appointed to the role of Lord Chancellor under Margaret Thatcher. His sister, Elizabeth Butler-Sloss, was later made a life peer upon recommendation by the House of Lords Appointments Commission. She was the first female Lord Justice of Appeal and the first female President of the Family Division of the High Court. She also chaired part of the inquests into the death of Diana, Princess of Wales and Dodi Fayed. The titles are

- Baron Havers, of St. Edmundsbury in the County of Suffolk (1987, Conservative) and
- Baroness Butler-Sloss, of Marsh Green in the County of Devon (2006, Crossbench).

Family tree showing the relationships between Lords Sainsbury, Havers, Sainsbury of Preston Candover, Sainsbury of Turville and The Baroness Butler-Sloss

John Benjamin Sainsbury (1871–1956)
Alan John Sainsbury; Baron Sainsbury (1902–1998)	Sir; Robert James Sainsbury (1906–2000)	Sir; Cecil Robert Havers (1889–1977)
John Davan Sainsbury; Baron Sainsbury of Preston Candover K.G. (1927–2022)	David John Sainsbury; Baron Sainsbury of Turville (b. 1940)	Robert Michael Oldfield Havers; Baron Havers (1923–1992)	Ann Elizabeth Oldfield Butler-Sloss; Baroness Butler-Sloss (b. 1933)
The Honourable; Sarah Jane Sainsbury (b. 1964)	The Honourable; Robert Joseph Neville Galmoye Butler-Sloss (b. 1962)

=== Gaitskell and Wasserman ===
Latvian-born Anna Dora Creditor (1901–1989) was a life-long Labour Party member. In 1937, after divorcing her first husband, she married Hugh Gaitskell, who went on to become Minister for Fuel and Power, Chancellor of the Exchequer, and leader of the Labour Party from 1955 until his sudden death in 1963. After being widowed, Dora Gaitskell was ennobled with a life peerage. She remained in the Labour Party during the high-profile defections to the newly created Social Democratic Party. Her younger daughter, Hon. Cresidda Gaitskell (b. 1942), married Canada-born Gordon Joshua Wasserman in 1964. After a career as a civil servant in the Home Office, and as a consultant in the private sector specialising in policing, he too was ennobled in 2011. The titles are

- Baroness Gaitskell, of Egremont in the County of Cumberland (1964, Labour), and
- Baron Wasserman, of Pimlico in the City of Westminster (2011, Conservative).
- Anna Dora Gaitskell, Baroness Gaitskell née Creditor (1901–1989)
  - Cressida Wasserman, Lady Wasserman née Gaitskell (b. 1942) = Gordon Joshua Wasserman, Baron Wasserman (b. 1938)

=== Hurd/Cowdrey/Kerr/Cameron ===
Four generations of the Hurd family have sat as Conservative MPs. The two middle generations have been given life peerages (Lord Hurd of Westwell notably serving as Foreign Secretary under Margaret Thatcher and John Major), and the youngest married the daughter of The Most Hon. the Marquess of Lothian and The Rt. Hon. the Lady Herries of Terregles in 2010. Lord Lothian also sat as a Conservative MP, and was given a life peerage upon retirement from the Commons. Despite already succeeding to his titles, he did so after the House of Lords Act 1999 removed the automatic right of hereditary peers to sit in the Lords, and so required a life peerage to be able to sit there. Lord Lothian married the 16th Lady Herries of Terregles in 1975. Her elder sister, the 14th Lady, married the cricketer Colin Cowdrey in 1985. Cowdrey was given a life peerage by outgoing Prime Minister John Major in 1997. Lord Lothian's sister Lady Cecil married the 27th Lochiel (Chief of Clan Cameron), and their son the 28th Lochiel was ennobled in 2024 upon being made Under-Secretary for Scotland and after serving as an MSP for the Highlands and Islands. The 28th Lochiel's first cousin once removed was already ennobled twenty years prior. The life peerages are

- Baron Hurd, of Newbury in the Royal County of Berkshire (1964);
- Baron Hurd of Westwell, of Westwell in the county of Oxfordshire (1997);
- Baron Cowdrey of Tonbridge, of Tonbridge in the county of Kent (1997);
- Baron Cameron of Dillington, of Dillington in the county of Somerset (2004);
- Baron Kerr of Monteviot, of Monteviot in Roxburghshire (2010); and
- Baron Cameron of Lochiel, of Achnacarry in the County of Inverness (2024)

Family tree showing the relationships between Lords Hurd, Hurd of Westwell, Cowdrey of Tonbridge, Cameron of Lochiel, Kerr of Monteviot and Cameron of Dillington

Sir Donald Walter Cameron of Lochiel; 25th Lochiel (1876—1951)
Anthony Richard Hurd; Baron Hurd (1901–1966)	Bernard Marmaduke Fitzalan-Howard; 16th Duke of Norfolk (1908–1975)	Peter Francis Walter Kerr; 12th Marquess of Lothian (1922–2004)	Sir Donald Hamish Cameron of Lochiel; 26th Lochiel (1910—2004)	Major; Allan John Cameron (1917—2011)
Douglas Richard Hurd; Baron Hurd of Westwell (b. 1930)	Michael Colin Cowdrey; Baron Cowdrey of Tonbridge (1932–2000)	Anne Elizabeth Cowdrey née Fitzalan-Howard; 14th Lady Herries of Terregles (1938–2014)	Theresa Jane Kerr née Fitzalan-Howard; 16th Lady Herries of Terregles (b. 1945)	Michael Andrew Foster Jude Kerr; 13th Marquess of Lothian; Baron Kerr of Monteviot (1945-2024)	Lady; Cecil Nennella Therese Kerr (b. 1948)	Donald Angus Cameron of Lochiel; 27th Lochiel (1946–2023)	Ewen James Hanning Cameron; Baron Cameron of Dillington (b. 1949)
Rt. Hon. Nicholas Richard Hurd (b. 1962)	Lady; Clare Therese Kerr (b. 1979)	Donald Andrew John Cameron of Lochiel; Baron Cameron of Lochiel (b. 1976)

=== Brooke ===
Both Barbara and her husband Henry Brooke were given life peerages, as was their son, Peter. The titles are:

- Baroness Brooke of Ystradfellte, of Ystradfellte in the County of Breconshire (1964)
- Baron Brooke of Cumnor, of Cumnor in the Royal County of Berkshire (1966)
- Baron Brooke of Sutton Mandeville, of Sutton Mandeville in the County of Wiltshire (2001)
- Henry Brooke, Baron Brooke of Cumnor (1903–1984) = Barbara Muriel Brooke, Baroness Brooke of Ystradfellte née Mathews (1908–2000)
  - Peter Leonard Brooke, Baron Brooke of Sutton Mandeville (1934–2023)

=== Spencer-Churchill/Soames/Sandys ===
Clementine Churchill, wife of Prime Minister Winston Churchill, was created a life peer after her husband's death. One of their daughters, Diana, married Duncan Sandys in 1935 and they divorced in 1960 before he was made a life peer. Another daughter, Mary, married Christopher Soames in 1947, who was later ennobled in like manner. Their son, Nicholas, was also ennobled. The titles are:

- Baroness Spencer-Churchill, of Chartwell in the County of Kent (1965)
- Baron Duncan-Sandys, of the City of Westminster (1974)
- Baron Soames, of Fletching in the County of East Sussex (1978)
- Baron Soames of Fletching, of Fletching in the County of East Sussex (2022)
- Clementine Ogilvy Spencer-Churchill, Baroness Spencer-Churchill (1885–1977)
  - Diana Churchill (1909–1963) ≠ Edwin Duncan Sandys, Baron Duncan-Sandys (1908–1987)
  - Mary Soames, Lady Soames née Spencer-Churchill (1922–2014) = Arthur Christopher John Soames, Baron Soames (1920–1987)
    - Arthur Nicholas Winston Soames, Baron Soames of Fletching (b. 1948)

=== Sieff, Weidenfeld and Haslam ===
Israel Sieff, Baron Sieff and his son Marcus Sieff, Baron Sieff of Brimpton were both chairmen of Marks and Spencer in which their family was long involved through intermarriage with the founding family of Baron Marks of Broughton. Sieff, a notable Zionist, married Rebecca Marks, a co-founder of the Women's International Zionist Organization, in 1910. Sieff's elder son, Hon. Michael, married Elizabeth Pitt as his second wife and she in turn, after being widowed, married Lord Haslam in 1996. Sieff's niece, Jane, married Lord Weidenfeld, co-founder of publisher Weidenfeld & Nicolson, in 1952 but they divorced in 1955. The titles are:

- Baron Sieff of Brimpton in the Royal County of Berkshire (1966, Conservative)
- Baron Weidenfeld, of Chelsea in Greater London (1976, Labour)
- Baron Sieff of Brimpton, of Brimpton in the Royal County of Berkshire (1980, Conservative)
- Baron Haslam, of Bolton in the County of Greater Manchester (1990, Conservative)

Family tree showing the relationships between Lords Marks of Broughton, Sieff, Sieff of Brimpton, Weidenfeld and Haslam

Michael Marks (c.1859—1907)	Ephraim Sieff
Barons Marks of Broughton (hereditary)	Rebecca Dora Sieff OBE née Marks (1890—1966)	Israel Moses Sieff; Baron Sieff (1889—1972)	Joseph Edward Sieff (1906—1982)
Hon. Michael David Sieff CBE (1911–1987)	Elizabeth Pitt	Robert Haslam; Baron Haslam (1923—2002)	Marcus Joseph Sieff; Baron Sieff of Brimpton (1913—2001)	Jane Sieff	Arthur George Weidenfeld; Baron Weidenfeld (1919—2016)

=== Ardwick and Johnson ===
John Beavan (1910–1994), a left wing newspaper editor and Labour Party MEP, was ennobled in 1970. In 2021, his granddaughter Carrie Symonds (b. 1988) married then Prime Minister Boris Johnson (whose father incidentally served as a Conservative Party MEP), who recommended his brother, the former Universities Minister Jo (b. 1971), to be ennobled in 2020. The titles are:

- Baron Ardwick, of Barnes in the London Borough of Richmond upon Thames (1970, Labour)
- Baron Johnson of Marylebone, of Marylebone in the City of Westminster (2020, Conservative)

Family tree showing the relationships between Lords Ardwick and Johnson of Marylebone

John Beavan; Baron Ardwick (1910–1994)
The Honourable; Matthew Symonds (b. 1953)	Stanley Johnson (b. 1940)
Carrie Symonds (b. 1988)	The Right Honourable; Boris Johnson (b. 1964)	Jo Johnson; Baron Johnson of Marylebone (b. 1971)

=== Shinwell and Berger ===
Both Labour politicians who were MPs and then subsequently ennobled with life peerages, Manny Shinwell (1884—1986) and Luciana Berger (b. 1981) are great-uncle and great-niece to one another. Shinwell was notably Secretary for Mines and later Minister for War, and celebrated his hundredth birthday in the House of Lords. Berger was a Shadow Minister for around 6 years while a Labour MP, and notably left the Labour Party in February 2019. She was one of the six founding MPs of 'The Independent Group', which later became Change UK. She left Change UK to sit as an independent in July 2019, then joined the Liberal Democrats the following month. Then-Leader of the Opposition Sir Keir Starmer invited Berger to rejoin the Labour Party in February 2023, and subsequently nominated her for a life peerage in December 2024. The titles are:

- Baron Shinwell of Easington in the County of Durham (19 June 1970, Labour)
- Baroness Berger, of Barnhill in the London Borough of Brent (AM 6 February 2025, Labour)

=== Tweedsmuir and Selkirk ===
Priscilla Grant née Thomson, who was ennobled in 1970, married the 2nd Baron Tweedsmuir as her second husband in 1948, after being widowed. Their only daughter, Hon. Priscilla, married Lord James Douglas-Hamilton, a Conservative MP, in 1974. In 1994, Lord James's uncle George Douglas-Hamilton, 10th Earl of Selkirk died, and, due to its unique remainder, it appeared Lord James had succeeded to the title. While this was disputed, Lord James was obliged to disclaim the earldom in order to remain an MP under the terms of the Peerage Act 1963, and felt obliged to do so in view of the small majority the Conservative Government had in the House of Commons at that time. After being unseated in the 1997 general election, which was a landslide for the Labour Party, Lord James received a life peerage. The titles are:

- Baroness Tweedsmuir of Belhelvie, of Potterton in the County of Aberdeen (1970)
- Baron Selkirk of Douglas, of Cramond in the City of Edinburgh (1997)

Family tree showing the relationships between Baroness Tweedsmuir of Belvelvie and Baron Selkirk of Douglas

John Buchan; 2nd Baron Tweedsmuir (1911—1996)		Priscilla Buchan; Lady Tweedsmuir; Baroness Tweedsmuir of Belhelvie (1915—1978)
	Hon. Priscilla Susan Buchan	James Douglas-Hamilton; Baron Selkirk of Douglas; 11th Earl of Selkirk 1994 (1942—2023)

=== Hogg and Boyd-Carpenter ===
Aside from the hereditary Barony and Viscountcy Hailsham, of Hailsham in the County of Sussex created for Douglas Hogg, four members of these families have been given life peerages. Quintin Hogg, 2nd Viscount Hailsham disclaimed his hereditary peerage in 1963, allowing him to take up a seat in the House of Commons. He was later given a life peerage in 1970 when he was appointed to the role of Lord High Chancellor of Great Britain. His daughter-in-law was likewise ennobled for life as was her father. The 3rd Viscount was also given a life peerage, which enables him to sit in the House of Lords following the House of Lords Act 1999, which automatically excludes most hereditary peers. The life peerages are

- Baron Boyd-Carpenter, of Crux Easton in the County of Southampton (1972, Conservative);
- Baron Hailsham of Saint Marylebone, of Herstmonceux in the County of Sussex (1970, Conservative);
- Baroness Hogg, of Kettlethorpe in the County of Lincolnshire (1995, ); and
- Baron Hailsham of Kettlethorpe, of Kettlethorpe in the County of Lincolnshire (2015,).

Family tree showing the relationships between Lords Hailsham of St Marylebone, Hailsham of Kettlethorpe, Boyd-Carpenter and Baroness Hogg

Quintin McGarel Hogg; Baron Hailsham of St Marylebone; 2nd Viscount Hailsham 1950–1963 (1907–2001)	John Boyd-Carpenter; Baron Boyd-Carpenter (1908–1998)
Douglas Martin Hogg; 3rd Viscount Hailsham; Baron Hailsham of Kettlethorpe (b. 1945)	Sarah Elizabeth Mary Hogg née Boyd-Carpenter; Viscountess Hailsham; Baroness Hogg (b. 1946)

=== Ballantrae and Renton of Mount Harry ===
Bernard Fergusson (1911—1980), the final British-born Governor of New Zealand, was the youngest surviving son of Sir Charles Fergusson, 7th Baronet, of Kilkerran (1865—1951). One of Sir Charles's eldest son's daughters, Alice Fergusson, married the former Minister of the Arts and man who came up with the idea for the National Lottery Tim Renton (1932—2020). Both Bernard Fergusson and Renton were ennobled with life peerages. The titles are:

- Baron Ballantrae, of Auchairne in the County of Ayr and of the Bay of Islands in New Zealand (10/07/1972)
- Baron Renton of Mount Harry, of Offham in the County of East Sussex (PM9/06/97)
- General Sir Charles Fergusson of Kilkerran, 7th Baronet (1865—1951)
  - Sir James Fergusson of Kilkerran, 8th Baronet (1904—1973)
    - Alice, Lady Renton née Fergusson = Ronald Timothy Renton, Baron Renton of Mount Harry (1932—2020)
  - Brigadier Bernard Edward Fergusson, Baron Ballantrae (1911—1980)

=== Rayne/Vane-Tempest-Stewart/Goldsmith ===
The two daughters of the 8th Marquess of Londonderry connect two life peers; through marriage in one case through descent in the other. Lord Londonderry's elder daughter Lady Jane Vane-Tempest-Stewart married Sir Max Rayne in 1965. Lord Londonderry's younger daughter Lady Annabel Vane-Tempest-Stewart married Sir James Goldsmith (knighted in Harold Wilson's so-called 'lavender list'); one of their sons, Zac Goldsmith, was given a life peerage by Prime Minister Boris Johnson to enable him to stay on in the Cabinet after losing his Richmond Park seat in the 2019 snap General Election. The titles are

- Baron Rayne, of Prince's Meadow in Greater London (1976)
- Baron Goldsmith of Richmond Park, of Richmond Park in the London Borough of Richmond upon Thames (2020)
- Edward Charles Robert Vane-Tempest-Stewart, 8th Marquess of Londonderry (1902–1955)
  - Lady Jane Antonia Frances Rayne, Lady Rayne née Vane-Tempest-Stewart (b. 1932) = Max Rayne, Baron Rayne (1918–2003)
  - Lady Annabel Goldsmith née Vane-Tempest-Stewart (b. 1934) = Sir James Michael Goldsmith (1933–1997)
    - Frank Zacharias Robin Goldsmith, Baron Goldsmith of Richmond Park (b. 1975)

=== Jay/Callaghan/Hunt/Bottomley/Swann/Ussher ===
The following life peers are related:

- Baron Swann, of Coln St. Denys in the County of Gloucestershire (1981)
- Baron Jay, of Battersea in Greater London (1987)
- Baron Callaghan of Cardiff, of the City of Cardiff in the County of South Glamorgan (1987)
- Baroness Jay of Paddington, of Paddington in the City of Westminster (1992)
- Baron Hunt of Chesterton, of Chesterton in the County of Cambridgeshire (2000)
- Baroness Bottomley of Nettlestone, of St Helens, in the county of the Isle of Wight (2005)
- Baron Jay of Ewelme, of Ewelme, in the County of Oxfordshire (2006)
- Baroness Ussher, of Burnley in the county of Lancashire (2026)

Peggy Garnett married Douglas Jay in 1933, but later divorced. Christopher Garnett is married to the Hon. Su Garnett. Margaret Callaghan married Peter Jay in 1961. They divorced in 1986, and Lady Jay of Paddington has since remarried.

Lord Oakeshott of Seagrove Bay is apparently closely related to Lady Bottomley of Nettlestone, but it is unclear how exactly. Lord Hunt of Chesterton is related in the male line to John Samuel Hunt, as was Lord Hunt of Hawley, although this relation is very distant.

Baroness Ussher is the niece of Sir Peter Bottomley who is married to Baroness Bottomley of Nettlestone.

James Clerk Maxwell Garnett (1880–1958)	Edward Jay
Michael Meredith Swann; Baron Swann (1920–1990)	William John Poulton Maxwell Garnett (1921–1997)	Sir James Reginald Alfred Bottomley; KCMG (1920—2013)	Pauline Hunt née Garnett	Leonard James Callaghan; Baron Callaghan of Cardiff KG (1912–2005)	Margaret Christian "Peggy" Jay née Garnett (1913–2008)	Douglas Patrick Thomas Jay; Baron Jay (1907–1996)	Captain Alan David Hastings Jay, DSO DSC RN (1904–1978)
The Hon. Su Garnett née Swann	Christopher Garnett	Virginia Hilda Brunette Maxwell Bottomley née Garnett; Baroness Bottomley of Nettlestone (b. 1948)	Sir Peter James Bottomley (b. 1944)	Susan Whitfield née Bottomley	Julian Charles Roland Hunt; Baron Hunt of Chesterton (1941 - 2026)	Margaret Ann Jay née Callaghan; Baroness Jay of Paddington (b. 1939)	The Hon. Peter Jay (1937 - 2024)	Michael Hastings Jay; Baron Jay of Ewelme (b. 1946)
Katharine Anne Ussher; Baroness Ussher (b. 1971)

=== Wright and McDonald ===
Patrick Richard Henry Wright (1931–2020) was a diplomat and civil servant, notably serving as Head of HM Diplomatic Service and Private Secretary (Overseas Affairs) to two Prime Ministers, Harold Wilson and James Callaghan from 1974 to 1977. His only daughter, Olivia (b. 1963), married Simon McDonald (b. 1961) in 1989. McDonald is also a diplomat and civil servant, notably being the last professional head of the Foreign & Commonwealth Office before the creation of the Foreign, Commonwealth and Development Office. He was nominated for a life peerage in 2020. The titles are:

- Baron Wright of Richmond, of Richmond-upon-Thames in the London Borough of Richmond-upon-Thames (1994)
- Baron McDonald of Salford, of Pendleton in the City of Salford (2021)

=== Neuberger ===
Julia Schwab, who married Professor Anthony Neuberger, is Britain's second female Rabbi (serving at the South London Liberal Synagogue from 1977 to 1989). A former member of the Social Democratic Party, she stood unsuccessfully for Tooting in 1983. She was later ennobled in 2004, sitting with the Liberal Democrats, but joined the Crossbenches after being appointed Senior Rabbi at the West London Synagogue in 2011. Her brother-in-law was appointed a Lord of Appeal in Ordinary in 2005, and later served as President of the new Supreme Court of the United Kingdom (analogous to the position of Senior Law Lord).

- Baroness Neuberger, of Primrose Hill in the London Borough of Camden (Liberal Democrat, 2004)
- Baron Neuberger of Abbotsbury, of Abbotsbury in the County of Dorset (Law Lord, 2007)
- Albert Neuberger (1908–1996)
  - Professor Anthony Neuberger = Rabbi Julia Babette Sarah Neuberger, Baroness Neuberger née Schwab (b. 1950)
  - David Edmond Neuberger, Baron Neuberger of Abbotsbury (b. 1948)

== Those related by blood ==
=== Watson of Thankerton ===
Both William Watson (1827–1899) and his third son, William Watson (1873–1948), were high ranking judges. Each was appointed Lord Advocate, and subsequently a Lord of Appeal in Ordinary. The titles are

- Baron Watson, of Thankerton, in the County of Lanark (1880) and
- Baron Thankerton of Thankerton in the County of Lanark (1929).

=== The Barons Parker of Waddington ===
The title was created for father and son. Robert Parker (1857–1918) was a Lord of Appeal in Ordinary; his third and youngest son Hubert (1900–1972) was a senior judge unusually appointed to the role of Lord Chief Justice of England by Prime Minister Harold Macmillan. The latter's title was created under the Life Peerages Act. The titles are

- Baron Parker of Waddington, of Waddington in the county of York (1913) and
- Baron Parker of Waddington, of Lincoln's Inn in the Borough of Holborn (1958).

=== Younger ===
Aside from the hereditary Viscountcy Younger of Leckie, of Alloa in the County of Clackmannan (1923), two members of the Younger family have been ennobled for life. The younger brother of the first Viscount was a Law Lord and the 4th Viscount was given a peerage in the lifetime of his father, there being no possibility of a writ in acceleration as the Viscounts have no subsidiary barony. The life peerages are

- Baron Blanesburgh, of Alloa in the County of Clackmannanshire (1923, Law Lord)
- Baron Younger of Prestwick, of Ayr in the District of Kyle and Carrick (1992, Conservative)
- James Younger
  - George Younger, 1st Viscount Younger of Leckie (1851–1929)
    - James Younger, 2nd Viscount Younger of Leckie (1880–1946)
      - Edward George Younger, 3rd Viscount Younger of Leckie (1906–1997)
        - , George Kenneth Hotson Younger, Baron Younger of Prestwick, 4th Viscount Younger of Leckie (1931–2003)
          - James Edward George Younger, 5th Viscount Younger of Leckie (b. 1955)
  - Robert Younger, Baron Blanesburgh (1861–1946)

=== Atkin and Low ===
Sir Richard Atkin (1867—1944) was a very notable Law Lord who gave the leading judgement in Donoghue v Stevenson which widened the principle of liability for negligence in delict and tort law through use of the Christian 'neighbour' principle, stating 'The rule that you are to love your neighbour becomes in law, you must not injure your neighbour; and the lawyer's question, Who is my neighbour? receives a restricted reply. You must take reasonable care to avoid acts or omissions which you can reasonably foresee would be likely to injure your neighbour. Who, then, in law, is my neighbour? The answer seems to be – persons who are so closely and directly affected by my act that I ought reasonably to have them in contemplation as being so affected when I am directing my mind to the acts or omissions which are called in question.' This is the basis of the modern law of Negligence in England and Wales.

One of his daughters, Hon. Lucy Atkin, was the mother of Toby Low (1914—2000). Low was a soldier and later a Conservative Party MP. He was given an hereditary peerage in 1962 and, since he lived beyond 11 November 1999, was automatically excluded from the House of Lords by the House of Lords Act 1999. Because he was granted his hereditary peerage instead of inheriting it (at the time it was said his peerage was 'of first creation'), he, as well as a small handful of others, was offered a life peerage to return to the House, the point being to exclude people who had inherited their titles, rather than those who had been granted them. The life peerages are:

- Baron Atkin of Aberdovey in the County of Merioneth (6 February 1928, Law Lord)
- Baron Low, of Bispham in the county of Lancashire (9AM 16 November 1999, Conservative)

=== Keith ===
Both James Keith (1886–1964) and his only son, Henry Shanks Keith (1920–2002), were high-ranking judges. Both were Senators of the College of Justice and subsequently Law Lords, each taking the Scottish judicial title Lord Keith in 1937 and 1971 respectively, and then taking the following titles upon being made Law Lords:

- Baron Keith of Avonholm of Saint Bernard's in the City of Edinburgh (1953) and
- Baron Keith of Kinkel, of Strathtummel in the District of Perth and Kinross (1977).

=== Morrison and Mandelson ===
Both notable Labour Party politicians, Herbert Morrison and his grandson Peter Mandelson were given life peerages. Morrison held the position of Deputy Prime Minister and Leader of the House of Commons under Clement Attlee, later 1st Earl Attlee, as well as several other Cabinet positions. Mandelson was a key figure in the 'New Labour' movement and a close confidant of 'New Labour' Prime Minister Tony Blair, who appointed him to several Cabinet positions, as well as to the position of European Commissioner for Trade. The titles are

- Baron Morrison of Lambeth, of Lambeth in the County of London (1959) and
- Baron Mandelson, of Foy in the County of Herefordshire and of Hartlepool in the County of Durham (2008)
- Herbert Stanley Morrison, Baron Morrison of Lambeth (1888–1965)
  - Hon. Mary Joyce Mandelson née Morrison (1921–2006)
    - Peter Benjamin Mandelson, Baron Mandelson (b. 1953)

=== Foot ===
Two of Liberal politician and solicitor Isaac Foot's children were given life peerages. Hugh was a British colonial administrator and diplomat, rising to the position of Permanent Representative of the United Kingdom to the United Nations. John, considered by his brother Michael (leader of the Labour Party from 1980–3) to be the best orator and the "ablest member of the family", was a Liberal politician. Michael refused a life peerage. The titles are:

- Baron Caradon, of St. Cleer in the County of Cornwall (27 October 1964, Labour)
- Baron Foot, of Buckland Monachorum in the County of Devon (29 November 1967, Liberal)
- Isaac Foot (1880–1960)
  - Hugh Mackintosh Foot, Baron Caradon (1907–1990)
  - John Mackintosh Foot, Baron Foot (1909–1999)

=== Bannerman and Michie ===
Both John Bannerman and his daughter Ray Michie were ennobled for life. Their titles are

- Baron Bannerman of Kildonan, of Kildonan in the County of Sutherland (1967, Scottish Liberal)
- Baroness Michie of Gallanach, of Oban in Argyll and Bute (2001, Liberal Democrat).

=== O'Neill ===
Members of the O'Neill dynasty (whose members hold the hereditary peerages Baron O'Neill, of Shanes Castle, in the county of Antrim (1868) and Baron Rathcavan, of The Braid in the County of Antrim (1953), and who are distantly related to the Chichesters (headed by the Marquess of the County of Donegal), Captain Terence Marne O'Neill and Onora Sylvia O'Neill were both ennobled as life peers. They are second cousins, sharing Edward O'Neill, 2nd Baron O'Neill as an ancestor. Terence was a leader of the Ulster Unionist Party and antepenultimate Prime Minister of Northern Ireland from 1963 to 1969. He was followed in these roles by his 8th cousin James Chichester-Clarke. Onora is a distinguished philosopher, former President of the British Academy, and member (and honorary member) of many other learned institutions including the Royal Irish Academy. She was also Chair of the Equality and Human Rights Commission, and is President of the Society for Applied Philosophy. Their titles are

- Baron O'Neill of the Maine, of Ahoghill in the County of Antirm (1970, Ulster Unionist Party) and
- Baroness O'Neill of Bengarve, of The Braid in the County of Antrim (1999, Crossbench)

Both are related in the male line to Lt-Col. Hon. John Chichester (1609–1643/7/8), son of Edward Chichester, 1st Viscount Chichester (c. 1568–1648), who is related in the male line to Marion Caroline Dehra Chichester (1904–1976), mother of James Dawson Chichester-Clarke, who followed Lord O'Neill of the Maine as leader of the UUP and who was the penultimate Northern Irish PM from 1969 to 1971. During the leadership election, O'Neill cast the tiebreaking vote in Chichester-Clarke's favour, although it has been suggested that this support was not due to a familial connection but rather politicking. Chichester-Clarke was later ennobled with the title Baron Moyola, of Castledawson in the County of Londonderry (1971, Ulster Unionist Party)

- Edward O'Neill, 2nd Baron O'Neill (1839–1928)
  - Captain Hon. Arthur O'Neill (1876–1914)
    - Terence Marne O'Neill, Baron O'Neill of the Maine (1914–1990)
  - (Robert William) Hugh O'Neill, 1st Baron Rathcavan (1883–1982)
    - Hon. Sir Con Douglas Walter O'Neill (1912–1988)
      - Onora Sylvia O'Neill, Baroness O'Neill of Bengarve (b. 1941)

=== Janner ===
Both Barnett Janner (1892–1982) and his son, Greville Ewan Janner (1928–2015), served as Members of Parliament for Leicester West, Greville directly following his father. They were both subsequently ennobled with life peerages, which are

- Baron Janner, of the City of Leicester (1970, Labour)
- Baron Janner of Braunstone, of Leicester in the County of Leicestershire (1997, Labour).

=== Mackie ===
Brothers John Mackie (1909–1994) and George Mackie (1919–2015), formerly Labour and Liberal MPs respectively, were both created life peers. Their titles are

- Baron Mackie of Benshie, of Kirriemuir in the County of Angus (1974, Liberal) and
- Baron John-Mackie, of Nazeing in the County of Essex (1981, Labour).

=== Fraser ===
Ian Fraser was ennobled as a Law Lord in 1975. His son, a former Treasurer of the Conservative Party, was ennobled in David Cameron's Resignation Honours List. The titles are

- Baron Fraser of Tullybelton, of Bankfoot in the County of Perth (1975, Law Lord), and
- Baron Fraser of Corriegarth, Corriegarth in the County of Inverness (2016, Conservative).

=== Descendants of the 27th Earl of Crawford ===
Just under a year before succeeding to the Earldoms, Robert Lindsay (then styled Lord Balniel) was given a life peerage. It is notable that he entered the House of Lords in this way, as he could conceivably have entered by writ in acceleration using one of his father's junior titles (such as the Wigan Barony, or even the Lindsay and Balniel Lordship of Parliament, with which he was then styling himself). Two of his first cousins were also ennobled for life, Baroness Manningham-Buller being the second daughter of Rt. Hon. Viscount Dilhorne, first holder of the most junior viscountcy. The titles are

- Baron Balniel, of Pitcorthie in the County of Fife (1975),
- Baroness Nicholson of Winterbourne, of Winterbourne, in the Royal County of Berkshire (1997), and
- Baroness Manningham-Buller, of Northampton in the County of Northamptonshire (2008).
- David Alexander Edward Lindsay, 27th Earl of Crawford and 10th Earl of Balcarres (1871–1940)
  - David Alexander Robert Lindsay, 28th Earl of Crawford and 11th Earl of Balcarres (1900–1975)
    - , Robert Alexander Lindsay, Baron Balniel, subsequently 29th Earl of Crawford and 12th Earl of Balcarres (1927–2023)
  - Lady Mary Lilian Manningham-Buller née Lindsay (1910–2004)
    - Elizabeth Lydia Manningham-Buller, Baroness Manningham-Buller (b. 1948)
  - Lady Katharine Constance Nicholson née Lindsay (1912–1972)
    - Emma Harriet Nicholson, Baroness Nicholson of Winterbourne (b. 1941)

=== Vaizey ===
John Ernest Vaizey (1929–1984), an economist specialising in education, was given a life peerage in Labour Prime Minister Harold Wilson's so-called 'lavender list'. His son, Ed Vaizey (b. 1968), was a Conservative MP, and was given a life peerage by Conservative PM Boris Johnson in the delayed 2019 Dissolution Honours list.

- Baron Vaizey, of Greenwich in Greater London (Labour, 1976)
- Baron Vaizey of Didcot, of Wantage in the County of Oxfordshire (Conservative, 2020)

=== Young ===
Michael Dunlop Young (1915—2002), an influential left-wing sociologist who wrote the Labour Party's 1945 election manifesto and was involved in the establishment of the Social Science Research Council and the Open University, was ennobled with a life peerage during the tenure of Prime Minister James Callaghan. Toby (b. 1963), his son from his second marriage, was also ennobled with a life peerage, being nominated by the Leader of the Opposition Kemi Badenoch. Toby is an influential right-wing journalist who is associate editor of The Spectator, founder of the Free Speech Union and a proponent of free schools. Their titles are

- Baron Young of Dartington, of Dartington in the County of Devon (1978, Labour), and
- Baron Young of Acton, of Acton in the London Borough of Ealing (2025, Conservative).

=== McAlpine ===
Edwin McAlpine (1907—1990), later to succeed to the McAlpine baronetcy, and his second son Alistair McAlpine were given life peerages. The former is best known for leading the family business and the latter for his service to the Conservative Party. The titles are

- Baron McAlpine of Moffat, of Medmenham in the County of Buckinghamshire (1980), and
- Baron McAlpine of West Green, of West Green in the County of Hampshire (1984).

=== Maude ===
Angus Edmund Upton Maude (1912–1993), was a Conservative MP and rose to the position of Paymaster General. His second son, Francis Anthony Aylmer Maude (b. 1953) also became a Conservative MP and served in numerous cabinet positions, culminating in the roles of Minister for the Cabinet Office and Paymaster General. At the 1983 General Election, Angus stood down from the Commons (receiving a life peerage) and Francis entered Parliament. Francis was ennobled with a life peerage when he stood down from Parliament in 2015, and was subsequently appointed a Minister of State for Trade and Investment. The titles are

- Baron Maude of Stratford-upon-Avon, of Stratford-upon-Avon in the county of Warwickshire (1983) and
- Baron Maude of Horsham, of Shipley in the County of West Sussex (2015).

=== Prior ===
Both Jim Prior (1927—2016) and his eldest son David (b. 1954) were Conservative MPs for East Anglian seats, and then both subsequently became life peers. Jim held a series of Ministerial posts, culminating in his serving as Secretary of State for Northern Ireland. David notably became chair of NHS England after being ennobled. Their titles are

- Baron Prior, of Brampton in the County of Suffolk (1987); and
- Baron Prior of Brampton, of Swannington in the County of Norfolk (2015).

=== Palumbo ===
Both Peter Palumbo and his eldest son, James, were ennobled. Their titles are

- Baron Palumbo, of Walbrook in the City of London (1991); and
- Baron Palumbo of Southwark, of Southwark in the London Borough of Southwark (2013).

=== Lane-Fox ===
The titles held by members of the Lane-Fox family are

- Baroness Lane-Fox, of Bramham in the County of West Yorkshire (1981) and
- Baroness Lane-Fox of Soho, of Soho in the City of Westminster (2013).
- Captain Edward Lane-Fox (1874–1949)
  - James Henry Lane-Fox (b. 1912)
    - Robin James Lane Fox (b. 1946)
      - Martha Lane Fox, Baroness Lane-Fox of Soho (b. 1973)
  - Felicity Lane-Fox, Baroness Lane-Fox (1918–1988)

=== Smith ===
After John Smith QC MP, Leader of the Labour Party, died of a heart attack in 1994, his widow Elizabeth Margaret Smith was ennobled. Their youngest daughter the Hon. Catherine Smith KC, who took silk in 2021, was appointed Advocate General for Scotland by newly-elected Prime Minister Sir Keir Starmer KC in 2024 and subsequently ennobled. The titles are

- Baroness Smith of Gilmorehill, of Gilmorehill in the District of the City of Glasgow (1995, Labour)
- Baroness Smith of Cluny, of Cluny in the City of Edinburgh (2024, Labour)

=== Gummer ===
Two of the sons of the Reverend Canon Selwyn Gummer (1907–1999) were ennobled. Both John (b. 1939) and Peter Selwyn Gummer (b. 1942) are Conservative politicians, with John serving as Chairman of the party, and as Secretary of State for the Environment. Their titles are

- Baron Chadlington, of Dean in the County of Oxfordshire (1996, Conservative); and
- Baron Deben, of Winston in the County of Suffolk (2010, Conservative)

=== Pitkeathley ===
Jill Pitkeathley (b. 1940) and her son, Simon (b. 1964), both Labour Party politicians, were ennobled with life peerages. Their titles are

- Baroness Pitkeathley, of Caversham in the Royal County of Berkshire (AM 6 October 1997, Labour); and
- Baron Pitkeathley of Camden Town, of Tufnell Park in the London Borough of Islington (PM 24 January 2025, Labour)

=== Morris ===
Alf Morris, his brother Charles, and Charles's daughter Estelle were all Labour Members of Parliament. Alf and Estelle were both ennobled for life, their titles being

- Baron Morris of Manchester, of Manchester, in the County of Greater Manchester (PM 6th October 1997, Labour); and
- Baroness Morris of Yardley, of Yardley, in the County of West Midlands (2005, Labour)
- George Morris
  - Rt. Hon. Charles Richard Morris (1926–2012)
    - Estelle Morris, Baroness Morris of Yardley (b. 1952)
  - Alfred Morris, Baron Morris of Manchester (1928–2012)

=== Ponsonby ===
Two members of the Ponsonby family, both descendants of the 3rd Earl of Bessborough, have life peerages. The 4th Lord Ponsonby of Shulbrede (b. 1958), a descendant of the 1st Lord, one of the first Labour hereditary peers who had heirs, sat on the Labour benches after inheriting his title in 1990 and was excluded from the House of Lords under the House of Lords Act 1999. He was not elected to one of the two Labour party places and to any of the places for those elected by the whole House. He was one of the seven Labour and Liberal Democrat peers who were given life peerages in April 2000 to enable them to return to the House, and later served as Deputy Speaker of the House.

His sixth cousin once removed, 7th Lord de Mauley (b. 1957), was the first hereditary peer who had inherited his title after the general exclusion of hereditary peers to have won a by-election to sit in the House as an excepted hereditary peer, inheriting in 2002. He was by-elected in March 2005 by the Conservative hereditaries, taking the room of 6th Lord Burnham. He later served as Master of the Horse. After the exclusion of the remaining hereditary peers under the House of Lords (Hereditary Peers) Act 2026, he was one of 15 Conservative hereditary peers who was given a life peerage to enable him to return to the House. In this way, both cousins sat as hereditary peers before being excluded, then returned each with their own life peerage. These life peerages are:

- Baron Ponsonby of Roehampton, of Shulbrede in the County of West Sussex (12 noon 19 April 2000, Labour)
- Baron de Mauley of Canford, of Canford in the County of Gloucestershire (AM 5 June 2026, Conservative)
- Frederick Ponsonby, 3rd Earl of Bessborough (1758 - 1844)
  - Maj-Gen Hon. Sir Frederick Cavendish Ponsonby (1783 - 1837)
    - General Rt. Hon. Sir Henry Frederick Ponsonby (1825 - 1895)
      - Arthur Augustus William Harry Ponsonby, 1st Baron Ponsonby of Shulbrede (1871 - 1946)
        - Matthew Henry Herbert Ponsonby, 2nd Baron Ponsonby of Shulbrede (1904 - 1976)
          - Thomas Arthur Ponsonby, 3rd Baron Ponsonby of Shulbrede (1930 - 1990)
            - Frederick Matthew Thomas Ponsonby, 4th Baron Ponsonby of Shulbrede, Baron Ponsonby of Roehampton (born 1958)
  - William Francis Spencer Ponsonby, 1st Baron de Mauley (1787 - 1855)
    - Charles Frederick Ashley Cooper Ponsonby, 2nd Baron de Mauley (1815 - 1896)
      - Maurice John George Ponsonby, 4th Baron de Mauley (1846 - 1945)
        - Hubert William Ponsonby, 5th Baron de Mauley (1878 - 1962)
          - Colonel Hon. Thomas Maurice Ponsonby (1930 - 2001)
            - (15) Rupert Charles Ponsonby, 7th Baron de Mauley, Baron de Mauley of Canford (born 1957)

=== Boswell and Prentis ===
Tim Boswell (1942—2025) and his daughter Victoria Prentis (b. 1971) were made life peers in 2010 and 2025 respectively. Both were Conservative Party MPs, Boswell rising to be Parliamentary Secretary to the Ministry of Agriculture, Fisheries and Food and Parliamentary Under-Secretary of State for Education, and Prentis rising to be Attorney General for England and Wales and Attorney General for Northern Ireland. Boswell left the Conservative Party in the Lords two years after being ennobled. Prentis notably delivered her maiden speech in the House of Lords immediately before her father's valedictory speech. Their titles are:

- Baron Boswell of Aynho, of Aynho in the county of Northamptonshire (PM 8 July 2010, Conservative)
- Baroness Prentis of Banbury, of Somerton in the County of Oxfordshire (AM 13 May 2025, Conservative)

=== Hendy ===
Both John Hendy KC (b. 1948) and his brother, Sir Peter Hendy, CBE (b. 1953) were ennobled. John is a barrister, who often represents unions and union members, such as National Union of Journalists member Dave Wilson in the case Wilson and Palmer v United Kingdom [2002] ECHR 552. Peter works in transport, latterly as Commissioner of Transport for London, and currently as the chair of Network Rail. The brothers' mother is the youngest daughter of the 6th Baron Wynford, of Wynford Eagle in the County of Dorset (1829). Their titles are:

- Baron Hendy, of Hayes and Harlington in the London Borough of Hillingdon (2019, Labour)
- Baron Hendy of Richmond Hill, of Imber in the County of Wiltshire (2022, Crossbench)

== Those related by marriage ==
=== Hereditary Peers who married Life Peers (6) ===
- 1st Viscount Davidson (1937) and
- Viscountess Davidson and Baroness Northchurch, of Chiswick in the County of Middlesex married in 1919 until Viscount Davidson's death in 1970.

- 2nd Earl of Swinton (1955) and
- Countess of Swinton and Baroness Masham of Ilton, of Masham in the North Riding of the County of York (1970) married in 1959 until Earl of Swinton's death in 2006.

- 2nd Baron Tweedsmuir (1935) and
- Baroness Tweedsmuir and Baroness Tweedsmuir of Belhelvie, of Potterton in the County of Aberdeen (1970) married in 1948 until Lady Tweedsmuir of Belhelvie's death in 1978.

- 2nd Viscount Eccles (1964) and
- Viscountess Eccles and Baroness Eccles of Moulton, of Moulton in the County of North Yorkshire (1990) married in 1955.

- 3rd Viscount Hailsham and Baron Hailsham of Kettlethorpe, of Kettlethorpe in the County of Lincolnshire (1929, 2015) and
- Viscountess Hailsham and Baroness Hogg, of Kettlethorpe in the County of Lincolnshire (1995) married in 1968.

- Baron Cowdrey of Tonbridge, of Tonbridge in the County of Kent (1997) and
- 14th Lady Herries of Terregles and Baroness Cowdrey of Tonbridge (1490) married in 1985 until Lord Cowdrey of Tonbridge's death in 2000.

=== Life Peers who married each other (19) ===
- Baron Brooke of Cumnor, in the Royal County of Berkshire (1966) and
- Baroness Brooke of Ystradfellte, of Ystradfellte in the County of Brecknock (1964) married in 1933 until Lord Brooke of Cumnor's death in 1984.

- Baron Llewelyn-Davies, of Hastoe in the County of Hertfordshire (1964) and
- Baroness Llewelyn-Davies of Hastoe, of Hastoe in the County of Hertfordshire (1967) married in 1943 until Lord Llewelyn-Davies's death in 1981.

- Baron Delacourt-Smith, of New Windsor in the Royal County of Berkshire (1967) and
- Baroness Delacourt-Smith of Alteryn, of Alteryn in the County of Gwent (1974) married in 1939 until Lord Delacourt-Smith's death in 1972.

- Baron Castle, of Islington in Greater London (1974) and
- Baroness Castle of Blackburn, of Ibstone in the County of Buckinghamshire (1990) married in 1944 until Lord Castle's death in 1979.

- Baron Stewart of Fulham, of Fulham in Greater London (1979) and
- Baroness Stewart of Alvechurch, of Fulham in Greater London (1975) married in 1941 until Stewart of Alvechurch's death in 1984.

- Baron Cheshire, of Woodhall in the County of Lincolnshire (1991) and
- Baroness Ryder of Warsaw, of Warsaw in Poland and of Cavendish in the County of Suffolk (1979) married in 1959 until Lord Cheshire's death in 1992.

- Baron Griffiths, of Govilon, in the County of Gwent (1985) and
- Baroness Brigstocke, of Kensington in the Royal Borough of Kensington and Chelsea (1990) married in 2000 until Lady Brigstocke's death in 2004.

- Baron Howe of Aberavon, of Tandridge in the County of Surrey (1992) and
- Baroness Howe of Idlicote, of Shipston-on-Stour in the County of Warwickshire (2001) married in 1953 until Lord Howe of Aberavon's death in 2015.

- Baron Thomas of Gresford, of Gresford in the County Borough of Wrexham (1996)
- Baroness Walmsley, of West Derby in the County of Merseyside (2000) married in 2005.

- Baron Beith, of Berwick-upon-Tweed in the County of Northumberland (2015) and
- Baroness Maddock, of Christchurch in the County of Dorset (1997) married in 2001 until Lady Maddock's death in 2020.

- Baron Carlile of Berriew, of Berriew in the County of Powys (1997) and
- Baroness Levitt, of Beachamwell Warren in the County of Norfolk (2025) married in 2007.

- Baron Layard, of Highgate in the London Borough of Haringey (2000) and
- Baroness Meacher, of Spitalfields, in the London Borough of Tower Hamlets (2006) married in 1991.

- Baron Hodgson of Astley Abbotts, of Nash in the County of Shropshire (2000) and
- Baroness Hodgson of Abinger, of Abinger in the County of Surrey (2013) married in 1982.

- Baron Garden, of Hampstead in the London Borough of Camden (2004) and
- Baroness Garden of Frognal, of Hampstead in the London Borough of Camden (2007) married 1965 until Lord Garden's death in 2007.

- Baron Gould of Brookwood, of Brookwood in the County of Surrey (2004) and
- Baroness Rebuck, of Bloomsbury in the London Borough of Camden (2014) married 1985 until Lord Gould of Brookwood's death in 2011.

- Baron Kinnock, of Bedwellty in the County of Gwent (2005) and
- Baroness Kinnock of Holyhead, of Holyhead in the County of Ynys Môn (2009) married in 1967 until Lady Kinnock of Holyhead's death in 2023.

- Baron Bannside, of North Antrim in the County of Antrim (2010) and
- Baroness Paisley of St George's, of St George's in the County of Antrim (2006) married in 1956 until Lord Bannside's death in 2014.

- Baron Wolfson of Aspley Guise, of Aspley Guise in the County of Bedfordshire (2010) and
- Baroness Shawcross-Wolfson, of Aspley Guise in the County of Bedfordshire (2025) married in 2012.

- Baron Kennedy of Southwark, of Newington in the London Borough of Southwark (2010) and
- Baroness Kennedy of Cradley, of Cradley in the Metropolitan Borough of Dudley (2013) married in 20.

== See also ==
The title Baroness Ravensdale of Kedleston, of Kedleston, in the County of Derby (1958) was given to Irene Curzon, 2nd Baroness Ravensdale, of Ravensdale in the County of Derby (1911) to enable her to take a seat in the House of Lords as it was only after the Peerage Act 1963 that suo jure peeresses could sit in the House by virtue of their hereditary peerages. She was the eldest daughter of The Marquess Curzon of Kedleston, and therefore related to not only future Barons Ravensdale, but also the Barons and Viscounts Scarsdale.

Baroness Swanborough, of Swanborough in the County of Sussex (1958), who was the widow of Rufus Isaacs, 1st Marquess of Reading.

Baroness Emmet of Amberley, of Amberley in the County of Sussex (1965), who was the eldest daughter of Rennell Rodd, 1st Baron Rennell.

Baron Beaumont of Whitley, of Child's Hill in Greater London (1967), who was in line to succeed to the Allendale Barony (currently subsidiary to the Viscountcy).

Sir John Cameron, Lord Cameron KT (1900-1996) was a Senator of the College of Justice under the judicial title Lord Cameron from 1955 and his son Kenneth Cameron, Baron Cameron of Lochbroom (1931-2025) was created a life peer on taking office as Lord Advocate in 1984 and thereafter served as a Senator of the College of Justice from 1989.

George Emslie (1919–2002) was appointed to be a Senator of the College of Justice, taking the judicial title Lord Emslie in 1970. He was later made a life peer with the title Baron Emslie, of Potterton in the District of Gordon in 1980. Two of his children followed in his footsteps to be appointed Senators, Derek (b. 1949) took the title Lord Kingarth upon his appointment in 1997, and Nigel (b. 1947) took his father's title, Lord Emslie, upon his appointment in 2001.

Baron Tanlaw, of Tanlawhill in the County of Dumfries (1971), who is in the line of succession to the Earldom of Inchcape.

Baron Charteris of Amisfield, of Amisfield in the District of East Lothian (1978), who was in line to succeed to the Earldoms of Wemyss and March.

Baron Howard of Henderskelfe, of Henderskelfe in the County of North Yorkshire (1983), who was in line to succeed to the Earldom of Carlisle.

Baron Silkin of Dulwich, of North Leigh in the County of Oxfordshire (1985), who was in line to succeed to the Silkin Barony.

Baron Cavendish of Furness, of Cartmel in the County of Cumbria (1990), who is in the line of succession to the Dukedom of Devonshire.

Baron Ridley of Liddesdale, of Willimoteswick in the County of Northumberland (1992), who was in line to succeed to the Ridley Viscountcy

Baron Onslow of Woking, of Woking in the County of Surrey (1997), who was in line to succeed to the Barony of Onslow.

Baron Waldegrave of North Hill, of Chewton Mendip in the County of Somerset (1999), who is in the line of succession to the Earldom of Waldegrave.

Baron Howard of Rising, of Castle Rising in the County of Norfolk (2004), who is in the line of succession to the Earldoms of Suffolk and Berkshire.

Baron Hamilton of Epsom, of West Anstey in the County of Devon (2005), who is in the line of succession to the Barony of Hamilton of Dalzell.

Baroness Chisholm of Owlpen, of Owlpen in the County of Gloucestershire (2014), who is the only daughter of John Wyndham, 6th Baron Leconfield and 1st Baron Egremont.

Baron Bridges of Headley, of Headley Heath in the County of Surrey (2015), who is in the line of succession to the Barony of Bridges.

Baroness Monckton of Dallington Forest, of Earlsdown in the County of East Sussex (2024), who is the only daughter of Gilbert Monckton, 2nd Viscount Monckton of Brenchley.

Lady Arden of Heswall (2018), entitled to be "designated by the courtesy style and title...of "Lady"" by Royal Warrant as a Supreme Court Justice, married Baron Mance, of Frognal in the London Borough of Camden (2005) in 1973, whom she replaced on the Supreme Court when he retired. While explicitly not a life peerage, but a judicial title similar to those held by the Senators of the College of Justice, she would have received a life peerage under the Appellate Jurisdiction Acts had she theoretically been made a Lord of Appeal in Ordinary before the creation of the Supreme Court under the Constitutional Reform Act 2005, as her husband was.
