= Robert Lacey =

British historian and biographer (born 1944)

- Lacey at Surrey County Library's speaking event in 2012
- Born: 3 January 1944 (age 82)
- Education: Selwyn College, Cambridge
- Occupations: Historian; writer
- Spouses: Alexandra Jane Avrach (m. 1970; sep. 2004) Lady Jane Rayne (m. 2012)
- Children: 3
- Writing career
- Genres: History; biography

Robert Lacey (born 3 January 1944) is a British historian and biographer. He is the author of a number of best-selling biographies, including those of Henry Ford, Eileen Ford, Queen Elizabeth II and other royals, as well as several other works of popular history. He is perhaps best known for his work as historical consultant on the Netflix drama The Crown.

== Early life ==
Robert grew up in Bristol and won a scholarship to Bristol Grammar School.

Lacey is an alumnus of Selwyn College, Cambridge, where he earned a BA in History in 1967, a diploma of education in 1967 and an MA in 1970. He began his writing career as a journalist on the Illustrated London News, and later The Sunday Times.

== Career ==
Lacey's 1981 work The Kingdom, about the Saudi royal family and its 2009 follow-up Inside the Kingdom have now both been cited as standard study texts for the diplomatic community working inside the Kingdom of Saudi Arabia. David Brancaccio said: "In Saudi Arabia, Robert Lacey had the kind of access most journalists only dream of."

To research and write the book Lacey took his wife and children to live for two and a half years in Jeddah in the late 1970s. Friends he made there included journalist Jamal Khashoggi. Lacey co-wrote his last three articles before Khashoggi was murdered in 2018.

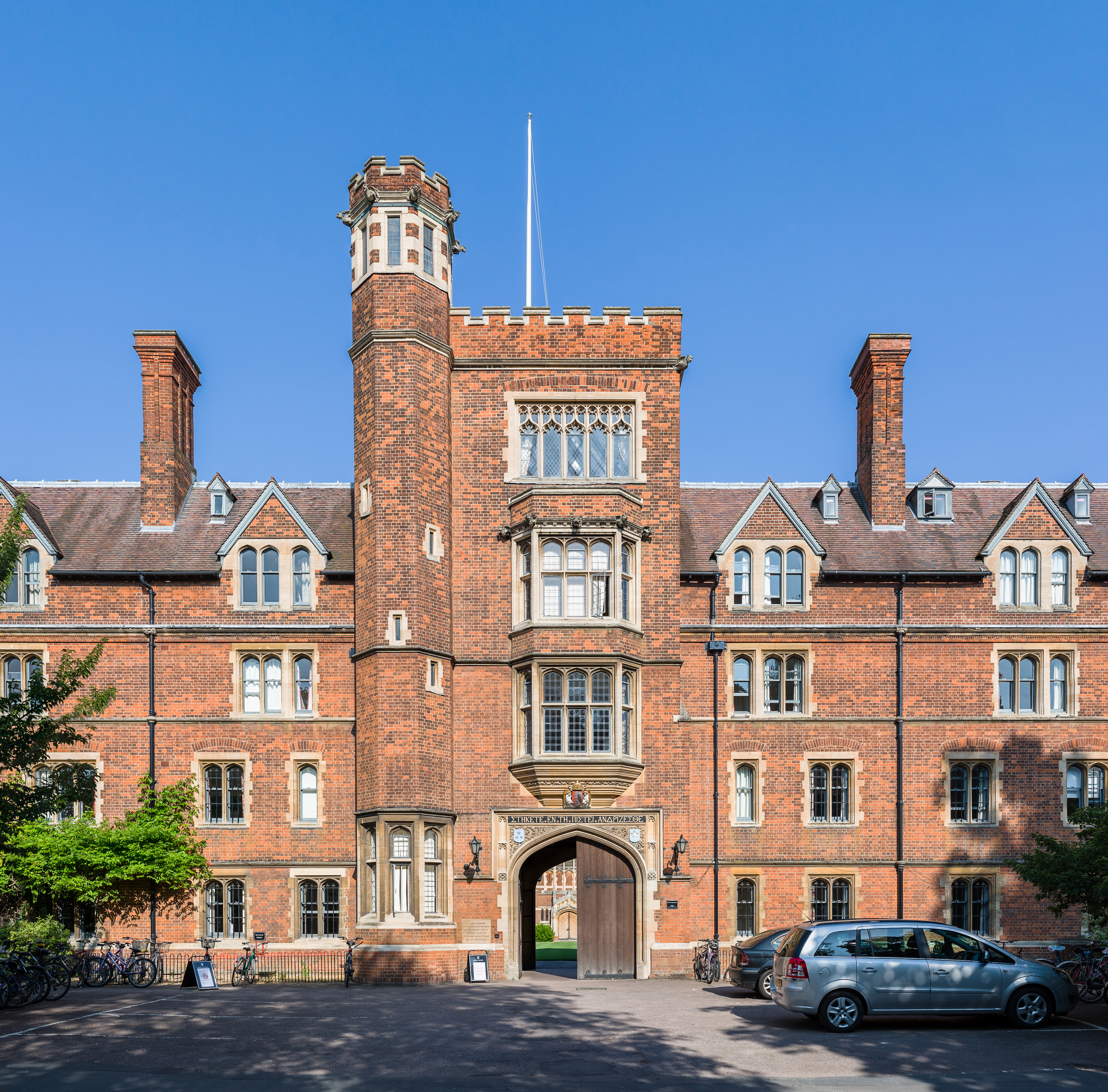
Lacey's Alma Mater Selwyn College, Cambridge

In 2009 Lacey made the controversial documentary Rehab for Terrorists?: Can Terrorists be Rehabilitated with Kindness? for the Now show for the PBS channel and appeared as a commentator on the subject for the channel. Lacey is a royal correspondent, appearing regularly on ABC's Good Morning America, and was in London for the channel covering the wedding of Prince William and Catherine Middleton. Lacey remains active in academia, giving lectures "around the world".

Lacey is the historical consultant to the Netflix series The Crown. The series has been widely criticised in the UK - despite its commercial success - for its historical inaccuracies and artistic inventions; former National Trust chairman and ex-Times editor Simon Jenkins branded it "cowardly...fake history".

Robert Lacey is trustee of Kent Opera, which provides training and development for professional and amateur opera singers and educational and community workshops linked to operas.

During a live BBC broadcast covering the arrival of the coffin of the late Queen Elizabeth II in Edinburgh Lacey spoke of his admiration for John Knox, who he controversially claimed had "cleared the Catholics out of Scotland". Lacey's comments attracted almost 300 complaints and were reported in the national press.

== Family ==
His first marriage, to Alexandra Jane "Sandi" Avrach, ended in 2004 in a legal separation after 34 years. They had three children.

In August 2012 Lacey married Lady Jane Rayne, the daughter of the 8th Marquess of Londonderry and widow of property developer Max Rayne.

== Works ==
- Robert, Earl of Essex: An Elizabethan Icarus (1971) ISBN 9780297003205
- The Life and Times of Henry VIII (1972) ISBN 9781573352475
- The Queens of the North Atlantic (1973) ISBN 9780283979231
- Sir Walter Ralegh (1973) ISBN 9780297765578
- Majesty: Elizabeth II and the House of Windsor (1977) ISBN 9780380018420
- The Kingdom: Arabia & The House of Sa'ud (1981), History of Saudi Arabia to 1979. ISBN 9780151472604
- Princess (1982) with Michael Rand ISBN 9780812910179
- Aristocrats (1983) ISBN 9780316511643
- Ford, the Men and the Machine (1986) ISBN 9780316511667
- God Bless Her! Queen Elizabeth the Queen Mother (1987) ISBN 9780712617031
- Little Man: Meyer Lansky and the Gangster Life (1991) ISBN 9780316511681
- Grace (1994) ISBN 9780399138720
- Sotheby's: Bidding for class (1998) ISBN 9780316511391
- The Queen Mother's Century (1999) with Michael Rand ISBN 9780316511544
- The Year 1000: What Life Was Like at the Turn of the First Millennium (1999, with Danny Danziger) ISBN 9780316511575
- Royal: Her Majesty Queen Elizabeth II (2002) ISBN 9780751532241
- Monarch: Life and Reign of Elizabeth II (2002) ISBN 9780743236690
- Great Tales from English History, Volume 1 (2003) ISBN 9780316109109
- Great Tales from English History, Volume 2 (2005) ISBN 9780316109246
- Great Tales from English History, Volume 3 (2006) ISBN 9780316114592
- Inside the Kingdom Kings, Clerics, Modernists, Terrorists, and the Struggle for Saudi Arabia (2009), History of Saudi Arabia from 1979 to date. ISBN 9780670021185
- A Brief Life of the Queen (2012) ISBN 9781471302190
- Gulf Charities and Islamic Philanthropy in the Age of Terror and Beyond (2014, with Jonathan Benthall) ISBN 9783940924322
- Model Woman: Eileen Ford and the Business of Beauty (2015) ISBN 9780062108074
- The Crown: The official book of the hit Netflix series (2017) ISBN 9781911274988
- The Crown Volume 2: The official book of the hit Netflix series (2019) ISBN 9780525573371
- Battle of Brothers: William, Harry and the Inside Story of a Family in Tumult (2020) ISBN 9780008408510
- Battle of Brothers: William, Harry and the Inside Story of a Family in Tumult - Fully Revised and Updated (2021) ISBN 9780008408510
- Nursery Rhymes With Pictures by Claud Lovat Fraser (2024) ISBN 9781738559503
