= Gordon Wasserman, Baron Wasserman =

British Conservative life peer

The Right Honourable The Lord Wasserman
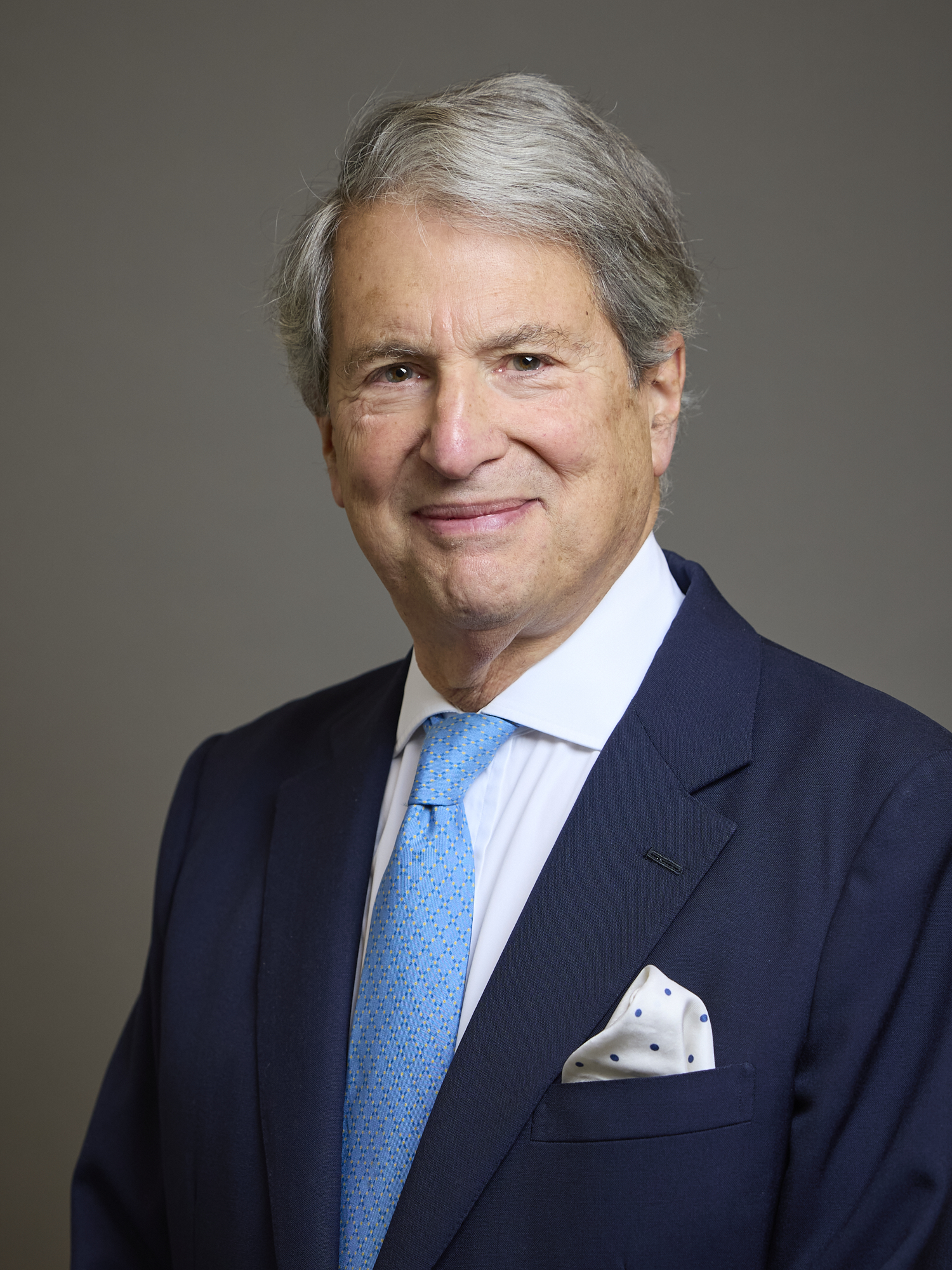
- Official portrait, 2024

Member of the House of Lords
- Lord Temporal
- Life peerage 11 January 2011

Personal details
- Born: 26 July 1938 (age 88) Montreal, Quebec, Canada
- Spouse: The Hon. Cressida Gaitskell (m. 1964; div. 2022)
- Occupation: Politician, political adviser

Gordon Joshua Wasserman, Baron Wasserman (born 26 July 1938) is a member of the British House of Lords who was Government Adviser on Policing and Criminal Justice from 2010 to 2012. Introduced as a Conservative, he became Non-Affiliated in November 2025.

== Career ==
Born in Canada, Wasserman was educated at Westmount High School, McGill University and New College, Oxford on a Rhodes Scholarship. He joined the Home Office as a civil servant in 1967 and worked variously as Economic Adviser, in the Urban Deprivation Unit and as an Assistant Under Secretary of State responsible successively for social policy and policing.

In his subsequent private sector career, Wasserman served as a consultant in public sector and police management, particularly in the use of science and technology in policing. He worked with the Police Commissioners of New York City, Philadelphia and Miami as well as the Department of Justice.

He was created a life peer as Baron Wasserman, of Pimlico in the City of Westminster, on 11 January 2011.

== Personal life ==
Wasserman married in 1964 the Hon. Cressida Gaitskell, younger daughter of Hugh Gaitskell and Dora Gaitskell, Baroness Gaitskell. They have two daughters together. The marriage was dissolved in 2022.

Orders of precedence in the United Kingdom
Preceded by The Lord Marks of Henley-on-Thames	Gentlemen; Baron Wasserman	Followed by The Lord Fellowes of West Stafford
