= Simon Pitkeathley, Baron Pitkeathley of Camden Town =

British businessman (born 1964)

The Right Honourable The Lord Pitkeathley of Camden Town
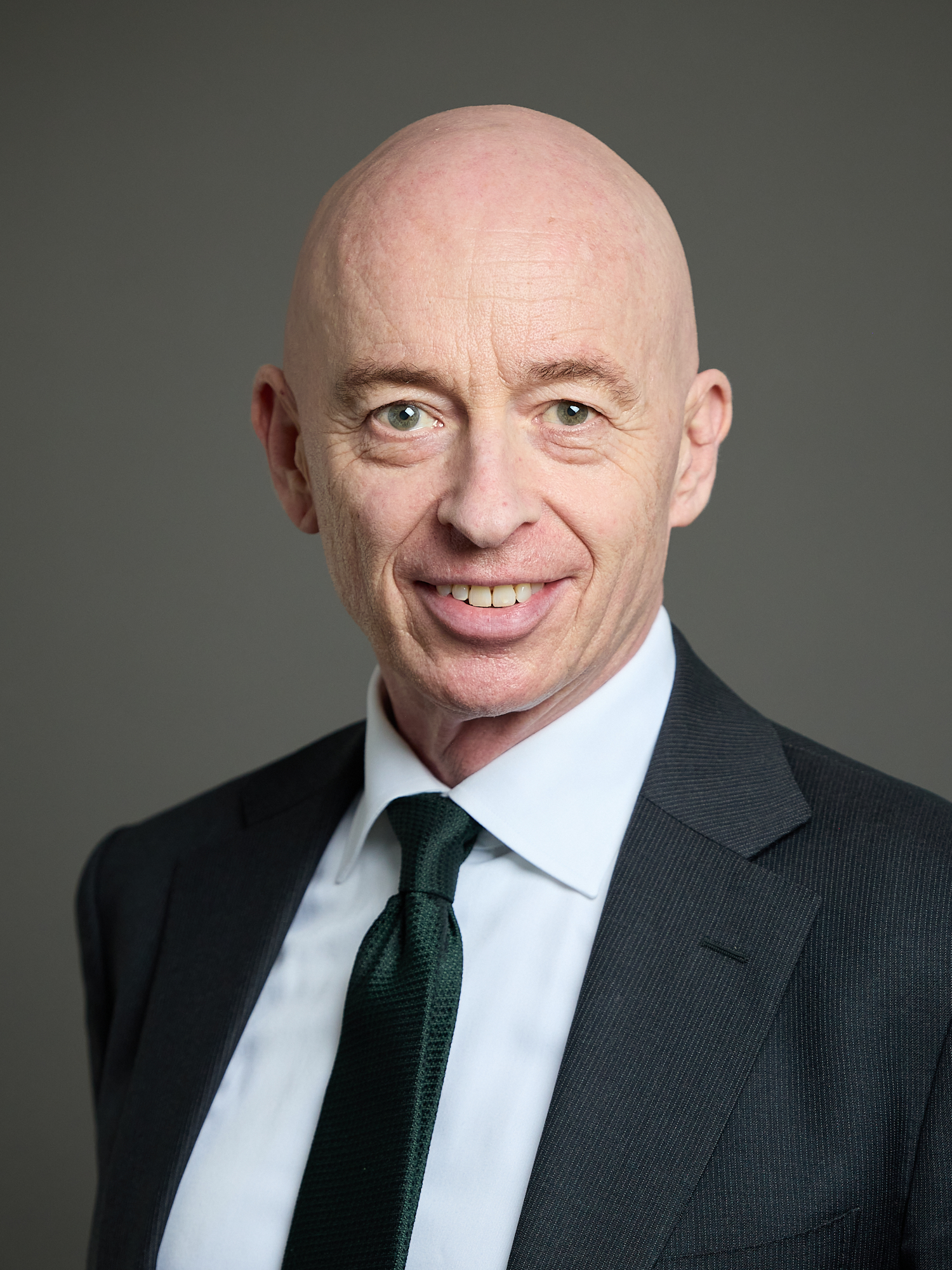
- Official portrait, 2025

Member of the House of Lords
- Lord Temporal
- Life peerage 24 January 2025

Personal details
- Born: Simon William Bisson Pitkeathley; 9 May 1964 (age 62)
- Party: Labour
- Spouse: Miranda Pitcher (m. 1996)
- Children: 2
- Parent: Jill Bisson (mother)
- Occupation: Businessman

Simon William Bisson Pitkeathley, Baron Pitkeathley of Camden Town (born 9 May 1964), is a British businessman and life peer. He has been a member of the House of Lords since 2025.

== Early life and family ==
Simon William Bisson Pitkeathley was born on 9 May 1964 to Thomas Pitkeathley and Jill Pitkeathley (née Bisson). After his parents' divorce in 1978, Pitkeathley was raised with his younger sister Rachel Wilson by their mother.

== Career ==
Pitkeathley became the chief executive of Camden Town Unlimited, a business improvement district (BID) in Camden Town, London, in 2007. He has also been the chief executive of Euston Town, a partner BID of Camden Town Unlimited, as well as Camden Collective, a project supporting start-ups and young entrepreneurs. Pitkeathley was the mayor of London's champion for small business prior to his appointment to the House of Lords.

In 2014, Pitkeathley unsuccessfully sought to be the Labour Party candidate for the constituency of Holborn and St Pancras, a safe Labour seat. Keir Starmer was ultimately selected as the Labour candidate for the seat, succeeding Frank Dobson, who stood down at the 2015 general election.

In late 2024, Pitkeathley was nominated for a Labour Party life peerage by Prime Minister Keir Starmer. He was created Baron Pitkeathley of Camden Town, of Tufnell Park in the London Borough of Islington, on 24 January 2025, and was introduced to the House of Lords on 6 February.

== Personal life ==
Pitkeathley married Miranda Pitcher in 1996, and they have two sons together.
