= Lady Jane Lacey =

British socialite and philanthropist

- Born: Jane Antonia Frances Vane-Tempest-Stewart; 11 August 1932 (age 94); Westminster, London, England
- Other names: Lady Jane Rayne; Jane Rayne, Baroness Rayne
- Known for: Maid of honour at the coronation of Elizabeth II
- Spouses: Max Rayne, Baron Rayne (m. 1965; died 2003) Robert Lacey (m. 2012)
- Children: 4
- Parents: Robin Vane-Tempest-Stewart, 8th Marquess of Londonderry; Romaine Combe

Lady Jane Antonia Frances Lacey (née Vane-Tempest-Stewart, formerly Rayne; born 11 August 1932) is a British socialite and philanthropist.

== Early life ==
She was born on 11 August 1932 in London, England, into an Anglo-Irish noble family with roots in Ulster and County Durham. She is the eldest child of Robin Vane-Tempest-Stewart, 8th Marquess of Londonderry, and his wife Romaine Combe (1904–1951), daughter of Major Boyce Combe. Her two younger siblings were Lady Annabel Goldsmith and Alistair, 9th Marquess of Londonderry.

She was raised on the family estates: Mount Stewart in County Down, Wynyard Park in County Durham, and Londonderry House in Park Lane, London. A painting of her by Edmund Brock appeared on the cover of the February 1939 issue of Woman's Journal.

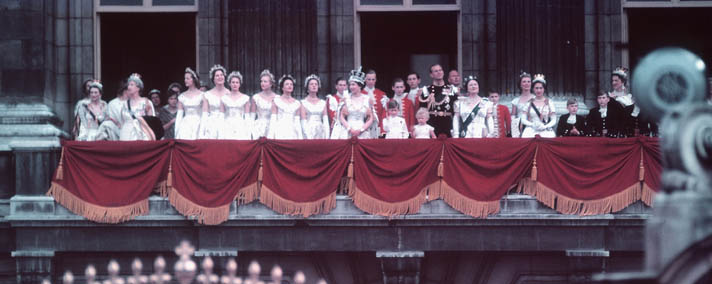
Lady Jane (front row, sixth from left) on the balcony of Buckingham Palace after the coronation of Elizabeth II, 2 June 1953

In 1953, Lady Jane was one of six aristocratic young ladies chosen to serve as maids of honour for the coronation of Elizabeth II at Westminster Abbey. Her duties included carrying the Queen's train during the procession. The maids of honour all wore matching gowns by Norman Hartnell. Lady Jane, along with Lady Rosemary Spencer-Churchill, rode in a carriage with Lord Tryon (the Keeper of the Privy Purse) during the procession while the other maids of honour waited at the abbey.

== Marriages and later life ==
On 2 June 1965, Lady Jane married Anglo-Jewish property developer Max Rayne. They had four children together.

In 1976, Max Rayne was granted a life peerage, after which Lady Jane became known as The Lady Rayne. She was widowed in 2003. In August 2012, she married royal biographer and historian Robert Lacey.

Lady Jane was a founding member and director of Chickenshed, a children's theatre company, and was president of the trustees until her daughter Natasha took over in 2013. She is also patron and trustee of the Rayne Foundation, as well as trustee of the Jerusalem Foundation.
