= Jill Pitkeathley, Baroness Pitkeathley =

British politician (born 1940)

The Right Honourable The Baroness Pitkeathley OBE
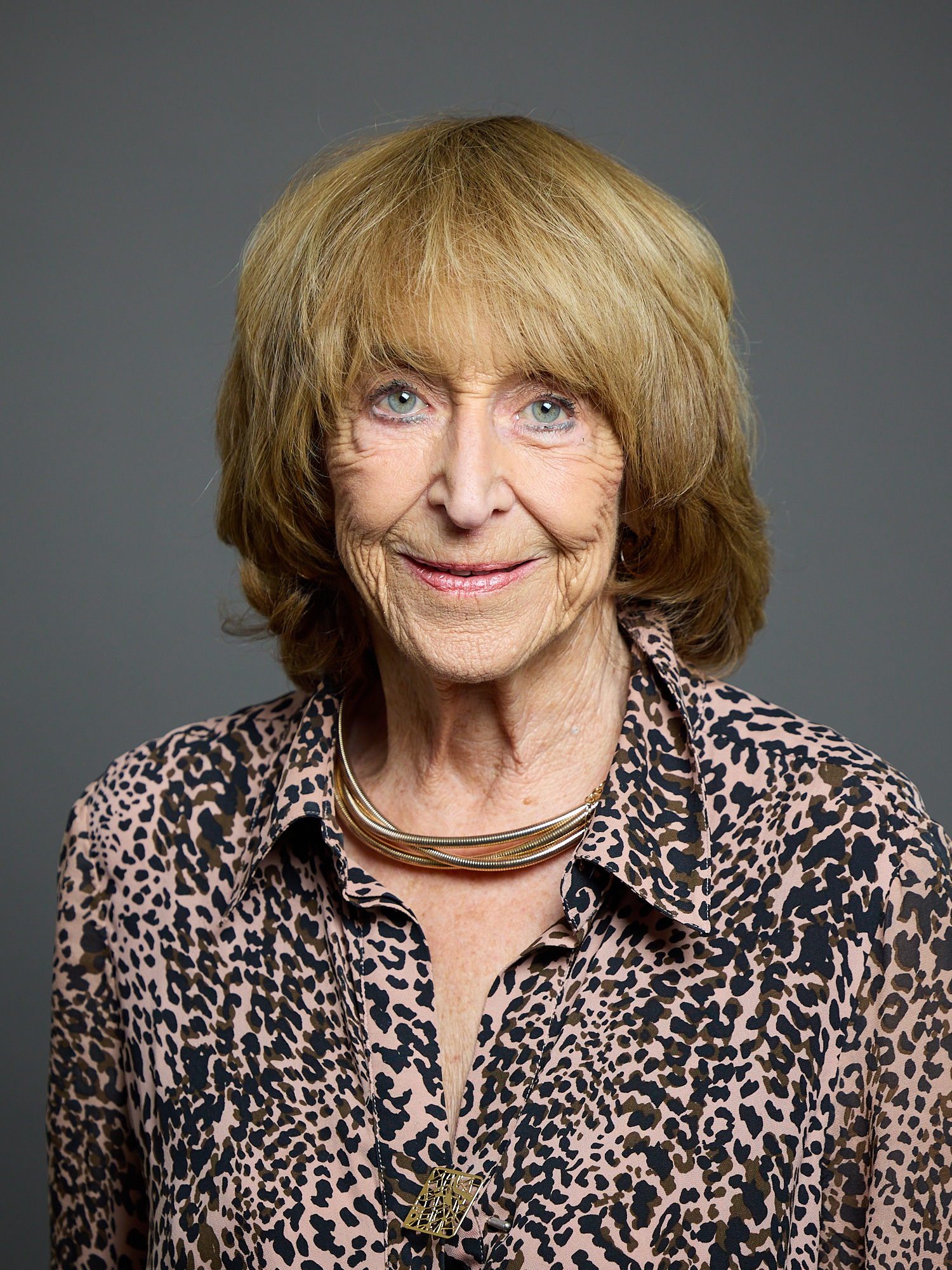
- Official portrait, 2025

Member of the House of Lords
- Lord Temporal
- Life peerage 6 October 1997

Personal details
- Born: 4 January 1940 (age 86) Guernsey
- Party: Labour
- Children: 2, including Simon
- Education: Bristol University
- Occupation: Historian; Politician

Jill Elizabeth Pitkeathley, Baroness Pitkeathley, OBE (née Bisson; born on Guernsey, 4 January 1940) is a British Labour Party member of the House of Lords.

Her first job was working for Manchester City Council as a trainee child care officer in 1961. She was paid £660 a year.

She worked in the voluntary sector, as chief executive of Carers National Association (now renamed Carers UK) for which she was appointed an OBE in the 1993 Birthday Honours. Mrs Pitkeathley was created a life peer as Baroness Pitkeathley, of Caversham in the Royal County of Berkshire, on 6 October 1997. Since 1998 she has been chair of one of the lottery distributors, the New Opportunities Fund. In 2004, she was appointed chair of the Children and Family Court Advisory and Support Service (CAFCASS). Lady Pitkeathley also chaired the Office for Civil Society Advisory Body until its abolition in March 2011.

Pitkeathley was a founding member of ACEVO, the Association of Chief Executives of Voluntary Organisations. She is a trustee of Cumberland Lodge.
