= Life Peerages Act 1958 =

Act of the Parliament of the United Kingdom

Life Peerages Act 1958 (Note: Section 2.)
- Act of Parliament
- Parliament of the United Kingdom
- Long title: An Act to make provision for the creation of life peerages carrying the right to sit and vote in the House of Lords.
- Citation: 6 & 7 Eliz. 2. c. 21
- Territorial extent: United Kingdom

Dates
- Royal assent: 30 April 1958
- Commencement: 30 April 1958 (Note: The Acts of Parliament (Commencement) Act 1793.)
Other legislation
Amended by	Constitutional Reform Act 2005
Relates to	Appellate Jurisdiction Act 1876; Peerage Act 1963; House of Lords Act 1999

Status: Amended

Text of statute as originally enacted

Revised text of statute as amended

Text of the Life Peerages Act 1958 as in force today (including any amendments) within the United Kingdom, from legislation.gov.uk.

The Life Peerages Act 1958 (6 & 7 Eliz. 2. c. 21) is an act of the Parliament of the United Kingdom that established the modern standards for the creation of life peers by the Sovereign of the United Kingdom.

== Background ==
This act was passed during the Conservative governments of 1957–1964, when Harold Macmillan was Prime Minister. Elizabeth II had ascended to the throne just over five years before the act. The Conservatives tried to introduce life peerages to modernise the House of Lords, give it more legitimacy, and respond to a decline in its numbers and attendance.

=== Passage ===
The Life Peerages Bill was introduced into the House of Lords on 21 November 1957, and its second reading took place on 3 and 5 December 1957. Committee stage was taken on 17 and 18 December 1957. The bill was reported without amendment and given a third reading on 30 January 1958.

In the Commons, the second reading took place on 12 and 13 February 1958. The second reading debate was lengthy; the first day of second reading saw 21 speeches and 29 interruptions, while the second day contained 18 speeches, with 46 interruptions. The Labour Party opposed the Life Peerages Bill on Second Reading: Hugh Gaitskell made an impassioned speech against the proposals, arguing for a far more fundamental reform such as total dismantling of the Lords or a wholly elected house. At the end of the debate, an opposition amendment declining a second reading to the bill was defeated by 305 votes to 251. The bill was given a third reading on 2 April 1958 by 292 votes to 241 and received royal assent on 30 April 1958. The first batch of 14 life peers was announced on 24 July 1958.

== Summary ==
Prior to the Life Peerages Act 1958, membership in the House of Lords was strictly male and overwhelmingly based on possession of a hereditary title. There existed a few exceptions to the hereditary principle, such as for the Lords Spiritual. The act made it possible for life peers of both sexes to be members of the Lords. Life peers are either barons (a title in existence since the Middle Ages; holders are usually known as Lord for all but the most formal documents) or baronesses (where female; conventionally they choose to be known as "Lady X" or "Baroness X" as preferred) and are members of the House of Lords for life, but their titles and membership in the House of Lords cannot be inherited by their children. Judicial life peers already sat in the House under the terms of the Appellate Jurisdiction Act 1876. The Life Peerages Act greatly increased the ability of prime ministers to change the composition of the House of Lords by permitting the creation of groups of life peers rather than hereditary peerages. This gradually diminished the numerical dominance of hereditary peers.

The act allowed for the creation of female peers entitled to sit in the House of Lords. The first four such women peers were: Barbara Wootton and Stella Isaacs, who were sworn in on 21 October 1958, and Katharine Elliot and Irene Curzon, who took office the next day.

A life peer is created by the sovereign by letters patent under the Great Seal on the advice of the Prime Minister.

Before the act was enacted, former prime ministers were usually created hereditary viscounts or earls in recognition of their public service in high office, as were the Viceroys of India and exceptional military or front bench figures, for example the former Secretary of State for India and earlier for Air, Viscount Stansgate, and retired Speakers of the House of Commons. The last prime minister and the last non-royal to be created an earl was coincidentally one of the 1958 act's proponents, Harold Macmillan, on Margaret Thatcher's advice, in the 1980s. Since her time, only members of the Royal Family have been granted new hereditary peerages. In 2023, Prince Edward, already hereditary Earl of Wessex and Forfar, was made Duke of Edinburgh for life, though not under the act.

== Historic approval and 1999 adjustment of House composition ==
In 1999, during the debate which secured the removal of the constitutional functions of most hereditary peers, the Minister for Constitutional Affairs, Geoff Hoon stated:

The difference is, of course, that the Labour party lost the argument in 1958. The reform provided by the Life Peerages Act 1958 was a successful single-stage reform of the operation of the second Chamber. History has proved that the Labour party was wrong and Conservative Ministers were right in 1958.

After this agreed with a question from fellow Labour MP, Mark Fisher which stated:

The White Paper—and all that I have heard from my right hon. Friend the President of the Council and Leader of the House of Commons—gave an absolute and clear commitment to a second stage [of Lords Reform], presaged by the Royal Commission

== Subsequent developments ==
The act remains in force. The words "Without prejudice to Her Majesty's powers as to the appointment of Lords of Appeal in Ordinary," at the start of section 1(1) were repealed by section 146 of, and part 5 of schedule 18 to, the Constitutional Reform Act 2005 (c. 4), which came into force on 1 October 2009 under the Constitutional Reform Act 2005 (Commencement No. 11) Order 2009 (SI 2009/1604).

== See also ==
- Life peer
- Peerages in the United Kingdom
- Parliament Act 1911
- Peerage Act 1963 – act that permitted disclaimer (renunciation, unless later claimed) of peerages
  - For example, (14th) Earl of Home (before and after Alec Douglas-Home) or (2nd) Viscount Stansgate (before and after Tony Benn).
- House of Lords Act 1999 – act that restricted the right of hereditary peers to sit in the House of Lords to only 92, elected among all hereditary peers
- Hereditary Peers Act 2026 – act that ended all hereditary peerages in the House of Lords
- List of related life peers
