= Office for Civil Society Advisory Body =

The Office for Civil Society Advisory Body (formerly known as the Office of the Third Sector Advisory Body or sometimes the Third Sector Advisory Body) was a quasi-autonomous non-governmental organisation (quango) (officially termed a non-departmental public body) set up by the Government of the United Kingdom in July 2008, which advised the government on the needs of charities and voluntary organisations in the United Kingdom, and to implement the July 2007 review by HM Treasury and the Cabinet Office ("The future role of the third sector in social and economic regeneration"). The body was formed as a result of the merger of four previous advisory structures: the Voluntary and Community Sector Advisory Group, Futurebuilders Advisory Panel, Infrastructure National Partnership and the Third Sector Review Advisory Group, was chaired by Baroness Jill Pitkeathley OBE, and was part of the Cabinet Office's Office of Civil Society (formerly the Office of the Third Sector or OTS).

In April 2009, the body published a 'health check' of the Office of the Third Sector (to which the OTS later responded) resulting in a set of twelve confirmed recommendations to ensure the effectiveness of the Office of the Third Sector. Following the rename of the Office of the Third Sector to the Office for Civil Society, the advisory body also changed its name to the Office for Civil Society Advisory Body. The body was listed as one of the quangos to be abolished during the 2010 quango reforms, the advisory body being abolished once the members' terms of offices had expired on 31 March 2011, resulting in public savings of £0.04 million. Lamenting the closure, chair of the board Baroness Pitkeathley said:

Our time has run out...And with the way things are going, I wouldn't have expected anything else. I hope the government will use other sources of advice from across the sector.

— Baroness Pitkeathley OBE
