= Max Rayne =

British property developer and philanthropist

The Right Honourable The Lord Rayne

Member of the House of Lords
- Lord Temporal
- Life peerage 2 August 1976 – 10 October 2003

Personal details
- Born: 8 February 1918
- Died: 10 October 2003 (aged 85)

Max Rayne, Baron Rayne (8 February 1918 – 10 October 2003) was a British property developer and philanthropist who supported medical, religious, education and arts charities in England.

== Early life ==
Rayne came from a Jewish family. His father, Phillip, was a garment manufacturer living in the East End of London. It was a modest but cultured home – his grandfather had been a Hebrew scholar and teacher and his father had a lively interest in music, opera and conversation. Max was educated at the nearby religious, but non-denominational, Central Foundation Boys' School, Bow. Max studied psychology and accountancy and took a night school course in law at University College, London (which later gave him an honorary doctorate). After service with the RAF in the Second World War Rayne rejoined the family clothing firm. Using sub-leases on its premises as his source of finance, he directed his attention to land and property development in bomb-damaged central London.

== Family ==
In 1941, Rayne married Margaret Marco and they had three children:

- Madeleine Barbara (b. 1943)
- Susan Ann (b. 1945)
- Robert Anthony (b. 1949)

Rayne and his wife divorced in 1960 and on 2 June 1965, he married Lady Jane Vane-Tempest-Stewart (a daughter of the 8th Marquess of Londonderry and sister of Lady Annabel Goldsmith) and they had four children:

- Natasha Deborah (b. 1966)
- Nicholas Alexander (b. 1969)
- Tamara Annabel (b. 1970)
- Alexander Philip (b. 1973)

== Rayne Foundation ==
As Rayne had judged, the opportunities offered in the post-war period of booming reconstruction led to substantial business success and when, in 1962, he set up the Rayne Foundation and endowed it with a substantial shareholding in his companies, he created a well funded and influential charitable institution.

Although acting through the foundation, Rayne took a close personal interest in the causes it supported. He was soon on the governing bodies of most of the London teaching hospitals, where his business skills were highly valued, and prominent Jewish charities. In 1964 Darwin College, Cambridge, was founded with support from the Rayne Foundation and a personal donation from Rayne himself, and this is acknowledged by the college in two ways: Firstly, on the college's coat of arms, which impales Rayne's coat of arms alongside that of the Darwin family. Secondly, the central building to the college is named the Rayne Building. He also supported music, ballet, painting and the theatre. He was chairman of the board of the National Theatre from 1971 until 1988 and so oversaw its move from the Old Vic to the present building in 1976.

Rayne was knighted in 1969 and made a life peer as Baron Rayne, of Prince's Meadow in Greater London, on 2 August 1976. He was also created a Chevalier of the Légion d'Honneur in 1973, later promoted to Officier.

In 2007, using money from the Rayne Foundation, the Hand in Hand School, a bilingual school located in Jerusalem was founded to teach Arabs and Jews alongside each other.

== Arms ==
Coat of arms of Max Rayne
Crest Upon a wreath Or and Azure issuant from a circlet Or a mount Vert thereon a lion passant Gold murally crowned Azure holding in the dexter forepaw a key erect wards outwards Or. Escutcheon Per fess dancetty Azure and Gules a caduceus between in chief two roses Or. Supporters Dexter a lion Or crowned and gorged with a chain pendant therefrom two triangles interlaced Azure sinister a lion Azure crowned and gorged with a like chain pendant therefrom a fleur-de-lys Gold. Motto Integrity Enterprise

== Sources ==
- Barker, Nicholas (12 October 2003). "Obituary: Lord Rayne". The Independent.
- "Obituary: Lord Rayne". The Daily Telegraph. London. 11 October 2003.
- "Obituary: Lord Rayne". The Times. London. 11 October 2003.
- Cowe, Roger (12 October 2003). "Obituary: Lord Rayne". The Guardian. London.
- Who Was Who. London: A and C Black. 2006. ISBN 0-7136-7601-9.
