= Dora Gaitskell, Baroness Gaitskell =

Labour Party politician and life peer

The Right Honourable The Baroness Gaitskell

Member of the House of Lords Lord Temporal
- In office 23 January 1964 – 1 July 1989; Life Peerage

Personal details
- Born: Anna Dora Creditor; 25 April 1901 Latvia, Russian Empire
- Died: 1 July 1989 (aged 88) London, England
- Party: Labour
- Spouses: Isaac Frost (m. 1921; div. 1937) Hugh Gaitskell (m. 1937; died 1963)
- Children: 3

Anna Dora Gaitskell, Baroness Gaitskell (née Creditor; formerly Frost; 25 April 1901 – 1 July 1989) was a British Labour Party politician and the wife of Hugh Gaitskell, who led the Labour Party from 1955 until his death in 1963.

== Early life ==
She was born Anna Dora Creditor near Riga, Latvia, then part of Russia, the eldest of four sisters and a brother. Her father, Leon Creditor was a Hebrew scholar and writer. They emigrated to Britain in 1903 or soon after, arriving in Stepney, London. She was educated at Coborn High School for Girls in Bow, east London. She abandoned a career in medicine to marry Isaac Frost, a lecturer in physiology, on 15 March 1921. They had a son, Raymond, in 1925, but divorced in 1937.

== Political career ==
She had joined the Labour Party at the age of 16. She met Hugh Gaitskell in Fitzrovia, London. Gaitskell had taken a teaching post at University College London. They married at Hampstead Town Hall on 9 April 1937. They had two daughters Julia, 1939, and Cressida, 1942.

She was a delegate at the UN General Assembly and member of the All Party Committee for Human Rights from 1977 to 1989. She was also Trustee of the Anglo-German Federation. She remained loyal to the Labour Party when most of her husband's supporters left to form the Social Democratic Party in 1981.

On 23 January 1964, she was made a life peer with the title Baroness Gaitskell, of Egremont in the County of Cumberland. Two years later she received an honorary degree as Doctor of Law from the University of Leeds.

She outlived Hugh Gaitskell by 26 years after his death in January 1963, living until July 1989 and the age of 88. She died at the Gaitskell home, 18 Frognal Gardens, Hampstead.
