= Life peer =

Appointed member of the peerage of the United Kingdom whose title cannot be inherited

In the United Kingdom, life peers are appointed members of the peerage whose titles cannot be inherited, in contrast to hereditary peers. Life peers are appointed by the monarch on the advice of the prime minister. With the exception of the Dukedom of Edinburgh, awarded for life to Prince Edward in 2023, all life peerages conferred since 2009 have been created under the Life Peerages Act 1958 with the rank of baron. Such peerages entitle (or perhaps obligate) the holder to sit and vote in the House of Lords (so long as they meet qualifications such as age and citizenship). Prior to 2009, life peers of baronial rank could also be created under the Appellate Jurisdiction Act 1876 for senior judges, referred to as Law Lords; after that date, judicial functions of the House of Lords were taken over by the new Supreme Court.

The legitimate children of a life peer appointed under the Life Peerages Act 1958 are entitled to style themselves with the prefix "The Honourable", although they cannot inherit the peerage.

== Before 1887 ==
The Crown, as fount of honour, creates peerages of two types: hereditary, or for life. In the early days of the peerage, the sovereign had the right to summon individuals to one Parliament without being bound to summon them again. Over time, it was established that once summoned, a peer would have to be summoned for the remainder of their life, and later, that the peer's heirs and successors would also be summoned, thereby firmly entrenching the hereditary principle.

Nevertheless, life peerages lingered. From the reign of James I to that of George II (between 1603 and 1760), 18 life peerages were created for women. Women, however, were excluded from sitting in the House of Lords, so it was unclear whether or not a life peerage would entitle a man to do the same. For over four centuries—if one excludes those who sat in Cromwell's House of Lords (or Other House) during the Interregnum—no man had claimed a seat in the Lords by virtue of a life peerage. In 1856, it was thought necessary to add a peer learned in law to the House of Lords (which was the final court of appeal), without allowing the peer's heirs to sit in the House and swell its numbers. Sir James Parke, a Baron (judge) of the Exchequer, was created Baron Wensleydale for life, but the House of Lords concluded that the peerage did not entitle him to sit in the House of Lords. Lord Wensleydale was therefore appointed a hereditary peer (in any case, he had no sons, so his peerage did not pass to an heir) (See also Wensleydale Peerage Case (1856)).

The Government introduced a bill to authorise the creation of two life peerages carrying seats in the House of Lords for judges who had held office for at least five years. The House of Lords passed it, but the bill was lost in the House of Commons.

In 1869, a more comprehensive life peerages bill was brought forward by the Earl Russell. At any one time, 28 life peerages could be in existence; no more than four were to be created in any one year. Life peers were to be chosen from senior judges, civil servants, senior officers of the British Army or Royal Navy, members of the House of Commons who had served for at least ten years, scientists, writers, artists, peers of Scotland, and peers of Ireland. (Peers of Scotland and Ireland did not all have seats in the House of Lords, instead electing a number of representative peers.) The bill was rejected by the House of Lords at its third reading.

The Appellate Jurisdiction Act 1876 permitted the creation of life peerages with the rank of baron for senior judges in the House of Lords. Initially it was intended that the Lords of Appeal in Ordinary created in this way (for their titles, see the list of law life peerages) would only sit in the House of Lords while serving their term as judges, but in 1887 (on the retirement of Lord Blackburn, the first person appointed under the Appellate Jurisdiction Act 1876) the Appellate Jurisdiction Act 1887 provided that former judges would retain their seats for life. The practice of appointing life peers under the Appellate Jurisdiction Act 1876 ended with the creation of the Supreme Court of the United Kingdom in 2009. Sitting judges of the Supreme Court are not automatically given life peerages but are entitled to use the judicial courtesy title of "Lord" or "Lady" for life.

== Life Peerages Act 1958 ==
The Life Peerages Act sanctions the regular granting of life peerages, but the power to appoint Lords of Appeal in Ordinary under the Appellate Jurisdiction Act was not derogated. The Act placed no limits on the number of peerages that the sovereign may award, as was done by the Appellate Jurisdiction Act. A peer created under the Life Peerages Act has the right to sit in the House of Lords, provided that they are at least 21 years of age, are not suffering punishment upon conviction for treason, and are a citizen of the United Kingdom, of a member of the Commonwealth of Nations or of the Republic of Ireland, and are resident in the UK for tax purposes.

Life baronies under the Life Peerages Act are created by the sovereign but, in practice, are only granted when proposed by the Prime Minister.

Life peers created under the Life Peerages Act do not, unless they also hold ministerial positions, receive salaries. They are, however, entitled to an allowance of £371 for travel and accommodation for each day on which the peer "signs in" to the House, though the peer does not have to take part in the business of the House.

=== "Working peers" ===
From time to time, lists of "working peers" are published. They do not form a formal class, but represent the various political parties and are expected to regularly attend the House of Lords. Most new appointments of life peers fall into this category.

Normally, the Prime Minister chooses only peers from their own party, but permits the leaders of opposition parties to recommend peers from their parties. The Prime Minister may determine the number of peers each party may propose; they may also choose to amend these recommendations, but by convention do not do so.

=== "People's peers" ===
Peers may be created on a non-partisan basis. Formerly, nominations on merit alone were made by the prime minister, but this function was partially transferred to a new, non-statutory House of Lords Appointments Commission in 2000. Individuals recommended for the peerage by the commission go on to become what have been described by some in the British media as "people's peers". The commission also scrutinises party recommendations for working peerages to ensure propriety. The prime minister may determine the number of peers the commission may propose, and also may amend the recommendations. Again, by convention, no amendment is made to the recommendations of the commission.

=== Honours ===
Individuals may be created peers in various honours lists as rewards for achievement; these peers are not expected to attend the House of Lords regularly, but are at liberty to do so if they please. The New Year Honours List, the King's Birthday Honours List (to mark the sovereign's official birthday, the third Saturday in June), the Dissolution Honours List (to mark the dissolution of Parliament) and the Resignation Honours List (to mark the end of a Prime Minister's tenure) are all used to announce life peerage creations.

=== Public offices ===
Creations may be made for individuals on retirement from important public offices, such as prime minister, Speaker of the House of Commons or Archbishop of Canterbury or York.

Sir Alec Douglas-Home, who had renounced his hereditary title of the 14th Earl of Home on becoming prime minister, was the first former occupant of the office to receive a life barony. Harold Wilson, James Callaghan and Margaret Thatcher all took life peerages following their retirement from the House of Commons. David Cameron took a life peerage upon his appointment as foreign secretary under Rishi Sunak. Theresa May was granted a life peerage in the 2024 Dissolution Honours. Edward Heath and John Major chose not to become peers. Tony Blair, Gordon Brown, Boris Johnson, Liz Truss, and Keir Starmer have yet to receive a peerage. As of August 2026, Rishi Sunak is still serving as an MP.

Harold Macmillan declined a peerage on leaving office, but over 20 years after retiring he accepted a second offer of the customary hereditary earldom for retiring prime ministers, as Earl of Stockton (1984); this was the last earldom to be offered outside the royal family. While David Lloyd George also waited a similar period for his earldom, most offers have been made and accepted shortly after retirement such as the Earls of Oxford and Asquith, Baldwin, Attlee and Avon.

Many Cabinet members, including Chancellors of the Exchequer, Foreign Secretaries, Home Secretaries and Defence Secretaries, retiring since 1958 have generally been created life peers. William Whitelaw was created a hereditary viscount on the recommendation of Margaret Thatcher. Viscount Whitelaw died without male issue.

Life peerages have generally been granted to Speakers of the House of Commons upon retirement since 1971, who sit as crossbenchers. (Previously, retiring Speakers had by custom received a hereditary peerage between 1780 and 1970, usually a viscountcy.) George Thomas was the only Speaker after 1971 who still received a hereditary peerage instead of a life peerage, being created Viscount Tonypandy, but he died without male issue. The convention was broken in 2020 when retiring Speaker John Bercow was not granted a life peerage, the first denial of a peerage to a former Speaker in over 200 years. At the time, Bercow was under investigation by the Parliamentary Commissioner for Standards regarding allegations of bullying, with the government claiming that Bercow would fail a "propriety test" conducted for all nominees. Unusually, Bercow was nominated for a peerage by then-Leader of the Opposition and Labour leader Jeremy Corbyn.

The Prime Minister continues to recommend a small number of former public office-holders for peerages. This generally includes Chiefs of Defence Staff, Secretaries of the Cabinet, and Heads of the Diplomatic Service. Every Archbishop of Canterbury who has retired since 1958 has been created a life peer, as have most recent Archbishops of York on retirement. A small number of other bishops—such as David Sheppard of Liverpool and Richard Harries of Oxford—were ennobled on retiring. The Lord Chamberlain is traditionally a member of the House of Lords and so is ennobled on appointment (if not already a peer), while most retiring Private Secretaries to the Sovereign and Governors of the Bank of England have also become peers.

High judicial officers have sometimes been created life peers upon taking office. All Lord Chief Justices of England and Wales have, since 1958, been created life peers under the Life Peerages Act, with the exception of Lord Woolf, who was already a Lord of Appeal in Ordinary before becoming Lord Chief Justice. Similarly, Lord Reed was created a life peer in 2019 when he was appointed President of the Supreme Court, all of his predecessors in that role having already been created life peers as former Lords of Appeal in Ordinary.

Life peerages may in certain cases be awarded to hereditary peers. After the House of Lords Act 1999 passed, several hereditary peers of the first creation, who had not inherited their titles but would still be excluded from the House of Lords by the Act, were created life peers: Toby Low, 1st Baron Aldington; Frederick James Erroll, 1st Baron Erroll of Hale; Frank Pakenham, 7th Earl of Longford and 1st Baron Pakenham; and Antony Armstrong-Jones, 1st Earl of Snowdon. None of the peers of the first creation who were members of the royal family was granted a life peerage, as they had all declined. Life peerages were also granted to former Leaders of the House of Lords, including John Julian Ganzoni, 2nd Baron Belstead; Peter Carington, 6th Baron Carrington; Robert Gascoyne-Cecil, 7th Marquess of Salisbury (better known as Viscount Cranborne and Lord Cecil of Essendon, having attended the Lords by virtue of a writ of acceleration); George Jellicoe, 2nd Earl Jellicoe; Malcolm Shepherd, 2nd Baron Shepherd; and David Hennessy, 3rd Baron Windlesham.

As part of the celebrations to mark the fiftieth anniversary of the Life Peerages Act, Gareth Williams, Baron Williams of Mostyn was voted by the members of the House of Lords at the time as the outstanding life peer since the creation of the life peerage.

== Number of life peers ==
Peers created under the Life Peerages Act 1958
Prime Minister	Party	Tenure	No. of peers
Harold Macmillan	Conservative	1957–1963	46
Alec Douglas-Home	Conservative	1963–1964	16
Harold Wilson	Labour	1964–1970	122
Edward Heath	Conservative	1970–1974	58
Harold Wilson	Labour	1974–1976	80
James Callaghan	Labour	1976–1979	58
Margaret Thatcher	Conservative	1979–1990	201
John Major	Conservative	1990–1997	160
Tony Blair	Labour	1997–2007	357
Gordon Brown	Labour	2007–2010	34
David Cameron	Conservative	2010–2016	243
Theresa May	Conservative	2016–2019	43
Boris Johnson	Conservative	2019–2022	87
Liz Truss	Conservative	2022	3
Rishi Sunak	Conservative	2022–2024	58
Keir Starmer	Labour	2024–2026	113
Andy Burnham	Labour	2026–present	28
Total			1707
Life peerages conferred on hereditary peers (from 1999 onwards) are not included in the numbers.

As of 31 October 2026, there are 771 life peers eligible to vote in the House of Lords. This includes 247 Conservative, 232 Labour, 79 Liberal Democrat, and 154 crossbench peers. There are also 13 others representing 4 other parties, 44 non-affiliated, 1 labelling themselves as "independent" but close to a party, and the Lord Speaker. There are currently 19 life peers who are members but ineligible to sit, either because of temporary suspension, a requested leave of absence, or holding of certain judicial offices.

In addition, there are about 70 life peers who have retired from the House of Lords since 2010, as well as several who have been removed for non-attendance.

The Appellate Jurisdiction Act originally provided for the appointment of two Lords of Appeal in Ordinary, who would continue to serve while holding judicial office, though in 1887, they were permitted to continue to sit in the House of Lords for life, under the style and dignity of baron. The number of Lords of Appeal in Ordinary was increased from time to time – to three in 1882, to four in 1891, to six in 1913, to seven in 1919, to nine in 1947, to 11 in 1968 and to 12 in 1994. These provisions were repealed by the Constitutional Reform Act 2005 which created the Supreme Court of the United Kingdom. That Act also provided that holders of judicial offices, including Justice of the Supreme Court, who are for that reason disqualified from the House of Commons or the Northern Ireland Assembly, are now also disqualified from taking up their seats in the House of Lords if they are peers (as the former Law Lords all were).

The rate of creation of life peerages under the Life Peerages Act fluctuated over time, with a high rate being most common right after there is a change in the party of government (ie, an opposition party wins an election). Thus, Keir Starmer, David Cameron and Tony Blair have created life peerages at high rates, at 56.5, 40.5 and 35.7 peerages per year respectively.

Conservative Prime Ministers have created on average 21 life peers per year in office, Labour Prime Ministers an average of 27 per year. In absolute terms, the Conservatives (in 40 years) have created slightly more (853 out of 1504, as of June 2022) life peerages than Labour (651 in 24 years); in addition, the vast majority (61) of the 68 non-royal hereditary peerages created since 1958 were created under Conservative Prime Ministers (especially Macmillan). Only three non-royal hereditary peerages have been created since 1965 (all under Thatcher), and none since 1984.

In 1999, there were 172 Conservative and 160 Labour life peers in the House of Lords, and by 4 January 2010, there were 141 Conservative and 207 Labour life peers in the House of Lords. The hereditary element of the House of Lords, however, was much less balanced. In 1999, for example, immediately before most hereditary peers were removed by the House of Lords Act, there were 350 Conservative hereditary peers, compared with 19 Labour peers and 23 Liberal Democrat peers. In 2026, all hereditary peers were removed from the house by virtue of the House of Lords (Hereditary Peers) Act 2026.

== Disclaiming ==
The Peerage Act 1963 allows the holder of a hereditary peerage to disclaim their title for life. There is no such provision for life peers. The Coalition Government's draft proposal for Lords reform in 2011 provided "that a person who holds a life peerage may at any time disclaim that peerage by writing to the Lord Chancellor. The person [and their spouse and children] will be divested of all rights and interests attaching to [that] peerage." This proposal did not become law. In 2014 under the House of Lords Reform Act it became possible for peers to resign from the House of Lords and the next year's House of Lords (Expulsion and Suspension) Act authorised the Lords to expel a peer (both without disclaiming the peerage).

== Titles and forms of address ==
Most barons or baronesses for life take a title based on their surname, either alone (e.g. Baron Hattersley) or in combination with a placename (known as a territorial designation) to differentiate them from others of the same surname (e.g. Baroness Kennedy of The Shaws). Surnames need not be used at all, if desired; Tony Banks, for example, opted for the title Lord Stratford. There are also occasions when someone's surname is not appropriate as a title, such as Michael Lord (now Lord Framlingham) and Michael Bishop (now Lord Glendonbrook).

The formal style for a life peer is as follows (John Smith and Mary Smith stand in for any name; London to any territorial designation):

- In the case of a life baron: The Rt Hon The Lord Smith (of London) (e.g. The Rt Hon The Lord Owen)
  or The Rt Hon John, Lord Smith (of London) (e.g. The Rt Hon David, Lord Steel of Aikwood)
- In the case of a life baroness: The Rt Hon The Baroness Smith (of London) (e.g. The Rt Hon The Baroness Thatcher)
  or The Rt Hon Mary, Baroness Smith (of London) (e.g. The Rt Hon Betty, Baroness Boothroyd) (Note: His Majesty's Passport Office use the form of "The Baroness (of) X" for a baroness in her own right, and the form of "The Lady (of) X" for a baron's wife.)

Life peers are often mistakenly called 'Lord' or 'Lady' before their names (e.g. "Lord Andrew Lloyd-Webber") following their ennoblement, but this is incorrect since the correct form should be one of those shown above. Only the daughters of earls, marquesses and dukes (and women members of the Orders of the Garter and the Thistle), and the younger sons of marquesses and dukes are properly referred to by the courtesy title of Lord or Lady Firstname Lastname (e.g. "Lord Louis Mountbatten", who was referred to as such as the younger son of the Marquess of Milford Haven before his enoblement as the Viscount (later Earl) Mountbatten of Burma).

A different form of modern life peerage was instituted when Prince Edward was made Duke of Edinburgh for life in 2023, with the title to revert to the Crown on the prince's death. This ennoblement differs from other life peerages in that it was not made under the 1958 Act, does not give the prince the right to sit in the House of Lords, and gives him a more elevated rank than baron.

== See also ==
- Peerages in the United Kingdom
- Peerage of the United Kingdom
- List of life peerages: 1958–1979, 1979–1997, 1997–2010, 2010–2024, 2024–present
- List of law life peerages
- Roll of the Peerage
- Cash for Honours
- Crossbencher
- List of related life peers
- Duke of Edinburgh § 2023 creation
