= MoonWalk (charity event) =

Nocturnal charity marathon

The MoonWalk is a night-time charity event organised by UK based grant-making breast cancer charity, Walk the Walk. Women and men power walk either a marathon (“Full Moon”) or half-marathon (“Half Moon”), wearing brightly decorated bras to raise money for breast cancer causes. The event is held annually in London, Edinburgh and Iceland.

Since the first MoonWalk was held in 1998 over 395,000 women and men have raised over £146 million for the breast cancer charity Walk the Walk. Walk the Walk then grants money to other charities and organizations throughout the UK.

Celebrity participants have included Claire Balding, Debbie Chazen, Charlie Condou, Liza Goddard, Jane Hill, Lorraine Kelly, Sally Lindsay, Nell McAndrew, Kirsty McCabe, Jojo Moyes, Paul O’Grady, Sue Perkins, Tom Read Wilson, Aliza Reger, Gaby Roslin, Jennifer Saunders, Penny Smith and Sue Vincent.

Many celebrities and designers have created spectacular decorated bras for Walk the Walk. These bras are put on display at exhibitions to raise awareness.

The charity’s patron is HRH Prince of Wales and the charity’s ambassador is actress Harriet Thorpe.

== Event history ==
In 1996 the charity’s founder, Nina Barough CBE, had a dream that she was power walking the New York City marathon in a bra to raise money for breast cancer. She decided to do just that and that year she and 13 friends walked together and raised £25,000 between them. Two months later Barough found a lump in her breast and was diagnosed with breast cancer. Throughout her treatment she continued walking as a way of staying fit. After receiving the all-clear, Nina and a group of 50 people planned to walk the London Marathon to raise more money. Not all the team could get places so Barough organized her own walking event through London the night before the marathon was due to take place, handing the baton over to the walkers taking part in the official marathon. This is where the idea of a night-time walk and MoonWalk began. Over the years The MoonWalk has grown to include thousands of women and men, who gather together in a huge pink tent before setting off on their night-time challenges.

In 2006 the first MoonWalk Scotland was held in Edinburgh - offering a picturesque route through the city and more distances including a back-to-back double marathon of 52.4 miles ("Over The Moon") and a 6.55 mile walk largely aimed at children (the "New Moon"). To date Walk the Walk has raised over £21.5m through The MoonWalk Scotland, with most of the money raised staying in Scotland.

The MoonWalk Iceland takes place at Lake Myvatn, Iceland, which because of its location and time of year is the only one of the overnight walks to take place in daylight. The route is rural, starting and ending at the lake's hot spring baths.

== Charities supported ==
Money raised by The MoonWalk has been granted to a number of different breast cancer causes including:

- Breast Cancer Now for research which includes the Legacy Study, The Tissue Bank and The Generations Study. Most recently grants have been focused on secondary breast cancers.
- Penny Brohn UK in Bristol, Breast Cancer Haven in London and Leeds, the Christie Hospital in Manchester, Maggie’s Cancer Centres in Scotland, all of whom support and care for people living with cancer
- FACT in Gateshead for pre and post cancer care and support for the community
- Tenovus, for mobile vehicles which travel to rural communities in Wales to provide cancer support, chemotherapy and lymphatic drainage
- Walk the Walk has also supplied Scalp Cooling Equipment to 247 hospitals across the UK. These machines help prevent the loss of hair during chemotherapy treatment.
- Smaller grants have also been made to groups such as the Belfast Lagan Dragons, providing them with two 40 ft boats for their Dragon Boat racing team, which is made up of people who have been affected by breast cancer.
- The Haven
- Maggie's Centres in Scotland
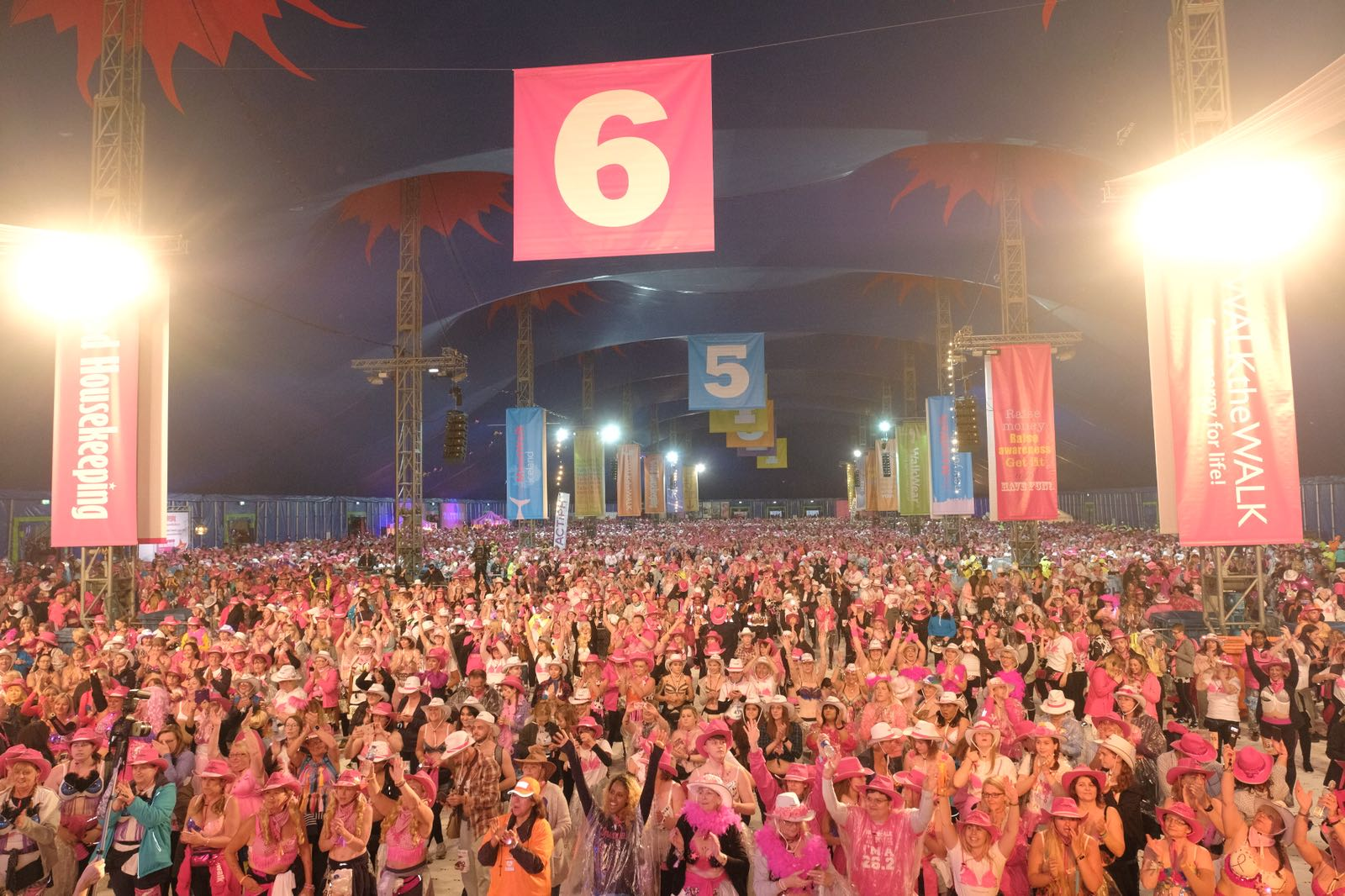
  Moonwalk London 2018 - Clapham Common
