= Nina Barough =

British charity founder

Nina Barough CBE is the Founder and Chief Executive of the grant-making breast cancer charity Walk the Walk.

== History ==
In 1996, Barough was working as a stylist when she had a dream that she was power walking the New York City Marathon in a bra to raise money for breast cancer causes. At the time she had never been involved in charity fundraising and had no connection to breast cancer and although she enjoyed walking she had never power walked before. However, she decided to act on the dream and, with a team of friends she walked the marathon that year raising £25,000 for Breakthrough Breast Cancer.

Two months later Barough found a lump in her breast while on a work trip to the United States and was diagnosed with cancer herself. She gave up her business in order to focus on treatment, undergoing a mastectomy, breast reconstruction, radiotherapy and injections of Zoladex. With the blessing of her surgeon she delayed surgery to take part in the London Marathon.

But in 1998, when a larger group wanted to join her, there were not enough places available so she decided to organise her own event the night before the official London Marathon finishing in Trafalgar Square just before the official marathon started. This evolved into The MoonWalk London, a mass fundraising event which takes place in London every spring.

Since the first walk in 1996, over 370,000 women, men and children have taken part, raising over £131 million for research into breast cancer and to improve the lives of people living with cancer. MoonWalks take place in London, Edinburgh and Iceland. MoonWalkers take part in city marathons including London, Paris, Berlin, Dublin and New York and other fundraising events include an Arctic Challenge back country skiing challenge in Swedish Lapland.

During this time Barough gained expertise in power walking which led to the publication of her book, Walking for Fitness. She makes regular appearances in the media offering fitness advice and championing walking as a low impact way of achieving fitness without risking injury.

Barough continues as Chief Executive of Walk the Walk at its headquarters in Woking, Surrey and is Event Director for all The MoonWalks.

== Honours and awards ==
2004 – The Royal Marsden hospital opened the Nina Barough Pathology Laboratory

2007 - Barough was awarded a CBE for Services to Healthcare.

2007 - Penny Brohn UK named its new residential centre in Bristol after Nina

2008 - Barough received a Pride of Britain award for Fundraiser of the Year, and a Good Housekeeping Woman of the Year Outstanding Achievement Award

2009 - Celebrity Cruises named Barough godmother of ship Equinox

2016 - Received an honorary doctorate from Edinburgh Napier University

2017 - The new Maggie’s Cancer Centre in Forth Valley, for which Walk the Walk is the Principal Funder, was named the Nina Barough Building

== Personal life ==
Barough is married and the couple live in Berkshire with their young daughter.
