= Julia Wilson (scientist) =

British scientist

- Born: Julia Lesley Wilson; Northumberland, England
- Education: Newcastle University
- Scientific career
- Workplaces: Karolinska Institute; Wellcome Sanger Institute; Breakthrough Breast Cancer
- Thesis: Renal transplantation : activation of T lymphocytes by allogeneic cells (1995)
- Doctoral advisor: John Kirby
- Website: www.sanger.ac.uk/person/wilson-julia/

Julia Lesley Wilson is a British scientist who serves as associate director at the Wellcome Sanger Institute. Her research career investigates transplant rejection, cancer and inflammation. She previously worked at the World Cancer Research Fund and Breakthrough Breast Cancer.

== Early life and education ==
Wilson grew up in Northumberland. She became interested in biology whilst at high school, and enjoyed working with the microscopes in the science labs. She studied microbiology as an undergraduate at Newcastle University, and was the first member of her family to attend university. She joined John Kirby's research group as a PhD student where she worked on kidney transplantation and why they were rejected by the immune system.

== Research and career ==
After earning her doctorate, Wilson moved to the Karolinska Institute as a postdoctoral researcher where she worked alongside Hans-Gustaf Ljunggren on transplant rejection. Whilst Wilson enjoyed working in Sweden, she has said that she initially lost confidence during her time in Stockholm because she was less experienced than her colleagues. Wilson returned to the United Kingdom in 1999 and was appointed a postdoc at the Imperial Cancer Research Fund. She was mentored by Fran Balkwill and worked on cancer and inflammation. Wilson realised that she did not want pursue an academic career, and ended up applying for various non-academic jobs. She was made scientific programme manager at the World Cancer Research Fund.

After a few years, Wilson joined Breakthrough Breast Cancer, where she worked on research management. During her time at Breakthrough, the charity discovered PARP inhibitors, target cancer drugs that can be used to treat ovarian cancer. She was selected to take park in a clinical placement course, during which time she shadowed a medical team. The placement was designed to bridge the gap between clinical science and patient care. The placement made her aware of the disconnect between drug discovery and the clinic.

Wilson to joined Wellcome Sanger Institute as associate director in 2014.

=== Selected publications ===
Her publications include:

- Multiple actions of the chemokine CXCL12 on epithelial tumor cells in human ovarian cancer
- Macrophages induce invasiveness of epithelial cancer cells via NF-kappa B and JNK
- The inflammatory cytokine tumor necrosis factor-alpha generates an autocrine tumor-promoting network in epithelial ovarian cancer cells
