= Off-patent Drugs Bill =

British private member's bill

The Off-patent Drugs Bill is a Bill introduced before the Parliament of the United Kingdom by Jonathan Evans in October 2014. It aims to make the British government seek new licences for off-patent medicines that could benefit patients whenever pharmaceutical companies fail to do so because there is no financial incentive. The bill's second reading order lapsed in December 2014. As a private member's bill (from an MP standing down in the 2015 General Election) it is unlikely to progress further. Passage of legislation on off-patent drugs has been supported by charities such as Breast Cancer Now. An Off-patent Drugs Bill was introduced as a PMB in the 2015 Parliament by Nick Thomas-Symonds MP.
