= Barry Gusterson =

British pathologist (born 1946)

Barry Austin Gusterson
- Born: 24 October 1946 (age 80)
- Education: Royal Dental Hospital, St Bartholomew's Hospital and Institute of Cancer Research
- Known for: Initiating the Toby Robins Cancer Research Centre in London and the Wolfson Wohl Cancer Centre in Glasgow. Work on EGFR in head and neck cancer and studies of HER2 in breast cancer and in human breast development
- Spouse: Ann Josephine Davies (m. 1972)
- Awards: Oakley Lecturer (1985); Doniach Lecturer (2009)
- Scientific career
- Fields: Pathology, Cancer
- Workplaces: Institute of Cancer Research; University of Glasgow
- Thesis: In Vitro Study of Tumour Associated Opiate Receptors and Tumour Derived Opioid Activity (1980)

Barry Austin Gusterson (born 24 October 1946) is an Emeritus Professor of Pathology at the University of Glasgow (retired 2010). He was previously Professor of Pathology and Head of the Section of Molecular Pathology at the Institute of Cancer Research in London, and Founding Director of the Toby Robins Breakthrough Breast Cancer Research Centre (re-named the Toby Robins Breast Cancer Now Research Centre). In 2000-2010 he was Professor of Pathology in Glasgow and was the project lead responsible for building the Wolfson Wohl Cancer Centre. He is known for his research on EGFR in head and neck cancer, and HER2 in breast cancer and breast development.

== Education ==
Gusterson was educated at Colchester Royal Grammar School and obtained a BSc in Physiology at St Bartholomew’s Hospital. He then obtained a dental degree (BDS) at the Royal Dental Hospital and a medical degree (MBBS (Hons)) at St Bartholomew’s Hospital. Whilst at the Institute of Cancer Research and Royal Marsden Hospital he obtained a PhD and an MRCPath.

== Career ==
Gusterson held posts in medicine and surgery at St Bartholomew’s Hospital and the Royal Devon and Exeter Hospital and was appointed as Professor of Histopathology at the Institute of Cancer Research and Consultant at the Royal Marsden Hospital in 1986. Whilst at the Institute he held a number of senior positions, including Chairman of the Section of Cell Biology and Experimental Pathology and as a Director on the Institute Governing body. He initiated the concept to build the first dedicated breast cancer research centre and was appointed Founding Director of the Toby Robins, Breakthrough Breast Cancer Research Centre in 1998. His contribution was acknowledged in a Woman’s Hour survey published in the Radio Times in 1996 – ‘top 50 men that women rate’. In 2000 he moved to Glasgow University, where he held a number of positions as Professor of Pathology, and Head of Forensic Science and Medicine, which won an £18.5 M contract from the Crown Office in 2006. Alongside this, he initiated and was Director of the Glasgow Biobank. As Associate Dean for Research in the Medical Faculty and Head of Cancer Sciences he restructured Cancer Sciences. Gusterson chaired the pan-Glasgow pathology Committee that resulted in the unification of all pathology departments across Glasgow and Clyde into a new purpose built building at the Southern General Hospital. In his role as Project Lead, Gusterson was responsible for the building of the Wolfson Wohl Cancer Centre at the Garscube Estate. The two cancer centres initiated by Gusterson were both developed as major fund-raising projects, in which he played a key role as the clinical lead. Gusterson retired in 2011 and became a Director of Moorfield’s Eye Charity and a member of Council for St George's, University of London.

== Research ==
Human Squamous Cell Carcinomas and Skin

Gusterson has 324 cited publications in Semantic Scholar and 302 in Research Gate

Gusterson’s early work focused on in vitro studies of differentiation of human oral mucosa, skin and squamous cell carcinomas of the head and neck. This led to the demonstration of the normal human tissue distribution and overexpression and amplification of the Epidermal Growth Factor Receptors (EGFR) as a feature of squamous cell carcinomas. EGFR is now a target for therapy in Head and Neck cancer, but with limited success. Later studies with Tim Crook and others demonstrated the high expression of p53 in head and neck cancer and mutations in BRCA1 and BRCA2 breast cancers.

The differentiated normal skin in vitro was used for human skin grafts in burns patients.

Breast Cancer and Normal Breast Development

Work was mainly based on clinico-pathological studies of human breast cancer and normal breast development. Working as Director of Pathology for the International Breast Cancer Study Group (IBCSG) a BioBank was established for international clinical trials and a Translational Research Working Group to assess research proposals which Gusterson chaired. This collaboration resulted in numerous publications, including the demonstration of c-erbB-2 (HER2) overexpression as a prognostic indicator in breast cancer and suggested a cut point to define patients that would later benefit from Herceptin. Interpretation of the molecular classifications of breast cancer in the context of the normal lineages in the breast gave insights into the limitations of these new technologies. Work on human breast development described the cell types involved in differentiation of the human breast and their biological significance. Gusterson is also known as an expert in the pathology of animal models of human breast cancer and studies on the biology of involution. With Beatrice Howard the locus was defined for breast development in the mouse mammary gland.

Human Sarcomas

Collaborations with Janet Shipley and Colin Cooper resulted in the identification of translocations and genes in a number of soft tissue sarcomas.
