= Colin the Caterpillar =

Chocolate roll cake, sold by Marks & Spencer

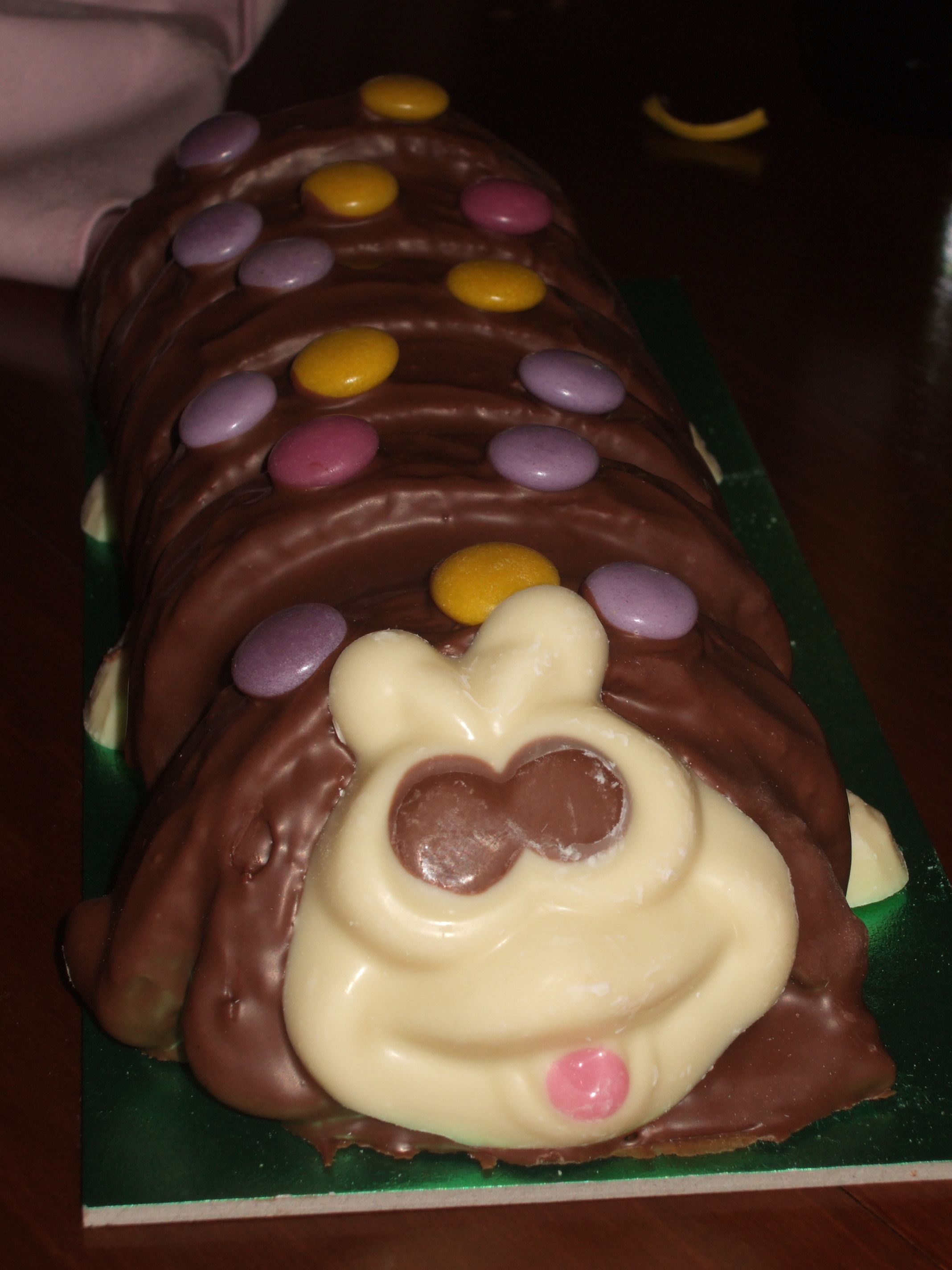
- The roll cake in 2008
- Type: Roll cake
- Place of origin: United Kingdom
- Created by: Marks & Spencer
- Invented: 1990; 36 years ago
- Main ingredients: Chocolate sponge cake, buttercream and shell; white chocolate

Colin the Caterpillar is a chocolate roll cake sold by the major British multinational retailer Marks & Spencer. More than 15 million Colin the Caterpillar cakes have been sold since it was introduced in 1990.

== Overview ==
Colin the Caterpillar is a chocolate sponge roll cake filled with chocolate buttercream and covered in a milk chocolate shell, with sugar-coated milk chocolate beans for decoration. The cake has a decorative face and feet made of white chocolate. The dessert is available in large and small sizes.

According to Marks & Spencer, it takes 38 people to assemble each cake from start to finish, and 8.4 tonnes (8,400 kg) of sugar coating are used each year for the decorative spots.

Initial success for sales of the cake has been attributed to the ongoing popularity of Eric Carle's children's picture book The Very Hungry Caterpillar (1969), and that a bestselling cookbook by Jane Asher, published the same year that the cake launched (1990), also featured a recipe for a caterpillar birthday cake. Colin the Caterpillar has since become a staple of children's birthday parties, but is also popular with teens and adults.

Colin the Caterpillar-design hot chocolate sold by M&S Café, 2023

In 2020, Marks & Spencer marked the cake's 30th anniversary by declaring Colin's birthday, 26 August, as National Colin the Caterpillar Day.

== Variations ==
Over the years, Marks and Spencer has produced several seasonal and limited edition variations on the original Colin the Caterpillar cake:

- Connie the Caterpillar cake – A female version of the original Colin cake, wearing a pink bow
- Personalised cake – Giant versions of the Colin and Connie cakes as part of the "Food to Order" offering, which can serve up to 40 people and can be personalised.
- Wedding cakes – A Colin the Caterpillar wedding cake range was launched in 2017. The range features two cakes, the first called "Colin the Groom" is a larger than standard Colin cake (weighing just over 2 kg) with the face featuring a bow tie and top hat. The bridal version – named Connie the Bride – features a lace veil, confetti and a flower posy and also weighs just over 2 kg.
- 25th anniversary cake – The 25th anniversary of the dessert was marked in August 2015 with a limited edition "Colin the Caterpillar" featuring a party hat and multicoloured feet, and additional candy spots.
- Count Colin the Caterpillar cake – A Count Colin cake was launched for Halloween. The colouring of Colin's face and feet is green rather than the normal white, and his body is decorated with chocolate maggots. It is said to resemble either Frankenstein's monster or a zombie.
- Christmas cake – A festive version of Colin the Caterpillar cake is produced for Christmas. Colin wears a Santa hat, and his body is adorned with a range of festive decorations, including candy canes, holly leaves and snowflakes.
- Coffee morning Colin – A limited edition Colin cake was launched in 2018 for Macmillan Cancer Support's World's Biggest Coffee Morning. Colin's feet were changed to purple, and his body was covered in green and purple sprinkles, instead of the usual multi-coloured ones. 10% of sales were donated to Macmillan Cancer Support.
- Count Colin gummies – Packets of maggot gummies were sold for Halloween, similar to the maggots on the body of the Count Colin cake
- Colin the Caterpillar faces – To mark the 30th Anniversary of the Colin the Caterpillar cake in 2020, bags of Colin the Caterpillar faces were sold. The snacks have white chocolate faces and milk chocolate eyes, similar to those on the standard cake.
- Mini Colin the Caterpillars – Miniature milk chocolate-coated chocolate sponge rolls, filled with chocolate buttercream and decorated with milk chocolate beans and a white chocolate face.
- Flower Power Connie – A redesigned version of Connie the Caterpillar, decorated with yellow and pink flowers and a sporting a floral headband, was released in 2021 for Mother's Day
- Easter eggs – For Easter 2021, a series of Colin the Caterpillar themed Easter products were launched, including a hollow milk chocolate Easter egg, containing a bag of Colin the Caterpillar faces, and a redesigned Colin the Caterpillar cake, which featured Colin wearing a top hat with mini bunny ears and chocolate eggs along his back.
- Colin the Caterpillar cake jars – In April 2021, a series of cakes in jars was launched, featuring raspberry ripple and trillionaire's cake, as well as a Colin the Caterpillar cake version. The Colin the Caterpillar jar featured layers of chocolate sponge with Belgian chocolate sauce, chocolate ganache, milk and white chocolate chips and was topped with Colin's white chocolate face.
- My Hero Colin – A smaller, redesigned version of Colin the Caterpillar, decorated with a blue cape and superhero mask, was released in 2023 for Father's Day

== Other retailers ==
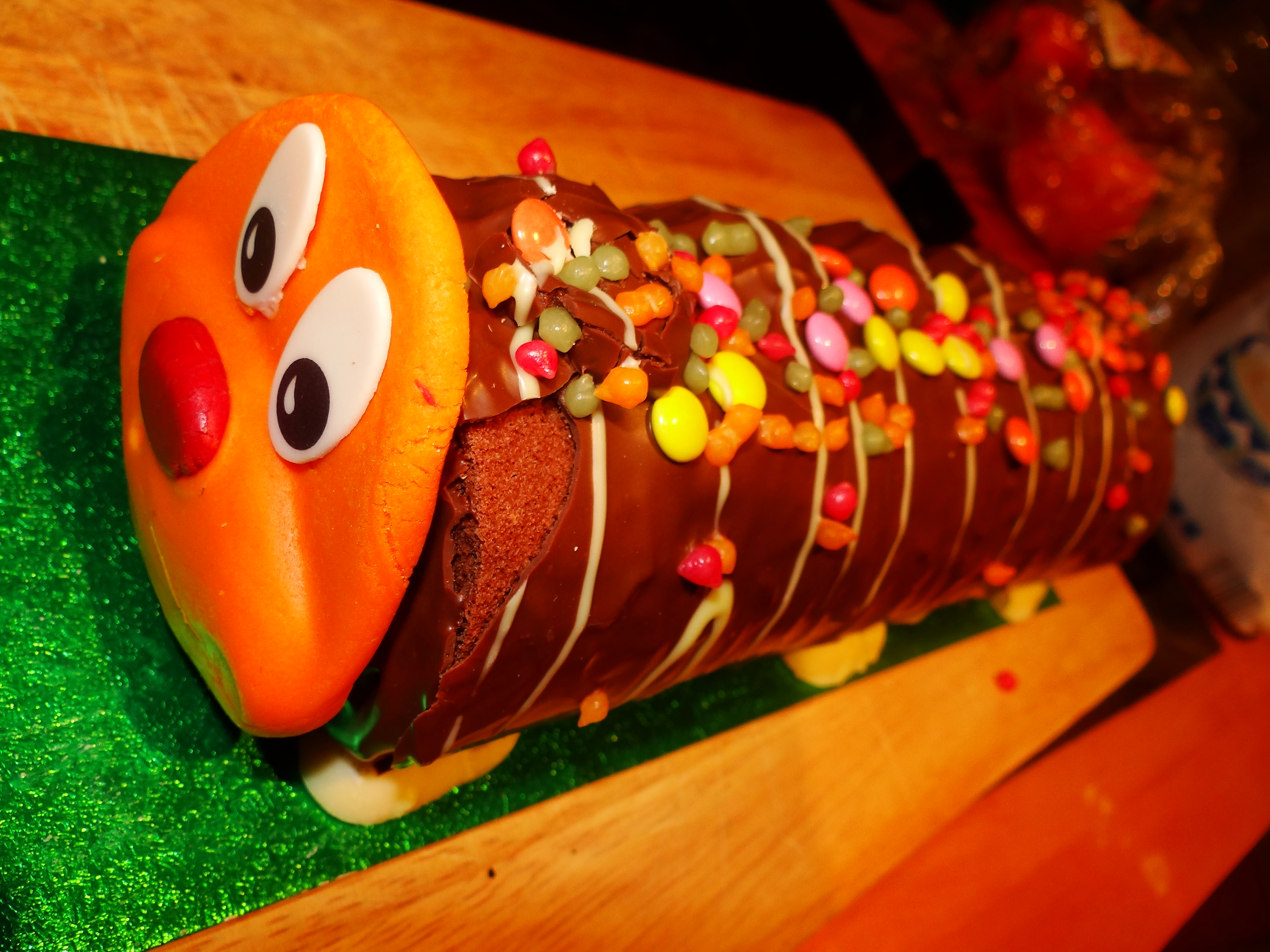
Tesco's "Slinky the Caterpillar" cake

Similar caterpillar cakes are available in other rival retailers. These include:

- Cecil the Caterpillar at Waitrose
- Chris the Caterpillar at Poundland
- Clive the Caterpillar at One Stop
- Clyde the Caterpillar at Asda
- Charlie's Chocolate cake at the Co-op (previously "Curious Caterpillar cake")
- Slinky the Caterpillar at Tesco, as featured in the TV series Slow Horses starring Gary Oldman (a "knock-off Colin the Caterpillar").
- Cuthbert the Caterpillar at Aldi
- Morris the Caterpillar at Morrisons
- Wiggles the Caterpillar at Sainsbury's
- Ciara the Caterpillar and subsequently Cooper the Caterpillar at Lidl

Gluten and milk free versions are also available; Carl the Caterpillar and Stripey the Caterpillar from Tesco, Frieda the Caterpillar from Asda, and Eric the Caterpillar from Sainsbury's.

In April 2021, Marks & Spencer announced that it had lodged an intellectual property claim for infringement of three trade marks with the High Court against Aldi in relation to the latter's Cuthbert the Caterpillar product. In its complaint, Marks & Spencer claimed that Aldi's Cuthbert the Caterpillar was too similar to the Colin the Caterpillar cake, which could lead consumers to believe that they are of the same standard and allows Cuthbert to "ride on the coat-tails" of the M&S cake's reputation. In February 2022, the lawsuit was settled between both parties for an undisclosed amount.

In reaction to the media generated around the court case Papa's Fish and Chips, a fish and chip shop in Cleethorpes, began selling deep-fried Mini Colin the Caterpillar cakes. Profits from the sales were used to raise funds for the Teenage Cancer Trust. Emanuel's, a fish and chip shop in East Kilbride, Scotland, later gained media attention for selling a full-sized Colin the Caterpillar cake that had been deep-fried in batter.

== See also ==
- Percy Pig
- List of Marks & Spencer brands
- List of cakes
- Fudgie the Whale
