= Percy Pig =

Confectionery product

- A packet of Marks & Spencer's Percy Pigs, c. 2005
- Type: Candy
- Place of origin: United Kingdom
- Created by: Marks & Spencer
- Invented: 1992; 34 years ago
- Main ingredients: Pectin; fruit juice

Percy Pig is a British brand of pig-shaped gummy raspberry, strawberry, cherry and grape-flavoured confectionery products made under licence in Germany by Katjes for Marks & Spencer which first appeared in stores in 1992. More than £10 million was grossed between June 2009 and 2010 in Percy Pig sales in Marks & Spencer's UK branches alone. They contain 3.5% fruit juice, and since May 2022 have been suitable for vegans.

== History ==
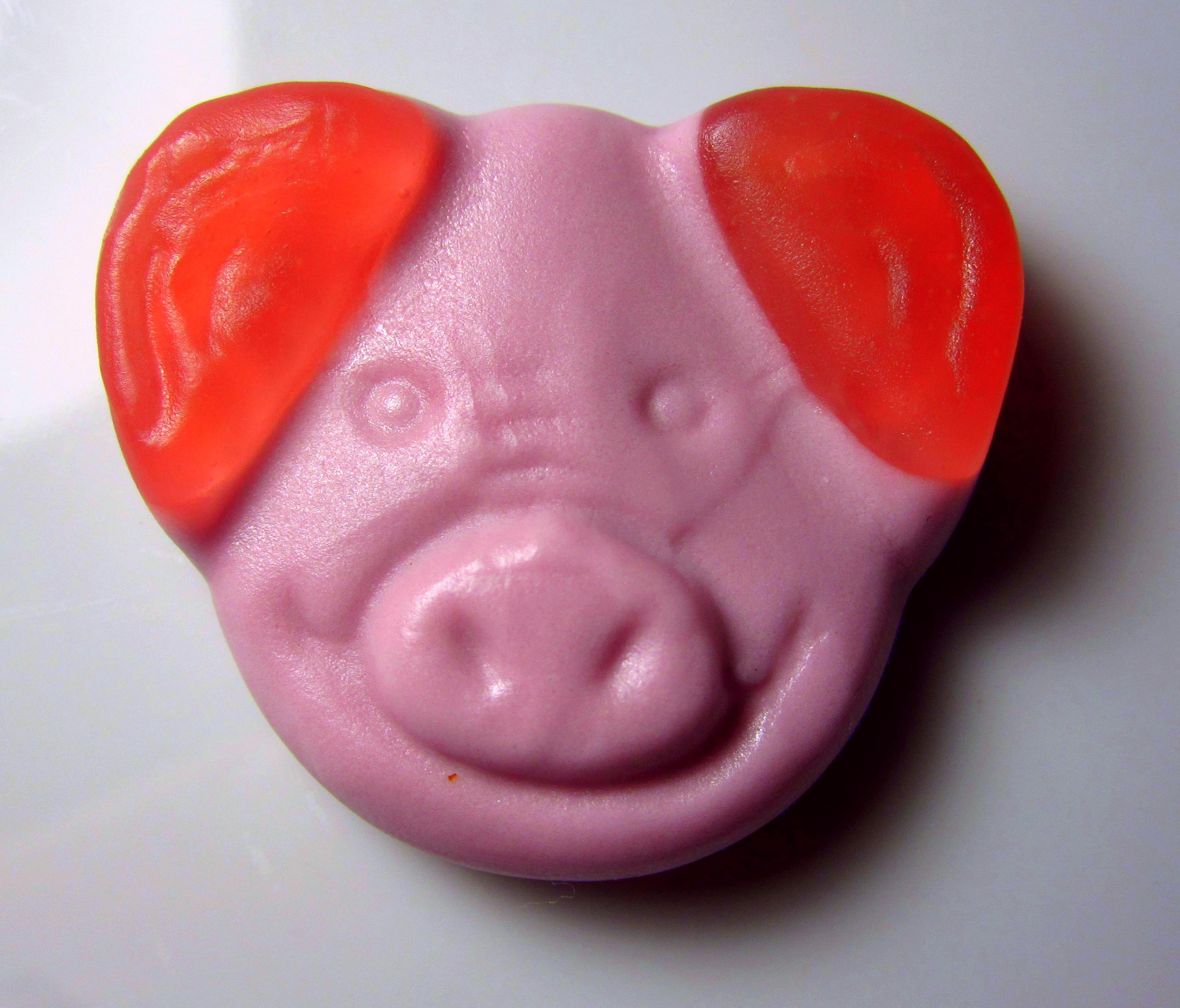
A Percy Pig sweet

Percy Pig was created in 1992 and was sold in strawberry, blackcurrant and raspberry flavours.

After a brief hiatus from the shelves in 1997, the brand returned, and in 2008 the sweets made British Vogue's 2008 hot list at number 11 on the publication's 40 hottest people and trends to watch over the coming months.

The Percy Pig character appeared in M&S's 2021 Christmas advert voiced by actor Tom Holland in the character's first speaking appearance.

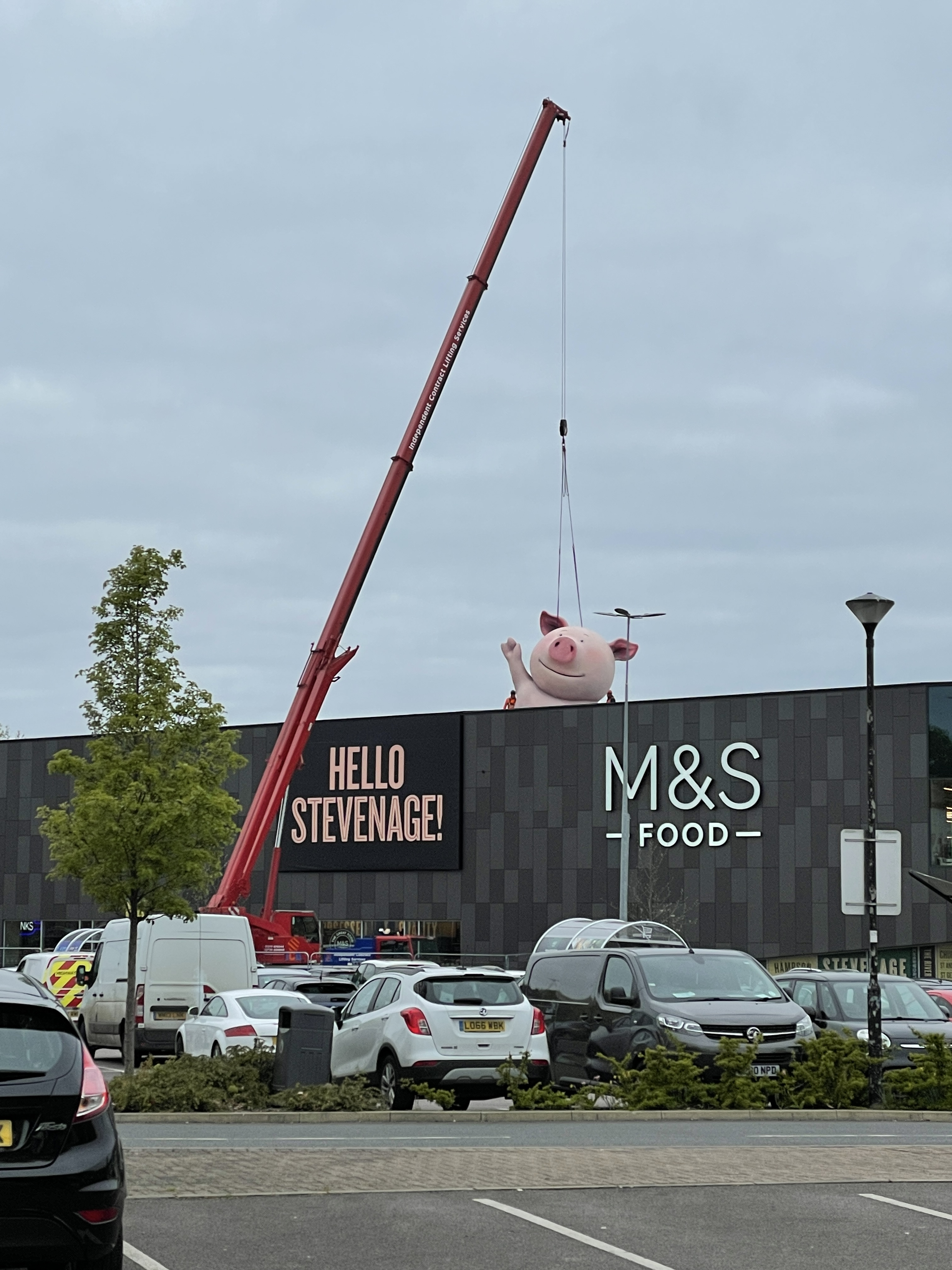
Percy Pig being installed on the roof of the new M&S store in Stevenage, Hertfordshire

In April 2022, a large fibreglass Percy Pig statue was installed on the roof of a newly opened Marks and Spencer store in Stevenage, Hertfordshire, to remain there for a year.

In March 2026, Percy Pig sweets, still with M&S branding, started being sold in Target stores in the United States.

== Ingredients ==
Marks & Spencer Percy Pig sweets originally contained real pig in the form of pork gelatin. In 2011, a "Veggie Percy" range was launched, a vegetarian variety of Percy Pig sweets replacing the gelatin with beeswax and pea protein, with green ears to indicate they were vegetarian.

In 2016, M&S began using a gelatin-free recipe for some other varieties of Percy Pig sweets, and from May 2019 all Percy Pig sweets were 100 per cent gelatin-free, instead using pectin. This change also saw a new logo and packaging designs across the range.

In 2022, beeswax was removed from the recipe, making the product suitable for vegans.

== Variations ==
Following on from the success of the original Percy Pig sweets, new varieties, flavours and characters were introduced. Amongst the first were "Percy Pig & Pals", which besides Percy also contained a cow (cola flavour) and sheep (orange and strawberry flavour) and "Percy Piglets", which are smaller versions of the main sweets. A lemon and orange "Penny Pig" sweet was introduced in 1998, and retired a few years later.

Besides the sweet range itself, Percy Pig has expanded to fruit juices, fizzy drinks, chocolates, popcorn, biscuits, cakes, muffins, ice cream, dessert sauces and mince pies, amongst others. In 2020, Marks & Spencer relaunched a Percy Pig advent calendar after being discontinued in 2018 and 2019. Toys, books, socks, party equipment, bed linen and piggy banks are amongst the non-food items with the Percy Pig branding.

=== List of Percy Pig sweets ===
- Percy Pig
- Percy Pig Original Veggie (previously called "Veggie Percy")
- Reduced Sugar Percy Pig
- Percy Pig Piglets
- Percy Pig and Pals
- Percy Pig Fruity Chews
- Percy Pig Phizzy Pigtails
- Percy Pig Squidgy Snouts
- Percy Pig Head in the Clouds
- Percy Pig Party Time
- Percy Pig Reversy Percy
- Percy Pig and His Chirping Chicks
- Percy Pig You Give Me Butterflies

=== Seasonal variations ===
- Percy Pig Gets Spooky (previously known as "Pumpkin Percy"; Halloween themed sweets)
- Merry Percymas! (Christmas themed sweets)
- Percy Pig Festive Fun
- Easter Party Percy Pig (previously known as "Percy Meets the Easter Bunny"; Easter themed sweets)

=== Discontinued variations ===
- Rosy Noses
- Percy's Pig Pen (Percy Pig sweets with household object-shaped sweets)
- Percy in a Twist (fizzy laces in a twist – vegetarian)
- Percy in the Pink (Percy Pig chocolate)
- Percy's Pig Sty
- Percy's Percynalities (Percy Pig sweets with differing faces)
- Percy's Family Mix (a mixture of Percy Pig, Penny Pig and the piglets)
- Percy's Parents
- Percy Pig Loves Penny (previously known as "Percy and Penny")
- Percy Pig Goes Globetrotting (previously known as "Globetrotting Percy")

=== Other retailers ===
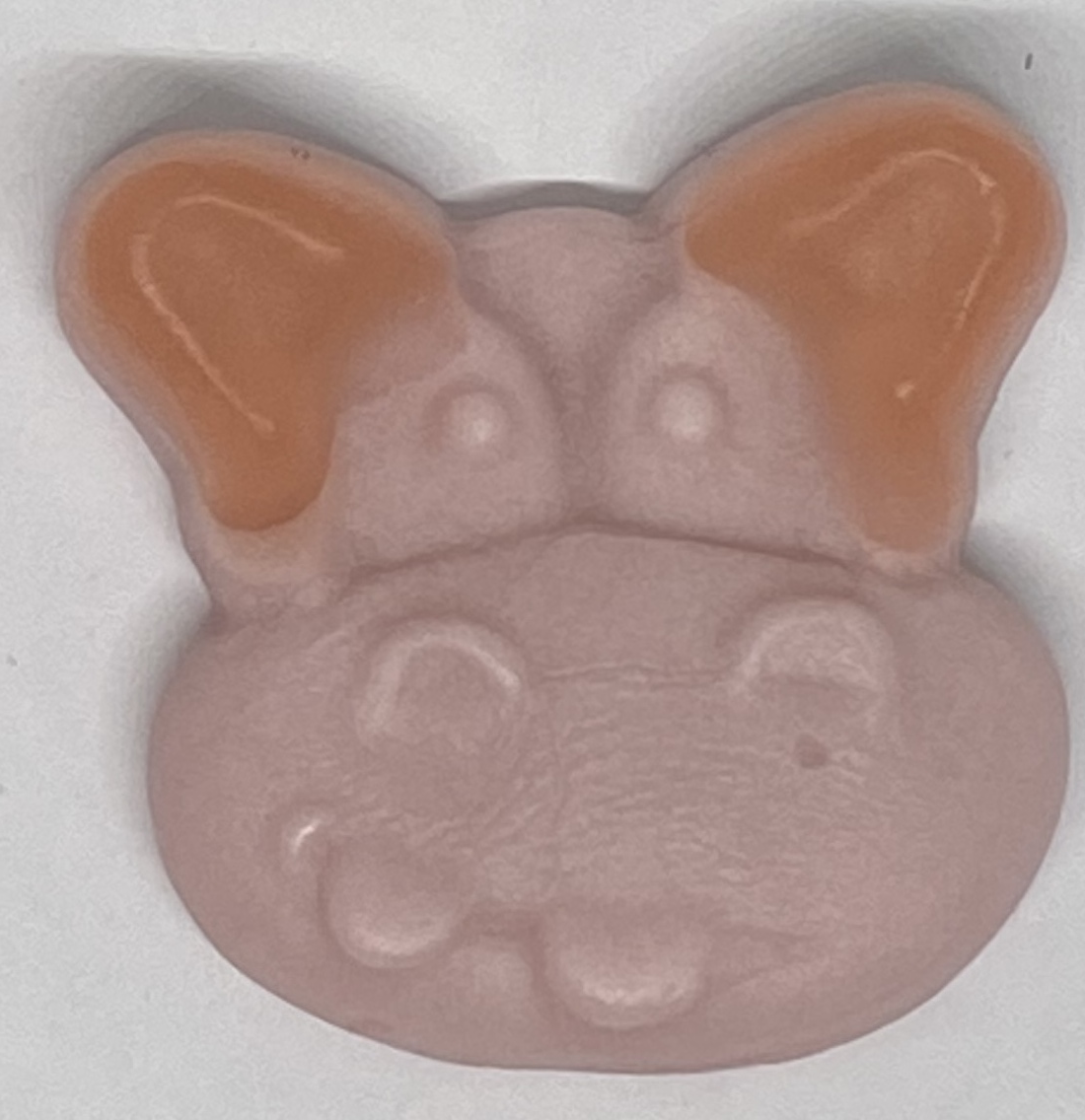
Henry Hippo, sold in Lidl

Similar sweets are available from other retailers. Lidl has "Henry Hippo" sweets and Aldi has "Leo the Lion", both of which are also vegan. Poundland, a discount retailer, released their own version in 2019 called "Dinky Dogs", Sainsbury's produced "Eric the Elephant" sweets, but they have since been discontinued. In 2023, Swizzels agreed to redesign its "Pigs Mugs" sweets at the request of Marks & Spencer's lawyers, having sold them since 1996.

Outside of the United Kingdom, similar products in other countries are the Dutch "Katja Biggetjes", the French "Petit Cochon" (launched 2007), the German "Fred Ferkel" and the Australian "Peggy Pig and Pals" introduced in Coles Supermarkets in 2009.

== See also ==
- Colin the Caterpillar
- List of Marks & Spencer brands
