= List of Marks & Spencer brands =

The major British multinational retailer Marks & Spencer has used a number of brand names for its present and former products and services.

== Product line history ==
St Michael
- Product type: Marks & Spencer brand
- Introduced: 1928
- Discontinued: 2000
- Founder: Simon Marks

=== St Michael ===
The St Michael brand was introduced by Simon Marks in 1928, named after his father and co-founder of Marks & Spencer, Michael Marks. By 1950, virtually all goods were sold under the St Michael brand. M&S lingerie, women's clothing and girls' uniforms used the St Margaret brand, until the whole range of general merchandise became St Michael.

In 2000, the company shifted to the Marks & Spencer brand. The St Michael name was subsequently adopted as a 'quality guarantee' and appeared for a time as the St Michael Quality Promise on the back of food products, on the side of delivery vehicles and on in-store ordering receipts. St Michael returned to a limited extent as an emblem on clothing in 2021.

=== Major product lines ===
The company put its main emphasis on quality, including a 1957 stocking size measuring system. For most of its history, it has also had a reputation for offering fair value for money.

The synthetic fibre Tricell was first used in 1957 and lasted until the 1970s and another synthetic fibre called Courtelle was first launched nationally by Marks & Spencer during 1960 and also lasted well into the 1970s. Machine washable wool first appeared in 1972 and Lycra hosiery first came in during 1986.

M&S launched their own brands of domestic products, such as washing powder and aluminium foil in 1972, under the brand name of 'House-care'.

M&S has sold Christmas cakes and Christmas puddings since 1958. In an effort to improve the quality of their Swiss rolls, they hired the food expert Nat Goldberg, who made a major improvement across their entire cake range, which had lost the public's favour a few years earlier. As a later measure to improve food quality food labelling was improved and "sell by dates" were phased in between 1970 and 1972.

Boil-in-the-bag and sachet meals were first pioneered by M&S in 1972 and the award-winning Gastropub food range was launched in 2004. The 'Melting middle chocolate pudding' campaign of 2005 led to a remarkable 3,000% rise in chocolate pudding sales, something that has not reoccurred since.

The successful Autograph brand was launched in 2000 and was originally meant to be for men, but had now moved on to cover children and women by 2005. The 1996–1997 'Orient Express Tagged' brand was the first of numerous new brands, most of which were in feminine and children's clothes. The 'Orient Express Tagged' brand was part of the inspiration behind the 'Portfolio' brand. The men's Autograph brand was then launched in 2000 and continues to this day.

The Percy Pigs sweets were first created in 1992 and the billionth Percy Pig sweet was sold by October 2007.

M&S's relatively successful interior design 'Homeware' brand was launched in 2005 and renamed 'Home' in 2006. It features products like vases, furniture, beds etc.

Plus range maternity – larger sizes of maternity clothes – were absorbed into the already existing 'Limited Collection Maternity', under the name of 'M&S Maternity' in 2008 to simplify administration.

The women's 'Perfect' and 'Essential' sub-brands were largely relaunched in 2009 as the 'Portfolio' range, but without the high end designer blouses. Perfect still operates in men's rain coats and cookware. Perfect was relaunced in January 2010 as a seasonal sub-brand of Portfolio.

== The firm's major clothing lines ==
M&S markets its major adult clothes ranges under the following brand names:

=== Limited collection ===
Brand	Line	Customer gender	Products	Source(s)
Limited Collection	Limited collection Junior	Unisex	Kids' Partywear, posh clothes, smart shoes, designer clothes and party wear	
Limited Collection (larger stores only)	-	Women	Smart-casual clothing, lingerie and hosiery	
Limited Collection (limited stores only and online)	-	Men	Smart-casual clothing, aimed at a young 'edgy' style	

=== Per Una ===
Brand	Line	Customer gender	Products	Source(s)
Per Una	–	Female	Designer fashion garments, belts, tunics, hats, shoes, bags, scarfs, night clothes, bags, umbrellas, belts, lingerie and hosiery.	
Per Una	Buy me now or lose me for ever- limited stock.	Female	Per Una's discounted and one-off special edition designer clothes	–
Per Una	Per Una Petite (only available online)	Female	Per Una's small clothes	-

Per Una is a range of younger female's clothing sold at M&S stores, launched on 28 September 2001 as a joint venture between M&S and Next founder George Davies. The brand name means for one (woman) in Italian. All Per Una items include the three hearts logo, inspired by a postcard seen by Davies while on holiday in Italy.

The Per Una brand has been a major success for the company, and in October 2004, M&S bought the brand in a £125 million, two-year service contract with George Davies. Davies was to stay on for at least two years to run the company, with 12 months notice required if he wished to leave.

The teenagers' line called Per Una Due was launched in early 2004, but sales were poor and it was discontinued in May 2004, while the adult lines flourished by 2010.

The Designer Discount brand was relaunched in the festive season 2008–2009 as Buy me now or lose me forever – limited stock.

==== Planned new Per Una sub-brands ====
M&S also announced it was planning to take over Twiggy's Twiggy international label during the winter of 2010 and merge it into Per Una.

=== North Coast ===
Brand	Line	Customer gender	Products	Source(s)
North Coast	–	Men	Cool, easy and relaxed casuals, scarfs and hats	–

=== Portfolio ===
Brand	Line	Customer gender	Products	Source(s)
Portfolio	Perfect	Unisex	Coats, posh skirts, tunics, scarfs, belts, lingerie and hosiery	

Portfolio This is aimed at the core 40–55 businesswoman. It is meant to offer all that is close to her feminine side. The shoes, trouser suits, blouses and frocks will be UK sourced and the T-shirts will involve fair trade cotton from India, Bangladesh and Pakistan. It has incorporated some products from the former Perfect and Essential sub-brands. Portfolio Cashmere had absorbed the other male and female M&S cashmere jumper lines. Portfolio (headed by Marie Helvin since 2008) recently began to issue Speziale fashion trousers and Jeggings in a final bid for customers in late 2010 The Portfolio brand is currently being phased out.

=== Indigo collection ===
Brand	Line	Customer gender	Products	Source(s)
Indigo Collection (headed by Myleene Klass)	–	Female	Casual women's clothes, scarfs, gloves, hand bags and belts	
Indigo collection	Denim	Female	Women's jeans	–
Indigo collection	Casual	Female	Women's casual tops	–
The Indigo collection junior	Indigo Company	Boys	Casual shirts, casual jeans and play wear	–
The Indigo collection junior	–	Unisex	Posh clothes for kids	-
Indigo baby	–	Unisex	Hats, baby clothes, blanket sleepers, Romper suits, cot blankets, babies' and bibs by the Indigo line	-
The Indigo collection junior	Denim junior	Unisex	Children's high-end/upmarket jeans	

The Indigo collection This is a new range, aimed at the core, 18–25, feminine type. It is meant to offer all that is close to her feminine side. The shoes, trousers and jeans will be UK and Bangladeshi-sourced and the T-shirts will involve fair trade cotton from Senegal, Bangladesh, India and Pakistan. Beachwear may be added to the list if the success continues.

It has a sub-brand product range called Denim which deals with women's jeans.

Babywear was reduced to woolly hats, gloves, socks and bed linen after its baby clothes, blanket sleepers, Romper suits, cot blankets, babies' bibs, non-woolly hats, socks and cot linen were turned into the Indigo Baby line in January 2011.

=== Autograph ===
Brand	Line	Customer gender	Products	Source(s)
Autograph (headed by John Powell)	–	Unisex	Unisex and/or mixed ranges of hats, belts, scarves, gloves, bags, plus women's lingerie, tunics and hosiery. Smart-casual clothing exclusively designed for M&S by designers such as Nigel Hall, Jeffery West and Timothy Everest.	
Autograph	Casual	Male	Smart-casual clothing	
Autograph	Autograph weekend	Unisex	Smart and casual clothes	
Autograph	Formal	Male	Formal shirts, ties, and suits	–
Autograph	Fair trade	Unisex	As the name suggests, it is for fair trade cotton T-shirts from India, Sri Lanka, Pakistan, Bulgaria and Senegal.	–
Autograph junior	–	Male	Boys' smart clothes, bags, belts, shoes, coats and partyware	
Autograph	Luxury	Male	Upmarket knitwear for men	–

Autograph celebrated its tenth birthday in January 2010.

=== Marks and Spencer ===
Brand	Line	Customer gender	Products	Source(s)
Marks and Spencer	Linen with love	Female	Linen clothes	–
Marks and Spencer	Skirts (major stores only)	Female	Cheap, utilitarian 'good value' skirts	–
Marks and Spencer	Original and authentic laundry, soft linen cloths	Female	Linen casual tops	–
Marks and Spencer	Original and authentic linen issue	Female	Linen clothes	
Marks and Spencer	Original and authentic laundry, lovingly laundered	Female	Linen tops	–
Marks and Spencer	Original and authentically crumpled	Female	Linen shirts and blouses	–
Marks and Spencer	Basic Jeans	Female	Cheap, good value, utilitarian jeans	–
Marks and Spencer	Fair trade	Female	As the name suggests, it is for fair trade cotton T-shirts and jeans from India, Sri Lanka, Pakistan, Bangladesh and Senegal.	–
Marks and Spencer	Performance sportswear	Female	A line of serious sportswear for dedicated female athletes	–
Marks and Spencer	Perfect-tee	Female	Upmarket T-shirts.	–
Marks and Spencer	Umbrellas	Female	Cheap, good value, utilitarian umbrellas	–
Marks and Spencer	Basic Jeans junior	Female	Girls' cheap, good value, utilitarian jeans	–
Marks and Spencer	–	Female	Girls' shoes	–

Linen shop is the department in larger stores which sells the various linen articles listed above along with some linen items from other lines and brands.

=== Classic collection ===
Brand	Line	Customer gender	Products	Source(s)
Classic Collection	Seasonal Classics	Female	Smart and smart casual seasonal clothes, scarves and hats	
Classic Collection	Summer Classics	Female	Smart and smart casual seasonal clothes, scarves and hats	
Classic	–	Men	Underwear, scarves, socks and pyjamas	–

Classic Collection is a new seasonal range, aimed at the core 55+ retired woman. It is meant to offer all that is close to her feminine side. The shoes, skirts, blouses and frocks will be UK sourced and the T-shirts will involve fair trade cotton from India and Pakistan. It has 'Seasonal Classics' and 'Summer Classics' lines.

=== Blue Harbour ===
Brand	Line	Customer gender	Products	Source(s)
Blue Harbour	–	Men	Men's casual brand	
Blue Harbour	Heritage	Men	Men's casual brand	–
Blue Harbour	Luxury	Men	Higher-end casual clothing	–
Blue Harbour	Golf	Men	Golf clothing	–

Blue Harbour is a men's casuals brand, and includes the sub-brands Heritage, Luxury and Golf.

== Other clothing lines ==
=== Other adult only clothes lines ===
M&S markets its miscellaneous and specialist adult clothes ranges under the following product ranges:

Brand	Line	Customer gender	Products	Source(s)
Sportsware	–	Female	Casual feminine sportswear	
Bridal (only available online)	–	Female	Wedding clothes	–
Love Life, love leisure	–	Female	Casual feminine sportswear	-
Petite Collection (selected stores only)	–	Women	Small clothes	–
Love Pink	–	Women	M&S periodically markets charitable clothes for Breakthrough Breast Cancer.	
M&S Maternity (larger stores only)	–	Female	Maternity clothes	
Ceriso	–	Women	Lingerie, night clothes and hosiery	
Body	-	Women	Lingerie, night clothes and hosiery	
Post surgical, maternity and sporting	-	Women	As their name suggests, it is a line of post surgical, maternity and sporting bras.	
Stormwear	–	unisex	Water-repellent clothing, includes denim, shorts, chinos, coats, footwear, thermal gloves and suits	–
Big & Tall (only available online)	-	Male	Larger sized clothing only available from marksandspencer.com	–
Long & Tall (only available online)	-	Female	Larger sized clothing only available from marksandspencer.com	–
Ultimate	-	Male	High end suits, trousers, shirts, ties and blazers	
Ultimate	-	Female	Lingerie and hosiery	
Brazil's	–	Women	Brazils and Tangas	
Occasions	-	Female	Posh hats, bags and scarves	-
Collette headed by Collette Dinnigan (only available online)	–	Female	Sexy lingerie and nightwear	
Cool & Fresh	-	Male	Underwear and socks that keep one cool and fresh by absorbing excess moisture on the skin	-
Climate Control	–	Male	Underwear, hats and socks that keep one cool in the summer and warm in the winter using technology from NASA	–
Wearing the waste	-	Unisex	Coats and bags made out of recycled plastic bottles	–
Collezione	–	Men	Formal, Italian inspired clothing	
The Sartorial Collection	–	Men	Formal suits, inspired by Savile Row	

Miami Issue

- Miami Issue – unisex beachwear

M&S Maternity

- M&S Maternity (larger stores only)

Perfect

- Perfect – upmarket T-shirts, upmarket trousers, skirts and blouses (merged into Portfolio, along with Essential)

Plus range maternity

- Plus range maternity's larger sizes of maternity clothes were absorbed into the already existing 'Limited Collection Maternity', under the name of 'M&S Maternity' in 2008 to simplify administration.

Thermal luxury

- Thermal luxury – unisex thermals

Ultimate

- Ultimate – women's socks and hosiery

Adored

- Adored – sexy, specialist and thermal women's socks and hosiery, but merged with Ultimate in 2012

Katy Livingston

- Katy Livingston – upmarket sports clothes and merchandise relating to the British athlete Katy Livingston

The Zandra Rhodes collection

- The Zandra Rhodes collection – upmarket woollen clothes modelled and made by the British fashion designer Zandra Rhodes, CBE/RDI

Party, Party, Party!

- Party, Party, Party! – seasonal party clothes; reduced to women's wear in 2012

Breakthrough Breast Cancer

- M&S periodically markets charitable Love Pink clothes for Breakthrough Breast Cancer. M&S has sold a wide range of charitable women's clothes for Breakthrough Breast Cancer for many years.

Essential

- Essential – upmarket skirts and T-shirts (merged into Portfolio, along with Perfect)

Plus range maternity

- Plus range maternity – large stores only; merged with Limited Collection Maternity as 'M&S Maternity'

Limited Collection Maternity

- Limited Collection Maternity – merged with Plus Range Maternity as 'M&S Maternity'

Tailoring

- Tailoring – formal shirts, ties, and formal accessories

Floor 1 discount brands

- Floor 1 discount brands – women's discount fashion clothes (replaced by the 'Designer discount' line)

=== Other children's only clothes ===
M&S markets its miscellaneous and specialist childrenswear under the following brand names:

Brand	Line	Customer gender	Products	Source(s)
Skiware	–	Unisex	Children's ski wear	
Essential-Value-Essential-Quality	–	Unisex	Children's cheap, utilitarian 'good value' clothes	
'Living the Dream'	-	Boys	The successful (available online only) 'Living the Dream' children's range of Lewis Hamilton, Heikki Kovalainen and Jenson Button memorabilia and merchandise	
Bridal and confirmation (Only available online)	–	Girls	Bridal and confirmation clothes	–
World Cup\Football Shop	–	Boys	Periodical World cup and general footballing merabilia and merchandise for kids	
School	–	Unisex	School uniform, belts and bags	.
Fair trade	–	Unisex	Fair trade cotton socks from India, Morocco, Bulgaria and Senegal.	–
Dress-up	–	Unisex	Fancy dress	
My Baby Mini World	-	Unisex	Newborn size children's clothes	
Character shop	–	Unisex	Children's cartoon story books, merchandise and character clothing (like Dora the Explorer and Thomas the Tank Engine), etc.	

Living the dream

- The successful (online only) 'Living the Dream' children's range of Lewis Hamilton & Heikki Kovalainen memorabilia and merchandise was launched in September 2009. Merchandise also relating to his fellow racing driver, Jenson Button was added to the range during April 2010. Both were only available in bigger stores, but were only available on line in late 2010.

World Cup

- World Cup (2002/2006/2010)- Periodical World cup (some media critics said Fascist) memorabilia and merchandise for kids.

Plus fit

- Plus fit- Was launched in selected stores during July 2010 and are large sized children's clothes. It has proven to be a very popular line.

Party, Party, Party!

- Party, Party, Party! – seasonal party clothes; reduced to women's wear in 2012

Ready to play

- Ready to play playwear

Sleep

- Sleep – children's night clothes

Casual

- Casual – children's casual clothes and shoes

Partyware

- Partyware – children's party clothes

Denim

- Denim – children's jeans

The Shirt-sleeve empire

- The Shirt-sleeve empire – boys' shirts (was only available online in 2010)

Both Sleepwear, Twinkle toes, Casual Junior, The Shirt-sleeve empire, Partyware and Occasionwear were all merged into either Occasions, Indigo Junior or Autograph Junior over the Festive season of 2010–2011.

=== Other babywear lines ===
M&S markets its miscellaneous and specialist babywear under the following brand names:

- Babywear – unisex hats, gloves, socks, shoes and cot linen
- Petite babe – unisex small and premature babies
- Pure cotton – pure cotton unisex baby clothes
- Ready to play – playwear
- Romper-suit republic – baby clothes (was only available online until 2011)
- Fashion – babies' fashion clothes

Babywear was reduced to woolly hats, gloves, socks and bed linen- after its baby clothes, blanket sleepers, romper suits, cot blankets, babies' bibs, non-woolly hats, socks and cot linen were turned in the Indigo Baby line, along with Romper-suit republic and Fashion in the January 2011.

=== Breakthrough Breast Cancer ===
M&S periodically markets charitable clothes for Breakthrough Breast Cancer.

- B.C.A.UK (on line charitable T-shirts for the under 40's).
- B.C.A.M. (charitable merchandise aimed at raising awareness of breast cancer).

=== Revamped lines ===
April 2013 saw the M&S lingerie chief, Janie Schaffer, quit after only months in the job.

15 May 2013 saw the launch of the 'Best of British range' as well as the overhaul of Per Una and Indigo. Patrick Bousquet-Chavanne – currently M&S's corporate director of strategy implementation and business development became the new marketing director and wii succeed Steven Sharp in July. Mark Bolland also vowed to bring "quality and style back"

The chain already has 20 UK suppliers and is looking to increase that number.

== Shoes ==
Men

- Collezione (men)
- Airflex (men)

Women

- Insola (women)
- Classic (women)
- Footglove (women)
- Limited Collection (women)
- Per Una (women)
- Portfolio (women)
- Shoes, shoes, shoes (women) high-end shoes

Unisex

- Autograph (both sexes)
- Wide Fit (both sexes), wide fitting shoes.
- Secret Support (both sexes), support shoes for weak feet.

== Cosmetics, toiletries and perfumes ==
Men

- Harvard
- Autograph
- Autograph Sport
- Woodspice
- Blue Energy
- Formula For Men

Women

- Isis (women)
- Tess Daly beauty (upmarket make up sets)
- Florentyna
- Natural Beauty
- Earth Spa
- In-bloom
- Infusions
- Butterfly eau de toilette
- Royal jelly
- Ingredients
- Formula – skincare and suncare
- Cotton Collection (toiletries and soaps).
- Floral collection (toiletries and soaps).
- Beauty Care- Skin cream/pads.

Unisex

- Perfection (Autograph's & Per Una's perfumeries merged into one in early 2009)
- True red – seasonal toiletries

== Branded cosmetics, toiletries and perfumery ==
Skincare

- Moroccan
- UltraSun
- H2O Plus
- NUXE
- Apivita
- REN
- Global Escape
- Royal Jelly

Make Up

- Hello Kitty
- Leighton Denny
- Purminerals
- Diego Dalla Palma

Bath & Body

- Philip Kingsley
- Floral Collection
- Roger & Dallet

== Home ==
=== Interior design, kitchen equipment, bedding and furnishings ===
Brand	Line	Products	Source(s)
Kids' bedroom	–	Kids' furniture, especially bedroom stuff	
Furniture	-	Beds, sofas, tables, cupboards, bedroom suites, bathroom furniture, dining suites.	
Furniture	Alfresco	High-end garden furnishings	
Soft furnishings	–	Cushions, throws, curtains, tablecloths	–
Soft furnishings	Supima	Pillows, bedding, sheets, tablecloths	–
Hard furnishings	-	Vases, glassware, candles, plates, ornaments, lamp stands, lamp bulbs	–
Hard furnishings	Adente	Vases, candles, plates, cups, ornaments, lamp stands	–
Hard furnishings	Nouair	Vases and plates	–
Hard furnishings	Ruge	Vases and plates.	–
Hard furnishings	Manhattan	Vases and plates.	–
Hard furnishings	Hamilton	Vases and plates.	–
Kitchens	Lyon	Crockery, kitchen electrical, utensils, pans	
Kitchens	Maxim	Crockery, kitchen electrical, utensils, pans	
Bathrooms	–	Towels, linen baskets, accessories	–
Kitchens	Dine with me	Festive season wine glasses, plates and eating sets	–

=== Other products ===
- Technology – In 2006, the company launched a range of domestic technology products. Over thirty-six stores offered this range. Additional services offered included television installation and technical help. Satellite navigation products were launched in January 2010.
- Travelware – The Lexington light and Ontario heavy luggage and Scorpius utility rollercase lines.
- Toy shop – Children's toys.
- First reader – Young children's and toddlers' learning, story and fairy tale books.

== Food and drink ==
=== Own branded food stuffs ===
Brand	Line	Products	Source(s)
Count on us	–	Diet food in general	–
The cook range	-	Multi-ethnic Takeaway meals.	-
The cook range	Cook Chinese	Ready-made Chinese takeaways.	–
The cook range	Cook India	Ready-made Indian and takeaways.	–
The cook range	Cook East	Ready-made Thai takeaways.	–
Count on us	Simply Fuller, Longer	Specifically designed diet food to help you either lose or maintain weight.	
Simply Kids	–	Kids' biscuits, sweets and cakes	–
Gastropub	–	ready meals inspired by pub cuisine for home cooking	
Gastropub	Bistro range	Bistro inspired ready meals.	-
Gastropub	Lunchtogo	Upmarket and businessmens' grab bag and packed lunch meals.	.
Wise Buys	–	Discount and value food	–
Fair trade	–	Fair trade food, tea, coffee and wine	–
Free range	-	free-range eggs, Oakham chicken and field-bred pork.	
Percy Pig and Penny Pig/Colin the Caterpillar	–	Percy Pig and Penny Pig/Colin Caterpillar sweets	

=== Major brands ===
Free range

- Free range –- free-range eggs, Oakham chicken and field-bred pork. Oakham chicken is exclusive to M&S, and is not from the Rutland town of Oakham. Free-range eggs have been on sale since 1997 and M&S is deeply committed to upholding animal welfare.

Gastropub

- Gastropub are ready meals inspired by pub cuisine for home cooking It got a 'Golden pub-meal commendation' in 2005.
- Lunchtogo – upmarket and businessmen's grab bag and packed lunch meals. The 'Food to go line' was merged into it during the festive season of 2010–2011.
- Bistro range- A range of Bistro inspired meals launched during the festive season of 2010–2011.

Percy Pig

Percy Pigs is a popular brand of pig-shaped raspberry-flavoured confectionery made under licence in Germany for Marks & Spencer. The sweets first appeared in stores in the mid-1990s. The name "Percy Pig" has now been trademarked by Marks & Spencer. More than £10,000,000 was grossed between June 2009 and 2010 in Percy Pig sales in Marks & Spencer's UK branches alone. They are made up of just under 3.5% fruit juice.

Percy Pigs were created in 1995 and were sold in strawberry and raspberry flavours. Until 2008, Percy Pigs were available in 100, 200 and 400 grams. The packaging has not changed size, but the middle size now contains 170 grams and the large size now contains 340 grams. There is also the related Colin the Caterpillar sweet that was first launched in the festive season of 2008–2009.

=== Alcohol ===
M&S has an extensive wine and beer range, which was begun in 1973.

In 2006 and 2007, M&S entered over a hundred of its own wines into two wine competitions, The Decanter World Wine Awards and The International Wine Challenge. Both years, almost every wine won an award, ranging from the 2005 Secano Pinot Noir, Leyda Valley, Chile (Best Pinot Noir in the world for under £10) to the Rosada Cava (Commended).

- Beer – UK and EU-sourced beers
- Wine – a worldwide selection of fine wine, including Chardonnay and Shiraz

=== Branded food products ===
- In November 2009, Marks & Spencer announced that it would begin selling up to 400 branded lines, such as Kellogg's & Heinz. In November 2010, it was speculated that they may discontinue up to 300 of these branded products to push their brand further.

== Gift shop/Christmas gifts and ideas shop ==
The gift shop sells cut flowers, greetings cards, Christmas hampers, jewellery, watches and upmarket chocolates. The 'Christmas gifts and ideas shop' is the Christmas version and sells gifts, toys and Christmas decorations. The online flower service was accused of unfair trading and using Google to piggy-back advertise on online searches aimed at Interflora online in 2010.

== M&S Bank and M&S Money ==
Credit cards, loans and savings accounts are available from M&S Bank. This was originally an in-house venture trading as 'St Michael Financial Services', later renamed as 'Marks and Spencer Financial Services' and then 'M&S Money'. The banking business was acquired by HSBC in 2004 and uses the Marks and Spencer brand as part of a joint-venture agreement.

The M&S Money brand is now used to promote the broader family of financial services operated on behalf of M&S by a variety of other providers. This includes insurance and travel money provided by third parties, as well as the credit and savings products provided by M&S Bank.

== M&S Energy ==
M&S Energy launched in 2008, in partnership with SSE, to supply domestic gas and electricity. In 2018, Octopus Energy replaced SSE.

== M&S TV and online services ==
Products have been available to order online since the mid-2000s, in response to other chains like Tesco launching their pioneering Tesco.com home shopping delivery service in the early 2000s.

M&S TV is an online TV station to advertise goods.

The online flower service was accused of unfair trading and using Google to piggy-back advertise on online searches aimed at Interflora online in 2010.

== Former clothing ranges and product types ==
=== Old labels ===
'St Margaret', 'St Michael' and 'Homecare' brands were the time-honoured brand labels that fell out of use in the company wide re-branding campaign of the early 2000s. The stylish 1996–1997 'Orient Express Tagged' brand was the first of numerous new brands, most of which were in women's and children's clothes. The 'Orient Express Tagged' brand was revived in 2007 as the year long 'Orient Express Platform 10' brand and was part of the inspiration behind the 'Portfolio' brand. The men's Autograph brand was then launched in 2000 and continues to this day.

'Plus range maternity – larger sizes of maternity clothes were absorbed into the already existing 'Limited Collection Maternity', under the name of 'M&S Maternity' in 2008 to simplify administration.

The women's 'Perfect' and 'Essential' sub-brands were largely relaunched in 2009 as the 'Portfolio' range, but without the high end designer blouses. Perfect still operates in men's rain coats and cookware. Perfect was relaunced in January 2010 as a seasonal sub-brand of Portfolio.

Sir Stuart Rose axed both the ailing casual menswear brand SP Clothing, the View From sportswear range, the David Beckham children's range, DB07 clothes, the teenage range Per Una Due and several food lines in 2004, because he thought the business' stock inventory management had become 'too complicated'

The retailer had launched several brands, sub-brands and line of womenswear and Childrenswear in recent years such as Indigo Collection Junior, Indigo Collection and Portfolio. Indigo Collection aimed at women over 30s, while Portfolio 45s. Overall, M &S has ten womenswear sub-brands and sub-sub-brands, such as Per Una and Autograph, but only six menswear brands, such as Blue Harbour, North Coast and Collezione by 2010.

=== The 2008–9 restructuring plan ===
As part of the 2008-9 restructuring plan, nine sub-brands deemed to be unprofitable, unnecessary or superfluous were either discontinued, merged or relaunched in 2008, with further activity, including some store closures, occurring in both 2009 and 2010.

- 'Conde Nast' (the M&S clothes, not Condé Nast Publications) designer clothes were a planned sub-brand that was not launched over the festive season of 2009–2010 because of the credit crunch and became part of the 'Indigo Collection' and 'Portfolio' lines.
- All the Kid's furniture (the 'Kid's bedroom' line), bedding and electronic toys (part of the 'Toy shop' brand) were re-grouped and expanded as the 'Kids at home' brand in January 2010, but the merger had been repealed and broken back up by July 2010.
- Perfection (Autograph's & Per Una's perfumeries merged into one in early 2009)

M&S also began to sell other branded goods like Kellogg's Corn Flakes from November 2008. and may ditch its own branded food in 2011 due to poor turn over beyond the 'Food to go', 'Lunchtogo' and 'Gastropub' lines.

=== The 2010 product audit ===
Another review and re-branding exercise was planned for late 2010 and 2011 after several years of declining sales in the womenswear department as born out by an audit conducted by the firm the Retail Knowledge Bank in the August 2010.

'PU Active' was a brief foray by Per Una into the casual sportswear lines in the September 2010, but it was scrapped during its infancy by the October due to poor sales figures.

=== The '2011 brand cull' ===
Marc Bolland had considered axing several brands in early 2011 after an audit by the Retail Knowledge Bank in the August 2010, revealed that sales of M&S womenswear were at a ten-year low. The audit covered both the Limited Collection, Autograph, Autograph Weekend, Classic Collection, Per Una, Portfolio and Indigo.

In the summer of 2010, Drapers magazine claimed that Per Una was the only clothing brand that was not at risk of being axed in Mr Bolland's shake-up of the plethora of clothing brands sold at M&S. Per Una was planned to stay due to its successful and distinctive flair, but Portfolio and Indigo were planned go due to poor sales. The Limited Collection, Autograph, Autograph Weekend, Classic Collection brands were being considered for the cull during mid-2010, but were later given a reprieve.

It was revealed in the November 2010, that there would be a major 3 year UK store revamp, which would cost between £850,000,000 and £900,000,000 and a cull of what Mr Bolland called "the often confusing" store layouts and "indistinguishable brands".

M&S also announced it was planning to take over Twiggy's Twiggy international label some during the winter 2010–2011.

=== The May–August 2011 Corporate revamp ===
Fashion guru Sara Bradley was reported in March as planning to take a 'senior role' within M&S's clothing business by mid-2011. The official goal was to be better at food than supermarkets and better at clothes and general merchandise than department stores.

Alison Jones, who is the daughter of Sir David Jones, joined M&S on 2 June, as the new brand director for general merchandise, under the leadership of marketing director Steve Sharp. She had gained previous experience at Topshop and Debenhams. The role has been created to give a more cohesive approach to M&S's branding and help develop and co-ordinate the brand and strategy for M&S's clothing division.

=== May 2013 revamp ===
15 May 2013 saw the launch of the 'Best of British' range as well as the overhaul of Per Una and Indigo. Patrick Bousquet-Chavanne – currently M&S's corporate director of strategy implementation and business development became the new marketing director and will succeed Steven Sharp in July. Mark Bolland also vowed to bring back "quality and style"

== The new 2017 seasonal collections ==
The 'Best of British' range had been discontinued by 2017.

Several new lines had started.

1. Autumn 17 Preview (adverts for the Altum collection)
2. Flattering Sleeves (female)
3. The Holiday Shop (both genders)
4. Occasionwear (both genders)
5. Online Exclusives (online only\both genders)
6. Wedding Outfit Inspiration (female)
7. The White Collection (white clothes for both genders)
8. Wedding Shop (both genders)
9. Altum collection (both genders)

=== The new 2017 seasonal collections ===
'The White Collection' was discontinued by mid 2018.

A new line was started.

1. M&S Collection ('elevated' female everyday essentials)
