= Breast Cancer Campaign =

Cancer research charity

- Founded: 1988
- Type: Charitable organisation
- Location: Clifton Centre, 110 Clifton Street, London EC2A 4HT
- Region served: United Kingdom and Ireland
- Employees: 86
- Volunteers: 460
- Website: http://www.breastcancercampaign.org

Breast Cancer Campaign was a breast cancer research charity based in the United Kingdom. In 2015, Breast Cancer Campaign merged with another charity, Breakthrough Breast Cancer, to form the UK's largest breast cancer research charity - Breast Cancer Now.

== History ==
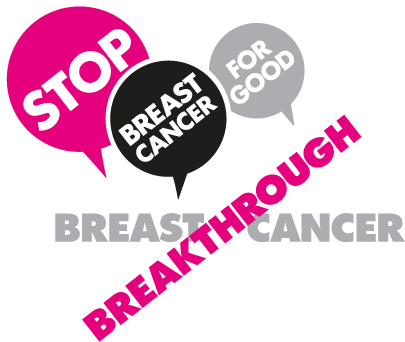
In 2014 it was announced that Breast Cancer Campaign and Breakthrough Breast Cancer (pictured) were to merge.

In 2014 it was announced that Breast Cancer Campaign would be merging with the charity Breakthrough Breast Cancer.

== Breast Cancer Campaign Tissue Bank ==
The Breast Cancer Campaign Tissue Bank was a collaboration between four research centres which aimed to create a bank of breast cancer tissues for researchers to study. The four research centres were:

- The University of Leeds
- Barts Cancer Institute, Queen Mary University of London
- The University of Dundee
- The University of Nottingham

In 2024, Breast Cancer Now has continued this work with centres in London, Aberdeen, Norwich and Sheffield.

== Campaigning activities ==
Breast Cancer Campaign supported the Off-patent Drugs Bill, a Private Members Bill proposed in 2014, which could have increased Government support for off-patent drugs where there was no incentive for pharmaceutical companies to support the creation of life enhancing breast cancer drugs.

== Fundraising activities ==
wear it pink is a UK-wide fundraising initiative organised by Breast Cancer Now. Held annually in October, which is Breast Cancer Awareness Month, supporters wear an item of pink and in return donate some money; supporters can also raise money by other means, e.g., sales and raffles. The money raised funds around 100 projects, specifically breast cancer research throughout the UK and Ireland. This awareness emphasizes the need for improved diagnosis, treatment, prevention and cure.

wear it pink is the UK's original and biggest pink day during October. Set up in 2002 by Campaign to help fundraise for breast cancer research, since its beginning, the fundraising initiative has raised over £23 million for breast cancer research. Anyone can take part and it is popular with office workers, schools and community clubs. The 2011 Wear it Pink event raised £2.2 million for cancer research. By early 2024, the event had raised £41million. As said by a Bolton West MP, "I know people who have lost friends and family members to the disease and I would like to encourage local residents to support Wear it Pink to raise valuable funds for breast cancer research".

== See also ==
- Cancer Drugs Fund
