= Breast Cancer Now =

Charity in the UK

- Formation: 2015; 11 years ago
- Merger of: Breast Cancer Campaign; Breakthrough Breast Cancer; Breast Cancer Care
- Registration no.: 1160558 (England and Wales); SC045584 (Scotland)
- Purpose: Breast cancer awareness, research and support
- Headquarters: Aldgate, London, England
- Location: United Kingdom
- Chief Executive: Claire Rowney
- Royal Patron: King Charles III
- Revenue: £45 million GBP (2019)
- Website: http://breastcancernow.org/

Breast Cancer Now is a charity in the United Kingdom which was formed by the merger of Breast Cancer Campaign, Breakthrough Breast Cancer and Breast Cancer Care. It is the United Kingdom's largest breast cancer charity. Its declared "Action Plan" is "by 2050, everyone who develops breast cancer will live".

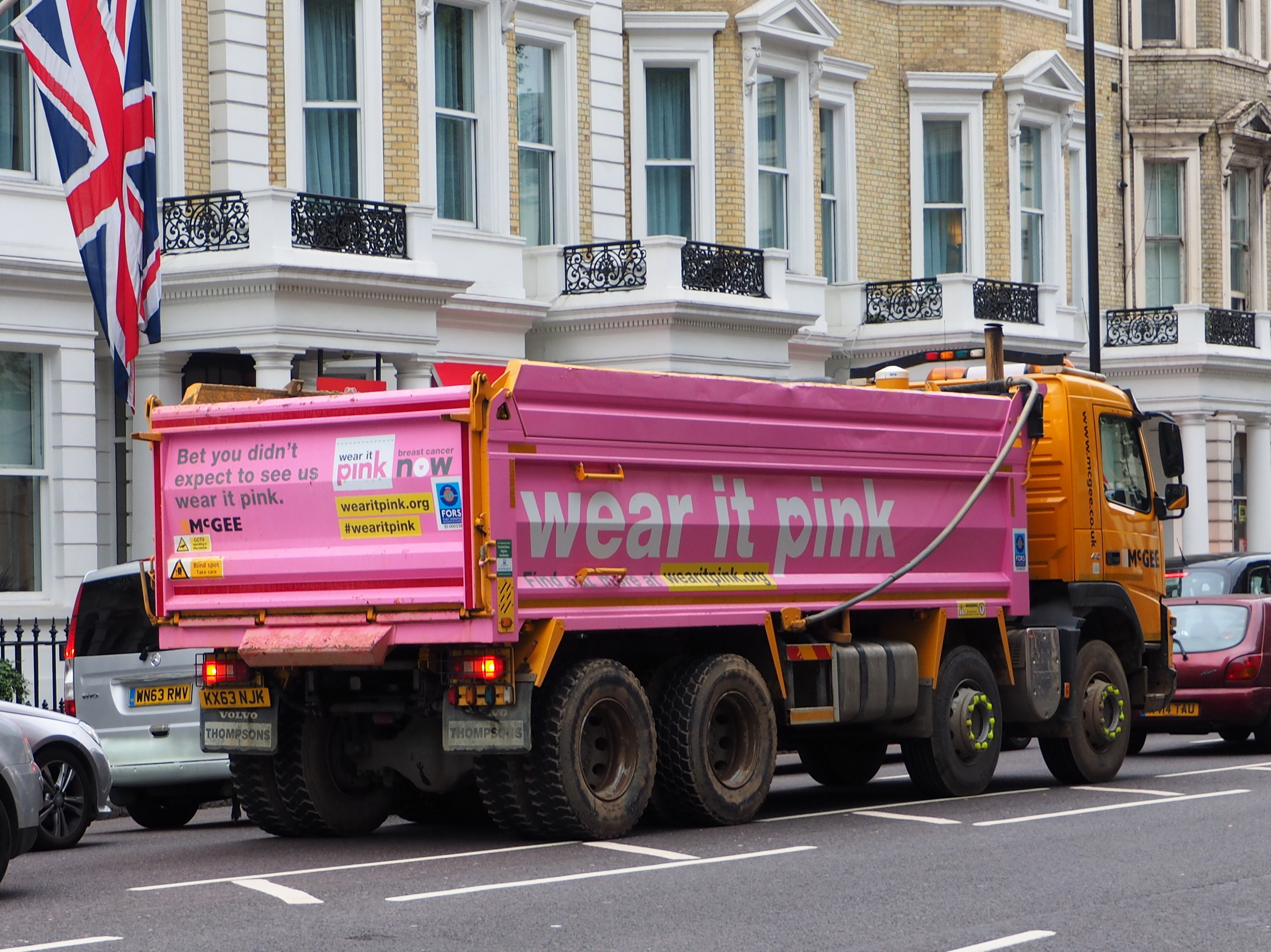
A truck owned by the McGee engineering company advertising Breast Cancer Now's 'wear it pink' campaign in 2015

Among other projects the charity provides most of the funding for the Breast Cancer Now Toby Robins Research Centre at the Institute of Cancer Research, London, which employs 120 scientists and clinicians.

The charity's chief executive is Claire Rowney, and King Charles III is its royal patron.

In November 2018 research-focused Breast Cancer Now and support-focused Breast Cancer Care announced that they would merge on 1 April 2019, creating a charity with an income of about £45 million. The merged charity is chaired by Jill Thompson, formerly a trustee of Breast Cancer Care, and the chief executive is Delyth Morgan, formerly chief executive of Breast Cancer Now. The combined headquarters are at Breast Cancer Now offices at Aldgate, London. The charity said that it would operate using both names for about a year, when a new logo and name was expected to be introduced. As of January 2020 the charity's formal name is "Breast Cancer Care and Breast Cancer Now" and it uses the working name "Breast Cancer Now".

Breast Cancer Now's flagship fundraising event is their 'wear it pink' campaign. This is one of the UK's biggest fundraising events having raised over £33 million since it launched in 2002. In 2019, the date for the 'wear it pink' campaign was 18 October.

== See also ==
- Cancer in the United Kingdom
