= Breakthrough Breast Cancer =

UK charity (1999–2015)

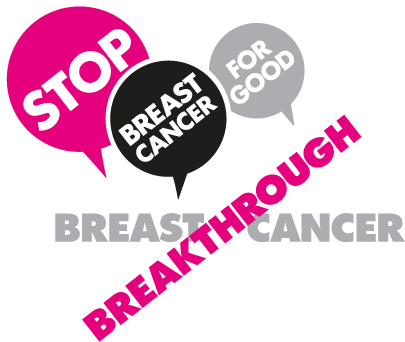
Breakthrough Breast Cancer logo

Breakthrough Breast Cancer was a United Kingdom charity whose mission was to "save lives through improving early diagnosis, developing new treatments and preventing all types of breast cancer". In 2015, Breakthrough Breast Cancer merged with another UK charity, Breast Cancer Campaign, to form the UK's largest breast cancer research charity - Breast Cancer Now. In 2019, Breast Cancer Care merged with Breast Cancer Now and the two organizations together became known as Breast Cancer Now.

== History ==
Breakthrough Breast Cancer was envisioned by Bill Freedman and his children. Freedman's wife, actress Toby Robins (1931–1986), died from breast cancer in 1986. With Barry Gusterson of the Institute of Cancer Research, Freedman concluded that a new approach was needed to tackle that disease. They set out to establish a centre of excellence for breast cancer research under one roof, working on a coordinated programme of research. The organisation was founded to make this a reality, and in 1999 the Breakthrough Toby Robins Breast Cancer Research Centre, at the Institute of Cancer Research, opened.

In addition to the research centre, Breakthrough provides expert information about breast cancer and campaigns for better breast cancer services. In November 2003, their "Campaigns & Advocacy Network" was formed when they merged with the UK Breast Cancer Coalition (UKBCC). The organization works in partnership with other cancer research organisations and is a member of the National Cancer Research Institute.

== Survey ==
The "Breakthrough Generations Survey" aims to survey 100,000 women and "plans to be the largest, most comprehensive scientific study into the causes of breast cancer". The survey is being carried out in association with the Institute of Cancer Research. It asks women taking part to complete a comprehensive questionnaire about a wide range of health and lifestyle topics, and to have a blood sample taken, to then be followed up by investigators over the next 50 years.

== Fundraising campaigns ==
The charity ran fundraising campaigns throughout the year, including Fashion Targets Breast Cancer, £1,000 Challenge, Pink Bake Off, running events, treks and others.

Marks & Spencer has sold a wide range of charitable women's clothes for them. for many years, and Avon have supported the charity for over 20 years with a range of fundraising products and campaigns.

== TLC ==
Breakthrough Breast Cancer's TLC (Touch, Look, Check) breast cancer awareness campaign encourages women to be aware of the signs and symptoms of breast cancer.

== iBreastCheck ==
Breakthrough Breast Cancer launched 'iBreastCheck' as part of Breast Cancer Awareness Month in 2010. iBreastCheck is a mobile app that is an extension of the TLC campaign (see above), incorporating a TLC video, slideshow and reminder service, personalised breast cancer risk report, and information on Breakthrough's activities and how to get involved. Initially available for iPhones, an Android version was released in 2012.

== NHS Breast Screening: The Facts ==
In 2013 Breakthrough Breast Cancer launched a 'NHS Breast Screening: The Facts' website to support women aged 50–70 in making an informed choice about whether to attend breast screening, after controversy in the UK media regarding the efficacy of breast screening for women. The website was the winner of the 2014 AMRC (Association of Medical Research Charities) Science Communication Awards for 'Communicating controversial topics'.

== See also ==
- List of Marks & Spencer brands
